= Be All My Sins Remember'd =

- Stargate Atlantis episode
- Towards the end of the battle, every Replicator cell is pulled from the Asuran ships down to the planet
- Episode no.: Season 4 Episode 11
- Directed by: Andy Mikita
- Written by: Martin Gero
- Production code: 411
- Original air date: January 4, 2008

Guest appearances
- Torri Higginson as Elizabeth Weir; Mitch Pileggi as Steven Caldwell; David Nykl as Radek Zelenka; Christopher Heyerdahl as "Todd"; Brendan Penny as "Todd"; Michael Beach as Abe Ellis; Martin Christopher as Major Marks; Chuck Campbell as Chuck; Michelle Morgan as FRAN; Jill Wagner as Larrin; Niall Matter as Lt. Kemp

Episode chronology
← Previous "This Mortal Coil"	Next → "Spoils of War"
- Stargate Atlantis (season 4)

"Be All My Sins Remember'd" is the 71st episode of the science fiction television series Stargate Atlantis, and the eleventh episode of the series' fourth season. The episode was written by Atlantis co-executive producer, Martin Gero, his third script of the season, and directed by Andy Mikita. The episode originally aired on the Sci Fi Channel in the United States on January 4, 2008, and aired on Sky One in the United Kingdom on January 8. The episode's title is derived from the line, "The fair Ophelia! Nymph, in thy orisons/ Be all my sins remember'd" from the "Get thee to a nunnery" scene in William Shakespeare's Hamlet.

The episode is the second installment of a three-episode arc that began with the mid-season finale "This Mortal Coil" (also taken from Hamlet's soliloquy), in which nanite-created copies of Lieutenant Colonel John Sheppard and his team give their real counterparts on Atlantis a device that reveals the presence of over thirty Asuran battleships in the Pegasus galaxy. The episode resolves the main Asuran storyline with their permanent defeat at the hands of the Atlantis Expedition. The episode received generally positive critical reviews.

== Plot ==
The Earth ships Apollo and Daedalus, which have been upgraded with Asgard plasma beam weapons, arrive in the Pegasus galaxy to battle the Asurans. After some initial successes against their enemy, they learn that the Asurans have retreated back to the safety of their homeworld to rebuild their numbers. Rodney McKay (David Hewlett) works with Todd, a Wraith prisoner (Brendan Penny, Christopher Heyerdahl) to create a computer virus to deactivate the Asurans, but they do not succeed. However, McKay develops an alternate plan to enhance the attractive forces between the Asuran nanites, pulling them together into a superdense mass that the Expedition can then implode by overloading ZPMs around it. To carry out this plan, he creates another humanoid Replicator to serve as a nucleus, later dubbed "FRAN" ("Friendly Replicator Android", played by Michelle Morgan).

For the plan to be successful, the Expedition must also prevent the Asuran ships from escaping into hyperspace. The Wraith prisoner convinces seven Wraith hive ships to join the Earth ships' attack. Concerned about the Asuran threat, the Travelers under Larrin contribute some of their ships as well. Back on Atlantis, Teyla (Rachel Luttrell) is forced to admit that she is pregnant, and is pulled off duty. The combined fleet arrives over the Asuran homeworld and engages the enemy fleet, while Fran beams down to the surface and begins to pull the other nanites towards her. However, the nanite mass collapses the power grid, meaning that the ZPMs cannot be overloaded. McKay and Colonel Carter (Amanda Tapping) determine that, if they increase the mass's attraction to the ultra-dense neutronium in the planet's crust, the additional mass will cause it to sink into the core of the planet. The pressure and heat in the core initiates a fusion reaction so that the planet explodes, shortly after the allied fleet escapes. One Asuran ship survives at the end of the episode, revealing its commander as Elizabeth Weir (Torri Higginson), who notes that their "work" can now begin without interference.

== Production ==
Writer Martin Gero completed the script of "Be All My Sins Remember'd" by May 7, 2007. The script included a conversation between Carter and Colonel Caldwell (Mitch Pileggi), where he talks to her as an "equal", but the filmed scene was cut when the episode was longer than anticipated. The production crew felt the scene was not important enough, but Gero also noticed with surprise that Mitch Pileggi acted it out as if it were a "romance scene".

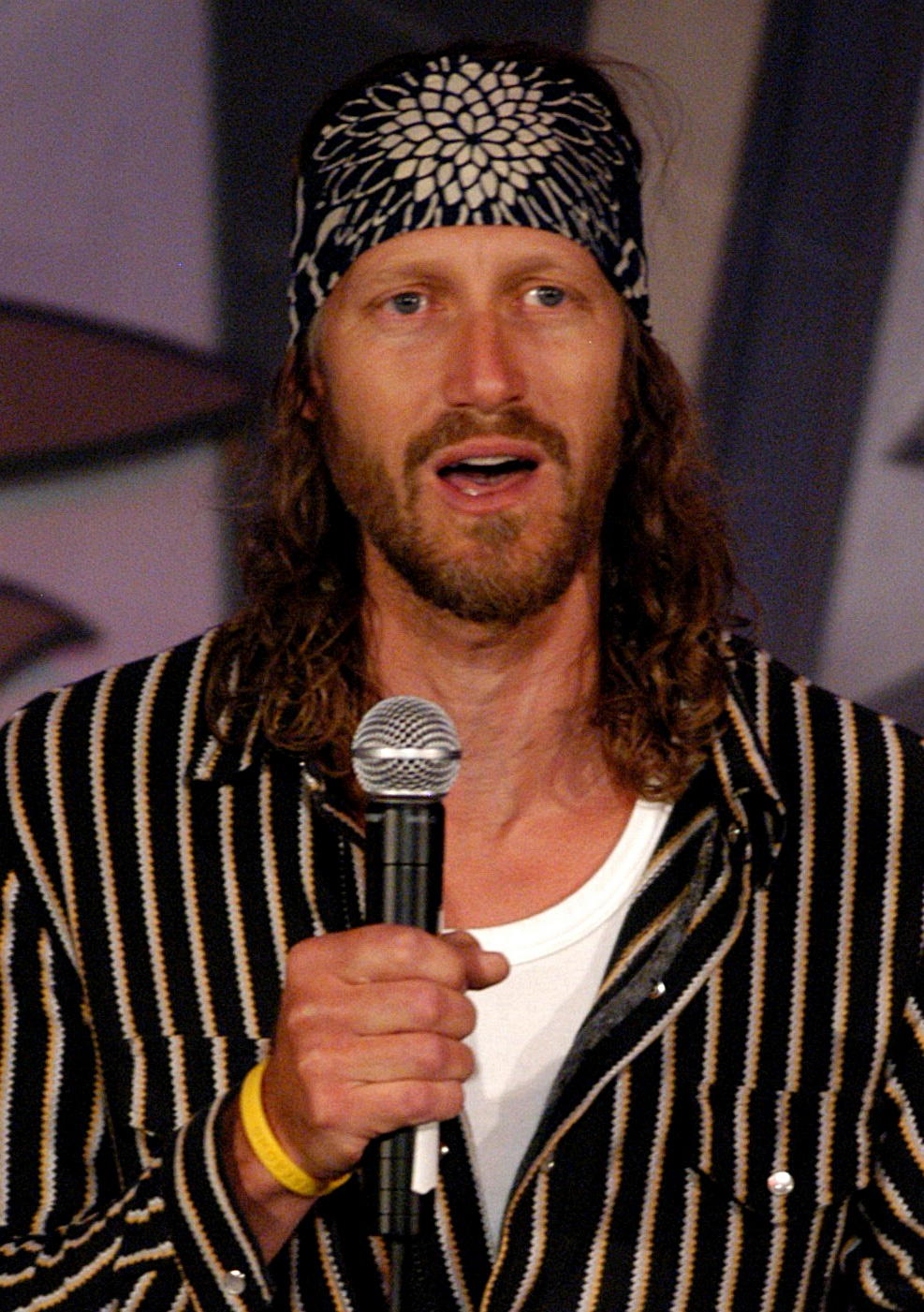
Christopher Heyerdahl provided the voice of "Todd", but was unavailable to play the character at the time of filming.

Mitch Pileggi returned as Colonel Caldwell, who has not appeared in the series since season three's twelfth episode, "Echoes", due to Pileggi's commitments in The Batman animated series. He also appeared alongside Michael Beach, who last played Colonel Abe Ellis in "Lifeline". Christopher Heyerdahl returned as the Wraith character who would be named "Todd" in the next episode. However, Heyerdahl was unavailable to appear for "Be All My Sins Remember'd", so Brendan Penny filled in for the part. Penny was made to look like Heyerdahl as convincingly as possible, but Heyerdahl was asked to provide the voice for the character since the producers feared that the audience would later pick up on Penny's voice otherwise.

Michelle Morgan played "FRAN", the "Friendly Replicator Android". Morgan was originally set to play Linara, Davos' daughter from a previous episode, "The Seer". However, the role was given to Kimberley Warnat when Morgan had to participate in a reshoot of her role in Diary of the Dead. Morgan was disappointed that she did not get the role of Linara, but stated after her casting as FRAN that it was fun to play a character that is highly dangerous and yet completely innocent. Jill Wagner returned as Larrin for this episode, after her debut appearance in "Travelers". Torri Higginson returned as Elizabeth Weir in her fourth appearance in the season, at the very end of the episode. The script intended her to have two lines of dialog in the episode, but producers knew that the audience would recognize Higginson's voice and hence used a stand-in to say the first line instead.

The visual effects were done by the Vancouver-based Image Engine. Before the broadcasting, Atlantis visual effects supervisor Mark Savela revealed that the episode would have the "biggest effects sequence viewers will ever have seen," which involved the epic space battle in the climax of the episode. Savela intended the visual effects to top the minute-long sequence of the Horizon missiles firing to the Asuran homeworld in the season three finale "First Strike". The sequence was reportedly so complicated that for the first time in the series, models were used to physically map out the action before creating the initial animatics. Gero later stated that the episode had a battle sequence that "we will not be able to top. It is the greatest special effects sequence that the show has ever done." The episode used an extent of special effects and had one of the highest budgets in the entire series, comparable with the series' pilot episode "Rising".

== Reception ==
When "Be All My Sins Remember'd" aired on the Sci Fi Channel on January 4, 2008, the episode received a total household ratings of 1.4, a ratings record for the series' fourth season, and the highest in the series since the 1.5 rating of the season three finale, "First Strike". "Be All My Sins Remember'd" made Stargate Atlantis SCI FI's highest rated original series of the week, and the second most viewed broadcasting in total, second to the Television movie "Beyond Loch Ness", which starred Stargate veterans Don S. Davis and Paul McGillion and had a rating of 1.7. In its UK airing on Sky One on January 8, 2008, the episode was watched by approximately 485,000 viewers, making the series the most-watched series of the week, even beating The Simpsons.

IGN's Tory Ireland Mell gave the episode an "incredible" rating of 9.6 out of 10, praising the return of Larrin and the introduction of "FRAN". He described the space battle against the Replicators as "legendary", but did not feel that the visual effects were as good as Battlestar Galactica. GateWorld rated the episode with four stars (out of a possible four), only one of two episodes in the season to do so. "Be All My Sins Remember'd" achieved 9.52 out of 10 from the GateWorld fan rating, making it one of only seven episodes in the Stargate franchise to have a fan rating higher than 9.5 at the time. The space battle earned the visual effects team a nomination for "Best Visual Effects" in the 23rd Annual Gemini Awards, but they lost to The Tudors. Four days after the episode's first broadcast, Stargate Atlantis won a People's Choice Award for "Best Sci-Fi Show", beating Battlestar Galactica and Doctor Who.
