= Adrift (Stargate Atlantis) =

- Stargate Atlantis episode
- Episode no.: Season 4 Episode 1
- Directed by: Martin Wood
- Written by: Martin Gero
- Production code: 402
- Original air date: 28 September 2007

Guest appearances
- Torri Higginson as Elizabeth Weir; Jewel Staite as Jennifer Keller; David Nykl as Radek Zelenka; Michael Beach as Abe Ellis; Bill Dow as Bill Lee; Chuck Campbell as Chuck; Linda Ko as Marie; Gerry Durand as Captain Levine

Episode chronology
← Previous "First Strike"	Next → "Lifeline"
- Stargate Atlantis (season 4)

"Adrift" is the 61st episode and the fourth season premiere of the science fiction television series Stargate Atlantis. The episode first aired in the United States on September 28, 2007, on the Sci Fi Channel, and subsequently aired October 9 on Sky One in the United Kingdom. It was written by executive producer Martin Gero, and directed by Martin Wood. The episode continues from the third-season finale "First Strike", where Atlantis drops out of hyperspace in the middle of deep space with 24 hours of power left after an Asuran attack.

"Adrift" was a visual effects milestone for the series. It introduced several cast changes for the season, including the departure of Carson Beckett (Paul McGillion) and Elizabeth Weir (Torri Higginson), and the addition of Samantha Carter (Amanda Tapping) to the main cast. Before its release, an incomplete version of the episode was leaked on the Internet. After its release, "Adrift" started the season with a drop in ratings since the last season finale. The episode earned the series Emmy and Visual Effects Society Award nominations, and was generally well received.

== Plot ==
With Weir (Torri Higginson) incapacitated, Sheppard (Joe Flanigan) is forced to take command of Atlantis. McKay (David Hewlett) determines that the power conduits are damaged, preventing Atlantis from completing its jump to the planet M12-578. While teams are sent to patch them up, the shield starts to collapse, resulting in the deaths of one team. McKay later decides to collapse the shield to cover the central tower in order to conserve power, and give Zelenka (David Nykl) time to patch up the conduits. However, the city approaches an asteroid belt, and the only way to go through without using up the power is for Sheppard to lead a fleet of Puddle Jumpers and clear a path. Although inexperienced, the pilots succeed, but impacts from the stragglers damage the stardrive control crystals, and they have to fix it before jumping again.

In the midway station, Colonel Carter (Amanda Tapping) and Bill Lee (Bill Dow) are contacted by the Apollo, informing them Atlantis did not arrive. Carter and Lee eventually decide to find the city by using the Apollo to perform small jumps along the city's path and augment their sensors to increase the chance of finding Atlantis. Dr. Keller (Jewel Staite) exhausts her medical expertise to save Weir, and asks McKay to reprogramme the nanites Weir was infected with in "The Real World". Against Sheppard's orders, McKay goes ahead with it.

In space suits, Sheppard and Zelenka reach the controls and repair them, but in the process Zelenka is injured by a micro-asteroid. By then, Atlantis has lost too much power to jump again. Furthermore, Sheppard learns McKay has disobeyed his order and angrily tells him to deactivate the nanites. Weir, having apparently fully recovered, regains consciousness. When she learns the nanites are keeping her alive, she warns Teyla (Rachel Luttrell) that saving her this way is a bad idea. McKay apologises to Sheppard, and they continue working. In the end, McKay decides to use an experimental Jumper with a hyperdrive he worked on since "Tao of Rodney" and use it to steal a Zero Point Module from the Asuran homeworld.

== Production ==
"Adrift" first surfaced in February 2007, before the airing of "First Strike". By March it was confirmed to be the first of a two-part opening for the fourth season along with "Lifeline" and would be similar in style to "Progeny" and "The Real World". The producers kept trying to find new ways to "out-do" the efforts of the previous seasons, which they described was "different" to them, since they introduced more of a balance between team-based and character-based episodes. After the completion of "First Strike", the producers thought it was the biggest episode they had ever done, and wondered how the fourth season would top that. During the writing stages, Martin Gero wanted the episode to "tee up" with the last episode of the season, and hence wanted the episode to become part of a story-arc for the entire season. Gero also wanted the episode to have "no down time" for the characters like the previous season premieres. After Zelenka gets injured, a scene where a Puddle Jumper was originally meant to pick them both up. However, having a Jumper set nearby in an Atlantis set would not be practical enough, and was cut. He also wrote to have Sheppard in an uneased state while forced to take command of Atlantis. The scene where McKay and Zelenka converse and finish each other's sentences were parallel to the arguing between Gero and Wood while working together on set. He considered the scene between Teyla and Weir to be the cliffhanger, but was changed to the following scene, as Gero felt that would be the better cliffhanger, similar to the one for "The Return, Part 1".

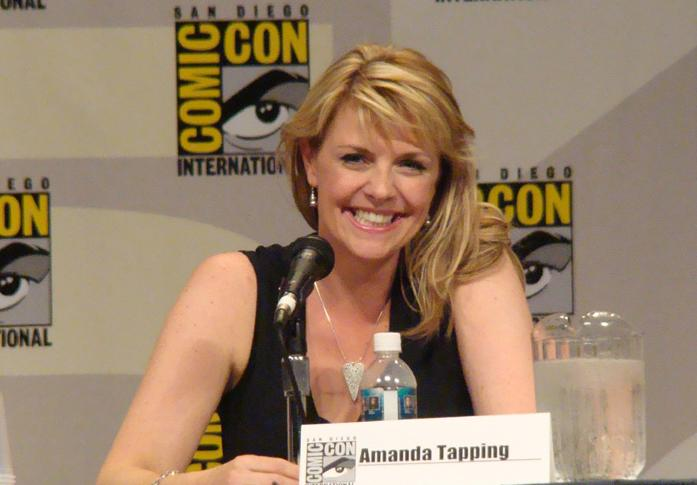
Amanda Tapping joins the main cast for season four.

The episode, and the season itself has introduced Amanda Tapping as Samantha Carter for her first of 14 episode appearance, after finishing her appearances on all ten seasons of the sister series, Stargate SG-1. Carter would replace Elizabeth Weir as the leader of the Atlantis Expedition after the episode. However, Carter would only have a supporting role as opposed to a lead role on SG-1. The episode would also give the audience "an opportunity to really get to know Dr. Jennifer Keller" (Staite). Gero was reluctant to accept an updated opening title sequence, which mentioned the departure of Weir and the introduction of Carter, which would give the casual viewers a tip.

While filming the scene where Keller and her team perform a Decompressive craniectomy on Weir, an actual brain surgeon performed the same procedure on a head model live from ten feet away, and directed the cast on what to do. While following the surgeon, Staite was nervous about doing the scene. After filming was completed, the surgeon's voice was removed from the final cut. During the sequence where the city travels through a clearing in the asteroid field, the producers wanted the scene where Atlantis gets hit by the odd asteroid as authentic as possible, so in the control room, not only the cameras, but the screens and tables on the set were shaken slightly as well.

The episode was one of the most expensive in the series at the time, with two visual effects milestones for the series. During one of the sequences, the visual effects team switched from stock explosions on 2D to 3D versions. The producers wished to exceed the minute-long Horizon sequence in the previous episode. The scene where the doors close while the shield is collapsing was merely stock footage from "Hot Zone", with the CGI of the shield added on. When the producers conceived the idea for the space jump between Sheppard and Zelenka, they thought it would be "cool", as well as thinking that they were possibly too apprehensive. However, the sequence was pulled off, and Paul Mullie described the jump as "one of the best visual effects we have ever done." The scene were one team dies from the collapsing shield however, was not performed as well as the producers hoped.

== Reception ==
Before the episode originally aired, a near-complete version was leaked onto the Internet. After it aired in the United States, "Adrift" earned a 1.2 household Nielsen rating, representing 1.7 million viewers; 896,000 from ages 18 to 49, and 962,000 from the 25 to 54 demographic. The episode decreased viewership by six percent from the average ratings from the back half of the third season, and dropped from a 1.5 household rating from the third-season premiere, "No Man's Land". The reasoning may be the fact that several well-known series aired on the same time slot. However, according to the Live + 3 Day rating, the ratings boosted to 1.4. In the United Kingdom, "Adrift" received 527,000 viewers, placing Atlantis number six in the top ten broadcasts for Sky One for that week.

Tory Ireland Mell of IGN thought the season premiere performed well without Stargate SG-1, and liked the episode's visual effects sequences and action, but was critical about the lack of Ronon's presence after his injury in the last episode, giving "Adrift" a "descent" rating of 7.0 out of 10. Critical Myth rated the episode 8 out of 10, praising the direction the writers took with the episode, Sheppard being rather forced into command of the city with the incapacitation of Weir, as well as comparing the characters' "chance to prove their mettle through extreme adversity" to "The Siege, Part 2". Joe Flanigan (who plays John Sheppard) described this and the following episode as "fun to do," and praised the idea of Atlantis being marooned in space, and wished the arc would last "seven or eight" episodes. "Adrift" was nominated for two awards. In 2008, the visual effects team submitted "Adrift" for a "Primetime Emmy Award for Outstanding Special Visual Effects", but lost to Battlestar Galactica's "He That Believeth in Me". The episode was also nominated for the sixth annual Visual Effects Society Award for "Outstanding Visual Effects in a Broadcast Series", but lost to Fight for Life.
