= List of Stargate Atlantis characters =

Season 4 cast from left to right: Dr. Rodney McKay, Col. Samantha Carter, Lt. Col. John Sheppard, Teyla Emmagan, and Ronon Dex.

The characters from the Canadian-American military science fiction television series Stargate Atlantis were created by Brad Wright and Robert C. Cooper. The series follows the adventures of a human expedition to the lost city of Atlantis in the Pegasus Galaxy. The Stargate has brought humanity into contact with other cultures, including new and powerful enemies: the Wraith, the Genii, and later the Asurans and a lost tribe of Asgard, all while trying to uncover the secrets the Ancients left behind.

Stargate Atlantis has a small cast, amounting to ten main cast actors over its five-season run. Most characters are introduced in outgoing expeditions outside the city of Atlantis.

== Main characters ==
Character	Portrayed by	Seasons				
Character	Portrayed by	1	2	3	4	5
John Sheppard	Joe Flanigan	Main	Main	Main	Main	Main
Elizabeth Weir	Torri Higginson	Main	Main	Main	Recurring	Guest (Note: Played by Michelle Morgan, in "Ghost in the Machine".)
Teyla Emmagan	Rachel Luttrell	Main	Main	Main	Main	Main
Aiden Ford	Rainbow Sun Francks	Main (Note: Only credited as a regular in the first 3 episodes.)	Main			Guest
Rodney McKay	David Hewlett	Main	Main	Main	Main	Main
Ronon Dex	Jason Momoa		Main (Note: Appears as a guest in "Runner" of Season 2, before being promoted to a regular immediately after.)	Main	Main	Main
Carson Beckett	Paul McGillion	Recurring	Main (Note: Credited as a guest in the first 3 episodes of Season 2, before being promoted to a regular thereafter.)	Main	Guest	Recurring
Samantha Carter	Amanda Tapping	Guest	Guest	Guest	Main	Guest
Jennifer Keller	Jewel Staite			Guest	Recurring	Main
Richard Woolsey	Robert Picardo			Recurring	Guest	Main

=== John Sheppard ===
John Sheppard played by Joe Flanigan is a USAF Lieutenant Colonel (ranked major in season 1). He is an experienced and a talented US Air Force Officer in Afghanistan, though his reputation is somewhat tarnished when he disobeyed a direct order in an unsuccessful attempt to save the lives of several US servicemen. When called upon to transport Brigadier General Jack O'Neill into the research base that has been established at the nearby Ancient defense facility, Sheppard inadvertently discovers that he not only has the ATA gene (the genetic factor necessary to activate Ancient technology), but that he is naturally proficient at using it. After some doubts, he finally joins the expedition to Atlantis, although Colonel Marshall Sumner makes it clear he is not pleased about Sheppard's involvement in the mission. In Season 1, Sheppard serves as both a Major and later also becomes the military commander following Colonel Sumner's death. In Season 2, Sheppard is eventually promoted to Lieutenant Colonel and still remains as Atlantis's military commander with Sheppard serving as the team leader for the Atlantis Expedition's team, the First Atlantis Reconnaissance Team or AR-1.

=== Elizabeth Weir ===
Dr. Elizabeth Weir played by Torri Higginson is the civilian and also the original leader of the Atlantis Expedition which she does for the first three years. Prior to joining the SGC, Weir was engaged to be married to a man named Simon Wallace but their engagement ended when Wallace refused to join the SGC. Weir originally served as the head of the SGC after General George Hammond was reassigned in the Stargate SG-1 Season 7 finale episode, "Lost City Part 1" with Weir serving in the role as SGC Commander up until her departure in the Stargate SG-1 Season 8 episode, "New Order Part 2" with Weir being replaced by newly promoted Brigadier General Jack O'Neill. After leaving the SGC, Weir heads to Antarctica to lead the research envoy studying the Ancient defense facility that had been discovered in Antarctica, the Ancient city of Atlantis which SG-1 had uncovered during "Lost City Part 2". Weir eventually leads the Atlantis Expedition which is sent through the Stargate to explore the Lost City of Atlantis. Weir is a diplomat and a leader, often making decisions in the hope they will benefit her and her people although she has clashed with others on occasions. In the Atlantis Season 3 finale episode, "First Strike", Weir is left in a coma when a beam that the Expeditions's enemies, the Asurans had created targets the Control Room of Atlantis. Weir survives although she becomes part-Replicator due to the fact that the nanites that were left in her system during the Stargate Atlantis Season 3 episode, "Progeny" have been reactivated. Weir eventually sacrifices herself to give Sheppard and his team enough time to escape during the Stargate Atlantis Season 4 episode, "Lifeline" with her fate being unknown although she later returns as a Replicator in the Season 5 episode, "Ghost in the Machine". Her position as leader of the Atlantis Expedition is later taken over by Lieutenant Colonel Samantha Carter and following Carter's return to Earth by Richard Woolsey.

=== Samantha Carter ===
Samantha "Sam" Carter played by Amanda Tapping is an astrophysicist and USAF colonel. Samantha Carter is a member of the SGC's flagship team, SG-1, having served there for ten years, with Carter herself having been under the rank of captain, major and then lieutenant colonel and later, at an unknown point after the end of the Ori conflict in Stargate SG-1, Carter is promoted to a "full bird" colonel and is transferred to the Midway space station to oversee the final stages of completion. The IOA appoints Carter as the new commander of the Atlantis expedition early in Season 4 of Atlantis. At the end of the first episode of season five, Carter is recalled to Earth for a Tok'ra extraction ceremony concerning the final Ba'al clone, with Richard Woolsey eventually replacing her as the new commander of the Atlantis Expedition.

=== Richard Woolsey ===
Richard Woolsey played by Robert Picardo is a former member of the NID and the United States representative to the IOA. Richard Woolsey is part of an IOA panel that recalled Dr. Weir to Earth to explain her failed alliance with the Wraith. He genuinely respects Weir and attempts to defend her actions, but must defer to his IOA colleagues. The IOA dispatch him to Atlantis to evaluate Weir's ability to command. While evaluating Weir's abilities, he made a rather poor impression on the expedition members. However, he ultimately sides with Weir by sending the IOA a report modified to favor Weir and keep her in command of Atlantis. Woolsey later joins the Atlantis expedition on a permanent basis at the start of Season Five after his predecessor, Colonel Carter is reassigned.

=== Rodney McKay ===
Rodney McKay or Meredith Rodney McKay played by David Hewlett is the Chief Science Officer of the Atlantis expedition and a member of the main Expedition team, the First Atlantis Reconnaissance Team or AR-1. Dr. McKay is one of the most arrogant and condescending personalities in the Stargate franchise. He once identified himself as a Mensa member and believes himself to be the smartest person in the city, as mentioned in a conversation between Dr. Weir and Carson in "Hide and Seek". What makes it worse for his fellow team members is that, while he does not possess the wisdom of many of the other characters, in terms of raw intelligence or at least the occasional fits of insight/brilliance, he is. Despite his irritating demeanor, many members of the Atlantis expedition are on friendly terms with him, and McKay is able to keep steady relationships and is close to the people he works with, having referred to them as a surrogate family in a message to his estranged sister Jeannie Miller (played by David Hewlett's real-life younger sister, actress Kate Hewlett).

=== Ronon Dex ===
Ronon Dex played by Jason Momoa is a Satedan warrior and a member of the Satedan military where he held the rank of Specialist. Approximately seven years before Ronon's first contact with the Atlantis Expedition, the Wraith attacked Sateda. Ronon remained behind with Melena to fight the Wraith, but the Wraith defeated Satedan forces and Melena was killed before Ronon's eyes in an explosion. Ronon was later captured by the Wraith who instead of feeding on him turned him into a Runner, implanting a tracking device in his upper back and setting him loose to be constantly hunted. Ronon later becomes a permanent member of Sheppard's team, AR-1, replacing Aidan Ford who defects from Atlantis after Ford develops an addiction to the Wraith enzyme.

=== Teyla Emmagan ===
Teyla Emmagan played by Rachel Luttrell is the leader of the Athosians, a human race of farmers, hunters, and traders from the planet Athos in the Pegasus Galaxy. After a Wraith attack on Athos, Teyla and the Athosians settle in Atlantis. Friction in "Suspicion" causes the Athosians to leave Atlantis and settle on the mainland. Teyla stays with Sheppard's team, but later helps with evacuating the Athosians from the mainland several times in the face of various threats. In season 1's "The Gift", Teyla and the Atlantis expedition learn that her ancestors were experimented on by a Wraith scientist, and that Teyla is one of the few Athosians who possess trace amounts of Wraith DNA which enable her to sense the Wraith through their telepathic network. Teyla is also a member of the Expedition's flagship team, AR-1 and is also adept at hand-to-hand combat.

=== Carson Beckett ===
Carson Beckett played by Paul McGillion is the original Chief Medical Officer of the Atlantis expedition. Beckett was born with the Ancient Technology Activation (ATA) gene, which gives the carrier the ability to access Ancient technology. At the beginning of Stargate Atlantis, Beckett is a doctor with an extended knowledge of medicine and just discovered the Ancient gene. Elizabeth Weir selects him for the Atlantis Expedition and stationed him at the Ancient outpost in Antarctica, where the SG-1 team had defeated the nemesis Anubis in the Stargate SG-1 season seven finale, "Lost City". In "Hide and Seek", he creates a gene therapy that emulates the ATA gene in normal humans with a 48 percent success rate. Later, during Beckett's capture on the planet M8G-352 in season 3's "Misbegotten", Michael took some of Beckett's DNA to make a clone. In the Season 3 episode, Sunday, Beckett is killed by an exploding tumor but his clone later returns to join the Atlantis team.

=== Aiden Ford ===
Aiden Ford played by Rainbow Sun Francks is a USMC Lieutenant. Ford served in the Stargate Command (SGC) before and is twenty-five years old at the beginning of the first season. The only family that Ford mentions are his grandparents. Ford served as John Sheppard's second-in-command after the events of "Rising" until a Wraith feeds upon Ford during a Wraith attack on Atlantis in season 2's "The Siege, Part 3". An exploding grenade blows them off a building into the ocean, and Ford's unconscious body and the still attached Wraith are recovered nearly an hour later. Ford is diagnosed to have survived an overdose of addictive Wraith enzyme and as a result begins undergoing mental and physical changes, one of which involves his left eye turning completely black. He eventually leaves Atlantis for good, embarking on a quest to get more enzyme for himself. He later returns halfway through Season 2 where he captures Sheppard's team and recruits them into helping him destroy a Hive Ship. The mission gets off to a bad start with many of Ford's men dying or being captured. The Hive Ship Ford was on is soon destroyed and it is presumed that Ford is dead.

=== Jennifer Keller ===
Jennifer Keller, played by Jewel Staite, is the Chief Medical Officer of the Atlantis expedition, replacing her predecessor, Dr. Carson Beckett (although Keller accepts the role with some reluctance). Graduating high school at the age of 15, Keller was three years ahead of her peers, and earned a bachelor's degree before her 18th birthday. Upon becoming Atlantis' Chief Medical Officer, Keller faces a baptism of fire as she fights to save Dr. Elizabeth Weir who has been badly injured by an Asuran beam weapon. Keller later informs Rodney McKay and that Weir can be saved by using the now-inactive Replicator nanites in her bloodstream. Towards the end of the fifth season, she starts a romantic relationship with McKay; the status of their relationship at the end of the series is never revealed.

== Recurring Earth characters ==
=== Recurring military characters ===
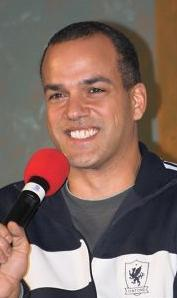
- Dean Marshall played Bates
  Sergeant Bates, played by Dean Marshall (seasons 1, 4) – A career military man who serves as the head of security on Atlantis in season 1. He first appears in "Rising" as a Marine under Colonel Sumner's command, and participates in their mission to Athos. In "Suspicion", he voices his belief that one of the Athosians is collaborating with the Wraith, putting him at odds with Major Sheppard and Teyla. His conflict with Teyla heightens in "The Gift". After Teyla discovers she has Wraith DNA, he believes her to be a security risk as the Wraith could exploit their telepathic connection to her to obtain information. In "The Siege", he all but accuses Teyla of working with the Wraith, and the two almost come to blows. Shortly after Bates is found severely beaten, found to be the work of a Wraith who had infiltrated the city. Due to his injuries, Dr. Carson Beckett places Bates in a medically induced coma. Bates is shown to have returned to Earth and honorably discharged from the military in the season 4 episode "Outcast". He began working for IOA field operations, and assists Sheppard and Ronon in capturing a rogue human-form Replicator.
- Laura Cadman, played by Jaime Ray Newman (season 2) – A USMC lieutenant who is an expert in explosives. In "Duet", she is dematerialized by a Wraith dart along with McKay. Her mind temporarily shares McKay's body due to complications in the rematerialization process, during which she acts on her attraction to Carson Beckett by kissing him. She is eventually returned safely to her own body. In "Critical Mass", she helps in locating the sabotage done to Atlantis by an operative of the Trust. Beckett pursues a relationship with her, but he says "it didn't work out" in "The Return".
- Dillon Everett, played by Clayton Landey (seasons 1–2) – A United States Marine Corps Colonel who is sent from Earth through the Stargate to help Atlantis against the incoming Wraith attack in "The Siege, Part 2". He received the ATA gene through gene therapy before coming to Atlantis. He immediately relieves both Dr. Weir and Major Sheppard of command. Col. Everett is attacked by a Wraith and ages considerably. Before Everett is shipped out with the next batch of wounded in "The Siege, Part 3", Sheppard visits him in the infirmary.
- Steven Caldwell, played by Mitch Pileggi (seasons 2–5) – A USAF Colonel and the commander of the Earth battlecruiser Daedalus. He first appears in the season 2 premiere, "The Siege, Part 3", arriving just in time to save Atlantis from the Wraith. The Pentagon wants to make Col. Caldwell military commander of Atlantis, but Major John Sheppard is promoted to Lieutenant Colonel and remains military commander of Atlantis with the support of Dr. Elizabeth Weir, President Henry Hayes and the IOA. In "Critical Mass", Caldwell is revealed to be possessed by a Goa'uld working for the Trust, but his plan to destroy Atlantis fails and the Goa'uld is eventually removed with Asgard beaming technology. Caldwell takes command of Atlantis in "The Long Goodbye" when both Weir and Sheppard are compromised by psychotic and bloodthirsty alien entities.
- Abraham Ellis, played by Michael Beach (seasons 3–5) – A USAF Colonel and the commander of the Earth ship Apollo, first appearing in "First Strike". Very intelligent, Col. Ellis does have a penchant for being somewhat gruff and extremely averse to wasting time, often cutting people off before they finish their sentences, if they go on for too long after he gets the answer he wants. He successfully completes his mission to destroy the Asuran fleet on their homeworld, though this leads to an attack on Atlantis that forces the city to abandon its planet. In "Adrift" and "Lifeline", Ellis contacts Samantha Carter at Midway Station after Atlantis fails to arrive at its intended destination. Together, they find the city and rescue Sheppard's team from the Asurans. Ellis and the Apollo return in "Be All My Sins Remember'd" to battle against the Asurans. He also appears in Stargate: The Ark of Truth (set before "First Strike"), monitoring an Ori fleet approaching Earth.
- Frank Levine, played by Gerry Durand (seasons 2–4) – An airman who first appears aboard the Daedalus in "The Intruder". He is seen again in "The Long Goodbye" taking an injured Ronon Dex to the infirmary. By the episode "The Ark", he has been promoted to captain. He is again seen piloting a puddle jumper in season 4's "Adrift".
- Sergeant Markham, played by Joseph May – A USMC non-commissioned officer and a carrier of the ATA gene. He pilots the puddle jumper in "Thirty-Eight Minutes" that gets stuck in the Gate for almost a full thirty-eight minutes. In "The Defiant One", Lt. Aiden Ford chooses Markahm to pilot on a rescue mission to retrieve Maj. Sheppard's team from a planet fifteen hours away by puddle jumper. Markham dies while defending the city from a Wraith dart fighter in "The Brotherhood".
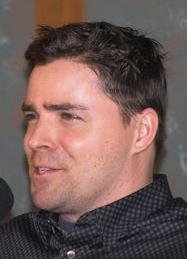
- Kavan Smith played Major Lorne.
  Evan Lorne, played by Kavan Smith (seasons 2–5) – A USAF Major and the highest-ranked officer in Atlantis after Lieutenant Colonel Sheppard. He participates in many missions. Smith described Lorne as "that sort of faithful, loyal guy that everybody kind of knows", representing a "steady constant". He first appears in the SG-1 episode "Enemy Mine", but when Kavan Smith auditioned for another, but similar, character for "Runner", an early season 2 episode of Atlantis, the producers agreed with him that the character of Lorne is suitable for the show and welcomed Smith to recreate the character. Lorne is re-introduced as part of the new personnel sent after the Wraith siege by the Daedalus. He is seen piloting a Puddle Jumper in several episodes including "Condemned" and "The Hive", but the origins of his having the ATA gene are unknown. Lorne is one of the Atlantis Expedition members in "This Mortal Coil" that the Replicators take form of, but they are all killed by Oberoth. In an alternate universe shown in the episode "The Last Man", Lorne is a Major General and appears to be in command of the SGC. Lorne also appears as the team leader of the SG-1 unit in an alternate universe in the SG-1 season 10 episode "The Road Not Taken". Lorne's mother, an art teacher, taught him how to paint on weekends when he was growing up, and Lorne rekindles this muse during his stay on Atlantis. Originally from San Francisco, California, Lorne also has a sister who has two young boys.
- Lieutenant Miller, played by Rob Avery (seasons 1, 4) – A USMC pilot who pilots a Puddle Jumper in "The Siege, part 1", taking Dr. McKay and Dr. Grodin to the Ancients' weapons array satellite. Teyla mentioned in "Coup D'etat" that Miller flew a puddle jumper and scouted out a planet. He also appears in "Reunion".
- Lieutenant Kemp, played by Niall Matter (seasons 4) – A USAF soldier who is on Major Lorne's team in "Tabula Rasa", then during "Be All My Sins Remember'd" has his own team before being killed in action on a mission to evacuate the Sions (humans) from their planet.
- Dave Kleinman, played by Kirby Morrow – A USAF Captain who is shown as a weapons officer aboard the Daedalus. He first appears in "The Siege, Part 3". He later appears as the George Hammond's weapons officer during Stargate: Universe's Incursion.
- Sergeant Stackhouse, played by Boyan Vukelic (season 1) – A USMC non-commissioned officer. He is part of Maj. Sheppard's rescue mission in "Rising" and provides a distraction while Sheppard and his team free the taken prisoner upon the hive ship. Stackhouse is patrolling Atlantis when an entity badly burns Lt. Aiden Ford in "Hide and Seek". In "Thirty-Eight Minutes", Stackhouse is aboard the puddle jumper that gets trapped in the event horizon. Stackhouse is placed in command of his own team in "Suspicion" and accompanies Maj. Sheppard during a reconnaissance mission where he temporarily takes command when Sheppard is rendered unconscious. Stackhouse makes his last appearance in "The Siege", where he is charged with securing a suitable Alpha Site for the Atlantis expedition team.
- Alicia Vega, played by Leela Savasta (season 5) – A Captain and member of a team led by Major Anne Teldy. In "Search and Rescue" she helps a team who are trapped in a collapsed building on M2S-445. In "Whispers", she is killed by one of Michael's test subjects. She was revealed to be gay by the producers. She was originally named Alison Porter, until she was renamed by the producers, and most of her scenes were cut for the final episode.

=== Recurring scientist characters ===
- Dr. Biro, played by Lindsay Collins (seasons 1–3) – A pathologist in Dr. Beckett's team. In "Hot Zone" she performs autopsies on the people who were killed by the nanovirus. In "Conversion", she participates in a medical meeting to figure out a way to cure Col. Sheppard of the Wraith retrovirus that was turning him into an Iratus bug. She also appears in season 3's "Sunday".
- Dr. Katie Brown, played by Brenda James (seasons 2–4) – A botanist who first appears in "Duet". She goes on a date with Rodney McKay, who due to an incident with a Wraith transporter had Laura Cadman's mind sharing body. Exasperated with McKay's clumsiness, Cadman takes over his body and finishes the date, complete with kiss. "Sunday" reveals that McKay avoided her for a year after that date, but in that episode they spend lunch together in the botanical lab. They become a couple by the time of "Tabula Rasa", when she names a plant after him. In "Quarantine", McKay is trapped with Katie while trying to propose to her. After the experience of the city lockdown however, he decides to postpone his proposal. In "Trio", McKay reveals that Katie mistook his actions as him breaking up with her; she has not spoken to him since and has requested transfer back to Earth.

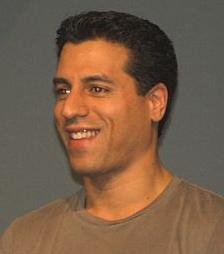
Craig Veroni played Peter Grodin

- Dr. Peter Grodin, played by Craig Veroni (season 1) – A British civilian scientist of the Atlantis Expedition, introduced as part of Dr. Weir's team studying the Ancient technology in the Antarctica outpost in "Rising". Grodin works in the control room of Atlantis in season 1, watching the city and guiding teams if there are problems in the city. He also keeps Weir informed about the latest activities in the city. Grodin remains behind on an Ancient defense satellite in "The Siege" to operate it against three incoming Wraith hive ships. The satellite destroys one of the hive ships before it malfunctions, and the remaining hive ships destroy it with Grodin on board.
- Dr. Kate Heightmeyer, played by Claire Rankin (seasons 1–4) – An American psychologist. She first appears in "The Gift", talking to Teyla about her disturbing dreams regarding the Wraith. With Dr. Beckett's help, she guides Teyla through the hypnosis that allows her to access the Wraith telepathic network. In "Duet", Heightmeyer counsels McKay on the unusual situation of sharing his body with the mind of Laura Cadman. In "Michael", she tries to explain to the Wraith-turned-human Michael why they used the retrovirus on him. In "Echoes", she talks with several Atlantis Expedition members about their apparently seeing hallucinations. Heightmeyer's final appearance is in "Doppelganger", where she is infected by an entity from a living crystal that takes on the form of John Sheppard although the entity somehow displays Sheppard's darker side. The entity kills her in her sleep by giving her an extremely vivid nightmare of jumping to her death from the central spire of Atlantis.
- Dr. Peter Kavanagh, played by Ben Cotton (seasons 1–2, 4–5) – An American scientist who decided to join the Atlantis expedition in the hope that things will be more to his liking with a civilian leader instead of a military one like at his previous job at the SGC. Kavanagh is part of the team working on helping Sheppard's team whose Puddle Jumper is stuck in an active Stargate in season 1's "Thirty-Eight Minutes". When he accuses Dr. Weir of humiliating him in front of his team, she threatens to exile him to a barren world alone if he does not return to work. Instead of recording a personal message to loved ones on Earth in "Letters from Pegasus", Kavanagh chooses to record one to General O'Neill, detailing everything he thought Weir had done wrong since their arrival. Rodney McKay agrees with Kavanagh in "The Gift" that the scientists of the Atlantis expedition should not stay and fight the approaching Wraith. Kavanagh leaves Atlantis after the siege but repeatedly commutes jobs between Earth and Atlantis for feeling unwelcome at either place. He is aboard the Daedalus en route to Earth in "Critical Mass" and becomes the prime suspect in sabotaging Atlantis, but is later found innocent. Kavanagh appears in season 4's "Midway" as part of the Midway station crew and is held hostage by the Wraith during their invasion of the Midway Space Station. Kavanagh causes and survives the destruction of the Midway Station, escaping in a Jumper escape pod with the others before being rescued by the Daedalus. He also appears in the final episode of the series, "Enemy at the Gate" as a crew member of the Daedalus.

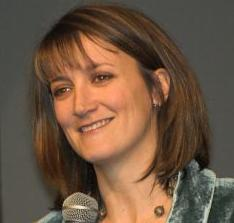
Ellie Harvie played Lindsey Novak

- Dr. Lindsey Novak, played by Ellie Harvie (season 2-3) – She first appears in the SG-1 episode "Prometheus Unbound", where the Prometheus is sent to discover the fate of the Atlantis expedition. She becomes an engineer aboard the Daedalus, which arrives at Atlantis in Atlantis episode "The Siege, Part 3" to help the city against the Wraith attack. Dr. Novak works alongside the Asgard Hermiod, and is the one responsible for transmitting Colonel Caldwell's orders to Hermiod. She makes her last appearance in "Sunday".
- Dr. David Parrish, played by Jonathon Young (season 2, 5), is a botanist tasked with exploring the plant life of the Pegasus galaxy. He was part of the team that discovered a lone Wraith commander with his enzyme sack removed, a trace of the missing Lieutenant Ford. He later discovered a plant similar to a Begonia eiromischa, a plant classed as extinct on Earth.
- Dr. Radek Zelenka, portrayed by David Nykl (seasons 1–5) – A Czech scientist and an expert on Ancient technology, second only to Rodney McKay. Zelenka frequently appears for expository scenes in the control room with the leader of the expedition and with McKay. He first appeared in the early Season 1 episode "Thirty-Eight Minutes" and has since appeared in approximately half of each season's episodes. He also appeared in the cross-over episode "The Pegasus Project" of Stargate SG-1, along with several of his Atlantis co-stars. For his portrayal of Radek Zelenka, David Nykl was nominated for a 2005 Leo Award in the category "Dramatic Series: Best Supporting Performance by a Male".

=== Other recurring Earth characters ===
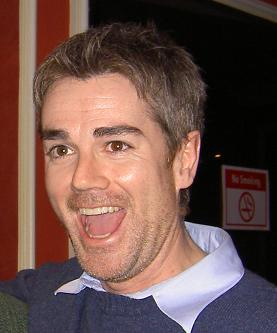
- Chuck Campbell played the technician Chuck
  Chuck, played by Chuck Campbell (seasons 1–5) – A technician who first appears in season 1's "The Brotherhood". He has since been a semi-regular character, and also appeared briefly in the Stargate SG-1 episode "The Pegasus Project". Chuck is the head Gate technician on the Atlantis expedition, taking over from Peter Grodin after Grodin's death at the end of Season 1. The character did not have a name for three seasons and was always credited as "Technician" until Dr. Weir refers to him as Chuck in "First Strike". The actor believed this to be a mistake on Torri Higginson's part, but the director decided to keep the scene anyway. The character has since been referred to as "Chuck" by McKay in season 4's "Adrift" and by Carter in "Midway". In season 5's "Tracker", Dr. Keller asks Chuck to dial the Stargate, although he does not appear on-screen. In season five, Richard Woolsey tries to impress the IOA but forgets Chuck's name, calling him "Chet." Chuck is given screen time after Woolsey walks off, where he mutters under his breath "There is no Chet." According to Martin Wood on a DVD commentary, fans also occasionally refer to him as "the Chucknician".
- Amelia Banks, played by Sharon Taylor (seasons 4–5) – A technician who first appears in "Quarantine", where she works in restoring Atlantis' power after a lockdown. She is a rather skilled kickboxer, which she demonstrates to the viewers by fighting a hybrid in "The Prodigal". She later starts a relationship with Ronon Dex by "Enemy at the Gate"
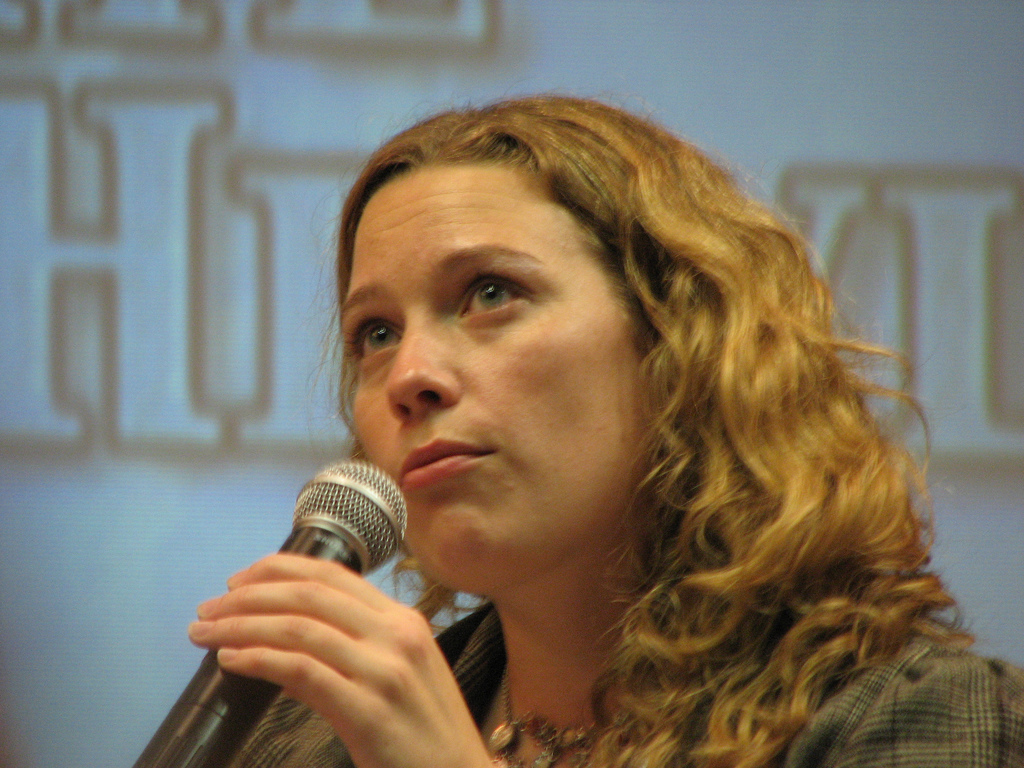
- Kate Hewlett played Jeannie Miller.
  Jeannie Miller, played by Kate Hewlett (seasons 3–5) – Rodney McKay's younger sister. She is a brilliant scientist who put her family first when she got pregnant. Residing in Vancouver, British Columbia, she is married to an English Major named Kaleb and has one daughter named Madison. She did not write any theoretical physics papers after Madison's birth, causing Jeannie and Rodney to have a long argument which resulted in him not seeing her for four years. She is first mentioned in season 1's "Hot Zone" and first appears in season 3's "McKay and Mrs. Miller", where Madison's toy train inspires her for a solution for bridging universes. The USAF and Atlantis Expedition plan to use Jeannie's idea on Project Arcturus and send Lt. Col Samantha Carter and later Rodney to persuade Jeannie to come to Atlantis. The plan works but spawns a McKay from the parallel universe, with whom Jeannie bonds more than her real brother. Toward the end of the episode, Jeannie and the real McKay make peace. In season 4's "Miller's Crossing", an organization kidnaps Jeannie from her house to cure the boss's daughter from leukaemia, and Jeannie and McKay collaborate once again before being rescued. She again appears in "The Last Man", and also goes to Atlantis in the episode "The Shrine". Kate Hewlett is David Hewlett's (Rodney McKay) younger real life sister. The script of "Letters from Pegasus" originally mentioned a brother, but since David Hewlett has five younger sisters, he asked the writers to change the line to "sister". The producers ended up hiring Kate Hewlett because producer Martin Gero saw a play with her.

=== Stargate crossover characters ===
Several characters who may be better known for their role in Stargate SG-1 have made appearances in Atlantis. They are:

- Samantha Carter (played by Amanda Tapping) in "Letters from Pegasus", "Grace Under Pressure", "McKay and Mrs. Miller", (starring role in Atlantis season 4), "Search and Rescue", "Enemy at the Gate"
- Hank Landry (played by Beau Bridges) in "The Intruder", "Critical Mass", "No Man's Land", "The Return" (two-parter)
- Jack O'Neill (played by Richard Dean Anderson) in "Rising (Part 1)", "The Real World", "The Return" (two-parter)
- Daniel Jackson (played by Michael Shanks) in "Rising (Part 1)", "First Contact", "The Lost Tribe" (two-parter)
- Teal'c (played by Christopher Judge) in "Reunion", "Midway"
- George Hammond (played by Don S. Davis) in "Home"
- Walter Harriman (played by Gary Jones) in "Home", "Letters from Pegasus", "Critical Mass", "No Man's Land", "Misbegotten", "The Return" (two-parter), "Miller's Crossing", "Midway", "Brain Storm", "Enemy at the Gate"
- Bill Lee (played by Bill Dow) in "Critical Mass", "The Return" (two-parter), "Adrift", "Lifeline", "Outcast", "Midway"
- Malcolm Barrett (played by Peter Flemming) in "Critical Mass", "Miller's Crossing"
- Sergeant Siler (played by Dan Shea) in "Rising (Part 1)", "The Return (Part 1)"
- Kevin Marks (played by Martin Christopher) in "Be All My Sins Remember'd", "Search and Rescue", "First Contact", "The Lost Tribe", "Enemy at the Gate"
- Paul Davis (played by Colin Cunningham) in "Enemy at the Gate"

== Recurring alien characters ==
=== Ancients ===
The Ancients are the original builders of the Stargate network, who by the time of Stargate SG-1 have Ascended beyond corporeal form into a higher plane of existence. The humans of Earth are the "second evolution" of the Ancients. The Ancients (originally known as the Alterans) colonized the Milky Way galaxy millions of years ago and built a great empire. They also colonized the Pegasus galaxy and seeded human life there, before being driven out by the Wraith. The civilization of the Ancients in the Milky Way was decimated thousands of years ago by a plague, and those who did not learn to Ascend died out. With few exceptions, the Ascended Ancients respect free will and (with some exceptions) refuse to interfere in the affairs of the material galaxy. However, their legacy is felt profoundly throughout Stargate universe, from their technologies such as Stargates and Atlantis, to the Ancient Technology Activation gene, that they introduced into the human genome through crossbreeding.

- Janus, played by Gildart Jackson (season 1) – An Ancient scientist who lived during the first siege of Atlantis by the Wraith 10,000 years ago. He is named for Janus, the two-faced Roman god that represented time and change. Janus appears only once in the series, in "Before I Sleep", but he and his inventions are referred to repeatedly in both Stargate Atlantis and Stargate SG-1. Against the orders of the Atlantean High Council, Janus created a time machine and integrated it into a Puddle Jumper. An alternate Elizabeth Weir, who accidentally travels back through time in "Before I Sleep", encounters Janus and asks for help, but the Atlantean Council is unwilling to risk damage to the timeline. Janus disobeys his superiors and helps Weir to remain behind in stasis so that she can aid her future self saving the city. Before he leaves with his fellow Ancients to Earth, he is hopeful to build another Puddle Jumper capable of time travel. The SG-1 team eventually finds such a Puddle Jumper in the Milky Way galaxy in the SG-1 episode "It's Good to Be King" and use it in "Moebius". As revealed in "The Lost Tribe", Janus was also responsible for the creation of the Aterro Device that he hid in his secret lab in Atlantis.
- Melia, played by Melia McClure (season 1) – A member of the Atlantean High Council during the first siege of Atlantis some ten millennia ago. She is first seen as a hologram in "Rising", describing the history of the Ancients in the Pegasus Galaxy. In the episode "Before I Sleep", Melia explains the Wraith siege of Atlantis to an alternate version of Elizabeth Weir, who travelled back through time. While sympathetic to Weir and Janus, Melia agrees with the other members of the council to not send Dr. Weir back to her own time. Melia is last seen returning to Earth through the Stargate with her fellow Ancients.

=== Asurans ===
Artificial life-forms composed of nanites, introduced in episode "Progeny" of season 3 of Stargate Atlantis. They are similar to the human-form Replicators of Stargate SG-1 and so are called that in the show. The Asurans were created by the Ancients to combat the Wraith but were ultimately abandoned and seemingly destroyed by the Ancients for being too dangerous, although they were not the weapon against the Wraith the Ancients believed they could be. Extremely aggressive, a small number of nanites thrived and eventually built an advanced civilization.

In season 4, Rodney McKay activates the Asurans' attack code, causing them to attack the Wraith, but this eventually comes to threaten all the inhabitants of Pegasus, as a twisted logic for defeating the Wraith was to annihilate their food source (that is, the humans). Because of their danger to humans, they are ultimately destroyed in the episode "Be All My Sins Remember'd".

- Niam, played by John O'Callaghan (season 3) – The leader of a faction of Asurans who believe that their goal should be Ascension. He meets Elizabeth Weir and her team in season 3's "Progeny" and convinces Oberoth to keep them alive. Niam asks the Atlantis team to remove the Asurans' base code for aggression, which he believes is preventing them from Ascending. When he flees with them to Atlantis in a Puddle Jumper, his brethren discover his treachery and reset his programming, and the Atlantis team is forced to jettison him into space. In "The Return", Sheppard and his team retrieve Niam's inert body from orbit to gain access to the Replicator base code within him to immobilize the Asuran invaders. When Niam unexpectedly awakens during the process, McKay disintegrates him with an Anti-Replicator Gun.
- Oberoth, played by David Ogden Stiers (seasons 3–4) – The leader of the Asurans and an enemy of the Atlantis Expedition. In his first appearance in "Progeny", he informs Elizabeth Weir and her team that his people have no interest in an alliance against the Wraith. After learning of their residence in Atlantis, he orders the Asuran City Ship to attack Atlantis and is aboard the City Ship when it self-destructs over Lantea. In "First Strike", Oberoth has reconstituted his physical body from the Replicator collective and now regards Atlantis as a threat that must be destroyed at all costs. In "Lifeline", Weir (who is being sustained by Replicator nanites) makes contact with Oberoth and fools him to buy Sheppard and the others enough time to complete their objective, but Oberoth eventually overcomes Weir's control and captures her.

In the series, the replicators are referred to as Asurans a couple of times in the episode where they are introduced ("Progeny"), but, afterwards, they are always mentioned as replicators.

=== Athosians ===
The Athosians are a group of hunters, farmers, and traders from the planet Athos. First introduced in "Rising", they are the first humans encountered by the Atlantis Expedition in the Pegasus galaxy. The Athosians were once technologically advanced, but reverted to a pre-industrial state to avoid the Wraith. Following their contact with the Expedition, the Athosians move to Lantea and their leader, Teyla Emmagan, joins Major Sheppard's team. In "The Gift", it is revealed that some Athosians possess Wraith DNA, resulting from an old Wraith experiment to make humans more "palatable". This allows these individuals to sense the presence of Wraith, to tap into their telepathic communications, and to control Wraith technology. In the third-season episode "The Return", the Athosians are asked to leave Lantea by a group of surviving Ancients reclaiming Atlantis from Earth. The Athosian population is subsequently found to have disappeared from New Athos in "Missing". The search for the missing Athosians and their fate at the hands of the rogue Wraith Michael contributes to a major plot arc near the end of the fourth season.

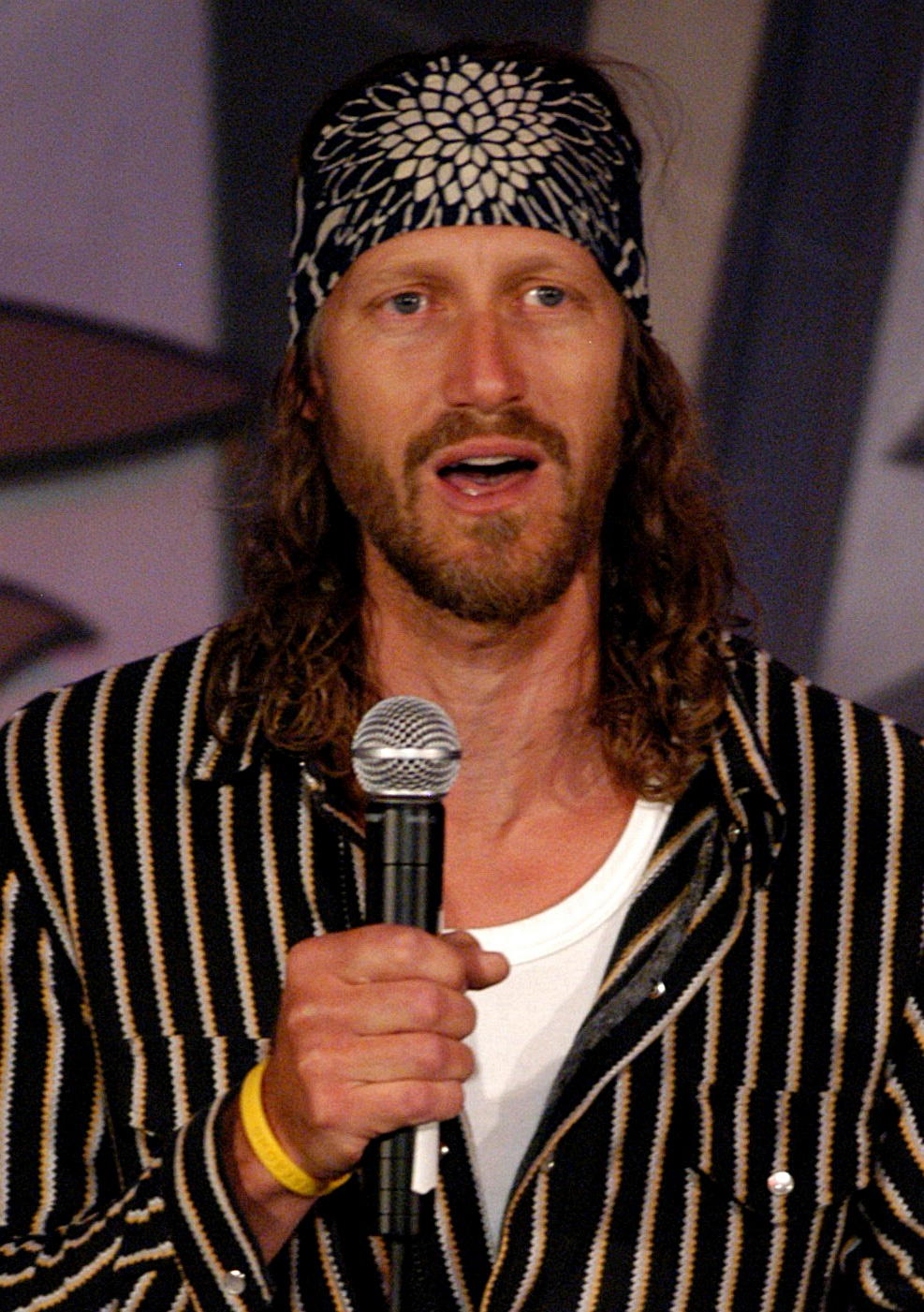
Christopher Heyerdahl played both Halling and Todd the Wraith

- Halling, played by Christopher Heyerdahl (seasons 1, 4) – An Athosian man of some standing and the father of Jinto. In "Rising", he meets a team from Atlantis and leads them to his village to meet Teyla. He is one of several Athosians captured in a Wraith culling, and is later rescued by Major Sheppard. Afterwards, Halling moves to Atlantis with the other Athosians. When Teyla is trapped in a puddle jumper in "Thirty-Eight Minutes", Halling asks Weir to allow his people to help her to prepare for death, which Weir refuses. In "Suspicion", Halling reacts angrily to being questioned about the possibility of an Athosian collaborating with the Wraith. He later voices his concerns to Teyla about their people's standing with the Atlantis Expedition, and informs Dr. Elizabeth Weir of the Athosians' decision to move to the mainland, against Teyla's wishes. In season 4, Halling is abducted, along with the other Athosians, by the Wraith Michael. The Atlantis team finds and frees him, along with a group of other captive Athosians, in "The Kindred". Christopher Heyerdahl had previously appeared as the human alien Pallan in the Stargate SG-1 episode "Revisions", and later played the recurring Wraith "Todd" in Atlantis.
- Kanaan, played by Patrick Sabongui (seasons 4–5) – An Athosian whose name is first given in "Missing". Teyla describes him as a "natural leader", but "burdened by an overly cautious nature". He and Teyla have been friends since childhood, but only recently entered a relationship. Kanaan appears onscreen for the first time in "The Kindred", where it is revealed that he has the same ability to sense the Wraith as Teyla, over which they bonded as children. In the episode, he apparently calls to Teyla telepathically for help, but it transpires that this is a trap by Michael to obtain her child. Kanaan himself has been transformed into a human-Wraith hybrid by Michael, though Teyla is able to reach his true self. In "Search and Rescue", he helps Teyla and her team escape from Michael's cruiser. In "The Seed", it is mentioned that Kanaan has been restored to his original self using Carson Beckett's Wraith retrovirus, but is being interned with the rest of the former Hybrids on the mainland at the orders of the IOA.
- Jinto and Wex, played by Reece Thompson and Casey Dubois (season 1) – Two Athosian boys and best friends. They first appear in "Rising", where they are playing in the forest and encounter a reconnaissance team from Atlantis, led by Colonel Sumner. In "Hide and Seek", having moved to Atlantis with the rest of the Athosians, they sneak out of their quarters to play. Jinto unknowingly hides inside an Ancient transporter, and is teleported to another part of the city. There, he found an Ancient device and accidentally released an energy creature trapped inside. Sheppard eventually finds the transporter that Jinto had used, and returns the boy to his father.
- Charin, played by Brenda McDonald (seasons 1–2) – An Athosian elder and an old friend of Teyla Emmagan. When Teyla was a child, she would paint Charin pictures while singing songs of the Ancestors. Teyla is fond of her tuttleroot soup, and has been learning the recipe herself. In "The Gift", Charin tells Teyla that the reason she can sense the Wraith is because one of her ancestors was amongst those taken by the Wraith and then inexplicably returned, different from what they were before. In "Critical Mass", Charin's heart is failing but she refuses a pacemaker, instead asking Teyla to perform the Ring Ceremony to celebrate her dying. Her last words to Teyla are "our journey begins".

=== Genii ===
The Genii appear to be simple farmers, but are in fact a military society with technology comparable to late 1940s Earth. First appearing in "Underground", the Genii were forced to hide in underground bunkers due to Wraith attacks. They have since devoted their efforts to developing technologies, such as fission bombs, with which to strike back at the Wraith. They become enemies of the Atlantis Expedition in the first season and once try to invade Atlantis, though after a coup d'état in the second season they have been more favorable towards the city.

- Chief Cowen, played by Colm Meaney (seasons 1–2) – The leader of the Genii in the first two seasons of Stargate Atlantis. In "Underground", he agrees to an alliance with the Atlantis Expedition after John Sheppard and Rodney McKay stumble upon a Genii underground bunker. He authorizes a joint mission to obtain a Wraith data storage device from a hive-ship. At the end of the mission he attempts to double-cross the Atlantis team, but Sheppard anticipates his move and his team takes the data storage device. In "The Storm", Cowen orders Commander Acastus Kolya to launch an assault on Atlantis, despite Kolya's objections that his forces are not ready. In "Coup D'etat", Cowen masterminds a plot to abduct an Atlantis team led by Major Lorne, in order to gain access to the ATA gene. He also sends Ladon Radim to Atlantis, apparently as the planner of a coup d'état against him, so as to lure Sheppard and his team into a trap. However, Ladon is actually planning to topple Cowen, and plants a nuclear bomb beneath the warehouse where Cowen has placed his operations. The bomb eliminates Cowen and his personal guard, resulting in Radim becoming the leader of the Genii.
- Acastus Kolya, played by Robert Davi (seasons 1, 3, 5) – Introduced in "The Storm" as a ruthless Genii military leader. He is a persistent adversary of the Atlantis Expedition (and of John Sheppard in particular) in the first 3 seasons of the show. Following Kolya's defeat in "The Storm" and "The Eye", where Cowen ordered Kolya and his soldiers to invade Atlantis, Kolya falls from Cowen's graces and takes his own initiative. Kolya captures Sheppard and his team in "The Brotherhood", but Sheppard later spares the defenseless Kolya, assuring him that he would not be so forgiving next time. Kolya disappears afterward and is presumed dead; in "Coup D'etat" Ladon Radim believes that Cowen had him killed. Kolya returns in "Common Ground", where he captures Sheppard with the intention of trading him for Radim and taking over the Genii government himself. Sheppard soon manages to escape and promises to shoot Kolya on sight should they ever meet again. Kolya and Sheppard accidentally meet again in "Irresponsible", but Kolya is once again outmaneuvered by Sheppard. When Kolya refuses to surrender, Sheppard shoots him in a quick-draw shootout. Despite the character's apparent death in Season 3, the character returned in the season 5 episode Remnants though this is eventually revealed to be an hallucination created by a piece of alien technology.

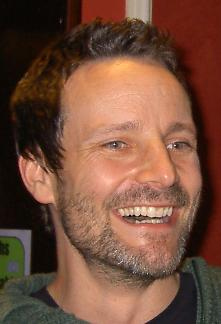
Ryan Robbins played Ladon Radim

- Ladon Radim, played by Ryan Robbins (seasons 1–3) – First appears as Acastus Kolya's aide in "The Storm" and "The Eye". He oversees their operation to invade Atlantis from the control room; John Sheppard knocks him out in order to raise the Stargate shield, killing 55 en route Genii reinforcements. Radim retreats from the city along with the other Genii. In "Coup D'etat", Radim contacts Atlantis with an offer of a ZPM in exchange for materiel support in a coup against Cowen. This is apparently revealed to be a ruse by Cowen after Sheppard and his team are captured while attempting to steal the ZPM. However, after Radim receives news that Dr. Beckett has cured his sister and the other Genii hostages on Atlantis of radiation sickness, he reveals that he has in fact been planning a coup after all, and releases the Atlantis team before enacting his plan to kill Cowen and his elite guard with a hidden nuclear bomb. Radim takes over the Genii government, billing it as a "bloodless coup" as no deaths occurred on Genii territory. After Sheppard is captured by Kolya in "Common Ground", Radim travels to Atlantis to assist, motivated in no small part by the prospect of neutralizing a threat to his nascent government. Kolya demands that Radim be handed over to him in exchange for Sheppard. However, Radim is able to locate Kolya's base, allowing Sheppard's rescue. Radim appears again in "The Return", to offer Ronon Dex and Teyla Emmagan a place with the Genii after the two are evicted from Atlantis by a group of Ancients. Although they turn down his offer, afterwards Teyla expresses to Ronon that working with the Genii might be the galaxy's best hope without the Atlantis Expedition.
- Sora, played by Erin Chambers (season 1) – A Genii soldier and daughter of Tyrus. Teyla Emmagan has known her since she was a child, and considers them friends. In "Underground", Sora is unhappy to be left behind from a joint Atlantis-Genii mission to obtain a Wraith data storage device. After the team is forced to leave her father Tyrus behind on the Wraith hive-ship, Sora blames Teyla for his death. In the two-part episode "The Storm" and "The Eye", Sora is part of Acastus Kolya's team sent to take Atlantis when the city is largely evacuated due to a hurricane. When she learns that Teyla has entered the city, she disobeys Kolya's orders and sets off to avenge her father's death. However, Teyla bests her in single combat, but refuses to kill her. Together, they help the injured Carson Beckett reach the safety of the control room before the storm hits. Afterwards, Sora is kept prisoner in Atlantis. In the original concept of "The Siege", she is returned to her people as part of the deal to obtain Genii-made fission bombs for the defense of Atlantis. However, the scene was cut due to time constraints.

=== Wraith ===
The main antagonists of Stargate Atlantis, the Wraith are the dominant species in the Pegasus galaxy. They are biologically immortal hive-dwelling humanoids who feed on the "life-force" of humans. They evolved from a creature known as the Iratus bug, as the bugs began acquiring the human characteristics of the persons they were feeding on. The Ancients encountered the Wraith, and after a long war with them, were driven out of Pegasus 10,000 years ago. Left largely unrivaled, the Wraith maintained the human worlds of Pegasus as sources of sustenance. The Wraith is prematurely awoken from hibernation by the Atlantis Expedition's activity in the Pegasus galaxy, leaving them with a shortage of humans to feed upon, sparking bloody conflicts among the Wraith themselves.

- "Michael", played by Connor Trinneer (seasons 2–5) and Brent Stait (only in "Allies" due to a scheduling conflict; Trinneer still provided the voice)) – A Wraith whom the Atlantis Expedition transformed into a human in season 2's "Michael" in their first successful test of Dr. Carson Beckett's Wraith retrovirus. As the process eliminates memory, Atlantis personnel give Michael a fabricated history and attempt to integrate him into the city, but Michael eventually learns the truth. He escapes custody and reverts into a Wraith, rejoining his people. In "Allies", it is revealed that the other Wraith do not accept him either since his transformation. After several bitter experiences with the Atlantis Expedition and his fellow Wraith in seasons 2 and 3, Michael sets about building his own personal army in "Vengeance", mixing Iratus bug DNA with that of humans to create a new creature, destroying several human populations in the process. In "The Kindred", Michael is revealed to be responsible for distributing the Hoffan Wraith-poisoning drug to several human worlds, and for the abduction of the Athosians in "Missing" to use in his experiments. Michael has subjected himself to the treatments, and no longer possesses the Wraith feeding organs. Following the events of "The Last Man" and "Search and Rescue", the Daedalus destroys Michael's cruiser. In "The Seed", the IOA believes Michael to be dead, although the Atlantis team suspects otherwise. He did survive and later, in "The Prodigal", invaded Atlantis but was defeated and finally killed by Teyla who knocked him off Atlantis' Control Tower sending him falling thousands of feet to his death.
- "Steve", played by James Lafazanos (season 1), is a Wraith who is captured by the Atlantis Expedition in "Suspicion", where he is lured into a trap using a Wraith tracking device discovered in Teyla Emmagan's necklace. He is held in Atlantis, though he assures his captors that by doing so they have only ensured their own doom. Major Sheppard names him "Steve" after he refuses to give his true name. In "Poisoning the Well", Dr. Elizabeth Weir allows Steve to be used to test a Hoffan drug designed to make humans immune to feeding, despite her ethical reservations. The test is successful, but Steve dies shortly afterwards from an unexpected reaction. Though this is a violation of the Geneva Convention regarding the treatment of prisoners of war, Major Sheppard argues that the Wraith are not subject to it—they would have eaten everyone if they had attended the meeting.
- "Todd", played by Christopher Heyerdahl (seasons 3–5) – A Wraith who first appears in season 3's "Common Ground" as a prisoner of Acastus Kolya. He is used to torture Sheppard by feeding on him repeatedly, but they later form an alliance and help each other escape. "Todd" gets a "name" in the fourth season. He returns in "The Seer" to forge an alliance with Atlantis against the Asurans, but is stranded on Atlantis after the destruction of his hive ship. He remains in captivity working with McKay on the Asuran base code until the episode "Be All My Sins Remember'd", where he gains his freedom after convincing seven hive-ships to join Atlantis in battling the Asurans. In the alternate future of "The Last Man", Todd dies fighting alongside Ronon Dex to destroy one of Michael's research facilities, the two sacrificing themselves to allow Ronon's strike force to escape before setting off their explosives.

=== Other recurring characters ===
- Hermiod, voiced by Trevor Devall (seasons 2–3) – An Asgard technician assigned to the Daedalus. Hermiod is introduced during the Daedalus' first mission to Atlantis in "The Siege, Part 3" and recurs throughout season 2. He is tasked with operation of the ship's Asgard transporter and hyperdrive engine, working primarily with Lindsey Novak. Hermiod mutters to himself when he is displeased with the crew's demands, although his Asgard language is actually normal English played backward. The producers gave him "a little bit of an attitude problem", being an angry foreigner utterly convinced of his own brilliance above those around him.

== See also ==
- List of Stargate SG-1 characters
- List of Stargate Universe characters
