= Tau'ri characters in Stargate =

Tau'ri characters in Stargate may refer to:

- Tau'ri characters in Stargate SG-1
- Tau'ri characters in Stargate Atlantis
