= Dean Marshall =

Canadian film, television and theater actor, writer and director

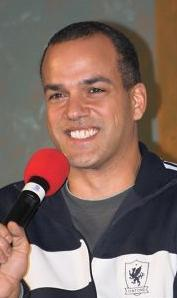
- Marshall at Wolf Pegasus Three, 2008
- Born: Montreal, Quebec, Canada
- Occupations: Actor, Writer and director
- Years active: 1993-present

Dean Marshall is a Canadian film, television, and theater, actor, writer, and director. He is known for portraying Sgt. Bates on Syfy original series Stargate Atlantis, and Carter on both Da Vinci's Inquest, and Da Vinci's City Hall.

== Early life ==
Marshall began performing at a young age in a steel band. His family was originally from Trinidad and Tobago, but immigrated to Canada before he was born. He was born and raised in a Montreal suburb.

== Career ==
Before acting he joined the Canadian Forces at age 18, and served for some 6 years. Since 1993, he acts, writes and directs in the television, film, and theater business. Marshall has taken on diverse roles ranging from Malcolm Bridges, the crazy fearless officer, in the action packed adventure film Babylon 5: The Legend of the Rangers, to the smart laid-back Detective Carter in Da Vinci's City Hall.

Since his career took off in 1993, Marshall resides in Vancouver.

== Filmography ==
Year	Title	Role	Notes
1993	Urban Angel	Unknown	1 episode, season 1
1993	Save My Lost Nigga Soul	Unknown	
1993	The Hidden Room	Max	1 episode, season 5
1995	Tommy Boy	Frat Boy	Film
1995	Rude	Joe	Film
1995	The Great Defender	Convenience Store Clerk	1 episode, season 4
1996	TekWar	Officer Schueler	1 episode, season 1
1998	The Vigil	Uncredited	Film
1998	NightMan	Mike	1 episode, season 2
1999	Poltergeist: The Legacy	Chad	1 episode, season 2
2000	Honey, I Shrunk the Kids: The TV Show	Larson E. Daniels	1 episode, season 3
2000	First Wave	Cop #2	1 episode, season 3
2001	Strange Frequency	Paramedic #1	TV film
2001–2005	Da Vinci's Inquest	Constable Carter	20 episodes, season 1-7
1999–2002	The Outer Limits	Captain William Hinman / Corporal Hanford	1 episode, season 5; 1 episode, season 7
2001	Stephen King's Dead Zone	Night School Guard	1 episode, season 1
2001	Cold Squad	Kevin Garner	1 episode, season 5
2002	Babylon 5: The Legend of the Rangers	Malcolm Bridges	Film
2002	Monk	Cop in Lobby	2 episodes, season 1
2003	Tom Stone	Max LaBruce	1 episode, season 2
2003	Jeremiah	Gary	1 episode, season 2
2004–2008	Stargate Atlantis	Bates	9 episodes, season 1; 1 episode, season 4
2004	The Life	Male Cop #2	TV film
2005	Best Friends	Second police officer	TV film
2005–2006	Da Vinci's City Hall	Detective Carter	8 episodes, season 1
2006	Ties That Bind	Det. Barlow	Unknown
2006	Smallville	Seattle Police Officer	1 episode, season 6
2007	Masters of Science Fiction	The General's Aide	1 episode, season 1
2007	Intelligence	Bob Clay	2 episodes, season 2
2008	Eureka	Dr. Herrera	1 episode, season 3
2009	2012	Ark Communications Officer	Film
2009	Held Hostage	Leland	TV film
2010	Life Unexpected	Dave	1 episode, season 2
2010	Fringe	Uniform	1 episode, season 3
2013	She Made Them Do It	Tucker Shift	TV film

== Theater ==
Year	Title	Role	Notes
1993	Playboy of the West Indies	Unknown	
1994	Romeo and Juliet	Unknown	
1994–1996; 2010–2012	Riff Raff	Minor	Writer and director

== Voice work ==
Year	Title	Role	Notes	Source
2000	Kessen	Kiyomasa Kato / Teruzumi Akashi	Voice actor	
