= Michelle Morgan (actress) =

Canadian actress (born 1981)

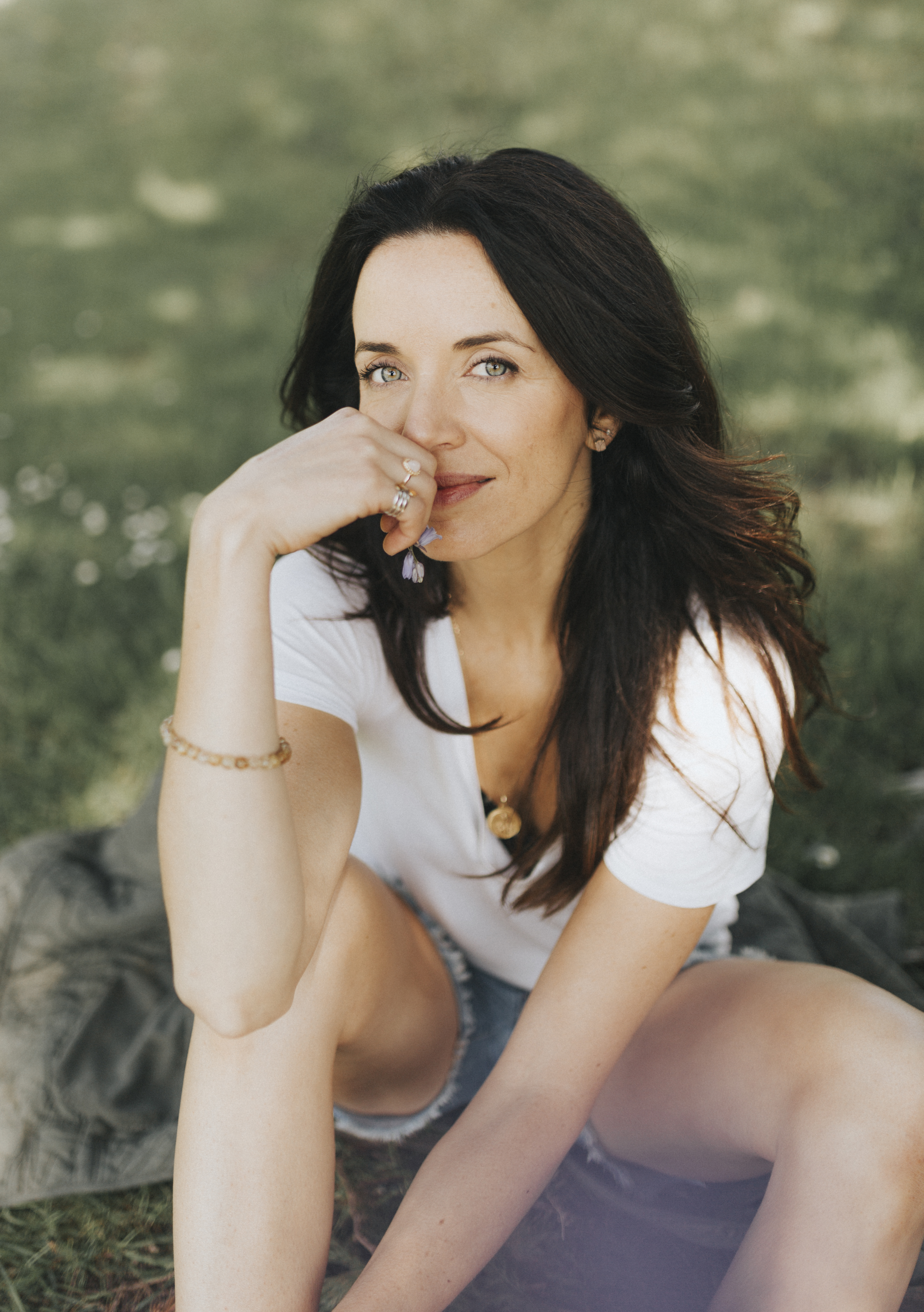
- Morgan interviewed for Count Gore de Vol in 2009
- Born: July 16, 1981 (age 45); Calgary, Alberta, Canada
- Occupations: Actress, film producer, director
- Years active: 1999–present
- Spouse: Derek Tisdelle (m. 2012)
- Children: 3
- Website: www.medanofilms.com

Michelle Morgan (born July 16, 1981) is a Canadian actress, producer and director best known for her role as Lou Fleming on the CBC/Up TV series Heartland.

== Personal life ==
Michelle Morgan was born in Calgary and grew up in Toronto and Vancouver. After studying Theatre and Classical Literature at the University of Toronto, she went on to pursue a career in theatre and film.

Morgan is an advocate for women's rights and has volunteered at women's shelters across Canada for the past 15 years. She served as the "I Am Courage" campaign ambassador for the Brenda Strafford Centre for the Prevention of Domestic Violence and the "My Homefront" campaign ambassador for Homefront, a Calgary-based nonprofit that serves victims of domestic abuse.

On June 30, 2012 Morgan married Derek Tisdelle. They have three children, Mara Carmen, Noah Santiago, and Celeste.

== Career ==
In 2007, Morgan began her role as Lou on the CBC/Up TV series Heartland. The same year, she appeared in the zombie film Diary of the Dead.

In 2008 she appeared on Stargate Atlantis as FRAN (Friendly Replicator Android) in the episodes "Be All My Sins Remember'd" and "Ghost in the Machine".

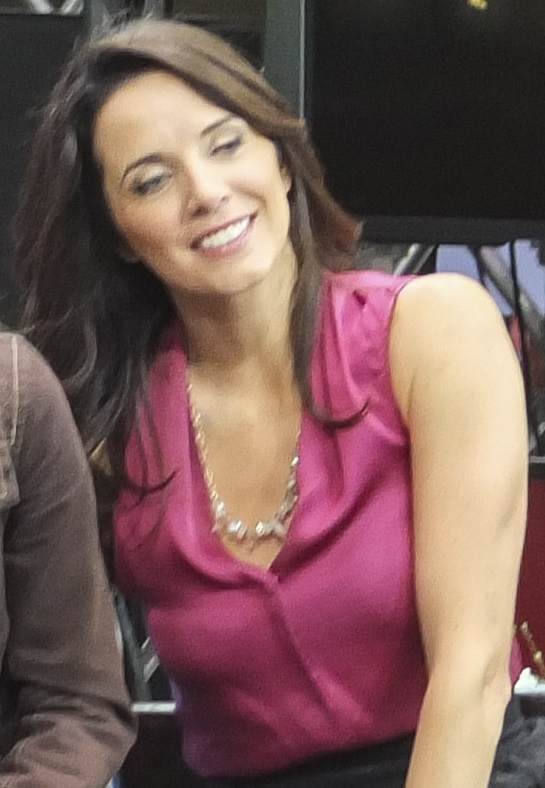
Morgan in 2015

In 2018, she founded her own film business, "Medano Films".

Her first short film, "Mi Madre, My Father" (2017), with Stephen Amell, was selected by Telefilm Canada for the "Not Short On Talent Corner" at Cannes Film Festival in May 2018. Michelle's debut film has screened at festivals such as Hollyshorts, the Brooklyn Women's Film Festival and the Vancouver Short Film Festival.

In 2019, Michelle directed three episodes of the new CBC digital series "Hudson", a spin off of the long running series Heartland.

Michelle's second short film, "Save Yourself" (2019), is a romantic comedy set on the beaches of Tofino, British Columbia.

In 2020, Michelle was selected to join the Women in the "Director's Chair, Story & Leadership Program" where she will develop her feature film project, a post apocalyptic western titled "The Plains".

In 2024, Michelle starred in the Roku Original "Jingle Bell Love" with Joey McIntyre.

== Filmography ==
=== Film ===
Year	Film	Role	Notes
2007	Diary of the Dead	Debra Moynihan	
2008	Confessions of a Porn Addict	The Wrong Felice	
2017	Ice Blue	Maria	
2018	Deep Space	Athea Hixson	
2020	Sugar Daddy	Sarah	
2022	The Bad Seed Returns	Angela Grossman	
2024	Jingle Bell Love	Jessica McFall	
2025	Jingle Bell Wedding	Jessica McFall	

=== Short film ===
Year	Film	Role	Notes
2011	The Imposter	Janet	Executive producer
2018	Mi madre, My father	Anita	Writer, director and producer
2019	Save Yourself	Angela	Director and producer

=== Television film ===
Year	Film	Role	Notes
1999	Road Rage	Rebecca	
2007	Fire Serpent	Donna Marks	
2010	A Heartland Christmas	Samantha Louise 'Lou' Fleming	
2016	The Rooftop Christmas Tree	Sarah Wright	
2017	While You Were Dating	Kim	
2017	A Very Country Christmas	Mary	
2021	Gone Mom	Michelle Troconis	

=== Series ===
Year	Film	Role	Notes
2006	Final 24	Lauren Bessette	TV series documentary; 1 Episode
2007–present	Heartland	Samantha Louise 'Lou' Fleming/Lou Fleming-Morris/Lou Fleming	Main cast 209 Episodes; Also directed 3 episodes
2007	Across the River to Motor City	Counter Waitress	2 Episodes
2008	Stargate Atlantis	F.R.A.N. / Dr. Elizabeth Weir	Episode: "Be All My Sins Remember'd"/ "Ghost in the Machine"
2008	The L Word	Abigail	Episode: "Look Out, Here They Come!"
2010	Bunny Hug	Celeste	Mini-series; 3 Episodes
2013	Package Deal	Stacey	1 Episode
2015	Supernatural	Jemma Verson	Episode: "The Things They Carried"
2018	The Good Doctor	Quinn's Mother	Episode: "She"
2019–2020	Batwoman	Gabi Kane	2 Episodes
2024	Virgin River	Mandy	1 Episode

=== Web series ===
Year	Film	Role	Notes
2018	Deep Six	Athea	Main cast; 6 Episodes
2019	Hudson	Samantha Louise 'Lou' Fleming	Heartland spin-off; 4 Episodes; Directed 3 Episodes
