= Craig Veroni =

Canadian actor (born 1969)

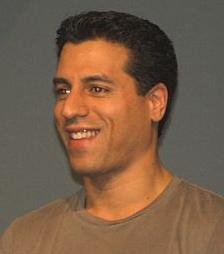
- Craig Veroni at Wolf Pegasus One in London, 2006
- Born: Craig Veroni; 15 February 1969 (age 57); Cape Town, South Africa
- Education: Studio 58
- Occupations: Actor, real estate agent
- Spouse: Tamara Dian McKay (m. 2002)
- Website: craigveroni.ca

Craig Veroni (born 15 February 1969) is a South African-born Canadian actor from Vancouver best known for his role as Dr. Peter Grodin on Stargate Atlantis.

== Biography ==
He was born in Cape Town, South Africa. His family immigrated to Canada when Veroni was eight. Veroni first acted in school plays at Port Moody Secondary School, and later trained at Vancouver's Studio 58.

Veroni is most well known for his role as Peter Grodin on Stargate Atlantis. Grodin was a British scientist who was part of the expedition to Atlantis. He appeared in nine episodes in Season 1 before being killed off in the penultimate episode. He is also known for his role as Amir in the feature film Two For The Money, with Matthew McConaughey, Al Pacino and Rene Russo.

Veroni also had recurring roles on Da Vinci's Inquest and Dark Angel. He made guest appearances on several other shows filmed in the Vancouver area, such as Smallville, Jeremiah, Tru Calling, Blood Ties, Battlestar Galactica, and Psych.

He now works as a realtor in Vancouver, BC, where he resides. His Facebook page prominently features an AI-generated version of himself speaking about real estate and current events in Greater Vancouver.
