= First Strike (Stargate Atlantis) =

- Stargate Atlantis episode
- Episode no.: Season 3 Episode 20
- Directed by: Martin Wood
- Written by: Martin Gero
- Production code: 320
- Original air date: February 5, 2007

Guest appearances
- Michael Beach as Abe Ellis; Jewel Staite as Jennifer Keller; Kavan Smith as Evan Lorne; David Nykl as Radek Zelenka; David Ogden Stiers as Oberoth; Chuck Campbell as Chuck; Heather Doerksen as Apollo tech; Donna Soars as Coleman; Jay Williams as Adams

Episode chronology
← Previous "Vengeance"	Next → "Adrift"
- Stargate Atlantis (season 3)

"First Strike" is the 60th episode and the third season finale of the science fiction television series Stargate Atlantis. The episode originally aired in Canada on February 5, 2007, on The Movie Network, and subsequently aired March 14 on Sky One in the United Kingdom, and June 22 on the United States Sci Fi Channel. It was written by executive producer Martin Gero, and directed by Martin Wood. The episode is the first of a three-parter, in which the new Earth ship Apollo arrives at Atlantis to conduct a preemptive strike against the Asurans before they can launch a fleet to attack Earth.

"First Strike" was a beginning to a new direction for the series. It aired alongside "Unending", the series finale of Stargate SG-1. At the time it was considered the best episode the producers had done, and featured one of the longest visual effects sequences in the series. The episode earned Stargate Atlantis the strongest ratings since the mid-season hiatus, and was generally well-received.

== Plot ==
The newest Earth warship, Apollo, arrives at Atlantis. Its commander, Abe Ellis (Michael Beach), informs the Expedition that recon missions have discovered the Asurans building ships on their homeworld, which the IOA believe will be used to attack Earth. As the ships are built from only conventional materials, Apollo has been assigned to destroy them in a preemptive strike, using the new "Horizon" weapons delivery system. Apollo successfully carries out the mission over the objections of Weir (Torri Higginson), who feels her authority being increasingly sidelined.

Soon after Apollo returns to Atlantis, the Asurans retaliate by launching a Stargate satellite that fires an energy beam, disabling the Apollo before zeroing in on Atlantis. The beam will deplete the city's shield in just under 30 hours, and with the satellite and its active Stargate over the city, the Expedition cannot evacuate using their own Stargate. McKay (David Hewlett) and Zelenka (David Nykl) submerge the city to mitigate the effect of the beam, but this only buys them nine more hours before the city is destroyed.

Realizing that the only way to save Atlantis is to move the city out of the satellite's range, McKay and Sheppard (Joe Flanigan) decide to use their one Zero Point Module and the geothermal power station found in "Submersion" to power the stardrive. Lorne (Kavan Smith) and a squadron of F-302s are sent to temporarily block the beam using a large moon fragment, so that shield power can be redirected into the stardrive. However, the beam resumes as the city lifts off, briefly grazing the central tower before the shield can be restored. Weir is severely injured and is taken to the infirmary by Beckett's replacement, Jennifer Keller (Jewel Staite). Atlantis jumps into hyperspace, but the stardrive unexpectedly shuts down well before they reach their destination. McKay realizes that they are marooned in deep space, with only 24 hours before the shield runs out of power and the city's occupants are exposed to space.

== Production ==
=== Writing and casting ===
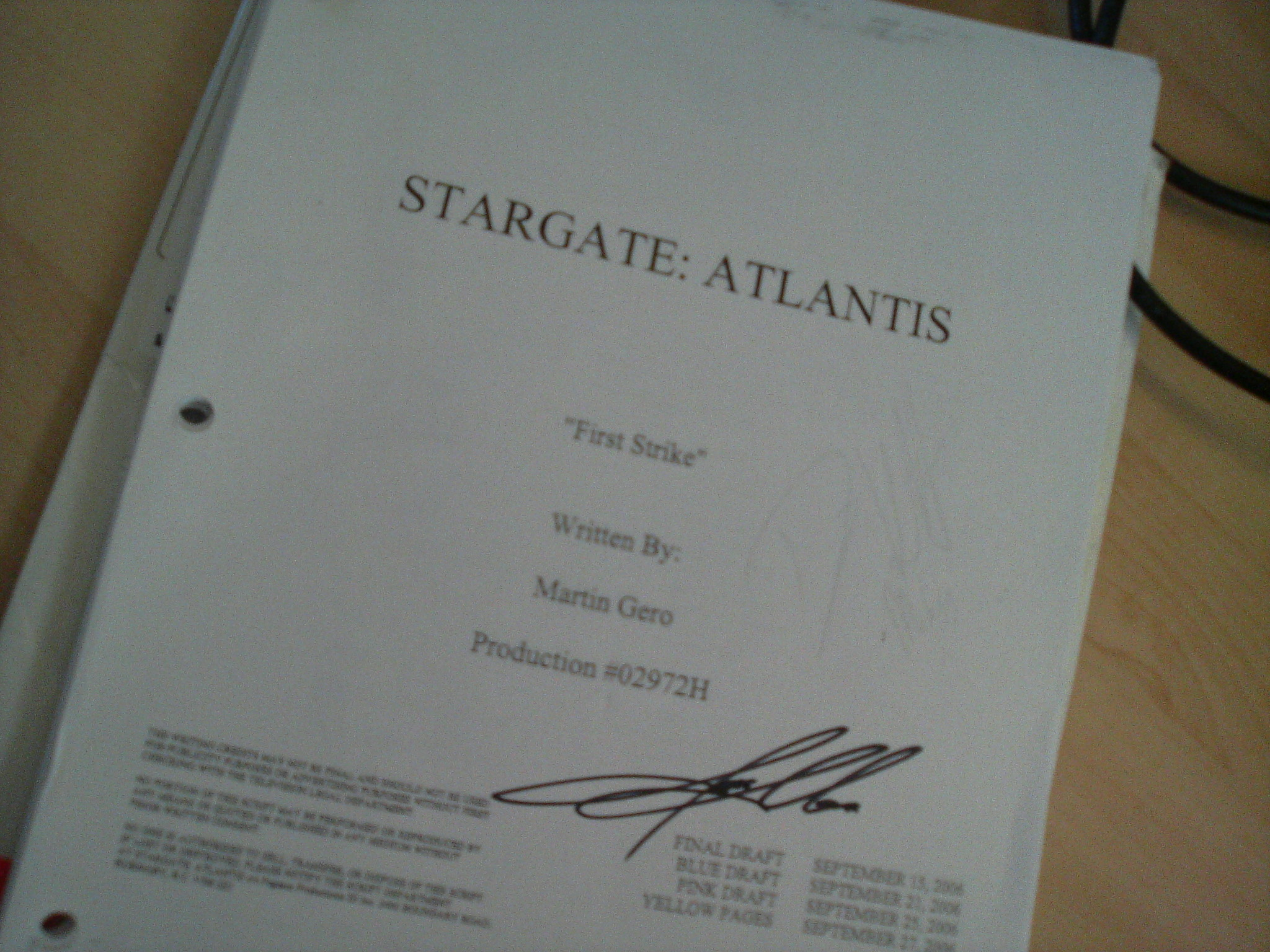
The script for "First Strike".

"First Strike" first surfaced in September 2006. It was conceived after the completion of the mid-season two-parter, "The Return", where writer Martin Gero wanted Atlantis leave the planet, but didn't know how and why it would happen until the episode was written. Gero also wanted Atlantis damaged and drop out of hyperspace into deep space by the end, so the following episode "Adrift" would follow. The Stargate satellite was originally meant to be a moon-sized satellite sent to destroy Lantea, but was dropped in favour for the Stargate satellite to destroy Atlantis, since a previous episode "Echoes" involved the saving of Lantea, and Brad Wright deemed its proposed destruction inappropriate. The scene where Weir thought her leadership challenged was needed to be written, since there were several instances in past episodes where the military step in as leaders. The scene where Ronon Dex says he needs to learn more science was written to parallel Ronon's appearance in only a few scenes. Gero also wrote the Fantastic Four into the scene, where Sheppard compared Teyla Emmagan to the Invisible Woman, paralleling the lack of Teyla's appearance as well.

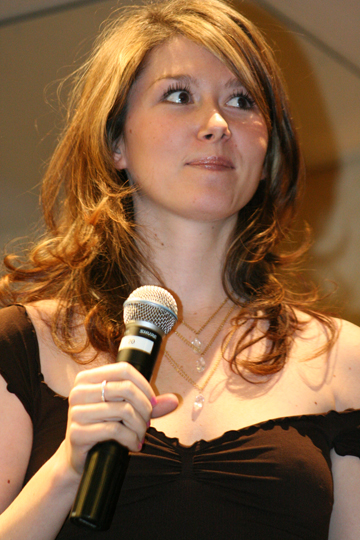
Jewel Staite was cast as Keller because the producers loved her performance as Ellia in season two's "Instinct".

"First Strike" introduced Jewel Staite as Jennifer Keller. Staite was originally cast because the producers loved her appearance as Ellia, a Wraith adolescent in season two episode "Instinct". Gero created the character to not take over Carson Beckett, but to fill in for him, and thought it endearing to have Keller uncomfortable in her new position. She was originally meant to be a Canadian character, but because fellow executive producer Paul Mullie thought there were already enough Canadian characters, she was turned into an American instead. The third season saw less of Mitch Pileggi as Colonel Caldwell, commander of the Daedalus, due to other commitments (including Day Break). The writers didn't want to kill him off, so they chose to introduce a new character instead, which was where the Apollo was introduced, as well as Abe Ellis, the ship's commander. Gero added a list of actors that would be suitable to play him. When Michael Beach was suggested, the crew decided to go with him. However, Beach wasn't familiar with the Stargate franchise, and was compelled to join the series by his mother, who was a fan. David Ogden Stiers again guest starred as Oberoth. Stiers actually drove from Los Angeles to Vancouver, though he was only wanted for one scene. A retired Colonel of the United States Air Force and his wife made cameo appearances.

=== Filming ===
The episode was filmed during the end of September/ beginning of October, 2006. One of the first scenes, where Keller talks to Weir was done on one long take. In the middle of the scene, the two entered an Atlantis transporter to another floor. The scene was filmed on the same floor, and during the time on the transporter, around 40 people quickly redecorated the hallway. The first scene Michael Beach appeared in was the conference at the beginning of the episode. Despite his lack of knowledge to the series, Beach still acted the scene in one take, where the writers were convinced at his acting style. Beach also asked several questions about the direction and characteristics of his character. Martin Wood noted that he asked "all the right questions." The scene showing McKay and Zelenka below the horizon was filmed from above by Brad Wright's request, though Gero and Wood wanted the scene shot horizontally. The one scene featuring Stiers as Oberoth was the conversation between him and Weir, which was filmed on the same large room, only Stiers and Torri Higginson had their back to each other around five to ten feet apart.

Three camera angles were used during Lorne's scene in the F-302. To save costs, one of the camera angles was operated by Kavan Smith himself, who held it on his lap. Elsewhere, the producers wanted to make the control chair rotate as Sheppard flies the city to make it different than any other actions involving the control chair. A stunt towards the end of the episode was used where Weir gets thrown after the beam grazes the tower. The stunt was not originally approved by the producers. A stuntwoman doubled Higginson as Weir during the sequence. The scene was rehearsed several times before filming the actual sequence. During the actual sequence, the stuntwoman wore a plastic mask to prevent the flying glass from injuring her face.

=== Visual effects ===
The episode's visual effects were produced by Rainmaker Digital Effects. Gero wrote the scene involving the minute long sequence where the Horizon weapon fires from the Apollo to the Asuran homeworld. He made contact with Mark Savela to see if it could be done; Savela was up to the challenge. The sequence was costly, since the visual effects team had to make a 3D world that would last a minute long to ensure that the sequence followed Gero's script. The sequences where Atlantis takes off from the bottom of the ocean were stock footage from "Rising", with the shield and beam added on. Another reason to keep the scenes was because the writers liked the scene to be reused. Another visual effect was used to switch Keller's flag patch from Canadian to American, since the decision to have Keller an American character was made after filming.

== Reception ==
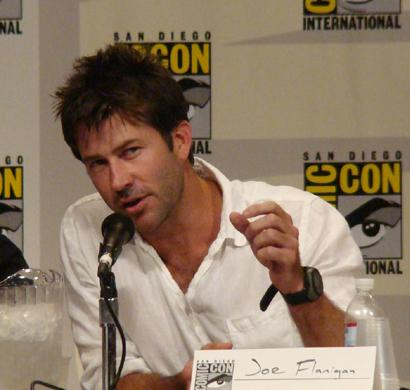
Joe Flanigan hinted that the episode would start a new direction for the series.

"First Strike" earned a household rating of 1.5, representing just below 2 million viewers; 1.1 million from the 25-54 demographic, and 986,000 from the 18-49 demographic. It was the strongest rating for the series since the 1.6 rating from "The Return, Part 1". This placed Stargate Atlantis the Sci Fi Channel's second most viewed series, losing only to Stargate SG-1's final episode "Unending", which achieved a household rating of 1.7, representing 2.2 million viewers; and was placed fifth for Cable television for the day it aired. "First Strike" was also given a syndication rating of 0.6. It also received a fan rating of 9.29 out of 10, and a GateWorld rating of 3 out of 4 stars. The episode was considered the biggest the producers have done for series at the time. According to Joe Flanigan (John Sheppard), the episode would start a new direction for Atlantis.

Jason Van Horn of IGN rated the episode an "impressive" 8.2 out of a possible 10, where the episode was praised for its visual effects and tension after the cliffhanger, which he thought would make the wait for its conclusion in the fourth season "even harder to handle," though surprised to see Beckett's replacement, Jennifer Keller introduced in this episode, which in Horn's thought would please the fans of Firefly. Critical Myth rated the episode 9 out of 10. It was noted for Weir's struggle to maintain her leadership, which was covered earlier in the series since the introduction of Colonel Caldwell, though the topic should have been covered earlier in the season. Ian Calcutt of HDTV UK noted the although the episode had many parallels with the SG-1 finale, "First Strike" made a "cracking" finale for the third season of Stargate Atlantis. Brett Love of TV Squad considered the episode a classic season finale, and liked the introductions of Keller and Ellis to the storyline, as well as stating the return of the Asurans as a welcoming one. Brigit Cherry of Total Sci-Fi rated the episode 9/10, commented that though the premise seems simple, the plot was fast-moving and efficient, and appreciated the episode's visual effects, stating that Atlantis is an "exceptionally strong Stargate brand in its own right."
