= Elizabeth Weir (Stargate) =

Character from the television series Stargate Atlantis

- Torri Higginson as Elizabeth Weir
- First appearance: "Lost City, Part 1" (SG-1)
- Last appearance: "Ghost in the Machine" (Atlantis)
- Created by: Brad Wright; Robert C. Cooper
- Portrayed by: Jessica Steen (SG-1 7.21–7.22); Torri Higginson; Michelle Morgan (Human-Asuran hybrid); Holly Dignard (stand-in for "Old Weir" in "Before I Sleep")

In-universe information
- Species: Human, later a Human-Asuran hybrid
- Occupation: Diplomat, Commander of the Atlantis Expedition
- Family: Mom, Simon (ex-fiancé)
- Nationality: American

Dr. Elizabeth Weir is a fictional character in the Canadian-American Sci-Fi Channel television series Stargate Atlantis, a military science fiction show about a military team exploring another galaxy via a network of alien transportation devices. Elizabeth Weir is introduced as a recurring character in the Stargate SG-1 season seven two-parter, Lost City. She does not hold any military rank since she is a civilian. Weir is the leader of the Atlantis expedition in Stargate Atlantis until the last episode of season three, titled "First Strike".

The character was primarily played by Torri Higginson, although when introduced in the Stargate SG-1 two-parter Lost City, she was played by Jessica Steen. In the season 5 Atlantis episode "Ghost in the Machine", the consciousness of Elizabeth Weir, having been transferred to sub-space by a group of Replicators hoping to ascend, was transferred to a Replicator template and portrayed by Michelle Morgan.

== Role in Stargate ==
=== Character arc in Stargate SG-1 ===
Dr. Elizabeth Weir first appears in the episode Lost City and was portrayed by Jessica Steen. She was put in command of Stargate Command (SGC) by President Henry Hayes, replacing Major General George Hammond to put a "civilian" face on the organization. Vice-President Kinsey wanted to use Weir as a civilian "puppet" to achieve his goals to gain control of the Stargate program. Dr. Weir, however, proved to be an ideal choice, quickly learning not to trust Kinsey and to put her faith in SG-1.

She was in charge of Stargate Command during Anubis' attack on Earth and suggested deploying Prometheus (under the command of her predecessor, Gen. George Hammond) and the Allied powers' combined air forces to Antarctica, in order to defend the newly discovered Ancient outpost. Earth repelled the attack, thanks to weapons deployed from the Ancient Chair in the outpost. Dr. Weir remained the Chief of Stargate Command during the fallout from the battle and impressed her senior staff when she successfully bluffed Earth's position during tense negotiations with a delegation of System Lords. Not long afterwards, Dr. Weir accepted reassignment to the Antarctic Research Outpost and its international staff, which she felt was better suited to her skill set. She took particular delight in informing Jack O'Neill of his appointment as her successor and his accompanying promotion to Brigadier General. O'Neill remained in command of the SGC for the remainder of the eighth season.

=== Character arc in Stargate Atlantis ===
Some time after Dr. Weir was sent to lead the research envoy studying the Ancient defense facility that had been discovered in Antarctica, Daniel Jackson realized that the lost city of Atlantis was located in the Pegasus Galaxy. Dr. Weir was placed in command of the multinational expedition that was sent through the Stargate to explore Atlantis. As a diplomat, Weir sought treaties with the human populated worlds in Pegasus, one of them being the Athosians. There was often tension between her and the leader of the Athosians and the latter eventually left the city to live on the mainland of the planet where Atlantis was hidden.

Weir approved several projects throughout Atlantis in season two including the Wraith retro-virus that she later gave as part of a treaty to a sect of Wraith looking to replace the human food source with Wraith infected by the virus. The retro-virus suppressed the Wraith genetic material in the DNA of a Wraith, leaving only the human DNA. Weir became infected with the consciousness of an alien soldier named Phoebus that was at war with another consciousness called Thalan who also took over John Sheppard. Both rampaged through the city, triggering a hostage situation which was caused by the aliens' desire to defeat one another for good. After nearly 24 hours, the rogue consciousnesses were subsequently expelled, resulting in both Sheppard and Weir returning to normal once again.

In season 3, Weir's leadership abilities were questioned by the International Oversight Advisory (IOA) Committee after two Wraith hive ships attempted to attack Earth. Although she managed to stop both hive ships, the IOA was divided over whether she should be allowed to remain leader of Atlantis and it was only with some help from Richard Woolsey that she was able to keep her position. She also unsuccessfully tried to negotiate an alliance with the Asurans and was infected with Asuran nanites. They later tried to assimilate her body and she very nearly didn't survive. In the final episode of season 3 ("First Strike") Weir was critically injured by the Asuran Satellite Weapon, leaving the city without a leader and adrift in space.

The season 4 premiere episode "Adrift" revealed that Weir had suffered massive injuries. She was later healed by the Asurans Replicator nanites that were left dormant in her body from when she was infected by Niam. As a result of this treatment, she became part-Replicator, part-Asuran. She took part in a mission to save Atlantis by stealing a Zero Point Module (ZPM) from the Asurans and sacrificed herself to allow the team to escape. Before that, however, she was able to control Oberoth and the collective for a short time. She ordered Col. Sheppard to leave her behind and escape. She was left on Asuras and it was later stated that she was killed by the Asurans shortly afterward. Showrunner Joseph Mallozzi mentioned the possibility that a Replicator lied to or misinformed the Atlantis team when she said that Weir was killed.

An organic copy of Weir, possessing all of her memories and personality, was created by the Replicators, along with similar copies of Sheppard, Ronon Dex, Teyla Emmagan and Rodney McKay. This clone of Weir is believed to have been killed by a contingent of Asurans when she sacrificed herself to allow the original Sheppard, Ronon, Teyla and McKay to escape. At the end of "Be All My Sins Remember'd", Weir was seen as the commander of an Aurora class ship with what appeared to be a rogue faction of Asurans. After the replicator planet was destroyed, she said, "now we can finally get to work without having to look over our shoulders". Her last appearance is in the episode "Ghost in the Machine", in which she is portrayed by Michelle Morgan. Here, she and her faction of Replicators had found a way to "digitally ascend" by downloading their consciousnesses into subspace. They planned to ascend from there, only to fail miserably. Once they determined that they needed organic bodies to ascend, they sought out technology that would allow them to regain solid form. But when they couldn't find the technology they needed, Elizabeth infiltrated the Atlantis system. She downloaded herself into a F.R.A.N. body and the rest of her faction followed suit. Once Elizabeth convinced Col. Sheppard and Mr. Woolsey that they would not be a threat to Atlantis, they proceeded to work on creating organic bodies into which they could download themselves. However, one member of the Replicators believed that he could ascend from a Replicator body and with eons of time he thought he would eventually succeed. The Replicator wreaked havoc on Atlantis in order to escape, but Elizabeth deactivated him before anyone could be hurt. Deciding that the incident proved they could no longer be trusted, she lured the remainder of her faction through a space gate to prevent it from happening again. The episode ends with Elizabeth closing her eyes and drifting through space.

== Literature ==
Weir later reappears in the official continuation series Stargate Atlantis Legacy where it is revealed that an Ascended Asgard named Ran helped her ascend for real. When McKay is transformed into a Wraith, Weir appears to her old friend in his dreams in an attempt to help McKay remember who he really is. After Weir saves McKay's life, she is forcibly de-ascended as Doctor Daniel Jackson once was and is found by the team, human once more. Weir aids the team in dealing with the Vanir - a rogue faction of Asgard - and returns to Atlantis until she is confirmed to be human once more. However, she indicates that she will not stay once she is cleared. Weir later helps Sheppard deal with a crisis involving the Genii and the squid-like aliens that inhabit Atlantis' new home planet, although she struggles with no longer being in charge and having to follow Sheppard's orders in a role reversal as Sheppard has become the current leader of the expedition.

== Casting history ==
=== Jessica Steen ===
Jessica Steen, who had been contractually cast only for the two episodes of Lost City was personally told by producers to not take any work that would interfere with a weekly recording schedule, and that Weir was going to be a central role in the yet to be greenlit Stargate: Atlantis. Reflecting on her time on Stargate Steen said that “I think I actually drove the writers/producers bananas — to a not good degree,” stating she was a stickler for details and did a bunch of background research and started asking hyper-specific and technical questions about the science aspects of the show that producers didn't know the answer to. This was combined with Steen deciding not to watch any prior episodes of Stargate or the movie, to be a more realistic "fish out of water."

During her time filming Lost City Steen also was actively involved in planning and packing for Burning Man which she considered "my family" saying she "missed weddings, [baby] showers, bar mitzvahs, everything" for Burning Man, comparing it to her personal Mecca. At the time Burning Man still had a stigma so her agent told her to tell the producers of Stargate that she had a family reunion she couldn't miss, which was technically correct, but she was skipping the reunion to go to Burning Man. After a few months she was told that she had been released from her contract to play Weir, with her agent saying "They felt [that] you were more committed to naked drugging in the desert than you would be committed to doing the show the way they needed you to." News of this being the reason wouldn't break until Steen opened up about it in 2021, as such, Stargate fans speculated elaborately about the cause, with the most popular theory being that she did not want to move to Vancouver where Stargate was filmed, which she personally dismissed saying she actually has family near Vancouver and a move would have been convenient.

=== Torri Higginson ===
Higginson was written out of the series in part to allow Samantha Carter (Amanda Tapping) to take over as leader of Atlantis. Towards the beginning of February 2008, it was revealed that Torri Higginson would not be reprising the role of Elizabeth Weir in season 5. Due to Higginson's absence, actress Michelle Morgan was brought in to replace her in the episode "Ghost in the Machine".

=== Michelle Morgan ===
After Higginson stepped away Michelle Morgan was brought in to replace her.
