= Chuck Campbell =

Canadian actor and comedian

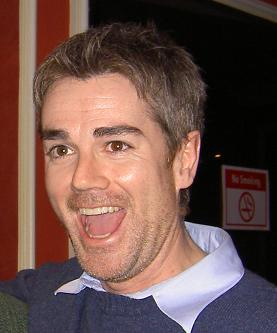
- Campbell at Wolf Pegasus Two, 2007
- Born: 5 August 1969 (age 57); Halifax, Nova Scotia, Canada
- Website: http://chuckcampbellonline.com

Charles Campbell (born 5 August 1969) is a Canadian actor who portrayed the role of Chuck the Technician on Stargate Atlantis.

== Early life ==
Campbell was born in Halifax, Nova Scotia. He got a BA in Theatre at Dalhousie University. He now resides in Vancouver, British Columbia.

== Career ==
Campbell started his career in acting working with theatre troupes touring the US and Canada. He later moved to Toronto to start work in film and television, and also did a lot of radio and voice acting

=== Stargate Atlantis ===
Campbell was hired as a stand in for Joe Flanigan for Stargate Atlantis:"Rising" but was actually used as the stand-in for David Hewlett, and continued to be his stand-in until the show ended. He was given an acting role in the Season 1 episode "The Brotherhood" by Martin Wood and appeared in over thirty episodes.

For three seasons, Campbell's character did not have a name, and he was always credited as "the technician". In "First Strike", Weir refers to Campbell's character as Chuck. Speaking at the Pegasus 2 convention in the UK, Campbell stated that he thought this was a mistake on Torri Higginson's part, but Martin Wood decided to keep the scene. The character continued to be called Chuck on-screen, but is given no surname. On the DVD commentary tracks, he has been referred to, jokingly, as "Chucknician", an amalgam of Chuck and technician.

=== Other roles ===
Campbell played Tsunaron in the Jason film Jason X. This last installment was made with a more tongue-in-cheek feel than the others, which was one of the factors which made Chuck consider the role. In an online interview, Chuck was asked the question: 'Why do you think the Friday the 13th movies have been a bigger hit than other thrillers featuring serial killers?'

His response: "Interesting question! I think it might be the car accident syndrome, where sometimes you don't WANT to look, but you always end up turning your head to see what happens. They are so unrealistic and usually quite graphic with their violence, that it becomes almost silly, and you start to laugh and wonder how is the next person going to die. Maybe everybody just likes a really good villain, and I think Jason is probably in the top five."

Campbell once played Benvolio in a production of Romeo and Juliet which starred a fellow Stargate Atlantis cast member Claire Rankin as Juliet.

== Filmography ==
=== Film ===
Year	Title	Role	Notes
1994	In the Mouth of Madness	Customer	
1997	My Dog Vincent	O'Brien Higgins	
1999	Superstar	Owen	
2000	Blood: The Last Vampire	Interrogator	(voice)
2000	Urban Legends: Final Cut	Plane Geek	
2001	Angel Eyes	Young Man	
2001	Phase IV	Nathan	
2001	Jason X	Tsunaron Peyton	
2013	Crystal Lake Memories: The Complete History of Friday the 13th	Himself	Documentary film

=== Television ===
Year	Title	Role	Notes
1993	Class of 96	Gamps	Episode: "They Shoot Baskets, Don't They?"
1993	Road to Avonlea	Calvin Murphy	Episode: "Moving On"
1993	Are You Afraid of the Dark?	Keith	Episode: "The Tale of the Dark Dragon"
1998	Dumb Bunnies	Head Guard (voice)	Episode: "The Prince of Monte Carrot"
1999	Genius	Hugo Peplo	Television film
1999	Strange Justice	Johnny	Television film
2000–2001	Earth: Final Conflict	Paramedic	2 episodes
2000	Possessed	G.I.	Television film
2000–2002	Pelswick	Boyd Scullarzo (voice)	26 episodes
2000	The Last Debate	Bartender	Television film
2001	Twice in a Lifetime	Dan	Episode: "Final Flight"
2002	Just Cause	Record Executive	Episode: "Fading Star"
2005–2009	Stargate Atlantis	Chuck	45 episodes
2006	Stargate SG-1	Chuck	Episode: "The Pegasus Project"
2007	Sanctuary	Two-Faced Guy	Webseries
2007	Painkiller Jane	Exhibitor	Episode: "Higher Court"
2007	Anna's Storm	DJ Dan	Television movie
2008–2011	Sanctuary	Two-Faced Guy	6 episodes
2009	His Name Was Jason: 30 Years of Friday the 13th	Himself	Documentary film
2013	Deadly Descent: The Abominable Snowman	Brian Tanner	Television film
2013	Goodnight for Justice: Queen of Hearts	Farmer	Television film
2015	Real Murders: An Aurora Teagarden Mystery	Reporter	Television film

=== Video games ===
Year	Title	Role	Notes
1992	Guardians of the 'Hood	Boris	
1999	The Misadventures of Tron Bonne	Bon Bonne	English version
1999	Sled Storm	Niklas Ericksson	
