= Stargate Atlantis season 3 =

Stargate Atlantis
- Season 3
- DVD cover
- No. of episodes: 20

Release
- Original network: Sci Fi Channel
- Original release: July 14, 2006 – February 5, 2007

Season chronology
- ← Previous; Season 2 Next → Season 4

The third season of Stargate Atlantis, an American-Canadian television series, began airing on July 21, 2006 on the American Sci Fi Channel. The third season concluded after 20 episodes on February 5, 2007 on the Canadian The Movie Network. The series was developed by Brad Wright and Robert C. Cooper, who also served as executive producers. Season three regular cast members include Joe Flanigan, Torri Higginson, Rachel Luttrell, Jason Momoa, with Paul McGillion, and David Hewlett as Dr. Rodney McKay.

== Cast ==
- Starring Joe Flanigan as Lt. Colonel John Sheppard
- Torri Higginson as Dr. Elizabeth Weir
- Rachel Luttrell as Teyla Emmagan
- Jason Momoa as Ronon Dex
- With Paul McGillion as Dr. Carson Beckett
- And David Hewlett as Dr. Rodney McKay

== Episodes ==
Episodes in bold are continuous episodes, where the story spans over 2 or more episodes.

No. overall	No. in season	Title	Directed by	Written by	Original release date
41	1	"**No Man's Land**"	Martin Wood	Martin Gero	July 14, 2006
After betraying the expedition, the Wraith head to Earth with McKay and Ronon. Meanwhile, Elizabeth must answer to the IOA for her decisions during the short-lived alliance, and Sheppard must stop the hive ships from reaching Earth, whatever the cost.
42	2	"**Misbegotten**"	Martin Wood	Joseph Mallozzi & Paul Mullie	July 21, 2006
After using the retro-virus to turn an entire hive into humans, a Stargate-less colony is created for them to live in until a more permanent solution can be found. All the while, Richard Woolsey, newly arrived at Atlantis, observes Dr. Weir to determine whether she is fit to continue to lead the expedition.
43	3	"Irresistible"	Martin Wood	Story by : Brad Wright & Robert C. Cooper; Teleplay by : Carl Binder	July 28, 2006
The Atlantis team encounters a village that adores a man named Lucius Lavin to the point of insanity. He claims to have medicines to offer the team, but when Beckett investigates, he brings the man back to Atlantis smitten by the man's charm. Soon, the entire expedition falls under his spell.
44	4	"Sateda"	Robert C. Cooper	Robert C. Cooper	August 4, 2006
When Ronon becomes a prisoner offworld, his captors hand him over to the Wraith, who take him to his homeworld. There, he is once again forced to become their prey, but witness to his capture, Sheppard's team races to Sateda to return him to his new home.
45	5	"**Progeny**"	Andy Mikita	Story by : Robert C. Cooper & Carl Binder; Teleplay by : Carl Binder	August 11, 2006
Weir and the team visit M7R-227, a planet where an advanced civilization lives who split off from the Lanteans thousands of years ago, and have built an entire planet out of Ancient technology. But after their adverse behavior, it is soon discovered that they might not be Lantean, or even organic for that matter.
46	6	"**The Real World**"	Paul Ziller	Carl Binder	August 18, 2006
Dr. Weir awakens in a sanitarium outside of D.C. only to find that Atlantis, and the Stargate Program, was a fantasy. But after a series of nightmarish visions, she doesn't take long to realize things aren't what they appear to be and is determined to return to the city.
47	7	"Common Ground"	William Waring	Ken Cuperus	August 25, 2006
Sheppard is captured by Kolya, who plans to trade him for Ladon Radim. To help persuade Dr. Weir, he uses his captured Wraith to feed off Sheppard over and over again. To escape, Sheppard must find common ground with the only one who wants to achieve the same goal.
48	8	"McKay and Mrs. Miller"	Martin Wood	Martin Gero	September 8, 2006
On Earth, a young housewife has written a ground-breaking proof that could benefit Atlantis. She is McKay's sister who has given up a career as a scientist to raise a family, and when he persuades her to come to Atlantis, another Rodney comes from an alternate reality.
49	9	"Phantoms"	Martin Wood	Carl Binder	September 15, 2006
Trying to locate a missing team, Sheppard's team finds a Wraith hallucinatory device on M1B-129, and after a few hours of research, McKay deems it to be a threat for everyone's safety. Yet, while attempting to leave, the DHD explodes, leaving them to become victim to the device.
50	10	"**The Return**"	Brad Turner	Martin Gero	September 22, 2006
51	11	"**The Return**"	Brad Turner	Martin Gero	April 13, 2007
Part 1: During the first test of the intergalactic bridge, the Daedalus discovers an Ancient Warship flying between the two galaxies. They rescue the nearly 100 Ancients on-board, who then order the expedition to vacate Atlantis. A few weeks later, Asurans take over the city and kill the Ancients. Part 2: A visiting O'Neill and Woolsey are captured in the crossfire, forcing Weir and the team to disobey orders and return to the Pegasus Galaxy. Reuniting with Teyla and Ronon, they reclaim Atlantis before the Daedalus arrives to destroy the Asurans, and Atlantis, with nuclear bombs.
52	12	"Echoes"	William Waring	Story by : Carl Binder & Brad Wright; Teleplay by : Carl Binder	April 20, 2007
Everyone starts to see ghosts of Lanteans, caused by echoes being emitted by whale-like creatures converging on the city from the planet's ocean. When side effects begin to occur, McKay discovers that the Ancients tried to teach the whales their language, and that the whales are trying to warn them about a natural disaster that endangers all life on the planet.
53	13	"Irresponsible"	Martin Wood	Joseph Mallozzi & Paul Mullie	April 27, 2007
Lucius Lavin is up to his old tricks again. He's using an Ancient Personal Shield Emitter to pose as an invincible hero, but needs the team's help when Acastus Kolya shows up to deal with Lavin personally.
54	14	"Tao of Rodney"	Martin Wood	Damian Kindler	May 4, 2007
After an Ancient device within the city alters Rodney's DNA, he gains superhuman powers. Although he initially takes them as a blessing, his enhanced brilliance is checked only by his impending death, unless he learns to overcome his ego to ascend.
55	15	"The Game"	William Waring	Story by : Don Whitehead & Holly Henderson; Teleplay by : Carl Binder	May 11, 2007
Major Lorne's team discovers a planet that fits the description of what Sheppard and McKay mistook as a video game they found in the Atlantis database. It turns out that, through a series of Ancient satellites above planet M4D-058, the game has been controlling real people, the People of Geldar and Hallona, who now stand on the brink of war and destruction.
56	16	"The Ark"	Martin Wood	Story by : Scott Nimerfro & Ken Cuperus; Teleplay by : Ken Cuperus	May 18, 2007
Colonel Sheppard's team discovers a space station where the last of a race of humans remain. They soon discover, however, the entire population is in danger when the station is damaged through the suicide of a recently awoken resident.
57	17	"Sunday"	William Waring	Martin Gero	June 1, 2007
The expedition tries to relax during a mandatory day off until an unexpected explosion leaves three people dead and reveals that one other scientist is a walking time bomb. Unfortunately, the attempt to resolve the issue will result in the loss of an important face in Atlantis.
58	18	"Submersion"	Brenton Spencer	Ken Cuperus	June 8, 2007
The team discovers a drill platform at the bottom of the ocean which might be an alternative to ZPMs, but during their visit, they are ambushed by an old Wraith Queen. Once they capture her, Teyla's desire to get information could lead her down a dangerous path.
59	19	"Vengeance"	Andy Mikita	Carl Binder	June 15, 2007
Now that the Wraith see Michael as an "unclean thing," he has been experimenting with Iratus bugs, producing monsters for an army to rule the galaxy. When the team stumbles on one of his labs, they are in for a world of hurt when they are attacked by countless creatures, experiments that Michael himself can no longer control.
60	20	"**First Strike**"	Martin Wood	Martin Gero	June 22, 2007
After the Apollo arrives, they launch a pre-emptive strike against the Asurans when it is discovered that they are building a fleet of ships but later a weapons satellite appears above the city, firing a beam at Atlantis which leaves everyone trapped in the city and the Expedition unable to use their Stargate. Ronon, Rodney and Teyla are left injured and Elizabeth fights for her life when the beam strikes the Control Room. Atlantis is left floating helplessly in space due to the hyperdrive shutting down and has only 24 hours of power left before the shields fail and everyone dies.

== Production ==
- Richard Kind, who played Lucius Lavin in "Irresistible" and "Irresponsible", also played a minor role as Gary Meyers in the original Stargate film. He is the only actor to appear in both the film and Stargate: Atlantis.
- "Common Ground" introduces the "Todd" Wraith character that plays an important role in the later Seasons.
- "Sunday" marks the last to feature Paul McGillion as a regular cast member, although he is still in the opening titles for the rest of Season 3.
- "First Strike" introduces Jewel Staite as new Chief Medical Officer Dr. Jennifer Keller.

== DVD releases ==
DVD name	Region 1	Region 2	Region 4
Stargate Atlantis Season 3	September 18, 2007	January 14, 2008	September 26, 2007
Season 3: Volume 1	—	August 27, 2007	—
Season 3: Volume 2	—	September 24, 2007	—
Season 3: Volume 3	—	October 29, 2007	—
Season 3: Volume 4	—	November 26, 2007	—
Season 3: Volume 5	—	January 14, 2008	—

== Awards ==
"No Man's Land" won a Gemini Award for "Best Visual Effects". For "McKay and Mrs. Miller", writer Martin Gero was nominated for a Gemini Award in the category "Best Writing in a Dramatic Series".
