= Atlantis Expedition =

1984 Argentine raft journey across Atlantic Ocean

Emblem of Atlantis Expedition

Expedition Atlantis is the name given to the crossing of the Atlantic Ocean made by five Argentines in 1984, leaving from the port of Tenerife in the Canary Islands and 52 days later arriving in La Guaira, Venezuela.

The aim was to prove that 3500 years before Christopher Columbus, African sailors may have accidentally reached the shores of America led by specific ocean currents.

The boat was a raft 13.6 metres (45 ft) long by 5.8 metres (19 ft) wide, built out of logs, rudderless, and with only a single sail. The crew consisted of Alfredo Barragan, Jorge Iriberri, Horacio Giaccaglia, Daniel Sanchez Magariños and Felix Arrieta.

The departure date was May 22, 1984, and landfall was made 52 days later, on July 12, 1984. The distance traveled was approximately 3,200 nautical miles (5,900 km; 3,700 mi).

== See also ==
- Kon-Tiki expedition – 1947 raft journey from South America to Polynesia
- Pre-Columbian transoceanic contact theories
