= David Nykl =

Czech-Canadian actor (born 1967)

- Nykl in 2026
- Born: 7 February 1967 (age 59); Prague, Czechoslovakia (now Czech Republic)
- Occupation: actor
- Years active: 1988–present

David Nykl (born 7 February 1967) is a Czech-Canadian actor who has worked in film, television, commercials and theater. He is best known for portraying Dr. Radek Zelenka in the SyFy television series Stargate Atlantis and Anatoly Knyazev in the DC Comics series Arrow.

== Early life and education ==
Nykl was born in Prague, Czechoslovakia, to a nurse mother and a structural engineer father. After the Soviet invasion in 1968, he and his family left then-Communist Czechoslovakia for Canada. Upon arriving at Victoria, British Columbia, Nykl briefly attended the University of British Columbia, where he majored in liberal arts and marketing, but did not graduate.

== Career ==
Nykl has appeared frequently in Vancouver and Prague in dozens of theater, film and television productions. Known for his versatility and depth as an actor, he has also produced theatre and film projects, and in 1994, he co-founded Prague's Misery Loves Company Theatre with Richard Toth and Ewan McLaren.

Nykl is known to science fiction fans as the recurring Stargate Atlantis character of Dr. Radek Zelenka, a Czech scientist on Earth's expedition to the "lost city" of Atlantis. His character is often seen working with the main scientist Dr. Rodney McKay, with their disagreements recurring throughout the series. He also played the role in the Stargate SG-1 episode "The Pegasus Project".

Nykl is fluent in Czech, English, French and Spanish. Though his character on Stargate Atlantis speaks English with a Czech accent, Nykl normally speaks with a Canadian accent. Whenever Zelenka spoke Czech in Stargate Atlantis, Nykl was given the lines in English, and he translated them.

In 2012 he made a brief guest appearance on "Once Upon A Time" as dock man turned fish by evil Cora.

== Personal life ==
He has three children: daughters Judi and Maddie, and son Sam.

== Filmography ==
Actor
Year	Title	Media	Role	Notes
1988	Danger Bay	TV series	Peter	
1993	Strangeview	Feature	Trucker's Friend	
1993	David	Feature	Bob	
1995	Sacred Cargo	Feature	Brother Alexis	
1996	Hidden in Silence	TV movie	Henek	
1996	5 Stunden Angst – Geiselnahme im Kindergarten	Feature	"Drops"	
1996	Crackerjack 2	Feature	Cavanaugh	
1997	Snow White: A Tale of Terror	Feature	Unknown	
1998	Prague Duet	Feature	The Journalist	
1998	The Barber of Siberia	Feature	Unknown	
1998	Operation Noah	TV movie	PR Man	
1998	Act of War	Feature	George Willmont	
1998	Česká soda	Feature	Unknown	
1998	Blumenstein Fernand – bláznův příběh	Feature	voice	
1998	Hell Mountain	Feature	First Corridor Guard	
1998	Escape Velocity	Feature	Father Russell	
1998	Pat & Mat	TV series	Pat	1 episode – "Playing Cards"
1999	Loves Lies Bleeding	Feature	Fraser	
1999	Joan of Arc	TV series	Duke of Luxembourg	
1999	Praha očima − Prague Stories	Feature	Honza	
2000	Jack London's Call of the Wild	TV series	Settler	
2000	The Scarlet Pimpernel	TV series	Robespierre's Barber	
2001	Béčka	Feature	Unknown	
2001	Seven Days	TV series	Yuri	
2002	The Dead Zone	TV series	The Waiter	
2002	My Guide to Becoming a Rock Star	TV series	Dancing Potato	
2003	Jake 2.0	TV series	Vasily	
2003	Stealing Sinatra	TV movie	The Valet	
2004	Spare Change	Short film	Joel	
2004–2009	Stargate: Atlantis	TV series	Dr. Radek Zelenka	recurring, 55 episodes
2005	Masters of Horror	TV series	CSI	
2005	Pterodactyl	Feature film	Herbert	
2005	Behind the Camera: Mork & Mindy	TV movie	John Byner	
2005	Cold Squad	TV series	Bernhardt	
2006	Psych	TV series	Events Coordinator in "Shawn vs. the Red Phantom"	
2006	Stargate SG-1	TV series	Dr. Radek Zelenka	1 episode – "The Pegasus Project"
2006	Merlin's Apprentice	TV series	Brianna's Father	
2007	Eureka	TV series	Dr. Steven Whiticus	
2008	Sanctuary	TV series	Strickland	
2008	The Beast of Bottomless Lake	Feature	Unknown	
2008	The Seamstress	Feature film	Donny Platt	
2009	Encounter with Danger	TV movie	Elliott Maine	
2009	Helen	TV series	John	
2010	Fringe	TV series	Reverend Marcus	
2010	Human Target	TV series	Vincent Morgan	
2012	Christmas Miracle	Film	Drake	
2012	Camera Shy	Film	Cliff Gardner	
2013	Once Upon A Time	TV series	Man on dock	1 episode – "The Cricket Game"
2013–2020	Arrow	TV series	Anatoli Knyazev	recurring
2014	Supernatural	TV series	Lester Morris	
2015	Air	Film	Sleeper 1	
2018	Salvation	TV series	Czech Rep	1 episode – "Détente"
2019	Superior Donuts	Play	Arthur	
2019	The Sleepers (Bez vědomí)	TV series	Gerald Lloyd	
2025	Resident Alien	TV series	Gary	Episode: "Soul Providers"
