= Rodney McKay =

- David Hewlett as Rodney McKay
- First appearance: "48 Hours" (SG-1)
- Last appearance: "Seizure" (Stargate Universe)
- Created by: Robert C. Cooper
- Portrayed by: David Hewlett

In-universe information
- Species: Human
- Gender: Male
- Title(s): Head of the Science and Research Division of the Atlantis Expedition
- Occupation: Astrophysicist
- Relatives: Jeannie Miller (sister); Caleb Miller (brother-in-law); Madison Miller (niece)
- Nationality: Canadian

Meredith Rodney McKay, Ph.D., is a fictional character in the 2004 Canadian-American Sci-Fi Channel television series Stargate SG-1 and Stargate Atlantis, two military science fiction television shows about military teams exploring two galaxies (Milky Way and Pegasus) via a network of alien transportation devices.

Played by British-born Canadian actor David Hewlett, McKay was a main character in all five seasons of Stargate Atlantis (2004–2009). Earlier he held a recurring role in Stargate SG-1 for four seasons (2002, 2004, 2006, 2007). In 2011, McKay was featured in an episode of Stargate Universe.

Doctor Rodney McKay is a contractor for the United States Air Force and makes his first appearance in the Stargate SG-1 episode "48 Hours", the fourteenth episode of Stargate SG-1 Season 5, as a scientist who joins the fictional Stargate Program. McKay was seen in two more episodes of Stargate SG-1 before becoming a main character in Stargate Atlantis which was set in the Pegasus Galaxy. His next appearances in Stargate SG-1 were in Alternate timeline and different realities until the crossover episode "The Pegasus Project" in season ten. Overall, McKay and Joe Flanigan's character John Sheppard are the only two characters who appeared in every episode of Stargate Atlantis, with McKay being the character with the most screentime.

== Role in Stargate ==
=== Character biography ===
Meredith Rodney McKay was born in 1968. He has a sister named Jeannie Miller (played by David Hewlett's sister Kate Hewlett), who is similar in intellect. McKay feels that his parents blamed him for their problems. McKay originally turned to science after his piano teacher told him he was a "fine clinical player" but had no sense of the art. During his youth, McKay joined a Scouting Troop, Lodge 14 of the Fort McMurray Eager Beavers. He built an atomic bomb for his grade six science fair exhibit, prompting a visit from the Central Intelligence Agency. Among his four diplomas, McKay implied he has degrees in physics and mechanical engineering, and stated he actually has two Ph.D.s. He also revealed he has extensive education in astrophysics.

Prior to his first appearance in Stargate SG-1, McKay was stationed at the Area 51 facility where he became one of the premier experts on the Stargate network outside of Stargate Command. In "48 Hours", he is assigned to help Major Carter recover Teal'c from being trapped in the Stargate, but McKay's theories are proven wrong. He is subsequently reassigned to Russia where he oversees the transfer and development of the naqahdah generator technology. McKay is again assigned to help the SGC in "Redemption" when Anubis tries to overload the SGC's Stargate with a harmonic energy pulse. McKay later makes a sincere apology to Carter for being wrong.

With the discovery of Atlantis' location in the Pegasus Galaxy, McKay is assigned to Dr. Elizabeth Weir's expedition to Atlantis, serving as chief scientific adviser. He leaves his apartment and a cat on Earth, and becomes the expedition's leading expert on the Ancients, and is assigned to an exploration team consisting of Major John Sheppard, Teyla Emmagan and Lieutenant Aiden Ford. Born without the ATA gene, McKay volunteers to be the first human subject for Dr. Beckett's gene therapy and becomes the carrier of an artificial ATA gene of his own.

When the Atlantis expedition is trying to send a message to Earth, McKay records, in his message, a wish that he might get along better with his sister.

McKay loses Sheppard's trust in "Trinity" after he refuses to listen to Dr. Radek Zelenka and assures both Weir and Sheppard that he can make a piece of Ancient technology ("Project Arcturus") work on an alien planet, but the device explodes and destroys 5/6ths of the surrounding star system. Sheppard tells McKay that it might take a while to earn his trust back, but that he was sure Rodney could do it if he really wanted to. In the episode "The Long Goodbye" McKay claims that he is in charge should both Weir and Sheppard be unavailable or incapacitated, but Col. Steven Caldwell takes command of Atlantis to Weir's later satisfaction.

Some months after the season 2 episode "Duet" where the mind of a female soldier - Lieutenant Laura Cadman - was trapped inside McKay's body, McKay starts a relationship with Katie Brown.

McKay's problems attempting to resurrect Project Arcturus cause him to seek the help of his sister, Jeannie Miller, a fellow scientist whose intelligence matches his—but who lacks the worst of his most aggravating personal qualities. Though there is obvious friction in their relationship, McKay manages to reconcile his differences with his sister.

When living Ancients reclaim Atlantis and ask the expedition to leave, McKay is reassigned to Area 51. Upon learning that the Asurans have taken Atlantis, McKay joins Sheppard's and Weir's team to retake the city.

During "Tao of Rodney", Rodney's genes are mutated by a device designed to aid with Ascension on the Ancients who were physiologically incapable of doing so. During this time, Rodney invents several equipment upgrades, writes several theories and books, including a biography of Dr. Weir, and optimizes the city's power grid, believing himself a dead man. After accepting that Ascension is his only hope of surviving, Rodney attempts to make amends to his colleagues and gives final gifts to several friends, including healing the massive scarring on Ronon's back. He is later returned to normal at the last minute.

McKay takes Dr. Beckett's death in "Sunday" quite badly. He assumes the duty of telling Beckett's mother that her son had died (the two are revealed to be, in fact, close friends) and subsequently serves as one of Beckett's pallbearers. A mourning McKay was comforted at the end of the episode by what appeared to be Beckett's spirit.

"Reunion" shows McKay deflated when the newly promoted Colonel Samantha Carter is announced as the new leader of Atlantis after Dr. Weir's condition worsened. McKay tells Carter of his relationship with Katie Brown and that he hopes that the old attraction between them will not get in the way of them working together. In the episode "Quarantine", McKay decides to propose marriage to Katie Brown, but a citywide lockdown traps him and Katie in the botany lab for several hours. McKay ultimately decides not to move forward with his marriage proposal, although Katie is left in the belief that he intended to propose. Katie and Rodney are no longer speaking in "Trio" because she interpreted his recent decision as a break-up and lack of interest, and she adds her name to a list to be transferred back to Earth. At the end of the episode, Dr. Keller asks Rodney out. In an alternate future in the season finale episode, "The Last Man", McKay loses Sheppard, Teyla, Ronon, and Carter, quits the Atlantis expedition team and becomes romantically involved with Dr. Keller. In the episode "The Shrine", Rodney suffers from a disease with symptoms similar to Alzheimer's disease and reveals in a video to Dr. Keller that he has loved her "for some time now". Later, in "Brain Storm", Dr. Keller finally confesses to Rodney their feelings were mutual.

McKay is last seen in the episode "Seizure", trying to dial Destiny, but is eventually unable to complete the task.

=== Personality ===
Dr. McKay is considered one of the most arrogant and condescending personalities found in the Stargate franchise. He once identified himself as a Mensa member and believes himself to be the smartest person in the city, as mentioned in a conversation between Drs. Weir and Carson in "Hide and Seek". What makes it worse for his fellow team members is that, while he does not possess the wisdom of many of the other characters, he excels in terms of raw intelligence. Despite his irritating demeanor, many members of the Atlantis expedition are on friendly terms with him, and McKay is able to keep steady relationships. An alternate version of himself, Rod McKay who is more relaxed and laid-back (also played by David Hewlett) admitted that he likes McKay for the simple fact that he is able to speak his mind so freely and simply. Expedition commander Dr. Elizabeth Weir states in "Tao of Rodney" that she and the members of Rodney's team love him. Although McKay enjoys deriding medicine as voodoo and fake science, he considered Dr. Carson Beckett to be "the closest thing to a best friend" he ever had. He is close to the people he works with, having referred to them as a surrogate family in a message to his sister Jeannie.

McKay is a hypochondriac, claiming at various times to suffer from hypoglycemia, restless leg syndrome, allergy to bee stings and citrus fruit, none of which have ever been confirmed. Ironically, when the team were exposed to a Wraith device that caused all but Teyla to suffer from paranoid hallucinations, McKay was relatively unaffected despite spending significant time next to the device in question. He enjoys veal, MREs, hospital food, and airline food. He studied medical science at one time, but stopped because too much information on the human body made him start diagnosing himself with many phantom diseases. McKay comes up with his most brilliant ideas while faced with the threat of death, to the point that, when Colonel Cameron Mitchell was working with McKay on an important assignment, Sheppard showed Mitchell a lemon, suggesting it would ensure McKay had the right incentive.

Despite his shortcomings, McKay has performed acts of genuine courage, overcoming his own fears to, for instance hand-carry, and then throw, a naquadah generator through the Stargate in order to lure a creature of floating energy out of the city (Although it should be said he was wearing an impenetrable personal force field at the time), or evacuate entire populations from planets about to be destroyed. In "The Defiant One", he is torn between staying with a dying man or going to help the outmatched Sheppard, with the other man observing McKay's personal growth for feeling like that and only ending when the other man shot himself so that McKay could help Sheppard without feeling guilty. He often provides comic relief in addition to his considerable technological expertise, and his ability to find solutions in situations of imminent death have been used against him several times to motivate him. His ability and habit of speaking quickly is used to great comedic effect many times in the series, particularly when explaining just how "screwed" they all are. His relationship with Dr. Keller is also used for comedic effect, as no one believes that they are dating, not even Colonel Sheppard.

McKay's character frequently makes references only a Canadian of his age would get. On one occasion he laments he hates ropes, that they are the reason he only got a silver ParticipACTION Badge. On another he offers to give a bewildered Sheppard the "Coles Notes" version of an explanation. It is not clear where in Canada he was raised, but references to Fort McMurray and West Edmonton Mall suggest northern Alberta.

McKay has a predilection for women with short blonde hair—particularly (or perhaps because of) Col. Samantha Carter. He named the people of Geldar after a blonde girl he once dated, and went so far as advising the women to wear their hair in a manner similar to Col. Carter's. In "Grace Under Pressure", a hallucination of Carter tells McKay the reason they could never have a relationship is because "you don't work with people, you don't trust them". By his own admission, he has always envied Carter's aptitude for creativity and for having a "sixth sense" when it comes to problem solving . He has called Carter "an artist", and although he considers himself smarter than Carter, he believes her to be wiser. McKay's biggest fear (as seen in "Childhood's End") is children. He also has a fear of being eaten by a whale after being read Moby Dick by his father in his childhood. He admitted one of his bad habits is "reacting in a certain way to certain doom".

== Mentions outside Stargate ==
Following from his appearance in "Brain Storm" along with Bill Nye and Neil deGrasse Tyson, Rodney McKay is later mentioned by Bill Nye in the episode "Let It Go" of the third season of Blindspot.

== Conceptual history ==
David Hewlett portrayed McKay in "48 Hours" and "Redemption" in the sister show Stargate SG-1. McKay's citrus allergy was the producers' in-joke about a SG-1 crew member who insisted he was violently allergic to citrus and thus refused going out to lunch with others, not knowing the local restaurant regularly served him salad containing citrus without anything happening. When the new Stargate Atlantis production crew came up with the casting, they originally created Dr. Benjamin Ingram, an African-Canadian scientist. Hewlett auditioned for the character, despite not being African-Canadian. It was decided that McKay would replace Ingram as a main character for the series. Hewlett was contacted and arrived at the set the day after filming for the Stargate Atlantis pilot episode had started.

Producer Joseph Mallozzi described McKay as "an insufferable ass [in "48 Hours"] who, over the course of the franchise's run, ended up redeeming himself in surprising fashion." According to Mallozzi, McKay "takes another giant step toward redemption [in "Redemption"] – a process that would be completed by the time he assumed a lead position in the Atlantis expedition" and that "He's snarky, smug, and annoying as hell but – damn – he is good at what he does. And what he does is use his smarts to save the day."
