= List of Stargate Atlantis episodes =

Stargate Atlantis is a science fiction television series created by Brad Wright and Robert C. Cooper as a spin off from its sister show, Stargate SG-1. The series resumes the story of the "Lost City" and "New Order" episodes of SG-1, where a military team led by Colonel (now Brigadier General) Jack O'Neill, Dr. Daniel Jackson, Major (now Lt. Colonel) Samantha Carter and the Shol'va Jaffa Teal'c, use an ancient alien artifact called the Stargate to travel to different planets to explore and find new technology. The series pilot "Rising" takes place in the year 2004 after the events of "Lost City" and "New Order", when they finally find the lost city of the Ancients.

Stargate Atlantis premiered on July 16, 2004 on the channel Sci Fi Channel. The Sci Fi Channel would air all the five seasons made for the series. Since the American broadcast splits each season to allow the production to catch up, the British and Canadian channels Sky One and The Movie Network aired the second part of some seasons before their American counterpart. Stargate Atlantis' finale episode premiered in the United States on the Sci Fi Channel on January 9, 2009. The series finale was also the series' 100th episode. All five seasons of Stargate Atlantis are available on DVD. A direct-to-DVD film tentatively titled Stargate: Extinction was planned, but was later shelved.

The cast of the first season consisted of Joe Flanigan starring as Maj. John Sheppard, David Hewlett as Dr. Rodney McKay, Rachel Luttrell as Teyla Emmagan, Torri Higginson as Elizabeth Weir and Rainbow Sun Francks as First Lt. Aiden Ford. Aiden Ford was reduced to recurring character in season two and was replaced by Jason Momoa as the extraterrestrial human Ronon Dex in episode three of season two. Francks continued to have a recurring role in season 2, until his character's death (although this was not confirmed). After Torri Higginson's departure as a main character from Stargate Atlantis after Season 3, she was replaced by Amanda Tapping's Carter from the sister show. Paul McGillion, Robert Picardo and Jewel Staite were also main characters. McGillion became a main character in season two until season three as Carson Beckett, Picardo replaced Tapping as a main character as the new leader of the Atlantis expedition as Richard Woolsey for season five, and Staite portrayed Jennifer Keller as a main character in season five.

== Series overview ==
Season	Episodes	Originally released	
Season	Episodes	First released	Last released
1	20	July 16, 2004	March 25, 2005
2	20	July 15, 2005	March 10, 2006
3	20	July 14, 2006	June 22, 2007
4	20	September 28, 2007	March 7, 2008
5	20	July 11, 2008	January 9, 2009

Episodes in bold are continuous episodes, where the story spans over 2 or more episodes.

== Episodes ==
=== Season 1 (2004–05) ===
The series picks up the story arc from Stargate SG-1's "Lost City", where people from all around the world come together to form an expedition and discover the wonders of Atlantis. Discovering that they have been cut off from Earth, they must fend for themselves, and discover a powerful new enemy bent on human subjugation.

No. overall	No. in season	Title	Directed by	Written by	Original release date
1	1	"**Rising**"	Martin Wood	Brad Wright & Robert C. Cooper	July 16, 2004
2	2	"**Rising**"	Martin Wood	Brad Wright & Robert C. Cooper	July 16, 2004
3	3	"Hide and Seek"	David Warry-Smith	Story by : Brad Wright & Robert C. Cooper; Teleplay by : Robert C. Cooper	July 23, 2004
4	4	"Thirty-Eight Minutes"	Mario Azzopardi	Brad Wright	July 30, 2004
5	5	"Suspicion"	Mario Azzopardi	Story by : Kerry Glover; Teleplay by : Joseph Mallozzi & Paul Mullie	August 6, 2004
6	6	"Childhood's End"	David Winning	Martin Gero	August 13, 2004
7	7	"Poisoning the Well"	Brad Turner	Story by : Mary Kaiser; Teleplay by : Damian Kindler	August 20, 2004
8	8	"Underground"	Brad Turner	Peter DeLuise	August 27, 2004
9	9	"Home"	Holly Dale	Joseph Mallozzi & Paul Mullie	September 10, 2004
10	10	"**The Storm**"	Martin Wood	Story by : Jill Blotevogel; Teleplay by : Martin Gero	September 17, 2004
11	11	"**The Eye**"	Martin Wood	Martin Gero	January 21, 2005
12	12	"The Defiant One"	Peter DeLuise	Peter DeLuise	January 28, 2005
13	13	"Hot Zone"	Mario Azzopardi	Martin Gero	February 4, 2005
14	14	"Sanctuary"	James Head	Alan Brennert	February 11, 2005
15	15	"Before I Sleep"	Andy Mikita	Carl Binder	February 18, 2005
16	16	"The Brotherhood"	Martin Wood	Martin Gero	February 25, 2005
17	17	"Letters from Pegasus"	Mario Azzopardi	Carl Binder	March 4, 2005
18	18	"The Gift"	Peter DeLuise	Story by : Robert C. Cooper & Martin Gero; Teleplay by : Robert C. Cooper	March 11, 2005
19	19	"'**The Siege**"	Martin Wood	Martin Gero	March 18, 2005
20	20	"'**The Siege**"	Martin Wood	Joseph Mallozzi & Paul Mullie	March 25, 2005

=== Season 2 (2005–06) ===
The story continues when the Daedalus arrives and renews the expedition's connection to Earth. This takes place alongside the Ori story arc in SG-1, and the Wraith become an even larger threat in the Pegasus Galaxy. But what they deal with in their second year might be more than they can handle, and Dr. Carson Beckett's retrovirus is more trouble than it's worth.

No. overall	No. in season	Title	Directed by	Written by	Original release date
21	1	"**The Siege Part III**"	Martin Wood	Martin Gero	July 15, 2005
22	2	"The Intruder"	Peter DeLuise	Joseph Mallozzi & Paul Mullie	July 22, 2005
23	3	"Runner"	Martin Wood	Robert C. Cooper	July 29, 2005
24	4	"Duet"	Peter DeLuise	Martin Gero	August 5, 2005
25	5	"Condemned"	Peter DeLuise	Story by : Sean Carley; Teleplay by : Carl Binder	August 12, 2005
26	6	"Trinity"	Martin Wood	Damian Kindler	August 19, 2005
27	7	"**Instinct**"	Andy Mikita	Treena Hancock & Melissa R. Byer	August 26, 2005
28	8	"**Conversion**"	Brad Turner	Story by : Robert C. Cooper & Martin Gero; Teleplay by : Martin Gero	September 9, 2005
29	9	"Aurora"	Martin Wood	Story by : Carl Binder & Brad Wright; Teleplay by : Carl Binder	September 23, 2005
30	10	"**The Lost Boys**"	Brad Turner	Martin Gero	September 23, 2005
31	11	"**The Hive**"	Martin Wood	Carl Binder	January 6, 2006
32	12	"Epiphany"	Neil Fearnley	Story by : Joe Flanigan & Brad Wright; Teleplay by : Brad Wright	January 13, 2006
33	13	"Critical Mass"	Andy Mikita	Story by : Brad Wright & Carl Binder; Teleplay by : Carl Binder	January 20, 2006
34	14	"Grace Under Pressure"	Martin Wood	Martin Gero	January 27, 2006
35	15	"The Tower"	Andy Mikita	Joseph Mallozzi & Paul Mullie	February 3, 2006
36	16	"The Long Goodbye"	Andy Mikita	Damian Kindler	February 10, 2006
37	17	"Coup d'État"	Martin Wood	Martin Gero	February 17, 2006
38	18	"Michael"	Martin Wood	Carl Binder	February 24, 2006
39	19	"Inferno"	Peter DeLuise	Carl Binder	March 3, 2006
40	20	"**Allies**"	Andy Mikita	Martin Gero	March 10, 2006

=== Season 3 (2006–07) ===
This season concentrates on more character-driven stories. Along with new insight on the characters, the expedition discovers a new threat, one that could be the precursor to the Replicators. Some important characters leave the series in this season, and the fate of Atlantis once again is in the hands of the humans from Earth.

No. overall	No. in season	Title	Directed by	Written by	Original release date
41	1	"**No Man's Land**"	Martin Wood	Martin Gero	July 14, 2006
42	2	"**Misbegotten**"	Martin Wood	Joseph Mallozzi & Paul Mullie	July 21, 2006
43	3	"Irresistible"	Martin Wood	Story by : Brad Wright & Robert C. Cooper; Teleplay by : Carl Binder	July 28, 2006
44	4	"Sateda"	Robert C. Cooper	Robert C. Cooper	August 4, 2006
45	5	"**Progeny**"	Andy Mikita	Story by : Robert C. Cooper & Carl Binder; Teleplay by : Carl Binder	August 11, 2006
46	6	"**The Real World**"	Paul Ziller	Carl Binder	August 18, 2006
47	7	"Common Ground"	William Waring	Ken Cuperus	August 25, 2006
48	8	"McKay and Mrs. Miller"	Martin Wood	Martin Gero	September 8, 2006
49	9	"Phantoms"	Martin Wood	Carl Binder	September 15, 2006
50	10	"**The Return**"	Brad Turner	Martin Gero	September 22, 2006
51	11	"**The Return**"	Brad Turner	Martin Gero	April 13, 2007
52	12	"Echoes"	William Waring	Story by : Carl Binder & Brad Wright; Teleplay by : Carl Binder	April 20, 2007
53	13	"Irresponsible"	Martin Wood	Joseph Mallozzi & Paul Mullie	April 27, 2007
54	14	"Tao of Rodney"	Martin Wood	Damian Kindler	May 4, 2007
55	15	"The Game"	William Waring	Story by : Don Whitehead & Holly Henderson; Teleplay by : Carl Binder	May 11, 2007
56	16	"The Ark"	Martin Wood	Story by : Scott Nimerfro & Ken Cuperus; Teleplay by : Ken Cuperus	May 18, 2007
57	17	"Sunday"	William Waring	Martin Gero	June 1, 2007
58	18	"Submersion"	Brenton Spencer	Ken Cuperus	June 8, 2007
59	19	"Vengeance"	Andy Mikita	Carl Binder	June 15, 2007
60	20	"**First Strike**"	Martin Wood	Martin Gero	June 22, 2007

=== Season 4 (2007–08) ===
Amanda Tapping (Col. Samantha Carter) joined the cast as a regular for 14 episodes, Jewel Staite (Dr. Jennifer Keller) became a recurring character for eight episodes, while regular cast member Torri Higginson (Dr. Weir) became a recurring cast member for four episodes. The season started September 28, 2007, airing on the SCI FI channel in the United States. In the United Kingdom, the season premiered on Tuesday, October 9, 2007 on Sky One.

No. overall	No. in season	Title	Directed by	Written by	Original release date
61	1	"**Adrift**"	Martin Wood	Martin Gero	September 28, 2007
62	2	"**Lifeline**"	Martin Wood	Carl Binder	October 5, 2007
63	3	"Reunion"	William Waring	Joseph Mallozzi & Paul Mullie	October 12, 2007
64	4	"Doppelganger"	Robert C. Cooper	Robert C. Cooper	October 19, 2007
65	5	"Travelers"	William Waring	Joseph Mallozzi & Paul Mullie	October 26, 2007
66	6	"Tabula Rasa"	Martin Wood	Alan McCullough	November 2, 2007
67	7	"Missing"	Andy Mikita	Carl Binder	November 9, 2007
68	8	"The Seer"	Andy Mikita	Alan McCullough	November 16, 2007
69	9	"Miller's Crossing"	Andy Mikita	Martin Gero	November 30, 2007
70	10	"**This Mortal Coil**"	William Waring	Story by : Brad Wright and Joseph Mallozzi & Paul Mullie; Teleplay by : Joseph Mallozzi & Paul Mullie	December 7, 2007
71	11	"**Be All My Sins Remember'd**"	Andy Mikita	Martin Gero	January 4, 2008
72	12	"**Spoils of War**"	William Waring	Alan McCullough	January 11, 2008
73	13	"Quarantine"	Martin Wood	Carl Binder	January 18, 2008
74	14	"Harmony"	William Waring	Martin Gero	January 25, 2008
75	15	"Outcast"	Andy Mikita	Teleplay by : Alan McCullough; Based upon an episode concept by : Joe Flanigan	February 1, 2008
76	16	"Trio"	Martin Wood	Martin Gero	February 8, 2008
77	17	"Midway"	Andy Mikita	Carl Binder	February 15, 2008
78	18	"**The Kindred**"	Peter F. Woeste	Joseph Mallozzi & Paul Mullie	February 22, 2008
79	19	"**The Kindred**"	Martin Wood	Alan McCullough	February 29, 2008
80	20	"**The Last Man**"	Martin Wood	Joseph Mallozzi & Paul Mullie	March 7, 2008

=== Season 5 (2008–09) ===
After being a regular character in season four, Amanda Tapping (Colonel Samantha Carter) became a guest star in several episodes. Robert Picardo (Richard Woolsey) joined the cast as a permanent character as Woolsey assumes command of Atlantis. Actress Jewel Staite (Dr. Jennifer Keller) was promoted from a recurring character to a permanent cast member. Michael Shanks (Dr. Daniel Jackson) and Paul McGillion (Dr. Carson Beckett) appeared as guest stars in this season, with McGillion appearing in five episodes. Actress Torri Higginson had stated that she would not be reprising her role as Dr. Elizabeth Weir in the fifth season. Rainbow Sun Francks as Aiden Ford was given a brief cameo appearance in "Search and Rescue". This was the last season of Stargate Atlantis.

No. overall	No. in season	Title	Directed by	Written by	Original release date
81	1	"**Search and Rescue**"	Andy Mikita	Martin Gero	July 11, 2008
82	2	"The Seed"	William Waring	Joseph Mallozzi & Paul Mullie	July 18, 2008
83	3	"Broken Ties"	Ken Girotti	Joseph Mallozzi & Paul Mullie	July 25, 2008
84	4	"The Daedalus Variations"	Andy Mikita	Alan McCullough	August 1, 2008
85	5	"Ghost in the Machine"	Ken Girotti	Carl Binder	August 15, 2008
86	6	"The Shrine"	Andy Mikita	Brad Wright	August 22, 2008
87	7	"Whispers"	William Waring	Joseph Mallozzi & Paul Mullie	September 5, 2008
88	8	"The Queen"	Brenton Spencer	Story by : Alex Levine & Alan McCullough; Teleplay by : Alan McCullough	September 12, 2008
89	9	"Tracker"	William Waring	Story by : David Schmidt & Carl Binder; Teleplay by : Carl Binder	September 19, 2008
90	10	"**First Contact**"	Andy Mikita	Martin Gero	September 26, 2008
91	11	"**The Lost Tribe**"	Andy Mikita	Martin Gero	October 10, 2008
92	12	"Outsiders"	William Waring	Alan McCullough	October 17, 2008
93	13	"Inquisition"	Brenton Spencer	Alex Levine	October 24, 2008
94	14	"The Prodigal"	Andy Mikita	Carl Binder	November 7, 2008
95	15	"Remnants"	William Waring	Joseph Mallozzi & Paul Mullie	November 14, 2008
96	16	"Brain Storm"	Martin Gero	Martin Gero	November 21, 2008
97	17	"Infection"	Andy Mikita	Alan McCullough	December 5, 2008
98	18	"Identity"	William Waring	Carl Binder	December 12, 2008
99	19	"Vegas"	Robert C. Cooper	Robert C. Cooper	January 2, 2009
100	20	"Enemy at the Gate"	Andy Mikita	Joseph Mallozzi & Paul Mullie	January 9, 2009

== DVD & Blu-ray releases ==
Product	Episodes	DVD release date			Blu-ray release date	
Product	Episodes	Region 1	Region 2	Region 4	Region A	Region B
Season 1 (2004/05)	20	November 15, 2005	March 13, 2006	November 16, 2005	November 27, 2012	July 18, 2012 Australia only
Season 2 (2005/06)	20	March 6, 2007	February 26, 2007	November 8, 2006	November 27, 2012	July 18, 2012 Australia only
Season 3 (2006/07)	20	September 18, 2007	January 14, 2008	September 25, 2007	November 27, 2012	July 18, 2012 Australia only
Season 4 (2007/08)	20	July 8, 2008	August 4, 2008	September 3, 2008	November 27, 2012	July 18, 2012 Australia only
Season 5 (2008/09)	20	June 30, 2009	August 10, 2009	July 28, 2009	November 27, 2012	July 18, 2012 Australia only
The Complete Series Collection	100	October 6, 2009	August 10, 2009	July 28, 2009	July 26, 2011	September 19, 2011

== See also ==
- List of Stargate SG-1 episodes
- List of Stargate Universe episodes
