= Search and Rescue (Stargate Atlantis) =

- Stargate Atlantis episode
- Episode no.: Season 5 Episode 1
- Directed by: Andy Mikita
- Written by: Martin Gero
- Production code: 501
- Original air date: July 11, 2008

Guest appearances
- Rainbow Sun Francks as Aiden Ford; Amanda Tapping as Samantha Carter; Connor Trinneer as Michael; Mitch Pileggi as Steven Caldwell; Kavan Smith as Evan Lorne; Martin Christopher as Marks; Patrick Sabongui as Kanaan; Leela Savasta as Alicia Vega; Jeremy Jones as Edison; Sharon Taylor as Amelia Banks; Annalise MacCullouch as Torren John Emmagan

Episode chronology
| ← Previous "The Last Man (Part 1)" | Next → "The Seed" |
- Stargate Atlantis (season 5)

"Search and Rescue" is the fifth season premiere of science fiction television show Stargate Atlantis, and is the 81st episode of the series. The episode premiered on July 11, 2008 in the United States on SCI FI channel, and was then shown on Canada's The Movie Network. The episode premiered over a month later in the United Kingdom on August 19 on Sky One. iTunes USA also made the episode available for download several days later. However, by the next episode, "Seed", shows will be added at the same time as they are scheduled to air. This is the 26th episode of Stargate Atlantis to be written by Martin Gero. The episode introduces several changes in the personnel and command of Atlantis, seeing Richard Woolsey (Robert Picardo) take over command of the base.

The episode continues on from Season Four's finale — "The Last Man" — on a series of story arcs based around Wraith character "Michael" (played by Connor Trinneer). In the previous episode, Lieutenant Colonel John Sheppard (Joe Flanigan) is transported forward 48,000 years into the future in an accident involving the Stargate and a solar flare, ultimately leading him to find out the fate of his teammates and the fate of Teyla Emmagan (Rachel Luttrell) in particular — who in his time line still remains captive by Michael. Sheppard manages to return to Atlantis in his proper time line (the year 2008), where he along with McKay (David Hewlett), Ronon Dex (Jason Momoa) and Major Lorne's team gate to the world where he determines Teyla will be taken. However, they arrive prematurely and during a sweep of the computers, McKay triggers a booby trap that causes the entire complex to collapse on top of the team.

== Plot ==
With an explosion leaving the team buried under rubble, Sheppard lies unconscious, and his lost friend Aiden Ford (Rainbow Sun Francks) tells him how he failed to help him (in the episode "The Hive"), just as he has failed to help Teyla. He then awakens, with Ronon Dex at his side, only to find out that falling debris has significantly injured him. On the other hand, Dex is in far better condition and is able to move around, and works to free Sheppard from the rubble. McKay and Major Lorne (Kavan Smith) also end up being trapped in a different location. While Lorne has a broken leg, McKay only ends up with a few scrapes and bruises. Michael is quickly informed that his compound has been compromised, and takes his cruiser to the planet.

Lieutenant Edison (Jeremy Jones), who dispatched with Lt. Col. Sheppard & Maj. Lorne's teams, manages to return to Atlantis to inform them of the situation on the planet. Additional personnel quickly return to the planet with combat engineers. Michael arrives soon after, and quickly deploys Darts to sweep the compound site. The combat engineers are able to recover McKay and Lorne and evacuate the site in Puddle Jumpers; however, Dex and Sheppard still remain trapped. Michael's hybrids soon start digging the two out. The USAF ship Daedalus arrives in orbit and is engaged by Michael's cruiser, which, upon failing to deliver a sufficient amount of damage to Daedalus, attempts to retreat. Daedalus manages to hit the cruiser's hyperdrive core, taking it off-line. Michael's hybrids almost reach Sheppard and Dex, but just in time Daedalus manages to use the Asgard transport systems to bring the two on board. In order to beam Sheppard and Dex out, the shields of the Daedalus are lowered temporarily, and Michael's cruiser is able to score a few direct hits taking the Asgard weapons and engines off-line. Samantha Carter (Amanda Tapping) and teams aboard the three Jumpers also manage to get on board, after which the shields are raised again.

Realizing that Teyla Emmagan is likely aboard Michael's cruiser, the reunited team plan a mission to get aboard the ship using a cloaked Puddle Jumper and attacking the cruiser with F-302 fightercraft, which will force the cruiser to open the bay doors so Darts may deploy. The attack is a success, and while the cloaked Jumper enters the cruiser, the F-302s knock out Michael's primary weapon systems. The team discovers Teyla, already in labor, and are preparing to leave when the cruiser's hyperdrive is brought back online. Sheppard and Dex head out to disable it again, and McKay is forced to help deliver Emmagan's child by himself; both groups end up successful. Upon reaching the spot where they had left their Jumper, it is discovered to be missing (Stolen by Michael, who later uses it to infiltrate Atlantis), and another method must be found to leave the ship. Kanaan (Patrick Sabongui), Emmagan's child's father and a soldier in Michael's army, helps the team escape in a Wraith Dart. Daedalus, which has regained control of their Asgard weapons, swiftly destroys Michael's cruiser upon the team's return to safety.

At the episode's ending, Carter returns to Earth, where she is to go off-world with SG-1 to witness the extraction ceremony of the last system lord Ba'al (Stargate: Continuum). Upon arriving, she is told by Richard Woolsey (Robert Picardo) that she will not be returning to Atlantis, and will be replaced as expedition leader by Woolsey himself.

== Production ==
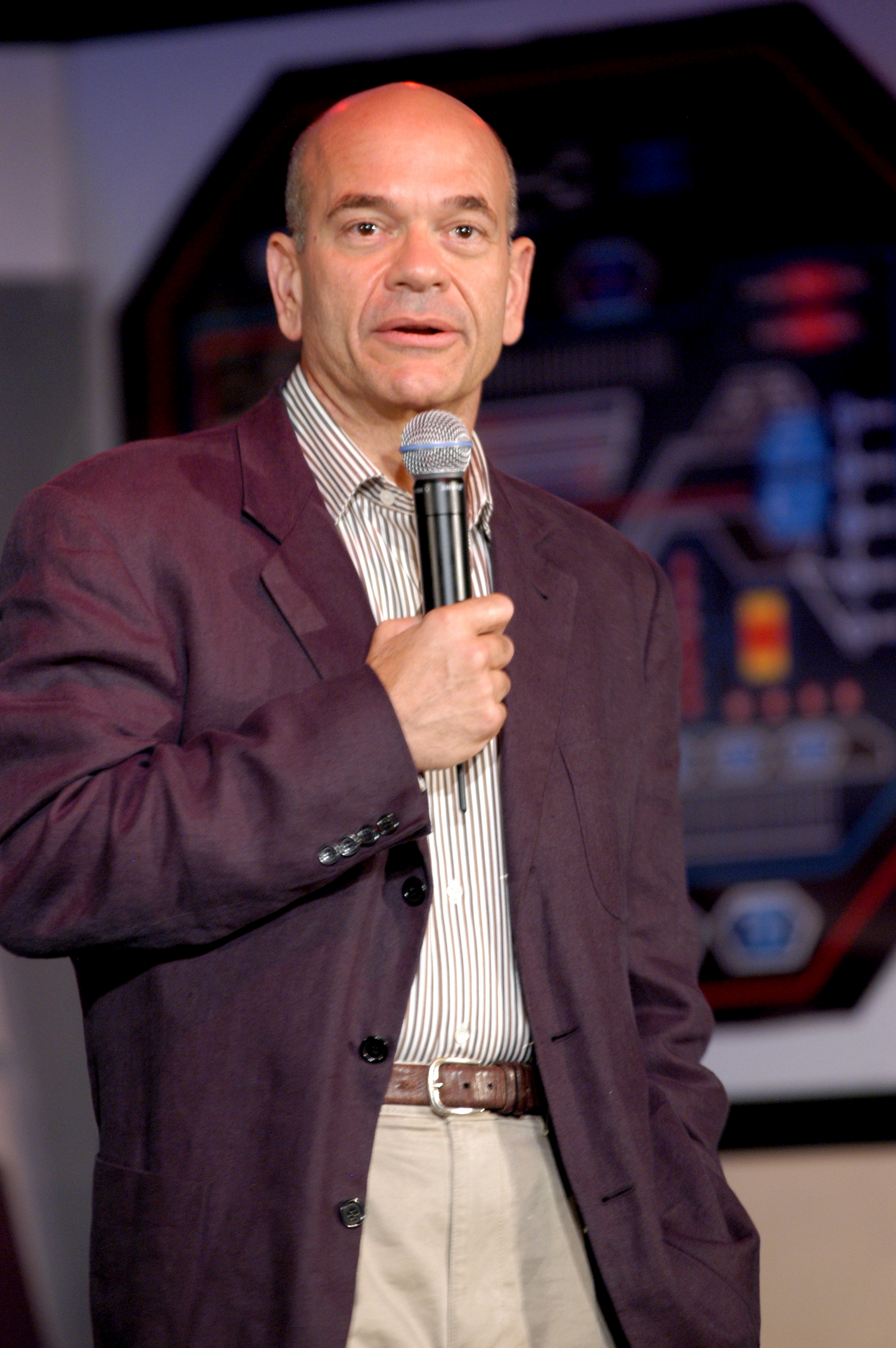
Robert Picardo joins the cast as series regular.

Filming of the episode, and the season itself, began on February 18, 2008 at The Bridge Studios in Vancouver. The regular cast of Joe Flanigan (Lt. Col. John Sheppard), Rachel Luttrell (Teyla Emmagan), Jason Momoa (Ronon Dex) and David Hewlett (Rodney McKay) would from this point be joined by Jewel Staite (Jennifer Keller) and Robert Picardo (Richard Woolsey) as regular cast members. Picardo's character Woolsey replaces Col. Samantha Carter (Amanda Tapping) as commander of the Atlantis Expedition. Tapping's decision to leave Atlantis came after her show Sanctuary was picked up by the U.S. SCI FI channel.

The episode also introduces Captain Alicia Vega (Leela Savasta), who will become a recurring character on the show. Several scenes in "Search and Rescue" were to feature Vega, however, the majority were cut from the final episode. The episode features an appearance by Rainbow Sun Francks as Lt. Aiden Ford, and is his first appearance since Season Two's episode "The Hive".

During the production and writing process, "Search and Rescue" was said to have gone through fourteen different working titles, before finally settling on its final name. Producing the episode also proved expensive, and the visual effect sequence during the introduction where they zoom through space from M2S-445 to Michael was considered to be cut due to the high cost of such a sequence, though since Stargate Atlantis is in good terms with Mark Savela and the visual effects team, the sequence was still produced. During filming, an actual fifteen-day-old baby was cast during the scene where Teyla gave birth, since the producers did not wish to follow other TV series and movies, and use a fake baby. The full final version of the episode was leaked to the Internet on June 19, 2008, continuing a trend since Season Two of premiere episodes leaking before their television air date.

The Simpsons trademark "Duff Beer" is mentioned in the episode during the scene where Michael's hybrids are trying to dig Sheppard and Dex out of the debris. Sheppard asks the hybrids whether they would like "Oprah Ale" or "Duff Beer" upon returning to Atlantis; when the hybrids respond that they want Duff, Sheppard is alerted to the fact that they are not from the Atlantis Expedition.

== Reception ==
The episode attracted over 1.8 million viewers in the United States, and scored a 1.3 average household rating, beating season Four's premiere episode, "Adrift", by one-tenth of a point. The episode was ranked the #4 cable program for the day among the 25 to 54 age demographic, and ranked #5 for viewers 18 to 49 viewers. The premiere also made SCI FI the number one cable network for men 25 to 54 during the 10:00 p.m. hour. IGN rated the episode at 8.3 (out of 10), stating that while the episode's ending was predictable, it was well executed, and also praising Jason Momoa performance and the progression of Ronon Dex as a character. Alex Strachan of The Gazette in Montreal praised the episode, stating "The whole family can watch together and not be offended, and you don't have to worry that the story will go to pieces in the end." He also praised the series as a whole, crediting it for "clinging to life and prospering in an increasingly fractured - and fractious - TV universe." Additionally TiVo delayed viewings later boosted ratings and figures, with around half a million people watching the show a week after its airing on TiVo, "The episode averaged 1.3 million viewers in the 18 to 49 demographic, and 1.4 million among viewers 25 to 54. It's Atlantis's best performance since Season Four's finale in March (2.6 million total viewers), and up an impressive 22 percent from last season's average, according to SCI FI".
