= The Shrine (Stargate Atlantis) =

- Stargate Atlantis episode
- Episode no.: Season 5 Episode 6
- Directed by: Andy Mikita
- Written by: Brad Wright
- Production code: 506
- Original air date: August 22, 2008

Guest appearances
- David Nykl as Radek Zelenka; Kate Hewlett as Jeannie Miller; Sharon Taylor as Amelia Banks

Episode chronology
← Previous "Ghost in the Machine"	Next → "Whispers"
- Stargate Atlantis (season 5)

"The Shrine" is the sixth episode of the fifth season of the science fiction television series Stargate Atlantis. The episode is also the 300th produced episode in the overall Stargate franchise. The episode first aired on August 22, 2008 on the Sci Fi Channel in the United States, and subsequently aired on October 23 on Sky1 in the United Kingdom. The episode was nominated for a Nebula Award, and a further four Leo Awards.

The episode focuses on Dr. Rodney McKay, who has been infected with a disease known as "Second Childhood", which is considered the Pegasus equivalent of rapid-onset Alzheimer's disease, where he quickly reverts to a childlike state. The only way for the team to save him is to send him to a shrine on the planet of Talus, which has since turned into a Wraith outpost.

== Plot ==
Jeannie Miller, Rodney McKay's sister, comes to Atlantis when she learns her brother has been infected with a mysterious disease known as the "Second Childhood", the Pegasus equivalent of rapid-onset Alzheimer's disease. The Expedition gives Jeannie a chance to say goodbye; Rodney has already regressed to a childlike state and all attempts at medical intervention have failed. Jennifer Keller explains that McKay became infected with the Second Childhood parasite at some point over the past two weeks, and that she misinterpreted the first symptoms when they appeared after a mission to M44-5YN. The subsequent deterioration of McKay's mind is shown through a series of flashbacks and self-made video recordings. Keller blames herself for not catching the disease sooner, but refuses to give up even as McKay has only a few days left to live. Ronon Dex proposes an alternative: a shrine on the planet Talus that grants those afflicted with the Second Childhood a single day of mental clarity, followed by a quick death. Jeannie overrules Keller's wishes and asks that McKay be brought to the planet. Despite the fact that the planet has become a Wraith stronghold, Richard Woolsey reluctantly approves the mission.

The team reaches the shrine in a puddle jumper, where McKay miraculously returns to normal. Keller determines that the shrine is emitting dangerous radiation that is causing the parasite to shrink so as to protect itself. As the parasite would rapidly and fatally re-expand were McKay to leave the shrine, and they cannot retrieve medical supplies from Atlantis due to the Wraith, Keller operates on him inside the shrine using improvised tools. Once she drills into McKay's skull, the parasite leaves to escape the radiation, and is destroyed by Ronon. At the end of the episode, Keller watches one of McKay's video diary entries, where McKay confesses his love for her, putting a smile on her face.

== Production ==
Since Stargate SG-1 produced 214 episodes, and this episode is the 86th produced from Stargate Atlantis, this makes "The Shrine" the 300th episode produced in the Stargate franchise. When writer Brad Wright was asked to write this episode, he originally came up with two ideas, "The Shrine", and "The Replacements", which was meant to be an episode about where Sheppard's team went missing for six months, and finally returned to see completely different crew in the Atlantis Expedition. However, since the cast change from Amanda Tapping (Samantha Carter) to Robert Picardo (Richard Woolsey) from the beginning of the season, the idea for "The Replacement" was dropped, and Wright went with "The Shrine". The working title of the episode was "The Shrine of Talus", but was changed to "The Shrine", due to clearance issues with releasing the title. The final draft of the script was completed around 10 March 2008. Filming for the episode took place on the week starting on 22 April. The episode's writer, Brad Wright was somewhat inspired by the Daniel Keyes novel, Flowers for Algernon for the plot of the episode.

The episode mainly focused on David Hewlett's character, Rodney McKay. Hewlett's real-life sister, Kate Hewlett made an appearance as Jeannie Miller, McKay's sister. This episode was the fourth to star Kate Hewlett's character. David Nykl was credited as his role of Radek Zelenka. However, by the time of the finished product, all of his scenes were cut out. Zelenka was, however, mentioned in a scene, and despite having all his scenes cut, he was seen for a few seconds, walking past the camera, where the Czech flag was clearly visible from his arm.

== Reception ==
"The Shrine" received a 1.2 household ratings (1.6 million viewers) from Nielsen ratings, which is considered average for the season so far. The episode was however, beaten by Eureka with 1.8, Ghost Hunters International with 1.6, and ECW on Syfy with 1.5, making "The Shrine" the fourth most viewed show on Syfy for that week. On Sky One, the episode received viewing figures of 497,000, which was the third most watched TV programme for the channel that week. IGN had given the episode a rating of 9.2 out of 10, which is considered outstanding. Tony Ireland Mell, the reviewer, praised the episode for numerous reasons, including the depth of Hewlett's character, through the day-by-day progression of McKay's video diary.

In 2009, Brad Wright's script for "The Shrine" was nominated for a Nebula Award, alongside The Dark Knight and Wall-E. It was also nominated for four Leo Awards in its upcoming 2009 show. The four nominations include "Best Screenwriting in a Dramatic Series" (nominated to Wright), "Best Cinematography in a Dramatic Series" (nominated to Jim Menard), "Best Picture Editing in a Dramatic Series" (nominated to Brad Rines) and "Best Lead Performance by a Male in a Dramatic Series" (nominated to David Hewlett).
