= Stargate Atlantis season 5 =

Stargate Atlantis
- Season 5
- DVD cover
- No. of episodes: 20

Release
- Original network: Sci Fi Channel
- Original release: July 11, 2008 – January 9, 2009

Season chronology
- ← Previous; Season 4

The fifth and final season of the military science fiction television series Stargate Atlantis commenced airing on the Sci Fi Channel in the United States on July 11, 2008, concluded on the same channel on January 9, 2009, and contained 20 episodes. The show itself is a spin off of its sister show, Stargate SG-1. The season upgrades previous supporting characters cast members such as Richard Woolsey (from Stargate SG-1) and Jennifer Keller. Amanda Tapping's character Samantha Carter was downgraded to recurring character in this season. The fifth and final season is about a military-science expedition team fighting against the Wraith from their base of operation, Atlantis. The Wraith primary goal is to gather a fleet to invade Atlantis and find their new "feeding ground", Earth.

The one-hour premiere "Search and Rescue", which aired on July 11, 2008, received 1.3 in Nielsen household ratings, in contrast a "Big" increase from the previous season ratings. The series was developed by Brad Wright and Robert C. Cooper, who also served as executive producers. Season five regular cast members include Joe Flanigan, Rachel Luttrell, Jason Momoa, Jewel Staite, with Robert Picardo, and David Hewlett. Stargate Atlantis was originally planned to be continued by a two-hour movie entitled Stargate: Extinction but executive producer Brad Wright has announced that the film has been permanently shelved.

== Cast ==
- Starring Joe Flanigan as Lt. Colonel John Sheppard
- Rachel Luttrell as Teyla Emmagan
- Jason Momoa as Ronon Dex
- Jewel Staite as Dr. Jennifer Keller
- With Robert Picardo as Richard Woolsey
- And David Hewlett as Dr. Rodney McKay

Amanda Tapping's character, Colonel Samantha Carter, having been a regular during the previous season, became a guest star for several episodes of season five. Robert Picardo joined the permanent cast, with his character, Richard Woolsey, assuming command of Atlantis. Jewel Staite's character, Dr. Jennifer Keller, was also promoted from recurring to regular. Both Michael Shanks (Dr. Daniel Jackson) and Paul McGillion (Dr. Carson Beckett) appeared as guest stars in this season, with McGillion appearing in 5 episodes. Torri Higginson declined to reprise her role as Dr. Elizabeth Weir in the fifth season. The remainder of the season five regular cast comprised Joe Flanigan, Rachel Luttrell, Jason Momoa, and David Hewlett.

== Episodes ==
Episodes in bold are continuous episodes, where the story spans over 2 or more episodes.

No. overall	No. in season	Title	Directed by	Written by	Original release date
81	1	"**Search and Rescue**"	Andy Mikita	Martin Gero	July 11, 2008
Carter launches a rescue operation for the victims of a huge off-world explosion; but the rescue party must combat Michael and his army, who also wish to recover the survivors. Michael is ultimately defeated and Teyla, who gives birth to a son, is rescued.
82	2	"The Seed"	William Waring	Joseph Mallozzi & Paul Mullie	July 18, 2008
The clone of Dr. Carson Beckett is removed from stasis to receive a possible cure, and in turn is the only one who possibly can find a cure for a serious medical problem before it is too late for one of his closest friends. Dr. Keller is being used to grow a Wraith ship which takes over a section of Atlantis.
83	3	"Broken Ties"	Ken Girotti	Joseph Mallozzi & Paul Mullie	July 25, 2008
Ronon is reunited with Tyre, a former Satedan warrior turned "Wraith worshiper" (from season 4's "Reunion"). Having apparently turned on his new masters and broken free of their brainwashing, Tyre hopes to rebuild his destroyed relationship with Ronon and Atlantis. But things go badly when Ronon is kidnapped by a Wraith who tortures him, and a non-lucid Tyre may be the only person who can save Ronon before the Wraith brainwash him. After going through withdrawal from the Wraith enzyme, Tyre leads the team to the lab where Ronon is, but turns on them to get another fix after Ronon is revealed to be brainwashed. The Wraith tries to torture Sheppard, but Tyre reveals that he was faking his return to the Wraith and battles Ronon while Sheppard battles the Wraith. The rest of the team, having earlier been freed by Tyre, stuns Ronon, while Tyre sacrifices himself to blow up the lab and let the others escape. On Atlantis, the team manages to break Ronon's brainwashing and he mourns his old friend.
84	4	"The Daedalus Variations"	Andy Mikita	Alan McCullough	August 1, 2008
The Daedalus appears in orbit, abandoned, when the team knows it is currently on its way to Earth. Investigating, they discover that it is not the real Daedalus. It is jumping between different realities, powered by a so-called "alternate reality drive". Now the team is up against the clock: they must figure out a way to get back to their own reality before the drive burns out. They must also overcome the daunting discovery that another version of themselves explored the ship and died trying to do the same.
85	5	"Ghost in the Machine"	Ken Girotti	Carl Binder	August 15, 2008
Dr. Elizabeth Weir returns to Atlantis in the form of a "digitally ascended" being, who hopes to use Atlantis to construct human bodies for her consciousness and for those of eight other Replicators who likewise hope to Ascend. Weir convinces the team to allow the other Replicators to rebuild their bodies after she summons them once she rebuilds her own as FRAN, the Replicator McKay had previously created in order for them to build themselves human bodies to live in. However, one of the Replicators, Koracen, doesn't like it and escapes the lab in order to remain a Replicator and seek Ascension. When he tries to kill Sheppard, Weir destroys him and realizing that she and the other Replicators are too much of a threat, sacrifices herself to trick the other Replicators through a Spacegate where they are frozen forever by the cold of space and deactivated.
86	6	"The Shrine"	Andy Mikita	Brad Wright	August 22, 2008
After a mission to M44-5YN, a planet undergoing global warming, Rodney McKay begins suffering from the Pegasus Galaxy's equivalent of Alzheimer's disease. In the hope of saving him, the team bring him to Talus, a planet once inhabited by the Ancients, to a "shrine" which overcomes the symptoms of the disease for one day.
87	7	"Whispers"	William Waring	Joseph Mallozzi & Paul Mullie	September 5, 2008
Sheppard and Beckett join Major Anne Teldy’s team on a planet with one of Michael’s research facilities for the early versions of his human-iratus hybrids concealed inside a cave system. The team battles the hybrids and kills them. Beckett, who helped out, leaves Atlantis for good to travel the galaxy and help the people out there.
88	8	"The Queen"	Brenton Spencer	Story by : Alex Levine & Alan McCullough; Teleplay by : Alan McCullough	September 12, 2008
Teyla is posing as Todd's Wraith Queen, giving him the authority to enter talks with another hive and its Queen in order to get the Wraith to use a new gene therapy to eliminate their need to feed. It's not too long before suspicion is cast upon them after Todd kills the other Queen and they must work together to maintain their plot. Teyla ends up taking the Queen's hive into battle with a rival hive in order to kill as many Wraith as possible. Teyla's hive is nearly destroyed, but Sheppard and the rest of the team arrives in a Puddle Jumper and severely damages the other hive, allowing Teyla's hive to destroy it. The team is captured and Teyla's interactions with them cause the suspicious Wraith to try to kill her, but Todd saves her and kills the Wraith. Teyla leaves Todd in charge of the hive and its alliance and returns to Atlantis where she is returned to normal.
89	9	"Tracker"	William Waring	Story by : David Schmidt & Carl Binder; Teleplay by : Carl Binder	September 19, 2008
The team comes to the aid of a village under Wraith threat, but Ronon and McKay must rescue one of their own when Dr. Keller is kidnapped by another Runner, like Ronon, named Kiryk, who has brought Wraith hunters to the planet. Ronon is forced to act as a Runner so he can save Dr. Keller from Kiryk. It is eventually revealed that Keller was kidnapped only because her help was needed to treat an injured little girl traveling with Kiryk as he couldn't risk her refusing to help. Keller treats the girl and having earned Kiryk's trust, disables his tracking device before they are reunited with Ronon and McKay. The group defeats a Wraith attack, but finds the Stargate guarded by a group of Wraith and two Darts. Kiryk lures the Wraith through the Stargate to another planet and his fate is unknown, but his sacrifice allows the group to return to Atlantis where the girl recovers and is adopted by a family on the planet where Keller was kidnapped as her own planet was destroyed.
90	10	"**First Contact**"	Andy Mikita	Martin Gero	September 26, 2008
Daniel Jackson returns to Atlantis to do research on the Lantean scientist Janus. But after finding one of Janus' secret labs, McKay and Dr. Jackson disappear after an alien ship appears in Atlantis and First Contact goes less than well. Woolsey boards the Daedalus with Ronon and Keller to meet with Todd to discuss Dr. Keller's gene therapy. The aliens force McKay and Jackson to activate a device that will destroy Wraith ships when they enter hyperspace, but with the side-effect that Stargates will explode when they are activated. Todd believes he has been betrayed and hijacks the Daedalus while Atlantis manages to track down McKay and Jackson but has the Stargate explode when trying to reach the Daedalus to reach the planet as it has no Stargate.
91	11	"**The Lost Tribe**"	Andy Mikita	Martin Gero	October 10, 2008
Sheppard and Zelenka survive the Stargate explosion, but the city is severely damaged. Todd forces Sheppard to give up the location of the Attero Device and heads there in the Daedalus, which is disabled by Ronon and Keller who escape Wraith capture. Keller is captured and the Wraith fix the hyperdrive and continue their journey, but their delay allows Sheppard, in a Travelers ship sent by Larrin to reach the planet first and engage the aliens who are revealed to be rogue Asgard. Todd and the Wraith flee the Daedalus after sending it on a collision course, but Sheppard saves the ship. McKay and Jackson escape and disable the device, but Jackson is badly injured before the Daedalus rescues them. Sheppard's ship defeats the Asgard, except one ship that flees, and then destroys the facility where the Attero Device is to prevent it from ever being used again.
92	12	"Outsiders"	William Waring	Alan McCullough	October 17, 2008
Sheppard and his team meet a man and a woman named Sefaris and Novo, two of a group of survivors from the planet Balara who survived the Hoffan plague and are now living with the people Dr. Beckett is helping. However, the Balarans face betrayal by their host village when the Wraith come hunting for them. The Wraith capture Beckett and McKay and force them to work on a system to detect survivors of the Hoffan plague, but it allows Beckett to determine he has the drug too and he uses it to kill the Commander and escape. The two disable the hive ship's weapons and escape, allowing Sheppard and the others to defeat the Wraith on the planet and escape with the villagers and the survivors through the Stargate to Atlantis where the people are relocated.
93	13	"Inquisition"	Brenton Spencer	Alex Levine	October 24, 2008
The Atlantis expedition is put on trial for crimes against the Pegasus Galaxy by a group of human civilizations that have formed 'The Coalition', with one Latiran dignitary possibly working for the Genii. Richard Woolsey eventually comes to the Coalition and defends the Atlantis team, despite the Latiran dignitary who blames them for the destruction of their homeworld by the Asurans. Woolsey eventually manages to convince the one unbiased judge that they are innocent, while convincing the one working for the Genii, that Atlantis would be better as the military power of the Coalition, causing them to be found not guilty, despite the Latiran delegate's guilty vote. This episode is a clip show.
94	14	"The Prodigal"	Andy Mikita	Carl Binder	November 7, 2008
In search of Teyla's baby, Michael and his hybrids infiltrate Atlantis. While the hybrids take control of the city's systems one by one, it is up to Sheppard's and Lorne's teams to retake the city. But first, McKay has to disable a seemingly impenetrable stun energy field set up by Michael. Teyla escapes with her son thanks to Woolsey and Ronon. McKay, Sheppard, and Zelenka manage to defeat Michael's plan, forcing him to flee when Sheppard and a strike team kill his remaining hybrids. Michael is finally defeated by Sheppard and Teyla in a hand to hand fight with Teyla finally killing Michael by throwing him from the top of Atlantis' Control Tower.
95	15	"Remnants"	William Waring	Joseph Mallozzi & Paul Mullie	November 14, 2008
John Sheppard has been abducted. After freeing himself from his bonds, he soon discovers who it is who tied him up: Acastus Kolya. In Atlantis, Woolsey, McKay, and the rest of the team are about to make a shocking discovery about an ancient race called the Sekkari, a silicon-based lifeform, which uses severe hallucinations to manipulate them into doing the right thing when a Sekkari seed carrier is found in the ocean. Xiao Shen, an IOA dignitary, comes aboard to judge Woolsey's ability to be a capable commander and is planning on using this situation so she can get control of Atlantis herself. Eventually it is revealed that both Kolya and a woman Woolsey was attracted to are projections of the Sekkari AI trying to distract Sheppard and evaluate Woolsey. The AI wants Woolsey's help to save its race from extinction by transporting it to its target world after it had crashed on Atlantis' home world thousands of years ago. It was trying to distract Sheppard as he was the greatest threat to it, but it never meant him any harm. Woolsey decides to help it even though it could cost him his job and has the Apollo transport it where it needs to go. As a final thanks, the AI tricks the dignitary and saves Woolsey's job.
96	16	"Brain Storm"	Martin Gero	Martin Gero	November 21, 2008
Rodney McKay is invited to a landmark scientific presentation by an old rival (played by Dave Foley) from his school days and takes Keller with him. The device appears to be a solution to global warming, but then everything goes awry. The plan, using a matter bridge to transfer heat to an alternate reality based on the work McKay and Jeannie did in "McKay and Mrs. Miller" backfires when it won't shut off. Eventually the bridge is shut down and after McKay saves Keller's life she admits she loves him and they start a relationship. Bill Nye and Neil deGrasse Tyson make cameo appearances.
97	17	"Infection"	Andy Mikita	Alan McCullough	December 5, 2008
The team investigates mysterious happenings on board a Wraith Hive, where Todd and his crew are suffering from a disease, just to find that since Wraith ships are organic, the ship has the disease as well. It's revealed they got this disease when they tried Keller's gene therapy which did work, but left them with a weakened immune system. Todd offers a possible solution: allow them to be fed on by an iratus bug queen but Sheppard refuses. At the same time the team has to deal with feral Wraith warriors and the ship's deteriorating condition. Eventually the ship splits in half, killing all but the team and Todd, but the front half falls into the planet's atmosphere. Todd manages to land it in the ocean and everyone is rescued by Atlantis before the ship sinks. Keeping a deal he made with Todd and believing Todd could be a powerful ally, Sheppard sends Todd through the Stargate to seek his cure.
98	18	"Identity"	William Waring	Carl Binder	December 12, 2008
Dr. Jennifer Keller is diagnosed with a psychological ailment. However, little does the Atlantis expedition realize that she has been exposed to body-switching technology, similar to the one that SG-1 found in the SG-1 episode "Avalon" that does not require the subjects to be in close proximity. Meanwhile Keller's consciousness faces a desperate struggle for survival inside the body of a wanted fugitive woman named Neeva. Eventually the team finds the device and Ronon destroys it just as Keller is about to be killed by Neeva's associate. Neeva is then presumably killed by her former associate, but both disappear so her fate is unknown.
99	19	"Vegas"	Robert C. Cooper	Robert C. Cooper	January 2, 2009
In an alternate reality, Detective John Sheppard and FBI Agent Richard Woolsey find themselves in the midst of a CSI-like murder case involving several killings apparently of Wraith origin in Las Vegas, Nevada. It's eventually revealed that this Wraith is the only survivor of a hive ship that attacked Earth and was destroyed. The Wraith plans to send a transmission to the other Wraith to lead them to Earth, but Sheppard finds him and enters a gunfight that leaves Sheppard mortally wounded. As the Wraith is about to kill him, two A-10 Thunderbolt IIs sent by Woolsey - whom Sheppard alerted earlier through Dr. Rod McKay - arrive. The Wraith quickly activates his transmitter before the fighters destroy it and him. The transmission never reaches Pegasus, thus saving the alternate Earth, but is sent through to other realities where it will reach Pegasus.
100	20	"Enemy at the Gate"	Andy Mikita	Joseph Mallozzi & Paul Mullie	January 9, 2009
Todd informs Atlantis that a group of Wraith have in their possession several ZPMs which they plan to use to power a new super Wraith Hive. He also advises Woolsey that they should immediately destroy it. But when the team reaches the hive, it does significant damage to the Daedalus and jumps into hyperspace. The team then finds out that the ship has received the signal sent from alternate Earth in "Vegas" and is heading to Earth. The hive shrugs off all efforts to destroy it, including an attack by Atlantis itself, but at the last minute, Sheppard destroys the ship with a nuclear weapon and saves Earth. Atlantis is forced to land on Earth due to lack of power.

== DVD releases ==
DVD name	Region 1	Region 2	Region 4
Stargate Atlantis Season 5	June 30, 2009	May 11, 2009	July 29, 2009
Season 5: Volume 1	—	May 11, 2009	—
Season 5: Volume 2	—	May 25, 2009	—
Season 5: Volume 3	—	June 8, 2009	—
Season 5: Volume 4	—	June 22, 2009	—
Season 5: Volume 5	—	July 13, 2009	—
