= Stargate Atlantis season 4 =

Stargate Atlantis
- Season 4
- DVD cover
- No. of episodes: 20

Release
- Original network: Sci Fi Channel
- Original release: September 28, 2007 – March 7, 2008

Season chronology
- ← Previous; Season 3 Next → Season 5

The fourth season of Stargate Atlantis, an American-Canadian television series, began airing on September 28, 2007 on the US-American Sci Fi Channel. The fourth season concluded after 20 episodes on March 7, 2008 on Sci Fi. The series was developed by Brad Wright and Robert C. Cooper, who also served as executive producers. Amanda Tapping (Col. Samantha Carter) joins the cast as a regular for 14 episodes, and Jewel Staite (Dr. Jennifer Keller) was a recurring character for eleven episodes. In comparison, regular cast member Torri Higginson (Dr. Elizabeth Weir) was a recurring cast member for four episodes. Other season four regular cast members include Joe Flanigan, Rachel Luttrell, with Jason Momoa and David Hewlett.

== Cast ==
- Starring Joe Flanigan as Lt. Colonel John Sheppard
- Amanda Tapping as Colonel Samantha Carter
- Rachel Luttrell as Teyla Emmagan
- With Jason Momoa as Ronon Dex
- And David Hewlett as Dr. Rodney McKay

== Episodes ==
Episodes in bold are continuous episodes, where the story spans over 2 or more episodes.

| No. overall | No. in season | Title | Directed by | Written by | Original release date |
|---|---|---|---|---|---|
| 61 | 1 | "**Adrift**" | Martin Wood | Martin Gero | September 28, 2007 |
Escaping from the Replicators' satellite weapon, Atlantis encounters further problems as the city's shield begins to severely deplete their over-taxed ZPM. With limited resources, the team undertakes a myriad of repairs, whilst Dr. McKay and Dr. Keller are forced to make a tough decision when Elizabeth Weir is injured. Ultimately, they are forced to reactivate Weir's Replicator nanites to save her life. While the city is being repaired, they run too low on power to make it to hyperspace and remain stranded in space. McKay, Sheppard and Zelenka realize that they have a Puddle Jumper with a hyperdrive capable of reaching the nearby Replicator homeworld and decide to raid the planet for a new ZPM.
| 62 | 2 | "**Lifeline**" | Martin Wood | Carl Binder | October 5, 2007 |
Needing a new ZPM, Colonel Sheppard and his team, joined by Elizabeth Weir, launch a daring mission to the Replicator homeworld to steal a new one while Colonel Samantha Carter and Doctor Bill Lee aid the Apollo in searching for the missing city. While the team is able to steal a ZPM with ease due to Weir's connection to the Replicator network, they realize they can input a command that will force the Replicators to go to war with the Wraith. While they are successful in implementing the new command, Weir is captured, buying them time to escape. Despite Weir's efforts, the team ends up trapped, surrounded, and without the power to escape to hyperspace. They are unexpectedly rescued by the Apollo which had located Atlantis and came to help. The Apollo lays down covering fire long enough for them to land then carries them back to Atlantis. With the new ZPM in place, the city is piloted to a new homeworld where it is safely landed.
| 63 | 3 | "Reunion" | William Waring | Joseph Mallozzi & Paul Mullie | October 12, 2007 |
When Ronon encounters some old companions, they tell how they survived when Sateda fell. Samantha Carter, the new head of the Expedition, considers them a security risk and is reluctant to allow them access to Atlantis, forcing Ronon to choose whether to leave with his former allies. Unbeknownst to him, they harbor a dark secret as to how they really survived.
| 64 | 4 | "Doppelganger" | Robert C. Cooper | Robert C. Cooper | October 19, 2007 |
After coming across a crystalline species on M3X-387, similar to one which Jack O'Neill encountered in the SG-1 season 1 episode "Cold Lazarus", Sheppard inadvertently carries it back to Atlantis after contact with it. The being can travel through electrical conductors, and can enter the minds of humans through touch, where it causes nightmares - which eventually kills Dr. Kate Heightmeyer.
| 65 | 5 | "Travelers" | William Waring | Joseph Mallozzi & Paul Mullie | October 26, 2007 |
Sheppard is captured by a race of humans who have lived for generations in space to avoid any Wraith contact, and who have heard rumors of a powerful enemy against the Wraith: the Atlantis Expedition. Now they intend to use Sheppard to activate an Ancient warship.
| 66 | 6 | "Tabula Rasa" | Martin Wood | Alan McCullough | November 2, 2007 |
A deadly disease courses through Atlantis, causing the entire expedition to lose their memory. Teyla and Ronon have retained their memories and must convince everyone to work together to find a cure, before all their memories are gone forever.
| 67 | 7 | "Missing" | Andy Mikita | Carl Binder | November 9, 2007 |
While on an offworld trip to New Athos, Teyla and Dr. Jennifer Keller discover that the Athosian settlement has been abandoned in the wake of the arrival of the Bola Kai, primitive warriors who don't want them to get off the planet alive.
| 68 | 8 | "The Seer" | Andy Mikita | Alan McCullough | November 16, 2007 |
Searching for the missing Athosians, the team finds Davos, a man of a primitive civilization called the Vedeenans. Davos can see into the future and bears news about an attack on Atlantis. Meanwhile, the Replicators introduce a new tactic in their war with the Wraith: the extermination of their food supply. As human worlds come under attack, the Wraith warrior captured by Kolya a year ago, nicknamed 'Todd', proposes an alliance with Atlantis to shut down the Replicators' attack code.
| 69 | 9 | "Miller's Crossing" | Andy Mikita | Martin Gero | November 30, 2007 |
McKay's sister, Jeannie Miller, is kidnapped on Earth by industrialist Henry Wallace, who believes McKay can save his dying child using the Replicators’ alien nanotechnology. McKay goes to Jeannie's rescue, but is inadvertently captured. To save their own lives, the two of them must prevent Wallace's daughter's death -at the risk of setting the Replicator Nanites loose on Earth.
| 70 | 10 | "**This Mortal Coil**" | William Waring | Story by : Brad Wright and Joseph Mallozzi & Paul Mullie; Teleplay by : Joseph Mallozzi & Paul Mullie | December 7, 2007 |
When a mysterious drone collides with Atlantis, the team wonders whether the Replicators have found the city and if Davos' prediction of its destruction will come true. Events quickly suggest that the Replicators are already among them; yet things become even stranger when Elizabeth Weir reappears.
| 71 | 11 | "**Be All My Sins Remember'd**" | Andy Mikita | Martin Gero | January 4, 2008 |
Following the discovery of the location of all the Replicator ships in the galaxy, the Daedalus and the Apollo are sent to Atlantis to attack them. Attacks by the two battlecruisers and their new Asgard weapons force the Replicators to flee to their homeworld. McKay is able to come up with a plan to use a Replicator he has created to turn the other Replicators into a harmless mass. Needing more ships, the team and Todd work to recruit the Wraith to the battle, getting seven hive ships. Larrin of the Travelers arrives after the meeting and Sheppard is able to get her to add six more ships to the fleet, including the Travelers' Ancient warship. After modifying their plan due to input from McKay's Replicator, FRAN, the allied fleet attacks the Replicator homeworld. McKay's plan works, but the final phase, detonating the Replicator ZPMs to implode the mass, fails. Carter and McKay realize that the mass can be made to sink to the planet's core where the heat and pressure will implode it. As the surviving ships flee, the planet explodes and the Replicators are destroyed. However, a single Replicator warship is seen prowling the debris commanded by Doctor Elizabeth Weir who is pleased that they can finally get on with their plan without worrying about the other Replicators.
| 72 | 12 | "**Spoils of War**" | William Waring | Alan McCullough | January 11, 2008 |
Following the destruction of the Replicators, the team receives a signal from Todd's locator beacon and discovers it aboard a derelict hive ship. Bringing in Teyla to fly it, the team finds a map to a place that was vital to the Wraith's victory over the Ancients and fly the ship there. In the Wraith base, they discover new Wraith warriors are being incubated and rescue Todd who explains that the place is a cloning facility. Using captured ZPMs, the Wraith were able to use it clone massive numbers of themselves and defeat the Ancients with sheer numbers. Todd captured some ZPMs during the battle with the Replicators and hoped to use them to breed himself an army loyal only to him, but was betrayed. The team is captured while Todd escapes to the hive ship. Upon learning of their situation, Teyla uses her telepathic powers, boosted by her unborn child to take over the Wraith Queen's body and free her friends. The Queen nearly kills Teyla's unborn child so Sheppard quickly kills her at Teyla's urging. As the hive ship comes under attack by another, the team is forced to flee the facility as they are outnumbered. To keep the Wraith from using the facility again, Sheppard has Teyla crash their captured hive ship into it, destroying both. Todd is allowed to go free and the team returns to Atlantis where the situation makes Teyla finally understand why she can't go out on missions anymore and risk her baby.
| 73 | 13 | "Quarantine" | Martin Wood | Carl Binder | January 18, 2008 |
An imposed lockdown of Atlantis, caused by a medical alert, traps key personnel in various parts of the city alongside people they never expected, threatening some relationships within the expedition and allowing others to bloom.
| 74 | 14 | "Harmony" | William Waring | Martin Gero | January 25, 2008 |
Offworld on a familiar planet, Sheppard and McKay agree to escort a young princess, Harmony, to some ruins where she can assume the title of Queen. On this simple and routine mission, they find that a Genii contingent is hunting Harmony down, on the orders of her own sister, who wishes to succeed to the title in her place.
| 75 | 15 | "Outcast" | Andy Mikita | Teleplay by : Alan McCullough; Based upon an episode concept by : Joe Flanigan | February 1, 2008 |
When Sheppard's father dies, he and Ronon return to Earth to attend the funeral; but their plans are interrupted when they discover that a human-form Replicator is on the loose in San Francisco. Upon closer investigation, they learn it was created illegally by a scientist on Earth, who has programmed it to evade re-capture. Even more shocking is when it turns out the scientist's assistant is a Replicator herself, created to replace a deceased woman he was close to. Finally locating the Replicator with help from Sheppard's ex-wife and with the help of the second Replicator, Sheppard stabs the first one with a locator beacon, allowing the Apollo to beam it into low-Earth orbit where it burns up in the atmosphere. The second Replicator is deemed too dangerous to risk going free so her body is destroyed while her mind is uploaded to a virtual reality. In the end, Sheppard returns home to make amends with his estranged brother who welcomes his return.
| 76 | 16 | "Trio" | Martin Wood | Martin Gero | February 8, 2008 |
While offworld, Dr McKay, Dr Keller, and Col Carter become locked in a cavern, with no apparent means of escape. To while away the long hours, the three try to make the best of it, and attempt to get to know each other a little bit better.
| 77 | 17 | "Midway" | Andy Mikita | Carl Binder | February 15, 2008 |
At a request from Col Carter, Teal'c makes a journey to Atlantis to help out Ronon, who is up for review by the I.O.A. However, the two men experience great tension and Ronon refuses to listen to Teal'c's advice. As they prepare to depart from the Midway Station for Earth, the Wraith manage to capture the station and send through a strike force to Earth with Teal'c and Ronon following. Atlantis learns of this and sends a team to retake Midway. They succeed, but the incompetence of Doctor Peter Kavanaugh results in the station's self-destruct being activated. Unable to stop it, the surviving members of the Midway crew flee in an emergency Puddle Jumper as the station is destroyed. On Earth, Ronon and Teal'c manage to eliminate the Wraith who invaded Stargate Command and bond over the experience. With Teal'c's help, Ronon passes his review and returns to Atlantis aboard the Daedalus. A couple of weeks after the destruction of Midway, the Daedalus locates and rescues the survivors who are relieved to hear that Earth was saved.
| 78 | 18 | "**The Kindred**" | Peter F. Woeste | Joseph Mallozzi & Paul Mullie | February 22, 2008 |
| 79 | 19 | "**The Kindred**" | Martin Wood | Alan McCullough | February 29, 2008 |
Part 1: As a mysterious new illness begins to spread throughout the Pegasus Galaxy, Teyla is convinced that the father of her child is trying to communicate with her through telepathic visions concerning it. But when Dr. Keller discovers it to be a re-engineered form of the Hoffan virus (Poisoning the Well), which renders surviving humans poisonous to the Wraith, the team suspects that Michael is seeking revenge again. Meanwhile, Teyla follows her visions and is kidnapped by Michael who reveals his plan to take over the galaxy for himself with his new Wraith-Human hybrid species of which many Athosians, including Kanaan, her child's father have been turned into. The Hoffan virus is intended to weaken the Wraith and make them more vulnerable to attack. With the help of Todd, the team locates Michael's base but arrives too early and Michael is not there. Michael's ship engages the Daedalus which is hampered by the fact that it can't destroy the enemy ship without killing Teyla. Michael's ship ultimately flees the battle with Teyla still on board. To their shock, the team finds Doctor Carson Beckett, who has been dead for over a year, held prisoner inside Michael's base. Part 2: The team is stunned when Dr. Carson Beckett turns up alive. Testing and interrogation help them realize that its actually a clone of Doctor Beckett made from his memories and DNA when Michael briefly held the real Doctor Beckett captive. Michael had used the clone to discover the Hoffan virus and refine it and was keeping him alive with a special serum without which, the clone's body starts to deteriorate. Using information from the clone, the team captures one of Michael's men who Doctor Keller recognizes as Nabel, the man she and Teyla encountered on New Athos. After being promised protection in another galaxy, Nabel gives them the Stargate address of Michael's base. At the base, Michael reveals that he plans to use Teyla's baby to perfect his hybrids and has the Athosians held prisoner. Teyla tries to convince Kanaan to help her escape, but fails when Michael returns. As the team attacks the base to rescue Teyla, Michael kills his experiments and prepares to flee the planet again with Teyla. The team rescues the Athosians and Beckett rescues a shocked Teyla. However, when Michael shows up, he is able to prevent Beckett from shooting him and flees again in his ship with Teyla. Due to Beckett's condition, they are forced to put him into stasis until they can find a cure.
| 80 | 20 | "**The Last Man**" | Martin Wood | Joseph Mallozzi & Paul Mullie | March 7, 2008 |
When Sheppard returns from searching for Teyla, he finds that Atlantis has been abandoned. The city is surrounded by a vast wasteland of sand dunes instead of the ocean it is supposed to be. Sheppard is eventually contacted by a hologram of a much older McKay who explains that a freak accident flung Sheppard 48,000 years into the future. Without Sheppard, the situation degenerated quickly in the Pegasus galaxy and while they eventually did find Teyla, she was already dead. Michael then perfected his hybrids and destroyed the Wraith. Ronon left Atlantis to fight him alone and died destroying one of his labs with Todd's help. Carter ran a guerilla campaign against Michael with a new ship, the Phoenix, but died when her ship was destroyed in battle, taking out three of Michael's wraith ships in a Kamikaze run. Afterwards, Richard Woolsey took over Atlantis and pulled back from helping the rest of the galaxy, causing McKay and Keller to leave and return to Earth. They fell in love, but Keller eventually died from complications from the Hoffan virus and McKay dedicated his life to finding a way to bring Sheppard back to change history. After 25 years, he succeeded and managed to get now-Major General Evan Lorne to let him go back to Atlantis to implement his plan. After explaining everything to Sheppard, McKay puts him into stasis until such time as conditions are right to allow him to return to his own time. Thanks to McKay's efforts, Sheppard returns to the present 12 days after he left with Teyla's location. Sheppard leads a team to Michael's base, but they find that they have arrived too early and set off a booby trap, causing the building to collapse on top of them.

== Production ==
With the season premier, "Adrift", Amanda Tapping replaces Torri Higginson in the opening credits sequence, with Paul McGillion no longer appearing. This marks Amanda Tapping's first appearance as a main character on Atlantis. It also marks the only time an actor has appeared in the opening credits of both Stargate SG-1 and Atlantis. Christopher Judge has a cameo appearance as his Stargate SG-1 character Teal'c in "Reunion" and guest stars in the episode "Midway". Judge is the last original Stargate SG-1 regular to appear on Atlantis, as the other three characters in the original SG-1 team all appeared in Atlantis's first season, as did other SG-1 characters Hank Landry and George Hammond. Of the three other SG-1 regulars (namely Cam Mitchell, Vala Mal Doran and Jonas Quinn), Mitchell and Vala visited Atlantis in the SG-1 crossover episode "The Pegasus Project". Jodelle Ferland, who plays Princess Harmony in the episode "Harmony", previously appeared in the episode "Flesh and Blood" in Stargate SG-1 season 10 as a young Adria; and Crystal Lowe previously appeared in the episode "Emancipation" in season 1 of Stargate SG-1, and Cassie Winslow and Christopher Orr and Connor Trinneer both reprising as Pitt Henderson and Michael Kenmore respectively.

== Release and reception ==
In September 2007, unfinished versions of "Adrift" and "Lifeline" were leaked onto the internet. Shortly after, fans who used iTunes to download "Adrift" discovered that they had in fact purchased "Doppelganger" instead, three weeks before it was set to premiere on Sci Fi Channel in the USA. The mix-up probably comes from the fact that "Doppelganger" was the first episode of the season to be filmed, and thus carries an internal production number of 401 at the studio. Late in the season, "Midway" was another episode that was mistakenly released by iTunes several days before its airdate. "Be All My Sins Remember'd" received a rating of 1.4 million viewers, the highest rated episode in the fourth season. It was also the US Sci-fi Channel's 2nd highest rated show that week: the 1st was an SF TV-movie, "Beyond Loch Ness" (which had a rating of 1.7 million), which happened to star Atlantis actor Paul McGillion and SG-1's Don S. Davis. Stargate Atlantis, Season 4, has been aired on the following channels: Sci-Fi Channel in the USA, TV6 in Sweden, and Sky 1 in the UK.

"Adrift" earned an Emmy nomination for "Outstanding Special Visual Effects For A Series", and "Best Visual Effects" for a Gemini Award. Jewel Staite has been nominated for a Gemini Award in the category of Best Performance by an Actress in a Continuing Leading Dramatic Role for her performance in "Missing". Alan McCullough has been nominated for a Gemini Award in the Best Writing in a Dramatic Series category for his episode "Tabula Rasa". "The Last Man" has been nominated for a Gemini in the Best Achievement in Make-Up category.

== DVD releases ==
| DVD name | Region 1 | Region 2 | Region 4 |
|---|---|---|---|
| Stargate Atlantis Season 4 | July 8, 2008 | August 4, 2008 | September 3, 2008 |
| Season 4: Volume 1 | — | June 2, 2008 | — |
| Season 4: Volume 2 | — | June 16, 2008 | — |
| Season 4: Volume 3 | — | June 30, 2008 | — |
| Season 4: Volume 4 | — | July 14, 2008 | — |
| Season 4: Volume 5 | — | July 28, 2008 | — |
