= The Daedalus Variations =

- Stargate Atlantis episode
- An alternate Daedalus jumps to an alternate reality.
- Episode no.: Season 5 Episode 4
- Directed by: Andy Mikita
- Written by: Alan McCullough
- Production code: 504
- Original air date: August 1, 2008

Guest appearances
- David Nykl as Radek Zelenka; Kavan Smith as Evan Lorne; Chuck Campbell as Chuck; Tracy Waterhouse as Sobel; Annalise MacCulloch as Torren John Emmagan

Episode chronology
← Previous "Broken Ties"	Next → "Ghost in the Machine"
- Stargate Atlantis (season 5)

"The Daedalus Variations" is the 84th episode of the science fiction television series Stargate Atlantis, and is the fourth episode in the series' fifth season. The episode first aired on August 1, 2008 on the Sci Fi Channel in the United States, and subsequently aired on October 9 on Sky One in the United Kingdom. The episode was written by Alan McCullough, and directed by regular Stargate director, Andy Mikita. Richard Woolsey (Robert Picardo) and Jennifer Keller (Jewel Staite) do not appear in the episode, despite being credited during the opening title sequence. Talking to journalists, McCullough linked the story to that of the Flying Dutchman, a mythical ghost ship that drifts forever in the ocean with no chance of returning home. The episode received generally favourable reviews.

Episode writer McCullough described the episode as a one-off "wild romp", with much use of visual effects. The episode follows John Sheppard and his team, who investigates the mysterious appearance of the Daedalus over Atlantis, where they soon find the ship is from a parallel universe and makes its way through various alternate realities with an "alternate reality drive". Stuck on the Daedalus, the team seeks to find a way to return, while they run into contact with a newly introduced alien race and find the ship's new drive is slowly burning out, and they could be stranded in another universe forever.

== Plot ==
A spaceship appears out of nowhere over Atlantis. John Sheppard (Joe Flanigan) and his team discover that the ship is the Daedalus, which is strange as Stargate Command confirms that the Daedalus is actually two days away from Earth. Sheppard's team boards the new Daedalus and find it apparently abandoned with signs of battle damage. Teyla (Rachel Luttrell) views a log entry from the Daedalus commander, Colonel Sobel, who the team has never heard of before. Suddenly, there is a power spike and the Daedalus disappears from above Atlantis, while from the perspective of Sheppard's team, Atlantis disappears. McKay finds that they have been propelled into a parallel universe by what he terms an "alternate reality drive", and thus the Daedalus is actually from an alternate reality.

The team finds another version of themselves, dead, who come from yet another parallel universe and were trapped aboard while investigating the ship, just as they are. Soon, the ship jumps again, into a reality where Atlantis is under attack from an unfamiliar alien ship. Sheppard intervenes, and the aliens retaliate by launching fighters. One of the fighters crashes into the Daedalus before it jumps again, this time into a universe where Atlantis' sun has already swelled into a red giant. To keep the ship from being burned up, McKay (David Hewlett) increases the rate at which the alternate reality drive activates, warning that his modifications are irreversible. Meanwhile, the team must contend with aliens from the crashed fighter. McKay figures out that there is no way to guide the alternate reality drive, but that they can return to their original reality by reversing the drive and jumping back through the realities they had visited before. They use the maneuvering thrusters to stabilize the ship's orbit above the red giant, and weather another attack by the aliens, with help from an alternate Atlantis. Once they return to their own reality, they leave the ship in space suits after a remaining alien detonates an explosive, causing a breach in the ship's hull and are picked up by Lorne (Kavan Smith) after the Daedalus disappears. In the end, McKay is shown working on fixing the alternate reality drive, despite Sheppard's admonishments.

== Production ==
The original concept of an episode involving alternate realities was a room in Atlantis that shifts into alternate realities. However, the idea had several issues, including the possibility of no Atlantis in one reality, so Robert C. Cooper suggested using the Daedalus. The final draft of "The Daedalus Variations" was completed on February 11. On February 12, the prosthetics meeting for the episode, as well as "The Seed", "Broken Ties" and "Whispers" took place, which most likely involved the unknown aliens featured from the episode. The appearance of the aliens was revealed in the advertisement for the episode on July 27. In an interview with episode writer, Alan McCullough, he described the episode as a "great team show", and a "visual effects spectacular." On March 10, Captain Sobol was cast. Sobol was the alternate commander of the Daedalus, rather than Colonel Caldwell (Mitch Pileggi). By the time the episode aired, Sobol was female (portrayed by Tracy Waterhouse), she held the rank of Colonel instead, and her name was spelled "Sobel".

Much of the episode was filmed on the Daedalus set. Due to that, visual effects were required to fill in the external shots. The episode was reportedly one of the most expensive VFX budgets in the series, and is the most expensive for the season. The star map behind the captain's chair of the Daedalus is usually lit green. However, the episode's writer and supervising producer, Alan McCullough, deliberately turned the map 90 degrees and changed the color from green to orange, so as to make the ship different from the normal Daedalus. McCullough also stated that the episode is a one-off, but did not rule out a return beyond the fifth season. He also said that he originally planned the team to visit a reality where the Ancients won the war against the Wraith, but this idea was dropped as it would detract from the main storyline. The episode was Jason Momoa's first appearance with his customised wig. Although he had his hair cut by the time the fourth season was completed, for the first three episodes of Season Five, he had his dreadlocks sewn back on. However, when SCI FI wouldn't allow his hairstyle to be changed, they switched to the wig after Momoa complained about the pain of having his hair sewn on again.

== Reception ==
"The Daedalus Variations" was given a household rating of 1.3, making Stargate Atlantis the fourth most viewed series for the week on Sci Fi Channel. They were beaten by ECW on Sci Fi (with 1.4), Ghost Hunters International (with 1.6) and the season three premiere of Eureka (which earned the highest rating of 2.1). The episode was also received generally positive. Tory Ireland Mell of IGN praised the episode for its reasonably short teaser, thinking the shorter it is, the better the episode, as well as its gripping storyline and the introduction of the alien race, particularly the fact that very little is known about them, stating it was "a perfect tease by the writers." The episode was rated 9.1 out of 10 overall. Marx Pyle of SyFy Portal compared the episode as Atlantis' version of Star Trek: The Next Generation episode "Q Who?" in respect to the introduction of a new "big bad" for the future. It was praised for being a "fun filler" episode, and Pyle enjoyed the scene where the two Sheppards converse, and the space battle, believing only Battlestar Galactica could beat them. However, Pyle criticised the episode for the absence of Woolsey, and McKay's apparent quick understanding of new technologies including the alternate reality drive, as well as feeling that Sci Fi gave away too much information from the previews of the episode.
