= Carl Binder =

Canadian writer and television producer (born 1960)

- Born: 10 August 1960 (age 66); Windsor, Ontario, Canada
- Occupations: Screenwriter; Television Producer

Carl Binder (born August 10, 1960) is a Canadian screenwriter and television producer. He is most noted for his contributions to the Stargate SG-1 and Stargate Atlantis series as well as Dr. Quinn, Medicine Woman and Little Men.

Binder currently resides in Vancouver, British Columbia.

== Early life and education ==
Binder was born in Windsor, Ontario, on 10 August 1960. He relocated to California in his early twenties and entered the entertainment industry as a production assistant before receiving his first produced credit on the NBC sitcom Punky Brewster, scripting the 1985 episode “Christmas Shoplifting.”

== Career ==
Binder has worked extensively in television since the mid-1980s. Binder’s breakthrough in feature writing came when Walt Disney Feature Animation hired him, together with Susannah Grant and Philip LaZebnik, to write the screenplay for Pocahontas. The film became a worldwide box-office success and won two Academy Awards.

He then moved back to television, spending four seasons as writer–producer on the CBS period drama Dr. Quinn, Medicine Woman, where he also directed three episodes.

In 1998 Binder created and executive-produced Little Men, an hour-long family series adapted from Louisa May Alcott’s novel and shot in Ontario.

Binder was set to co-write the third Stargate SG-1 movie with Brad Wright and served as an executive producer for the Stargate series Stargate Universe. More recently, he worked on Transporter: The Series, and Houdini and Doyle.

In 2018 he co-wrote two episodes of Unspeakable, an eight-part miniseries for CBC Television and SundanceTV that dramatised Canada’s tainted-blood scandal.

=== Trivia ===
In the Stargate Atlantis episode 5x16, a hall in a secret scientific facility was called "Carl Binder Memorial Theater".

== Filmography ==
=== Film ===
- Pocahontas (1995) – co-screenwriter

=== Television ===
- Punky Brewster (1985) – writer, episode “Christmas Shoplifting”
- Dr. Quinn, Medicine Woman (1995–1998) – writer, producer, director
- Little Men (1998–1999) – creator, executive producer
- Transporter: The Series (2013–2014) – writer
- Houdini & Doyle (2016) – consulting producer, writer
- Unspeakable (2019) – writer

=== List of Stargate episodes written by Binder ===
==== Stargate SG-1 ====
Title	Season	Notes	Directed by
"Demons"	3	None	Peter DeLuise
"200"	10	Written with Brad Wright & Robert C. Cooper & Joseph Mallozzi & Paul Mullie & Martin Gero & Alan McCullough	Martin Wood

==== Stargate Atlantis ====
Title	Season	Notes	Directed by
"Before I Sleep"	1	None	Andy Mikita
"Letters From Pegasus"	1	None	Mario Azzopardi
"Condemned"	2	Teleplay (Story by Sean Carley)	Peter DeLuise
"Aurora"	2	Teleplay (Story by Binder & Brad Wright)	Martin Wood
"The Hive"	2	None	Martin Wood
"Critical Mass"	2	Teleplay (Story by Binder & Brad Wright)	Andy Mikita
"Michael"	2	None	Martin Wood
"Inferno"	2	None	Peter DeLuise
"Irresistible"	3	Teleplay (Story by Brad Wright & Robert C. Cooper)	Martin Wood
"Progeny"	3	None	Andy Mikita
"The Real World"	3	None	Paul Ziller
"McKay and Mrs. Miller"	3	Written with Martin Gero	Martin Wood
"Phantoms"	3	None	Martin Wood
"Echoes"	3	Written with Brad Wright	Will Waring
"The Game"	3	Written with Don Whitehead & Holly Henderson	Will Waring
"Vengeance"	3	None	Andy Mikita
"Lifeline"	4	None	Martin Wood
"Missing"	4	None	Andy Mikita
"Quarantine"	4	None	Andy Mikita
"Outcast"	4	Teleplay (Story by Binder & Joe Flanigan)	Andy Mikita
"Midway"	4	None	Andy Mikita
"Ghost in the Machine"	5	None	Ken Girotti
"Tracker"	5	None	Will Waring
"The Prodigal"	5	None	Andy Mikita
"Identity"	5	None	Will Waring

==== Stargate Universe ====
Title	Season	Notes	Directed by
"Water"	1	with Brad Wright and Robert C. Cooper	Will Waring
"Life"	1	None	Alex Chapple
"Pain"	1	None	Will Waring
"Pathogen"	2	None	Robert Carlyle
"Hope"	2	None	Will Waring
