= Sharon Taylor =

Canadian actress (born 1981)

- Taylor in 2026
- Born: June 5, 1981 (age 45); Vancouver, British Columbia, Canada
- Occupation: Actress
- Years active: 2006–present

Sharon Taylor (born June 5, 1981) is a Canadian actress.

== Biography ==
Sharon Taylor was born and raised in Vancouver, British Columbia, Canada. She received her Bachelor of Fine Arts degree in theatre from Simon Fraser University. She worked extensively in theatre for many years before switching to television and film. She has trained in martial arts since her twenties, and has a second degree black belt in both karate and kickboxing. Upon learning that Sharon was a black belt kickboxer, the producers of Stargate: Atlantis decided to write it into her character's actions in the episode "The Prodigal". Taylor is also trained in Jiu-Jitsu and Muay Thai.

== Filmography ==
=== Film ===
Year	Title	Role	Notes
2008	Alice & Huck	Tara	Short film
2014	Second Dates	Karen	Short film
2015	12 Rounds 3: Lockdown	Carmen	
2017	Drone	Agent Jenkins	
2022	Rescued by Ruby	Sam	
2025	Sniper: The Last Stand	Hera	

=== Television ===
Year	Title	Role	Notes
2006	To Have and to Hold	Sally	Television film
2007	Eureka	Stark's Doctor	Episode: "Phoenix Rising"
2007	Eureka	Townsperson	Episode: "Games People Play"
2007	Stargate Atlantis	Replicator Technician	Episode: "Lifeline"
2008–09	Stargate Atlantis	Amelia Banks	Recurring role 11 episodes
2009–10	Smallville	Faora	Recurring role 7 episodes
2010	Supernatural	Crossroads Demon	Episode: "Weekend at Bobby's"
2010–11	Riese: Kingdom Falling	Empress Amara	Main role 8 episodes
2010	Ice Quake	Jamie	Television film
2011	Hell on Wheels	Squaw	Episode: "Pride, Pomp and Circumstance"
2012	Midnight Sun	Akira Yachak	Unaired Pilot
2012	The Pregnancy Project	Karen	Television film
2012	Psych	Jasmine Richards	Episode: "True Grits"
2012	Supernatural	Female Leviathan	1 episode: "Blood Brother"
2012	Level Up	Grinella	Episode: "Should She Stay or Should She Go?"
2013	Fringe	Boyles' Secretary Carol	Episode: "An Enemy of Fate"
2014	Soldiers of Earth	Mrs. Hutter	Pilot
2014	The 100	Council Member #2	4 episodes
2014	Spooksville	Dr. Eck	1 episode: "Critical Care"
2014	Once Upon a Time	Witch of the East	Episode: "Kansas"
2014	Continuum	Pangea	Episode: "Waning Minutes"
2014	Motive	Sandra Vaughn	Episode: "Pitfall"
2015	Asteroid: Final Impact	Agent Jenkins	Television film
2015	A Mother's Instinct	Detective Jenkins	Television film
2016	Legends of Tomorrow	Rebel Leader	Episode: "Leviathan"
2016	I Didn't Kill My Sister	Detective Cruz	Television film
2016	Aftermath	Jane	3 episodes
2017	Bellevue	Virginia Panamick	Main role 8 Episodes
2017	Ghost Wars	Sophia Moon	Main role 8 Episodes
2018	Riverdale	Tia Margot	Episode: "The Wicked and The Divine"
2018	The X-Files	Diana Eggers	Episode: "Familiar"
2018	Bad Blood	Rose Sunwind	Main role
2019	See	Ilun	Episode: "Godflame" (Pilot)
2019	Supernatural	Ardat	Episode: "The Rupture"
2020	Altered Carbon	Myka	8 Episodes
2021	Batwoman	Mayor Hartley	Episode: "Mad As a Hatter"
2024	Cross	Lieutenant Oracene Massey	8 Episodes
2026	Elle	Robin Walker	2 Episodes
