= Will Waring =

Camera operator and director

William Michael "Will" Waring is a camera operator and director, primarily for Stargate SG-1 and Stargate Atlantis. He attended the Film Production course at the Theatre department of the University of British Columbia, where he developed the "WillyCam", a mechanical camera stabilisation device.

His signature as a camera operator and director is to subtly include a pineapple in scenes.

Waring also worked as a camera operator on the film, "A Dog's Breakfast" which served as the directorial debut for British-born Canadian actor, David Hewlett.

== Filmography ==
=== Director ===
- Travelers (multiple episodes, 2016- )
- Echoes (2012 pilot; not yet picked up)
- Stargate Universe (3 episodes, 2009)
- Stargate Atlantis (15 episodes, 2006–2008)
- Stargate SG-1 (13 episodes, 2002–2007)
- Painkiller Jane (1 episode, 2007)
