= Ronon Dex =

Fictional character in Stargate Atlantis

- Jason Momoa as Ronon Dex
- First appearance: Runner
- Portrayed by: Jason Momoa

In-universe information
- Species: Human from Sateda
- Occupation: Soldier

Ronon Dex is a fictional character in the science fiction television series Stargate Atlantis, played by Jason Momoa.

== Role in Stargate Atlantis ==
Ronon is a native of Sateda, a planet with an advanced level of technology. His grandfather suffered from Second Childhood, a condition with symptoms similar to Alzheimer's disease. Ronon became a member of the Satedan military and held the rank of Specialist. He was very close to a woman named Melena, whom Ronon considered "close enough" to a wife in "Sunday". Approximately seven years before Ronon's first contact with the Atlantis Expedition, the Wraith attacked Sateda. Ronon remained behind with Melena to fight the Wraith, but the Wraith defeated Satedan forces and Melena was killed before Ronon's eyes in an explosion. Ronon was later captured by the Wraith. When the Wraith discovered that he was much stronger and more resilient than the normal human on Sateda (or any other human civilisation in Pegasus), they turned him into a Runner, implanting a tracking device in his upper back and setting him loose to be constantly hunted. (for sports, training etc. as Ronon said later to Teyla).

Ronon stayed alive for seven years by learning several new tricks and deciding to hunt the Wraith with his weapons. He owns a rare energy pistol which emits red bursts of energy that stun or kill at the user's discretion. It resembles a revolver with a power cell where the ammunition cylinder would be located. The same type of weapon is shown to be used by a people in the Season 4 episode 'Travelers,' but Ronon displays no knowledge of these people. Ronon also carries a sword, with the hilt made from a Wraith mandible and humerus wrapped in Wraith hair, the blade made from the metal of a Wraith ship, and the scabbard made from a Wraith leather coat. The episode "The Hive" shows Ronon carrying several knives hidden on his person for use in emergencies. (He uses four in the episode and it is implied there may be more.) Ronon's seemingly unlimited supply of these blades is a source of occasional comic relief.

When the Atlantis team encounters Ronon for the first time in season 2's "Runner", they arrange the removal of the tracking device in his back. Ronon returns with them to Atlantis, where he learns that Sateda had been completely destroyed. Sheppard offers Ronon a place on his team in "Duet" after Ronon proves his worth against the Marines and Teyla in hand-to-hand combat and demonstrates his experience with guns. Ronon finds out in "Trinity" that about 300 Satedans survived the Wraith attacks and moved to other planets. In season 3's "Sateda", Ronon gets revenge on the Wraith who originally turned him into a Runner. Ronon meets with three of his old Satedan friends in season 4's "Reunion" and seriously considers leaving the Atlantis Expedition for the first time until he learns that his old friends are Wraith Worshippers. In the end, Ronon remains with the Atlantis Expedition, stating that his friends are "right here".

In season 4's "Midway", Teal'c comes to Atlantis to advise Ronon on how to deal with the IOA. This immediately provokes a rivalry, and Ronon and Teal'c engage in a sparring match. After an hour of intense but inconclusive fighting, it is proven they are equally matched. Together, they fight a group of Wraith who attempt to gate to Earth; in the process, Dex saves Teal'c from a Wraith who is feeding on him and earns IOA approval of his presence at Atlantis. (The rivalry as such is resolved; the question of who could beat whom is left open, but they become friends instead of rivals.) In one episode of season 4, Ronon and Dr. Jennifer Keller appears to take a romantic interest in each other. In Season 5 episodes "Taken," "First Contact," and "The Lost Tribe," their potential attraction is again suggested until Dr. Keller reveals that she is interested in Dr. Rodney McKay. In season 5's final episode, "Enemy at the Gate", Ronon is killed during an assault on a Wraith hive that had reached Earth's orbit. He is then revived by a Wraith and interrogated, only to be rescued by Sheppard and crew. Dex is last seen with the Atlantis Expedition crew as they safely land a cloaked but disabled Atlantis near the Golden Gate Bridge.

== Conceptual history ==
The working name for Ronon's homeworld planet was Atteria, not Sateda.

After Momoa was cast in the role, the Sci Fi Channel objected to him keeping his long, heavy 6-pound dreadlocks. However, the hair soon became a signature of the character, and when Momoa decided to cut them off (with the producers' permission) after the completion of Season 4, he was still required to have his hair sewn back on for at least the first three episodes until there would be a scene where Ronon cuts his hair off in "Broken Ties". According to Momoa, it took nine hours to sew his hair back on for the beginning of the fifth season. However, wearing it was too painful for him to continue working. Meanwhile, the Sci-Fi Channel overruled the decision for Ronon to lose his hair. The scene had already been filmed and was cut, so he was eventually given a custom-made $10,000 wig that weighed the same as Momoa's former hair as a replacement for the rest of the season. In interviews, Momoa says that the wig was more painful and cumbersome than his original dreadlocks. Also, Momoa used various tricks to cover up several of his tattoos, including the sizeable tribal tattoo on his left forearm. Eventually, the writers incorporated a scene in the episode "Reunion" wherein he gets the tattoo.

When Valerie Halverson took over as the lead costume designer in the fourth season, Jason Momoa would bring her pieces of fabric from flea markets. The costume department would then fashion them into clothing for his character.
