= Jennifer Keller =

- Jewel Staite as Jennifer Keller
- First appearance: "First Strike" (Atlantis)
- Last appearance: "Enemy at the Gate" (Atlantis)
- Created by: Martin Gero
- Portrayed by: Jewel Staite

In-universe information
- Species: Human
- Title: Doctor
- Occupation: Medical doctor, Chief Medical Officer of the Atlantis Expedition
- Family: mother (deceased) father (alive)
- Nationality: American

Dr. Jennifer Keller is a fictional character from the Canadian-American military science fiction series Stargate Atlantis, a spin-off series to Stargate SG-1. She is played by Canadian actress Jewel Staite, who previously played the Wraith Ellia in season two episode "Instinct". She was created by the producers, who wanted someone to fill in for Carson Beckett after Paul McGillion's departure from regular status in the series. Keller had a recurring role in the fourth season, and was later promoted to a regular in Season 5.

Dr. Keller was introduced in the third season finale, "First Strike". She is a brilliant young doctor and becomes a member of the Atlantis Expedition, and has taken charge as Atlantis' Chief Medical Officer, after the death of Dr. Carson Beckett. At first, she appears as a non-assertive character, but has proven to be courageous over time. Towards the end of the fifth season, she starts a relationship with fellow expedition member Rodney McKay. In 2008, Staite was nominated for a Gemini Award in "Best Performance by an Actress in a Continuing Leading Dramatic Role" for her role as Keller, and in 2009, she was also nominated for a Leo Award in "Best Lead Performance by a Female in a Dramatic Series."

== Role in Stargate Atlantis ==
=== Character arc ===
Dr. Keller was born and raised in Chippewa Falls, Wisconsin. A few years before joining the Atlantis Expedition her mother dies and she becomes all her father has left. She has vertigo. During her schooling years, she is three years ahead of her class, having graduated high school at the age of 15 and earns a bachelor's degree before she becomes 18. She is then trained to be a doctor, where she soon becomes Atlantis' Chief Medical Officer, with some reluctance, after the death of former Chief Medical Officer Dr. Carson Beckett. She also says that she is no Carson, but Dr. Weir assures her she will do just fine. One of her first duties is to try and save Dr Weir's life, after she is critically injured due to the Asuran beam grazing the tower before the city can escape from the Asurans. She talks with McKay and tells him that he could save her life with Replicator nanites that once infected her.

She is one of many people affected by nightmares in Atlantis after Colonel John Sheppard touches a crystal life form that invades people's nightmares. In hers, she dreams that Teyla Emmagan suffers severe abdominal pain and dies when an alien insect bursts out of her stomach. She and Teyla both went to New Athos on a medical check up. After discovering the Athosians were missing, she helps Teyla through the night, and even overcomes some of her fears and drawbacks from her early years, after injuring Nabel, who is later revealed to have worked for Michael. When she gets back to Atlantis, she is the one who discovers that Teyla is pregnant. After finding the clone of Beckett, she realises that Michael made an injection to keep his cells from deteriorating. When she is unable to find a band-aid measure, she places him in stasis to give her and a team enough time to solve the problem. Two months later, she was able to wake up Beckett's clone from the stasis pod, after she found the solution from Michael's database from M2S-445. Unfortunately, she is exposed to a compound that would turn her into a Hive Ship, and threatened the base. Cloned Beckett is able to find a cure and stops the process before the IOA considers killing her. Later on, she finds a gene therapy from Michael's database that would eliminate the Wraith's dependence on feeding on humans.

=== Love triangle ===
She develops a romantic interest in Ronon - an interest that appears to be mutual - while the two are locked in the Infirmary during a malfunction of Atlantis' automated lockdown procedures. They almost kissed until the lockdown ended. She later appears to have some romantic interest or maybe only fondness regarding McKay, who saves her life when trapped in an abandoned Genii mine with him and Carter. In an alternate timeline, she develops a romantic interest in McKay after they both leave the Atlantis Project, although later in this time line she dies from complications which are caused by repeated exposure to the Hoffan Drug which causes Rodney to set out to correct the error and send Sheppard back to his timeline which essentially destroys the alternate timeline. In the proper timeline, McKay admits to her that he loves her, and has for some time. Ronon also reveals a romantic interest in Keller. However, when Dr. Keller realizes his intentions, she tells Ronon that she is interested in someone else. Later on a trip back to Earth, McKay and Dr. Keller are among the people locked down in a facility while they are on a date together. After McKay revives her from a hypothermic shock, McKay and Dr. Keller share a passionate kiss. Then Dr. Keller openly professes her love for McKay and says that she has "loved him for some time now".

== Conceptual history ==
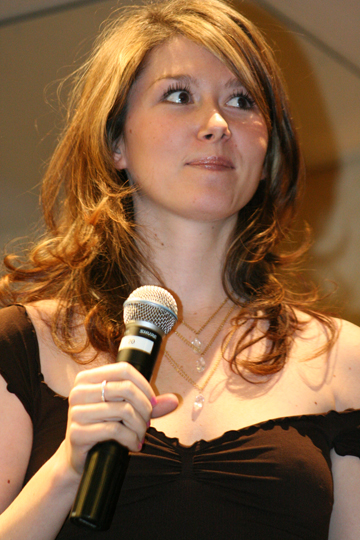
Jewel Staite in the 2005 Serenity convention.

Jewel Staite, who plays Dr. Keller, previously played Ellia in the Stargate Atlantis episode "Instinct". Staite was well known among sci-fi fans for playing Kaylee Frye in the cult series Firefly, and is the third regular Firefly actor to go on to appear in the Stargate franchise. The others were Adam Baldwin (Jayne Cobb in Firefly) who played Colonel Dave Dixon, and Morena Baccarin (Inara Serra in Firefly) who played Adria.

Executive producer Martin Gero created the character of Jennifer Keller while writing "First Strike". The producers decided to cast Jewel Staite for the role as Keller after they enjoyed working with her previously as Ellia in "Instinct". After Paul McGillion departed from the series as Carson Beckett, Gero wanted Keller not to replace Beckett, but rather fill in for him. Gero also wanted to make Keller's situation endearing if she was uncomfortable in her new position, and didn't want it in the first place. She was also originally created to be a Canadian character, and while filming the episode, she held a Canadian flag patch. However, because Paul Mullie thought there were already enough Canadian characters in the series (which include Rodney McKay and Chuck), she was turned into an American instead, after filming was completed, so the visual effects team wiped away the Canadian flag and replaced it with a CGI flag of the US.

She was given a recurring status for the fourth season, though the number of episodes she would appear in varied. In October 2006, it was revealed that she would appear in 13 to 15 episodes. However, by February 2007, it was revealed she would appear in eight episodes. By the time the season aired, she appeared in eleven episodes in total. She was promoted to a regular for the fifth season. Reportedly, Staite was eager for her new role as a regular. One of her first roles for the fifth season was "The Seed", where Staite had to be up at 4:00am for an extensive three to four hours with prosthetics.

== Reception ==
For her role as Dr. Keller in the episode "Missing", Staite was nominated for "Best Performance by an Actress in a Continuing Leading Dramatic Role" for the 23rd annual Gemini Awards, 2008. However, she lost to Helene Joy from her role in Durham County. Staite's acting for the season five episode "Tracker" was also nominated for the "Best Lead Performance by a Female in a Dramatic Series" for the 2009 Leo Awards.
