= Stargate Universe =

2009 American-Canadian science fiction TV series

- Genre: Military science fiction
- Created by: Brad Wright; Robert C. Cooper
- Based on: Stargate by Roland Emmerich; Dean Devlin
- Starring: Robert Carlyle; Louis Ferreira; Brian J. Smith; Elyse Levesque; David Blue; Alaina Huffman; Jamil Walker Smith; Ming-Na Wen
- Theme music composer: Joel Goldsmith
- Countries of origin: Canada; United States
- Original language: English
- No. of seasons: 2
- No. of episodes: 40 (Episodes); 34 (Webisodes) (list of episodes)

Production
- Executive producers: Brad Wright; Robert C. Cooper; Carl Binder
- Editor: Mike Banas
- Running time: 43 minutes
- Production companies: Acme Shark Productions; MGM Television

Original release
- Network: Syfy
- Release: October 2, 2009 – May 9, 2011

Related
- Stargate; Stargate SG-1; Stargate Atlantis; Stargate Origins

Stargate Universe (abbreviated as SGU) is a military science fiction drama television series and part of MGM's Stargate franchise. It follows the adventures of a present-day, multinational exploration team traveling on the Ancient spaceship Destiny several billion light years distant from the Milky Way Galaxy. The team tries to figure out a way to return to Earth, while simultaneously trying to explore and to survive in their unknown area of the universe. The series featured an ensemble cast and was primarily filmed in and around Vancouver, British Columbia, Canada.

Created by Brad Wright and Robert C. Cooper, Stargate Universe premiered in the United States on Syfy on October 2, 2009. A second season began on September 28, 2010, ending on March 7, 2011. Syfy announced on December 16, 2010, that it would not be picking up Stargate Universe for a third season.

The second season of SGU ended on a semi-cliffhanger. A comic book series set after the end of season 2 was published, but the original creators and writers were not involved.

== Premise ==
Stargate Command (SGC) created Icarus base on a remote planet whose Stargate is powered by large naquadria deposits throughout the core. The team, led by Dr. Nicholas Rush, postulate that the power from that core could allow them to use a 9-chevron address to "dial" into the Stargate, allowing them access to locations far remote from their galaxy, but lack the means to translate the writing of the Ancients to understand how to dial this properly. Dr. Rush designs a video game used across Earth to find brilliant minds to interpret the puzzle, which Eli Wallace, a young mathematics genius, is able to solve. Although Eli is reluctant, he is brought to the Icarus base along with a contingent of guests of honor aboard the Hammond, a Daedalus-class starship battlecruiser; the guests include Senator Armstrong, who funds Icarus Project, and his daughter Chloe. They are introduced to the base's military staff, led by Colonel Everett Young, Colonel David Telford, First Lieutenants Matthew Scott and Tamara Johansen, and Master Sergeant Ronald Greer.

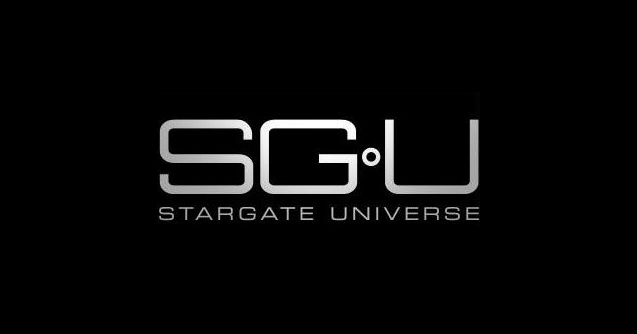
Title card

Dr. Rush and Eli work together to discover the means to dial the ninth chevron, just as the base is attacked by members of the Lucian Alliance. Colonel Telford aids in the defense with F-302 fighters with Colonel Samantha Carter in command of the George Hammond, while the base starts dialing Earth into the Stargate, finding that the planet's power core is about to explode. Dr. Rush realizes that the explosion would follow them through the base back to Earth, and instead redials the Stargate with the ninth chevron, successfully opening a wormhole. The surviving Icarus Base members flee through the wormhole before the planet explodes. They find themselves aboard an old abandoned spacecraft made by the Ancients, which Dr. Rush finds was named Destiny. Around eighty survivors begin to assure the safety of their team. Senator Armstrong, injured and realizing he might not have long, sacrifices himself to seal an air leak in one of Destiny's shuttles.

As the rest of the team works to make the ship habitable, Dr. Rush, Eli, and other scientific members of Icarus Base start to understand the function of Destiny; they are not able to control the ship directly and find that it will drop out of faster-than-light travel to allow its Stargate to connect to a number of nearby worlds for a fixed period of time before it continues; it fuels itself by diving into the outermost layer of a nearby star and collecting energy from it; the first time the Destiny did that, the crew feared the worst until they understood why it happened. The crew is able to remain in contact with Earth via the Ancient communication stones that Dr. Rush brought and are told to continue the Stargate mission of exploring that galaxy while searching for a way to return home.

The team's mission adapts in season 2, when the Ancients' mission for Destiny is discovered in "The Greater Good". Dr. Rush cracks the ship's master code, gaining control of the ship's systems and discovering that the Ancients found an artificial pattern to the cosmic microwave background radiation said to be a remnant of the Big Bang. This discovery suggested the possibility of life before or immediately after the Big Bang, and Destiny was launched millions of years ago to study and gather data regarding this possibility. While Destiny has not solved this riddle after millions of years of research, the series ends with the team continuing its fight for survival while also dedicating itself to researching this possibility of an originating intelligence.

== Cast ==
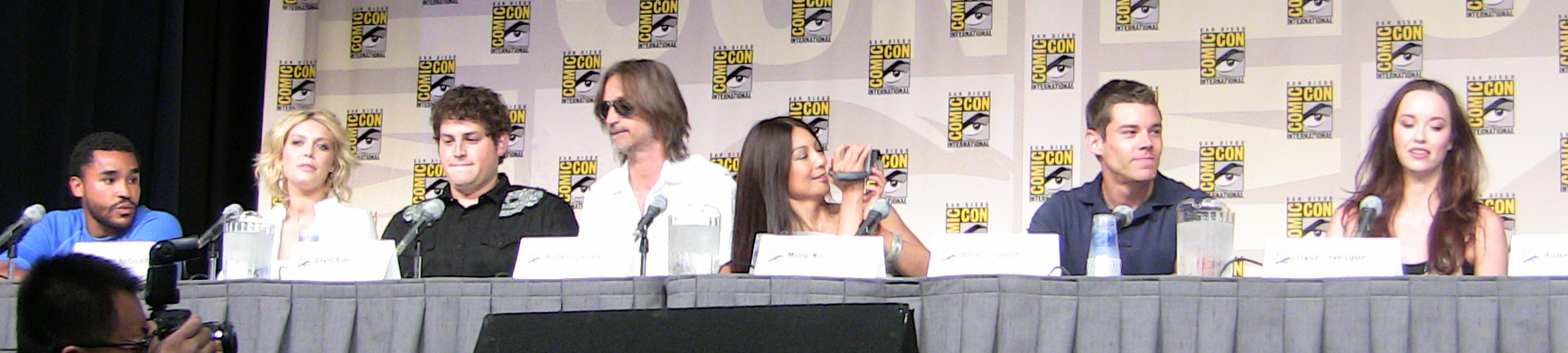
The Stargate Universe cast at Comic Con 2009

- Robert Carlyle as Nicholas Rush – The "ship's brilliant Machiavellian scientist" whom producer Joseph Mallozzi had first mentioned in his blog in mid-November 2008 as Dr. David Rush. The ship's crew believe Rush to be losing his mind, but he does things for a reason. Carlyle explained in an interview that after Rush lost his wife to cancer, he became driven by the opportunity to explore the galaxy. Wright and Cooper intended the character to be different from any previous main characters in the Stargate franchise, "somebody who is not the hero, not the villain, and more of a very flawed and complex person". About a year before being cast, British actor Robert Carlyle wanted to try something new in his career and approached television companies in Los Angeles. They offered him several parts, but Stargate Universe had the greatest appeal to him as "suddenly a drama [was] opening up in space, [and] in the past that was something that was slightly missing from the genre". He was aware of the success of the Stargate franchise and had seen "quite a bit of SG-1, plus a bunch of Atlantis". Carlyle accepted the role because of Wright and Cooper's take on the drama and direction of the show, and he was "more than prepared" to play the character for possibly many years. Carlyle kept his Scottish accent for the role, though mixing it with an English accent
- Louis Ferreira as Everett Young – Described in the initial character breakdown as a "handsome, capable, former SG team leader" in his 40s who holds the rank of Colonel. He is "like the Jack O'Neill of ten years ago" yet has sharper edges. At the beginning of Stargate Universe, he has been married for approximately five years and is the temporary commander of a secret off-world base. Young is Rush's nemesis on the ship.
- Brian J. Smith as Matthew Scott – A 26-year-old skilled and well-trained Airman and junior SGC member holding the rank of First Lieutenant. He is "mentally unprepared for the urgency of the situation" aboard the ship. He was named Jared Nash in the initial casting call. Before being cast, Brian J. Smith had been working as a stage actor in New York for a year and a half. Smith taped his Stargate Universe audition and was invited to a screen test in Los Angeles. He received the news of being cast a few days after the screen test. He prepared for the role by doing military research. He had not seen the Stargate TV series before being cast, but caught up with much of SG-1 afterwards.
- Elyse Levesque as Chloe Armstrong – She is the daughter of a US Senator, 23 years old, whose character is tested "after her father's tragic death and the dire circumstances of being trapped on a spaceship". Her father (played by Christopher McDonald) had political oversight over the Stargate project trying to dial the ninth chevron. Before the producers settled on the final name, the character was named Chloe Carpenter and Chloe Walker. Levesque's "wonderfully nuanced audition" convinced the producers to cast her, as she demonstrated an "impressive range in two very different [and] demanding scenes".
- David Blue as Eli Wallace – Named Eli Hitchcock in the casting call, Eli Wallace is a "total slacker" in his early twenties and an "utter genius" in mathematics, computers and other fields. He is a social outcast with an "acerbic sense of humor", and lacks confidence in his intelligence. The character breakdown compares him to "Matt Damon's character from Good Will Hunting with a little Jack Black thrown in". He was the main source of comic relief in the show. David Blue, a self-declared fan of the science fiction series, has seen all SG-1 and Atlantis episodes.
- Alaina Huffman as Tamara Johansen – Named Tamara Jon in the character breakdown, she is an SGC medic in her mid-twenties with off-world experience and the rank of First Lieutenant. Friends call her "T.J." She finds herself the most medically experienced person aboard the ship after the death of the Icarus Base doctor in the pilot episode "Air" (according to co-creator Robert C. Cooper). She has a modest background, yet is "beautiful, tough, smart and capable", but also has a secretive past with another member of the Destiny's new crew. At the beginning of the series, she is overwhelmed by the lack of medical knowledge, experience, medicines, and supplies aboard the ship. Mallozzi considered Huffman's audition in December 2008 "so good that, quite frankly, we would've been crazy not to cast her".
- Jamil Walker Smith as Ronald Greer – In early casting documents named Ron "Psycho" Stasiak, Ronald Greer is a "big, strong, silent" Marine with a mysterious past who lacks control over his temper in non-combat situations. The character breakdown compares him to Eric Bana's character "Hoot" in Black Hawk Down. His rank is Master Sergeant.
- Ming-Na Wen as Camile Wray – Camile Wray is the first openly lesbian character in the Stargate franchise. She is the IOA representative on Destiny and supports civilian leadership on the ship. Ming-Na was credited as a regular character in the first two episodes. She was downgraded to a recurring character from then on until the episode "Justice", in which she returned and continued as a regular character.

== Production ==
=== Conception ===
Stargate producers Brad Wright and Robert C. Cooper conceived Stargate Universe as "a completely separate, third entity" in the live-action Stargate franchise – as opposed to Stargate Atlantis, which was created as a spin-off from the first series Stargate SG-1. They wanted to produce a stylistically and totally different TV series with a more mature and fresh story approach so as not to get too repetitive. Wright and Cooper originally planned to write the pilot script for Stargate Universe during the summer of 2007, making a 2008 premiere possible. Since their ambitions with the previous live-action Stargate series were often restricted by the low budget and risked coming across as silly, they pitched the show as "an expensive series" to the Sci Fi Channel (now Syfy) in the last quarter of 2007. Although the pitch was well-received, the project was put on hold because of the ongoing work on Stargate Atlantis and Stargate: Continuum, and the 2007–2008 Writers Guild of America strike. The series was given the official greenlight for a 2009 debut by Syfy on August 22, 2008, shortly after the cancellation of Stargate Atlantis had been announced. It was given an initial order of 40 episodes across two seasons. Joseph Mallozzi explained that a new series would have lower salaries and licensing fees than a new sixth season of Atlantis would have had. MGM co-funded the project. According to co-star Robert Carlyle, each episode had a budget of $2 million US dollars.

Brad Wright pitched the series and its first five episodes to the Stargate Atlantis writers and producers in mid-September 2008. Wright, Cooper, and Carl Binder produced the show, while Joseph Mallozzi and Paul Mullie served as writers and consultant producers. Stargate Atlantis writers Martin Gero and Alan McCullough contributed scripts, but were not part of the regular writing staff. New writers were initially sought for freelance scripts and possible staff positions. Author John Scalzi was hired as a creative consultant, "a background rather than foreground sort of job". Most of the Stargate Atlantis crew, such as stunt coordinator James Bamford and composer Joel Goldsmith, moved over to Universe.

=== Casting ===
Short character breakdowns for the series regulars (created for casting calls) leaked on the internet on September 17, 2008. Joseph Mallozzi explained the largely negative initial fan reaction as a passionate response to the preceding cancellation announcement of Atlantis. Brad Wright dismissed negative comments as a sole reaction to the wording of the network; character breakdowns are written to aid casting directors and agents in the selection process, and "always sound shallow, and if they're written to appear 'deep' it's just ridiculous". Robert C. Cooper replied to concerns of young age that the SG-1 cast was also quite young in their first season. The producers were "looking for people who are a little more identifiable and contemporary," with an "everyman on the street point of view" after being challenged by the situation. Martin Gero considered Stargate Universe as an ensemble show, more than the previous two Stargate live-action series were.

Auditions were held in Los Angeles. The producers were looking for well-known names for the lead roles, but intended to mostly cast "either new faces, or people you've seen in other stuff but maybe aren't as aware of". BAFTA and Screen Actors Guild Award-winning actor Robert Carlyle was the first announced series regular in mid-December 2008. The casting of Louis Ferreira, David Blue, Brian J. Smith, and Jamil Walker Smith as series regulars was announced in mid-January 2009. The casting of Alaina Huffman and Elyse Levesque was announced in late February 2009, along with other actors whose status as regular or recurring cast has not been established. The cast is American (Blue, B. Smith, J. Smith, Wen), Canadian (Ferreira, Levesque, and Huffman) and British (Carlyle).

=== Writing and filming ===
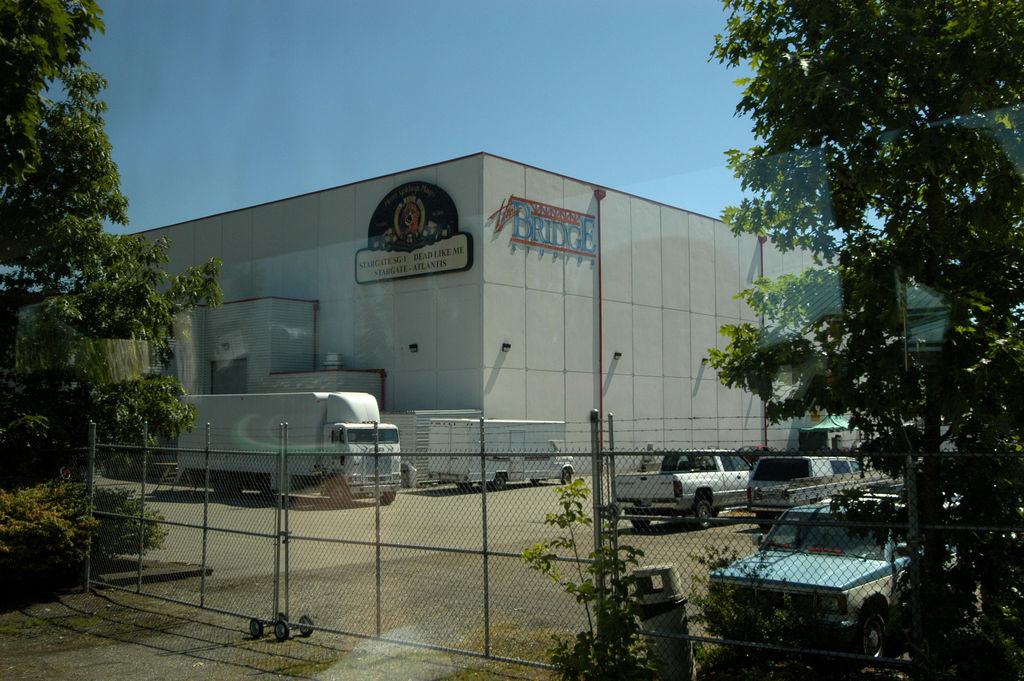
Stargate Universe was filmed at The Bridge Studios in Burnaby, Canada.

The writers started drafting stories for the first season in mid-November 2008. The United States Air Force and Marine Corps reviewed the scripts, and disaster geophysicist Mika McKinnon served as a science consultant. The projected film start of Stargate Universe was initially slated for February 4, 2009, but was moved to February 18, 2009. The show was filmed on stages 2, 4 (Destiny set) and 5 (Icarus Base set) at The Bridge Studios (SG-1 and Atlantis had been filmed at stages 5 and 6) and on location in and around Vancouver, British Columbia. "Air (Part 3)" was filmed in and around Alamogordo, New Mexico from late April through early May 2009. Stargate Universe showed computer-generated worlds filmed in digital sets. Stargate Universe had a markedly different shooting style for more reality and immediacy with inspiration from Cloverfield, as if "a documentary crew were to ride along on this adventure to outer space".

=== Pre-broadcast marketing ===
Sci Fi Wire published concept art of the Destiny in October 2008. The first promotional picture of the cast (out of costume and in casual clothing) was released on March 20, 2009. The same day, Syfy began airing thirty-second trailers of Universe, showing various clips of the Universe team aboard the ship and the SG·U Stargate with the first visual effects. MGM revealed its revamped Stargate Universe website on July 8 with an interactive virtual set tour of the Destiny, interviews with the cast, character profiles and videos. Joseph Mallozzi began posting concept art and behind-the-scenes photos of the SGU set on his blog afterwards. Brad Wright, Robert C. Cooper and most members of the main cast appeared at an SGU panel at San Diego Comic-Con on July 24, 2009. Behind-the-scenes material was shot for future online and DVD use.

== Themes ==
Stargate Universe is set on the spaceship Destiny, which was launched by the race known as the Ancients from the Milky Way galaxy several million years ago. Several ships were sent ahead of it to seed the universe with Stargates. The Ancients had planned on using the Stargate aboard Destiny to board that ship when it was far enough out into the universe, but they eventually abandoned the project after looking into ascension and other endeavors. To reach this ship, an address would have to be dialed consisting of nine chevrons, a possibility that had been unknown in the previous Stargate series, due to energy constraints and the lack of any nine-chevron addresses recorded anywhere until Destiny's address was discovered in Atlantis' database.

The series begins when a team of soldiers and scientists from present-day Earth escape through the Stargate and arrive on the Destiny after their base is attacked. Many of its primary systems are damaged or failing, and they are unable to return to Earth or even maneuver the ship. However, the Destiny periodically stops to dial the Stargate to planets with necessary supplies to repair the ship, and sustain human life. The writers have discussed the possibility that each season represents a voyage of the Destiny through a different galaxy.

Stargate Universe was intended to appeal to both veteran fans and newcomers, being firmly entrenched in established Stargate mythology without relying on it too often. It retained the familiar Stargate themes of adventure and exploration, but focused mostly on the people aboard the ship. SGU was also more serialized than its predecessors, although the writers attempted to resolve each character story within the episode. There was a conscious effort to avoid making SGU too serialized, with the serialization stemming mainly from character development. The industry described the show as "dark and edgy". According to Robert C. Cooper, the essence of the story is "that sort of fear and terror of a tragedy combined with the sense that there is hope for us in the basic ways in which human beings survive". The planned increased levels of drama were balanced with humor to avoid pretentiousness. The differences between good and evil were meant to be less apparent, as the ship was populated with flawed and unprepared characters who are not supposed to go there. According to Brad Wright, the show would "hopefully explor[e] the truly alien, and [avoid] the rubber faced English-speaking one[s]". There were aliens, but not a single dominant villain race like SG-1's Goa'uld and Atlantis' Wraith.

== Broadcast and release ==
=== Home media ===
Season	Product	Episodes	DVD release date			Blu-ray release date	
Season	Product	Episodes	Region 1	Region 2	Region 4	Region A	Region B
1	Stargate Universe - SG-U: 1.0	10	February 9, 2010	—N/a	—N/a	February 9, 2010	—N/a
1	Stargate Universe - SG-U: 1.5	10	July 27, 2010	—N/a	—N/a	July 27, 2010	—N/a
1	Stargate Universe - Complete Season 1	20	October 5, 2010	July 5, 2010	January 12, 2011	October 5, 2010	July 5, 2010
2	Stargate Universe - The Complete Final Season	20	May 31, 2011	July 4, 2011	November 2, 2011	—N/a	—N/a
1–2	Stargate Universe - The Complete Seasons 1-2	40	—N/a	August 29, 2011	November 2, 2011	January 15, 2021	January 15, 2021

== Reception ==
=== Critical reception ===
The series holds a score of 58 out of 100 on the review aggregator website Metacritic.

Stargate Universe was well received by several major media outlets upon airing of the pilot episode. Mike Hale from The New York Times was generally positive towards the pilot episodes, saying the Stargate franchise was "catching up" with the long-running Star Trek franchise. Hale also agreed with Syfy's promotion of it being an "edgier" Stargate. The Boston Globe reviewer Joanna Weiss also reacted positively towards the pilot episodes, saying it felt like "early Lost", while the story arc followed the patterns of Battlestar Galactica. Mark Wilson from About.com gave the episode four-and-a-half stars out of 5, saying Universe accomplishes what Stargate Atlantis was not able to, and said it was "exceptionally well made" compared to other shows. The Pittsburgh Post-Gazette both praised the show, calling it "intriguing", for not abandoning its premise as Star Trek: Voyager did and criticized it by pointing out that the characters spend "far too much time wandering a desert planet" in "Air (Part 3)". The Pittsburgh Post-Gazette summarized their review by saying that, "given time, Stargate Universe may become worth watching if it develops its characters and continues to mine its premise for stories." David Hinckley, a reviewer from The New York Daily News gave the episodes four out of five stars, saying that "Eli's not the only one playing a high-stakes game here."

Among reviewers who were negative towards the new installments was Maureen Ryan from the Chicago Tribune. The reviewer wrote that the "gloomy, underwhelming Universe seems to have ditched many of the elements that the previous "Stargate" shows had, notably camaraderie and a sense of adventure, without adding much in the way of narrative suspense or complexity." The only characters she felt were "worth following" were Eli Wallace and Nicholas Rush. Vince Horiuchi from The Salt Lake Tribune, while not overall positive to the series, said the cast and characters were a "little more likable and interesting" than previous entries in the Stargate franchise. Reviewer Laura Freis from Variety concluded her review with "Sure, SGU is grittier, darker and psychologically deeper than previous versions. But so far, it's also a lot less fun." While negative towards the show, she called Robert Carlyle an "excellent" actor. The Hollywood Reporter noted a lack of "intelligent" and "surprising stories" and was overall negative towards Stargate Universe. The show has also been criticized for its similarities to the reimagined Battlestar Galactica.

=== Ratings ===
In its second season, SGU had declined in viewership ratings. Series co-creator Brad Wright attributed this decline to its change in timeslot (from Friday night to Tuesday night, and then again to Monday night), stating:

I don’t think if we, for any reason, go away, it is an issue necessarily of the quality of the product that we’ve been making. I think getting moved on the schedule has hurt us. And the fact that some of the fans that liked SG-1 and Atlantis were so angry that they have deliberately hurt us, which is unfortunate.

After the cancellation of Stargate Universe, Stargate fans reacted angrily towards Syfy. On May 12, 2011, Syfy released a letter explaining its reasons for the series' cancellation. The letter discussed the fact that ratings during the first season had fallen significantly on the Friday timeslot, dropping over 25% of its viewership during the long hiatus between the first and second half of the season. This prompted Syfy to start the second season in the Tuesday slot making room on Friday for wrestling, the change from Friday to Tuesday leading to a further reduction in viewership.

=== Awards and nominations ===
The episode "Time" won a Writers Guild of Canada Award for best one-hour TV series and both "Air" and "Space" were nominated for Outstanding Special Visual Effects For A Series at the 2010 Primetime Emmy Awards.

Robert Carlyle won Best Performance by an Actor in a Continuing Leading Dramatic Role for the first-season episode "Human" at the 2010 Gemini Awards.
