= Brad Wright =

Canadian TV producer

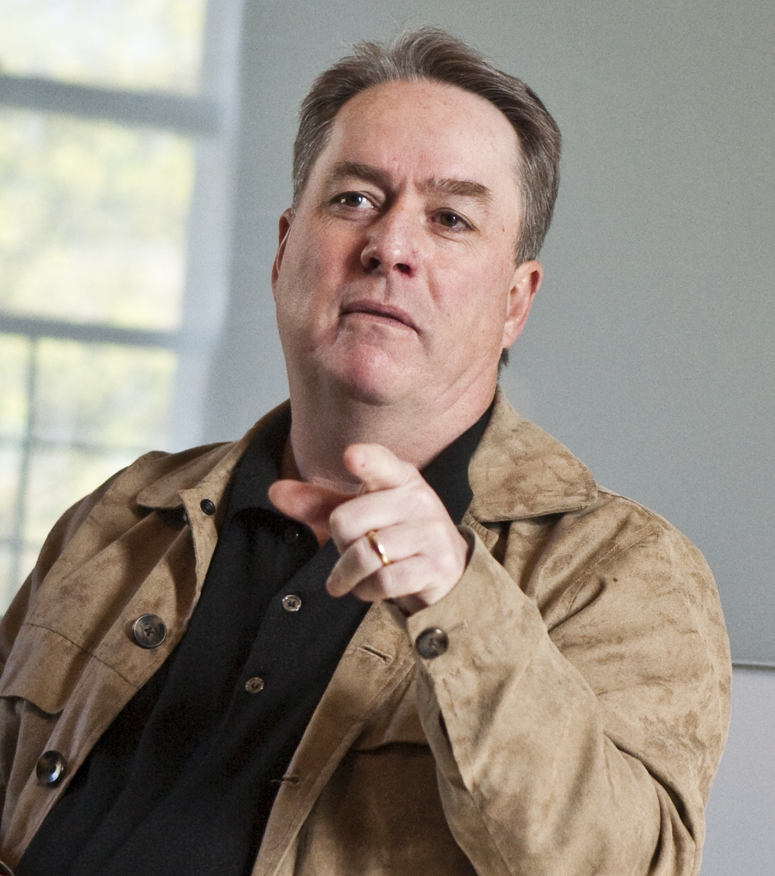
- Wright in 2008
- Born: May 2, 1961 (age 65); Toronto, Ontario, Canada
- Occupations: Television producer, screenwriter
- Years active: 1990–present

Brad Wright (born May 2, 1961) is a Canadian television producer and screenwriter. He is best known as the co-creator of the television series Stargate SG-1 (with Jonathan Glassner), Stargate Atlantis (with Robert C. Cooper) and Stargate Universe (also with Cooper) and as the creator of Travelers.

Before the inception of the Stargate franchise, he served as the co-executive producer and a writer of The Outer Limits. He has also written scripts for several other television series including Neon Rider, The Adventures of the Black Stallion, The Odyssey, Highlander: The Series and Poltergeist: The Legacy.

== Career ==
Wright has appeared twice in Stargate SG-1, as a studio executive in the 100th episode, "Wormhole X-Treme!", and as a parody of Star Trek's Scotty in a fantasy sequence in the 200th episode, "200".

In April 2007, in recognition of his efforts to promote Canadian writing talent, and to recognize his efforts as the primary creative writing force on the Stargate shows, Wright was presented with the inaugural "Showrunner Award" at the Canadian Screenwriting Awards in Toronto. In July of the same year, he won the 2007 Constellation Award in the category Best Overall 2006 Science Fiction Film or Television Script for the episode of Stargate SG-1 entitled "200".

In late March 2009, Wright was nominated for a Nebula Award for "Best Script". The nomination was for the season 5 Stargate Atlantis episode "The Shrine".

== Filmography ==
=== Film ===
Title	Year	Credited as		Notes
Title	Year	Producer	Writer	Notes
Stargate: The Ark of Truth	2008	Yes	No	
Stargate: Continuum	2008	Yes	Yes	

=== Television ===
The numbers in directing and writing credits refer to the number of episodes.

Title	Year	Credited as			Network	Notes
Title	Year	Creator	Writer	Executive producer	Network	Notes
The Adventures of the Black Stallion	1990	No	Yes (3)	No	YTV	
Neon Rider	1990–1994	No	Yes (18)	No	CTV; YTV	
Forever Knight	1992–1993	No	Yes (3)	No	CBS	
Northwood	1993	No	Yes (2)	No	CBC Television	
The Odyssey	1994	No	Yes (3)	No	CBC Television	
Highlander: The Series	1994	No	Yes (1)	No		
Madison	1994	No	Yes (2)	No	Global	
The Outer Limits	1995–2002	No	Yes (20)	No	Showtime; Syfy	Supervising producer (1996: 21 episodes), co-executive producer (1996–98: 23 episodes)
Poltergeist: The Legacy	1996–1997	No	Yes (3)	No	Showtime	
Stargate SG-1	1997–2007	Yes	Yes (40)	Yes	Showtime; Syfy	
Stargate Atlantis	2004–2009	Yes	Yes (11)	Yes	Syfy	
Stargate Universe	2009–2011	Yes	Yes (9)	Yes	Syfy	
Travelers	2016–2018	Yes	Yes (7)	Yes	Showcase; Netflix	
