= Richard Woolsey =

Fictional character in the Stargate television franchise

- Robert Picardo as Richard Woolsey
- First appearance: "Heroes (Part 2)" (SG-1)
- Last appearance: "Seizure" (Universe)
- Portrayed by: Robert Picardo

In-universe information
- Species: Human
- Occupation: Diplomat, member of the NID and the IOA, Commander of the Atlantis Expedition
- Family: Divorced, no children
- Nationality: American

Richard P. Woolsey is a fictional character in the Stargate television franchise about military teams exploring the Milky Way and Pegasus galaxies via a network of alien transportation devices. Played by actor Robert Picardo, Woolsey made his first appearance as a member of the NID in "Heroes Part 2", an episode of season 7 of Stargate SG-1, and recurred in several SG-1 episodes until season 10. He was also a recurring character in seasons 3 and 4 of Stargate Atlantis before becoming a main character in season 5 of Atlantis.

== Role in Stargate ==
=== Character arc in Stargate SG-1 ===
Following the death of Dr. Janet Fraiser late in season 7 of Stargate SG-1, Woolsey is brought into Stargate Command in the episode "Heroes" to examine the command decisions and threatens SGC personnel with court-martial if they do not cooperate. When Woolsey brings his report to President Hayes in "Inauguration", he comes to realize Vice President Kinsey's ambitions and presents incriminating evidence against him, indirectly forcing Kinsey into resigning. Woolsey returns in the season 9 episode "Prototype" and encourages the SGC to take great risks with the captured Goa'uld-human-Ancient hybrid Khalek to learn more about the Ascension process. When the studies cause injury and death among SGC personnel, Woolsey acknowledges his own error and pleads for forgiveness from the SG-1 team. Being the US's representative on the newly formed International Oversight Advisory Committee (IOA), Woolsey and some colleagues are rescued by SG-1 and the crew of the Odyssey after a catastrophe at the Gamma Site in "The Scourge", which he later considers an "eye-opening experience." Woolsey makes two more appearances in "Flesh and Blood" and "Morpheus" and last appears on SG-1 in season 10's "The Shroud". Woolsey remembers the Khalek incident and decides that Daniel, who transformed into a Prior, is too dangerous and must be placed indefinitely into stasis. However, Daniel frees himself before Woolsey's plans can be enacted.

=== Character arc in Stargate Atlantis ===
Faced with the threat of the Wraith, Woolsey tells Dr. Weir that the IOA is considering bringing the Atlantis ZPM to Earth to power the Ancient defense platform in Antarctica. He is also part of an IOA panel that recalled Dr. Weir to Earth to explain her failed alliance with the Wraith. He genuinely respects Weir and attempts to defend her actions, but must defer to his IOA colleagues. The IOA dispatched him to Atlantis to evaluate Weir's ability to command. While evaluating Weir's abilities, he made a rather poor impression on the expedition members. (Lt. Col. Sheppard expressed a strong desire to knock Woolsey on the head.) However, he ultimately sides with Weir by sending the IOA a report modified to favor Weir and keep her in command of Atlantis. When live Ancients were found and reclaimed control of Atlantis, Woolsey and General O'Neill were sent to negotiate with them. Woolsey and O'Neill were allowed to stay as liaisons with the Ancients, and both were trapped when the Asurans invaded and took control of the city. They were eventually rescued by members of the former Atlantis expedition, although Woolsey expressed frustration that he had been duped as a part of the rescue plan.

After Samantha Carter takes control of Atlantis, Woolsey once again returns in order to assess her ability to command the expedition. Once again he finds himself in the middle of a dangerous situation, including coming face to face with a Wraith for the first time. Eventually he leaves and apparently presents a favourable report of Carter's methods. Although he had claimed to want to produce a report which was as thorough as possible, he indicated to Carter that certain facts would be left out to make the report more favourable to her. In an alternate timeline Woolsey became the leader of Atlantis, after Carter was killed in a kamikaze run against three Hive ships. In this timeline, he ordered every resource in Atlantis to focus on the protection of the city and recalled everyone trying to help other humans in the galaxy who had fallen victim to Michael's plans for galactic domination.

Robert Picardo joins the cast of Stargate Atlantis in Season 5, as Richard Woolsey assumes command of the Atlantis expedition after Colonel Carter is reassigned. Once Woolsey learns not to go by the book all the time, he proves to be an effective and good leader.

=== Characteristics ===
Prior to taking his position in the NID, Woolsey was lead counsel for the Army Corps of Engineers and later sat on the Defense Policy Board. He resigned after it was discovered he had ties to a large corporation which had received $800 million in private contracts from The Pentagon. He has an M.B.A. and a J.D. from Harvard, where he served on the Harvard Law Review. Woolsey is divorced and has no children.

Robert Picardo described Woolsey as a "hard guy...with a tough, investigative exterior that was sent in to assign blame." He also called him "a likable Dick Cheney", a "conflict character" and the "ultimate bureaucrat".

== Development ==
Robert Picardo was in the main cast of Star Trek: Voyager from 1995 to 2001. He was familiar with Stargate SG-1 from his time as a Showtime subscriber. He was offered a one-day guest star as Richard Woolsey for the SG-1 episode "Heroes" in season seven (2004) while he was working on The Outer Limits in Vancouver (where Stargate SG-1 is filmed). He was then brought back for the follow-up episode "Inauguration", which began the rehabilitation of the Woolsey character. With the story introduction of the IOA, the Woolsey character made more regular appearances to "annoy people". Eventually, humor was added to the role, and the character was spun over to Atlantis as a recurring guest character.

When Amanda Tapping announced in late 2007 that she would not reprise her regular role as Colonel Samantha Carter on Stargate: Atlantis, the producers immediately agreed on Robert Picardo's Woolsey as the new commander of the Atlantis expedition. Joseph Mallozzi called Picardo, Picardo "was surprised yet delighted at the prospect of coming aboard" and ran it by his wife, and Picardo joined the cast of Stargate: Atlantis in season 5.

== Reception ==
Producer Joseph Mallozzi said that "whenever I do interviews, I often draw parallels between [Amanda Tapping and Robert Picardo]. They are both incredibly kind, professional, delightful to work with, and gifted actors who always elevate the performances of anyone they share a scene with." Actor David Hewlett was enthusiastic and praised Woolsey's promotion to main character, stating "he brings sexy back," and expressed that Picardo's addition to the cast was "fish out of the water [...] he is the last person who should be in charge of Atlantis."
