= Joe Flanigan =

American actor and writer in

- Flanigan at the 2026 Rose City Comic Con
- Born: Joseph Dunnigan III; January 5, 1967 (age 59); Los Angeles, California, U.S.
- Occupations: Actor, writer
- Years active: 1994–present
- Spouse: Katherine Kousi (m. 1996; div. 2014)
- Children: 3

Joe Flanigan (born Joseph Dunnigan III; January 5, 1967) is an American writer and actor best known for his portrayal of the character Major/Lt. Colonel John Sheppard in Stargate Atlantis.

== Early life ==
Flanigan was born in Los Angeles, California. He has said that his mother, Nancy, left his father soon after he was born and that his surname was changed to Flanigan after he was adopted by his stepfather, business executive John Flanigan. When he was six years old, his family moved to a small ranch near Reno, Nevada.

From the age of 14, Flanigan attended a boarding school in Ojai, California, where he appeared in the school production of A Streetcar Named Desire. He later earned a history degree at the University of Colorado where he appeared in the play Coriolanus. On the advice of a friend, he took acting classes to overcome his shyness but did not plan to pursue a career in acting. As part of the Junior Year Abroad program, Flanigan spent a year studying at the Sorbonne in Paris, where he learned French.

== Career ==
After graduation, he pursued a writing career. He worked on Capitol Hill on President George H. W. Bush's advance team and then briefly for several New York City publications, including Town & Country and Interview magazine. On the advice of some of his friends, he studied at the Neighborhood Playhouse, was coached by Gerald Gordon, and then moved back to Los Angeles in 1994 to pursue an acting career.

Flanigan had guest roles in numerous television series including Profiler, First Monday, and Sisters, until he got his breakthrough with his role on Stargate Atlantis as Lt. Colonel John Sheppard. He lived in Vancouver, British Columbia, Canada, where the series was filmed during the week, and flew to Los Angeles during the weekends where his wife and children resided. He additionally wrote for the series and created the stories for the Stargate Atlantis second-season episode "Epiphany" and the fourth season episode "Outcast".

Flanigan appears in Brooks Institute photographer John A. Russo's book About Face. Part of the proceeds are to be donated to Smile Train.

In 2019, Flanigan joined the cast of General Hospital as recurring character Dr. Neil Byrne.

== In contemporary culture ==
Flanigan is featured in the contemporary public artwork, Metascifi (2015) by artist Martin Firrell. Metascifi presents social commentary and philosophical truths about living well, derived from observations of popular American science fiction television series. The project features performers and characters from Stargate, Star Trek, Farscape, Firefly and Warehouse 13.

As the 'meta' element of the title suggests, the artwork invites Flanigan to comment on the wider social and narrative significance of his Stargate Atlantis character John Sheppard. Most notably, he speaks about the sexual attraction of the archetypal action hero, suggesting it is the impression of the hero's agency in the world that underpins people's attraction to characters of John Sheppard's nature.

== Personal life ==
Flanigan married Katherine Kousi, an actress and painter, in 1996. They have three sons. In early 2014, it was announced they had separated.

Flanigan took two prizes in the Waterkeepers' Alliance downhill skiing competition at Lake Louise in January 2006, an event fellow Stargate lead Richard Dean Anderson has attended as well. He currently resides in Malibu, California. On November 10, 2018, the Malibu home he was renting from a local family was lost in the Woolsey Fire.

== Filmography ==
Film
Year	Title	Role	Notes
1994	Family Album	Lionel Thayer	TV movie
1995	Deadline for Murder: From the Files of Edna Buchanan	Scott Cameron	TV movie
1995	A Reason to Believe	Eric Sayles	
1997	Tell Me No Secrets	Adam Stiles	TV movie
1997	The First to Go	Peter Cole	
1998	Man Made	Tom Trey Palmer	TV movie
1999	The Other Sister	Jeff Reed	
1999	The Force		TV movie
2000	Sherman's March	Pete Sherman	TV movie
2002	Farewell to Harry	Nick Sennet	
2003	Thoughtcrimes	NSA Agent Brendan Dean	
2003	111 Gramercy Park	Jack Philips	TV movie
2005	Silent Men	Regis	
2011	Change of Plans	Jason Danville	TV movie
2011	Good Day For It	Deputy Doug Brady	
2011	Ferocious Planet	Colonel Sam Synn	TV movie
2012	Six Bullets	Andrew Fayden	
2012	The Secret Lives of Wives	Jared	TV movie
2013	FANomenon	Himself	TV movie documentary
2015	The Bandit Hound	Trevor	TV movie
2021	Let Us In	Officer Wilton	
TV series
Year	Title	Role	Notes
1994	Family Album	Lionel Thayer	2 episodes
1995	Deadline for Murder: From the Files of Edna Buchanan	Scott Cameron	TV movie
1995–1996	Sisters	Brian Kohler-Voss	Recurring role (15 episodes)
1997	Tell Me No Secret	Adam Stiles	TV movie
1997	Murphy Brown	Scott Hamon	Episode: "From Here To Jerusalem"
1998	Dawson's Creek	Vincent	Episodes: "Tamara's Return" and "Full Moon Rising"
1998	Cupid	Alex DeMouy	Episodes: "Meat Market", "Pick-Up Schticks", "Heart of the Matter" and "End of an Eros"
1998	Man Made	Tom Trey Palmer	TV movie
1999	Providence	Dr. David Marcus	Episodes: "Blind Faith", "Taste of Providence", "You Bet Your Life" and "Pig in Providence"
1999	The Force		
2000	Profiler	Dr. Tom Arquette	Episodes: "Besieged", "Proteus", "Paradise Lost" and "The Long Way Home"
2000	Sherman's March	Pete Sherman	TV movie
2002	First Monday	Julian Lodge	Main role (13 episodes)
2002	Birds of Prey	Detective Claude Morton	Episode: "Prey for the Hunter"
2002	Judging Amy	Tobin Hayes	Episode: "Damage Control"
2003	Tru Calling	Andrew Webb	Episode: "Brother's Keeper"
2004	CSI: Miami	Mike Sheridan	Episode: "Slow Burn"
2004–2009	Stargate Atlantis	Major/Lt. Col. John Sheppard	Main role (100 episodes)
2006	Stargate SG-1	Lt. Col. John Sheppard	Episode: "The Pegasus Project"
2007–2008	Women's Murder Club	FBI Agent John Ash	Episodes: "To Drag & To Hold" and "FBI Guy"
2009	Warehouse 13	Jeff Weaver	Episode: "Elements"
2011	Fringe	Robert Danzig	Episode: "Neither Here Nor There"
2012	Metal Hurlant Chronicles	Hondo	Episode: "Master of Destiny"
2013	Major Crimes	Rick Marlow	Episode: "All In"
2019	SEAL Team	General Trask	Episode: "What Appears To Be"
2019–2020	General Hospital	Neil Byrne	Recurring
2021–2022	See	The Military	Recurring
Writer
Year	Title	Episode	Notes
2005	Stargate Atlantis	Episode: "Epiphany"	Story
2008	Stargate Atlantis	Episode: "Outcast"	Story
Other
Year	Title	Role	Notes
1994	Surgical Strike	Reed	Video Game
2013	Army of Two: The Devil's Cartel	Elliot Salem	Video Game
