= Martin Gero =

Canadian screenwriter

- Born: July 6, 1977 (age 48); Geneva, Switzerland
- Occupations: Screenwriter and co-producer
- Spouse: Melissa Stetten (m. 2018)

Martin Gero (born July 6, 1977) is a Canadian screenwriter. He was a co-executive producer for Stargate Atlantis and is the creator of Blindspot. He was to be the creator and showrunner of an unnamed upcoming Stargate series, before the show was cancelled in June 2026.

Born in Switzerland, Gero spent much of his childhood in Ottawa, Ontario. He attended Canterbury High School for Dramatic Arts and Ryerson University in Toronto, which he ended up dropping out of in his last year. He co-wrote and directed the Toronto International Film Festival romantic comedy favourite Young People Fucking, was a Writer/Supervising Producer on the HBO series Bored to Death, and is set to direct the new Playboy movie.

== Filmography ==
=== Films ===
- YPF (2008)
- Grado 3 (2009)
- The Lovebirds (2020)

=== Television ===
- The Holmes Show (2002)
- Stargate: Atlantis (2005–2009)
- Stargate SG-1 (2005–2007)
- Stargate Universe (2009–2011)
- Bored to Death (2009–2011)
- The L.A. Complex (2012)
- Dark Matter (2015)
- Blindspot (2015–2020)
- Deception (2018)
- Connecting (2020)
- Kung Fu (2021)
- Keep Breathing (2022)
- Quantum Leap (2022–2024)
