= Andy Mikita =

Canadian television director and producer

- Occupations: Director; Producer
- Years active: 1987 – present

Andy Mikita is a Canadian television director and producer. He has worked in the TV and film industry for over 30 years. Mikita is best known for his work as a director and producer for Stargate SG-1 and its sister shows Stargate Atlantis and Stargate Universe.

== Career ==
Andy Mikita began his television career on the 1987 series 21 Jump Street where he worked as a second assistant director. He worked on many other television series from 1989 to 1996 until he joined Stargate SG-1's crew as a first assistant director in 1997, and in 1999 he made his directing debut on the episode "Foothold".

Mikita made his acting debut in a cameo on Stargate SG-1 in the episode "Wormhole X-Treme!", and he appeared again as a wedding guest in the episode "200".

In early 2009, Mikita was slated to direct a direct-to-DVD Stargate Atlantis movie with the working title of Stargate: Extinction. The production was shelved later in 2009.

== Selected filmography ==
=== Director ===
- Stargate SG-1 (1999–2007, 29 episodes)
- Stargate Atlantis (2004–2009, 22 episodes)
- Blood Ties (2007, 3 episodes)
- Stargate Universe (2009–2011, 12 episodes)
- Primeval: New World (2012–2013, 4 episodes)
- Transporter: The Series (2012, 3 episodes)
- Lost Girl (2013, 2 episodes)
- Motive (2013–2016, 12 episodes)
- The Dark Corner (2013, 8 episodes, miniseries)
- Mr. Hockey: The Gordie Howe Story (2013, TV movie)
- Cedar Cove (2013–2015, 5 episodes)
- Played (2013, 1 episode)
- Bitten (2014, 2 episodes)
- Strange Empire (2014, 2 episodes)
- Reign (2015–2017, 3 episodes)
- Killjoys (2015–2017, 2 episodes)
- Olympus (2015, 2 episodes)
- Dark Matter (2015–2016, 3 episodes)
- X Company (2016, 2 episodes)
- Travelers (2016–2018, 11 episodes)
- Chesapeake Shores (2017, 2 episodes)
- Good Witch (2018, 2 episodes)
- Blindspot (2018, 1 episode)
- Unspeakable (2019, 2 episodes, miniseries)
- The Murders (2019, 2 episodes)
- Mystery 101: Words Can Kill (2019, TV movie)
- Virgin River (2019, 4 episodes)
- Family Law (2021, 2 episodes)
- Riddled with Deceit: A Martha's Vineyard Mystery (2020, TV movie)
- Morning Show Mysteries: Murder Ever After (2021, TV movie)

=== Producer ===
- Stargate SG-1 (2002–2007, series producer / co-producer for seasons 6–10)
- Stargate Atlantis (2007–2009, series producer for seasons 4–5)
- Stargate Universe (2009–2010, series co-producer for season 1)
- Transporter: The Series (2012, consulting producer - 6 episodes)
- Family Law (2021, series executive producer)
