= Audrey Esparza =

American actress (born 1986)

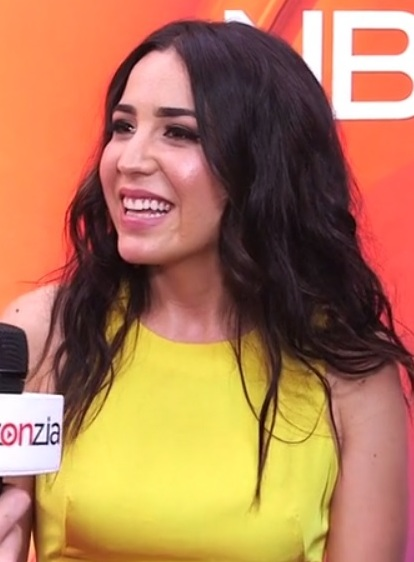
- Audrey Esparza in 2015
- Born: March 4, 1986 (age 40); Laredo, Texas, United States
- Occupation: Actress
- Years active: 2011–present
- Spouse: Jonathan Perzley (m. 2020)
- Children: 1

Audrey Esparza (born March 4, 1986) is an American actress best known for her role as FBI agent Tasha Zapata on the American television series Blindspot, and more recently as Liliana on Power and its spin-off, Power Book IV: Force.

== Early life and education ==
Esparza trained at the Experimental Theatre Wing at the New York University Tisch School of the Arts. She is the daughter of pediatric dentist Felipe Esparza and Sandra Puig Esparza. She has two sisters, Amanda (older) and Alyssa (younger).

== Career ==
Esparza's film credits include: Family Practice, Amateurs, The Americans, Blue Bloods, Golden Boy, Floating Sunflowers, Power, Black Box, Madam Secretary, Public Morals, and her main character as Tasha Zapata, an FBI agent on Blindspot.

== Filmography ==
Year	Title	Role	Notes
2011	Family Practice	Liz Stratton	TV movie
2013	Amateurs	Carmen	
2013	The Following	Dana Montero	Episode: "Let Me Go"
2013	The Americans	Joyce Ramirez	Episode: "Gregory"
2013	Blue Bloods	Jana Garza	Episode: "Protest Too Much"
2013	Golden Boy	Lucy Barrone	Episode: "Scapegoat"
2013	Floating Sunflowers	Rita	Short
2014	Power	Liliana	3 episodes
2014	Black Box	Carlotta	12 episodes
2015	Madam Secretary	Deputy Assistant Laura Vargas	Episode: "Face the Nation"
2015	Public Morals	Theresa	3 episodes
2015–2020	Blindspot	Tasha Zapata	Main cast, 100 episodes
2022	Blanco	Veronica	TV movie
2022–2023	Power Book IV: Force	Liliana	10 episodes
