= Jonathan Perzley =

American sports agent

- Born: June 2, 1984 (age 41); Ridgewood, New Jersey, U.S.
- Occupation: Sports agent
- Spouse: Audrey Esparza

Jonathan Perzley is an American sports agent and partner at Sportstars, Inc., known for representing professional football players in the National Football League (NFL). He has been an NFLPA-certified contract advisor since 2007.

== Early life and education ==
Perzley was born in Ridgewood, New Jersey, and attended Fair Lawn High School, where he competed in tennis and was nationally ranked as a junior.

He later attended the University of Florida in Gainesville, earning both his bachelor's and master's degrees. While at UF, he initially majored in architecture before switching to sports management, drawing on his athletic background.

As a student, he interned with CarrSports Consulting, founded by former UF athletic director Bill Carr, an experience that helped lead him to his later role at Sportstars.

== Career ==
Perzley became an NFLPA-certified contract advisor in 2007, signing his first client, D'Qwell Jackson out of the University of Maryland.

He later joined Sportstars, Inc., where he has represented numerous NFL players, including many from the University of Florida. Over time, he became known for signing a large number of UF athletes, leading some outlets to describe a "pipeline" between the school and his agency.

In September 2025, Perzley helped facilitate defensive back Kaiir Elam's trade to the Dallas Cowboys after the player sought more opportunities following limited playing time with the Buffalo Bills.

By 2025, he represented 56 NFL players, accounting for more than 3% of the league.

=== Reception ===
Reporting from The Independent Florida Alligator has described specific instances in which Perzley assisted clients outside the formal scope of contract work. The outlet noted that he accompanied linebacker Alex Anzalone during part of Anzalone’s post-surgery recovery in Colorado, based on Anzalone’s account in the article. The same reporting stated that Perzley has at times assisted other clients with travel, logistics, or medical-related arrangements.

== Personal life ==
Perzley is married to actress Audrey Esparza. They reside in New York City and have one son.

== Notable current clients ==
According to Spotrac, Perzley actively represents several NFL players, including:

- Alex Anzalone (Detroit Lions)
- Jonathan Bullard (New Orleans Saints)
- Josh Hayes (Tampa Bay Buccaneers)
- Shemar James (Dallas Cowboys)
- Cam Little (Jacksonville Jaguars)
- Evan McPherson (Cincinnati Bengals)
- Kaevon Merriweather (Tampa Bay Buccaneers)
- Jaylon Moore (Kansas City Chiefs)
- Malik Washington (Miami Dolphins)

=== Former notable clients ===
Perzley has also represented a number of NFL players earlier in his career, including:

- Taven Bryan (Jacksonville Jaguars)
- Tamba Hali (Kansas City Chiefs)
- D.J. Humphries (Arizona Cardinals)
- D'Qwell Jackson (Cleveland Browns / Indianapolis Colts)
- A.J. Jenkins (San Francisco 49ers / Kansas City Chiefs)
- Matthew Judon (Baltimore Ravens / New England Patriots)
- Christian Kirksey (Cleveland Browns / Green Bay Packers)
- Juan Thornhill (Kansas City Chiefs)
