= List of Blindspot episodes =

List of episodes of the TV show Blindspot

Blindspot is an American crime drama television series created by Martin Gero, starring Sullivan Stapleton and Jaimie Alexander. The series was ordered by NBC on May 1, 2015, and premiered on September 21, 2015. A back nine order was given on October 9, 2015, bringing the first season to a total of 22 episodes, plus an additional episode bringing the order to 23 episodes.

During the course of the series, 100 episodes of Blindspot aired over five seasons, between September 21, 2015, and July 23, 2020.

== Series overview ==
Season	Episodes	Originally released	
Season	Episodes	First released	Last released
1	23	September 21, 2015	May 23, 2016
2	22	September 14, 2016	May 17, 2017
3	22	October 27, 2017	May 18, 2018
4	22	October 12, 2018	May 31, 2019
5	11	May 7, 2020	July 23, 2020

== Episodes ==
=== Season 1 (2015–16) ===
The episode titles for the first season are anagrams that reveal hints to the plot, which can be strung together to form a coherent paragraph.

No. overall	No. in season	Title / Anagram	Directed by	Written by	Original release date	Prod. code	US viewers (millions)
1	1	"Woe Has Joined" "Who is Jane Doe"	Mark Pellington	Martin Gero	September 21, 2015	276092	10.61
A woman is left naked inside a duffel bag on Times Square, completely covered in recent tattoos, among which is the name of FBI Special Agent Kurt Weller. She suffers from drug-induced amnesia. At the FBI laboratory, they can neither identify her nor does Weller know her, making her a Jane Doe. They also find an older Navy SEAL tattoo that was covered up. One of her tattoos is an address in Chinese characters, leading them to the terrorist Chao. Jane and Weller stop him, which triggers a memory of Jane running a shooting course supervised by an unknown man. This man also appears at the hospital to kill Chao. A flashback shows how the same man has given Jane the amnesia drug at her request. A number on Jane's body matches a redacted file of Assistant FBI Director Bethany Mayfair.
2	2	"A Stray Howl" "Taylor Shaw"	Mark Pellington	Martin Gero	September 28, 2015	4X6302	9.11
Patterson has set up a computer program to constantly cross-reference Jane's tattoos. It brings up the name Major Arthur Gibson, a pilot who wants to expose a secret domestic drone program. He attains control over an armed drone and kills both his former boss and another pilot who had turned him in as a whistleblower. Gibson intends to destroy the drone program by bombing the pilots' operation center. Patterson locates his signal and Weller and Jane stop him. Jane is haunted by flashbacks of killing a nun and suffers from remorse. She eventually remembers that it was a disguised soldier from whom she took a USB key. Weller notices a scar on Jane's neck which coincides with a scar of Taylor Shaw, a childhood friend who went missing 25 years ago, and he becomes certain that Jane is Taylor. His father was accused of kidnapping and murdering Taylor, which split up their family. At night, Jane is surprised by the mysterious man in her apartment.
3	3	"Eight Slim Grins" "The Missing Girl"	Steve Shill	Eoghan Mahony & Martin Gero	October 5, 2015	4X6303	9.06
When the unknown man in Jane's apartment warns her about the FBI, he is shot by a sniper, which makes Jane suspicious and cautious. The FBI is unable to identify his body. Patterson finds the number of the redacted FBI case file of gang leader Saúl Guerrero, which was led by Mayfair, who pretends not to remember. Casey Robek is injured while robbing a jewelry store. He has the same Navy SEALs tattoo as Jane. When he wakes up in the hospital after surgery, he signals to Jane that he knows her, but then his brother Travis abducts him. Travis lets himself get killed rather than be arrested, and Casey whispers the word "Orion" to Jane before he dies. A DNA test confirms that Jane is Taylor Shaw, Weller's childhood neighbor. To Reade's dismay, Jane becomes an official member of the team. Mayfair meets with Tom Carter, Deputy Director of the CIA, to discuss the secret operation "Daylight". Whoever tattooed Jane must have known about it, but only four people did and one is dead. Carter demands Mayfair make the situation go away.
4	4	"Bone May Rot" "Or Maybe Not"	Karen Gaviola	Christina M. Kim	October 12, 2015	4X6304	8.45
Patterson's boyfriend David solves a puzzle on a photo of one of Jane's tattoos. It leads them to a CDC lab where two fanatic scientists are planning to release a deadly virus to save the world from overpopulation, but they are stopped just in time. Patterson asks Mayfair to see the non-redacted Guerrero file but is denied, presumably to protect agents in the field. Carter demands to interrogate Jane himself, but Mayfair refuses. Weller tells Jane about Taylor's past. However, a test that Patterson ran on Jane's tooth shows that she was born in Africa – this contradicts the DNA which matched Taylor Shaw. Zapata's bookie warns her that she has three days to pay off her gambling debts.
5	5	"Split the Law" "The Past Will"	Mark Pellington	Brendan Gall	October 19, 2015	4X6305	7.82
During dinner with Weller's sister, Sarah, Jane cannot stand the pressure to fill the role of Taylor Shaw. She has a memory from her childhood of being led into a basement filled with other children. A crime scene of what seems to be a hostage situation matches an address derived from one of Jane's tattoos, but it is a CIA black site where Director Carter keeps bomb maker Dodi. Dodi is rescued by his team and builds a radiological bomb, but is stopped by the FBI. Carter shows up on-site and is about to shoot Jane, but Mayfair stops him. He openly demands either Dodi or Jane for the CIA, so Mayfair gives up Dodi. Weller's father, Bill, visits Sarah, but Weller refuses to reconcile. Carter gives Zapata money to pay off her gambling debts and demands all the FBI's information about Jane in return.
6	6	"Cede Your Soul" "Cloud Our Eyes"	Rob Hardy	Alex Berger	October 26, 2015	4X6306	7.91
The FBI shuts down a hacker app that can locate government vehicles. Jane has an erotic dream about someone who she thinks is Weller, so she tries to keep her distance from him. However, the man in her dreams is not Weller and is observing her house at night. Zapata ultimately decides to pay her gambling debts by giving the money she got from Carter to her bookie. She tells him that she's out and doesn't want to bet any more. Sarah tells Bill that Taylor is alive.
7	7	"Sent on Tour" "Trust No One"	Steve Shill	Chris Pozzebon	November 2, 2015	4X6307	8.02
When questioned by Weller about the file, Mayfair claims Saúl Guerrero (Lou Diamond Phillips) was an informant and she was his handler but then he started to work against the FBI, which is the reason why the file is redacted. David wants to move in with Patterson and he helps her follow a clue to the Brooklyn Historical Society, but Mayfair finds out about David and reprimands Patterson for giving civilian access to classified information. Afraid, she breaks up with David. The team follows one of Jane's tattoos to a secessionist town in Michigan where they arrest Guerrero. After fighting the town's militia with the help of clues from multiple other tattoos, they bring him into the FBI. When Weller notices that Mayfair has never met Guerrero before, she reveals Operation Daylight to him.
8	8	"Persecute Envoys" "Suspect Everyone"	Marcos Siega	Chelsey Lora	November 9, 2015	4X6308	7.67
Five years ago, Bethany Mayfair met with Tom Carter, Deputy White House Political Director Sofia Varma, and the White House Chief of Staff Davenport. Now, Mayfair tells Weller about all of the valuable domestic intel the NSA collected illegally and that she was given orders to make the intelligence actionable. She used Saúl Guerrero to do that and they made him a front as a CI which let them put dangerous people behind bars. Weller rails at her about all her lies, that she has the case, and why it is tattooed on Jane's body. Mayfair swears she knows nothing more, but her relationship with Weller may be beyond repair. A flashback shows how Sofia, who was her lover, committed suicide. Meanwhile, two NYPD cops are found shot down after being connected to the scene of the shooting of a young black teen that resulted in riots. The unit's numbered logo matches a tattoo on Jane's body. Their investigation reveals a dirty secret of the 65th precinct. Carter demands Zapata keep delivering more information about Jane, which she is reluctant to give.
9	9	"Authentic Flirt" "Lift the Curtain"	David McWhirter	Katherine Collins	November 16, 2015	4X6309	7.74
Patterson decodes another tattoo that leads to a website criminals use to discuss their crimes. They are led to a location, and a shootout with an assassin-couple ensues, which leads to the couple's death. Allison Knight, a U.S. Marshall, and Weller's ex-girlfriend explain there was a hack at WitSec (Witness Security Program) and the assassin-couple was supposed to purchase a hit list. Weller and Jane go undercover as the assassin-couple to get the list and arrest the man selling it. Jane and Weller are transported to the seller's island under high security and the team has to locate where Jane and Weller have been taken. Mayfair and Carter argue about Guerrero, with Carter wanting to kill him and Mayfair plotting to backdate paperwork so he can't pin Daylight on them. However, Carter orders a janitor to kill Guerrero. Zapata is pressured by Carter to place a bug in Jane's safe house, but she doesn't. Patterson meets with her ex-boyfriend David, who wants to reunite, but she wants to stay apart due to her high-level job. Later, David notices a woman looking through a book of codes he and Patterson had found together and follows the woman. After following the woman into an alley, she kills him.
10	10	"Evil Handmade Instrument" "And Unveil the Mastermind"	Marcos Siega	Christina M. Kim	November 23, 2015	4X6310	7.03
Mayfair meets with Carter, and he tells her to get rid of Jane since she is the last link to "Daylight". Zapata gets a "last chance" from Carter to bug Jane's apartment. Following info from the book with a partial print, the team discovers a Russian sleeper cell. The team learns that the red-haired woman is one of them and her mission is to eliminate targets deemed unpatriotic to Russia. They find her and take her down in a heavy fight. Later, Jane ditches her FBI handlers and waits for Weller outside his apartment where she kisses him. She is kidnapped by Carter, who waterboards her for information, causing her to remember that he is connected to "Orion." The man with the tree tattoo saves Jane, killing Carter, and shows Jane a video revealing that "she" is the person who orchestrated everything, including her memory loss.
11	11	"Cease Forcing Enemy" "In Case of Emergency"	Rob Seidenglanz	Martin Gero	February 29, 2016	4X6311	6.85
Oscar, the man with the tree tattoo, tells Jane that she has to trust him and that she was the one who gave the order for her to not know who she is and why she did all of this to herself. One of Jane's tattoos leads the team to an abandoned island, where they find a commercial plane that had disappeared and was presumed lost. Once there, they are apprehended by a group of terrorists who are using the island to keep the passengers hostage and are forcing them to create a device capable of disabling all U.S. GPS satellites. Meanwhile, Chief Inspector Fischer from the FBI Office of Professional Responsibility announces to Mayfair that he will be investigating the death of Patterson's ex-boyfriend David.
12	12	"Scientists Hollow Fortune" "Follow These Instructions"	Rich Newey	Alex Berger	March 7, 2016	4X6312	6.59
Oscar tasks Jane to replace Mayfair's pen with a duplicate. When an army airborne sergeant who was thought to be dead kills three people at an army base, it is revealed that his name is tattooed on Jane's leg along with the names of four other soldiers, all presumed dead. The team tracks him to his mother's old house and they realize that he was being experimented on by a private military contractor trying to make a super soldier. When he is kidnapped by the doctor who experimented on him, the FBI tracks them down to a storage facility in Brooklyn and Weller is forced to shoot him when he has a gun pointed at Jane.
13	13	"Erase Weary Youth" "Stay Where You Are"	Marcos Siega	Chris Pozzebon	March 14, 2016	4X6313	6.25
After a tip reveals a mole within the FBI, the team must hunt for the operative while facing extreme scrutiny from Inspector Fischer. Fischer interrogates Mayfair and her team, probing for their deepest secrets. Fischer finds evidence that Jane's whereabouts were unaccounted for on the night of Tom Carter's disappearance and accuses her of killing him. An FBI informant identifies Jane as the mole and Fischer arrests her. Weller, certain of Jane's innocence, roughs up the informant for more information and learns that Fischer himself is the mole. He and his team work to free Jane and arrest Fischer. Jane breaks out of custody and kills Fischer when the latter reaches for his gun. Reade tells Weller about his and Sarah's relationship; Weller orders him to end it. Realizing that Fischer's case against Jane was highly plausible, Reade and Mayfair begin to wonder if she killed Carter. A furious and shaken Jane meets with Oscar, who says there is a time-sensitive tattoo on her body he needs her to decipher. Jane declares she is done with him and leaves.
14	14	"Rules in Defiance" "Find a Secure Line"	Kenneth Fink	Kristen Layden	March 21, 2016	4X6314	5.89
A tattoo leads the team towards a massive shootout, which was a sting operation the team screwed up. They then stumble on a suspicious death-row guilty plea and a human-trafficking ring. Unable to postpone the execution, the team needs to arrest the people involved in the smuggling ring to save the inmate. Zapata takes the place of the next supposed victim, but is drugged and kidnapped, her tracking device removed. Jane argues with the FBI's therapist about whether or not to leave the FBI but wants back in when she hears Zapata is in danger. The kidnappers find out that Zapata is not who they thought she was. The dirty politicians and businessmen involved flee in fear of being exposed, setting the building on fire with Zapata and the other victims inside. Zapata helps others escape but is trapped. The team gets there just in time, arresting the ring and saving Zapata. Reade is knocked out by a masked man during his investigation into Carter's death. Jane refuses to be Oscar's asset in the FBI. Oscar warns that the people in charge will kill Weller if she doesn't cooperate.
15	15	"Older Cutthroat Canyon" "To Contact Your Handler"	Marcos Siega	Brendan Gall	March 28, 2016	4X6315	5.99
Oscar gives Jane her new assignment: to place a tracker inside the team's vehicle. Reade wakes with a gun at his head. The masked man warns him off investigating Carter's death. Patterson solves a tattooed clue: the burning rose. The investigation leads to a recently-robbed gallery. Weller is injured by a bomb he finds inside a sculpture. Reade and Jane search the artist's apartment but are shot at by a sniper whom Jane recognizes in flashback. When the sniper escapes, Jane runs off as well. Weller refuses treatment until Jane is safe. As the team follows a lead, Jane learns about the sniper from Oscar. At a shipyard, Weller's team becomes trapped in the sniper's hideout. Oscar is directed to keep Jane safe, but, needing to know Weller and the others are safe, she heads to the shipyard and is caught by the sniper. Weller's team blast out of the trap as Jane fights the sniper. Oscar shoots the sniper and both fall into the water. Knowing Sarah is in danger, Reade wants to stop investigating Jane and has to break Sarah's heart to protect her. At their meeting point, Jane finds Oscar alive. The sniper is also still alive.
16	16	"Any Wounded Thief" "Find What You Need"	Tricia Brock	Christina M. Kim	April 4, 2016	4X6316	5.54
As Weller's relationship with Allie develops, his sister decides to move out of his apartment due to her anger over being dumped by Reade. It is also Taylor's birthday and Weller gives her a pendant that belonged to her mother. When an armored truck carrying stolen Sarin gas is robbed, the team's investigation leads to a corrupt general who was selling the gas to South Korea. When Jane gets upset at Oscar for asking her to get closer to Weller, he professes his love for her and they have sex. Meanwhile, Patterson struggles with memories of David when she gets a call confirming a reservation he had made for their first anniversary. After some encouragement from Dr. Borden, she goes to the restaurant with David's last crossword. Speaking to a "ghost" of David, she solves the crossword, which reveals in a hidden message (Note: The message "Got One Patterson" actually appeared in The New York Times crossword puzzle on April 4, 2016, the same day as the episode's original airdate. The crossword was created by David Kwong who intentionally created the message as a tie-in to the show.) that David had solved another tattoo before his death.
17	17	"Mans Telepathic Loyal Lookouts" "In Almost the Last Place You Look"	Jeff T. Thomas	Rachel Caris Love	April 11, 2016	4X6317	5.53
Patterson uses David's clues to decode another tattoo, leading her to an antiquities store where the owner suddenly kidnaps her. When the team later learns of her disappearance and retraces her steps, they learn that her abductor is a serial killer whose powerful brother has been covering up his crimes. After rescuing Patterson, killing her abductor, and arresting his brother, Reade comes forward to Mayfair about the threats against him.
18	18	"One Begets Technique" "To Begin the Sequence"	Karen Gaviola	Martin Gero	April 18, 2016	4X6318	5.46
The FBI must use the felon they put away, Rich Dotcom, to catch a criminal who is the banker for many terrorist organizations. His idea is to stage the robbery of 12 priceless black market paintings from the professor who stole them. Later, the entire heist turns out to be a scheme for Dotcom to escape custody. Meanwhile, Jane meets Weller's father and starts to follow Oscar's plan to pretend to remember things from her and Weller's childhoods. Mayfair's girlfriend Sofia, who was thought dead, turns out to be alive.
19	19	"In the Comet of Us" "Focus on the Time"	Dermott Downs	Ryan Johnson & Peter Lalayanis	April 25, 2016	4X6319	5.58
Zapata solves a tattoo that leads the team to Hudson University on a seemingly worthless mission to uncover scholarship fraud. Once they arrive on campus, a shooter starts a rampage. The team splits up and eventually apprehends the perpetrators who are revealed to be former football players abused by their coach, with whom Reade is close. The show also reveals details into the characters' lives: Weller and his relationship with his dad; Jane and her relationship with Oscar; Zapata and her gamblers anonymous meetings; and Reade getting over his breakup with Sarah and visiting his tailor. Meanwhile, Mayfair gives Sofia money to help her flee her pursuers. Sofia refuses Mayfair's offer of protection and asks her to run away with her; Mayfair declines and sends her away.
20	20	"Swift Hardhearted Stone" "Then Wait For The Address"	Rob Seidenglanz	Christina M. Kim	May 2, 2016	4X6320	5.43
Dr. Borden consults on the case of an autistic girl who draws extremely detailed sketches, one of which matches one of Jane's tattoos. The girl turns out to be the daughter of the leader of a terrorist group and her sketches provide valuable intel. When the girl's mother is murdered, the team takes her to Dr. Borden's aunt's cabin to protect her. There, they stop a group of men who come to kill her. The girl's sketches reveal a State Department diplomat, who was funding the terrorist group, sent the men to keep her from identifying him, resulting in his arrest. Zapata explains her suspicions about Mayfair to Reade. Jane steals data from the FBI at Oscar's request. While Mayfair is enjoying an evening out, her date, Alexandra, is murdered and an anonymous phone call warns her not to investigate Carter's death.
21	21	"Of Whose Uneasy Route" "To Your New Safehouse"	Jeff F. King	Alex Berger	May 9, 2016	4X6321	5.61
When the FBI office is hacked, Patterson must lead the team with analog technology to find the perpetrators and stop them from killing Reade, Sarah, and a stranger stuck in an elevator. Meanwhile, US Attorney Weitz takes over the investigation into Alexandra's death and Mayfair realizes that he tried to recruit Zapata. Sarah tells Reade that she's moving to Portland. Mayfair is arrested for the murder of Alexandra, who wasn't who she claimed. Jane realizes that all of the missions she carried out for Oscar were pieces of a conspiracy to frame Mayfair.
22	22	"If Love a Rebel, Death Will Render" "The Final Order Will Be Revealed"	Romeo Tirone	Brendan Gall	May 16, 2016	4X6322	5.27
When Jane accuses Oscar of using her to get to Mayfair, Sofia appears and reveals that a pre-memory-wipe Jane recruited her into the plot to bring down Mayfair. The team investigates the case of an abandoned baby and uncovers a ring of rogue scientists who are illegally creating genetically engineered designer children. Mayfair breaks out of house arrest to find out who framed her. The evidence trail leads her to Oscar's hideout and Jane; however, Oscar kills her before she can expose Jane's involvement. Mayfair's boss, Director Pellington, expels Jane from the FBI and ends all investigations involving her tattoos, but promotes Weller to fill Mayfair's position permanently. Weller and Jane share a kiss. However, just before dying, Weller's father confesses that he did indeed kill Taylor Shaw, leaving Weller to wonder: just who is Jane Doe?
23	23	"Why Await Life's End" "When It's Filed Away"	Rob Seidenglanz	Martin Gero	May 23, 2016	4X6323	5.85
To track down Oscar, Jane enlists the help of Ana, a young hacker the team had previously saved. Weller and Sarah dig underneath the fort in their childhood home, where Bill Weller said Taylor Shaw was buried, but find nothing. Weller realizes that "fort" referred to an old family campsite; there, he digs up Taylor's bones. Jane finally catches up to Oscar, who knocks her out and captures her. When she awakens, he confirms she is not Taylor, explains their group's plans, and tells her that Shepherd is their leader. As he prepares to wipe her memory again, Jane breaks free and kills him. Reade, Zapata, and Patterson search for Mayfair learning she was murdered. Decrypting a flash drive Mayfair had hidden in her house, they discover files labeled "Daylight," "Orion," and "M7G677." Upon Jane's return to her safe house, she is greeted by Weller, who is furious at her for pretending to remember childhood memories as Taylor Shaw and arrests her.

=== Season 2 (2016–17) ===
The episode titles of the first nine of the second season follow the same anagram formula as the first season. The titles from the tenth episode onward are palindromes; the center letters of the episode titles spell out the phrase "Kurt Weller SOS".

No. overall	No. in season	Title / Anagram	Directed by	Written by	Original release date	Prod. code	US viewers (millions)
24	1	"In Night So Ransomed Rogue" "Nothing Is More Dangerous"	Martin Gero	Martin Gero	September 14, 2016	T13.19851	7.10
When Jane escapes CIA custody after being tortured for three months, NSA agent Nas Kamal recruits Weller's team to recapture her. Under interrogation, Jane explains her involvement with Oscar and the circumstances surrounding Mayfair's death. Nas reveals that Jane and Oscar were members of Sandstorm, a terrorist group, and proposes using Jane as a triple agent to infiltrate them. Though distrustful of Jane, Weller and his team agree to the idea to avenge Mayfair. Jane has the team shoot her to provide an alibi for her disappearance and meets with Roman, a member of Sandstorm. After treating Jane's wound, he takes her to Shepherd, Sandstorm's leader, who reveals that she is Jane's adoptive mother and that Roman is Jane's brother. Shepherd asks Jane, whose real name is Remi, to continue acting as Sandstorm's double agent inside the FBI. Using the NSA's resources, Patterson begins deciphering the files on Mayfair's flash drive, discovering an aerial photo of Jane lying unconscious on a battlefield. Shepherd has a discussion with Roman about their other mole inside the FBI.
25	2	"Heave Fiery Knot" "They Invoke Fear"	David McWhirter	Brendan Gall	September 21, 2016	T13.19852	6.08
Shepherd tells Jane to point the team at another tattoo, which leads to them uncovering a Mexican drug cartel's plot to blow up a plane headed for LaGuardia Airport. They foil the plan, but Nas then tells Jane that every tattoo they solve has ripple effects and unintended consequences. They also learn that Shepherd has people inside the government, including the Department of Justice. It is revealed that Nas is secretly recording Jane's counseling sessions with Dr. Borden. Dr. Borden asks Patterson out to dinner. Allie tells Weller that she is pregnant and offers to let him be a part of the child's life, but Weller is uncertain about the idea of fatherhood. Reade talks to an old friend about testifying against their former football coach from season 1 and realizes that he might have been one of the man's victims. Frantic to protect Jane, Roman drugs, and kidnaps her.
26	3	"Hero Fears Imminent Rot" "For Their Moment is Near"	Jeff T. Thomas	Alex Berger	September 28, 2016	T13.19853	5.60
Jane wakes up in Sandstorm's hideout. Suspicious of her alibi for her three months in captivity due to Cade having been in Venezuela at the time, she said he was keeping her captive and torturing her, Shepherd assigns her a test: to kill an engineer who failed to design a microchip for Sandstorm. When Jane is unable to kill the man, Roman does so instead and returns her to the FBI to await further instructions. The remainder of the team attempts to stop a sequence of bombings throughout New York. When Weller attempts to talk to the bomber to calm him, Nas shoots the man from a distance without warning, escalating tensions between her and Weller. Patterson and Dr. Borden share a kiss. Reade confesses to Zapata that he may have repressed memories of being molested by his former coach. Jane returns to Sandstorm and finds that Roman told Shepherd she passed the test. She thanks Roman, who warns her that plans will be moving quickly, and he will not be able to cover for her a second time.
27	4	"If Beth" "The FBI"	Jeff F. King	Ryan Johnson & Peter Lalayanis	October 5, 2016	T13.19854	5.71
Tormented by the possibility of his repressed memories, Reade has a mental breakdown, beating up a hacker for resisting arrest. Following a clue from one of Jane's tattoos, the team goes undercover at a museum gala where a terrorist murders two people. The terrorist is revealed to be an ex-CIA agent whose identity was erased after she attempted to expose corruption in the CIA, her victim's corrupt agents. The woman believes her daughter was killed, but Weller's team finds her still alive and reunites mother with daughter. At Roman's urging, Shepherd recounts her tragic early life to Jane to bind her closer to Sandstorm and their mission. Zapata hires the hacker Reade attacked for an unspecified job. Nas shows Weller evidence that Sandstorm has been surveilling him for over twenty years.
28	5	"Condone Untidiest Thefts" "Defends The Constitution"	Rob Seidenglanz	Christina M. Kim	October 12, 2016	T13.19855	5.53
Weller's team investigates an assassination attempt on State Senator Donahue. Evidence points to the Senator's terminally ill cousin, Patrick O'Malley, who claims the senator is the secret head of the Irish mob and arranged a fake hit on himself. Escorted by Weller's team and Allie, he collects evidence implicating Donahue, but Donahue's men come to kill him. In the ensuing fight, Allie is shot in the leg and O'Malley sacrifices his life to ensure her escape, as they had been friends for years. After Donahue is arrested, Allie tells Weller that she will have to take a desk job and suggests he do the same for their baby. Thanks to a tip from the hacker Zapata hired, Patterson decodes the M7G677 file, revealing emails between Mayfair and Douglas Winter, the whistleblower who exposed Orion. Jane recovers memories of a doctor who rescued her in Afghanistan and Shepherd explains how she made it back to the US; Shepherd's story is later revealed to be a lie. Obsessed with his former coach's alleged crimes, Reade assaults the man and breaks into his house, where he finds a videotape with his name on it. Zapata finds Reade standing over the coach's dead body.
29	6	"Her Spy's Harmed" (Note: In the weeks leading up to its airing, the sixth episode of the second season was originally titled "Her Spy's Mind".) "Shepherd's Army"	Olatunde Osunsanmi	Chris Pozzebon	October 19, 2016	T13.19856	5.24
Despite being found at the scene of the crime, Reade insists that he didn't do it. As the coach's murder catches Patterson's attention, Reade and Zapata desperately try to cover up everything that could get Reade labeled a suspect. Jane joins Roman on a mission to steal a microchip for Sandstorm. While Roman keeps the security guards preoccupied, Jane tries to upload the microchip data to Patterson but decides to stop mid-upload to save Roman. Meanwhile, Weller and Nas travel to Bulgaria in search of Douglas Winter and learn that the new deputy director of the CIA is on the same trail. When they find Winter, he claims to have been framed, as two masked individuals planted the incriminating evidence on his laptop, and provides an audio recording of the incident. Upon getting Winter back to the States, Patterson descrambles the voices in the recording, which Jane identifies as belonging to Shepherd and Roman. Additionally, Weller recognizes Shepherd's voice.
30	7	"Resolves Eleven Myths" "Only Serve Themselves"	Jeff F. King	Eric Buchman	October 26, 2016	T13.19857	5.20
In a dream, Jane fights a long-haired version of herself whom she can't beat. Later, the FBI computer system is hacked by Rich Dotcom, returned from the previous season when he escaped from the team. Dotcom now wants FBI protection from an assassin called the Akkadian. The assassin kills two FBI agents and primes a chemical bomb in the elevator. Reade and Zapata are arguing over a case when the Akkadian attacks them both and vanishes with an unconscious Zapata. She is injected with a neurotoxin and the Akkadian informs the team that, in return for Dotcom, he will let them know which of three vials contains the antidote. Weller and Dotcom create a false camera loop to set a trap for the Akkadian. Jane's memory of her dream informs her which fight moves to use to beat the Akkadian, whom Weller kills. On the brink of death, Zapata taps Morse code on Reade's wrist to indicate which vial will cure her. Dotcom almost escapes again but, thanks to Patterson, he and his accomplices are finally caught. Meanwhile, Roman receives information that Jane's allegiance is with the FBI.
31	8	"We Fight Deaths on Thick Lone Waters" "When The Soldiers Attack, We Fight On"	Rob Hardy	Kristen Layden	November 9, 2016	T13.19858	4.90
When Jane and Weller disappear while on an undercover mission, Assistant US Attorney Weitz comes to the NY Office to investigate. He and the rest of Weller's team must piece together the conflicting testimonies of two criminals to discover what happened. They eventually find Jane and learn that Weller left to follow the notorious arms dealer funding the mission. When he is captured and auctioned off to the highest bidder, the team wins the auction and poses as the buyers to rescue Weller and arrest the arms dealer. After Weitz threatens to end her career, Nas gives Patterson access to all of her data on Sandstorm. The team enjoys a baby shower for Weller and Allison's baby. Reade helps Freddie, the coach's actual killer, leave town, while Zapata manages to return Freddie's knife to police evidence. Roman comes to Jane's safe house and tells her he needs her by his side as phase 2 of Sandstorm's plan begins.
32	9	"Why Let Cooler Pasture Deform" "We Shall Protect Your Freedom"	Tawnia McKiernan	Brendan Gall	November 16, 2016	T13.19859	5.00
While with Sandstorm, Jane alerts the FBI that their attack is imminent, and Weller's team raids Sandstorm's headquarters. Roman knocks Jane out. When she awakens, Shepherd reveals she has long known Jane is a triple agent for the FBI, thanks to Sandstorm's mole, Dr. Borden. Flashbacks reveal Borden's wife was the doctor who nursed a pre-memory wipe, Jane, back to health in Afghanistan; after his wife was killed by a US drone strike, Jane recruited Borden into Sandstorm. In the present, Shepherd tells Jane she pretended phase two was underway to lure out Weller's team; when the FBI arrives at Sandstorm HQ, she detonates a bomb, trapping them in the rubble. Shepherd orders Roman to kill Jane; when he refuses, Shepherd tries to kill both of them, but Jane and Roman escape. Weller manages to summon help and rescue his team. While treating Roman's wounds, Jane erases his memory, hoping to give him the same second chance she had. Patterson recognizes Borden's ring, realizing he works for Sandstorm. When she tries to arrest him, he fights back, and a shot rings out; it is not shown who was hit.
33	10	"Nor I, Nigel, AKA Leg in Iron"	David Tuttman	Rachel Caris Love	January 4, 2017	T13.19860	5.14
The shot is revealed to have hit Patterson, and although she survives, she is captured by Borden and tortured for information by Shepherd. An amnesiac Roman escapes Jane's custody and is later rescued from Sandstorm's men by Jane and Weller. The FBI interrogates him for clues on Patterson's location, but he remembers nothing. Zapata finds a coded message from a Sandstorm operative, which leads the FBI to Borden's location. Director Pellington removes Nas from the FBI for ordering the failed raid on Sandstorm. The FBI rescues Patterson just before she would be killed, but Borden escapes. Reade makes romantic advances towards Zapata, which are rejected. Pellington orders Roman to be turned over to the CIA for further questioning, but relents and also reinstates Nas after Weller threatens to resign. Patterson cracks an encrypted phone and discovers a rough draft of Jane's tattoos that includes a mysterious tattoo not present on Jane's body.
34	11	"Droll Autumn, Unmutual Lord"	Adam Salky	Hadi Nicholas Deeb	January 11, 2017	T13.19861	5.01
When terrorist leader Anton Stepulov enters the US, Weller's team investigates. They learn he has been brought to the US by CIA Deputy Director Keaton to give information on a terrorist attack in exchange for a heart transplant for his son. Stepulov's son dies during the operation, and the FBI is forced to stop the attack without Anton's help. They deduce that the target of the attack is a high school basketball tournament where Keaton's daughter, Erin, is playing. Stepulov's men kidnap Erin and hold her hostage, but she is rescued by Weller and Keaton, and the attack is foiled. Allie tells Weller that she is considering moving to Colorado with their child. Nas brings in a psychiatrist to evaluate Roman, and she concludes that he lacks empathy. Patterson solves the puzzle of the missing tattoo: it leads to Kat Jarrett, a member of a biker gang, who has an unknown link to Roman.
35	12	"Devil Never Even Lived"	Kate Woods	Deanna Shumaker & Chris Pozzebon	January 18, 2017	T13.19862	4.73
Jane and Roman go undercover to infiltrate Kat Jarrett's biker gang, the Viper Kings. After Roman sees Kat, he remembers they were romantically involved and planned to run away together, but Remi forced him to abandon her. Jane and Roman arrange a fake heist to provide the Kings with explosives, which they will sell to Sandstorm, giving the FBI a chance to arrest Shepherd. After the heist is successful, a suspicious Kat accuses Roman and Jane of working with the police; Roman confesses but claims he only did it to be with Kat. Kat helps him and Jane escape the Kings, but is fatally shot, professing her love for Roman with her dying breath. The FBI raids the meeting between the Kings and Sandstorm, but finds Shepherd has already left with the explosives. Because of this, Nas breaks up with Weller, feeling their relationship is clouding their professional judgment. Jane recognizes Shepherd in a photo from Weller's old high school yearbook, and Weller remembers who Shepherd is.
36	13	"Name Not One Man"	Glen Winter	Ryan Johnson & Peter Lalayanis	February 8, 2017	T13.19863	4.64
Visiting his old military academy, Weller learns Shepherd's real name, Ellen Briggs, and that she funded his education. Weller's team investigates Jared Wisnewski, leader of a group of anti-government farmers planning a bomb attack, learning Wisnewski is an FBI informant who was entrapped by Agent Boyd. Weller allows Wisnewski to meet with his co-conspirators so the FBI can arrest them, but Wisnewski is shot and one of the conspirators escapes, planning an attack on a new target. Weller fires Boyd and his team manages to avert the attack. Weller interrogates Sean Clarke, a former colleague of Shepherd's who is disabled from a stroke, about Shepherd, but Clarke only rambles about baseball. Later, Patterson discovers Clarke blocked the promotion of Weller's on Shepherd's orders and Weller realizes Clarke's "ramblings" were a coded message. Patterson collapses from overwork, Reade uses cocaine to unwind with Niki, and Jane starts a relationship with Oliver Kind. Meeting again with Weller, Clarke mentions the "Truman Protocol," but he and Weller are then kidnapped by Shepherd. Shepherd kills Clarke and taunts Weller before escaping, saying they are very much alike and he will eventually have no choice but to join her.
37	14	"Borrow or Rob"	Laura Belsey	Eric Buchman	February 15, 2017	T13.19864	4.07
Weller's team is forced to go undercover with Rich Dotcom to infiltrate a secret society, some of whose members are planning to start a war. Weller and Rich confront their most likely suspect, a Silicon Valley entrepreneur named Zach Riley, but he turns out to be innocent. Rich is kidnapped by the real culprit and forced to hack a computer to allow him to detonate a dirty bomb, thus starting the war; Weller frees Rich, but not before being forced to shoot him. Nas, Jane, and Roman travel to various locations where Shepherd used to live in the hopes of triggering some memories. He remembers that he killed Taylor Shaw's mother; Jane tells him to keep it from Nas and that she will tell Weller. Zach Riley meets with Borden, who tells him that his work is crucial to Phase 2 of Sandstorm's plan.
38	15	"Draw O Caesar, Erase a Coward"	Darnell Martin	Christina M. Kim	February 22, 2017	T13.19865	4.13
Based on a tattoo decoded by Rich Dotcom, Patterson can link three tattoos to a notorious near-mythical smuggler. To follow up on the various leads, Jane and Zapata question an antique dealer brought in on a manslaughter charge a few months ago, Weller and Roman infiltrate a prestigious clinic, and Patterson and Reade investigate another address. They discover that the antique business and the other address are used as fronts for a human smuggling ring that brings illegal immigrants to the clinic, where their organs are harvested for wealthy patients. Weller and Roman are captured by the smugglers, but the rest of the team finds them in time. Observing his actions during the case, Patterson attempts to confront Reade about his developing drug habit, but he rebuffs her efforts. Later, Nas receives a new call from her old Sandstorm contact but, when she goes to the dead-drop, she is attacked in her car.
39	16	"Evil Did I Dwell, Lewd I Did Live"	David McWhirter	Alex Berger	March 22, 2017	T13.19866	4.26
Nas narrowly survives the attempt on her life and concludes that Sandstorm may have uncovered her informant. The team sets up a sting operation to catch him, during which Jane is attacked by Cade. When backup arrives, however, Cade reveals that he is the informant, having grown disillusioned with Shepherd's disregard for human life. He reveals the location of a fixer working for Sandstorm, but the man is killed before he can be extracted. Patterson discovers a transmitter hidden in her tooth and uses it to set a trap for Borden. Wounded, Borden kills himself with a grenade and his men commit suicide. Cade is set free but refuses to assist any further out of fear for what Shepherd has planned. Zapata confronts Reade about his cocaine usage and warns Weller. While having dinner with Oliver, Jane is ambushed and tranquilized by masked men.
40	17	"Solos"	David Johnson	Kristen Layden	March 29, 2017	T13.19867	4.32
Jane and Oliver awaken in captivity. It is revealed that Oliver's father and business partner embezzled millions of dollars, and the kidnappers intend to ransom Oliver and the partner's children for the money. Jane manages to alert the FBI, and Weller's team successfully rescues the children as well as Oliver and Jane, discovering that Oliver's father, long missing, has passed away. Afterward, Oliver breaks up with Jane. Weller offers to let Reade take time off to get help, but Reade resigns instead. Weller arranges to allow Roman to live with Jane in her safe house. Roman recovers a memory of him retrieving money from a trust fund under Jane's birth name, Alice Kruger. Heavily traumatized by her experience with Borden, Patterson tears apart her apartment looking for surveillance devices. Reade is recognized as an officer by a group of drug dealers, who beat him up. The team is officially notified that they are under investigation by the US Attorney for aiding and abetting terrorists.
41	18	"Senile Lines"	Jeff T. Thomas	Ryan Johnson & Peter Lalayanis	April 5, 2017	T13.19868	4.34
Weller's team investigates the death of a teenager living in a foster home and uncovers a conspiracy to illegally test new drugs on foster children. Jane persuades Weller to allow Roman to help the FBI in the field and they track down the children and arrest the conspirators. AUSA Weitz interrogates the members of Weller's team, hunting for evidence to justify a congressional inquiry into their work on Sandstorm. To protect Weller and the rest of the team, thereby allowing them to continue to pursue Sandstorm, Nas takes full responsibility for the task force's mistakes. While in the hospital, Reade opens up about his torment to a fellow patient and ultimately decides to watch Coach Jones' tape together with Zapata to find closure. Shepherd obtains large amounts of nuclear material from an associate, warning him to avoid the Western Hemisphere during Phase 2.
42	19	"Regard a Mere Mad Rager"	Ernest Dickerson	Alex Berger	April 26, 2017	T13.19869	4.33
Patterson manages to freeze Sandstorm's accounts before Shepherd can purchase the nuclear materials, leading to a chase around Bangkok before she gets arrested. Shepherd manages to escape and reacquire the materials. Meanwhile, Weller's team follows another tattoo leading to a scavenger hunt orchestrated by a pair of hacker siblings offering a database full of classified intel, including on the Truman Protocol. Weller and Jane manage to acquire the database before Sandstorm, forcing Shepherd to order Weller's death. Zapata gets arrested by the NYPD for obstruction of justice.
43	20	"In Words, Drown I"	Dermott Downs	Christina M. Kim	May 3, 2017	T13.19870	4.18
Zapata's arrest is revealed to be a ruse set up by Weller and Patterson to gather intelligence from Devon (Ronda Rousey), a gunrunner with ties to Sandstorm. When Devon is stabbed by another inmate, however, she is forced to stage a breakout with the team's assistance. Weller learns the truth about Taylor's mother's death but recognizes that Shepherd, not Jane, is to blame for what happened. Devon sets up a rendezvous with her boyfriend Parker but changes the location to mislead the team. Parker identifies Zapata and subdues her to set an ambush for Weller and Jane. An increasingly unstable Patterson attacks one of her techs and steps off the case. Weller rescues Zapata and captures Parker and Devon. Jane inadvertently triggers a memory in Roman that reveals she erased his memory, and he attacks her in a rage.
44	21	"Mom"	Rob Seidenglanz	Chris Pozzebon	May 10, 2017	T13.19871	3.92
Roman is subdued and returned to FBI custody, regaining many of his memories. Reade decides to transfer out of New York. Jane and Weller follow a lead from Parker, which turns out to be a ruse to lure them away. Shepherd and her team storm the New York office and seize control, killing Director Pellington and other agents to gain access to Patterson's computer, which she plans to use to carry out attacks on federal buildings. Patterson, Reade, and Zapata stop Shepherd, but Zapata is severely wounded. Jane and Weller return to the FBI and defuse multiple bombs planted by Shepherd. Roman rejoins Shepherd and escapes with her. Weller is taken to a hidden bunker, where he learns that he is part of a secret continuity-of-government program, COGS, intended to be activated in a national emergency. He realizes that phase 2 of Shepherd's plan is to wipe out the federal government and leave COGS in charge of America.
45	22	"Lepers Repel"	Jeff F. King	Rachel Caris Love	May 17, 2017	T13.19872	4.28
Weller escapes the bunker with CIA Deputy Director Keaton. Patterson traces the explosives used in Shepherd's attacks to Zach Riley; under interrogation, he reveals that Shepherd plans to crash a satellite into Washington, D.C., where she has hidden nuclear material. After Zapata and Keaton find the nuclear material in an ambulance, Jane and Weller go to confront Shepherd. While Jane drives the ambulance into a tunnel to minimize the fallout, Weller searches for the beacon Shepherd is using to guide the satellite. Roman crashes a car into the ambulance, injuring Weller. Realizing Shepherd swallowed the beacon, Weller defibrillates her, disabling it and allowing Patterson to redirect the satellite into the ocean. Jane fights Roman, but cannot bring herself to kill him, letting him escape. Shepherd is arrested and placed in Nas' custody. The team celebrates and Jane and Weller consummate their relationship. Two years later, Jane is living on a mountaintop with monks, having left Weller and the FBI for unknown reasons. Weller comes to see her, asking for her help in finding Patterson, Reade, and Zapata, who have suddenly disappeared. He is wearing a wedding ring and has a sealed box marked with Jane's name, which opens when they both touch it. Inside is a metallic object that causes Jane's tattoos to light up.

=== Season 3 (2017–18) ===
Each episode title in the third season contains a three-letter pattern, in which the first and third letters are the same. The middle letters can be strung together to spell out the phrase "One Of Us Will Give Our Life".

No. overall	No. in season	Title	Directed by	Written by	Original release date	Prod. code	US viewers (millions)
46	1	"Back to the Grind"	Martin Gero	Martin Gero	October 27, 2017	T30.10001	4.13
Jane and Weller marry and begin a family life in Colorado, but they're attacked by assassins seeking to collect Bertrand Keele's 10-million dollar bounty on Jane. Jane goes into hiding to protect Weller. Zapata joins the CIA, Reade is head of the NYO, and Patterson works in technology. They are kidnapped by Venezuelan soldiers demanding that Patterson decrypt a CIA computer. In the present day, Weller reunites with Jane, who now has new bioluminescent tattoos, and one leads to Venice. They battle Roman, who is responsible for the new tattoos. Weller helps Jane fake her death to end the bounty. Zapata, Reade, and Patterson escape and are rescued by Jane and Weller. The FBI and CIA create a joint task force to deal with Roman and the new tattoos, reuniting Weller's old team. Zapata mentions a mysterious dragonfly tattoo to Keaton, which she wants to keep secret. Jane conceals a stash of money and passports from Weller. Patterson has secretly been in contact with Rich Dotcom, who now works for the FBI. Weller is accosted by Roman, who threatens to tell Jane "what happened in Berlin" unless Weller does as he demands.
47	2	"Enemy Bag of Tricks"	David Tuttman	Chris Pozzebon	November 3, 2017	T30.10002	3.50
A black box with the ability to disable a missile defense system is stolen from a downed satellite, bringing Jane face-to-face with an unscrupulous mercenary she worked with during her absence. With the threat of a nuclear strike by North Korea looming, the team frantically searches for the black box. They discover that one of the satellite's creators is working with North Korean agents and recover the box before the missiles can be launched. Roman befriends a wealthy former soldier, Thomas Jakeman, who Roman kills to steal his identity and wealth. Zapata meets Reade's girlfriend. Patterson finds her colleague Stuart murdered in his apartment.
48	3	"Upside Down Craft"	Solvan "Slick" Naim	Christina M. Kim	November 10, 2017	T30.10003	3.38
After Jane and Weller arrest a financial tycoon, Kevin Loewe, his lawyer insists he was framed by an anonymous hacktivist group, the Three Blind Mice. It is revealed Patterson and Rich Dotcom were formerly members of the group but left when the third member, Kathy, began executing malicious hacks. The FBI interrogates Kathy. Patterson uses a backdoor in the app she created to help prove Loewe is guilty of corporate sabotage and Jane and Weller stop the saboteurs. Realizing Patterson and Rich were the other Mice, Kathy kidnaps them and tries to force them to perform criminal hacks. Patterson manages to signal the team for a rescue. Reade voices his suspicions that Patterson and Rich were the other members of the Mice but says he cannot pursue them for lack of evidence and suggests that Jane's new tattoos are intended to reveal secrets the team wants to keep hidden. Patterson continues investigating the tattoo Stuart was working on, finding it is linked to Van Gogh. An unknown one-eared man is seen concealing evidence of Stuart's murder.
49	4	"Gunplay Ricochet"	David McWhirter	Ryan Johnson & Peter Lalayanis	November 17, 2017	T30.10004	3.37
Following one of Jane's tattoos, the team investigates Marcus Dunn, an anti-technology bomber thought to have died over twenty years ago. The trail leads the team to a man named Rosmond "Rossi" Ott, who recognizes Jane as Remi. Ott is transferred to the custody of the State Department by Assistant Secretary of State West; however, Ott escapes. The team learns Dunn is alive. They deduce his next target; Reade kills Dunn and Jane and Weller work together to defuse his bomb. Zapata sees Reade meeting secretly with West. Ott sends Jane documents revealing that she has a daughter whom she put up for adoption. Posing as Thomas Jakeman, Roman attends a charity auction hosted by a socialite, Blake Crawford. He flirts with Blake and places a tracking device on her.
50	5	"This Profound Legacy"	Rob Seidenglanz	Rachel Caris Love	December 1, 2017	T30.10005	3.35
The team investigates a series of arson attacks that lead them to Vanya Petrushev, the rightful king of the nation of Kazarus, who is being targeted for assassination by his uncle, the current king. The team finds and rescues Vanya and his mother from the assassins. When his uncle is overthrown, Vanya decides to go to Kazarus to help lead the people. Suspicious of Reade's behavior, Zapata and Patterson concoct fake evidence in the case of Stuart's murder to lure out the mole within the FBI; FBI Director Hirst attempts to frame Reade by using his login to delete the "evidence." Reade refuses to believe Zapata and Patterson's accusations and demands they produce hard evidence against Hirst. Roman tells Jane that Shepherd forced her to give up her daughter and Jane resolves to find her at all costs. A flashback reveals that, while searching for Jane in Berlin, Weller met her daughter, Avery, who was also searching for her.
51	6	"Adoring Suspect"	Glen Winter	Eric Buchman	December 8, 2017	T30.10006	3.50
Weller goes undercover in Hollywood to investigate the connection of Keith Rhodes, a famous actor, to a notorious organized crime boss, Nico Popov. Reade's team learns that Popov is using Rhodes' producer as a front to ship WMDs all over the world and that Popov is planning a chemical attack in America. Weller and Jane thwart the attack and arrest Popov. Roman engineers another encounter with Blake Crawford and the two grow closer. Jane decides to abandon the search for her daughter. Hirst issues a veiled threat to Reade after he confronts her about her connections to Kevin Loewe. Reade joins Jane, Weller, Patterson, Zapata, and Rich to help bring Hirst down.
52	7	"Fix My Present Havoc"	Lin Oeding	Kristen Layden	December 15, 2017	T30.10007	3.33
A flashback reveals that Hirst killed Stuart for solving the tattoo leading to the one-eared man's identity. In the present day, clues from Roman lead the team to Dr. Margaret Palmieri, the director of a cancer drug trial who is accepting bribes. While interviewing one of the trial's participants, Jane and Weller come face-to-face with his husband: the one-eared man. They capture him, learning he is Eric Vance, an ex-US Marshal. Vance reveals Hirst blackmailed him into working for her by threatening to force Palmieri to withdraw his husband from the drug trial and agrees to testify against Hirst if they arrest Palmieri. Patterson deduces that Palmieri plans to release a deadly virus to become rich by selling the cure. Hirst demands that Reade expel Zapata from the task force and the FBI. With Allie's help, Jane and Weller stop Palmieri from releasing the virus. Vance tells them Hirst murdered Stuart. When Vance is killed shortly after being placed in witness protection, Weller realizes that Hirst knows the team is investigating her.
53	8	"City Folks Under Wraps"	David Tuttman	Brendan Gall	December 22, 2017	T30.10008	3.50
A dangerous game of cat-and-mouse ensues as Hirst tries to stop Reade's team from exposing her. Roman meets Blake's father, Hank Crawford, and it is revealed that Hirst is in his employ. Roman demands Weller kill Hirst now that Vance is dead. Hirst frames Patterson for Stuart's murder. Reade pretends to side with Hirst against the rest of the team. After Rich helps Patterson escape the FBI, he is arrested by Hirst. Jane and Weller steal Hirst's phone to get data from it. Weller gets himself arrested to help Jane escape and get the phone data to Patterson, who finds a lead in the data just before being arrested. Zapata follows the lead Patterson found and obtains an audio recording of Hirst killing Stuart. The recording is played over the FBI intercom and Hirst is arrested for murder. Hirst reveals her subordinates have kidnapped Zapata, forcing Reade to help her escape. Jane and Weller track them and free Reade and Zapata. Weller arrests Hirst rather than killing her as Roman ordered. No longer wanting to let Roman blackmail him, Weller tells Jane his secret from Berlin: he killed her daughter.
54	9	"Hot Burning Flames"	Adam Salky	Chris Pozzebon	January 12, 2018	T30.10009	3.56
The team investigates missing nuclear warheads, discovering that they were stolen by Lana, the sister of terrorist leader Anton Stepulov who wants vengeance for her brother's death. Weller is forced to leap out of a plane to disarm the warhead. Victor, Hank Crawford's right-hand man, tests Roman by forcing him to recover a valuable item. In a flashback, Weller explains to Jane what happened in Berlin: he accidentally shot Avery while confronting a gangster named Max. In response, Jane removes her wedding ring and declares that she is leaving him. It is revealed Avery is still alive and being held captive.
55	10	"Balance of Might"	Martha Mitchell	Tracy Whitaker	January 19, 2018	T30.10010	3.55
Six months prior, Roman warns Kenyan refugees about Saya, who is arranging their travel to New York. Roman hands them Megan Butani's New York Times business card. In the present, Meg helps the team after learning that the refugees are linked to one of Jane's tattoos. Saya is revealed as a terrorist who uses refugees to cover his bombing attacks, and that he has targeted a New York hotel that is hosting a technology convention. The team must save both the backup group, and stop the hotel bombing. Jane recalls meeting and working with Clem, and with whom she also slept, despite her love for Weller. Tensions between Roman and Victor increase as Victor becomes suspicious of "Thomas Jakeman." Victor gets Roman's fingerprints from a shot glass. After the day's events, Jane meets Clem in his New York hotel room. Patterson shows Weller footage she discovered of Avery from the day before Avery met him in Germany, in which she meets with Roman for a pay off, prompting Weller to believe he was set up.
56	11	"Technology Wizards"	Jeff F. King	Christina M. Kim	January 26, 2018	T30.10011	3.75
Patterson discovers a recent distress call from Avery proving she is alive, held by German gang leader Dedrick Hoehne. Reade sends Jane and Weller to Berlin to save her. At Jane's insistence, he also sends Clem, much to Weller's dismay. In Berlin, they track Dedrick's gang to abandoned tunnels. Weller and Roman come face-to-face at a wall made of bulletproof glass. Roman insists that Crawford is their common target and promises more surprises. Patterson discovers the game she developed, Wizardville, was hacked to blackmail its players. Rich recognizes his ex-boyfriend Boston's code signature. Patterson admits she hired Boston to work on the app. Boston turns himself in, admitting he and his new boyfriend Sanjay targeted bad people. Boston collaborates with the FBI to stop Sanjay from selling phosphorus bombs to a terrorist group. Rich asks Boston to resume their relationship, but Boston declines. Zapata finally decides to tell Reade about her feelings for him but, Reade shows her the ring he bought for Meg. Roman calls Jane to say she will regret getting Avery back.
57	12	"Two Legendary Chums"	David McWhirter	Ryan Johnson & Peter Lalayanis	February 2, 2018	T30.10012	3.20
Avery reluctantly tells Jane and Weller her story, revealing that her adoptive father's boss, Hank Crawford, is responsible for driving him to suicide. Roman sends video to Patterson that names Weller's old partner, Donald Shipley, who is undercover for Homeland Security to capture ex-Green Beret Nils Bresden and his militia who plan to overthrow the US government. Weller must pose as an EMP expert to help Shipley. In Morocco, Victor and Roman accompany Crawford to make a secret land deal. Victor tells Roman he knows that he is not "Tom Jakeman." Zapata interrogates Hirst at a black site about Crawford. Hirst reveals Crawford has ties to Bresden's militia. When Bresden fails him, Crawford concludes that someone close to him has been working with the FBI. He stabs Victor to death, after Roman swapped phones with Victor to set him up. Jane shows Avery everything they have on Crawford and promises to take him down. Jane goes to Weller and decides to forgive him. Crawford tasks Roman to kill the FBI team who are interfering with his plans.
58	13	"Warning Shot"	Kristin Windell	Matt Young	March 2, 2018	T30.10013	3.12
Nas Kamal visits team with a solution to a tattoo involving a computer virus recently stolen from the NSA by PopUpKid, an infamous hacker whose real name is Delilah Bunny. Nas also warns Zapata to be prepared when Project Dragonfly is eventually revealed. They learn the device was auctioned to Cameron, a teen hacker fronting for Iranian terrorists. Rich, posing as Cameron, contacts Delilah to complete the deal at Le Soirée Foncé, a dark web party. Reade reluctantly sends Rich, with Nas, Jane, and Kurt. They cross paths with criminal Sho Acktar, who plans to take the virus. Sho escapes, but Jane recovers the device. Nas takes the virus to regain her position at the NSA. Nas informs Kurt that Avery's father had illegal dealings with Crawford. Meg reveals to Tasha that she is undocumented. Edgar proposes to Meg. In Brazil, with Roman posing as her bodyguard, Blake plans to crash a high-stakes poker game run by her old friend Christophe in order to help her father get a new land deal. Blake and Christophe are kidnapped in front of Roman.
59	14	"Everlasting"	Dermott Daniel Downs	Rachel Caris Love	March 9, 2018	T30.10014	3.03
The team investigates the seemingly unrelated drug deaths of several Marines. After being caught in an explosion, Patterson is severely injured and lapses into a coma. Within her subconscious, she relives the events of the day over and over again, doomed to do so until she solves the case. While sifting through the clues, she interacts with visions of various figures from her past, including David, Borden, Stuart, Roman, and Director Pellington, who help her deal with the guilt she feels for their deaths. Upon solving the case, she awakens and deduces that the Marines died during an unsanctioned covert operation and their deaths were being covered up by a Marine general. Patterson confides in Zapata that her vision of Borden was different from the others in some way; it is revealed that Borden is alive.
60	15	"Deductions"	Marisol Adler	Chris Pozzebon	March 16, 2018	T30.10015	3.40
Ex-Sandstorm member Cade appears at Jane and Weller's apartment, having escaped from a crashed black flight after being imprisoned by the CIA. He warns them that the other prisoners are planning an imminent attack in New York. With his intel, the FBI manages to identify the leader of the attack, a CIA agent named Quinn Bonita, who is seeking revenge on the CIA for her husband's death, and then stop her and the prisoners. Crawford is inclined to pay the ransom for Blake and Christophe, but Christophe's father, Jean-Paul, insists on taking them back by force. Roman goes along with Jean-Paul's team; when he sees Blake and Christophe are unguarded, he kills Jean-Paul's men and rescues Blake and Christophe. Later, Roman tells Crawford he realized that he, Crawford, had ordered the kidnapping himself to cement Jean-Paul's gratitude after the rescue. Roman explains he killed Jean-Paul's team to keep them from exposing Crawford's involvement and Crawford commends him for his loyalty. The body of Avery's adoptive father is dumped into a river by unknown men.
61	16	"Artful Dodge"	Martha Mitchell	Kristen Layden	March 23, 2018	T30.10016	3.27
The dragonfly tattoo clue forces Zapata to reveal that Borden is alive and working for the CIA to infiltrate a group of Serbian terrorists, and that she is his handler. The FBI captures Borden and injures one of the terrorists. Borden claims the terrorists are planning an imminent attack and gives the FBI an indecipherable flash drive. Interrogating the injured terrorist proves fruitless and Patterson starts to break down over Borden's return. After sparring with Rich, she realizes a nonsense phrase the injured man uttered was the key to deciphering the drive. Terrorists are planning to launch bunker-busting bombs on US cities. Despite Borden's cooperation, Zapata sends him to prison for good. Patterson tells Zapata they cannot be friends after her deception. Crawford confides his ultimate goal to Roman: a massive private army for his global peacekeeping force. Roman collapses; Crawford takes him to the hospital. Rich's deal with the FBI is canceled, but the decision is reversed when the team vouches for him. Zapata confesses to Reade that she is in love with him. Patterson shows the team an invitation to an event Roman sent her, which she believes is key to bringing down Crawford.
62	17	"Mum's the Word"	Jean de Segonzac	Christina M. Kim	March 30, 2018	T30.10017	2.93
The FBI team, along with Avery, goes undercover at a gala where Crawford plans to meet with Jean-Paul to conclude a land deal. There, Jane and Avery meet Roman, who explains his plan to help them record Crawford's deal and arrest both him and Jean-Paul. However, a passionate moment with Blake convinces Roman to double-cross the FBI so that he can keep his new life with Blake and her father. The FBI storms the gala and kills Jean-Paul, but Crawford escapes with Roman's help. Blake is shocked to discover her father's criminal activity and Crawford becomes suspicious of Roman. Patterson begins withholding information from Zapata at work, drawing a reprimand from Reade. Reade attempts to reconcile with Zapata as friends, but she refuses, saying she cannot be his best man or attend his wedding. As Jane, Weller, and Avery enjoy a family moment, Roman issues an order to a group of assassins to kill all the members of the FBI team.
63	18	"Clamorous Night"	Neema Barnette	Eric Buchman	April 20, 2018	T30.10018	2.72
After a hard day at work trying to trace Crawford's new location, the team decides to grab some rest. Unfortunately, each of them becomes a target of Roman's assassins. Jane and Weller are attacked in an exclusive restaurant, resulting in Jane getting kidnapped. Reade is attacked in his apartment after an argument with Millicent Van Der Waal, who was investigating him due to his connection to Hirst. Millicent is killed by the assassin sent for Reade, but he manages to save himself. Zapata attends a memorial service for her ex-boyfriend, Ricky, in a church and is attacked, but the assassin is killed with the help of Ricky's sister, a rookie police officer. Finally, Patterson and co-worker Jack are attacked during a date. They are saved by Zapata after injuring their attacker. The team reunites and, with the help of Rich, they get a profile on one of Jane's captors and manage to locate them and save Jane. After learning that his plan failed, Roman decides to kill the team himself, but a woman named Kira tells him to focus on Crawford's new plan instead.
64	19	"Galaxy of Minds"	Marcus Stokes	Ryan Johnson & Peter Lalayanis	April 27, 2018	T30.10019	2.69
A flashback shows that Avery's adoptive father was developing a sonic weapon for Crawford. In the present day, a tattoo clue leads the FBI team to a conspiracy theorist, Daschelle Watkins, who believes the government has created a mind-control device. With Watkins' help, they go looking for an engineer named Ganzman. Roman is also concurrently looking for Ganzman, who was involved with the sonic weapon. Both sides track Ganzman to rural New York. There, Roman is joined by Blake, who wants to spend some personal time with him, and he must conceal his true mission from her while hunting Ganzman. The FBI and Roman find Ganzman simultaneously and Roman kills him. Jane pursues Roman and Roman taunts that she will not shoot him; she does, but her weapon is out of ammo and he escapes. Avery accepts Jane and Weller's invitation to move in with them. Roman floods the Internet with misinformation regarding the tattoo clues, rendering them useless.
65	20	"Let It Go"	Maja Vrvilo	Rachel Caris Love	May 4, 2018	T30.10020	2.75
The FBI finds a clue in the body of Avery's adoptive father that leads them to one of Crawford's assassins, but Jane is forced to kill the man before he can be interrogated. Bill Nye is revealed to be Patterson's father and is brought on by the FBI to help her counter the effects of Roman's misinformation. Avery's godmother, Lynnette, invites Avery and Jane to sign some documents regarding her adoptive father's estate. Once there, Avery deduces that Lynnette works for Crawford and that she was seemingly involved with her adoptive father's death. Lynnette starts opening fire on both of them, but Avery and Jane barricade themselves inside a panic room. Weller and the rest of the FBI arrive and Jane signals for them to move in, causing the FBI to arrest a remorseful yet adamant Lynnette. Meg breaks up with Reade after learning about Zapata's feelings for him. Roman begins to hallucinate visions of Remi and an alternate version of himself while he devises a plan to thwart the FBI. On Lynnette's laptop, Patterson and Zapata discover secret access codes to numerous Manhattan buildings and realize that Crawford is planning an imminent attack.
66	21	"Defection"	David Tuttman	Anne Hecker & Kristen Layden	May 11, 2018	T30.10021	2.76
The team pressures Lynnette for Crawford's intended target, leading to stolen dinitrogen tetroxide. Jane recalls a Sandstorm bomb plan that mixes it with monomethylhydrazine (MMH). Shepherd will only reveal the location of the MMH if allowed to she speak with Jane. They track a delivery van to UN Headquarters. Reade and Zapata disarm the bomb while the building is evacuated. Rich and Patterson discover the intended targets are two African leaders engaged in peace talks, whom Crawford wants dead so his newly acquired land becomes the only route for an oil pipeline. UN protocols provide for a safe house for heads of state in a nearby hotel, where Roman intends to assassinate them. Jane and Weller must evacuate both leaders. Zapata is caught stealing one of the leader's phone for Keaton. Keaton fires her from the CIA, and she rejects an offer to rejoin the FBI to avoid compromising the team. Zapata and Reade give in to their feelings for each other. A newly decoded tattoo leads Patterson, Jane, and Weller to a video released by Roman; "One last game, Sis. Winner takes all."
67	22	"In Memory"	Martin Gero	Chris Pozzebon	May 18, 2018	T30.10022	2.98
The FBI team deciphers Roman's video, learning he is in Cape Town, South Africa. Zapata breaks up with Reade, saying it's the wrong time. Jane, Weller, and Reade travel to Jane's and Roman's former home, discovering clues to Roman's location. Roman kidnaps Crawford and brings him to the orphanage. Crawford reveals he built it to create soldiers for his army. The FBI arrives. Crawford delays them while Roman escapes. Weller is shot. Jane is forced to kill Crawford. Roman meets Blake, who now knows his true identity; Blake shoots him. Roman calls someone, entrusting his money and his mission to the unrevealed person. Jane arrives and comforts him as he dies. He bequeaths a necklace to Jane, containing new tattoo clues, and information about the detrimental effects of ZIP poisoning. Jane displays symptoms and is hospitalized. Blake flies away with Zapata, who says "This is how we take the power back. This is how we change the world." Jane wakes in the hospital, having reverted to her former "Remi" persona. Remi, learning Jane is married to Weller and that he is recovering from major surgery, smiles, realizing she is perfectly positioned to destroy the FBI from within.

=== Season 4 (2018–19) ===
Martin Gero stated that "the puzzle is a homage to some [of] our favorite TV series and how they title the shows." The first letters of each television series spells out the hidden phrase "Is This The Death of the FBI".

No. overall	No. in season	Title	Directed by	Written by	Original release date	Prod. code	US viewers (millions)
68	1	"Hella Duplicitous"	Martin Gero	Rachel Caris Love	October 12, 2018	T30.10051	2.95
In Tokyo, the team retrieves one of Roman's data caches revealed by the necklace he gave to Jane before dying. It reveals that ZIP poisoning is slowly killing Remi. Symptoms include hallucinations of Roman, who encourages her to take down the FBI. Remi contacts former Sandstorm operative Dolan Osmond, and she triggers an old tattoo that leads the team to a criminal bank containing 200-million dollars. Remi raids the vault to fund a Sandstorm resurgence. The FBI tracks Dolan's cell phone, and a car chase ensues which kills Dolan. Remi's contact with Dolan alerts the team that there is another active Sandstorm operative; herself, unbeknownst to the team. Remi's hallucination of Roman makes her promise to find a cure, and kill Weller to avenge Sandstorm. In Zurich, Zapata and Blake try to gain control over her father's company at a board meeting. Madeline Burke poisons Blake and the other board members to take control of HCI Global. She spares Zapata's life, as long as she remains a useful asset.
69	2	"My Art Project"	Adam Salky	Christina M. Kim	October 19, 2018	T30.10052	2.52
Rich notices that part of the mural in the FBI office resembles one of Jane's tattoos, which leads the team to a Russian spy who has been working in the U.S. as a double agent for NSA's Zero Division for years. The team also enlists the help of Boston, making Rich compete with his ex-boyfriend for all of the attention. Remi plans to find and release Shepherd from her imprisonment, so she convinces the spy to give her a flash drive that contains files of CIA black sites in exchange for information on his family, whom he thought was dead. Remi sets everything up so that it looks like she is being held as a hostage, and Weller ends up killing the spy, but not before she gets the information within the flash drive partially downloaded. She later talks to her hallucination of Roman as she prepares a lethal poison she intends to use on Weller. Meanwhile, Burke and Zapata fly to the home of Crawford's lawyer Kira Evans in Stockholm to get a hard drive containing all of the company's files. Zapata retrieves it, but Burke comes in and kills Kira, leaving Zapata to clean it up.
70	3	"The Quantico Affair"	David Tuttman	Chad McQuay & Chris Pozzebon	October 26, 2018	T30.10053	2.50
Remi can't bring herself to kill Weller. Under pressure, she reveals the poison needle, but lies, saying it's for when her ZIP poisoning becomes unbearable. Patterson has a one night stand with Lincoln. The next day, she leads a group of Quantico shadow recruits, and is shocked when Lincoln is among them; worse, he is also FBI Director Matthew Weitz's nephew. Reade, Weller and Remi apprehend terrorist bomber Ted Henwood. The team also discovers Henwood's partner-in-terrorism, Larry Mills. Madeline Burke gives the FBI Crawford's files that she retrieved in Stockholm, which helps them locate Mills, who was planning to blow up a rival company's building by using subway trains. Burke ordered the attacks, but uses the FBI to gain the trust of the public through the media. Rich convinces Patterson to search for the Book of Secrets. Later that night, Remi meets with a woman and pays her in advance. Weller, who has been following Remi, takes a picture of the mysterious woman.
71	4	"Sous-Vide"	Aric Avelino	Eric Buchman	November 2, 2018	T30.10054	2.43
Remi hires Boston to hack the FBI to reveal the location of the black site holding Shepherd. Rich solves a tattoo that leads the team to an abandoned hospital used as a hideout to store smuggled dolls. Patterson investigates what the dolls may contain. Weller asks Allie to investigate the mysterious woman Remi met. Patterson realizes too late that the doll released a spore-born pathogen. She locks down the building in an emergency quarantine, with Rich, Patterson, and Reade trapped in the lab and Remi trapped in the office. A biohazard team is sent to remedy the situation, but Colonel Beck is the one who created the bio-weapon, and he is now experimenting on the trapped FBI agents to test its efficacy. Weller and Remi confront and arrest him. In Amsterdam, Burke tasks Zapata and Claudia Murphy to get information from the FBI using Reade's access. They sneak into Reade's New York apartment, but are unable to access Reade's computer because of the lockdown. That evening, Reade comes home and is attacked by Claudia. He subdues her, but Zapata holds him at gunpoint.
72	5	"Naughty Monkey Kicks at Tree"	Chris Place	Rachel Caris Love	November 9, 2018	T30.10055	2.69
Zapata and Claudia tie-up Reade and interrogate him about the access code to his computer. Reade finally gives the code after Claudia threatens to kill Zapata. Meanwhile, Weller tasks Patterson to look into Violet Parks, who is revealed to have ties to the black market. Later, a tattoo leads the team to a notorious assassin who works for an ecoterrorist group. When captured, the assassin instantly recognizes Rich as "Jackson Fernwood". Back in his criminal days, one of Rich's many scam victims included environmentalist groups, among them the ecoterrorists, who are still unaware that he works for the FBI. At Remi's insistence, Weller asks Keaton from the CIA to help with the mission. The terrorists are planning an attack on New York City, so the team sends Rich undercover, with Weller posing as his assistant. The attack is thwarted, but Keaton is shot and put into a medically-induced coma. Remi meets with Violet and fills her in about the possible location of Shepherd, which Keaton revealed to her. Zapata and Claudia give Reade's computer files to Burke. Zapata shoots Claudia to cover up her close ties to Reade and provides Burke evidence proving that Claudia was a mole from MI6, earning her complete trust.
73	6	"Ca-Ca-Candidate for Cri-Cri-Crime"	Andi Armaganian	Chris Pozzebon	November 16, 2018	T30.10056	2.54
The team solves a tattoo after the murder of a congressman who contacted director Weitz a few hours before his death. The tattoo points to a powerful lobby group with conspiracy secrets. Meanwhile, Reade is interrogated by a CIA official, Sabrina Larren, about giving Zapata his FBI password. The interrogation results in him being fired by Weitz, who later shows up at Reade's apartment and reveals that he only fired Reade so the FBI can go after Zapata themselves, and recruits Reade for the job. Burke plots to ruin a company she is competing against for a defense contract, so she tasks Zapata to blackmail one of the company's engineers into taking pictures of a top-secret research project. At the end of the day, Weller follows the signal of a tracker he put in Remi's pocket to a hideout, resulting in a brief shootout with Violet. He returns home and confronts Remi about the secrets she is hiding.
74	7	"Case: Sun, Moon and the Truth"	Andy Mikita	Ryan Johnson & Peter Lalayanis	November 30, 2018	T30.10057	2.65
Remi's and Kurt's argument escalates as their apartment is raided by Eve, the owner of the criminal bank the FBI raided. She wants her money back. Failing that, Eve forces them to break into the FBI facility with explosive devices strapped to their vests to recover an item for Eve's terrorist clients. Kurt reveals he knows she is no longer Jane, but has reverted to Remi. Remi betrays Kurt and gives Eve the item in order to escape. Kurt blows up the item remotely using the explosives he removed from the vests, killing Eve and her goons in the process. Zapata must find a hacker named Del Toro to crash a plane designed by Burke's rival in order to receive a defense contract. Zapata learns Del Toro is in Mexico. Reade and Weitz also learn this through files reluctantly provided by Burke. Patterson and Rich work on a clue leading to another of Roman's data caches, hidden inside Derek Wimble's ID badge. They find medical information that could help cure Jane. Kurt gets a call from Remi, who is determined to go through with her plans. Kurt replies he will not stop fighting to get back his wife Jane.
75	8	"Screech, Thwack, Pow"	David Tuttman	Kate Sargeant Curtis	December 7, 2018	T30.10058	2.81
Weller informs Patterson and Rich about Jane being Remi again. As they try to track her down, NORAD receives word of an impending ballistic missile headed for New York, resulting in mass panic. Weller's team determines that NORAD had been hacked by Boston, who was being led on pretenses by Remi to force the CIA to move Shepherd, who then kidnaps him to clear traffic. She intercepts the CIA convoy transporting Shepherd, resulting in a firefight in which Violet is killed. Once at a safehouse, Shepherd admits to Remi that she knew of the risks of her ZIP poisoning and mentions that Roman had located a scientist named Kallisto who might be able to cure her. At the same time, Patterson tells Weller of a risky treatment that may bring back Jane's personality. With Rich's help, he lures Remi into a trap and begins to fight her. Meanwhile, Reade and Weitz travel to Mexico, where Zapata and Burke negotiate with a Mexican cartel leader for Del Toro's services. Just after Burke orders Zapata to retrieve Del Toro from Toronto, she is cornered by Reade and Weitz.
76	9	"Check Your Ed"	David McWhirter	Brendan Gall	January 11, 2019	T30.10059	3.03
While fighting, Weller manages to sedate Remi by injecting a needle in her. He brings her to the FBI and a special doctor is brought in to help Patterson and Rich to try the experimental procedure they found on Roman's data caches. Inside Jane's mind, she's seen remembering most of her past and being helped by visions of Weller and the team to fight visions of Roman and Shepherd, leading to a final confrontation with Remi. She manages to convince Remi that Shepherd is their true common enemy. Jane finally wakes up, fully back to being herself, and is reunited with Weller, Patterson, and Rich. Shepherd, who everyone thinks has escaped, arrives at Jane and Weller's apartment, attacking Weller as he walks in, but Jane appears and shoots her dead. The next day, the team is preparing to work, but they are surprised to see a handcuffed Zapata, being led away by Reade for interrogation.
77	10	"The Big Reveal"	Joy T. Lane	Matt Young	January 18, 2019	T30.10060	3.05
Patterson and Rich identify Kallisto as Dr. Nora Lee Roga, the original creator of ZIP, who supposedly died two years ago. The team questions her son, Clay, and finds evidence that Nora is alive. Managing to find Nora's safe house, they learn that Roman sent her into hiding after her assistant was assassinated on orders of her pharmaceutical company, which had continued selling ZIP despite the fatal side effects. She reveals that Roman procured stem cells required to cure Jane, but all the samples are destroyed in the subsequent attack by a hit squad. After fending off the attack and allowing Nora to return to her son, she mentions that Roman was searching for more stem cells. Meanwhile, Reade, under pressure from the CIA to hand over Zapata, gets her to confess that Keaton never fired her but sent her under deep cover to infiltrate and dismantle HCI Global. Deciding to let her complete her mission for Burke, Reade declares himself her new handler and ends whatever relationship they had. However, upon arriving in Toronto, Zapata is captured by the CIA.
78	11	"Careless Whisper"	Mark Tonderai	Eric Buchman	February 1, 2019	T30.10061	2.85
The murder of a best-selling crime novelist sends Jane and the team in search of a serial killer detailed in the author's final manuscript, which also features fictional caricatures of FBI team members. Someone inside the FBI had been leaking personal information about the team to the writer for his book, whom Reade discovers is junior agent Briana. The team discovers the killer is a real person, but not the original suspect. Jane starts to lose her vision as she is captured by the killer and held, pending her murder. Jane sends a message in Morse code through Patterson's medical monitor bracelet. Kurt and the team rush to find Jane's location, as Jane fights blind against the killer. At the hospital after having had a grand mal seizure, Paterson reveals Jane is now heading towards the final stages of the ZIP poisoning with only days remaining. Zapata is rescued from the CIA by Madeline's henchman, Dominic Masters. Heading back to the meeting point, Zapata finds a ringing cell phone on the floor. Del Toro declines the job, but Zapata, realizing her cover has not yet been blown, tells Dominic she was successful.
79	12	"The Tale of the Book of Secrets"	R.T. Thorne	Rachel Caris Love	February 8, 2019	T30.10062	3.51
Thanks to another data cache, Patterson and Rich identify billionaire Ken Lee, who owns the stem cells needed to cure Jane. Lee wants the Book of Secrets in return for the stem cells, which leads Patterson and Rich to a treasure hunt throughout Peru, following the last bits of Roman's trail. They find the missing information that Roman wasn't able to find by himself. Over in the mountains of Machu Picchu, Rich digs up the Book of Secrets from the ground. It is revealed that Lee was planning to double-cross them, but Weller and the team were one step ahead and have the local police stop him. Defeated, Lee accepts a deal: the stem cells for house arrest. Upon retrieving the cells, Jane is cured and her sight is restored. Meanwhile, Zapata takes Boston in place of Del Toro. Madeline, not fully convinced that he is their hacker, tasks him to perform the airplane hack for later that day. Zapata and Boston become worried.
80	13	"Though This Be Madness, Yet There Is Method In't"	Ramaa Mosley	Christina M. Kim	February 15, 2019	T30.10063	2.90
Zapata urges Boston to hack the ARVO aeronautic system without doing any real harm to the plane. Complicating matters, the real Del Toro arrives. Madeline is alerted, so Boston tries to save those onboard. Garret Young, head of security for Bradley Dynamics, HCI Global's rival, reveals the plane is the new Air Force One. They discover that Weitz is also aboard. Zapata kills Del Toro; Boston takes control of the computer to prevent the plane from crashing. Zapata discovers that Madeline had her henchman Dominic plant explosives throughout the building. After the explosion, Zapata disappears while Madeline and Dominic escape. The FBI house arrest on Boston is lifted, and Reade offers him a job, which he declines. Burke goes into hiding to initiate Operation Helios. Jane and Kurt receive an envelope from Shepherd's estate lawyer, containing a picture puzzle for her to solve. To show her loyalty, Zapata calls Reade to say she is heading to Zurich to retrieve files that contain evidence against Madeline. In Zurich, she gets the files but is attacked by an unknown woman.
81	14	"The Big Blast From the Past Episode"	Kristin Windell	Kate Sargeant Curtis	March 8, 2019	T30.10064	3.16
Zapata returns to tell Reade about her failed mission after her attacker stopped her from uploading the files to her phone. Later, the team faces a series of bombings that happen in the same locations as an old case, back when Jane went into hiding in a monastery. With the woman responsible in prison, everything points to a copycat. The FBI receives a call from the copycat, claiming that Lilly, the woman imprisoned, was set up by someone from the team. A flashback reveals that it was Weitz who pressured Stuart to alter evidence from a video that showed Lilly dropping off a package to the site of one of the bombings. A new lead points the team to suspect Lilly's father. Weitz blocks them from making an arrest and authorizes a drone strike to take him out to cover his tracks. Just as he thinks he is clear, Weitz receives a call from the real copycat, who is revealed to be Dominic. He threatens to expose Weitz unless he cooperates for a favor. Patterson shows up at Weller and Jane's apartment with news that she had solved the puzzle Shepherd left; it revealed a 3D printing code that produced a special key. Jane claims to know exactly what it opens.
82	15	"Frequently Recurring Struggle For Existence"	Martha Mitchell	Matt Young	March 15, 2019	T30.10065	2.62
The key that Shepherd left is revealed to open a Sandstorm stash full of items that meant something to Jane, back when she was Remi. A tattoo points to the recent robbery of a box full of plutonium by a Russian terrorist group. The terrorists plan to sell the box to potential buyers, one of them is Cameron, a former military officer and Remi's protégé, who she manipulated in the past following orders from Shepherd. He wants to create a dirty bomb that will detonate in a military meeting as a means to avenge his firing. A guilt-ridden Jane confesses to him that she was the one responsible for getting him fired in the first place. An unstable Cameron aims to detonate the device anyhow but is shot by Weller. Meanwhile, Keaton awakens from his coma. He tells Zapata that he has proof of everything that he had tasked her with, which could clear her name, though she wants to find a way to clear both her and Keaton. Patterson discovers that the surveillance cameras installed in front of the Sandstorm stash show an unknown person who had accessed it a day before the FBI.
83	16	"The One Where Jane Visits An Old Friend"	Jean de Segonzac	Eric Buchman	March 22, 2019	T30.10066	2.96
Jane goes to Borden for help with dealing with her sins as Remi and he helps her understand that she and Remi are the same. Meanwhile, the team deals with a cartel hitman targeting HCI Global executives in revenge for the death of Del Toro. Burke takes advantage of this crisis after the hitman is caught by killing any executive who could testify against her. Zapata leads the team to Burke's pilot but he purposely misleads them so Burke could escape via medical helicopter. Nonetheless, Zapata can capture Burke but Masters manages to sedate and abduct Jane.
84	17	"The Night of the Dying Breath"	Jeff T. Thomas	Chris Pozzebon	April 5, 2019	T30.10067	2.89
Masters demands Burke's immediate release, having buried Jane in a wooden box. With Burke's lawyer laying on the pressure, Weller and the team scramble to find her before Jane runs out of air. Zapata manages to leverage Burke by threatening to leak her son's indiscretions that Zapata covered up for Madeline, forcing Burke to reveal the location of Masters' cabin; Weller finds Jane buried near it. Afterward, Reade sends Burke to prison, but her lawyer meets with Masters to instruct him to proceed with Helios.
85	18	"'Ohana"	Sudz Sutherland	Sabrina Deana-Roga & Anne Hecker	April 12, 2019	T30.10068	2.86
A hit on one of the tattoos points to a lethal bacteria that caused many deaths by poisoning, which leads the team to a facility where Patterson's father, Bill Nye, is working as a consultant. Meanwhile, Zapata gets a call from Claudia, who is also trying to find a Masters. Claudia is later found dead after following a potential lead on her own. Jane and Weller continue digging into the identity of the person who had entered the Sandstorm stash. A business card found in the stash points to a shelter for women which Shepherd once visited, looking for a woman named "Jessica", who owned a jacket like the one the mysterious person was wearing in the video. A sketch of "Jessica" is passed to Jane and Weller, who both immediately recognize the woman as Weller's mother.
86	19	"Everybody Hates Kathy"	David McWhirter	Kate Sargeant Curtis	April 19, 2019	T30.10069	2.97
An office party is raided by the FBI due to a data breach. The breach gives Patterson a new tattoo hit, pointing to a classified project: a secret satellite armed with nukes. Meanwhile, Jane and Weller head to Pennsylvania to question Weller's drug-addicted mother Linda, who reveals that she knew Shepherd, and Jane realizes that she had been used to gain intel on Weller. Jane convinces Weller to make amends with his mother, so he pays a drug debt she had and checks her into rehab. Patterson and Rich discover that Kathy was released from prison on good behavior. Reade sends them to find her after finding that Kathy had hacked a bank. When they find Kathy, she reveals that she is getting married. Patterson and Rich try to bribe her to promise to stop hacking and keep their identities secret, by paying a large sum of money for her wedding. It is revealed that Kathy's fiancé is Masters, who is using her to complete the Helios plan.
87	20	"Coder to Killer"	Martha Mitchell	Ryan Johnson & Peter Lalayanis	May 24, 2019	T30.10070	2.81
Terrorist Sho Akhtar, now in prison, wants to contact the team about information he possesses on an impending terrorist attack. It is revealed to be a plot by Sho to escape once again, with the help of a fellow Russian terrorist with a personal vendetta. Meanwhile, Masters calls Briana and threatens to kill her family if she doesn't cooperate with the Helios Plan. Briana is seen breaking into Jane and Weller's apartment to steal an item from their safe.
88	21	"Masters of War 1:5 – 8"	Amanda Tapping	Matt Young	May 31, 2019	T30.10071	2.49
The team follows a lead on Barry Wallace, a former CIA agent and an associate of Madeline Burke who is working with Masters on the Helios project. After being captured, Barry is killed in an attack orchestrated by Masters. The team is forced to bring Burke for questioning, but she remains uncooperative. She finally gives Masters' private phone number to be hacked. The team finds and guns down Masters, but they unsuccessfully try to stop the plan: a computer virus is released into the system of a power grid that controls the Eastern Seaboard and the whole country is thrown into chaos after the power is cut.
89	22	"The Gang Gets Gone"	David McWhirter	Chris Pozzebon	May 31, 2019	T30.10072	2.05
The disruption of the power grid continues to spread across the country, while divisions within the team become evident as several secrets come out. The team track Kathy to Iceland, and then fly there (minus Rich) to stop the power hack. They arrive to find it was a trap designed to incriminate them, but with help from a contact of Rich, Ice Cream, they escape and all meet up at a remote cottage. In New York, Rich tries to help the team and decrypt a Helios file. Before he can finish, Madeline, with the assistance of Lucas Nash, and later her lawyer Richard Shirley, turn the tables on Director Weitz and force him to release her and recant the charges. As Madeline's intentions to destroy the FBI become evident, there are mounting accusations that the team has gone rogue, and Nash arranges a drone strike that destroys the cottage, with everyone except Jane still inside.

=== Season 5 (2020) ===
Each episode title in the fifth season contains a word featured in The Gashlycrumb Tinies, a macabre abecedarium. Using the letters from that work accordingly, the season's message is "DRNK YR OVLTN", a reference to secret decoder rings, and specifically the message to "Drink your Ovaltine", decoded by Ralphie in A Christmas Story. Gero and puzzle consultant David Kwong noted that this was the only season puzzle that, as far as they know, went unsolved.

No. overall	No. in season	Title	Directed by	Written by	Original release date	Prod. code	US viewers (millions)
90	1	"I Came to Sleigh"	Mark Pellington	Chris Pozzebon	May 7, 2020	T30.10251	2.14
Two months after the drone strike, Jane, Kurt, Patterson and Zapata are in hiding, while Reade was killed in the strike and Rich remains in CIA custody. A display of one of Jane's tattoos in Times Square prompts Madeline to reinforce her search for the team, who come together as Patterson decodes the image to reveal a message identifying where Rich is being held and that he is about to be transferred. Having identified the black site, the team contact Sho Akhtar for help, as he has blueprints of the site (which he intended to use as his brother was held there, only for Akhtar's brother to be murdered before he could be saved). With Jane as a hostage, Akhtar gives them details of his planned breakout in exchange for the confirmed death of the CIA interrogator who assaulted his brother; Kurt compromises by cutting off the man's hand to fake his death. Back at the FBI, Madeline forces Weitz to sign papers authorising her use of mercenaries/"civilian contractors" to find the team, and demonstrates an unspecified lethal gas weapon to someone on her team.
91	2	"We Didn't Start the Fire"	Kristin Windell	Eric Buchman	May 14, 2020	T30.10252	1.87
Jane and the team reach out to Patterson's father in the hope of gaining access to a high-level conference in Finland where they hope to bring Matthew Weitz to their side, as well as try to defuse a bomb without being found out by Madeline. Madeline meanwhile forces Brianna to find out who within the FBI office is helping the team and to notify her immediately once she finds out. She also forces Weitz to hire Ivy Sands and other members of the terrorist group Dabbur Zhan to help search for the team and get rid of them once and for all.
92	3	"Existential Ennui"	Joy T. Lane	Ryan Johnson & Peter Lalayanis	May 28, 2020	T30.10253	1.81
When an op goes bad, the team must deal with a proverbial monster in their house before it can take them down one by one, as well finding out that Madeline is working with Dabbur Zhan to search for them. They later find out that their prisoner is the leader of the Dabbur Zhan. Meanwhile, Director Weitz is forced into a tense game of psychological chess as Madeline Burke attempts to assess his loyalty and root out a potential mole at the FBI. She later kills Brianna in front of him to prove that he must do as she asks or she will kill him too. Weitz tells Afreen that they must stop helping the team, because Madeline is closing in on them.
93	4	"And My Axe!"	America Young	Matt Young	June 4, 2020	T30.10254	1.98
The team is able crack a hidden memory card found on Hades and find plans for a bomb that Madeline plans to use, the same one that Weller and Jane were trying to prevent Eve from retrieving at the FBI evidence warehouse. Zapata remembers this as being part of a bust from her first day at the FBI, though she can't recall the details. With Patterson's help, she becomes able to remember the details, which leads them to a scientist who was responsible for creating a deadly chemical gas that Madeline intends to use in the bomb. It's later revealed that there are ten bombs in total, that are set to go off in ten major global cities. Zapata finds out that she's pregnant and finds it hard to recall the past, because it reminds her of when she first met Reade. The team is able to stop Ivy and the scientist, but not before Weller is kidnapped and Jane is shot in the abdomen.
94	5	"Head Games"	Pamela Romanowsky	Brendan Gall	June 11, 2020	T30.10255	1.83
Jane makes her way back to the bunker and informs the team about Weller being taken. The team finds out about Jane's injury and works quickly to save her before focusing on finding Weller, who's being tortured with hallucinagenic drugs by Ivy in an effort to learn the location of the team's hideout. The team finds out about Zapata's pregnancy before she agrees to give Jane a blood transfusion. While Rich goes out of the bunker to find blood, Jane coaches Zapata and Patterson on how to surgically remove the bullet. Weller breaks free and escapes only to see Zapata, and thinking he's still being tortured/hallucinating, threatens to shoot her. He eventually finds out she's the real thing and gives Zapata the memory card for a video camera, hoping he didn't reveal too much information. The team is found by Ice Cream, who forces them to find The Gardner paintings that were promised to him by Rich if Ice Cream helped to hide the team.
95	6	"Fire & Brimstone"	Dermott Downs	Rachel Caris Love	June 18, 2020	T30.10256	1.82
Ice Cream tells the team that if they steal the paintings for them, he will give them intel he's got on Madeline, as a result of her using a messaging app that he created. He will give them backdoor access to the app that will allow them to monitor her communications with Ivy, without them both knowing and therefore they can find out more about where Madeline plans to release the bombs. To make sure they don't double-cross him, Ice Cream applies tracking monitors to the team that he'll remotely set off and inform the authorities of their location. Jane and Kurt head to the home of the current owner of the paintings, but after a shootout, the owner dies. His death releases a video on the dark web and now the team races to find the paintings before anyone else does. Meanwhile Weitz is forced by Richard Shirley to take down Susan Shah, the speaker that was supposed to die at the conference in Finland. If he doesn't, Shirley will have her killed. With the intel the team receives from Ice Cream, they find that Madeline's plan is to weaponize ZIP and use to erase a city's population's memories.
96	7	"Awl In"	Ramaa Mosley	Anne Hecker	June 25, 2020	T30.10257	1.86
The team continues to monitor Madeline and Ivy's communications, and uses clues to find Madeline's ZIP production in a Kyrgyzstan lab. Instead of traveling there physically, Rich uses the Bumpkey Virus (from "Masters of War 1:5 – 8") to destroy the ZIP remotely by increasing the temperature. They learn there are more two more caches of ZIP already produced. Rich and Zapata travel to Libya, while Jane and Kurt head to Hungary, to denature the ZIP rendering it harmless, and to plant trackers on the canisters to gather evidence against Madeline. Madeline brings Allie into the FBI office to coerce her into revealing the team's location by threatening their daughter Bethany. Jane and Kurt are successful, but Zapata barely escapes without planting the tracker or denaturing the ZIP. However, she is successful in planting a seed of doubt in Gregory Burke's mind. Allie is televised, pleading with Kurt to turn himself in, but sends a code signal urging him to proceed with his mission. Madeline ZIP's her son's memory after he questions her concerning his father's death. Keaton is revealed as the one responsible for sending the team anonymous messages to bring down Madeline.
97	8	"Ghost Train"	Martha Mitchell	Eric Buchman	July 2, 2020	T30.10258	1.86
Ivy tortures someone for information, but Madeline finds another means. Weller watches Allie's broadcast repeatedly for hidden meaning. An anonymous message is sent with Jane's Cerberus tattoo. Weitz asks Afreen to hack Shirley's computer to find other blackmail victims; Afreen corrupts all of Madeline's blackmail files. The ZIP is tracked from Tangier towards an undetermined American port. Patterson triangulates the message signal to Malta. Zapata goes to Malta to meet Keaton, but Madeline is informed by Interpol of her location. Keaton, pressured to keep his family safe, gives up Zapata to Madeline. Madeline has Keaton killed when he tries to double-cross her. Jane and Kurt try leaving to intercept the ZIP shipment, but Ivy's forces are already raiding the bunker using Czech Policemen as shields to capture them alive. Patterson rigs her servers to destroy them with thermite, but becomes trapped inside as the thermite it set off. Rich is captured outside the server room, forced to watch as Patterson is seemingly killed inside the server room. The team is brought back to the New York FBI office, and Madeline holds a press release blaming them for all of her own attacks.
98	9	"Brass Tacks"	Chris Place	Matt Young	July 9, 2020	T30.10259	2.37
Madeline gives each team member a chance to confess to the attacks in return for Federal prison time, rather than a CIA black site. Just as Boston is about to be arrested, he is saved by Patterson, who escaped her server room via ducts. She sends a coded message to Afreen for access into the FBI office, where she gets incriminating evidence against Madeline to send to Meg for publication. Jane accepts Madeline's offer to confess to save the others, but stops when Morse code is sent to the camera's recording light by Patterson and Boston. Weitz, Patterson, and Rich free the others. Patterson triggers an evacuation so they can find Jane, but they're caught by Dabbur Zhan. Weitz returns with loyal FBI agents, and a firefight kills the Dabbur Zhan; Weitz is mortally wounded. Madeline flees in her private jet, but Shirley tips Zapata who demands the location of the ZIP bombs. Madeline declares she's proud of her accomplishments before drinking poison-laced champagne. Shirley goes to Ivy and attempts to help, but Ivy kills him.
99	10	"Love You to Bits and Bytes"	Jean de Segonzac	Chris Pozzebon	July 9, 2020	T30.10260	1.78
With Madeline and Weitz gone, the FBI is left leaderless, but they stand behind Weller. They search for Ivy and the ZIP canisters. Patterson and Rich realize Kathy was Madeline's hacker. Ivy enlists Kathy to find the ZIP, but Kathy goes to the FBI claiming she doesn't wants to help Ivy erase everyone's memory. Kathy tries hacking Madeline's Darkcloud, but is thwarted by Boston who Ivy is forcing at gunpoint. Rich, Patterson, and Kathy go to save Boston, who is now standing on a pressure plate bomb. To defuse the bomb, Kathy switches places with Boston, but then claims it can't be diffused. She pretends to sacrifice herself and let the bomb go off, only to use it as a means of escape. Interim FBI Director Arla Grigoryan, arrives and demands that Jane, Weller and Zapata stand down from following Ivy. They disobey the order and try to stop Ivy from preparing the ZIP bombs. They're too late; Ivy escapes, Jane is trapped, and the ZIP gas is released. To prevent Kurt from being exposed to the gas, Jane closes the airlock doors, trapping her inside as Kurt watches helplessly.
100	11	"Iunne Ennui"	Martin Gero	Martin Gero	July 23, 2020	T30.10261	1.70
Jane wakes to find Patterson's ZIP antidote worked. Grigoryan says the President granted immunity, but they cannot work for the U.S. government. Ivy escapes with one canister, and meets with Jesse Thomas to make a "dirty" ZIP bomb to increase the radius. Grigoryan allows them to close the case, but "by the book." As she tries to stop Ivy, Jane begins hallucinating; Weitz, Blake, Oscar, Pellington, Reade, Wagner, Keaton, Carter, Shepherd, Cade, Madeline, Hirst, Roman, Crawford, Dolan, Markos, Akhtar, Murphy, Guerrero, et al. Jane finds Thomas too late; Ivy left with the bomb. Jane receives more antidote, but stops, realizing her subconscious (Dr. Borden) is helping remember Ivy's target; Times Square. Zapata arrests Ivy. Patterson and Rich help Jane and Kurt disarm the bomb. Grigoryan thanks them for their service as everyone congratulates them. Kurt and Jane foster children, Patterson and Rich quest for the Newtonian alchemist's device, Zapata bears a daughter and starts a P.I. firm. As they celebrate, Kurt muses, one wrong wire and this dinner never happened. The scene shifts back-and-forth between Times Square, where Jane is zipped up inside a body bag, and dinner, where she is asked, "You OK?" and Jane replies, "I'm good."

== Ratings ==
Blindspot : U.S. viewers per episode (millions)

Season	Episode number																							Average
Season	1	2	3	4	5	6	7	8	9	10	11	12	13	14	15	16	17	18	19	20	21	22	23	Average
1	10.61	9.11	9.06	8.45	7.82	7.91	8.02	7.67	7.74	7.03	6.85	6.59	6.25	5.89	5.99	5.54	5.53	5.46	5.58	5.43	5.61	5.27	5.85	6.92
2	7.10	6.08	5.60	5.71	5.53	5.24	5.20	4.90	5.00	5.14	5.01	4.73	4.64	4.07	4.13	4.26	4.32	4.34	4.33	4.18	3.92	4.28	–	4.90
3	4.13	3.50	3.38	3.37	3.35	3.50	3.33	3.50	3.56	3.55	3.75	3.20	3.12	3.03	3.40	3.27	2.93	2.72	2.69	2.75	2.76	2.98	–	3.26
4	2.95	2.52	2.50	2.43	2.69	2.54	2.65	2.81	3.03	3.05	2.85	3.51	2.90	3.16	2.62	2.96	2.89	2.86	2.97	2.81	2.49	2.05	–	2.78
5	2.14	1.87	1.81	1.98	1.83	1.82	1.86	1.86	2.37	1.78	1.70	–												1.91

Audience measurement performed by Nielsen Media Research

=== Season 1 ===
Viewership and ratings per episode of List of Blindspot episodes
No.	Title	Air date	Rating/share (18–49)	Viewers (millions)	DVR (18–49)	DVR viewers (millions)	Total (18–49)	Total viewers (millions)
1	"Woe Has Joined"	September 21, 2015	3.1/10	10.61	1.9	5.98	5.0	16.59
2	"A Stray Howl"	September 28, 2015	2.6/8	9.11	2.0	6.02	4.6	15.12
3	"Eight Slim Grins"	October 5, 2015	2.4/8	9.06	1.9	5.65	4.3	14.71
4	"Bone May Rot"	October 12, 2015	2.5/8	8.45	1.7	5.34	4.2	13.79
5	"Split the Law"	October 19, 2015	2.1/7	7.82	1.9	5.61	4.0	13.43
6	"Cede Your Soul"	October 26, 2015	2.1/7	7.91	1.8	5.40	3.9	13.31
7	"Sent on Tour"	November 2, 2015	2.2/7	8.02	1.8	5.40	4.0	13.42
8	"Persecute Envoys"	November 9, 2015	2.2/7	7.67	1.8	5.52	4.0	13.19
9	"Authentic Flirt"	November 16, 2015	2.1/7	7.74	1.7	5.23	3.8	12.97
10	"Evil Handmade Instrument"	November 23, 2015	1.9/6	7.03	1.6	5.16	3.5	12.19
11	"Cease Forcing Enemy"	February 29, 2016	1.8/6	6.85	1.5	4.80	3.3	11.64
12	"Scientists Hollow Fortune"	March 7, 2016	1.7/6	6.59	1.5	4.54	3.2	11.13
13	"Erase Weary Youth"	March 14, 2016	1.6/5	6.25	1.4	4.40	3.0	10.65
14	"Rules in Defiance"	March 21, 2016	1.5/5	5.89	1.4	4.39	2.9	10.28
15	"Older Cutthroat Canyon"	March 28, 2016	1.6/5	5.99	1.3	4.21	2.9	10.20
16	"Any Wounded Thief"	April 4, 2016	1.3/4	5.54	1.2	3.89	2.5	9.43
17	"Mans Telepathic Loyal Lookouts"	April 11, 2016	1.4/5	5.53	1.1	3.88	2.5	9.41
18	"One Begets Technique"	April 18, 2016	1.3/4	5.46	1.2	3.84	2.5	9.30
19	"In the Comet of Us"	April 25, 2016	1.4/5	5.58	1.2	3.94	2.6	9.52
20	"Swift Hardhearted Stone"	May 2, 2016	1.3/4	5.43	1.2	3.90	2.5	9.32
21	"Of Whose Uneasy Route"	May 9, 2016	1.3/5	5.61	1.2	3.73	2.5	9.34
22	"If Love a Rebel, Death Will Render"	May 16, 2016	1.3/4	5.27	1.2	3.94	2.5	9.21
23	"Why Await Life's End"	May 23, 2016	1.3/4	5.85	1.2	3.84	2.5	9.69

=== Season 2 ===
Viewership and ratings per episode of List of Blindspot episodes
No.	Title	Air date	Rating/share (18–49)	Viewers (millions)	DVR (18–49)	DVR viewers (millions)	Total (18–49)	Total viewers (millions)
1	"In Night So Ransomed Rogue"	September 14, 2016	1.5/6	7.10	—N/a	—N/a	—N/a	—N/a
2	"Heave Fiery Knot"	September 21, 2016	1.3/5	6.08	1.0	3.02	2.3	9.10
3	"Hero Fears Imminent Rot"	September 28, 2016	1.3/5	5.60	0.9	2.90	2.2	8.51
4	"If Beth"	October 5, 2016	1.3/5	5.71	0.9	2.91	2.2	8.62
5	"Condone Untidiest Thefts"	October 12, 2016	1.1/4	5.53	0.8	2.65	1.9	8.19
6	"Her Spy's Harmed"	October 19, 2016	1.2/4	5.24	0.8	2.80	2.0	8.04
7	"Resolves Eleven Myths"	October 26, 2016	1.1/4	5.20	0.8	2.65	1.9	7.85
8	"We Fight Deaths on Thick Lone Waters"	November 9, 2016	1.0/4	4.90	—N/a	—N/a	—N/a	—N/a
9	"Why Let Cooler Pasture Deform"	November 16, 2016	1.1/4	5.00	0.8	2.54	1.9	7.54
10	"Nor I, Nigel, AKA Leg In Iron"	January 4, 2017	1.1/4	5.14	0.7	2.35	1.8	7.49
11	"Droll Autumn, Unmutual Lord"	January 11, 2017	1.0/4	5.01	0.8	2.64	1.8	7.65
12	"Devil Never Even Lived"	January 18, 2017	0.9/3	4.73	0.8	2.44	1.7	7.17
13	"Name Not One Man"	February 8, 2017	1.0/4	4.64	—N/a	2.69	—N/a	7.33
14	"Borrow or Rob"	February 15, 2017	0.8/3	4.07	0.8	2.61	1.7	6.71
15	"Draw O Caesar, Erase a Coward"	February 22, 2017	0.8/3	4.13	0.8	2.47	1.6	6.60
16	"Evil Did I Dwell, Lewd I Did Live"	March 22, 2017	0.9/3	4.26	0.6	2.15	1.5	6.41
17	"Solos"	March 29, 2017	0.9/3	4.32	0.6	2.06	1.5	6.32
18	"Senile Lines"	April 5, 2017	0.9/3	4.34	—N/a	—N/a	—N/a	—N/a
19	"Regard A Mere Mad Rager"	April 26, 2017	0.9/3	4.33	—N/a	—N/a	—N/a	—N/a
20	"In Words, Drown I"	May 3, 2017	0.9/3	4.18	0.6	—N/a	1.5	—N/a
21	"Mom"	May 10, 2017	0.8/3	3.92	0.6	2.02	1.4	5.94
22	"Lepers Repel"	May 17, 2017	0.9/3	4.28	—N/a	—N/a	—N/a	—N/a

=== Season 3 ===
Viewership and ratings per episode of List of Blindspot episodes
No.	Title	Air date	Rating/share (18–49)	Viewers (millions)	DVR (18–49)	DVR viewers (millions)	Total (18–49)	Total viewers (millions)
1	"Back to the Grind"	October 27, 2017	0.7/3	4.13	0.6	2.22	1.3	6.35
2	"Enemy Bag of Tricks"	November 3, 2017	0.7/3	3.50	0.6	2.09	1.3	5.59
3	"Upside Down Craft"	November 10, 2017	0.7/3	3.38	0.6	2.18	1.3	5.56
4	"Gunplay Ricochet"	November 17, 2017	0.6/3	3.37	0.6	2.16	1.2	5.52
5	"This Profound Legacy"	December 1, 2017	0.7/3	3.35	0.6	2.21	1.3	5.56
6	"Adoring Suspect"	December 8, 2017	0.7/3	3.50	0.6	2.23	1.3	5.73
7	"Fix My Present Havoc"	December 15, 2017	0.7/3	3.33	—N/a	—N/a	—N/a	—N/a
8	"City Folks Under Wraps"	December 22, 2017	0.6/3	3.50	—N/a	—N/a	—N/a	—N/a
9	"Hot Burning Flames"	January 12, 2018	0.7/3	3.56	0.7	2.34	1.4	5.90
10	"Balance of Might"	January 19, 2018	0.7/3	3.55	0.6	2.24	1.3	5.79
11	"Technology Wizards"	January 26, 2018	0.6/3	3.75	0.7	2.17	1.3	5.92
12	"Two Legendary Chums"	February 2, 2018	0.6/3	3.20	0.7	2.18	1.3	5.38
13	"Warning Shot"	March 2, 2018	0.7/3	3.12	0.6	2.11	1.3	5.23
14	"Everlasting"	March 9, 2018	0.6/3	3.03	0.6	1.99	1.2	5.00
15	"Deductions"	March 16, 2018	0.6/3	3.40	0.6	2.07	1.2	5.48
16	"Artful Dodge"	March 23, 2018	0.6/3	3.27	0.5	1.99	1.1	5.26
17	"Mum's the Word"	March 30, 2018	0.6/3	2.93	0.5	1.93	1.1	4.86
18	"Clamorous Night"	April 20, 2018	0.5/3	2.72	0.6	1.92	1.0	4.64
19	"Galaxy of Minds"	April 27, 2018	0.5/2	2.69	0.5	1.89	1.0	4.57
20	"Let It Go"	May 4, 2018	0.5/3	2.75	—N/a	—N/a	—N/a	—N/a
21	"Defection"	May 11, 2018	0.5/3	2.76	0.5	1.73	1.0	4.49
22	"In Memory"	May 18, 2018	0.5/3	2.98	0.5	1.61	1.0	4.59

=== Season 4 ===
Viewership and ratings per episode of List of Blindspot episodes
No.	Title	Air date	Rating/share (18–49)	Viewers (millions)	DVR (18–49)	DVR viewers (millions)	Total (18–49)	Total viewers (millions)
1	"Hella Duplicitous"	October 12, 2018	0.5/2	2.95	0.5	1.80	1.0	4.75
2	"My Art Project"	October 19, 2018	0.4/2	2.52	0.4	1.47	0.8	3.99
3	"The Quantico Affair"	October 26, 2018	0.4/2	2.50	0.4	1.50	0.8	3.99
4	"Sous-Vide"	November 2, 2018	0.4/2	2.43	0.3	1.38	0.7	3.81
5	"Naughty Monkey Kicks at Tree"	November 9, 2018	0.5/2	2.69	0.3	1.38	0.8	4.07
6	"Ca-Ca-Candidate for Cri-Cri-Crime"	November 16, 2018	0.4/2	2.54	0.4	1.50	0.8	4.04
7	"Case: Sun, Moon and the Truth"	November 30, 2018	0.5/2	2.65	0.3	1.58	0.8	4.23
8	"Screech, Thwack, Pow"	December 7, 2018	0.5/2	2.81	0.3	1.51	0.8	4.32
9	"Check Your Ed"	January 11, 2019	0.6/3	3.03	0.4	1.53	1.0	4.55
10	"The Big Reveal"	January 18, 2019	0.6/3	3.05	0.4	1.66	1.0	4.71
11	"Careless Whisper"	February 1, 2019	0.5/3	2.85	0.5	1.86	1.0	4.71
12	"The Tale of the Book of Secrets"	February 8, 2019	0.6/3	3.51	0.4	1.50	1.0	5.01
13	"Though This Be Madness, Yet There Is Method In't"	February 15, 2019	0.5/3	2.90	0.4	1.43	0.9	4.34
14	"The Big Blast From the Past Episode"	March 8, 2019	0.5/3	3.16	0.4	1.62	0.9	4.78
15	"Frequently Recurring Struggle For Existence"	March 15, 2019	0.5/3	2.62	0.3	1.53	0.8	4.16
16	"The One Where Jane Visits An Old Friend"	March 22, 2019	0.4/2	2.96	0.4	1.36	0.8	4.32
17	"The Night of the Dying Breath"	April 5, 2019	0.4/2	2.89	0.3	1.33	0.7	4.23
18	"'Ohana"	April 12, 2019	0.4/2	2.86	0.4	1.38	0.8	4.25
19	"Everybody Hates Kathy"	April 19, 2019	0.4/2	2.97	0.3	1.13	0.7	4.10
20	"Coder to Killer"	May 24, 2019	0.4/3	2.81	0.3	1.42	0.7	4.28
21	"Masters of War 1:5 – 8"	May 31, 2019	0.4/3	2.49	0.3	1.34	0.7	3.78
22	"The Gang Gets Gone"	May 31, 2019	0.3/2	2.05	0.4	1.45	0.7	3.45

=== Season 5 ===
Viewership and ratings per episode of List of Blindspot episodes
No.	Title	Air date	Rating/share (18–49)	Viewers (millions)	DVR (18–49)	DVR viewers (millions)	Total (18–49)	Total viewers (millions)
1	"I Came to Sleigh"	May 7, 2020	0.3/1	2.14	0.2	1.20	0.5	3.34
2	"We Didn't Start The Fire"	May 14, 2020	0.3/1	1.87	0.2	1.09	0.5	2.96
3	"Existential Ennui"	May 28, 2020	0.3/1	1.81	0.2	1.15	0.5	2.96
4	"And My Axe!"	June 4, 2020	0.3/1	1.98	0.2	1.15	0.5	3.11
5	"Head Games"	June 11, 2020	0.2/1	1.83	0.2	0.99	0.4	2.81
6	"Fire & Brimstone"	June 18, 2020	0.3/2	1.82	0.2	1.10	0.5	2.92
7	"Awl In"	June 25, 2020	0.3/2	1.86	0.2	0.82	0.5	2.69
8	"Ghost Train"	July 2, 2020	0.3/2	1.86	0.2	0.79	0.4	2.65
9	"Brass Tacks"	July 9, 2020	0.3/2	2.37	0.1	0.78	0.5	3.14
10	"Love You to Bits and Bytes"	July 9, 2020	0.2/1	1.78	0.1	0.81	0.4	2.59
11	"Iunne Ennui"	July 23, 2020	0.3	1.70	0.2	1.04	0.4	2.74
