= Blindspot (TV series) =

2015 American crime drama television series

- Intertitle from the first two seasons
- Genre: Action thriller; Crime drama; Mystery; Police procedural; Serial drama
- Created by: Martin Gero
- Starring: Sullivan Stapleton; Jaimie Alexander; Rob Brown; Audrey Esparza; Ashley Johnson; Ukweli Roach; Marianne Jean-Baptiste; Luke Mitchell; Michelle Hurd; Archie Panjabi; Ennis Esmer; Mary Elizabeth Mastrantonio
- Composers: Blake Neely; Sherri Chung (season 3)
- Country of origin: United States
- Original language: English
- No. of seasons: 5
- No. of episodes: 100 (list of episodes)

Production
- Executive producers: Sarah Schechter; Martin Gero; Mark Pellington (seasons 1–2); Greg Berlanti; Marcos Siega (seasons 1–2)
- Producers: Howard Griffith (seasons 1–2); Harvey Waldman (seasons 1–2); Ryan Lindenberg (season 3); Ryan Johnson (season 3); Peter Lalayanis (season 3); Chad McQuay (season 3)
- Production locations: New York City, New York
- Cinematography: Martin Ahlgren; David Johnson
- Editors: Finnian Murray; Kristin Windell (season 3)
- Camera setup: Single-camera
- Running time: 42–43 minutes
- Production companies: Berlanti Productions; Quinn's House; Warner Bros. Television

Original release
- Network: NBC
- Release: September 21, 2015 – July 23, 2020

Blindspot is an American crime drama television series created by Martin Gero for NBC and executive-produced by Gero and Greg Berlanti. The show stars Sullivan Stapleton and Jaimie Alexander, and follows a mysterious woman with no recollection of her past or identity whose numerous tattoos contain clues to crimes that a team of FBI agents must solve. Rob Brown, Audrey Esparza, Ashley Johnson, Ukweli Roach and Marianne Jean-Baptiste co-star alongside Stapleton and Alexander. Archie Panjabi, Luke Mitchell, Michelle Hurd, Ennis Esmer and Mary Elizabeth Mastrantonio joined in later seasons.

Blindspot was produced by Berlanti Productions, Quinn's House, and Warner Bros. Television, and premiered on NBC on September 21, 2015. On May 10, 2019, NBC renewed the series for a fifth and final season, which aired from May 7 to July 23, 2020.

== Premise ==
Blindspot focuses on a mysterious tattooed woman who is found naked inside a travel bag in Times Square in New York City by the Federal Bureau of Investigation (FBI). She has no recollection of her past or identity. They discover that her tattoos contain clues to crimes they must solve.

== Episodes ==
Season	Episodes	Originally released	
Season	Episodes	First released	Last released
1	23	September 21, 2015	May 23, 2016
2	22	September 14, 2016	May 17, 2017
3	22	October 27, 2017	May 18, 2018
4	22	October 12, 2018	May 31, 2019
5	11	May 7, 2020	July 23, 2020

== Cast and characters ==
=== Main ===
- Sullivan Stapleton as Kurt Weller, an FBI special agent at the New York field office. In season 1, as head of the FBI Critical Incident Response Group, he is called into the investigation of Jane when his name is found mysteriously tattooed on Jane's body. He comes to recognize Jane as his missing childhood friend, Taylor Shaw, and becomes very protective. He has never recovered from the pain and guilt he suffered because of her disappearance. In the season 1 finale, he is promoted to head of the FBI's New York branch after Mayfair's disappearance. This is the goal of Stage One of the conspiracy behind Jane's tattoos: The tattoo investigations eliminated less ethical potential candidates; Weller also learns that Jane is not Taylor Shaw and that the real Taylor has been dead for years. He is so upset about being deceived that he arrests Jane and turns her over to the CIA. The two slowly rebuild their relationship from scratch in season 2, following her escape. At the start of season 3, he and Jane marry and move to Colorado to stay close to Weller's daughter, Bethany, but an attempted hit organized by Roman, Jane's brother, forces them back into the fight. Jane disappears for two years, and when they reunite and discover new tattoos on Jane's body, the two return to New York, where they rejoin their old team and try to track Roman down. In season 4, he discovers that the effects of ZIP (the drug that first wiped Jane's memories) have caused her to revert to her pre-ZIP persona, Remi, and are slowly poisoning her. These problems are resolved by successful treatments. In the end, after the team is dismissed from the FBI, he and Jane expand their family by taking in several foster children.
- Jaimie Alexander as Remi "Jane Doe" Briggs (born Alice Kruger), an unidentified woman found naked and amnesiac in Times Square, who is kept in FBI protective custody during the investigation into her identity. Despite lacking conscious memories, Jane occasionally has flashbacks to her past life and retains a wide variety of combat and language skills. They suspect that she is a former Navy SEAL, whose identity is classified because of her involvement in special operations. On the basis of a familiar scar on the back of her neck and a DNA test, Jane is identified as Taylor Shaw, Weller's neighbor and childhood friend, who vanished 25 years ago and was presumed dead. The fate of the real Taylor Shaw is revealed when Weller's father confesses to her murder on his deathbed. Weller finds Taylor's remains at an old campsite they used as children: The conspiracy that changed the records of the Taylor Shaw case altered the DNA test results. Born Alice Kruger, in South Africa, the orphaned Jane was trained as a child soldier by the apartheid regime. Shepherd, a U.S. Army major general, eventually adopted her and raised her as a daughter. At the start of season 3, she marries Weller and the two move to Colorado to stay close to Weller's daughter Bethany. An attempted hit organized by Jane's brother Roman forces them back into the fight: Jane disappears for two years. They reunite and, discovering new tattoos on Jane's body, they return to New York, where they join their old team and track Roman down. During this time, Jane reconnects with her biological daughter Avery, whom Shepherd had forced her to give up for adoption when Jane was a teenager. Jane discovers her ties to the conspiracy that Roman is trying to bring down. At the end of the season, she reverts to her previous persona as Remi—a side effect from ZIP, the drug that originally wiped her memories. During the first half of season 4, Jane, as Remi, secretly works against her team in a bid to free Shepherd and rebuild her terrorist organization named Sandstorm. She is soon found out, and after a successful experimental treatment, Jane finally puts her past behind her, makes peace with Remi, regains all of her memories, and kills Shepherd. During the second half of the season, Jane is forced to deal with the physical effects of ZIP poisoning. The team finds a cure, in time. In the final episodes, she is ZIPed again by a bomb planted by Ivy Sands. She suffers many hallucinations as she tries to locate Ivy and the last bomb. In the end, she either dies from the poisoning or is cured and goes on to foster many children with Weller.
- Rob Brown as Edgar Reade, an FBI special agent and member of Weller's team. He has doubts about including Jane on the team and is skeptical of Weller's willingness to follow the information from Jane's tattoos so quickly. He is in love with Weller's sister, Sarah, but broke up with her both at Weller's behest and because Reade feared for Sarah's safety after one of the group behind Jane's tattoos threatened Sarah. In season 3, he becomes the head of the New York field office after Jane and Weller leave New York. He is engaged to Megan Butani, an investigative journalist, but they break up. He also has romantic feelings for his FBI partner Tasha Zapata, and he finally acts on them, late in season 4. His happiness is short-lived: He is killed in a drone strike at the end of season 4. This is not revealed until the season 5 premiere. In season 5, he appears in flashbacks and in the series finale as a hallucination caused by Jane's ZIP poisoning. Tasha gives birth to his child, as is revealed in the last scenes.
- Audrey Esparza as Natasha "Tasha" Zapata, an FBI special agent and member of Weller's team, previously an NYPD officer at the 96th Precinct for five years. She has a secret gambling addiction, caused by guilt from the death of her NYPD partner, and is deep in debt, a fact she also hides from her co-workers. She has feelings for Reade. In season 3, she leaves the FBI and joins the CIA. At the end of the season, she is supposedly terminated by the CIA, and goes to work for Blake Crawford as a fixer. After Blake's death in season 4, she works for her successor, Madeline Burke. Midway through the season, it is discovered that she had been working deep cover for the CIA all along, under Director Jake Keaton. In season 5, she hooks up with Reade shortly before his death in the drone strike at the beginning of the season, becomes pregnant, and raises their child as a single mother. After the team's dismissal from the FBI in the series finale, she works as a private investigator.
- Ashley Johnson as Patterson, an FBI special agent and head of the FBI Forensic Science Unit, responsible for studying and identifying Jane's tattoos. In season 3, she leaves the FBI to work in the tech industry. After the two-year time-skip, she returns to help solve Jane's new tattoos. Later in the season, it is revealed that Patterson is the daughter of Bill Nye (who guest-starred as himself). She took her mother's last name. In the series finale, after the team's dismissal from the FBI, she and Rich Dotcom become treasure hunters.
- Ukweli Roach as Robert Borden (seasons 1–2; recurring season 3; guest seasons 4–5), an FBI psychiatrist who helps Jane to retrieve and understand her memories. He is later revealed to be Nigel Thornton, a former doctor and a Sandstorm mole within the FBI. After the FBI corners him, he had apparently killed himself to avoid capture. However, Borden managed to fake his own death, and was found and recruited by the CIA. He goes to prison after Zapata reneges on his deal with the CIA, as justice for betraying Patterson. In season 4, Jane visits him, and he helps her to accept the lives and personas of Remi and Alice as part of her self. He later appears as a hallucination caused by Jane's ZIP poisoning in the series finale.
- Marianne Jean-Baptiste as Bethany Mayfair (season 1; guest season 2), assistant director in charge of the FBI's New York Field Office. Mayfair is directly in charge of Weller and his team; she acts as their ally and mentor. She was once the FBI contact for Operation: Daylight, a program to present illegally obtained information as coming from reliable informants. Jane's tattoos may have some connection to Daylight. After Mayfair is framed for murder because of evidence planted by an unwitting Jane, she discovers Jane at a safe house used by the conspiracy. Oscar, a member of Sandstorm, shoots and kills her. Despite her death and the damage to her reputation caused by her wrongful arrest, the team continues to remember Mayfair fondly for the rest of the series. Weller names his daughter after her, and the team pays tribute to her and Reade before leaving the FBI offices for the last time in the series finale.
- Archie Panjabi as Nas Kamal (season 2; guests seasons 3 & 5), head of Zero Division, a secret department of the NSA. She has investigated Sandstorm for years, and forms a joint NSA-FBI task force with Weller's team and Jane to try to infiltrate the organization. In order to protect the team from federal investigation, she resigns, taking responsibility for all of the task force's failures. She spends time working freelance before she is able to use a tattoo case to acquire a powerful computer virus, trading it to the NSA in return for getting her job back. She returns in the series finale to help the team capture Ivy Sands.
- Luke Mitchell as Roman Briggs (born Ian Kruger) (seasons 2–3; recurring season 4; guest season 5), Jane's brother and a member of Sandstorm. Jane wiped his memory with ZIP (the same drug that wiped her memories) after he turned against their adoptive mother Shepherd, and he remained in FBI custody for a while. After regaining his memories, including the fact that Jane erased them, he turns against her and rejoins Shepherd during her attack on the FBI's New York Office. In season 3, he devises a complex scheme to get revenge on Jane that involves covering her with new, bio-luminescent tattoos. At the end of the season, he is fatally shot by his lover Blake Crawford, and dies in Jane's arms. In seasons 4 and 5, he appears as a hallucination, as a result of Jane's ZIP poisoning.
- Michelle Hurd as Ellen "Shepherd" Briggs (season 2; recurring seasons 3–4; guest season 5), Jane's and Roman's adoptive mother and leader of the terrorist group Sandstorm. She was a U.S. Army major general with the Defense Threat Reduction Agency, and has been manipulating Weller's life since he was a teenager. She is captured at the end of season 2 after Jane and Weller foil her plans, and is imprisoned in a CIA blacksite until Jane, reverted to her persona of Remi, frees her during season 4. She is later shot and killed by Jane after the latter finally overcomes the mental effects of ZIP, but later reappears as a hallucination as a result of Jane's ZIP poisoning in the series finale.
- Ennis Esmer as Rich Dotcom (real name Gord Enver) (seasons 4–5; recurring seasons 1–3), a former computer programmer turned Internet crime lord. Eccentric and manic, Rich often embroils Weller's team in elaborate, convoluted schemes to achieve his goals. Starting in season 3, he begins working with the FBI as part of a deal for his past crimes. In the series finale, after the team's dismissal from the FBI, he and Patterson become treasure hunters.
- Mary Elizabeth Mastrantonio as Madeline Burke (season 5; recurring season 4), a major stockholder in the Crawfords' company HCI Global, who takes over the company after fatally poisoning the heiress Blake Crawford and the other executives as part of a mysterious long-term plan. At the end of the season, her plan, Project: Helios, takes effect, causing a major blackout on the Eastern Seaboard. She frames Weller's team for the attack and corruption, chairs an oversight committee for the FBI and eventually becomes director of all federal law enforcement. All this is part of a plan to avenge her father, who was killed in an FBI raid. Throughout season 5, Madeline exercises her new power. She intends to reform the world's governments, all under her leadership, by wiping the memories of the planet's population with ZIP. She continues to hunt the team, even forming an alliance with the terror group Dabbur Zhan and using ZIP on her oldest son when the team convinces him to turn against her. Near the end of the season, she manages to capture most of the team, only to see her crimes and her associates' publicly exposed by Patterson (who faked her death to escape capture) and Zapata through a connection at the New York Post (Reade's ex-fiancé, Megan Butani). The blackmail material she held against various connections is lost, thanks to the actions of Director Matthew Weitz and analyst Afreen Iqbal. Now exonerated, the team corners her when she tries to flee the country. She commits suicide in a fail-safe manner calculated to push her final plan forward. She appears in the series finale. as a hallucination, a result of Jane's ZIP poisoning.

=== Recurring ===
- Johnny Whitworth as Markos (seasons 1 & 5), a mysterious man connected to Jane's past. He was killed by an unknown sniper – later revealed to be Oscar – in Jane's safe house. He was a member of the terrorist organization Sandstorm, but grew disenchanted with their treatment of Jane. He reappears as a hallucination caused by Jane's ZIP poisoning in the series finale.
- Jordana Spiro as Sarah Weller (seasons 1 & 5), Kurt's sister. Sarah tries to heal Weller's lingering emotional trauma from Taylor Shaw's disappearance, and to repair the broken relationship between Kurt and their terminally ill father. She was in love with Kurt's co-worker and friend, Edgar Reade, until he broke up with her to protect her and her son. She later moves to Portland, Oregon, with her son. She returns in the series finale, having dinner with the team and their family and friends.
- Logan Schuyler Smith as Sawyer (seasons 1 & 5), Sarah's son and Kurt's nephew. He moves to Portland, Oregon, with his mother shortly after her breakup with Reade, but he appears in the series finale, having dinner with the team and their family and friends.
- Michael Gaston as Thomas "Tom" Carter (seasons 1 & 5), CIA deputy director, who is connected, with Mayfair, to the clandestine Operation: Daylight. He is very interested in Jane because he is afraid that her tattoos could reveal Daylight's existence. He is killed by Oscar, while trying to interrogate Jane. He reappears as a hallucination because of Jane's ZIP poisoning in the series finale.
- Joe Dinicol as David Wagner (seasons 1, 3, & 5), Patterson's boyfriend. Patterson broke up with him after being reprimanded for sharing the tattoos with David. He is killed by a Russian agent for investigating an undercover spy ring, but reappears in Patterson's coma dream in season 3 and as a hallucination caused by Jane's ZIP poisoning in the series finale. His character was modeled after David Kwong, who works as a puzzle consultant for the show.
- Jay O. Sanders as Bill Weller (seasons 1 & 5), Kurt and Sarah's father. He was accused of kidnapping and killing Taylor Shaw because he lied about his alibi. This destroyed his life and marriage and ended his relationship with his son. He is terminally ill with lung cancer. His admission that he attempted suicide the night of Taylor's disappearance finally earns back Kurt's trust. However, he confirms on his deathbed he really did kill Taylor Shaw, although he maintains it was accidental. He reappears in season 5 as a hallucination of Weller's.
- François Arnaud as Oscar (seasons 1 & 5), a mysterious man connected to Jane's past. Partial flashbacks reveal that Oscar is Jane's ex-boyfriend. They planned to marry, but Jane broke off the engagement. Although he appears to be Jane's ally against some of the radical elements of Sandstorm, the terrorist organization that gave Jane her tattoos, he lied to her about her past identity as Taylor Shaw, and seemingly harmless tests were actually part of a complex scheme to frame Mayfair for murder and corruption. When he attempts to inject Jane with a new dose of drugs to erase her memory again, Jane tries to arrest him. She accidentally stabs him in the heart with a scythe when they fight in a burning barn. He reappears in season 5 in hallucinations, seen by Weller and Jane.
- Lou Diamond Phillips as Saúl Guerrero (seasons 1 & 5), a notorious gang leader and Number Two on the FBI Ten Most Wanted Fugitives list, he is connected to Operation: Daylight, serving as the "official" source of the information Mayfair gained from the program. He was killed on Tom Carter's orders while in prison. He later reappears as a hallucination as a result of Jane's ZIP poisoning in the series finale.
- Trieste Kelly Dunn as Allie Knight, a former FBI agent, now a U.S. Marshal and FBI WITSEC liaison. She is Kurt's ex-girlfriend; she attempts to restart their relationship. She and Kurt have a daughter, Bethany.
- John Hodgman as Jonas Fischer (seasons 1 & 5), a chief inspector in the FBI Office of Professional Responsibility who maneuvers to replace Mayfair. He is exposed as a Russian asset. Jane kills him when he tries to frame her as the mole in his place. He reappears in flashbacks and as a hallucination as a result of Jane's ZIP poisoning in the series finale.
- Ajay Naidu as Sho Akhtar (seasons 1 & 3–5), an occasional enemy and ally of the team. He is killed by Madeline's team in season 5 after giving Weller's team the blueprints to the CIA black site where Rich Dotcom is being held. He later reappears as a hallucination as a result of Jane's ZIP poisoning in the series finale.
- Josh Dean as Boston Arliss Crab, an art restorer who is Rich Dotcom's ex-boyfriend and partner in crime .
- Sarita Choudhury as Sofia Varma (seasons 1 & 5), deputy White House political director, who was connected with Mayfair to Operation: Daylight and was Mayfair's girlfriend. She was reported to have killed herself, affecting Mayfair deeply. In fact, she faked her death and went into hiding, supposedly to escape unknown pursuers. She is really part of the conspiracy behind Jane's tattoos. She participates in a Oscar's plot to frame Mayfair for murder. She reappears as a hallucination as a result of Jane's ZIP poisoning in the series finale.
- Eisa Davis as Donna Hollaran/Alexandra Harrison (season 1), a sales clerk who becomes romantically involved with Mayfair. She is stabbed to death in her hotel room as a warning to Mayfair to stay away from Carter's death. The investigation that follows implicates Mayfair as the killer–according to evidence Oscar manipulated Jane into planting in Mayfair's office–and reveals that Alexandra is a disgraced private-investigator-turned-fixer who is under federal investigation.
- Aaron Abrams as Matthew Weitz, an ambitious assistant U.S. attorney secretly investigating FBI corruption and specifically targeting Mayfair on the grounds of misconduct, with Zapata's reluctant cooperation. He later becomes a congressman, and in season 4, he is appointed to succeed Eleanor Hirst as director of the FBI, becoming the third director in the series. In season 5, after Madeline Burke takes over federal law enforcement and frames the team for corruption, terrorism, and treason, he works with analysts Briana Ross and Afreen Iqbal in a secret alliance to clear the team and take her down. After Madeline murders Briana, he is forced to scale back his efforts, but eventually, he and Afreen are able to destroy the blackmail material she holds against her connections. After the team is captured and Patterson reveals Madeline's attempt to frame him for her crimes, he flees, but he later returns with loyal agents. They and the team engage in a shootout with the Dabbur Zhan mercenaries in an attempt to retake the FBI. Despite the successful coup, Weitz is critically wounded in the crossfire and dies in the FBI headquarters. He later reappears as a hallucination as a result of Jane's ZIP poisoning in the series finale.
- Dylan Baker as Sam Pellington (seasons 1–3 & 5), the initial director of the FBI in the series. He is killed by Shepherd during Sandstorm's attack on the FBI in season 2, and reappears in Patterson's coma dream in season 3 and as a hallucination as a result of Jane's ZIP poisoning in the series finale.
- Tom Lipinski as Cade (seasons 1–3 & 5), an openly gay operative of Sandstorm. He betrays the organization in season 2 after realizing that Shepherd has become the very thing she despises and becomes Nas Kamal's informant. After cooperating with the FBI, Cade is granted immunity and disappears for several years, eventually settling down with a husband and an adopted son. He is captured by the CIA and put into a black site, but later escapes after the plane transporting him crashes. Despite his cooperation, the FBI is unable to keep him from the CIA. Upon learning this, Cade takes Zapata hostage and goads Jane into killing him, to spare himself from any more imprisonment or torture. He reappears as a hallucination due to Jane's ZIP poisoning in the series finale.
- Chad Donella as Jake Keaton (seasons 2–5), deputy director of the CIA, who succeeds Tom Carter after the latter's death. He tortured Jane for information after the FBI turned her over to the CIA. He occasionally crosses paths with Weller's team during covert missions. He becomes more sympathetic to their agenda after they help him to save his daughter. In season 3, he becomes Zapata's superior when she joins the CIA. In season 4, he is left in a coma on life support after an attack that also reveals that he was acting as Zapata's handler during an undercover assignment. That assignment involved her supposedly being fired from the CIA. He is promoted and reassigned against his will at the end of the season as part of Madeline Burke's plan to take control of the FBI. During season 5, Keaton allies with Alison Knight and Boston Arliss Crab to help the team prove their innocence, but he is forced to betray them after Madeline threatens his family. He tries to turn on Madeline when she comes to arrest Zapata, only to be shot down and killed by her men. He reappears as a hallucination as a result of Jane's ZIP poisoning in the series finale.
- Jonathan Patrick Moore as Oliver Kind (seasons 2 & 5), a water conservation specialist who befriended Jane. They briefly date during season 2 until he breaks up with her after the two become involved in a kidnapping-extortion plot linked to his father. He is unable to deal with her high-octane lifestyle. He reappears as a hallucination due to Jane's ZIP poisoning in the series finale.
- Jefferson White as Parker Lewis (seasons 2 & 5), a loyal Sandstorm operative. After Jane and Roman betray the organization and leave, he takes over as Shepherd's second-in-command until his death in a shootout with the FBI near the end of season 2. He later reappears as a hallucination as a result of Jane's ZIP poisoning in the series finale.
- Li Jun Li as Karen Sun (season 2), a psychiatrist whom Nas Kamal brought in to evaluate Roman. After Borden's exposure as a Sandstorm mole, she assumed his role as a psychiatric counselor for Weller's team, for a time.
- Mary Stuart Masterson as Eleanor Hirst (seasons 2–5), the second director of the FBI in the series and Pellington's successor. Though she at first formed a friendship with Jane, Weller, and the team and helped take down Sandstorm at the end of season 2 (and even attended Jane and Weller's wedding), she was eventually revealed to be corrupt in season 3 after killing fellow agent Stuart to cover up her connections to corrupt business magnate Hank Crawford. After an attempt to frame the team for her crimes, she was ultimately exposed and arrested. Following her arrest, she reappears on two separate occasions, being questioned by the team about her ties to the tattoos, and later as a hallucination resulting from Jane's ZIP poisoning in the series finale.
- Amy Margaret Wilson as Briana Ross (seasons 2–5), an FBI analyst who frequently works with Weller's team. She idolizes them. Near the end of season 4, she is forced to betray the team to protect her parents, when Dominic Masters, the Burke's right-hand man, blackmails her. In season 5, she is recruited by Director Matthew Weitz and fellow analyst Afreen Iqbal to help bring Madeline Burke down, but Madeline soon murders her in cold blood as a warning to discourage any further attempts to cross her. She later reappears as a hallucination caused by Jane's ZIP poisoning in the series finale.
- Ami Sheth as Afreen Iqbal (seasons 3–5), an FBI analyst who frequently works with Weller's team. In season 5, after Madeline Burke frames the team and takes over the FBI, she works with Director Matthew Weitz and fellow analyst Briana Ross in a secret alliance against Madeline. The alliance falters for a while after Madeline murders Briana, but the two are eventually able to find and erase all of Madeline's blackmail material, which later proves useful when her crimes are finally exposed to the public.
- Heather Burns as Kathy Gustafson (seasons 3–5), a hacker who previously worked with Patterson and Rich during the time between seasons 2 and 3 as the trio known as the "Three Blind Mice". At first, she tries to force the trio back together to avenge her brother, but she fails and is imprisoned. In season 4, she is paroled, and soon gets engaged to Madeline Burke's right-hand man, Dominic Masters, who uses her to execute Project: Helios. She later returns in the penultimate episode of the series and helps the team stop Madeline and Dabbur Zhan's master plan. She appears as a hallucination due to Jane's ZIP poisoning in the series finale.
- Jordan Johnson-Hinds as Stuart (seasons 3–5), a young, tech-savvy agent who replaces Patterson after she leaves the FBI between seasons 2 and 3. He remains with the team following her return in season 3, but he is soon murdered by Director Eleanor Hirst after he unwittingly unearths a connection between her and one of Jane's new tattoos. He reappears in flashbacks in season 4 and as a hallucination as a result of Jane's ZIP poisoning in the series finale.
- Tori Anderson as Blake Crawford (seasons 3–5), a wealthy socialite, daughter of Hank Crawford, whom Roman befriends and with whom he becomes romantically involved. At the end of season 3, she fatally shoots Roman after learning his true identity from Zapata and inherits her father's company HCI Global after his death. However, at the start of season 4, she is fatally poisoned by Madeline Burke, one of the company shareholders, along with the rest of the company's board. She later reappears as a hallucination as a result of Jane's ZIP poisoning in the series finale, where she and Roman are married.
- Kristina Reyes as Avery Drabkin (seasons 3 & 5), Jane's daughter, the result of a teenage pregnancy, who was taken from her by Shepherd in order to keep Remi focused on Sandstorm and their mission. After assisting the team in taking down Crawford – who was responsible for the death of her adopted father – she leaves for Brown University between seasons 3 and 4. She returns in the series finale, having dinner with her mother and many family and friends.
- David Morse as Hank Crawford (seasons 3 & 5), Blake Crawford's father, a powerful businessman and CEO of HCI Global, head of a criminal conspiracy. He plans to take control of various significant military resources so that he can set himself up as a new dictator. Jane kills him at the end of season 3. He reappears as a hallucination as a result of Jane's ZIP poisoning in the series finale.
- Bill Nye as a fictional version of himself (seasons 3–5) who is Patterson's father.
- Reshma Shetty as Megan Butani (seasons 3 & 5), an investigative journalist and Reade's fiancée. She has lived in the U.S. all her life, but she is technically an illegal immigrant because her parents entered the country illegally when she was an infant. When Reade learns of her situation, he attempts to use his connections to facilitate her becoming a citizen, but they eventually break up near the end of season 3 She concludes that he has unresolved issues regarding his old feelings for Zapata. She also decides to publish her true story so that it will come out on her own terms. She returns in season 5 and, thanks to Patterson and Zapata, she publishes a story filled with evidence that exposes Madeline Burke's numerous crimes to the public.
- Chaske Spencer as Dominic Masters (seasons 4–5), Madeline Burke's right-hand man after she takes over HCI Global. He is killed at the end of season 4 by Jane and Weller, just after he puts Madeline's plan, Project: Helios, into effect. He reappears as a hallucination as a result of Jane's ZIP poisoning in the series finale.
- Britne Oldford as Claudia Murphy (seasons 4–5), a deep-cover MI6 agent sent undercover to dismantle HCI Global. After meeting and teaming up with Zapata, she fakes her death with Zapata's help to enable her to return to England. She later comes back to New York to meet up with Zapata and give more information, but she is murdered by Madeline Burke's henchmen before the meeting can take place. She reappears as a hallucination as a result of Jane's ZIP poisoning in the series finale.
- Raoul Bhaneja as Richard Shirley (seasons 4–5), Madeline Burke's lawyer, who is complicit in her schemes. In late season 5, after Madeline's crimes are exposed and the blackmail material against their connections is lost, he attempts to go to the Dabbur Zhan for help. He is quickly betrayed and killed by Ivy Sands, a member of the terrorist group. He reappears as a hallucination as a result of Jane's ZIP poisoning in the series finale.
- David Clayton Rogers as Ice Cream (seasons 4–5), an Icelandic fixer to whom the team turns when they need to hide after being framed as terrorists by Madeline Burke. After the team goes into hiding following the drone strike, he tracks them down and forces them to carry out a heist and pay off their debt. He threatens to sell them out to Madeline. He reappears as a hallucination as a result of Jane's ZIP poisoning in the series finale.
- Julee Cerda as Ivy Sands (season 5), a member of the Dabbur Zhan terrorist group and the leader of a team of mercenaries that Madeline hires to track down Weller's team in season 5. Following Madeline's death, Ivy continues to pursue their plan: to detonate ZIP bombs in major cities worldwide. When that fails, she tries to detonate one in Times Square but is foiled and arrested, becoming the last arrest the team makes before they are dismissed from the FBI.
- Tracie Thoms as Arla Grigoryan (season 5), interim director of the FBI. Following the deaths of Matthew Weitz and Madeline Burke and the collapse of the latter's new power structure, she is appointed to succeed Madeline, becoming the fourth & final director of the FBI in the series. She allows Weller's team to take the lead on capturing Ivy Sands and stopping her plans. She manages to get them immunity deals for the crimes for which they were framed, but on condition that they not return to the FBI or work for any other government agency.

== Production ==
=== Development ===
On January 23, 2015, a pilot was ordered by NBC. The pilot was written by Martin Gero, who was also set to serve as executive producer alongside Greg Berlanti. On February 12, 2015, it was reported that Mark Pellington would direct the pilot episode.

On May 1, 2015, NBC gave the production a series order. It was also reported that Berlanti Productions, Quinn's House and Warner Bros. Television would serve as production companies. A few days later, it was announced that the series would premiere in the fourth quarter of 2015. On July 11, 2015, the premiere date was set for September 21, 2015. A back nine order was given on October 9, 2015, bringing the first season to a total of 22 episodes, along with an order for an additional episode, bringing the first-season episode count to 23. On November 9, 2015, it was announced that the series had been renewed for a second season. The second season premiered on September 14, 2016. On May 10, 2017, the show was renewed for a third season, which premiered on October 27, 2017. On May 10, 2018, NBC renewed the series for a fourth season that premiered on October 12, 2018. On May 10, 2019, NBC renewed the series for a fifth and final season of 11 episodes. The season was set to air in mid-2020, but due to the airing of Parks and Recreation's special A Parks and Recreation Special, it instead premiered on May 7, 2020.

=== Casting ===
In February 2015, it was announced that Jaimie Alexander, Sullivan Stapleton, Rob Brown, Audrey Esparza and Ukweli Roach had been cast in lead roles. Later in 2015, it was reported that Ashley Johnson and Michael Gaston had joined the main cast. On June 22, 2016, Archie Panjabi joined the cast and the next day, both Luke Mitchell and Michelle Hurd joined as series regulars for the second season. In mid-2018, Ennis Esmer, who had recurred during the first three seasons, was upgraded to series regular for the fourth. In the fifth season, Mary Elizabeth Mastrantonio, after recurring in the previous season, was upgraded to series regular.

=== Filming Locations ===
Blindspot was primarily filmed in New York City, making extensive use of recognizable landmarks and cityscapes to ground the series in an urban setting. Interior scenes were largely shot on soundstages, while exterior sequences frequently featured locations in Manhattan and Brooklyn.

Beyond New York, production also incorporated international locations to support the show’s global storylines. Filming for season 3 took place in Hungary, South Africa, Spain, Thailand, Italy, and Australia. A notable example is the fourth-season episode "The Tale of the Book of Secrets", which included scenes shot at Machu Picchu, Peru.

== Broadcast ==
In Australia, the series was acquired by the Seven Network and premiered on October 28, 2015. In Canada, CTV acquired the broadcasting rights for the series. Netflix acquired the streaming rights to Blindspot in Canada in June 2021 and Australia on September 1, 2021. In the United Kingdom, it premiered on Sky Living on November 24, 2015.

== Reception ==
=== Ratings ===
Viewership and ratings per season of Blindspot
Season	Timeslot (ET)	Episodes	First aired		Last aired		TV season	Viewership rank	Avg. viewers (millions)
Season	Timeslot (ET)	Episodes	Date	Viewers (millions)	Date	Viewers (millions)	TV season	Viewership rank	Avg. viewers (millions)
1	Monday 10:00 pm	23	September 21, 2015	10.61	May 23, 2016	5.85	2015–16	28	10.80
2	Wednesday 8:00 pm	22	September 14, 2016	7.10	May 17, 2017	4.28	2016–17	51	7.15
3	Friday 8:00 pm	22	October 27, 2017	4.13	May 18, 2018	2.98	2017–18	95	5.16
4	Friday 8:00 pm	22	October 12, 2018	2.95	May 31, 2019	2.05	2018–19	105	4.34
5	Thursday 9:00 pm	11	May 7, 2020	2.14	July 23, 2020	1.70	2019–20	N/A	N/A

=== Critical response ===
Blindspot has received generally positive reviews from critics. On Rotten Tomatoes the first season has a rating of 68%, based on 113 reviews, with an average rating of 6.3/10. The site's critical consensus reads, "Blindspot is elevated by an intriguing mystery and enough strong action to propel most viewers into a necessary suspension of disbelief." On Metacritic, the series has a score of 65 out of 100, based on 32 critics, indicating "generally favorable reviews".

== Home video ==
The first season of Blindspot was released on DVD and Blu-ray on August 2, 2016, in Region 1. It contains all 23 episodes, as well as additional materials. The second season was released on DVD and Blu-ray on August 8, 2017. The third season was released on DVD, while the Warner Archive Collection released a manufacture-on-demand Blu-ray version. Warner Archive Collection released the fourth season on DVD and Blu-ray as manufacture-on-demand titles on November 26, 2019.

Title	Ep #	Discs	Region 1/A	Region 2/B	Region 4/B	Special features
Blindspot: The Complete First Season	23	5	August 2, 2016	N/A	August 31, 2016	Behind the scenes featurettes; Tattooed clues; 19 deleted scenes; The 2015 Comic-Con panel; Bound and gag reel; "Pilot" audio commentary
Blindspot: The Complete Second Season	22	5	August 8, 2017	N/A	August 23, 2017	Featurettes; Deleted scenes
Blindspot: The Complete Third Season	22	4	August 21, 2018	N/A	August 20, 2018	Deleted scenes; Gag reel; Agent Zapata featurette
Blindspot: The Complete Fourth Season	22	4	November 26, 2019	N/A	November 27, 2019 (Note: No Blu-Ray Release)	None
Blindspot: The Complete Fifth and Final Season	11	3	November 17, 2020	N/A	November 18, 2020	None
