= List of dystopian TV programs =

== Series ==
- 3%, 2016–2020. A Brazilian, dystopian thriller series created by Pedro Aguilera. The series is set in a future wherein people are given a chance to go to the "better side" of a world divided between progress and affluence in the Offshore, and devastation and poverty in the Inland, but only 3% of the candidates succeed.
- Aeon Flux, 1991–1995. Created by Peter Chung, this was a graphic cartoon television series seen on MTV and also the name of a movie produced in 2005 that foretells of an unknown period of Earth's future human society under the control of a man named Trevor Goodchild. His world, brought under the glaring microscope of the series' heroine, Aeon Flux, is a militaristic scientific socialist paradise, partially of his own making, although it functions as a dystopia. One episode from the short-lived series was entitled "Utopia or Dystopia?".
- Almost Human, 2013–2014. Created by J. H. Wyman, this series featured the partnership between human and android police officers in a future where technology had advanced human life, but also future stratified society. The series follows the local police department solve crimes, and deals with the discussion of humanity with an emerging artificial intelligence debate.
- Amerika, 1987. Created by Donald Wrye, this was an ABC miniseries about life in the United States after a bloodless takeover engineered by the Soviet Union.
- An Englishman's Castle, 1978
- Avatar: The Last Airbender, 2005–2008. In the second season, focuses on the Earth Kingdom (one of the four nations of the fictional world). Its capital city, Ba Sing Se, has a very strict class system. Also, even though there is an ongoing war that has lasted for one hundred years, nobody in the city is supposed to talk about the war. If they do, they are captured by special forces known as the Dai Li and are hypnotized until they believe that there is no war. When the heroes of the show meet Long Feng, the true ruler of Ba-Sing-Se (the king is just a figurehead), he claims that Ba-Sing-Se is the last utopia in the world.
- Avenger (2003). Anime about a world where humanity is crushed under the heel of alien oppression until the Age of Light (perhaps a nuclear or antimatter weapons deployment?) reverses fortunes.
- Black Mirror, 2011–present. Created by Charlie Brooker, this anthology series shows the dark side of life and technology.
- Blake's 7, BBC, 1978–1981. An Orwellian space opera created by Terry Nation.
- Buck Rogers in the 25th Century 1979–1981. Captain William Anthony "Buck" Rogers, a NASA astronaut who commands Ranger 3, a space shuttle that is launched in May 1987. Due to a life support malfunction, Buck is frozen by chance for 504 years before the derelict spacecraft is discovered drifting in space in the year 2491. He learns that civilization on Earth was rebuilt following a devastating nuclear war that occurred on November 22, 1987, and is now under the protection of the Earth Defense Directorate.
- Charlie Jade, South Africa, 2004. A private investigator from an alternate universe controlled by a global corporate state discovers that the corporation, Vexcor, has opened a link to two alternate universes to exploit their resources, being trapped as a fish out of water in our own universe in the process.
- Cleverman, Australia, 2016–present. A near future Australian city where people called "Hairies" attempt to live and co-exist in an ever increasing authoritarian police state.
- Cold Lazarus, BBC, Channel 4 1996. A miniseries set in dystopian England.
- Colony, USA Network, 2016
- Continuum 2012-2015. In the year 2077, the Corporate Congress has taken on the role of government after they bailed out the North American government. After a huge economic collapse, civil liberties were taken away to ensure a better future for the next generation.
- Dark Angel, Fox, 2000–2002. A dystopian world set in Seattle after terrorists have set off an electromagnetic bomb which caused all electronic devices to stop working, disrupting life as we know it. A militaristic police force guards the "zones" which separate rich and poor.
- Dark Matter, 2015–2017. Created by Joseph Mallozzi and Paul Mullie, based on their comic book of the same name and developed by Prodigy Pictures in association with Space channel. An order for 13 episodes was placed for the first season of the series, which premiered on June 12, 2015 on both Space and Syfy.
- Daily Mail Island, UKTV. Two comedy sketches derived from the cult website TVGoHome that portray a reality television show (a parody of Castaways) where people are stranded on a remote island with only the Daily Mail, a right wing tabloid newspaper, as a source of information. It takes on a dystopian tone with a teenage girl executed for masturbating. The TVGoHome website credits a Dee Stopian as the producer.
- Dark Justice, Playboy TV, 2000–2001. A sexually themed computer-animated sci-fi parody taking place in a dystopian future.
- Doctor Who, BBC, 1963–1989, 2005–present. In some stories, the technical, social or political forces that bind a dystopia on a planet are a central theme – and sometimes is a parody of contemporary situations.
  - The Daleks – On Skaro, the inherent pacifism of the Thals leads to their domination.
  - Inferno – The Doctor arrives on a parallel Earth ruled by a fascist regime.
  - Genesis of the Daleks – The Doctor witnesses the creation of the Daleks on the planet Skaro by a scientific and militaristic regime.
  - The Sun Makers – On Pluto, in the future humans are exploited by an oppressive tax system.
  - Vengeance on Varos – On Varos, a plebiscite system kills any Governor proposing necessary but unpopular policies.
  - The Happiness Patrol – On Terra Alpha, sadness is punishable by death.
  - "The Long Game" – On Earth, the news is falsified to keep humanity frightened, ignorant and enslaved.
  - "Rise of the Cybermen" – After the TARDIS malfunctions, Rose, Mickey, and the tenth Doctor are thrown into a parallel universe with a strict class system, censored media, and a complete monopoly over everything by a single organization. Citizens are also forcefully upgraded into Cybermen.
  - "Turn Left" – Donna sees an image of what if she never met the Doctor as the Hospital only has one survivor, the Titanic crashes on Buckingham Palace meaning London was destroyed, America's population were wiped out by Adipose Industries, Torchwood gave their lives to save the Earth from the Sontarans, and the stars are going out.
- Dollhouse, 2009–2010. Most of the series is set in the near future, where living dolls are filled with appropriate personalities and skills for the amusement and cathartic well-being of the extremely wealthy. The two yearly finales, "Epitaph One" and "Epitaph Two" are set ten years in the future in a dystopian society as the technology runs rampant.
- Electric City 2012–present. Created by Tom Hanks, the series begins after the world has ended. Electric City represents peace and security in the midst of rubble. Even though it seems to be an orderly utopia, there are still secrets, back-alley dealings, daring chases and murder.
- Falling Skies, 2011–2015. Set six months into a world devastated by an alien invasion. A former Boston University history professor Tom Mason becomes the second-in-command of the 2nd Massachusetts Militia Regiment which is a group of civilians and fighters fleeing post-apocalyptic Boston.
- Firefly, 2002-2003. In the year 2517, former members of a rebel political group butt heads with the corrupt interplanetary government known as the Alliance.
- The Fire Next Time is a 1993 American television disaster miniseries directed by Tom McLoughlin and written and produced by James S. Henerson which stars Craig T. Nelson, Bonnie Bedelia, Richard Farnsworth and Justin Whalin. Set in 2017, the plot focuses on a family who, after a series of fires begins to break out due to global warming, must struggle to survive a natural disaster that devastates the earth.
- Fringe, 2012, season 5 is set 21 years after the world was invaded by a civilisation from the future.
- From the New World Set in Japan a millennium from now, Six children have been raised in a utopian town; however we soon learn things are nowhere near as nice as they appear.
- The Good Place, 2016–2020, is set in an afterlife utopia that is later revealed to be created by a demonic entity known as The Bad Place as part of an experiment to torture humans. It has been rebooted 802 times over the course of endless years, all being failures because of the series’ protagonist Eleanor Shellstrop having guessed the actual location. In addition to the two places, there is also a neutral utopia known as The Medium Place, whose only resident is Mindy St. Claire.
- The Handmaid's Tale, based on the 1985 novel
- Invader Zim, 2001–2006. This is set in a parallel universe where technology is much more advanced. Citizens are seemingly brainwashed and completely unaware of the dangers Irken Zim brings to their planet. No one questions anything despite how poorly Zim is trying to blend in with the others.
- Island City, 1994, a made-for-TV movie (possibly a failed series pilot?) produced by Warner Bros. for its Prime Time Entertainment Network (PTEN) syndicated package. Set in a future where a youth drug caused most of humanity to devolve into a violent, caveman-like state, with the few remaining normal humans residing in the title city, a protected megalopolis.
- Jeremiah, Showtime, 2002 – 2004. The year is 2021, 15 years after a plague has killed nearly everyone over the age of puberty (both the event and the virus itself are referred to as "The Big Death" and "The Big D"). The children who survived are now grown, and find themselves faced with two choices: either continue to scavenge off the diminishing remains of the old world, or begin trying to rebuild.
- Jericho, CBS, 2006–2008. It is a dystopian series set in a fictional small town in Kansas called Jericho after a nationwide nuclear disaster plunged the entire country and the town into mass anarchy.
- The Last Man on Earth, Fox, 2015–present, is set in the year 2020, where Phil Miller is seemingly the only human left on Earth after a deadly virus swept the planet one year earlier.
- The Leftovers, HBO, 2014–2017, takes place three years after a global event in which 2% of the world's population disappeared.
- Luna, 1983–1984. British Children television sitcom where bureaucracy has gone out of control, but with elements of black comedy, and absurdist theatre.
- The Man in the High Castle, based on the 1962 novel
- Max Headroom, 1987–1988. Cyberpunk, oriented around an anti-corruption reporter and his artificial intelligence copy.
- Nowhere Man, UPN, 1995–1996. A photojournalist's identity is stolen from him. One day, his wife and friends no longer recognize him. In the process of getting his life back, he discovers that a shadowy "Organization", more powerful than the government, is responsible for what is happening to him. Dystopian themes such as the erasure of identities, subliminal mind control, genetic testing, and government conspiracies are explored in various episodes.
- Power Rangers RPM, 2009. In this season of the Power Rangers franchise, an AI computer virus named Venjix takes over all of the Earth's computers, creates an army of robot foot soldiers called "Grinders" and destroys or enslaves almost all of humanity. Only the city of Corinth remains, protected by an almost impenetrable force field from the toxic atmosphere of the wasteland outside. The RPM Power Rangers are assigned to defend Corinth. Later it is confirmed that this season of Power Rangers took place in an alternate universe different from the main PR universe of previous seasons. The season ended with a cliff hanger showing that the Venjix Virus survived the battle at Corinth, and was finally resolved in Power Rangers Beast Morphers.
- The Prisoner, 1967–1968 and 2009. A secretive ex-spy attempts to escape an idealistic yet controlled artificial town run by unknown inquisitive authorities. Most attempts to escape fail and "successful" escapes happen only when they are allowed.
- Psycho-Pass, 2012–2013. A Japanese Animated Series, set in near future where society's brain activity is constantly monitored in an effort to maintain peace. However, the struggle to maintain the status quo slowly begins to unravel when some individuals are found to be undetectable by the computer control system.
- Sliders, Fox, 1995–1997, Sci-Fi Channel 1998–2000. Team of three or four people travel ("slide," hence the title) between dimensions, to alternate Earths, where history has taken a slightly different path. Most of these alternate Earths were, in one way or another, dystopian.
- In Steins;Gate, a world led by SERN (fictional organization based on CERN) through dystopia determines John Titor to go back in time and attempt to change the future.
- Survivors, BBC, 1975–77 and 2008–2010. British post-apocalyptic television series concerning the plight of a group of people who have survived an accidentally released plague – a genetically modified form of influenza– that kills nearly the entire population of the planet.
- Samurai Jack, 2001-2004 and 2017. In this animated series, a shape-shifting force of evil named Aku sends the protagonist, a Samurai, into the future, where Aku has taken over and turned Earth into a dystopian, high-tech society full of corruption, crime and alien immigrants. Jack's main objective is to get back to his own time period and defeat Aku to prevent this disturbing future from coming to pass.
- See launched as one of the inaugural shows on Apple TV+ in 2019/ The show is set in a distant future, centuries after a virus has annihilated most of the human race and left the remaining population completely blind. Civilization has devolved into tribal societies that persecute and enslave one another, ruled by superstitious beliefs and an ignorance of the past.
- The Sonic series, where either Dr. Robotnik has taken over the planet of Mobius or is planning to.
- SS-GB, 2017 miniseries
- Squid Game, 2021-2025, where South Korea is plunged into deep poverty and loan sharks run rampant. The main character, Saeong Gi-Hun, receives an invitation to play some games and win big money, which can allow him to settle his debts. The games turn out to be the bloody iterations of children's games where elimination means death and there can only be one winner. Players are under constant surveillance of masked guards and the elaborate facility is run by a mysterious Front Man in black clothes and black mask. Gi-Hun wins the Battle Royale-esque macabre contest and vows to stop the Squid Game once and for all.
- SWAT Kats: The Radical Squadron, 1993–1994. The episode "A Bright and Shiny Future" from second season has the SWAT Kats and the Pastmaster tossed during the Enforcer assault over the bridge into the future where the Metallikats have taken over and turned Megakat City into a dystopian, post-apocalyptic concentration camp with the kats serving as slave labor and the technokats serving as the arrogant and brutal law enforcements. As it turns out, the Pastmaster planned every bad thing that happened in Megakat City along with the Metallikats only to be betrayed by them and forcing to ally himself with the SWAT Kats and the other good guys to revenge himself against the Metallikats.
- The Tribe, 1999–2003. This New Zealand series is set in a hypothetical near-future in which all adults have been wiped out by a deadly virus, leaving the children of the world to fend for themselves.
- The Tripods, BBC, 1984–1985. Humans are enslaved by an alien race via mind control devices. Culture and technology have been suppressed, and the alien masters are worshipped with a religious fervour. A small resistance movement must fight both the alien threat and the human society that serves it.
- The Twilight Zone, 1959–1964. Many episodes are set in futuristic and dystopian settings, as a warning to viewers about the dangers of certain aspects of modern society or culture.
- The 1980s V science fiction franchise, inspired by Sinclair Lewis' novel It Can't Happen Here.
- The Walking Dead, AMC, 2010–present, the United States is overrun by zombies.
- Wild Palms, a miniseries, which first aired in 1993 on the ABC Network in the United States, about the dangers of brainwashing through technology and drugs.
- The Worm that Turned, BBC, 1980, comical series within The Two Ronnies television show, in which women dominate men in England.
- In the anime Yu-Gi-Oh 5D, the entire future world is destroyed by a combination of energy reactors that are powered by negative human emotions and huge robots called Machine Emperors that were brought out of trading cards to destroy all humans to, ironically, prevent the negative energy reactor from destroying the planet. The last four humans left alive, Bruno, Paradox, Aporia, and Z-one, travel back in time to destroy the home city of the main-protagonists, New Domino City, and kill the creator of the card game the Machine Emperors originated from to prevent the apocalyptic future, but are stopped by the main protagonists after they are assured by them that they will prevent the ruinous future from happening in a less murderous and destructive way.

== Episodes ==
- Captain Planet and the Planeteers, the episode "Utopia" from the second season. Kwame and his fellow Planeteers are fighting for survival in a surreal, gang-dominated world ruled by Verminous Skumm and Dr. Blight. When Dr. Blight turns the other Planeteers into punks, Kwame's only ally is Darian, leader of Utopia, the last unpolluted refuge on the planet. Just when things look hopeless and even Captain Planet cannot prevail, Kwame awakens to find it was just a nightmare.
- Darkwing Duck, 1991–1992. In the episode "Life, the Negaverse, and Everything" the dystopian version of St.Canard called Negaverse is the home of the villainous Negaduck. Everything in this apocalyptic world is the opposite of the regular universe: crime rules the streets, villains are the good guys and Negaduck is the supreme ruler. With Darkwing's help, the Friendly Four were able to restore the city to the beauty of the regular universe St. Canard. Darkwing Duck left the Negaverse with Nega-Gosalyn in the care of the Friendly Four.
- Heroes episode "Five Years Gone", 2007. In this possible future, New York City has been destroyed and any evolved human is automatically doomed to execution.
- Misfits, (Season 3, Episode 4)
- Play of the Week episode The Other Man, 1964
- The Powerpuff Girls, 1998-2005. In the episode "Speed Demon", the girls race each other home, but due to the intense speed of the race they're having, they end up flying fifty years into the future and eventually land in an alternative version of Townsville where as a result of the Girls abandoning the towns and its population, the town itself fell under was left destroyed and damaged while in their absence, Him has managed to gain control of the entire world so much so that he is capable of surviving being beaten by the Girls several times, hits that would normally weaken or defeat Him. In response, Him transforms into his true self: a demonic form and reveals the zombie townspeople who are angry at the Girls for abandoning them, claiming that it's the Girls' fault. Unable to take anymore, the Girls eventually return to their own modern timeline and upon finding everything the same as it was when they left, rush home to greet the Professor while also vowing to stay and guard Townsville at all costs to ensure that the horrific future they saw never comes to pass.
- Star Trek: Enterprise, episodes "Zero Hour"/"Storm Front"
- Star Trek: The Original Series, episode "The City on the Edge of Forever"
- The Time Tunnel, episodes 12 ("The Death Trap") and 25 ("The Death Merchant")
- The Wild Wild West episode "The Night of the Lord of Limbo"
