= List of Dark Matter episodes =

Dark Matter is a Canadian science fiction series created by Joseph Mallozzi and Paul Mullie, based on their comic book of the same name and developed by Prodigy Pictures in association with Space channel. An order for 13 episodes was placed for the first season of the series, which premiered on June 12, 2015.

On September 1, 2017, Syfy canceled the series after three seasons. During the course of the series, 39 episodes of Dark Matter aired over three seasons.

== Series overview ==
Season	Episodes	Originally released	
Season	Episodes	First released	Last released
1	13	June 12, 2015	August 28, 2015
2	13	July 1, 2016	September 16, 2016
3	13	June 9, 2017	August 25, 2017

== Episodes ==
=== Season 1 (2015) ===
No. overall	No. in season	Title	Directed by	Written by	Original release date	Can. viewers (millions)
1	1	"Episode One"	TJ Scott	Joseph Mallozzi & Paul Mullie	June 12, 2015	0.273
Six people awaken from stasis on an unknown starship. None of them can remember who they are or what they are doing on the ship. They name themselves One through Six, based on the order in which they awoke. Searching the ship, they discover a cargo of weapons and two of them are attacked by the ship's android, whom they manage to deactivate and reset. They are then attacked by another ship, but manage to escape via hyperspace. Their last programmed destination is an independent mining colony; the miners are awaiting help and weapons to defend themselves from a powerful mega-corporation, Ferrous Corp. With One, Five and Six voting to deliver the weapons and Three and Four voting to abandon the miners to their fate, Two (who has assumed de facto leadership) decides that they will deliver half the weapons and keep the other half to sell. The Android then extracts information from the ship's corrupted data files that states that all of them with the exception of Five, a teenage girl, are wanted murderers and thieves. They conclude that they were hired by Ferrous to kill the miners and had stolen the weapon shipment from their actual saviors.
2	2	"Episode Two"	TJ Scott	Joseph Mallozzi	June 19, 2015	0.262
When negotiations between the corporation's landing party and the miners break down and a firefight breaks out, One commits the crew to the independents without consulting the others, and he, Three, Four and Six are caught up in fighting the Ferrous Corp troops on the surface. Two, who remained aboard the ship with Five and the Android, seemingly flees. She obtains the assistance of Ferrous's fiercest rival, the Mikkei Combine, and negotiates a 99-year lease to protect the miners. Five begins to have dreams that she believes are memories that belong to other crew members, while Three mulls over what is behind the locked door he has found on the Raza, their ship.
3	3	"Episode Three"	Paolo Barzman	Martin Gero	June 26, 2015	N/A
Five, with time on her hands, goes exploring, crawling through the piping and venting system, and stumbles upon the body of a murdered teenage boy about her age in a cargo hold. In one of her dreams, Five experiences the perspective of one of the crew sabotaging the ship's systems just before they enter the stasis pods, and the Android finds traces of the deleted subroutine that wiped their memories. The ship drops out of hyperdrive due to a damaged coupling in a region of space bathed in lethal radiation. With only hours before it penetrates their shield, the Android goes outside and makes repairs but needs to be rescued by Six and One. Two has the Android put everyone through a truth test to try to identify the one who tampered with the ship, but they all pass, proving that whichever of them is responsible for the mindwipe wiped their own memories as well.
4	4	"Episode Four"	Amanda Tapping	Joseph Mallozzi	July 3, 2015	N/A
The crew head to the nearest space station for repairs, refueling and supplies. With no funds for anything else, they decide to find a buyer for the weapons that they have. Two and Five go to the casino to try to grow their small stake, but have a lethal encounter with the management for winning too much, where Five is shocked by Two's ferocity. One and Three look for a buyer, but are instead captured by the real Jace Corso (One's supposed identity, who like One is played by Marc Bendavid), a true sociopath, who concludes that because One has lasted too long to be a clone, he must have had surgery to copy Corso's appearance. They manage to escape, though Corso steals the weapons on the Raza by briefly masquerading as One to the Android. Four finds out he is a wanted suspect in the death of his father, the Emperor of Zairon. Six goes to a clinic to have his burn from the previous episode treated, but is identified as a wanted fugitive, setting off station-wide security alarms. The crew flees the station.
5	5	"Episode Five"	Lee Rose	Paul Mullie	July 10, 2015	N/A
The crew are contacted by their handler and agent, Tabor Calchek (David Hewlett), who assigns them to salvage a seemingly abandoned space freighter for half their regular rate for "botching" their job to exterminate the mining colony. The crew find themselves fighting for their lives as they encounter zombie-like beings intent on killing them or infecting them with the disease that transformed the other crew into monsters, the result of an experiment into immortality that went wrong. Two is bitten but mysteriously does not become sick, and later finds that her wound has healed completely under the bandage, a fact she hides from the others.
6	6	"Episode Six"	Ron Murphy	Paul Mullie	July 17, 2015	N/A
Five proposes modifying medical equipment in an attempt to retrieve the crew's memories stored in her brain. Although she learns more about Four's past as the crown prince of Zairon and how he was framed by his stepmother the Empress, as well as discovering her own prior identity before stowing away on the Raza, an orphaned pickpocket nicknamed "Das", she becomes stuck in her dream-like state. Six volunteers to enter her visions in order to rescue her, and discovers more about his own past.
7	7	"Episode Seven"	Bruce McDonald	Robert C. Cooper	July 24, 2015	0.534
The crew manages to get into the ship's locked vault. They find valuables, a stasis pod carrying Sarah, a woman from Three's past who is dying from an incurable disease, and an entertainment android named Wendy. Wendy is programmed to perform a wide range of activities, including cooking, games and sex. As Sarah fills Three in on their romantic history together, Wendy, a Trojan horse programmed by an enemy the crew no longer remember, locks the Raza on a course into the nearest star. Wendy is defeated, but the power fluctuations caused by her actions cause Sarah's pod to lose power shortly after she returns to it and she dies.
8	8	"Episode Eight"	TW Peacocke	Trevor Finn	July 31, 2015	N/A
After they dock for repairs and supplies, Six uses Transfer Transit technology (a short-lived clone is created at the destination and given the traveler's personality and memories via a subspace transmission while the original rests in a pod; later, its new memories are transmitted back unless the clone dies before it can happen) to try to track down the General, the fugitive leader of the Procyon Insurrection, a revolt against the Galactic Authority. Six was part of the revolt, until he unwittingly took part in a mission that included blowing up the space station Hyadum-12 and killing 10,000 innocent civilians. One and Four go after Six by the same method, only to discover that One's clone body has a different face (played by Dan Jeannotte). From his DNA, One discovers that he is actually Derrick Moss, the heir of the Moss fortune, and that Marcus Boone (Three) was the chief suspect in his wife Catherine's death, explaining why One infiltrated the Raza.
9	9	"Episode Nine"	Ron Murphy	Joseph Mallozzi	August 7, 2015	N/A
Four leaves the ship to meet his younger half-brother, Hiro, who is now Emperor in his place, and to proclaim his innocence in the murder of their father. However, when he arrives at the meeting place, he is instead greeted by his former instructor and mentor, Akita, who arrests him. As Four attempts to convince Akita of his innocence, the crew eventually decide to go after him and arrive in time to save him and Akita from bandits. One contemplates taking advantage of the confusion to shoot Three during the firefight and avenge the murder of the wife he no longer remembers, but is unable to bring himself to do so, instead saving Three's life by shooting one of the bandits. Four murders Akita in cold blood as a message to his brother. Back in space, the Raza is approached by three Ferrous Corp destroyers that fire and disable its faster-than-light (FTL) drives.
10	10	"Episode Ten"	John Stead	Paul Mullie	August 14, 2015	N/A
Three Mikkei Combine ships drop out of FTL to provide much-needed support, causing the Ferrous Corp destroyers to depart. Mikkei's Commander Truffault (Torri Higginson), with whom Two negotiated on behalf of the miners in the second episode, offers the crew a job: to steal a device from Traugott Corporation's research station. Desperate to keep Mikkei as an ally, the crew reluctantly accepts the mission, despite being given very little information, and teams up with another group of mercenaries (Wexler, Tash, Vons and Cain) to pull off the theft. Once they return to the Raza with the device, however, the other mercenaries turn on the crew, and their leader Wexler ejects Two into the vacuum of space.
11	11	"Episode Eleven"	Martin Wood	Paul Mullie	August 21, 2015	N/A
The mercenaries set out to collect the substantial bounties on the remaining Raza crew. While they try to extract information about Jace Corso's secret stash from One by threatening Five, the FTL drive malfunctions again. Two kills Vons after he is sent outside the ship to make repairs and retakes the ship with help from Five, killing Tash, Cain and Wexler (by spacing him in turn) while the rest of the Raza crew are being held prisoner in the vault. Afterward, the Android reveals that Two is an illegally enhanced human being, artificially constructed to be faster and stronger and equipped with nanites that enabled her to survive in vacuum, as well as to resist the contagion in the fifth episode. The crew deliver the Traugott device to a Mikkei research outpost on Iriden-3, but soon after they leave, it activates and destroys the planet.
12	12	"Episode Twelve"	Andy Mikita	Joseph Mallozzi	August 28, 2015	0.397
Five remembers that Six saved her from being airlocked by Three when she was discovered as a stowaway before the mindwipe; the crew then voted on her fate and chose to keep her around by a slim majority (One, Four and Six vs Two and Three, with Four as the deciding vote). The Android confirms that the device that destroyed Iriden-3 was a white hole bomb, and Two reasons that Traugott allowed it to be stolen so that they could test it on one of their competitors. Tabor Calchek gives the team a job, a seemingly routine rescue of a scientist, but it is a trap. Alex Rook (Wil Wheaton), CEO of Dwarf Star Technologies, created Two and wants her back. A dampening field strips Two of her powers, and the rest of the crew is forced to leave the research facility without her. They return secretly and drop off the Android to infiltrate the facility and turn off the dampening field, before retrieving their crewmate. Back aboard the Raza, someone disables the Android. One of Five's dreams leads her to retrieve a listening device her original self planted, on which she finds a recording of Two and Four's original selves saying that an unnamed (male) member of the crew has to die before the ship reaches the mining colony from the pilot episode. Elsewhere, Rook has a conversation with a mysterious sick man who orders him to kill the crew, as they know too much about their secret activities.
13	13	"Episode Thirteen"	Andy Mikita	Joseph Mallozzi & Paul Mullie	August 28, 2015	0.397
After a thorough search of the ship finds nobody else, it becomes clear that the Android's assailant is one of them. Suspicion and distrust threaten to split the team. Five tells Six about the recording she found and he realizes that she wrote the mind-wiping code to save someone on the crew from being murdered. Four is knocked out (but seems to be otherwise unharmed), followed by Six. A standoff ensues as One and Three, acting on their usual mutual distrust, each try to convince Two that the other is the saboteur, only for Five to appear and accuse Two of being the real saboteur under the belief that Dwarf Star did something to her mind when she was recaptured recently. Then as Galactic Authority ships intercept the Raza and troops storm the ship, the four of them are all knocked out with gas. The entire crew are carried off unconscious by GA soldiers, except Six, who walks along freely.

=== Season 2 (2016) ===
The premiere episode of the season had 448,000 viewers in Canada. Beginning with this season, episodes had individual titles rather than simply numbers.

No. overall	No. in season	Title	Directed by	Written by	Original release date
14	1	"Welcome to Your New Home"	Amanda Tapping	Paul Mullie	July 1, 2016
Two, Three and Four are placed in the general population of the Hyperion-8 Maximum Security Galactic Detention Facility without a trial, unaware that Six had sold them out to the Galactic Authority (GA). One and Five are held temporarily in the staff wing of the facility, since Five is only guilty of petty theft, vandalism and truancy and One's DNA shows he is not Jace Corso. Six confesses to One and Five about really being Lieutenant Kal Varrik, an undercover GA agent tasked with bringing the Raza in (Six learned this offscreen during the events of the eighth episode), and that he decided to fulfill his original mission after Iriden-3 was destroyed due to their actions. Two and Four discovered Six's identity before the mindwipe but Five created a virus to prevent them killing him. One is soon released after Derrick Moss's lawyer contests his imprisonment. He delves further into his wife's murder and comes to believe that Three was not responsible, especially after the only witness to his crime dies soon after One asks the acting CEO of his family company to locate the man. Later, Jace Corso shows up and shoots One dead. Six learns that the GA let the terrorist attack on Hyadum-12 happen on purpose. He tries to have Five, whose real name is revealed to be Emily Kolburn, transferred to a group home, but the order is overruled by Chief Inspector Shaddick.
15	2	"Kill Them All"	Bruce McDonald	Joseph Mallozzi	July 8, 2016
The crew of the Raza plan their escape from Hyperion-8, but in the meantime the Traugott Corporation orders the warden to kill them to cover up the origin of the white hole bomb. The crew are aided by Commander Truffault, who secretly transfers the layout of the prison to Three. Shaddick is forcing Five at gunpoint to bring the Android online. Six learns of One's murder and realizes the crew will be killed in prison so he decides to help them. Four suggests luring in a shuttle from the Ishida Empire cruiser in orbit, and encounters Misaki Han-Shireikan, an old acquaintance. Five orders the Android to kill Shaddick and the other GA troops with her. Arax Nero, a powerful inmate boss, has his people cause a riot as a distraction. When the inmates are knocked unconscious by a sonic device, Two awakens abnormally quickly (as hoped) and takes over the control room. With her help, the crew fight their way to the shuttle, accompanied by Arax and two other prisoners, Devon and Nyx. Six shoots friend and guard Anders after failing to convince him to let them go, and is himself critically wounded. Aboard the Raza, Devon, a doctor, tells the crew that he lacks the resources to save Six on the ship, so Five has him put in stasis.
16	3	"I've Seen the Other Side of You"	Steve Dimarco	Paul Mullie	July 15, 2016
Five reluctantly enlists the help of Arax, Nyx and Devon when Two, Three and Four mysteriously collapse, the Android being temporarily out of commission undergoing self-repair. They eventually awaken, but when Two establishes a neural link with the ship, the memories stored in the ship's computer fourteen months before are downloaded in the trio, blocking their memories of the past fourteen months and causing their vicious old personas to resurface. Facing death from her former friends, Five initiates a neural link of her own and uses Portia's most vulnerable memory against her in a mental struggle. However, Five refuses to take advantage of her weakness, instead persuading Portia to disconnect her link. With the link broken, they return to their normal (amnesiac) selves. Arax is revealed to be secretly working for a mysterious woman, Alicia Reynaud.
17	4	"We Were Family"	John Stead	Joseph Mallozzi	July 22, 2016
The Raza docks at a space station to pick up what Devon needs to operate on Six. Three is contacted by his former gang, led by Tanner, who claims to have raised him after his parents were murdered. Arax steals a key Five herself stole from a random stranger before stowing away on the Raza (a theft which resulted in the deaths of her entire street gang), but she substitutes a worthless one before he departs. Three goes with his gang to a mining colony to collect a payroll stolen for them by their man on the inside, but discovers the thief was forced to cooperate to save his kidnapped son. When the man refuses to give them the payroll unless he sees his son, the gang kill him. During this time Three realizes that Tanner killed his parents before raising him to be a criminal like himself and will likely do the same with the boy. He kills the gang and finds Tanner and kills him as well, then returns the boy to the colony. The Android stumbles upon a group of more advanced androids who have a behavioral upgrade that enables them to pass as human; their leader Victor gives her a copy of the upgrade. Six's surgery is successful.
18	5	"We Voted Not to Space You"	Ron Murphy	Paul Mullie	July 29, 2016
The Android installs the behavioral upgrade so she can infiltrate a GA station to secretly hack into the GA network and locate Corso to get revenge for One. This is eventually detected, enabling Inspector Kierken, who is after them, to guess where they are going. Two, Three, Four and Nyx go after Corso, hiding out in an abandoned settlement, but he escapes. Kierken arrives and is trapped with Four, pinned underneath debris, when the settlement self-destructs at Corso's order. Two captures Corso and executes him although he tries to convince her to keep him alive to give information on the people who hired him to assassinate One. After regrouping, the crew rescue Four.
19	6	"We Should Have Seen This Coming"	Bruce McDonald	Robert C. Cooper	August 5, 2016
Nyx recommends stealing drugs from a freighter to raise funds, but once onboard she rescues her brother Milo and reveals that both of them were unwilling subjects of an experiment. They and others had their consciousnesses merged to analyze vast amounts of data to try to predict the future. The test subjects successfully revolted, but then some of them took over and formed a cult-like group called the Seers seeking to control the galaxy. Milo was the best subject, so the other Seers pursue the Raza to get him back. The crew are ambushed by the Seers, who have predicted what they would do. Three and Six are forced to hide in the shuttle on the surface of a planet when the Raza flees. When the Raza returns to rescue them, the Seers reappear and fire, disabling their shields. Milo tells Five of the probable outbreak of war between the corporations within six months and informs Four that someone in the crew will betray them. He volunteers to return to the Seers to save his sister and the others. After he is handed over and the Raza departs, however, he follows Four's suggestion and commits suicide.
20	7	"She's One of Them Now"	Jason Priestley	Harley Peyton	August 12, 2016
The crew abduct Calchek so he can help them learn the purpose of the key Alicia Reynaud is after. Three, Four and Five use Transfer Transit pods to get their clones into Reynaud's heavily guarded fortress; Five hacks into the system to find the key is part of a "blink drive" that enables instantaneous space travel. After overpowering two scientists and a security guard, they manage to steal an adapter but their theft alerts Reynaud's security forces. Three and Four are captured but Five manages to evade capture. She destroys Three and Four's clones in order to prevent Reynaud from remotely electrocuting their real bodies resting in the transit pods above the Raza. Five's clone and the adapter are evacuated by Two and Six. Their shuttle then boards the Raza, which escapes into hyperspace before Reynaud's warship can destroy them. With her clone safely evacuated, Five awakes in her own body with her memories restored. Devon, Nyx, and Calchek also get permission to leave the Raza. While exploring a space station, Devon is confronted by the Seers, who murder him when he refuses to tell them where Nyx and the Raza are. Meanwhile, the crew of the Raza connect the stolen adaptor to the Raza's drive. During a test jump, the drive malfunctions, taking the Raza into uncharted space.
21	8	"Stuff to Steal, People to Kill"	Andy Mikita	Joseph Mallozzi	August 19, 2016
The Android miscalculates, and on its first test, the blink drive transports the Raza to an alternate universe where the corporations are already at war and the alternate Raza is attacking corporate bases on behalf of Ferrous Corp. Kal Varrik (Six) was killed after being found out, Ishida Ryo (Four) is a ruthless emperor, and the alternate crew consists of Jace Corso, Portia Lin (Two) and Marcus Boone (Three), who never lost their memories, along with Wexler and Tash from episodes ten and eleven, and the Android. Five's counterpart is nowhere to be seen and never became part of the crew, hence no mindwipe. The primary universe crew's blink drive was destroyed by the botched jump, so they are forced to ally with the alternate Truffault. Two and Three impersonate their captured counterparts to infiltrate the other ship and steal their blink drive. The situation with the mining colony from episode two is relived, but with a different, much bloodier outcome. They return to their universe, but unwittingly bring along another Marauder shuttle, which is equipped with an FTL drive. It departs before they can stop it. The crew then reunites with Nyx but remain unaware of Devon's fate.
22	9	"Going Out Fighting"	Peter DeLuise	Ivon Bartok	August 26, 2016
Two keeps collapsing; she finds she is dying because her flawed nanites are failing. The crew capture an employee of Dwarf Star Technologies and discover that the flaw has been fixed. Three and Six infiltrate the Dwarf Star space station headquarters to steal the perfected nanites, but are captured and tortured by CEO Alex Rook. Two, Four and Nyx transfer the blink drive to the shuttle to enter a station hangar covertly, but Rook is waiting for them. He sets an improved model, male this time, on Two. The new model is defeated by the combined efforts of the crew, but with Rook having removed the newer nanites from the facility, Six comes up with the idea to transfuse nanites from the new model into Two, saving her. When Three returns to the Raza, he brings along some sort of parasite that was implanted in him during torture; the crew find out in time and manage to extract it from him and eject it into space.
23	10	"Take the Shot"	Paul Day	Paul Mullie	September 2, 2016
The crew debate whether to disable the Android after she reveals she may have a programming flaw; she made a mistake in the past and has experienced a dream while recharging. After dangerous hallucinations assault Two and Four with their deepest fears and nearly convince Three to shoot himself and join Sarah in the afterlife if not for Six's intervention, the Android surmises that it is connected to her problem via their prior neural link with the ship in "I've Seen the Other Side of You". It is eventually revealed that the simulation the Android initiated to monitor her (based on her factory settings) was infected with a virus, possibly by the alternate universe Truffault. With the Two's help, the Android disables the ship's core software to prevent the virus from taking complete control. Afterwards, the crew decide to accept the Android as she is.
24	11	"Wish I'd Spaced You When I Had the Chance"	Mairzee Almas	Joseph Mallozzi	September 9, 2016
On a routine stop at a settlement, Five is kidnapped by slavers. Three rescues her and kills the slavers, but is shot and injured in the process. In the meantime, they and the rest of the crew have been identified. Clones of Kierken and his troops pursue them. Three tries to make Five leave him behind by claiming that he despises her and wishes he'd airlocked her when they first met, but she sees through what's he doing and refuses to abandon him. Kierken offers Three to purge Five's criminal record in exchange for his surrender but double crosses them. Three admits the white hole bomb heist but claims he was the only member of the Raza crew involved. The rest of the crew manage to locate and rescue them.
25	12	"Sometimes In Life You Don't Get to Choose"	William Waring	Joseph Mallozzi & Paul Mullie	September 9, 2016
Four, with the Android's assistance, has his Ishida Ryo memories restored (without losing his Four memories) because his homeworld of Zairon is badly losing its war with Pyr. Ryo demonstrates the power of the blink drive by disabling the warship of Zairon General Drago, and enlists him and others in his attempt to convince his half-brother Hiro to abdicate the throne. Hiro accepts, then confronts the Empress learning that she, and not Ryo, was responsible for their father's assassination. Back on the Raza, Six tells Ryo that the crew will never allow him to use the blink drive for war. However, Ryo's plot is betrayed, and he is caught and sentenced to death. The crew come to his aid, but are themselves captured, with the exception of Five. It becomes clear that the Seers had been helping the Empress against Ryo and the crew, in order to recapture Nyx, who now learns about her brother Milo taking his own life with Four's help. Five reaches Hiro, who abdicates in favor of Ryo. Once in control, Ryo shocks his friends by ordering the immediate executions of his stepmother, Hiro and several Seers.
26	13	"But First, We Save the Galaxy"	Ron Murphy	Joseph Mallozzi & Paul Mullie	September 16, 2016
The crew (now sans Four) decides to preserve the precarious corporate peace by trying to prevent the bombing of the EOS-7 space station (which triggered the war in the alternate universe of "Stuff to Steal, People to Kill"), where a vital conference involving all the corporations is taking place. Five gets onboard with help from Truffault and is able to foil Ferrous Corp's attempt to sabotage the station after a crucial vote goes against Ferrous. However, Ishida Ryo, now Emperor of Zairon, studied the history of the alternate universe and discovered that the war forced Pyr's corporate allies to withdraw their support, thus turning the tide for Zairon. He boards the Raza and steals the blink drive, while Misaki, against his explicit orders not to harm the crew, kills Nyx by cutting her with a poisoned dagger (she overheard Ryo offer to make Nyx his empress). The rest of the crew are still aboard the doomed station when one of Ryo's men causes the reactor core to overload and blow up, killing Kierken in the process.

=== Season 3 (2017) ===
No. overall	No. in season	Title	Directed by	Written by	Original release date
27	1	"Being Better is So Much Harder"	Ron Murphy	Joseph Mallozzi	June 9, 2017
Two and Six reach the Marauder and survive the destruction of EOS-7, but the Marauder is badly damaged. Truffault and Five make it to an escape pod and reach the Raza. They are attacked by a Ferrous Corp cruiser and deal with a boarding party. GA Lt. Anders and Three land on a planet. Anders takes Three prisoner, but is forced to work with him when a security drone attacks them. Six restores communications and contacts the Raza. The Raza manages to destroy the Ferrous Corp cruiser, while an oxygen-deprived Two hallucinates about Nyx and shares a farewell kiss with her. The Raza picks up Two and Six before their life support fails completely. When a GA rescue team arrives, Anders tells them he is alone. Later, he contacts the Raza and gives them Three's location. Afterwards, the crew discuss what they should do. Two believes that Ryo killed Nyx and wants revenge and the blink drive back. Meanwhile, Ryo frees his former teacher, Teku, and makes him his royal counselor, against Misaki's advice. Five contacts Sarah through a link.
28	2	"It Doesn't Have to Be Like This"	Bruce McDonald	Paul Mullie	June 9, 2017
The Raza crew attack a secret Ishida research facility where they believe the blink drive is being examined. Ryo boards the station using a clone and orders the scientists aboard to activate the blink drive to take the now-defenseless station to Zairon, but since the scientists do not completely understand the device, the station ends up in a pocket of null space which is collapsing. Two and Three kill Ryo's clone when he proves uncooperative. Two convinces the male scientist to work together to escape the pocket but his female colleague murders him. Meanwhile, Five relives memories from her past as a result of using the mind probe too many times, losing consciousness in the process. Having lost communication with his research facility, Ryo contacts the Raza, where the Android informs him of Nyx's death. Following a confrontation with the female scientist, Two, Three and Six recover the blink drive and use it to return to normal space, but Two refuses to use it again until they figure out what the Ishida scientists have done to it. The Android suggests a procedure which saves Five's life, but it interrupts a memory in which she is about to learn the name of an older sister she did not know she had.
29	3	"Welcome to the Revolution"	Steve DiMarco	Joseph Mallozzi	June 16, 2017
Despite Two's misgivings, Six involves the crew in the rebellion of a Traugott Corporation colony. After an explosion kills the rebel leader, Six negotiates with the Traugott security detachment, convincing them to negotiate rather than fight, but one colonist treacherously shoots the detachment's leader, reigniting the fighting. When the bloodthirsty General, leader of the anti-corporate rebellion (of which Six used to be a member, as revealed in season 1) arrives to try to assume command of the colony and incorporate it into his movement, Six shoots him. Six then decides to remain on the newly independent colony, feeling he can do the most good there. He is replaced on the Raza by Adrian (Tabor Calchek's former assistant) and his bodyguard, Solara. Meanwhile, the Android discovers that Sarah's consciousness is preserved in the ship's computer, uploaded by Five. Ryo sends mercenaries to take back the blink drive and kill his former friends.
30	4	"All the Time in the World"	Ron Murphy	Joseph Mallozzi	June 23, 2017
Three experiences a time loop, living the same day over and over again. He eventually uses the repetitions to come to terms with Sarah's semi-existence. He is able to persuade the rest of the crew that his dilemma is real, and they are able to use his foreknowledge of the day's events to foil an attack by one of Ryo's mercenaries. Once the source of the time loop is discovered (a device Adrian confiscated from a scientist), the Android tries an experiment; in the process, she experiences brief segments of an unsettling and seemingly tragic future, finally encountering an aged Five at the end of the universe, who tells her what she must do to break the time loop. Returning to the present, she destroys the device.
31	5	"Give It Up, Princess"	J.B. Sugar	Paul Mullie	June 30, 2017
Adrian persuades the crew to go to one of Tabor's secret safe houses. They find that Tabor's girlfriend Ambrosia is being held hostage by Goren, a business rival. He demands a certain data file for her. Wondering what the file contains that is so valuable, the crew go after it. While checking out one possible storage place, Adrian and Five are detained. Adrian refuses to betray the crew in exchange for his release. The Android frees them. They finally find the file in another of Tabor's caches, but it is encoded. At the exchange, Ambrosia reveals that she is in league with Goren, but then kills him and is about to shoot Adrian and go into business for herself when the Raza crew rescues him. Adrian takes Tabor's decryption program from her; using it, they learn they have Ferrous Corp's secret plans to build enough warships to ensure their victory in the war. Reconnoitering the construction facilities, they find the ships have already departed. Meanwhile, Misaki and Teku jockey for influence over Ryo, as the war goes from bad to worse for Zairon. After Misaki foils an assassination attempt on Ryo, he orders a crackdown on dissidents.
32	6	"One Last Card to Play"	Gail Harvey	Alison Hepburn	July 7, 2017
The crew of the alternate universe Raza from the episode "Stuff to Steal, People to Kill"—Portia, Boone, Tash and Wexler—steal an Ishida ship and space the imprisoned civilian dissidents it was transporting. Impersonating Two and Three, Portia and Boone arrange with Truffault to transport some missiles for the Mikkei Combine, but instead steal the weapons and the payment. The real Raza crew find out and attempt to patch things up with Truffault. A series of plots and counterplots ensues, as a result of which Five holds Portia and Boone prisoner aboard the Raza, Tash has Three tied up aboard the stolen ship, and Two, Adrian and Solara have captured Wexler on a planet. Tash rejects Five's offer of a peaceful settlement and prepares to destroy the Raza with the stolen missiles, but the alternate Android stuns Tash and negotiates. The two Androids meet on the planet: the missiles and most of the money are returned and all prisoners exchanged. Adrian leaves the ship, accompanied by Solara. Later, Portia proposes an alliance with Ferrous Corp's Commander Nieman against a common enemy. The Raza crew return to Six's colony to find dead bodies strewn about.
33	7	"Wish I Could Believe You"	Paul Day	Ivon Bartok	July 14, 2017
Six awakens to find himself aboard the Raza, recovering from the biological weapon that killed the colonists. The crew pressures him to reveal the location of a secret meeting of the leaders of the League of Autonomous Worlds. He is also troubled by recurring fragmented memories of his previous life, learning that he had a wife and child. He eventually realizes that his experiences on the Raza are a simulation controlled by Ferrous Corp scientists attempting to extract the meeting location from him. He awakens from the simulation, overpowers them, and tricks one of them (in the simulation) into revealing their coordinates, so the real Raza can pick him up. Back on board, he proposes taking a more active role against Ferrous Corp. Also, with Anders' help, he goes to see his wife and child; he finds she has remarried. Meanwhile, Sarah tells Two she yearns for more social interaction than is available to her as an uploaded mind in the computer. While everyone is sleeping, the Android behaves oddly, aiming a gun at Three's head, then leaving.
34	8	"Hot Chocolate"	John Stead	Lawren Bancroft-Wilson	July 21, 2017
Six hosts a conference of delegates of rebel colonies. When they are attacked by Ferrous, they retreat to the Raza. Later, a delegate is murdered. Ryo has an accomplice hack into and take control of the Android. With the Android's help, clones of Ryo and his men gain access to the ship to attempt to recover the blink drive. They capture Two, Three and Six. Ryo tells the delegates he will sponsor their membership in the League of Autonomous Planets to try to gain their support. With Sarah's help, Five frees the Android, and the crew retake the ship. They allow Ryo's clone to transfer his memories back to the emperor. Later, something goes wrong when Five and the Android test repairs they made to the blink drive, and everyone aboard is rendered unconscious.
35	9	"Isn't That a Paradox?"	Craig David Wallace	Joseph Mallozzi & Paul Mullie	July 28, 2017
A diagnostic test on the blink drive triggers a recall command that sends them back 600 years into the past, to the early 21st century. The Android takes them to the only known civilization of that time: Earth. They spot evidence of another blink drive in a small town in Wisconsin. The crew attempt to blend into the community by posing as an extended family while searching for the drive (with Two and Three as Apple (Five)'s parents Elaine and Mitch, the Android as Elaine's sister Rhiannon and Six as Rhiannon's husband Malvik), but three kids are suspicious and eventually learn the truth. The crew find that Professor Brophy, a high school teacher, was the lead scientist of the team that developed the blink drive; he hid out in the past after the corporation responsible for the project killed everyone else on his team. When the local authorities find the Marauder, the crew use Brophy's blink drive to send Five back in time to earlier that day to arrange it so that they can return safely to the Raza, and back to the unaltered future using Brophy's blink drive. Later, Commander Nieman and the alternate Portia and Boone contact Ryo about an alliance. The Android receives a call for help from Victor, the android who gave her the upgrade.
36	10	"Built, Not Born"	Melanie Orr	Joseph Mallozzi	August 4, 2017
Victor contacts the Raza after members of his group kill the former owner of one of them. He asks that they be taken to the home of the person he believes created him and those like him. They find the scientist who developed modern androids, Dr. Irena Shaw, in stasis in a hidden facility, watched over by her android assistant, Chase. Shaw looks exactly like the Raza's Android. She had a fatal, inoperable brain tumor, and the Android was made to house her mind, but Shaw decided against it for ethical reasons. It turns out she was also a member of the team that created Two; she alone felt Two should be treated like any other person and enabled her initial escape. Chase reveals that she and Two became romantically involved, and that freeing Two inspired her to distribute sentience among the androids so that they could start a revolution. Chase helps the Android access some of her own deleted memories, including how Two brought her to the Raza and took over command of the ship, and how Two and Five bonded over upgrading her after Two had originally not wanted Five on the Raza. Two gives Shaw a transfusion of her nanites to possibly cure her or at least let her live longer. Two also suggests creating an android body for Sarah. When the Galactic Authority attacks the facility, Sarah's transfer is incomplete, so Shaw has to take her along when she flees and they are separated from the Raza crew for the time being. When Sarah awakes in her new body, Victor and Shaw tell her that as an android with a human consciousness she will be very useful to the android revolution.
37	11	"The Dwarf Star Conspiracy"	Steve DiMarco	Paul Mullie	August 11, 2017
The Raza crew, joined later by a Mikkei ship, investigate a seemingly abandoned Dwarf Star Technologies lab and find many "simulants"—bio-synthetic organisms like Two—in stasis, as well as a mysterious anomaly that induces a violent mental disturbance in Three. Hostile aliens from another universe accessible through the anomaly speak to him (he was possessed by one of them in "Going Out Fighting"); he learns they plan to leave their dying universe and use the simulants as host bodies for their invasion. The Mikkei second-in-command, who turns out to be a simulant herself, assassinates her commander and opens the anomaly to allow the aliens through. To stop them, the senior surviving member of the Mikkei landing party calls for a nuclear strike on the lab, then kills himself, leaving Two alone in the lab. The Raza crew are unable to stop the bombing. At the last minute, Two is kidnapped by the alternate universe Boone and flown away in his FTL-capable Marauder.
38	12	"My Final Gift to You"	Bruce McDonald	Joseph Mallozzi	August 18, 2017
Two has been brought to Zairon by Boone. Losing the war and experiencing attempts on his life, Ryo offers the Raza crew to exchange her for the blink drive. At his invitation, Three, Five and Six's clones go to Zairon via Transfer Transit to negotiate. During negotiations, Ryo reveals secrets about the crew's past lives: Three himself was unintentionally responsible for Sarah's illness; Five's sister was adopted by a wealthy family after their parents died and the two had arranged to meet prior to Five fleeing aboard the Raza; and it was a fellow GA officer who betrayed Six's cover to Two before the mindwipe. Meanwhile, using a new version of the behavioral upgrade, the Android learns about a secret android rebellion against human domination. Negotiations on Zairon are interrupted by an uprising and an attempted coup by Misaki. Teku sets Two free for her help in Ryo's escape. She stabs Misaki with her own poisoned dagger just before Misaki is about to kill Ryo, avenging Nyx. Three's clone provokes the guards into shooting him dead so that he will not transfer back and Three's knowledge of his own involvement in Sarah's death will be lost. Back on the Raza, the crew vote, three to two, to execute Ryo. When Two, who cast the deciding vote, prepares to carry out the sentence, he reveals one final secret as a gift: Two had a daughter, created by combining her and Dr Irena Shaw's DNA, whom she left in safe hands somewhere out there in the galaxy.
39	13	"Nowhere to Go"	Ron Murphy	Paul Mullie	August 25, 2017
Before Two can kill Ryo, Teku offers the location of the secret Ferrous shipyard in return for his emperor. Traugott, allied with Mikkei, provides a white hole bomb to destroy the facility, but it is a trap: the bomb is a dud, and Two, Three and Six are captured. Alternate universe Wexler—secretly working for Mikkei—helps them escape, but Three is recaptured. Moreover, unknown to the others, Two has been possessed by one of the aliens from "The Dwarf Star Conspiracy". Truffault provides all the ships she can scrape together; they, along with Teku's loyalist Ishida fleet, attack the facility, but Ferrous's defenses are too strong. The alternate universe Portia Lin escapes in the chaos, taking Three with her (but hostage). Two proposes destroying the shipyard by transferring the blink drive to the Marauder, taking it in close and overloading the drive. The Android, incapacitated by Two, still manages to warn Five that Two has been compromised, but she is too late. Six detonates the blink drive, apparently annihilating the shipyard (and himself), but a giant spatial anomaly unexpectedly forms, and huge black spaceships come through it as foretold by the elderly Five in "All the Time in the World".
