= List of comic-based television episodes directed by women =

The following is a list of female directors who have directed a television episode based on comics, including comic books, comic strips, manga, and graphic novels. The episodes may be live action, animated, anime, or a combination thereof.

== List ==
=== A-E ===
Director	Episode	Series	Based on	Type	U.S. release date
Marisol Adler	"The Sinnerman"	Lucifer	Lucifer by: Neil Gaiman; Sam Kieth; Mike Dringenberg	Live action	December 4, 2017
Marisol Adler	"Chapter Forty-Nine: Fire Walk with Me"	Riverdale	Archie Andrews by: John L. Goldwater; Bob Montana; Vic Bloom	Live action	March 6, 2019
Lexi Alexander	"Beyond Redemption"	Arrow	Green Arrow by: Mort Weisinger; George Papp	Live action	October 28, 2015
Lexi Alexander	"Truth, Justice and the American Way"	Supergirl	Supergirl by: Otto Binder; Al Plastino	Live action	February 22, 2016
Mairzee Almas	"Nemesis"	Smallville	Superman by: Jerry Siegel; Joe Shuster	Live action	April 26, 2007
Mairzee Almas	"Action"	Smallville	Superman by: Jerry Siegel; Joe Shuster	Live action	October 25, 2007
Mairzee Almas	"Instinct"	Smallville	Superman by: Jerry Siegel; Joe Shuster	Live action	October 9, 2008
Mairzee Almas	"Identity"	Smallville	Superman by: Jerry Siegel; Joe Shuster	Live action	October 30, 2008
Mairzee Almas	"Hex"	Smallville	Superman by: Jerry Siegel; Joe Shuster	Live action	March 26, 2009
Mairzee Almas	"Metallo"	Smallville	Superman by: Jerry Siegel; Joe Shuster	Live action	October 2, 2009
Mairzee Almas	"Disciple"	Smallville	Superman by: Jerry Siegel; Joe Shuster	Live action	January 29, 2010
Mairzee Almas	"Supergirl"	Smallville	Superman by: Jerry Siegel; Joe Shuster	Live action	October 8, 2010
Mairzee Almas	"Icarus"	Smallville	Superman by: Jerry Siegel; Joe Shuster	Live action	December 10, 2010
Mairzee Almas	"Cape Town"; S2 E9	iZombie	iZombie by: Chris Roberson; Michael Allred	Live action	December 8, 2015
Mairzee Almas	"Fifty Shades of Grey Matter"; S2 E11	iZombie	iZombie by: Chris Roberson; Michael Allred	Live action	February 2, 2016
Mairzee Almas	"Pour Some Sugar, Zombie"; S2 E16	iZombie	iZombie by: Chris Roberson; Michael Allred	Live action	March 29, 2016
Mairzee Almas	"St. Lucifer"	Lucifer	Lucifer by: Neil Gaiman; Sam Kieth; Mike Dringenberg	Live action	April 11, 2016
Mairzee Almas	"Wish I'd Spaced You When I Had the Chance"; S2 E11	Dark Matter	Dark Matter by: Joseph Mallozzi; Paul Mullie	Live action	September 9, 2016
Mairzee Almas	"Sin-Eater"	Lucifer	Lucifer by: Neil Gaiman; Sam Kieth; Mike Dringenberg	Live action	October 10, 2016
Mairzee Almas	"Doomworld"	Legends of Tomorrow	Firestorm by: Gerry Conway; Al Milgrom	Live action	March 28, 2017
Mairzee Almas	"Eat, Pray, Liv"; S3 E3	iZombie	iZombie by: Chris Roberson; Michael Allred	Live action	April 18, 2017
Mairzee Almas	"Missing"	Arrow	Green Arrow by: Mort Weisinger; George Papp	Live action	May 17, 2017
Mairzee Almas	"Zari"	Legends of Tomorrow	Firestorm by: Gerry Conway; Al Milgrom	Live action	October 24, 2017
Mairzee Almas	"Welcome to the Jungle"	Legends of Tomorrow	Firestorm by: Gerry Conway; Al Milgrom	Live action	November 21, 2017
Mairzee Almas	"All for Nothing"	Arrow	Green Arrow by: Mort Weisinger; George Papp	Live action	February 1, 2018
Mairzee Almas	"AKA Sole Survivor"	Jessica Jones	Jessica Jones by: Brian Michael Bendis; Michael Gaydos	Live action	March 8, 2018
Mairzee Almas	"The Fanatical"	Supergirl	Supergirl by: Otto Binder; Al Plastino	Live action	May 21, 2018
Mairzee Almas	"Heart of the Dragon"	Iron Fist	Iron Fist by: Roy Thomas; Gil Kane	Live action	September 7, 2018
Mairzee Almas	"A.K.A. I Wish"	Jessica Jones	Jessica Jones by: Brian Michael Bendis; Michael Gaydos	Live action	June 14, 2019
Ana Lily Amirpour	"Chapter 10"	Legion	Legion by: Chris Claremont; Bill Sienkiewicz	Live action	April 10, 2018
Allison Anders	"Chapter Seven: In a Lonely Place"	Riverdale	Archie Andrews by: John L. Goldwater; Bob Montana; Vic Bloom	Live action	March 9, 2017
Allison Anders	"Chapter Fifteen: Nighthawks"	Riverdale	Archie Andrews by: John L. Goldwater; Bob Montana; Vic Bloom	Live action	October 18, 2017
Carin-Anne Anderson	"First Flight"; S1 E1a	The Rocketeer	Rocketeer by Dave Stevens	Animated	November 8, 2019
Carin-Anne Anderson	"Pilot Error"; S1 E1b	The Rocketeer	Rocketeer by Dave Stevens	Animated	November 8, 2019
Carin-Anne Anderson	"Ground Control to Rocketeer"; S1 E3a	The Rocketeer	Rocketeer by Dave Stevens	Animated	November 15, 2019
Carin-Anne Anderson	"Carnival Caper"; S1 E4a	The Rocketeer	Rocketeer by Dave Stevens	Animated	November 22, 2019
Carin-Anne Anderson	"Flight Class Heroes"; S1 E5b	The Rocketeer	Rocketeer by Dave Stevens	Animated	December 6, 2019
Carin-Anne Anderson	"Hypnotic Hughesville"; S1 E6a	The Rocketeer	Rocketeer by Dave Stevens	Animated	December 13, 2019
Andi Armaganian	"In Search of Lost Time"	Supergirl	Supergirl by: Otto Binder; Al Plastino	Live action	April 23, 2018
Andi Armaganian	"Docket No. 11-19-41-73"	Arrow	Green Arrow by: Mort Weisinger; George Papp	Live action	May 3, 2018
Andi Armaganian	"My Name Is Emiko Queen"	Arrow	Green Arrow by: Mort Weisinger; George Papp	Live action	January 21, 2019
Andi Armaganian	"Stand and Deliver"	Supergirl	Supergirl by: Otto Binder; Al Plastino	Live action	March 10, 2019
Andi Armaganian	"Ship Broken"	Legends of Tomorrow	Firestorm by: Gerry Conway; Al Milgrom	Live action	April 7, 2020
Jamie Babbit	"Childish Things"	Supergirl	Supergirl by: Otto Binder; Al Plastino	Live action	January 18, 2016
Carol Banker	"Cyborg Patrol"	Doom Patrol	Doom Patrol by: Arnold Drake; Bob Haney; Bruno Premiani	Live action	May 3, 2019
Carol Banker	"Darkness on the Edge of Town"	Swamp Thing	Swamp Thing by: Len Wein; Bernie Wrightson	Live action	June 21, 2019
Neema Barnette	"If It Ain't Rough, It Ain't Right"	Luke Cage	Luke Cage by: Archie Goodwin; George Tuska; Roy Thomas; John Romita Sr.	Live action	June 22, 2018
Laura Belsey	"Canary Cry"	Arrow	Green Arrow by: Mort Weisinger; George Papp	Live action	April 27, 2016
Laura Belsey	"Human Target"	Arrow	Green Arrow by: Mort Weisinger; George Papp	Live action	November 2, 2016
Laura Belsey	"Honor Thy Fathers"	Arrow	Green Arrow by: Mort Weisinger; George Papp	Live action	May 10, 2017
Laura Belsey	"Tribute"	Arrow	Green Arrow by: Mort Weisinger; George Papp	Live action	October 19, 2017
Laura Belsey	"Girls Night Out"	The Flash	Flash by: Robert Kanigher; Carmine Infantino	Live action	November 7, 2017
Laura Belsey	"Irreconcilable Differences"	Arrow	Green Arrow by: Mort Weisinger; George Papp	Live action	December 7, 2017
Laura Belsey	"Les Enfants du Sang"	Preacher	Preacher by: Garth Ennis; Steve Dillon	Live action	July 29, 2018
Laura Belsey	"The Longbow Hunters"	Arrow	Green Arrow by: Mort Weisinger; George Papp	Live action	October 22, 2018
Tessa Blake	"Spanking the Zombie"; S3 E5	iZombie	iZombie by: Chris Roberson; Michael Allred	Live action	May 2, 2017
Tessa Blake	"My Really Fair Lady"; S4 E6	iZombie	iZombie by: Chris Roberson; Michael Allred	Live action	April 9, 2018
Tessa Blake	"The Fresh Princess"; S5 E9	iZombie	iZombie by: Chris Roberson; Michael Allred	Live action	June 27, 2019
Jessika Borsiczky	"O, Ye of Little Faith, Father"	Lucifer	Lucifer by: Neil Gaiman; Sam Kieth; Mike Dringenberg	Live action	May 8, 2019
Jessika Borsiczky	"Two Player"	Cloak & Dagger	Cloak and Dagger by: Bill Mantlo; Ed Hannigan	Live action	May 16, 2019
Sarah Boyd	"O Come, All Ye Thankful"	The Flash	Flash by: Robert Kanigher; Carmine Infantino	Live action	November 27, 2018
Sarah Boyd	"A.K.A. A Lotta Worms"	Jessica Jones	Jessica Jones by: Brian Michael Bendis; Michael Gaydos	Live action	June 14, 2019
Charlotte Brändström	"A.W.O.L."	Arrow	Green Arrow by: Mort Weisinger; George Papp	Live action	January 27, 2016
Uta Briesewitz	"AKA I've Got the Blues"	Jessica Jones	Jessica Jones by: Brian Michael Bendis; Michael Gaydos	Live action	November 20, 2015
Uta Briesewitz	"AKA Playland"	Jessica Jones	Jessica Jones by: Brian Michael Bendis; Michael Gaydos	Live action	March 8, 2018
Uta Briesewitz	"Under Leaf Pluck Lotus"	Iron Fist	Iron Fist by: Roy Thomas; Gil Kane	Live action	March 17, 2017
Uta Briesewitz	"Take Shelter"	The Defenders	Daredevil by; Stan Lee; Bill Everett; Jessica Jones by; Brian Michael Bendis; Michael Gaydos; Luke Cage by; Archie Goodwin; George Tuska; Roy Thomas; John Romita Sr.; Iron Fist by; Roy Thomas; Gil Kane	Live action	August 18, 2017
Tricia Brock	"From the Shadows It Watches"; S1 E6	Outcast	Outcast by: Robert Kirkman; Paul Azaceta	Live action	July 15, 2016
Tricia Brock	"Bad Penny"; S2 E1	Outcast	Outcast by: Robert Kirkman; Paul Azaceta	Live action	April 3, 2017
Allison Liddi-Brown	"gaMe changer"	The Gifted	X-Men by: Stan Lee; Jack Kirby	Live action	December 4, 2018
Allison Liddi-Brown	"Gimme Shelter"	Runaways	Runaways by: Brian K. Vaughan; Adrian Alphona	Live action	December 21, 2018
Myrha Bushman	"Worlds Within Worlds"; S2 E5	Fantastic Four	Fantastic Four by: Stan Lee; Jack Kirby	Animated	October 21, 1995
Gina Prince-Bythewood	"First Light"	Cloak & Dagger	Cloak and Dagger by: Bill Mantlo; Ed Hannigan	Live action	June 7, 2018
Katie Cassidy	"Leap of Faith"	Arrow	Green Arrow by: Mort Weisinger; George Papp	Live action	October 29, 2019
Deborah Chow	"Lead Horse Back to Stable"	Iron Fist	Iron Fist by: Roy Thomas; Gil Kane	Live action	March 17, 2017
Deborah Chow	"AKA God Help the Hobo"	Jessica Jones	Jessica Jones by: Brian Michael Bendis; Michael Gaydos	Live action	March 8, 2018
S. J. Clarkson	"AKA Ladies Night"	Jessica Jones	Jessica Jones by: Brian Michael Bendis; Michael Gaydos	Live action	November 20, 2015
S. J. Clarkson	"AKA Crush Syndrome"	Jessica Jones	Jessica Jones by: Brian Michael Bendis; Michael Gaydos	Live action	November 20, 2015
S. J. Clarkson	"The H Word"	The Defenders	Daredevil by; Stan Lee; Bill Everett; Jessica Jones by; Brian Michael Bendis; Michael Gaydos; Luke Cage by; Archie Goodwin; George Tuska; Roy Thomas; John Romita Sr.; Iron Fist by; Roy Thomas; Gil Kane	Live action	August 18, 2017
S. J. Clarkson	"Mean Right Hook"	The Defenders	Daredevil by; Stan Lee; Bill Everett; Jessica Jones by; Brian Michael Bendis; Michael Gaydos; Luke Cage by; Archie Goodwin; George Tuska; Roy Thomas; John Romita Sr.; Iron Fist by; Roy Thomas; Gil Kane	Live action	August 18, 2017
Jennifer Coyle	"Reaction"	The Spectacular Spider-Man	Spider-Man by: Stan Lee; Steve Ditko	Animated	May 3, 2008
Jennifer Coyle	"Group Therapy"; S1 E11	The Spectacular Spider-Man	Spider-Man by: Stan Lee; Steve Ditko	Animated	May 31, 2008
Jennifer Coyle	"Blueprints"; S2 E1	The Spectacular Spider-Man	Spider-Man by: Stan Lee; Steve Ditko	Animated	June 22, 2009
Jennifer Coyle	"Shear Strength"; S2 E4	The Spectacular Spider-Man	Spider-Man by: Stan Lee; Steve Ditko	Animated	July 6, 2009
Jennifer Coyle	"Identity Crisis"; S2 E7	The Spectacular Spider-Man	Spider-Man by: Stan Lee; Steve Ditko	Animated	July 27, 2009
Jennifer Coyle	"Gangland"; S2 E10	The Spectacular Spider-Man	Spider-Man by: Stan Lee; Steve Ditko	Animated	October 21, 2009
Hanelle Culpepper	"King Shark"	The Flash	Flash by: Robert Kanigher; Carmine Infantino	Live action	February 23, 2016
Hanelle Culpepper	"Time Bomb"	Gotham	Gotham City by: Bill Finger; Bob Kane	Live action	November 21, 2016
Hanelle Culpepper	"I Know Who You Are"	The Flash	Flash by: Robert Kanigher; Carmine Infantino	Live action	May 2, 2017
Hanelle Culpepper	"Pieces of a Broken Mirror"	Gotham	Gotham City by: Bill Finger; Bob Kane	Live action	March 1, 2018
Hanelle Culpepper	"The Last Heartbreak"	Lucifer	Lucifer by: Neil Gaiman; Sam Kieth; Mike Dringenberg	Live action	March 19, 2018
Hanelle Culpepper	"Lose Yourself"	The Flash	Flash by: Robert Kanigher; Carmine Infantino	Live action	April 17, 2018
Hanelle Culpepper	"Dark Side of the Moon"	Supergirl	Supergirl by: Otto Binder; Al Plastino	Live action	May 28, 2018
Holly Dale	"The Bridge"	Agents of S.H.I.E.L.D.	S.H.I.E.L.D. by: Stan Lee; Jack Kirby	Live action	December 10, 2013
Holly Dale	"A Hen in the Wolf House"	Agents of S.H.I.E.L.D.	S.H.I.E.L.D. by: Stan Lee; Jack Kirby	Live action	October 21, 2014
Roxann Dawson	"Eye Spy"	Agents of S.H.I.E.L.D.	S.H.I.E.L.D. by: Stan Lee; Jack Kirby	Live action	October 15, 2013
Roxann Dawson	"Ragtag"	Agents of S.H.I.E.L.D.	S.H.I.E.L.D. by: Stan Lee; Jack Kirby	Live action	May 6, 2014
Roxann Dawson	"Who You Really Are"	Agents of S.H.I.E.L.D.	S.H.I.E.L.D. by: Stan Lee; Jack Kirby	Live action	March 10, 2015
Roxann Dawson	"Rewind"	Runaways	Runaways by: Brian K. Vaughan; Adrian Alphona	Live action	November 21, 2017
Lisa Demaine	"Boo Normal"	Lucifer	Lucifer by: Neil Gaiman; Sam Kieth; Mike Dringenberg	Live action	May 28, 2018
Lisa Demaine	"Save Lucifer"	Lucifer	Lucifer by: Neil Gaiman; Sam Kieth; Mike Dringenberg	Live action	May 8, 2019
Lisa Demaine	"Nothing Lasts Forever"	Lucifer	Lucifer by: Neil Gaiman; Sam Kieth; Mike Dringenberg	Live action	May 28, 2021
Kate Dennis	"El Valero"	Preacher	Preacher by: Garth Ennis; Steve Dillon	Live action	July 17, 2016
Kate Dennis	"After Midnight"; S1 E8	The Tick	The Tick by Ben Edlund	Live action	February 23, 2018
Kate Dennis	"My Dinner with Android"	The Tick	The Tick by Ben Edlund	Live action	February 23, 2018
Kate Dennis	"Civil Wars"	Krypton	Krypton by: Jerry Siegel; Joe Shuster	Live action	April 25, 2018

=== F-J ===
Director	Episode	Series	Based on	Type	U.S. release date
Lauren Faust	"#TheLateBatsby"; S1 E1	DC Super Hero Girls	Wonder Woman by: William Moulton Marston; H. G. Peter	Animated	January 10, 2019
Anna Foerster	"AKA Start at the Beginning"	Jessica Jones	Jessica Jones by: Brian Michael Bendis; Michael Gaydos	Live action	March 8, 2018
Sheree Folkson	"Party Crashers"; S1 E4	The Tick	The Tick by Ben Edlund	Live action	August 25, 2017
Louise Friedberg	"The Day Before"; S1 E1	Y: The Last Man	Y: The Last Man by: Brian K. Vaughan; Pia Guerra	Live action	September 13, 2021
Louise Friedberg	"Would the World Be Kind"; S1 E2	Y: The Last Man	Y: The Last Man by: Brian K. Vaughan; Pia Guerra	Live action	September 13, 2021
Liz Friedlander	"outfoX"	The Gifted	X-Men by: Stan Lee; Jack Kirby	Live action	December 4, 2017
Liz Friedlander	"AKA Pray for My Patsy"	Jessica Jones	Jessica Jones by: Brian Michael Bendis; Michael Gaydos	Live action	March 8, 2018
Zetna Fuentes	"Dead Air"; S1 E8	iZombie	iZombie by: Chris Roberson; Michael Allred	Live action	May 5, 2015
Zetna Fuentes	"Physician, Heal Thy Selfie"; S2 E12	iZombie	iZombie by: Chris Roberson; Michael Allred	Live action	February 9, 2016
Zetna Fuentes	"AKA Ain't We Got Fun"	Jessica Jones	Jessica Jones by: Brian Michael Bendis; Michael Gaydos	Live action	March 8, 2018
Karen Gaviola	"Harvey Dent"	Gotham	Gotham City by: Bill Finger; Bob Kane	Live action	November 17, 2014
Karen Gaviola	"The Frenemy of My Enemy"	Agents of S.H.I.E.L.D.	S.H.I.E.L.D. by: Stan Lee; Jack Kirby	Live action	April 21, 2015
Karen Gaviola	"Hostile Takeover"	Supergirl	Supergirl by: Otto Binder; Al Plastino	Live action	December 14, 2015
Karen Gaviola	"Weaponizer"	Lucifer	Lucifer by: Neil Gaiman; Sam Kieth; Mike Dringenberg	Live action	October 24, 2016
Karen Gaviola	"Love Handles"	Lucifer	Lucifer by: Neil Gaiman; Sam Kieth; Mike Dringenberg	Live action	January 23, 2017
Karen Gaviola	"The Good, the Bad, and the Crispy"	Lucifer	Lucifer by: Neil Gaiman; Sam Kieth; Mike Dringenberg	Live action	May 29, 2017
Karen Gaviola	"They're Back, Aren't They?"	Lucifer	Lucifer by: Neil Gaiman; Sam Kieth; Mike Dringenberg	Live action	October 2, 2017
Karen Gaviola	"eXit strategy"	The Gifted	X-Men by: Stan Lee; Jack Kirby	Live action	October 23, 2017
Karen Gaviola	"Vegas with Some Radish"	Lucifer	Lucifer by: Neil Gaiman; Sam Kieth; Mike Dringenberg	Live action	November 6, 2017
Karen Gaviola	"A Chance at a Happy Ending"	Lucifer	Lucifer by: Neil Gaiman; Sam Kieth; Mike Dringenberg	Live action	May 28, 2021
Jennifer Getzinger	"A Little Song and Dance"	Agent Carter	Peggy Carter by Stan Lee; Jack Kirby	Live action	February 23, 2016
Jennifer Getzinger	"Hollywood Ending"	Agent Carter	Peggy Carter by Stan Lee; Jack Kirby	Live action	March 1, 2016
Jennifer Getzinger	"AKA I Want Your Cray Cray"	Jessica Jones	Jessica Jones by: Brian Michael Bendis; Michael Gaydos	Live action	March 8, 2018
Jennifer Getzinger	"No Good Deed"	Daredevil	Daredevil by: Stan Lee; Bill Everett	Live action	October 19, 2018
Jennifer Getzinger	"A.K.A. I Did Something Today"	Jessica Jones	Jessica Jones by: Brian Michael Bendis; Michael Gaydos	Live action	June 14, 2019
Jennifer Getzinger	"A.K.A. Hellcat"	Jessica Jones	Jessica Jones by: Brian Michael Bendis; Michael Gaydos	Live action	June 14, 2019
Rachel Goldberg	"Alignment Chart"	Cloak & Dagger	Cloak and Dagger by: Bill Mantlo; Ed Hannigan	Live action	April 25, 2019
Kathleen Good	"Big Roommates 2"; S1 E3	Big Hero 6: The Series	Big Hero 6 by Man of Action	Animated	June 9, 2018
Kathleen Good	"Food Fight"; S1 E5	Big Hero 6: The Series	Big Hero 6 by Man of Action	Animated	June 10, 2018
Kathleen Good	"Failure Mode"; S1 E7	Big Hero 6: The Series	Big Hero 6 by Man of Action	Animated	June 23, 2018
Kathleen Good	"The Impatient Patient"; S1 E9	Big Hero 6: The Series	Big Hero 6 by Man of Action	Animated	July 7, 2018
Kathleen Good	"Mr. Sparkles Loses His Sparkle"; S1 E10	Big Hero 6: The Series	Big Hero 6 by Man of Action	Animated	July 14, 2018
Kathleen Good	"Mini-Max"; S1 E16	Big Hero 6: The Series	Big Hero 6 by Man of Action	Animated	August 25, 2018
Neasa Hardiman	"The Gentleman's Name is Gorgon"	Inhumans	Inhumans by: Stan Lee; Jack Kirby	Live action	October 27, 2017
Neasa Hardiman	"AKA Pork Chop"	Jessica Jones	Jessica Jones by: Brian Michael Bendis; Michael Gaydos	Live action	March 8, 2018
Neasa Hardiman	"A.K.A. Everything"	Jessica Jones	Jessica Jones by: Brian Michael Bendis; Michael Gaydos	Live action	June 14, 2019
Mary Harron	"Quid Pro Quo"	Constantine	John Constantine by: Alan Moore; Steve Bissette; John Totleben	Live action	January 23, 2015
Linda-Lisa Hayter	"Death Moves Pretty Fast"; S5 E5	iZombie	iZombie by: Chris Roberson; Michael Allred	Live action	May 30, 2019
Kate Herron	"Glorious Purpose"	Loki	Loki by: Stan Lee; Larry Lieber; Jack Kirby	Live action	June 9, 2021
Kate Herron	"The Variant"	Loki	Loki by: Stan Lee; Larry Lieber; Jack Kirby	Live action	June 16, 2021
Kate Herron	"Lamentis"	Loki	Loki by: Stan Lee; Larry Lieber; Jack Kirby	Live action	June 23, 2021
Kate Herron	"The Nexus Event"	Loki	Loki by: Stan Lee; Larry Lieber; Jack Kirby	Live action	June 30, 2021
Kate Herron	"Journey into Mystery"	Loki	Loki by: Stan Lee; Larry Lieber; Jack Kirby	Live action	July 7, 2021
Kate Herron	"For All Time. Always."	Loki	Loki by: Stan Lee; Larry Lieber; Jack Kirby	Live action	July 14, 2021
Liz Holzman	Wired: Part 2 S2 E3	The Zeta Project	Zeta by: Dan Riba; Robert Goodman	Animated	April 6, 2002
Leigh Janiak	"The Damage Done"; S1 E7	Outcast	Outcast by: Robert Kirkman; Paul Azaceta	Live action	July 22, 2016
Rebecca Johnson	"We Can Be Heroes"	Supergirl	Supergirl by: Otto Binder; Al Plastino	Live action	January 30, 2017
Rebecca Johnson	"Memorabilia"	The Flash	Flash by: Robert Kanigher; Carmine Infantino	Live action	January 29, 2019

=== K-O ===
Director	Episode	Series	Based on	Type	U.S. release date
Nicole Kassell	"It's Summer and We're Running Out of Ice"	Watchmen	Watchmen by: Alan Moore; Dave Gibbons	Live action	October 20, 2019
Nicole Kassell	"Martial Feats of Comanche Horsemanship"	Watchmen	Watchmen by: Alan Moore; Dave Gibbons	Live action	October 27, 2019
Nicole Kassell	"A God Walks into Abar"	Watchmen	Watchmen by: Alan Moore; Dave Gibbons	Live action	December 8, 2019
Maggie Kiley	"Chapter Nineteen: Death Proof"	Riverdale	Archie Andrews by: John L. Goldwater; Bob Montana; Vic Bloom	Live action	November 15, 2017
Maggie Kiley	"Chapter Five: Dreams in a Witch House"	Chilling Adventures of Sabrina	Chilling Adventures of Sabrina by: Roberto Aguirre-Sacasa; Robert Hack	Live action	October 26, 2018
Maggie Kiley	"Chapter Eight: The Burial"	Chilling Adventures of Sabrina	Chilling Adventures of Sabrina by: Roberto Aguirre-Sacasa; Robert Hack	Live action	October 26, 2018
Maggie Kiley	"meMento"	The Gifted	X-Men by: Stan Lee; Jack Kirby	Live action	January 8, 2019
Maggie Kiley	"Chapter Forty-Five: The Stranger"	Riverdale	Archie Andrews by: John L. Goldwater; Bob Montana; Vic Bloom	Live action	January 23, 2019
Maggie Kiley	"Chapter Fifty-One: Big Fun"	Riverdale	Archie Andrews by: John L. Goldwater; Bob Montana; Vic Bloom	Live action	March 20, 2019
Maggie Kiley	"Chapter One: Once Upon a Time in New York"	Katy Keene	Katy Keene by Bill Woggon	Live action	February 6, 2020
Jennifer Kluska	"#TheLateBatsby"; S1 E1	DC Super Hero Girls	Wonder Woman by: William Moulton Marston; H. G. Peter	Animated	January 10, 2019
Shannon Kohli	"Blood Memory"	Supergirl	Supergirl by: Otto Binder; Al Plastino	Live action	January 27, 2019
Shannon Kohli	"Will the Real Miss Tessmacher Please Stand Up?"	Supergirl	Supergirl by: Otto Binder; Al Plastino	Live action	May 5, 2019
Larysa Kondracki	"Azrael"	Gotham	Gotham City by: Bill Finger; Bob Kane	Live action	May 2, 2016
Larysa Kondracki	"Chapter 4"	Legion	Legion by: Chris Claremont; Bill Sienkiewicz	Live action	March 1, 2017
Ellen Kuras	"Chapter 12"	Legion	Legion by: Chris Claremont; Bill Sienkiewicz	Live action	April 24, 2018
Ellen Kuras	"Man on the Moon"	The Umbrella Academy	The Umbrella Academy by Gerard Way and Gabriel Bá	Live action	February 15, 2019
Ellen Kuras	"Number Five"	The Umbrella Academy	The Umbrella Academy by Gerard Way and Gabriel Bá	Live action	February 15, 2019
Alexandra La Roche	"The Wrath of Savitar"	The Flash	Flash by: Robert Kanigher; Carmine Infantino	Live action	March 7, 2017
Alexandra La Roche	"Mixed Signals"	The Flash	Flash by: Robert Kanigher; Carmine Infantino	Live action	October 17, 2017
Alexandra La Roche	"The Elongated Knight Rises"	The Flash	Flash by: Robert Kanigher; Carmine Infantino	Live action	January 23, 2018
Alexandra La Roche	"Shifting Allegiances"	Arrow	Green Arrow by: Mort Weisinger; George Papp	Live action	April 26, 2018
Alexandra La Roche	"Of Two Minds"	Supergirl	Supergirl by: Otto Binder; Al Plastino	Live action	April 30, 2018
Alexandra La Roche	"Tagumo Attacks!!!"	Legends of Tomorrow	Firestorm by: Gerry Conway; Al Milgrom	Live action	November 19, 2018
Alexandra La Roche	"Unmasked"	Arrow	Green Arrow by: Mort Weisinger; George Papp	Live action	December 3, 2018
Alexandra La Roche	"Chapter Fifty-Four: Fear the Reaper"	Riverdale	Archie Andrews by: John L. Goldwater; Bob Montana; Vic Bloom	Live action	April 24, 2019
Alexandra La Roche	"Slay Anything"	Legends of Tomorrow	Firestorm by: Gerry Conway; Al Milgrom	Live action	February 11, 2020
Alexandra La Roche	"Romeo v Juliet: Dawn of Justness"	Legends of Tomorrow	Firestorm by: Gerry Conway; Al Milgrom	Live action	March 17, 2020
Mary Lambert	"The Sin-Eater"	Arrow	Green Arrow by: Mort Weisinger; George Papp	Live action	February 22, 2017
Mimi Leder	"The Wife's Tale"; S2 E2	Human Target	Human Target by: Len Wein; Carmine Infantino	Live action	November 24, 2010
Kasi Lemmons	"All Souled Out"	Luke Cage	Luke Cage by: Archie Goodwin; George Tuska; Roy Thomas; John Romita Sr.	Live action	June 22, 2018
Lucy Liu	"Soul Brother #1"	Luke Cage	Luke Cage by: Archie Goodwin; George Tuska; Roy Thomas; John Romita Sr.	Live action	June 22, 2018
Nina Lopez-Corrado	"Hot Potato Soup"	Agents of S.H.I.E.L.D.	S.H.I.E.L.D. by: Stan Lee; Jack Kirby	Live action	January 31, 2017
Nina Lopez-Corrado	"Abra Kadabra"	The Flash	Flash by: Robert Kanigher; Carmine Infantino	Live action	March 28, 2017
Nina Lopez-Corrado	"The Last Day"	Agents of S.H.I.E.L.D.	S.H.I.E.L.D. by: Stan Lee; Jack Kirby	Live action	January 19, 2018
Nina Lopez-Corrado	"The Devil Complex"	Agents of S.H.I.E.L.D.	S.H.I.E.L.D. by: Stan Lee; Jack Kirby	Live action	March 23, 2018
Caity Lotz	"Mortal Khanbat"	Legends of Tomorrow	Firestorm by: Gerry Conway; Al Milgrom	Live action	February 25, 2020
Jennifer Lynch	"AKA Three Lives and Counting"	Jessica Jones	Jessica Jones by: Brian Michael Bendis; Michael Gaydos	Live action	March 8, 2018
Jennifer Lynch	"All Roads Lead..."	Agents of S.H.I.E.L.D.	S.H.I.E.L.D. by: Stan Lee; Jack Kirby	Live action	April 20, 2018
Jennifer Lynch	"Revelations"	Daredevil	Daredevil by: Stan Lee; Bill Everett	Live action	October 19, 2018
Allison Mack	"Power"	Smallville	Superman by: Jerry Siegel; Joe Shuster	Live action	January 29, 2009
Allison Mack	"Warrior"	Smallville	Superman by: Jerry Siegel; Joe Shuster	Live action	February 12, 2010
Gail Mancuso	"The True Adventures of Rudy Kazootie"	Sabrina the Teenage Witch	Sabrina the Teenage Witch by Dan DeCarlo; George Gladir	Live action	October 11, 1996
Gail Mancuso	"Dream Date"; S1 E6	Sabrina the Teenage Witch	Sabrina the Teenage Witch by Dan DeCarlo; George Gladir	Live action	November 1, 1996
Gail Mancuso	"Dummy for Love"; S2 E3	Sabrina the Teenage Witch	Sabrina the Teenage Witch by Dan DeCarlo; George Gladir	Live action	October 3, 1997
Ami Canaan Mann	"Call/Response"	Cloak & Dagger	Cloak and Dagger by: Bill Mantlo; Ed Hannigan	Live action	June 21, 2018
Ami Canaan Mann	"Bury Another"	Runaways	Runaways by: Brian K. Vaughan; Adrian Alphona	Live action	December 21, 2018
Ami Canaan Mann	"The Clampdown"; S1 E8	Deadly Class	Deadly Class by: Rick Remender; Wesley Craig	Live action	March 6, 2019
Ami Canaan Mann	"Blue Note"	Cloak & Dagger	Cloak and Dagger by: Bill Mantlo; Ed Hannigan	Live action	May 23, 2019
Anna Mastro	"Past Life"	Runaways	Runaways by: Brian K. Vaughan; Adrian Alphona	Live action	December 21, 2018
Daisy von Scherler Mayer	"Mercy"; S2 E8	Outcast	Outcast by: Robert Kirkman; Paul Azaceta	Live action	May 22, 2017
Tawnia McKiernan	"Luthors"	Supergirl	Supergirl by: Otto Binder; Al Plastino	Live action	February 13, 2017
Tawnia McKiernan	"For Good"	Supergirl	Supergirl by: Otto Binder; Al Plastino	Live action	January 29, 2018
Tawnia McKiernan	"The Book of Little Black Lies"	Black Lightning	Black Lightning by: Tony Isabella; Trevor Von Eeden	Live action	March 20, 2018
Tawnia McKiernan	"The Book of Rebellion: Chapter One: Exodus"	Black Lightning	Black Lightning by: Tony Isabella; Trevor Von Eeden	Live action	December 4, 2018
Tawnia McKiernan	"Chapter Forty-Eight: Requiem for a Welterweight"	Riverdale	Archie Andrews by: John L. Goldwater; Bob Montana; Vic Bloom	Live action	February 27, 2019
Tawnia McKiernan	"O Brother, Where Art Thou?"	Supergirl	Supergirl by: Otto Binder; Al Plastino	Live action	March 17, 2019
Meera Menon	"Together"	Titans	Teen Titans by: Bob Haney; Bruno Premiani	Live action	November 9, 2018
Meera Menon	"The Abyss"	The Punisher	Punisher by: Gerry Conway; John Romita Sr.; Ross Andru	Live action	January 18, 2019
Tara Miele	"The Ties That Bind"	Arrow	Green Arrow by: Mort Weisinger; George Papp	Live action	May 10, 2018
Tara Miele	"Confessions"	Arrow	Green Arrow by: Mort Weisinger; George Papp	Live action	April 29, 2019
Martha Mitchell	"Alternate World"; S1 E6	Timecop	Timecop by: Mike Richardson; Mark Verheiden	Live action	June 20, 1998
Lauren Montgomery	"Timber Wolf"; S1 E2	Legion of Super Heroes	Legion of Super-Heroes by: Otto Binder; Al Plastino	Animated	September 30, 2006
Lauren Montgomery	"Champions"; S1 E5	Legion of Super Heroes	Legion of Super-Heroes by: Otto Binder; Al Plastino	Animated	November 11, 2006
Lauren Montgomery	"Lightning Storm"; S1 E8	Legion of Super Heroes	Legion of Super-Heroes by: Otto Binder; Al Plastino	Animated	February 10, 2007
Lauren Montgomery	"Chain of Command"; S1 E11	Legion of Super Heroes	Legion of Super-Heroes by: Otto Binder; Al Plastino	Animated	March 3, 2007
Lauren Montgomery	"Mitefall!"	Batman: The Brave and the Bold	Batman by: Bill Finger; Bob Kane	Animated	November 18, 2011
Lauren Montgomery	"Auld Acquaintance"; S1 E26	Young Justice	Robin by: Bill Finger; Bob Kane; Jerry Robinson	Animated	April 21, 2012
April Mullen	"Necromancing the Stone"	Legends of Tomorrow	Firestorm by: Gerry Conway; Al Milgrom	Live action	March 19, 2018
Ruba Nadda	"Training Day"	Arrow	Green Arrow by: Mort Weisinger; George Papp	Live action	March 11, 2019
Jennifer Yuh Nelson	"Home, Bitter Home"; S2 E1	Todd McFarlane's Spawn	Spawn by Todd McFarlane	Animated	May 15, 1998
Jennifer Yuh Nelson	"Send in the KKKlowns"; S2 E4	Todd McFarlane's Spawn	Spawn by Todd McFarlane	Animated	June 5, 1998
Jennifer Yuh Nelson	"The Mindkiller"; S3 E1	Todd McFarlane's Spawn	Spawn by Todd McFarlane	Animated	May 23, 1999
Jennifer Yuh Nelson	"Hunter's Moon"; S3 E4	Todd McFarlane's Spawn	Spawn by Todd McFarlane	Animated	May 26, 1999
Cherie Nowlan	"Outlaw Country"	Legends of Tomorrow	Firestorm by: Gerry Conway; Al Milgrom	Live action	November 17, 2016
Cherie Nowlan	"Chapter Thirty-Four: Judgment Night"	Riverdale	Archie Andrews by: John L. Goldwater; Bob Montana; Vic Bloom	Live action	May 9, 2018
Alexis Ostrander	"Chapter Thirty: The Noose Tightens"	Riverdale	Archie Andrews by: John L. Goldwater; Bob Montana; Vic Bloom	Live action	March 28, 2018
Alexis Ostrander	"Mirror People"; S1 E4	Deadly Class	Deadly Class by: Rick Remender; Wesley Craig	Live action	February 6, 2019
Alexis Ostrander	"What's So Funny About Truth, Justice, and the American Way?"	Supergirl	Supergirl by: Otto Binder; Al Plastino	Live action	March 3, 2019
Alexis Ostrander	"Red Dawn"	Supergirl	Supergirl by: Otto Binder; Al Plastino	Live action	May 12, 2019

=== P-T ===
Director	Episode	Series	Based on	Type	U.S. release date
Marianna Palka	"19 Hours and 13 Minutes"; S2 E5	Happy!	HAPPY! by: Grant Morrison; Darick Robertson	Live action	April 24, 2019
Marianna Palka	"Pervapalooza"; S2 E6	Happy!	HAPPY! by: Grant Morrison; Darick Robertson	Live action	May 1, 2019
Caitlin Parrish	"Trinity"	Supergirl	Supergirl by: Otto Binder; Al Plastino	Live action	May 7, 2018
Sue Perrotto	"Phineas and Ferb: Mission Marvel"	Phineas and Ferb	Avengers by: Stan Lee; Jack Kirby	Animated	August 16, 2013
Jennifer Phang	"Chapter Thirty-Two: Prisoners"	Riverdale	Archie Andrews by: John L. Goldwater; Bob Montana; Vic Bloom	Live action	April 25, 2018
Jennifer Phang	"Funhouse Mirrors"	Cloak & Dagger	Cloak and Dagger by: Bill Mantlo; Ed Hannigan	Live action	July 5, 2018
Jennifer Phang	"Restless Energy"	Cloak & Dagger	Cloak and Dagger by: Bill Mantlo; Ed Hannigan	Live action	April 4, 2019
Julie Plec	"Chapter Twenty-Six: The Tell-Tale Heart"	Riverdale	Archie Andrews by: John L. Goldwater; Bob Montana; Vic Bloom	Live action	February 7, 2018
Ellen S. Pressman	"Chapter Eighteen: When a Stranger Calls"	Riverdale	Archie Andrews by: John L. Goldwater; Bob Montana; Vic Bloom	Live action	November 8, 2017
Patia Prouty	"Inheritance"	Arrow	Green Arrow by: Mort Weisinger; George Papp	Live action	March 25, 2019
Noëlle Raffaele	"#SweetJustice"; S1 E4	DC Super Hero Girls	Wonder Woman by: William Moulton Marston; H. G. Peter	Animated	March 8, 2019
Noëlle Raffaele	"#MeetTheCheetah"; S1 E8	DC Super Hero Girls	Wonder Woman by: William Moulton Marston; H. G. Peter	Animated	April 7, 2019
Noëlle Raffaele	"#Beeline"; S1 E9	DC Super Hero Girls	Wonder Woman by: William Moulton Marston; H. G. Peter	Animated	May 12, 2019
Noëlle Raffaele	"#SuperWho?"; S1 E10	DC Super Hero Girls	Wonder Woman by: William Moulton Marston; H. G. Peter	Animated	May 19, 2019
Noëlle Raffaele	"#ShockItToMe"; S1 E11	DC Super Hero Girls	Wonder Woman by: William Moulton Marston; H. G. Peter	Animated	May 26, 2019
Erin Richards	"The Trial of Jim Gordon"	Gotham	Gotham City by: Bill Finger; Bob Kane	Live action	March 7, 2019
Salli Richardson	"Inside Voices"	Agents of S.H.I.E.L.D.	S.H.I.E.L.D. by: Stan Lee; Jack Kirby	Live action	April 6, 2018
Salli Richardson	"I Get Physical"	Luke Cage	Luke Cage by: Archie Goodwin; George Tuska; Roy Thomas; John Romita Sr.	Live action	June 22, 2018
Salli Richardson	"The Book of Consequences: Chapter Four: Translucent Freak"	Black Lightning	Black Lightning by: Tony Isabella; Trevor Von Eeden	Live action	October 30, 2018
Salli Richardson	"Flustercluck"	The Punisher	Punisher by: Gerry Conway; John Romita Sr.; Ross Andru	Live action	January 18, 2019
Salli Richardson	"Chapter Fourteen: Lupercalia"	Chilling Adventures of Sabrina	Chilling Adventures of Sabrina by: Roberto Aguirre-Sacasa; Robert Hack	Live action	April 5, 2019
Salli Richardson	"Hair Patrol"	Doom Patrol	Doom Patrol by: Arnold Drake; Bob Haney; Bruno Premiani	Live action	April 19, 2019
Krysten Ritter	"A.K.A. You're Welcome"	Jessica Jones	Jessica Jones by: Brian Michael Bendis; Michael Gaydos	Live action	June 14, 2019
Rebecca Rodriguez	"Penultimate Patrol"	Doom Patrol	Doom Patrol by: Arnold Drake; Bob Haney; Bruno Premiani	Live action	May 17, 2019
Rosemary Rodriguez	"AKA 1,000 Cuts"	Jessica Jones	Jessica Jones by: Brian Michael Bendis; Michael Gaydos	Live action	November 20, 2015
Rosemary Rodriguez	"Risky Bismuth"; S1 E10	The Tick	The Tick by Ben Edlund	Live action	February 23, 2018
Rosemary Rodriguez	"AKA Shark in the Bathtub, Monster in the Bed"	Jessica Jones	Jessica Jones by: Brian Michael Bendis; Michael Gaydos	Live action	March 8, 2018
Pamela Romanowsky	"Chapter Forty: The Great Escape"	Riverdale	Archie Andrews by: John L. Goldwater; Bob Montana; Vic Bloom	Live action	November 14, 2018
Pamela Romanowsky	"Chapter Fifty-Two: The Raid"	Riverdale	Archie Andrews by: John L. Goldwater; Bob Montana; Vic Bloom	Live action	March 27, 2019
Pamela Romanowsky	"Chapter Four: Here Comes the Sun"	Katy Keene	Katy Keene by Bill Woggon	Live action	February 27, 2020
Bethany Rooney	"State v. Queen"	Arrow	Green Arrow by: Mort Weisinger; George Papp	Live action	November 20, 2013
Lee Rose	"The Bank Job"; S1 E9	XIII: The Series	XIII by: Jean Van Hamme; William Vance	Live action	September 7, 2012
Lee Rose	"Chapter Nine: La Grande Illusion"	Riverdale	Archie Andrews by: John L. Goldwater; Bob Montana; Vic Bloom	Live action	April 6, 2017
Amanda Row	"Rabbit Hold"	Cloak & Dagger	Cloak and Dagger by: Bill Mantlo; Ed Hannigan	Live action	April 18, 2019
Lorraine Senna	"That Old Gang of Mine"; S2 E7	Lois & Clark: The New Adventures of Superman	Superman by: Jerry Siegel; Joe Shuster	Live action	November 13, 1994
Millicent Shelton	"The Flash Is Born"	The Flash	Flash by: Robert Kanigher; Carmine Infantino	Live action	November 18, 2014
Millicent Shelton	"Welcome to Earth-2"	The Flash	Flash by: Robert Kanigher; Carmine Infantino	Live action	February 9, 2016
Millicent Shelton	"Borrowing Problems from the Future"	The Flash	Flash by: Robert Kanigher; Carmine Infantino	Live action	January 24, 2017
Millicent Shelton	"Resist"	Supergirl	Supergirl by: Otto Binder; Al Plastino	Live action	May 15, 2017
Millicent Shelton	"Tsunami"	Runaways	Runaways by: Brian K. Vaughan; Adrian Alphona	Live action	December 26, 2017
Millicent Shelton	"AKA The Octopus"	Jessica Jones	Jessica Jones by: Brian Michael Bendis; Michael Gaydos	Live action	March 8, 2018
Millicent Shelton	"The Basement"	Luke Cage	Luke Cage by: Archie Goodwin; George Tuska; Roy Thomas; John Romita Sr.	Live action	June 22, 2018
Millicent Shelton	The Coffin"	Preacher	Preacher by: Garth Ennis; Steve Dillon	Live action	July 22, 2018
Patty Shinagawa	"Hulk Talk Smack!"; S1 E4	The Super Hero Squad Show	Avengers by: Stan Lee; Jack Kirby	Animated	October 3, 2009
Patty Shinagawa	"Enter Dormammu!"; S1 E5	The Super Hero Squad Show	Avengers by: Stan Lee; Jack Kirby	Animated	October 10, 2009
Patty Shinagawa	"From the Atom... It Rises!"; S1 E7	The Super Hero Squad Show	Avengers by: Stan Lee; Jack Kirby	Animated	October 20, 2009
Patty Shinagawa	"This Forest Green!"; S1 E9	The Super Hero Squad Show	Avengers by: Stan Lee; Jack Kirby	Animated	October 22, 2009
Patty Shinagawa	"If This Be My Thanos!"; S1 E11	The Super Hero Squad Show	Avengers by: Stan Lee; Jack Kirby	Animated	October 24, 2009
Patty Shinagawa	"Tremble at the Might of... M.O.D.O.K.!"; S1 E13	The Super Hero Squad Show	Avengers by: Stan Lee; Jack Kirby	Animated	November 7, 2009
Patty Shinagawa	"Invader From the Dark Dimension!"; S1 E15	The Super Hero Squad Show	Avengers by: Stan Lee; Jack Kirby	Animated	November 21, 2009
Patty Shinagawa	"Stranger From a Savage Land!"; S1 E17	The Super Hero Squad Show	Avengers by: Stan Lee; Jack Kirby	Animated	December 12, 2009
Patty Shinagawa	"Election of Evil!"; S1 E19	The Super Hero Squad Show	Avengers by: Stan Lee; Jack Kirby	Animated	December 26, 2009
Patty Shinagawa	"The Ice Melt Cometh!"; S1 E22	The Super Hero Squad Show	Avengers by: Stan Lee; Jack Kirby	Animated	January 23, 2010
Patty Shinagawa	"Mother of Doom!"; S1 E24	The Super Hero Squad Show	Avengers by: Stan Lee; Jack Kirby	Animated	February 6, 2010
Patty Shinagawa	"This Al Dente Earth!"; S1 E26	The Super Hero Squad Show	Avengers by: Stan Lee; Jack Kirby	Animated	February 20, 2010
Patty Shinagawa	"Another Order of Evil, Part 2!"; S2 E2	The Super Hero Squad Show	Avengers by: Stan Lee; Jack Kirby	Animated	October 23, 2010
Patty Shinagawa	"Villainy Redux Syndrome!"; S2 E4	The Super Hero Squad Show	Avengers by: Stan Lee; Jack Kirby	Animated	November 6, 2010
Patty Shinagawa	"Support Your Local Sky-Father!"; S2 E5	The Super Hero Squad Show	Avengers by: Stan Lee; Jack Kirby	Animated	November 13, 2010
Patty Shinagawa	"Double Negation at the World's End!"; S2 E7	The Super Hero Squad Show	Avengers by: Stan Lee; Jack Kirby	Animated	November 27, 2010
Patty Shinagawa	"Lo, How the Mighty Hath Abdicated!"; S2 E10	The Super Hero Squad Show	Avengers by: Stan Lee; Jack Kirby	Animated	January 22, 2011
Patty Shinagawa	"Too Many Wolverines!"; S2 E12	The Super Hero Squad Show	Avengers by: Stan Lee; Jack Kirby	Animated	February 5, 2011
Patty Shinagawa	"Pedicure and Facial of Doom!"; S2 E13	The Super Hero Squad Show	Avengers by: Stan Lee; Jack Kirby	Animated	February 12, 2011
Patty Shinagawa	"The Ballad of Beta Ray Bill! (Six Against Infinity, Part 1)"; S2 E15	The Super Hero Squad Show	Avengers by: Stan Lee; Jack Kirby	Animated	July 23, 2011
Patty Shinagawa	"This Man-Thing, This Monster! (Six Against Infinity, Part 3)"; S2 E17	The Super Hero Squad Show	Avengers by: Stan Lee; Jack Kirby	Animated	October 3, 2011
Patty Shinagawa	"Planet Hulk! (Six Against Infinity, Part 5)"; S2 E19	The Super Hero Squad Show	Avengers by: Stan Lee; Jack Kirby	Animated	October 5, 2011
Patty Shinagawa	"Brouhaha at the World's Bottom!"; S2 E21	The Super Hero Squad Show	Avengers by: Stan Lee; Jack Kirby	Animated	October 7, 2011
Patty Shinagawa	"Revenge of the Baby Sat!"; S2 E23	The Super Hero Squad Show	Avengers by: Stan Lee; Jack Kirby	Animated	October 11, 2011
Patty Shinagawa	"When Strikes the Surfer!"; S2 E25	The Super Hero Squad Show	Avengers by: Stan Lee; Jack Kirby	Animated	October 13, 2011
Floria Sigismondi	"Kinbaku"	Daredevil	Daredevil by: Stan Lee; Bill Everett	Live action	March 18, 2016
Kari Skogland	"The Soul Can't Rest"; S1 E1	The Crow: Stairway to Heaven	The Crow by James O'Barr	Live action	September 25, 1998
Kari Skogland	"Souled Out"; S1 E2	The Crow: Stairway to Heaven	The Crow by James O'Barr	Live action	October 2, 1998
Kari Skogland	"Resupply"	The Punisher	Punisher by: Gerry Conway; John Romita Sr.; Ross Andru	Live action	November 17, 2017
Kari Skogland	"New World Order"	The Falcon and the Winter Soldier	Falcon by: Stan Lee; Gene Colan; Bucky Barnes by: Ed Brubaker; Steve Epting	Live action	March 19, 2021
Kari Skogland	"The Star-Spangled Man"	The Falcon and the Winter Soldier	Falcon by: Stan Lee; Gene Colan; Bucky Barnes by: Ed Brubaker; Steve Epting	Live action	March 26, 2021
Kari Skogland	"Power Broker"	The Falcon and the Winter Soldier	Falcon by: Stan Lee; Gene Colan; Bucky Barnes by: Ed Brubaker; Steve Epting	Live action	April 2, 2021
Kari Skogland	"The Whole World Is Watching"	The Falcon and the Winter Soldier	Falcon by: Stan Lee; Gene Colan; Bucky Barnes by: Ed Brubaker; Steve Epting	Live action	April 9, 2021
Kari Skogland	"Truth"	The Falcon and the Winter Soldier	Falcon by: Stan Lee; Gene Colan; Bucky Barnes by: Ed Brubaker; Steve Epting	Live action	April 16, 2021
Kari Skogland	"One World, One People"	The Falcon and the Winter Soldier	Falcon by: Stan Lee; Gene Colan; Bucky Barnes by: Ed Brubaker; Steve Epting	Live action	April 23, 2021
Sarah Adina Smith	"Chapter 11"	Legion	Legion by: Chris Claremont; Bill Sienkiewicz	Live action	April 17, 2018
Jane Wu Soriano	"The Inside Scoop"; S1 E3	Big Guy and Rusty the Boy Robot	The Big Guy and Rusty the Boy Robot by: Frank Miller; Geof Darrow	Animated	October 2, 1999
Jane Wu Soriano	"The Worm-Guy Guy Syndrome"; S3 E1	Men in Black: The Series	The Men in Black by Lowell Cunningham	Animated	October 2, 1999
Jane Wu Soriano	"The "J" is for James Syndrome"; S3 E14	Men in Black: The Series	The Men in Black by Lowell Cunningham	Animated	May 20, 2000
Wendey Stanzler	"Vertigo"	Arrow	Green Arrow by: Mort Weisinger; George Papp	Live action	January 30, 2013
Wendey Stanzler	"League of Assassins"	Arrow	Green Arrow by: Mort Weisinger; George Papp	Live action	November 6, 2013
Wendey Stanzler	"Heir to the Demon"	Arrow	Green Arrow by: Mort Weisinger; George Papp	Live action	November 6, 2013
Wendey Stanzler	"Sara"	Arrow	Green Arrow by: Mort Weisinger; George Papp	Live action	October 15, 2014
Wendey Stanzler	"Who Is Harrison Wells?"	The Flash	Flash by: Robert Kanigher; Carmine Infantino	Live action	April 21, 2015
Wendey Stanzler	"This Is Your Sword"	Arrow	Green Arrow by: Mort Weisinger; George Papp	Live action	May 6, 2015
Wendey Stanzler	"Restoration"	Arrow	Green Arrow by: Mort Weisinger; George Papp	Live action	October 21, 2015
Wendey Stanzler	"Paradise Lost"	Agents of S.H.I.E.L.D.	S.H.I.E.L.D. by: Stan Lee; Jack Kirby	Live action	April 12, 2016
Wendey Stanzler	"Failed Experiments"	Agents of S.H.I.E.L.D.	S.H.I.E.L.D. by: Stan Lee; Jack Kirby	Live action	May 3, 2016
Wendey Stanzler	"The Man Behind the Shield"	Agents of S.H.I.E.L.D.	S.H.I.E.L.D. by: Stan Lee; Jack Kirby	Live action	February 14, 2017
Wendey Stanzler	"Underneath"	Arrow	Green Arrow by: Mort Weisinger; George Papp	Live action	May 3, 2017
Wendey Stanzler	"We Fall"	Arrow	Green Arrow by: Mort Weisinger; George Papp	Live action	January 25, 2018
Wendey Stanzler	"Big Shot"	Runaways	Runaways by: Brian K. Vaughan; Adrian Alphona	Live action	December 21, 2018
Rachel Talalay	"Breakout"; S2 E7	XIII: The Series	XIII by: Jean Van Hamme; William Vance	Live action	October 29, 2012
Rachel Talalay	"Mousetrap"; S2 E8	XIII: The Series	XIII by: Jean Van Hamme; William Vance	Live action	November 5, 2012
Rachel Talalay	"Fast Lane"	The Flash	Flash by: Robert Kanigher; Carmine Infantino	Live action	February 2, 2016
Rachel Talalay	"Last Refuge"	Legends of Tomorrow	Firestorm by: Gerry Conway; Al Milgrom	Live action	April 21, 2016
Rachel Talalay	"Welcome to Earth"	Supergirl	Supergirl by: Otto Binder; Al Plastino	Live action	October 24, 2016
Rachel Talalay	"The Present"	The Flash	Flash by: Robert Kanigher; Carmine Infantino	Live action	December 6, 2016
Rachel Talalay	"Chapter Twenty-Five: The Wicked and the Divine"	Riverdale	Archie Andrews by: John L. Goldwater; Bob Montana; Vic Bloom	Live action	January 31, 2018
Rachel Talalay	"Fury Rogue"	The Flash	Flash by: Robert Kanigher; Carmine Infantino	Live action	April 24, 2018
Rachel Talalay	"The City's Not for Burning"	Iron Fist	Iron Fist by: Roy Thomas; Gil Kane	Live action	September 7, 2018
Rachel Talalay	"Chapter Six: An Exorcism in Greendale"	Chilling Adventures of Sabrina	Chilling Adventures of Sabrina by: Roberto Aguirre-Sacasa; Robert Hack	Live action	October 26, 2018
Rachel Talalay	"Chapter Forty-One: Manhunter"	Riverdale	Archie Andrews by: John L. Goldwater; Bob Montana; Vic Bloom	Live action	November 28, 2018
Rachel Talalay	"Suspicious Minds"	Supergirl	Supergirl by: Otto Binder; Al Plastino	Live action	January 20, 2019
Rachel Talalay	"Cause and XS"	The Flash	Flash by: Robert Kanigher; Carmine Infantino	Live action	February 12, 2019
Rachel Talalay	"Puppet Patrol"	Doom Patrol	Doom Patrol by: Arnold Drake; Bob Haney; Bruno Premiani	Live action	March 1, 2019
Rachel Talalay	"Chapter Fifty-Seven: Survive the Night"	Riverdale	Archie Andrews by: John L. Goldwater; Bob Montana; Vic Bloom	Live action	May 15, 2019
Amanda Tapping	"Episode Four"; S1 E4	Dark Matter	Dark Matter by: Joseph Mallozzi; Paul Mullie	Live action	July 3, 2015
Amanda Tapping	"Welcome to Your New Home"; S2 E1	Dark Matter	Dark Matter by: Joseph Mallozzi; Paul Mullie	Live action	July 1, 2016
Lucy Tcherniak	"Episode 5"; S1 E5	The End of the F***ing World	The End of the F***ing World by Charles Forsman	Live action	October 24, 2017
Lucy Tcherniak	"Episode 6"; S1 E6	The End of the F***ing World	The End of the F***ing World by Charles Forsman	Live action	October 24, 2017
Lucy Tcherniak	"Episode 7"; S1 E7	The End of the F***ing World	The End of the F***ing World by Charles Forsman	Live action	October 24, 2017
Lucy Tcherniak	"Episode 8"; S1 E8	The End of the F***ing World	The End of the F***ing World by Charles Forsman	Live action	October 24, 2017
Liesl Tommy	"A.K.A. Customer Service is Standing By"	Jessica Jones	Jessica Jones by: Brian Michael Bendis; Michael Gaydos	Live action	June 14, 2019
Monica Tomova	"The Piggy Bank Caper"; S1 E6b	The Rocketeer	Rocketeer by Dave Stevens	Animated	December 13, 2019
Rose Troche	"And Then the Devil Brought the Plague: The Book of Green Light"	Black Lightning	Black Lightning by: Tony Isabella; Trevor Von Eeden	Live action	February 13, 2018
Rose Troche	"The Book of Consequences: Chapter Three: Master Lowry"	Black Lightning	Black Lightning by: Tony Isabella; Trevor Von Eeden	Live action	October 23, 2018
Alice Troughton	"Flash Back"	The Flash	Flash by: Robert Kanigher; Carmine Infantino	Live action	March 29, 2016
Alice Troughton	"River of Time"	Legends of Tomorrow	Firestorm by: Gerry Conway; Al Milgrom	Live action	May 5, 2016
Alice Troughton	"Turncoat"	Legends of Tomorrow	Firestorm by: Gerry Conway; Al Milgrom	Live action	February 7, 2017

=== U-Z ===
Director	Episode	Series	Based on	Type	U.S. release date
Dearbhla Walsh	"Gunner"	The Punisher	Punisher by: Gerry Conway; John Romita Sr.; Ross Andru	Live action	November 17, 2017
Lynn Wang	"Movie Night"; S4 E11	Teen Titans Go!	Teen Titans by: Bob Haney; Bruno Premiani	Animated	February 10, 2017
Erica Weiss	"Trinity"	Supergirl	Supergirl by: Otto Binder; Al Plastino	Live action	May 7, 2018
Jude Weng	"Insane in the Germ Brain"; S4 E11	iZombie	iZombie by: Chris Roberson; Michael Allred	Live action	May 14, 2018
Jude Weng	"Killer Queen"; S5 E11	iZombie	iZombie by: Chris Roberson; Michael Allred	Live action	July 18, 2019
Tara Nicole Weyr	"Pops"	Lucifer	Lucifer by: Neil Gaiman; Sam Kieth; Mike Dringenberg	Live action	March 28, 2016
Tara Nicole Weyr	"My Little Monkey"	Lucifer	Lucifer by: Neil Gaiman; Sam Kieth; Mike Dringenberg	Live action	November 7, 2016
Tara Nicole Weyr	"Mr. & Mrs. Mazikeen Smith"	Lucifer	Lucifer by: Neil Gaiman; Sam Kieth; Mike Dringenberg	Live action	October 16, 2017
Tara Nicole Weyr	"All About Her"	Lucifer	Lucifer by: Neil Gaiman; Sam Kieth; Mike Dringenberg	Live action	January 22, 2018
Tara Nicole Weyr	"True Colors"	The Flash	Flash by: Robert Kanigher; Carmine Infantino	Live action	February 6, 2018
Tara Nicole Weyr	"The Angel of San Bernardino"	Lucifer	Lucifer by: Neil Gaiman; Sam Kieth; Mike Dringenberg	Live action	April 16, 2018
Dawn Wilkinson	"Chapter Ten: The Lost Weekend"	Riverdale	Archie Andrews by: John L. Goldwater; Bob Montana; Vic Bloom	Live action	April 13, 2017
Dawn Wilkinson	"Chapter Twenty: Tales from the Darkside"	Riverdale	Archie Andrews by: John L. Goldwater; Bob Montana; Vic Bloom	Live action	November 29, 2017
Dawn Wilkinson	"Chapter Thirty-Nine: The Midnight Club"	Riverdale	Archie Andrews by: John L. Goldwater; Bob Montana; Vic Bloom	Live action	November 7, 2018
Dawn Wilkinson	"Dissection"; S1 E7	Locke & Key	Locke & Key by Joe Hill	Live action	February 7, 2020
Dawn Wilkinson	"Ray of F**king Sunshine"; S1 E8	Locke & Key	Locke & Key by Joe Hill	Live action	February 7, 2020
Kristin Windell	"Spectre of the Gun"	Arrow	Green Arrow by: Mort Weisinger; George Papp	Live action	February 15, 2017
Kristin Windell	"Doppelganger"	Arrow	Green Arrow by: Mort Weisinger; George Papp	Live action	February 15, 2017
Kristin Windell	"Dancing Queen"	Legends of Tomorrow	Firestorm by: Gerry Conway; Al Milgrom	Live action	November 5, 2018
Kristin Windell	"Due Process"	Arrow	Green Arrow by: Mort Weisinger; George Papp	Live action	November 19, 2018
Kristin Windell	"Lost Canary"	Arrow	Green Arrow by: Mort Weisinger; George Papp	Live action	April 15, 2019
Lauren Wolkstein	"B Sides"	Cloak & Dagger	Cloak and Dagger by: Bill Mantlo; Ed Hannigan	Live action	May 2, 2019
Kate Woods	"Closure"	Agents of S.H.I.E.L.D.	S.H.I.E.L.D. by: Stan Lee; Jack Kirby	Live action	December 1, 2015
Kate Woods	"Lockup"	Agents of S.H.I.E.L.D.	S.H.I.E.L.D. by: Stan Lee; Jack Kirby	Live action	October 25, 2016
Kate Woods	"All the Comforts of Home"	Agents of S.H.I.E.L.D.	S.H.I.E.L.D. by: Stan Lee; Jack Kirby	Live action	March 2, 2018
Claudia Yarmy	"Candy Morningstar"	Lucifer	Lucifer by: Neil Gaiman; Sam Kieth; Mike Dringenberg	Live action	May 1, 2017
Claudia Yarmy	"My Brother's Keeper"	Lucifer	Lucifer by: Neil Gaiman; Sam Kieth; Mike Dringenberg	Live action	February 5, 2018
Claudia Yarmy	"Quintessential Deckerstar"	Lucifer	Lucifer by: Neil Gaiman; Sam Kieth; Mike Dringenberg	Live action	May 7, 2018
Claudia Yarmy	"Super Bad Boyfriend"	Lucifer	Lucifer by: Neil Gaiman; Sam Kieth; Mike Dringenberg	Live action	May 8, 2019
Claudia Yarmy	"¡Diablo!"	Lucifer	Lucifer by: Neil Gaiman; Sam Kieth; Mike Dringenberg	Live action	August 21, 2020
Ry Russo-Young	"Princeton Offense"	Cloak & Dagger	Cloak and Dagger by: Bill Mantlo; Ed Hannigan	Live action	June 28, 2018

== See also ==
- List of comic-based films directed by women
