= Episode Two (Dark Matter) =

- Dark Matter episode
- Episode no.: Season 1 Episode 2
- Directed by: TJ Scott
- Written by: Joseph Mallozzi
- Original air date: June 19, 2015

Guest appearances
- Torri Higginson as Commander Delaney Truffault; Amanda Brugel as Keeley; Kerr Hewitt as Sgt. Voss; Alex Courey as Miner Tomas; David Richmond-Peck as Commander of FCS Deliverance

Episode chronology
← Previous "Episode One"	Next → "Episode Three"

"Episode Two" is the second episode of the Space channel's science fiction series Dark Matter.

The episode was written by series creator and executive producer Joseph Mallozzi, and directed by TJ Scott. The episode first aired in Canada on June 19, 2015.

== Plot ==
In the opening scene, stunned by the revelations about their real identities, the crew discuss their next move. Three tells the group that he's concerned about how Ferrous Corp may react should they not complete the job they were hired for. One tells him that he's no murderer, to which Three responds that the screen says otherwise. Four says that they have left these memories behind and that if they are no longer part of them then they don't matter. The Android asks Two if she would like to continue the data recovery, calling her "Portia". She tells her to call her "Two" instead.

Meanwhile the Android bonds with Five, who wonders how she became a part of the crew and how she came to be aboard the Raza, as there is no Most Wanted file for her with the others' and her name and identity remain a mystery. She wants to feel like she belongs. The Android tells her that someday she may be fortunate not to be counted as part of this crew.

In conversation with Two, One realizes that their original selves must have killed Hrothgar's people and stolen their cargo, therefore no one else is coming to help the mining colony; he wants the Raza crew to stand with the miners to make up for their past crimes. Two tells him that he could spend the rest of his life doing good deeds and never make up for them, and to stick to the plan they agreed on earlier.

One, Three, Four and Six deliver half the weapons to the miners on the planet. One makes it clear to the group that he wants to help them. On the Raza's bridge, Two and Five see a Ferrous Corp destroyer called the Deliverance drop out of FTL and send a shuttle to the planet. Before replying to Deliverance's signal, Two attempts to warn the Marauder, but no one is aboard; they are all celebrating with the miners. When Two hails Deliverance, they demand to know why the crew haven't completed the job they were hired for and tell her that they're sending a shuttle over to the Raza to discuss the situation.

On the planet, One unsuccessfully negotiates with the leader of the Ferrous Corp soldiers, who calls him by his real name, Jace Corso. The leader pretends to agree to give them more time, then draws on One and is decapitated by Four with his katana. The Raza party and the miners are forced to open fire on the Ferrous troops. When the battle is over, Three and Six tell the miners they're leaving, to their dismay. One voices his concern for the miners' safety if the crew depart. He then offers to take any of the miners who wish to leave back with them to the Raza, but they wish to stay and defend their homes.

On the Raza, Two tells Five to go hide before she meets with the Ferrous Corp representative, Commander Nieman. He informs Two of the situation on the planet, and offers to forgive the advance payment for the Raza's uncompleted assignment, provided that Two abandons her crew on the planet and leaves orbit.

On the planet, Six is about to take off when he sees that the Raza is gone. The crew return to the settlement to give their support to the miners. Four questions a captured soldier and learns that they're planning to target the mining facility's reactor, which will level the facility and kill everyone in the settlement.

The group decide to make a stand along with the miners in the reactor room and are besieged by Ferrous Corp soldiers. Meanwhile, the Raza returns to the planet and is attacked by the Deliverance, but is joined by two battle cruisers from the Mikkei Combine, a rival to Ferrous. Two tells the Deliverance to stand down, and invites Nieman to the Raza to meet the Mikkei commanders, who announce that the colony is under the protectorate of the Mikkei Combine.

Two explains to the group that the best way to fight the corporations is to play them against each other; when she left orbit, she went to the nearest Mikkei outpost to negotiate a 99 year lease with them on the miners' behalf, which the miners have signed. One is invited to stay on the planet by Mireille, the young woman with the sun pendant, but declines, feeling that his place at least for now is on the Raza. The crew set course for the nearest space station where they'll be able to refuel and resupply.

With the ship in FTL again, Five tells Two that she has a memory – belonging to someone else on the crew – of causing their amnesia; this was done because they are dangerous.

== Reception ==
=== Ratings ===
"Episode Two" was watched by 262,000 overnight viewers on the Space channel in Canada., and 946,000 viewers on Syfy, with a 0.22 18-49 rating during its first airing.

=== Critical reception ===
Reaction to the episode from critics were generally positive, with Michael Ahr from Den of Geek noting that "Personalities begin to blossom" and that there is a solid foundation forming. He notes with great interest the various plot elements unraveling during the episode, including that of the various corporations that have come into play, the mysterious door, and Five's dreams. Tom Gardiner from Three if by Space comments that "Dark Matter is a character-driven show that’s well-written and full of great dialogue" and praises the VFX and stunt work on the show. Mitch Salem from Showbuzz Daily however was critical of the writing and referred to the show as an "Utterly basic genre piece"
