= Episode One (Dark Matter) =

- Dark Matter episode
- Episode no.: Season 1 Episode 1
- Directed by: TJ Scott
- Written by: Joseph Mallozzi; Paul Mullie
- Original air date: June 12, 2015

Guest appearances
- Amanda Brugel as Keeley; David Hewlett as Tabor Calchek (photo only, uncredited)

Episode chronology
← Previous —	Next → "Episode Two"

"Episode One" is the first episode of the Space science fiction series Dark Matter.

The episode was written by series creators and executive producers Joseph Mallozzi and Paul Mullie, and directed by TJ Scott. The episode first aired in Canada on June 12, 2015.

== Plot ==
A damaged spaceship drifts with its crew of six in stasis. As the ship's life support system gradually fails, the crew wake up one by one. The first, a man (Marc Bendavid), makes his way to the bridge but has no idea how to fix the situation. He is soon attacked by the second to awaken, a woman (Melissa O'Neil), because he is in her way; she uses a console to bring life support back to normal function. Another man (Anthony Lemke) joins them and demands at gunpoint to know who they are; neither of them know. As the others awaken - two more men (Alex Mallari Jr., Roger Cross) come fourth and sixth, while the fifth is a teenage girl (Jodelle Ferland) - the crew find that not one of them has any memory of their past.

The group adopt provisional names, One through Six, in order of their awakening. They find that the ship is carrying a wide variety of guns. They split into pairs to explore the ship. One and Four discover the training room, where Four demonstrates skill with swords, while Three and Six discover the ship's android (Zoie Palmer) in stasis. On the bridge, Two and Five discover a security protocol in effect and learn that Three and Six are under attack by the Android. Two sends One and Four to assist them; after a brief battle the Android is deactivated by Two, who wipes her protocols.

With the Android incapacitated, Two sets about repairing her and listens as the group voices their concerns about her. Two explains that she is no longer a threat, and once reactivated she should be back to normal. Two activates the Android and asks her to recover any files relating to the crew but she tells them that they're not accessible at this time.

Meanwhile, Five displays her electronic skill to Six, and on the bridge the Android and Two discuss repairs, but are interrupted when the ship comes under attack from an unidentified assailant. At the Android's suggestion, they make a series of maneuvers to evade the incoming missiles; this causes a brief loss of ship gravity, and Five is injured in a fall. They learn from the Android that their next pre-programmed destination is a planet 12 hours away by FTL.

While in FTL, Five recovers and tells Six about a mysterious door that may have the answers they're looking for behind it. At the same time elsewhere, Three attempts unsuccessfully to blast this same door and is knocked out when he is thrown against the bulkhead by the blowback. Meanwhile, One discovers a sun pendant in his bed, and Four examines a puzzle box he found hidden in a locker.

When they arrive at the planet, One, Three, Four and Six travel to the surface along with the Android in a Marauder-class shuttle (which only Six knows how to pilot) to find answers and discover that they are at a mining colony under imminent threat from a corporation called Ferrous Corp that wants to wipe them out and claim the planet and nearby asteroid field for itself. The miners expect to be attacked by a monstrous group known as "the Raza", deniable enforcers for such corporations, infamous for leaving no survivors. One notices one of the women wearing a familiar sun pendant and learns that it came from Hrothgar, an ally of the colony who had promised to buy weapons. On the ship, Five tells Two about fragments of memory she's been experiencing that she believes belong to other crew members.

After the landing party return to the ship, One urges that they assist the colony, believing the arms they are carrying are meant for the miners. One, Five and Six vote to deliver the cargo while Three and Four vote not to get involved. Two, who has assumed de facto leadership, decides that they will give the miners half of their weapons shipment and keep the other half to sell for profit elsewhere.

The crew begin loading the arms aboard the shuttle, but are interrupted when Two summons them to the bridge. The Android has recovered important data: their names and history. Mugshots and security footage from the Galactic Authority identify One, Two, Three, Four and Six as Jace Corso, Portia Lin, Marcus Boone, Ryo Tetsudo and Griffin Jones, respectively. All but Five, who is not in the files, are wanted for several felonies including murder and piracy. The ship's name is "the Raza". They have come not to help the colonists but to kill them.

== Reception ==
=== Ratings ===
"Episode One" was watched by 273,000 overnight viewers on the Space channel in Canada, and 1.28 million viewers on Syfy, with a 0.3 18-49 rating during its first airing.

With Live+7 DVR viewing factored in, the episode had an overall rating of 2.04 million viewers.

=== Critical reception ===
Reaction to the episode from critics was mixed, with Matt Fowler from IGN noting that "Those yearning for Syfy channel's return to space might feel appeased by Dark Matter" and notes that the "opening chapter does little to inspire further exploration", and gives the episode an overall 5.0 out of 10 rating. Mitch Salem from Showbuzz Daily also noted that he felt that "The characters are interchangeably uninteresting" and believed that it may have been down to the characters not knowing their real identities. Overall he felt it wasn't a promising way to start the series, and also talked about how he believed the show had low production values, and felt even the director TJ Scott couldn't make them seem more expensive than what they were.
