= Dark Matter (comics) =

Comic book series

- Cover to Dark Matter #1, art by Garry Brown
- Created by: Joseph Mallozzi; Paul Mullie

Publication information
- Publisher: Dark Horse Comics
- Schedule: Monthly
Title(s)
Rebirth #1-4
- Formats: Limited Series
- Original language: English
- Genre: Science fiction
- Publication date: January–April 2012
- Number of issues: 4
- Main character(s): Jace Corso (One), Portia Lin (Two), Marcus Boone (Three), Ryo Tetsuda (Four), unnamed girl (Five), Griffin Jones (Six), The Android

Creative team
- Writer(s): Joseph Mallozzi; Paul Mullie
- Artist(s): Garry Brown
- Letterer(s): Richard Starkings; Comicraft
- Colorist(s): Ryan Hill
- Editor(s): Patrick Thorpe

Dark Matter is an American four-issue science fiction comic book series created by writers Joseph Mallozzi and Paul Mullie. The story follows six individuals who wake up in a spacecraft with no memory of their past. The concept was originally intended for a television series, but was published through Dark Horse Comics with art by Garry Brown. On October 15, 2014, Syfy announced they had picked up a 13-episode first season of a Dark Matter TV series, which premiered on June 12, 2015. The first episode of the TV series adapts the plot of the first two issues, and the second episode adapts the latter two issues.

== Publication history ==
Mallozzi credits The Shield, The Dirty Dozen, and the Thunderbolts as his inspiration for the concept. The series was originally designed for television, but was later altered into a comic series for Dark Horse Comics. Syfy and Space, along with the original creators Mallozzi and Mullie, later adapted the comics to a television series that premiered on June 12, 2015 and ran for three seasons.

The comic series was originally published as four individual issues from January to April in 2012, and collected as a graphic novel edition entitled Dark Matter: Rebirth released in October 2012.

== Plot ==
After waking on board a spacecraft with no memories, four men, a woman and a girl arrive at a mining colony, the craft's preset destination. They land and meet the locals, who tell the crew about a group of mercenaries called the Raza being sent to kill the colonists so a corporation named Ferrous Corp can claim the planet. Upon returning to their ship to discuss helping or abandoning the colonists, the crew learn from files recovered by the ship's service android that they are the mercenaries the locals fear and each of them is guilty of a wide range of terrible crimes (with the exception of the girl, whose name and record are not in the files). When Ferrous Corp's army arrives to destroy the colony, four of the crew members join with the colonists to repel the invaders. The other two take the spacecraft and negotiate a contract for the colony with a different corporation, the Mikkei Combine. The invading Ferrous Corp troops leave, and the crew return to their spacecraft, unsure of where they will go next and where their journey will take them.

== Critical reception ==
The series received positive reviews, and the first issue was the 256th North American best selling comic by units in January 2012.
