= Dark Matter (2015 TV series) =

Canadian science fiction TV series

- Title card since the second season
- Genre: Space opera
- Created by: Joseph Mallozzi; Paul Mullie
- Based on: Dark Matter by: Joseph Mallozzi; Paul Mullie
- Starring: Marc Bendavid; Melissa O'Neil; Anthony Lemke; Alex Mallari Jr.; Jodelle Ferland; Roger Cross; Zoie Palmer; Melanie Liburd; Shaun Sipos; Ellen Wong
- Composer: Benjamin Pinkerton
- Countries of origin: Canada; United States
- Original language: English
- No. of seasons: 3
- No. of episodes: 39 (list of episodes)

Production
- Executive producers: Joseph Mallozzi; Paul Mullie; Jay Firestone; Vanessa Piazza; Keith Goldberg; Mike Richardson
- Production locations: Toronto, Ontario, Canada
- Running time: 43 minutes
- Production companies: Blue Penguin; Prescience; Dark Horse Entertainment; Prodigy Pictures Inc.

Original release
- Network: Space; Syfy
- Release: June 12, 2015 – August 25, 2017

Dark Matter is a science fiction television series that premiered in 2015, developed by Prodigy Pictures in association with the Space channel and the Syfy channel. The concept was created by Joseph Mallozzi and Paul Mullie while they were working on the Stargate franchise, and was originally published as a comic book series in 2012.

An order for 13 episodes was placed for the first season of the series, which premiered on June 12, 2015, on both Space and Syfy. On September 5, 2015, the series was renewed for a second season. Dark Matter was renewed for a third season in September 2016, which premiered on June 9, 2017. On September 1, 2017, Syfy canceled the series.

== Premise ==
A group of people in stasis pods awaken aboard the starship Raza. They have no memories of who they are or their lives before awakening, so they assume the names One through Six in the order in which they left stasis and set about trying to uncover their identities and what happened to them. Also onboard is a female-looking android who has a wireless neural link to the ship.

At the end of the pilot episode, the crew discover that they are a band of mercenaries who are among the worst criminals in the galaxy, leaving them with the dilemma of continuing their original selves' violent path or seeking redemption. Their lives are frequently complicated by secrets from their forgotten pasts.

== Episodes ==
Season	Episodes	Originally released	
Season	Episodes	First released	Last released
1	13	June 12, 2015	August 28, 2015
2	13	July 1, 2016	September 16, 2016
3	13	June 9, 2017	August 25, 2017

== Cast and characters ==
=== Main ===
- Marc Bendavid as One / Jace Corso / Derrick Moss (season 1; recurring, season 2)
- Melissa O'Neil as Two / Portia Lin / Rebecca, the de facto captain of the Raza, who was the leader before the mindwipe as well
- Anthony Lemke as Three / Marcus Boone / Titch
- Alex Mallari Jr. as Four / Ryo Tetsudo / Ishida Ryo, the exiled heir to the throne of the Principality of Zairon
- Jodelle Ferland as Five / Das / Emily Kolburn, the youngest member of the crew and the only one not wanted for capital crimes
- Roger Cross as Six / Griffin Jones / Lt. Kal Varrick
- Zoie Palmer as The Android / Suki. Palmer also plays the Android's creator Dr. Irena Shaw in the third season.
- Melanie Liburd as Nyx Harper (season 2; guest, season 3), a new crewmember in the second season on the run from the rest of her people, the Seers
- Shaun Sipos as Devon Taltherd (season 2), a disgraced doctor and new crewmember in the second season

=== Recurring ===
- David Hewlett as Tabor Calchek, the crew's unreliable handler and "talent" agent
- Jeff Teräväinen as Lt. John Anders, a Galactic Authority officer and former partner of Six
- Torri Higginson as Commander Delaney Truffault of the Mikkei Combine, an occasional ally
- David Richmond-Peck as Commander Nieman of Ferrous Corp
- Natalie Brown as Sarah, Marcus Boone's lover. Though she dies of an incurable illness in season 1, in season 3 the Android finds her consciousness had been digitally uploaded into the Raza's server.
- Ellen Wong as Misaki Han-Shireikan, commander of the Ishida Royal Guard and childhood friend of Ryo (seasons 2–3)
- Ennis Esmer as Wexler, a manic sociopath and the leader of a mercenary group who are hired by Delaney Truffault to work with the Raza crew but prove untrustworthy. Although Wexler is killed during season 1, an alternate reality version of him returns in seasons 2 and 3, from a universe where the Raza were never mindwiped and are still villains, with the crew consisting of Portia Lin, Marcus Boone, Jace Corso, Wexler and Tash. This version is significantly less brutal and ultimately sides with the main-universe crew.
- Mike Dopud as Arax Nero, the leader of a prison gang (season 2)
- Kris Holden-Ried as Galactic Authority Inspector Kyle Kierken (season 2)
- Brendan Murray as Victor, leader of a group of rogue androids and love interest for the Raza's Android (seasons 2–3)
- Andrew Moodie as Teku Fonsei, Ryo's former teacher, whom Ryo appoints an advisor after seizing the throne of Zairon (season 3)
- Mishka Thébaud as Adrian Maro, former assistant to Calchek, who travels with the crew of the Raza during the first half of season 3
- Ayisha Issa as Solara Shockley, Maro's bodyguard, who also travels with the crew until she leaves with Adrian (season 3)
- Wil Wheaton as Alex Rook, President and CEO of Dwarf Star Technologies

=== Guest ===
- Andrew Jackson as The General, the leader of the terrorist group Procyon Insurrection to which Six once belonged
- Amanda Brugel as Keeley, a miner the Raza crew encounter on a mission
- Ruby Rose as Wendy, an entertainment model android
- Rachael Ancheril as Della, a colonist on a planet oppressed by Traugott Corporation
- Dan Jeannotte as Derrick Moss, One's original identity before assuming that of Jace Corso
- Jessica Sipos as Tash, a member of Wexler's mercenary group. Although Tash is killed during season 1, an alternate reality version of her returns in seasons 2 and 3 as part of the parallel Raza crew.
- Jon Cor as Vons, a member of Wexler's mercenary group, who may be Tash's brother, lover or both - they don't subscribe to "outdated social categories"
- Conrad Pla as Cain, a member of Wexler's mercenary group
- Kerr Hewitt as Sgt. Voss, a Ferrous Corp soldier who serves aboard the FCS Deliverance
- Franka Potente as Chief Inspector Shaddick of the Galactic Authority's Serious Crimes Division (season 2)
- Inga Cadranel as Alicia Reynaud, a businesswoman who wants what Emily Kolburn (Five) stole (season 2)
- Jean Yoon as Dr. Hajek, a scientist on Ishida Research Station, who was studying the Blink Drive for Emperor Ryo.(Season 3, Episode 2)
- Paul Sun-Hyung Lee as Dr. Borsin, another scientist on Ishida Research Station, working with Dr. Hajek on the Blink Drive. (Season 3, Episode 2)

== Production ==
Principal photography for the first season began in Toronto, Ontario, Canada, on January 9, 2015, and concluded on May 20, 2015.

On September 1, 2015, Syfy renewed Dark Matter for a second season. Chris Regina, Syfy's senior VP of program strategy, said that "With its mysterious premise and fascinating characters, Dark Matter has built an incredibly loyal, passionate and engaged fan base. We look forward to another out-of-this-world season from this talented creative team." Production on the second season began on December 9, 2015, and concluded May 6, 2016.

The third season began production on November 18, 2016. Dark Matter's third season would be its last; its cancellation was announced in September 2017. According to Mallozzi in various interviews, the show was picked up by Syfy's acquisition division in New York, but it was not well received by the network's original programming division in Los Angeles. In addition, while the series was outperforming several Syfy first-run programs, the network was unable to monetize the show because it was an acquisition.

== Broadcast ==
Dark Matter premiered on Syfy in the United States on the same day as Canada. Within the following week, the series premiered on Syfy Australia and Syfy UK – on June 13 and 16, 2015, respectively.

== Reception ==
As of 21 March 2022, review aggregation website Rotten Tomatoes gave season 1 an approval rating of 68%, with an average rating of 5/10 based on reviews from 19 critics. The site's consensus statement says: "... [the] premiere benefits from likable characters and a concluding twist, but its gaping plot holes and worn premise add up to an aimless episode". Metacritic gave the series an average score of 58 out of 100, based on reviews from 5 critics, indicating "Mixed or average reviews".

Season 2 received a 100% rating on Rotten Tomatoes based on 7 reviews, and season 3 also received a 100% rating based on 7 reviews.

=== Ratings ===
The series premiere pulled 273,000 overnight viewers on the Space channel in Canada, and 1.28 million viewers for its premiere on the Syfy channel in the U.S.

== See also ==
- List of science fiction television programs
- List of science fiction TV and radio shows produced in Canada
