= Paul Mullie =

Canadian-American screenwriter & producer

Paul Mullie is a Canadian-American screenwriter and producer. He is credited for writing episodes of Stargate Atlantis, Largo Winch, and Stargate SG-1. He has also worked as executive producer on Stargate: Atlantis and is the co-creator of Dark Matter with Joseph Mallozzi.

== Writing credits ==
- Stargate SG-1
  - Season 4
    - Window of Opportunity
    - Scorched Earth
    - Point of No Return
    - The Curse
    - Chain Reaction
    - Prodigy (with Joseph Mallozzi, Brad Wright)
    - Exodus
  - Season 5
    - Enemies (with Joseph Mallozzi, Brad Wright, Robert C. Cooper)
    - The Fifth Man
    - The Tomb
    - Desperate Measures
    - Wormhole X-Treme! (with Joseph Mallozzi, Brad Wright)
    - Summit
    - Fail Safe
    - Revelations
  - Season 6
    - Descent
    - Night Walkers
    - Shadow Play
    - Prometheus
    - Disclosure
    - Prophecy
  - Season 7
    - Homecoming
    - Revisions
    - Avenger 2.0
    - Fallout (with Joseph Mallozzi, Corin Nemec)
    - Inauguration
  - Season 8
    - New Order 1 (Part 1 Only)
    - Lockdown
    - Endgame
    - It's Good to be King (with Joseph Mallozzi, Michael Greenburg, Peter DeLuise)
    - Full Alert
    - Moebius 1&2 (with Joseph Mallozzi, Brad Wright, Robert C. Cooper)
  - Season 9
    - The Ties That Bind
    - Ex Deus Machina
    - Collateral Damage
    - Ripple Effect (with Joseph Mallozzi, Brad Wright)
    - The Scouge
    - Camelot
  - Season 10
    - Morpheus
    - 200 (with Joseph Mallozzi, Brad Wright, Robert C. Cooper, Martin Gero, Carl Binder & Alan McCullough)
    - Counterstrike
    - Memento Mori
    - The Quest 1&2
    - Family Ties
