= Joseph Mallozzi =

Canadian writer and producer (born 1965)

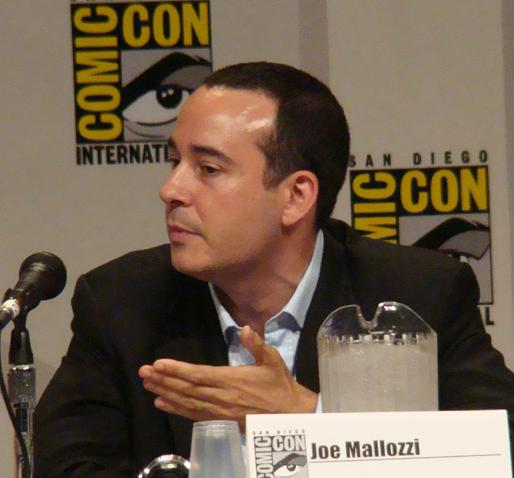
- Joe Mallozzi at San Diego Comic-Con 2007
- Born: 16 October 1965 (age 60); Canada
- Other name: Joe Mallozzi
- Occupations: Screenwriter; Executive producer
- Website: Joseph Mallozzi blog

Joseph Mallozzi (born 16 October 1965) is a Canadian writer and producer.

He is most noted for his contributions to the Stargate SG-1, Stargate: Atlantis and Stargate Universe television series and as showrunner of Dark Matter. He joined the Stargate production team at the start of Stargate SG-1's fourth season in 2000. He was a writer and executive producer for all three Stargate series.

On television, he worked as a writer in cartoons such as Animal Crackers, The Little Lulu Show, Flying Rhino Junior High, Caillou, The Busy World of Richard Scarry, The Adventures of Paddington Bear, George and Martha, Mona the Vampire, and Ripley's Believe It or Not!, among others.

In 2012, he co-created the comic book Dark Matter with Paul Mullie. The comic book has been made into a TV series (Dark Matter) with Mallozzi and Mullie co-writing. Pre production on this Prodigy Pictures Inc series started in Canada and aired on Jun 12, 2015. In February 2020, Utopia Falls, which he co-produced with R.T. Thorne, premiered on streaming service Hulu; the show did not renew for a second season. As of 2021, Mallozzi is set to adapt The Powder Mage trilogy to television.

== Writing credits ==
=== Stargate SG-1 ===
- Window of Opportunity (with Paul Mullie)
- Scorched Earth (with Paul Mullie)
- Point of No Return (with Paul Mullie)
- The Curse (with Paul Mullie)
- Chain Reaction (with Paul Mullie)
- Prodigy (with Paul Mullie, Brad Wright)
- Exodus (with Paul Mullie)
- Enemies (with Paul Mullie, Brad Wright, Robert C. Cooper)
- The Fifth Man (with Paul Mullie)
- The Tomb (with Paul Mullie)
- Desperate Measures (with Paul Mullie)
- Wormhole X-Treme (with Paul Mullie, Brad Wright)
- Summit (with Paul Mullie)
- Fail Safe (with Paul Mullie)
- Revelations (with Paul Mullie)
- Descent (with Paul Mullie)
- Nightwalkers (with Paul Mullie)
- Shadow Play (with Paul Mullie)
- Prometheus (with Paul Mullie)
- Disclosure (with Paul Mullie)
- Prophecy (with Paul Mullie)
- Homecoming (with Paul Mullie)
- Revisions (with Paul Mullie)
- Avenger 2.0 (with Paul Mullie)
- Fallout (with Paul Mullie, Corin Nemec)
- Inauguration (with Paul Mullie)
- New Order, Part One (with Paul Mullie)
- Lockdown (with Paul Mullie)
- Endgame (with Paul Mullie)
- It's Good to be King (with Paul Mullie, Michael Greenburg & Peter DeLuise)
- Full Alert (with Paul Mullie)
- Moebius, Part One (with Paul Mullie, Brad Wright, Robert C. Cooper)
- Moebius, Part Two (with Paul Mullie, Brad Wright, Robert C. Cooper)
- The Ties That Bind (with Paul Mullie)
- Ex Deus Machina (with Paul Mullie)
- Collateral Damage (with Paul Mullie)
- Ripple Effect (with Paul Mullie, Brad Wright)
- The Scourge (with Paul Mullie)
- Camelot (with Paul Mullie)
- Morpheus (with Paul Mullie)
- 200 (with Paul Mullie, Brad Wright, Robert C. Cooper, Martin Gero, Carl Binder & Alan McCullough)
- Counterstrike (with Paul Mullie)
- Memento Mori (with Paul Mullie)
- The Quest, Part One (with Paul Mullie)
- The Quest, Part Two (with Paul Mullie)
- Family Ties (with Paul Mullie)

=== Stargate Atlantis ===
- Suspicion (with Paul Mullie)
- Home (with Paul Mullie)
- The Siege, Part Two (with Paul Mullie)
- The Intruder (with Paul Mullie)
- The Tower (with Paul Mullie)
- Misbegotten (with Paul Mullie)
- Irresponsible (with Paul Mullie)
- Reunion (with Paul Mullie)
- Travelers (with Paul Mullie)
- This Mortal Coil (with Paul Mullie, Brad Wright)
- The Kindred, Part One (with Paul Mullie)
- The Kindred, Part Two (with Paul Mullie)
- The Last Man (with Paul Mullie)
- The Seed (with Paul Mullie)
- Broken Ties (with Paul Mullie)
- Whispers (with Paul Mullie)
- Remnants (with Paul Mullie)
- Enemy at the Gate (with Paul Mullie)

=== Stargate Universe ===
- Space (with Paul Mullie)
- Divided (with Paul Mullie)
- Subversion (with Paul Mullie)
- Incursion, Part 1 (with Paul Mullie)
- Incursion, Part 2 (with Paul Mullie)
- Intervention (with Paul Mullie)
- Awakening (with Paul Mullie)
- Trial and Error (with Paul Mullie)
- Resurgence (with Paul Mullie)
- Deliverance (with Paul Mullie)
- The Hunt (with Paul Mullie)
- Gauntlet (with Paul Mullie)
