= Carson Beckett =

Fictional character in the TV series Stargate Atlantis

- Paul McGillion as Carson Beckett in a promotional photograph for Stargate Atlantis Season 1.
- First appearance: "Rising" (Atlantis)
- Created by: Robert C. Cooper; Brad Wright
- Portrayed by: Paul McGillion

In-universe information
- Species: Human
- Occupation: Medical doctor
- Family: mother
- Nationality: Scottish

Dr. Carson Beckett is a fictional Scottish character in the 2004 Canadian-American science fiction television series Stargate Atlantis, a spin-off series of Stargate SG-1. He is portrayed by Scottish-born Canadian actor Paul McGillion, who previously played Dr. Ernest Littlefield in the first season of SG-1. The character's Scottish nationality was only decided after McGillion's audition.

Dr. Beckett's character arc begins in the pilot episode "Rising". He is the discoverer and a carrier of the fictional Ancient Technology Activation gene, which allows humans to interact with specialized Ancient technology such as the Atlantis base. His medical expertise and his history with the Ancient gene earns him a spot on the Atlantis expedition, where he becomes the expedition's chief medical officer. Beckett is killed in an explosion in the third-season episode "Sunday", but he returns as a clone in season four and five.

The character's appearances were marked by positive reception. Despite being billed as a recurring character at first, he appeared in nearly every episode of the first season before the producers promoted him to a main character for the second and third seasons. The fan reaction to the character's death in season three was so strong that the Stargate Atlantis producers re-introduced the character in a recurring role in seasons four and five. In 2005, Paul McGillion was nominated for a Leo Award for "Best Supporting Performance by a Male" for his role as Beckett.

== Role in Stargate Atlantis ==
=== Character arc ===
Carson Beckett is stated to have been born in Scotland in a family of seven. His mother, who is mentioned throughout the series, is only briefly shown in "Rising". Beckett was born with the Ancient Technology Activation (ATA) gene, which gives the carrier the ability to access Ancient technology. At the beginning of Stargate Atlantis, Beckett is a doctor with an extended knowledge of medicine and just discovered the Ancient gene. Elizabeth Weir selected him for the Atlantis Expedition and stationed him at the Ancient outpost in Antarctica, where the SG-1 team had defeated the nemesis Anubis in the Stargate SG-1 season seven finale, "Lost City".

While in the Antarctic outpost in the pilot episode "Rising", Dr. Rodney McKay forces Beckett to sit in an Ancient control chair. Beckett's Ancient gene causes him to accidentally activate a drone weapon zeroing on General O'Neill and Major Sheppard's helicopter, but he manages to stop it. After finding and arriving in the city of Atlantis, Beckett examines a severed Wraith arm that Major Sheppard brought back from the planet Athos. Beckett can provide the first information about Wraith physiology and becomes the chief medical officer in Atlantis. In "Hide and Seek", he creates a gene therapy that emulates the ATA gene in normal humans with a 48 percent success rate. In "Poisoning the Well", Beckett helps the Hoffans develop a drug that kills the Wraith who feed on humans, but the drug has the side effect of killing 50 percent of the human recipients as well. One of the casualties is Perna, a Hoffan woman he has grown attached to. Carson leaves in disgust when the Hoffans decide to disseminate the drug among their people at all costs. In "The Gift", he discovers that Teyla has Wraith DNA in her genetic makeup, which allows her to tap into the Wraith psychic network in this and future episodes. In the second season, Beckett takes up more offworld activities, including one mission where he removes a Wraith tracker from Ronon Dex's spine in "Runner".

In "Instinct", Beckett develops a retrovirus to turn Wraith into humans by stripping the Iratus DNA from them. After the first subject, a Wraith girl named Ellia, experiences the opposite of the desired effect, he tests a perfected retrovirus on a captured Wraith named Michael. Although the experiment works, Michael discovers his identity and reverts into a Wraith after his escape. In the season two finale, "Allies", Michael contacts Atlantis with a proposal to use the retrovirus against rival Wraith hives, but Beckett realizes Michael's betrayal too late. After Michael's Wraith ships are stopped from getting to Earth in "Misbegotten", the humanized Wraith are transported to an isolated planet (M8G-352), where Beckett teaches them how to administer the retrovirus. However, a group led by Michael realize their true histories and capture him. Beckett is later rescued by his teammates, not knowing that Michael has taken a sample of Beckett's DNA. A group of Ancients evict the expedition from Atlantis in the mid season three two-parter "The Return". Beckett is given a surgery post at Stargate Command (SGC) on Earth, but he and some former expedition teammates return to the city to save it from Asuran siege and imminent destruction by the SGC. In "Sunday", Beckett is killed while attempting to safely dispose an explosive tumor that he had removed from a patient. His body and personal effects are sent back to his family on Earth. McKay, who had developed a close friendship with Beckett, tells Beckett's mother himself. McKay later has a vision of Carson, brought on by his subconscious mind, which gives him the opportunity to say goodbye.

=== Cloned Beckett ===
During Beckett's capture on the planet M8G-352 in season 3's "Misbegotten", Michael took some of Beckett's DNA to make a clone. Michael forces the clone to work for him in perfecting the Hoffan drug until Sheppard and Lorne rescue the clone in season 4's "The Kindred", a year after the death of the real Beckett. Although the clone suffers from a degenerative condition that will lead to his death, he insists on helping the team find the pregnant Teyla from Michael's capture. Eventually, Dr. Keller places the clone into stasis until a cure can be found. In season 5's "The Seed", the clone is injected with a cure from Michael's database on M2S-445 and is called upon to help discover a cure for an advancing disease on Keller. Upon completion, he is sent back to Earth. Cloned Beckett briefly returns to Atlantis in "Whispers" to stop a herd of Michael's failed experiments. In "Outsiders", cloned Beckett hopes to make up for the horrible deeds Michael performed using Beckett's research, and he begins to help humans in the Pegasus Galaxy who were infected with the Hoffan plague. In the Atlantis series finale, Beckett flies the city from M35-117 back to Earth to defeat a super Wraith Hive Ship. Beckett pilots the city in battle against the hive ship, but is unable to defeat it. The city is nearly destroyed, but is saved at the last moment when Sheppard manages to destroy the hive ship from the inside with a nuclear weapon. Beckett is forced to land Atlantis, cloaked, outside San Francisco Bay and later stares at the view with the rest of the command staff.

=== Characteristics and relationships ===
Producer Martin Gero described Carson Beckett as the "older brother" in the Atlantis crew, a "superswell" and "loveable guy" who has a lot of "heart and warmth". McGillion described his character as trepidatious, but Beckett gains more courage throughout the series as he becomes more familiar with his surroundings in Atlantis and offworld. Beckett can fly a Puddle Jumper, albeit reluctantly, and his piloting skills are shown to be flawed at best. He also despises Stargate travel, and is once compared with the Star Trek character Dr. McCoy. In "Duet", Beckett admits to be somewhat infatuated with Lt. Laura Cadman, who at the time is trapped in McKay's consciousness. When Cadman learns of this, she shares a passionate kiss with Beckett through McKay's body. Beckett and Cadman have an off-screen relationship until season 3; Beckett blames the difficulties of the relationship on their first kiss through McKay. Although McKay often condescends Beckett as he usually does to all his colleagues, McKay considers him a close friend. Martin Gero stated that Beckett and McKay often complement each other in a "wonderful" way. Although they have completely different personalities, they are the "everyday hero guys", and often share their thoughts after saving Atlantis or the galaxy from dire situations. Paul McGillion and David Hewlett (McKay) are also good friends in real life. Despite their personality differences, Beckett and Ronon Dex get along fairly well. In their first meeting, Beckett removed Ronon's tracking device, effectively saving his life. When Ronon is about to be killed by a powerful Wraith, Beckett disobeys Ronon's wishes to let him fight alone and kills the Wraith himself, quipping "if he doesn't like it, he can sue me." Surprisingly, Ronon is grateful to Beckett for his assistance rather than angry. Ronon is later shown to be devastated by the real Beckett's death and admits its hard for him to see the cloned Beckett be forced into stasis to possibly never return.

== Conceptual history ==
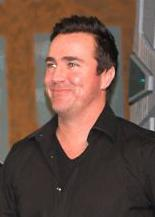
Paul McGillion, who portrayed Beckett at the Pegasus Three convention in London, 2008.

Paul McGillion's first role in the Stargate franchise was playing the young Dr. Ernest Littlefield in the early Stargate SG-1 episode "The Torment of Tantalus" in 1997. The Scottish-born Canadian actor did not return to Stargate until Brad Wright and Robert C. Cooper held auditions for the spin-off series Stargate Atlantis in 2003–2004. Carson Beckett was originally meant to be an international character, but McGillion decided during his audition to play Beckett as a Scottish character. McGillion was in Portugal when his agent informed him that he got the part of Carson Beckett.

According to writer-producer Martin Gero, Beckett was set to appear in only a handful of episodes after the Stargate Atlantis' pilot episode, "Rising", but the character had such a big connection to the fans that Gero labeled McGillion the "breakout star" in Stargate Atlantis. The producers decided to give Beckett a larger role and made him a recurring character with a total of fifteen episode appearances in the first season, followed by a regular in season two. Although McGillion was born in Scotland, he only put on a Scottish accent during filming. McGillion said in an interview with The Sci-Fi World, "We improv[ise] a lot after the scene's over, and sometimes they'll keep some of the material and sometimes they won't. I'll often throw in little things like 'Ya cheeky little bugger'."

When the episode "Duet" was conceived, the writers wanted to maximise the chemistry and friendship between Beckett and McKay. Martin Gero came up with the scene featuring a kiss between Beckett and McKay. Reportedly, Gero tricked McGillion into agreeing to play the kiss by lying that David Hewlett was asked first and had already agreed. McGillion was originally planned to play Scotty in a parody of Star Trek in the Stargate SG-1 episode "200", but producer-writer Brad Wright filled in for the part in the end. (McGillion would later also audition for the part of Scotty in the upcoming eleventh Star Trek movie, but the role was given to Simon Pegg and McGillion was cast for a small part in the movie.)

After the second season of Stargate Atlantis, cast and crew members hinted that McGillion might depart from the series. Reports in November 2006 confirmed that Beckett would "disappear" somewhere in the second half of the third season, and would only appear in several episodes in the fourth season. Jewel Staite was announced to play Dr. Keller, the new doctor of the Atlantis expedition. McGillion learned of the writers' exact plans for Beckett's departure in "Sunday" two months before the episode was filmed. He said that he cried when reading the episode's script. Producer Joseph Mallozzi regretted killing off Dr. Beckett after seeing the fans' reactions, and claimed there was a 'clue' in a late-season 3 episode that hinted at Beckett's re-introduction. After Beckett's reappearance in the fourth-season episode "The Kindred", Mallozzi confirmed that Beckett had not ascended upon his death, that McKay had only imagined Beckett at the end of "Sunday", and that the character in "The Kindred" was Beckett in the flesh instead of a version from an alternate universe or from the past. A press release for season 5 mentioned that Beckett would return for at least five episodes in the new season.

== Reception ==
Carson Beckett is often described by fans as the "Heart of Atlantis". Paul McGillion was nominated for a Leo Award for "Best Supporting Performance by a Male" in 2005 for his role as Beckett in "Poisoning the Well", but he and fellow Atlantis actor David Nykl lost to Matthew Currie Holmes of Godiva's. A group of fans set up a campaign at "savecarsonbeckett.com" before news of McGillion's departure was confirmed. Although the episode "Sunday" was highly admired, his death caused dismay and outrage among fans and critics. Maureen Ryan of the Chicago Tribune labelled the killing of Beckett a "bonehead decision". The producers did not anticipate the protest after the airing of the episode. Between 60 and 100 fans from all over the world gathered for a peaceful protest outside The Bridge Studios in Vancouver on March 22, 2007, hiring a local pipe band. Another protest followed at San Diego Comic-Con on July 27, 2007.
