= Stargate Atlantis season 1 =

Stargate Atlantis
- Season 1
- DVD cover
- No. of episodes: 20

Release
- Original network: Sci Fi Channel
- Original release: July 16, 2004 – January 31, 2005

Season chronology
- Next → Season 2

The first season of the television series Stargate Atlantis commenced airing on the Sci Fi Channel in the United States on July 16, 2004, concluded on The Movie Network in Canada on January 31, 2005, and contained 20 episodes. The show was a spin off of sister show, Stargate SG-1. Stargate Atlantis re-introduced supporting characters from the SG-1 universe, such as Elizabeth Weir and Rodney McKay among others. The show also included new characters such as Teyla Emmagan and John Sheppard. The first season is about a military-science expedition team discovering Atlantis and exploring the Pegasus Galaxy. However, there is no way to return home, and they inadvertently wake a hostile alien race known as the Wraith, whose primary goal is to gather a fleet to invade Atlantis and find their new "feeding ground", Earth.

The two-hour premiere "Rising", which aired on July 16, 2004, received Sci Fi Channel's highest-ever rating for a series premiere and episode ever released, it is also the most watched broadcast release ever released by the Sci Fi Channel in the United States. The average viewing rate for the first ten episodes were around 3-4 million in the United States. The series was developed by Brad Wright and Robert C. Cooper, who also served as executive producers. Season one regular cast members included Joe Flanigan, Torri Higginson, Rachel Luttrell, with Rainbow Sun Francks, and David Hewlett.

== Cast ==
- Starring Joe Flanigan as Major John Sheppard
- Torri Higginson as Dr. Elizabeth Weir
- Rachel Luttrell as Teyla Emmagan
- With Rainbow Sun Francks as First Lieutenant Aiden Ford
- And David Hewlett as Dr. Rodney McKay

== Episodes ==
Episodes in bold are continuous episodes, where the story spans over 2 or more episodes.

No. overall	No. in season	Title	Directed by	Written by	Original release date
1	1	"**Rising**"	Martin Wood	Brad Wright & Robert C. Cooper	July 16, 2004
2	2	"**Rising**"	Martin Wood	Brad Wright & Robert C. Cooper	July 16, 2004
After relinquishing her position at Stargate Command, Dr. Elizabeth Weir has been working in the Antarctic Outpost, gathering members of an expedition to embark to the lost city of Atlantis. When they seem to be able to ascertain a gate address, a new adventure begins.
3	3	"Hide and Seek"	David Warry-Smith	Story by : Brad Wright & Robert C. Cooper; Teleplay by : Robert C. Cooper	July 23, 2004
Eager to experiment with new technology, Dr. McKay volunteers to be Dr. Beckett's first patient for his new ATA gene therapy. Now able to use a personal shield emitter, McKay recklessly tests its properties, only to find that it could lead to his death. Elsewhere, a "living shadow" entity threatens the city after it was accidentally released from a container where the Ancients were studying it. It roams the city looking for energy to feed on, and the more it feeds, the more lethal it becomes. Finally members of the Atlantis expedition manage to send it to planet M4X-337.
4	4	"Thirty-Eight Minutes"	Mario Azzopardi	Brad Wright	July 30, 2004
With Sheppard needing medical attention, the puddle jumper races to Atlantis, only to become lodged in the Stargate. Now, they only have 38 minutes until the stargate automatically dis-engages, and the jumper gets cut in two... leaving them to asphyxiate in outer space. (First appearance of David Nykl as Radek Zelenka)
5	5	"Suspicion"	Mario Azzopardi	Story by : Kerry Glover; Teleplay by : Joseph Mallozzi & Paul Mullie	August 6, 2004
When the offworld teams are attacked one time too many, Dr. Weir must consider that there is an Athosian spy in their midst, but upon further investigation, all evidence points to Teyla. Feeling betrayed, the Athosians resettle to the newly discovered mainland.
6	6	"Childhood's End"	David Winning	Martin Gero	August 13, 2004
The team visits M7G-677, a primitive world where no one is over 24 years old, because of ritual suicides they believe keep the Wraith at bay. McKay discovers that they are in fact being protected by an Ancient electromagnetic shield. He takes the ZPM powering it, unwittingly allowing a long-dormant Wraith transmitter to reactivate.
7	7	"Poisoning the Well"	Brad Turner	Story by : Mary Kaiser; Teleplay by : Damian Kindler	August 20, 2004
On planet Hoff, Dr. Beckett helps the Hoffans, humans who are developing a vaccine against the Wraith, complete the drug. Despite a 50% mortality rate and a warning from the Atlanteans that the Wraith are likely to destroy them as a potential threat, the Hoffans elect to take the drug.
8	8	"Underground"	Brad Turner	Peter DeLuise	August 27, 2004
In order to keep the expedition fed, the team visits the Genii to trade for food. Although Teyla believed them to be peaceful farmers, Sheppard and McKay find an underground bunker, letting them see the real face of the Genii. Note: First appearance of Colm Meaney as Chief Cowen.
9	9	"Home"	Holly Dale	Joseph Mallozzi & Paul Mullie	September 10, 2004
When Atlantis discovers M5S-224, a planet that will allow them to gate to Earth, they take the opportunity to visit Earth, after being assured that the Prometheus has been equipped with a new hyperdrive that will enable it to take them back to Atlantis. Yet, when the Prometheus is disabled, they find themselves stranded on Earth, and the team begins to question the mystery of their situation.
10	10	"**The Storm**"	Martin Wood	Story by : Jill Blotevogel; Teleplay by : Martin Gero	September 17, 2004
Exploring the planet, Sheppard and Teyla discover a colossal storm with the ability to crush the city in its current state. The Manarians (first mentioned in "Underground") give shelter to most of the Atlantis Expedition. McKay and Zelenka think of a daring way to power up the shield, but it's no coincidence that the Genii invade the city at their weakest moment. Note: First appearance of Robert Davi as Acastus Kolya.
11	11	"**The Eye**"	Martin Wood	Martin Gero	January 21, 2005
As Sheppard attempts to reclaim the city from the Genii, who still have Weir and McKay as hostages, the bulk of the storm fast approaches. Now, the rest of the team must take drastic measures to help wherever they can, before there is nothing left to save.
12	12	"The Defiant One"	Peter DeLuise	Peter DeLuise	January 28, 2005
Sheppard and McKay lead two scientists to survey an Ancient orbital defense platform discovered from the city's sensors. When they arrive via jumper, they find a Wraith distress beacon emanating from the nearest planet's surface... and are in for an unusual surprise.
13	13	"Hot Zone"	Mario Azzopardi	Martin Gero	February 4, 2005
Inspecting the city for storm damage, a party of scientists unleash a virus that causes hallucinations and eventually, death. Now, nearly a third of Atlantis' residents have been infected, forcing a lockdown. It's up to Sheppard to keep it from spreading, and eliminate it for good.
14	14	"Sanctuary"	James Head	Alan Brennert	February 11, 2005
Searching a new planet, the Wraith find the team, only for them to be shot down by a mysterious weapon. On the surface, they find a primitive world named Proculus that would make ideal sanctuary for those fleeing from the Wraith. But the inhabitants believe their goddess won't permit it.
15	15	"Before I Sleep"	Andy Mikita	Carl Binder	February 18, 2005
While exploring the city, the team stumbles upon a stasis unit holding an extremely old woman, whom they believe to be an Ancient. When they revive her, she claims to be Dr. Elizabeth Weir, and she has a story she's been waiting ten thousand years to tell.
16	16	"The Brotherhood"	Martin Wood	Martin Gero	February 25, 2005
The team searches for a Zero Point Module rumored to be hidden on the planet Dagan, an old Lantean outpost. The ancestors of the Daganians, the Sudarians, were entrusted with a ZPM some 10,000 years ago. In attempt to locate and excavate the ZPM, the team crosses paths with Kolya once more, but it's not the only thing to worry about when their new allies have motives of their own.
17	17	"Letters from Pegasus"	Mario Azzopardi	Carl Binder	March 4, 2005
With the Wraith fast approaching to claim the city, McKay finds a way to send a message back to Earth to get reinforcements. Meanwhile, Sheppard and Teyla go offworld to try to gather information on the Wraith fleet, but end up with a few hitchhikers.
18	18	"The Gift"	Peter DeLuise	Story by : Robert C. Cooper & Martin Gero; Teleplay by : Robert C. Cooper	March 11, 2005
Plagued by terrifying nightmares, Teyla tries to dive into her past offworld, where she finds an abandoned Wraith lab. Bringing back the findings, Dr. Beckett makes a surprising discovery in her DNA makeup, leading to a possible way to gather information from their enemy.
19	19	"'**The Siege**"	Martin Wood	Martin Gero	March 18, 2005
20	20	"'**The Siege**"	Martin Wood	Joseph Mallozzi & Paul Mullie	March 25, 2005
Part 1: McKay leads a team to activate the Ancients' orbital weapons platform to destroy the hive ships on the final stretch to the city. After the team has found a potential Atlantis Alpha Site (M1K-439 as "Planet Waterfall", the planet M1M-316 with Tyrannosaurus-like creatures, the Genii-occupied M4H-212, and M85-393 with intense daytime temperatures were rejected), the city's personnel are preparing for evacuation, when they discover the kamikaze dart pilot ("The Brotherhood") has survived in the city. Part 2: As a response to the message the expedition sent, the SGC sends Atlantis reinforcements via the Stargate using a ZPM. Now the Ancient power source is en route through the latest Earth battleship, the Daedalus, and they need to hold out for four days, or Atlantis risks destruction.

== Production ==
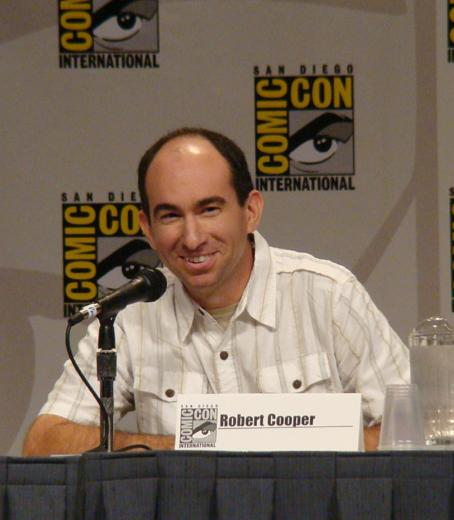
Cooper, writer and executive producer for the show with Wright

For "Rising", the Pemberton Glacier in British Columbia doubled for Antarctica during the opening flying sequence. Simon, Elizabeth's fiancé in "Rising" and "Home", was played by Garwin Sanford, who had previously played Narim on Stargate SG-1. Mario Azzopardi makes his return to the Stargate franchise in "Thirty-Eight Minutes". He had the distinctive honor of directing the pilot episode of Stargate SG-1, "Children of the Gods." This is his first time directing an episode of the franchise since the Season 1 Episode "Cor-Ai." Mario Azzopardi (as of December 2006) has only directed Season 1 Episodes of both SG-1 and Atlantis. "Thirty-Eight Minutes" is the only episode in both SG-1 and Atlantis to actually occur in real-time; between the opening of the Stargate and the resolution, 38 minutes of screentime do occur. Courtenay J. Stevens, who appears in "Childhood's End", had originally played the role of Lieutenant Elliot in Stargate SG-1, appearing in the Season 5 episodes "Proving Ground", "Summit" and "Last Stand". Writer Martin Gero compared Ares in "Childhood's End" to a villain in The Incredibles. In the scene of the final confrontation with Major John Sheppard, he began "monologuing," which is a key feature of villains in the film. The dog that appeared in Dr. Weir's illusion in "Home" is actually owned by actress Torri Higginson who plays her.

Michael Puttonen, who played Smeadon in "The Storm", first appeared in the second season of Stargate SG-1 as Simian, the blind prisoner in the episode "Prisoners." "The Defiant One" was filmed at the Richmond sand dunes. Richard Ian Cox, who appeared in "The Defiant One", previously appeared in the season 3 Stargate SG-1 episode "New Ground" as Nyan. "Letters from Pegasus" is the first clip show episode of Stargate Atlantis. The title of this episode was inspired by the 1987 PBS TV documentary Dear America: Letters Home from Vietnam. This was Samantha Carter's first appearance on Stargate Atlantis. At the end of the episode, she and Sergeant Harriman were briefly shown at Stargate Command (SGC) when they received the data burst from Atlantis. A deleted scene from Part two of "The Siege" showed Sora being returned to the Genii as part of their deal for the nuclear weapons, but this was cut due to time constraints; so it is unclear if the event occurred or if Sora may still be being held.

== Release and reception ==
"Rising" was the strongest episode to date gaining a 3.2 on the Nielsen ratings. "The Brotherhood" received ratings of 2.3 when it initially aired on Sci Fi. The worst rated episode in the season was "Home", which received a 1.7 rating. John Sinnott from DVDTalk called season one a "very good spinoff," certifying it "highly recommended." Dan Heaton from Digitally Obsessed was positive to the first season, and said the pilot started "in fashion." Reviewer Dan Phelps from DVDFanatic gave the series "thumbs up" and gave the series an A−.

"Rising" was nominated for a Leo Award in the category "Dramatic Series: Best Production Design". "Childhood's End" was one of only two Stargate franchise episodes (with "Poisoning the Well") directed by Sci-Fi veteran David Winning. It won three international awards for directing; New York, Chicago and Houston. For "Poisoning The Well", Paul McGillion and David Nykl were nominated for a Leo Award in the category "Dramatic Series: Best Supporting Performance by a Male", and Allison Hossack was nominated for a Leo Award in the category "Dramatic Series: Best Supporting Performance by a Female". "The Storm" was nominated for a Leo Award in the category "Dramatic Series: Best Overall Sound". "The Eye" was nominated for a Gemini Award in the category "Best Visual Effects", was nominated for a Leo Award in the category "Dramatic Series: Best Picture Editing", and won a Leo Award in the category "Dramatic Series: Best Visual Effects". For "The Defiant One", director Peter DeLuise was nominated for a Leo Award in the category "Dramatic Series: Best Direction" and in the category "Dramatic Series: Best Screenwriting". "Before I Sleep" was nominated for a Gemini Award in the category "Best Achievement in Make-Up". For "The Brotherhood", writer Martin Gero was nominated for a Gemini Award in the category "Best Writing in a Dramatic Series".

=== Cultural references ===
"The Defiant One" is the first time Rodney McKay refers to John Sheppard as "Captain Kirk" which is a recurring joke in the series. It refers to Sheppard's protective nature to the puddle jumpers and his tendency to pick up alien women. In the continuing list of references in Stargate to The Wizard of Oz, McKay mentions in "Sanctuary" to "Pay no attention to the man behind the curtain", a reference to the Emerald Wizard of the story. He also compares Sheppard's actions with Chaya to Captain Kirk, continuing the links between Stargate and Star Trek.
