= Erica Luttrell =

Canadian actress

- Occupation: Actress
- Years active: 1991–present
- Spouse: Jessica Mallers (m. 2019)
- Relatives: Rachel Luttrell (sister)
- Website: www.ericaluttrell.com

Erica Luttrell is a Canadian actress. She is known for playing Kara Cupper on Shining Time Station and Emelie Robeson on The New Ghostwriter Mysteries, and voicing Keesha Franklin in The Magic School Bus, Sapphire in Steven Universe, and Candy in Dave the Barbarian.

== Career ==
She began her acting career at age 2 in several Pampers and Cadillac commercials. At age 9, she had her first starring role in a television series called Shining Time Station. Her older sister Rachel Luttrell is also an actress who is best known for her role as Teyla Emmagan in the science fiction television series Stargate Atlantis.

Luttrell is best known for her role as Kara Cupper on the children's television series Shining Time Station, and the voice of Keesha Franklin on The Magic School Bus. In 1997, she starred as Emelie Robeson on The New Ghostwriter Mysteries. After several seasons of those and other TV series, she moved south to Los Angeles, California. In 2004, Luttrell was the voice of Candy on the short-lived Disney Channel animated series Dave the Barbarian. She also voices Sapphire in the Cartoon Network series Steven Universe, Glori in Mighty Magiswords and Emily Kaldwin in the 2016 video game Dishonored 2, Cheetah in the 2017 fighting video game Injustice 2, as well as Bangalore in Apex Legends. She also starred in the CBS sci-fi drama Salvation.

== Personal life ==
Luttrell was born to a Tanzanian/African mother and a white American father. Luttrell is the youngest of four sisters. Because of mixed-language, she can speak some French and Swahili. She identifies as homoromantic demi-pansexual and gay. In August 2019, Luttrell married her wife Jessica Mallers. Luttrell is the younger sister of actress Rachel Luttrell.

== Filmography ==
Year(s)	Film or television title	Character	Notes
1991–1995	Shining Time Station	Kara Cupper	Main role
1991–1995	Bookmice	Alysha	Voice
1994–1997	The Magic School Bus	Keesha Franklin	Voice
1995–1996	Goosebumps	Kim/Drew Brockman	Episodes: "Piano Lessons Can Be Murder", "Attack of the Jack-O'-Lanterns"
1997	The New Ghostwriter Mysteries	Emilie	13 episodes
1997	Honey, We Shrunk Ourselves	Jody	
1999	The Jersey	Taylor	Episode: "Ouch"
2000	Buffy the Vampire Slayer	Karen	Episode: "Superstar"
2004–2005	Dave the Barbarian	Princess Candy, Queen Glimia, Dinky, Big Hair Gal, Filthy Pixie, Shoppin' Gal, Cute Li'l Girl, Barbarian Woman, A Woman	Voice
2004–2006	As Told by Ginger	Simone	Voice
2006	Dexter	Library Aide	Episode: "Truth Be Told"
2007	El Tigre: The Adventures of Manny Rivera	Cosmic Cleopatra	Episode: "Crouching Tigre, Hidden Dragon"
2008	Random! Cartoons	Norah "Sailor Bird" Chickenvolt	Voice; MooBeard the Cow Pirate
2009	Private Practice	Sasha	Episode: "Wait and See"
2009	The Secret Saturdays	Sita	Episode: "Something in the Water"
2012	Lost Girl	Val Santiago	Episodes: "The Girl Who Fae'd With Fire" and "Flesh and Blood"
2014	JLA Adventures: Trapped in Time	Cheetah, Martha Kent	Voice
2015–2019	Steven Universe	Sapphire, Padparadscha and Cluster	Voice
2016	Avengers Assemble	Aneka, Female Warrior #1	Episode: "Panther's Rage"
2016–2019	The Lion Guard	Lioness / Boboka	Voice; Episodes: "Lions of the Outlands" / "Beshte and the Hippo Lanes" / "Pride Landers Unite!"
2016	Mighty Magiswords	Glori and Cheerleader Cat	Voice; "Biggest Fan", "School's In, Oh Bummer", "Quest For Knowledge"
2016	Arrow	Dr. Laura Washington/Cyberwoman	Episode: "Invasion!"
2017	Justice League Action	Doctor Fate (young)	Episode: "Trick or Threat"
2017–2018	Salvation	Claire Rayburn	Series Regular
2017–2018	Voltron: Legendary Defender	Acxa	Voice; main role (season 3 - season 8)
2018	The Death of Superman	Mercy Graves	Voice
2018	Westworld	New Mother	Episodes: "Phase Space" and "The Passenger"
2018	Magnum P.I.	Allie Mahelona	Episode: "Six Paintings, One Frame"
2018–2020	The Epic Tales of Captain Underpants	Erica Wang, Lacey Bootstrap	Voice
2019	Reign of the Supermen	Mercy Graves	Voice
2019	SEAL Team	Ronnie	Episode: "Rock Bottom"
2019	Steven Universe: The Movie	Sapphire	Voice
2019–2020	Steven Universe Future	Sapphire	Voice; 3 episodes
2020	Adventure Time: Distant Lands	Elise	Voice; Episode: "Obsidian"
2021	Batman: Soul of the Dragon	Silver St. Cloud	Voice
2021, 2024–present	Helluva Boss	Agent Two	Voice; Episode: "Truth Seekers"
2022	9-1-1	Bailey	Episode: "Dumb Luck"
2022–2023	Mayans M.C.	Rae	Recurring role; 7 episodes
2023	Adventure Time: Fionna and Cake	Hana Abadeer	Voice; Episode: "The Star"
2023–present	Castlevania: Nocturne	Esther	Voice; 2 episodes
2025–present	Your Friendly Neighborhood Spider-Man	Asha, Emma, Mrs. Lincoln	Voice; 2 episodes
2025	Tomb Raider: The Legend of Lara Croft	Kehinde, Ireti, Additional Voices	Voice; 3 episodes

=== Video games ===
Year(s)	Video game	Character	Notes
2009	Dragon Age: Origins	The Warden ("mystical" human female voice set)	Voice
2012	Diablo III	Witch Doctor (Female)	Voice
2014	Lego Batman 3: Beyond Gotham	Bleez, Barbara Ann Minerva / Cheetah, Dr. Doris Zeul / Giganta	Voice
2015	Lego Jurassic World	Additional Voices	Voice
2015	Fallout 4	Darla, Fahrenheit, Kendra	Voice
2016	Star Ocean: Integrity and Faithlessness	Anne	Voice
2016	Dishonored 2	Emily Kaldwin	Voice
2016	Marvel Heroes	Kamala Khan / Ms. Marvel	Voice
2017	Injustice 2	Barbara Ann Minerva / Cheetah	Voice
2017	XCOM 2: War of the Chosen	Soldier / Additional Voices	Voice
2017	Agents of Mayhem	Pride Trooper, Pride Technician	Voice
2018	Lego DC Super-Villains	Barbara Ann Minerva / Cheetah	Voice
2018	Spider-Man	Additional Voices	Voice
2019	Apex Legends	Bangalore ("Anita Williams")	Voice
2019	Harry Potter: Wizards Unite	Hermione Granger	Voice
2020	Final Fantasy VII Remake	Ms. Folia	Voice
2020	Fallout 76: Wastelanders	Rocksy, Settler Wanderer	Voice
2020	The Last of Us Part II	WLF Soldier	Voice
2020	Star Wars: Squadrons	Grace Sienar	Voice
2020	Twin Mirror	Anna	Voice
2020	Call of Duty: Black Ops Cold War and Call of Duty: Warzone	Jada Powers	Voice
2021	Marvel's Avengers	Shuri (Aja-Adanna)	Voice
2022	Horizon Forbidden West	Zo	Voice
2023	Call of Duty: Modern Warfare III	Eyitayo "Ripper" Davies	Voice
2025	Date Everything!	Nightmare	Voice
2025	Borderlands 4	Levaine	Voice
2025	Battlefield 6	Melissa Mills	Voice and likeness
2026	Order of the Sinking Star	The Sailor	Voice
2026	Star Wars: Zero Company	Hawks (Female)	Voice
