= Rising (Stargate Atlantis) =

- Stargate Atlantis episodes
- John Sheppard arrives in Atlantis
- Episode nos.: Season 1 Episodes 1 & 2
- Directed by: Martin Wood
- Written by: Robert C. Cooper and Brad Wright
- Production codes: 101 and 102
- Original air date: July 16, 2004
- Running time: 43min (each episode); 86min (put together)

Guest appearances
- Robert Patrick as Marshall Sumner; Richard Dean Anderson as Jack O'Neill; Michael Shanks as Daniel Jackson; Ona Grauer as Ayiana; Paul McGillion as Carson Beckett; Craig Veroni as Peter Grodin; Garwin Sanford as Simon; Christopher Heyerdahl as Halling; Dan Shea as Siler; Reece Thompson as Jinto; Dean Marshall as Bates; Andee Frizzell as The Keeper

Episode chronology
← Previous "New Order (Stargate SG-1)"	Next → "Hide and Seek"
- Stargate Atlantis (season 1)

"Rising" is the pilot episode for season one of the military science fiction television series Stargate Atlantis, a Canadian-American spin off series of Stargate SG-1. The episode was written by executive producers Brad Wright and Robert C. Cooper, and directed by Martin Wood. The episode was the strongest episode of the whole series on Nielsen household ratings. The episode got strong reviews from major media publishers worldwide.

"Rising" is about the establishment of the Atlantis expedition, it follows Major John Sheppard (Joe Flanigan) and Colonel Marshall Sumner (Robert Patrick) and their mission to the Pegasus Galaxy in part one. The second part is about the awakening of the Wraith and freeing prisoners of war from them. The pilot has various guest stars from Stargate SG-1 as for example Jack O'Neill (Richard Dean Anderson) and Siler (Dan Shea) among others.

== Plot ==
=== Part 1 ===
The technologically advanced Ancient race from Stargate SG-1 series voyaged to the Pegasus Galaxy from Earth via a colossal starship to spread new life. The city of Atlantis served as a maneuvering station as well as a base of operations. Their mission was unsuccessful and they met a terrible new enemy called the Wraith, the Ancients lost the war with the Wraith and after a long siege Atlantis was submerged under the ocean.

Discovering evidence of the Ancients journey to another galaxy, a large team of scientists and military personnel, led by diplomat Elizabeth Weir (Torri Higginson) examine residual technology in an Antarctic outpost with hopes to travel to Atlantis, thereby discovering any knowledge left behind and unraveling the mystery of the abrupt disappearance of its citizens. With the assistance of Daniel Jackson (Michael Shanks) and Jack O'Neill (Richard Dean Anderson) they are able to travel to Atlantis through the Stargate.

Using an Ancient power resource known as the Zero Point Module (ZPM) to supply the energy essential for the unusually extended wormhole, an assembly of volunteer representatives from many different countries joins the Atlantis expedition under the command of Colonel Marshall Sumner (Robert Patrick) of the United States Marine Corps. Shortly after crossing, Dr. Rodney McKay (David Hewlett) determines that because of the immediate depletion of power due to their arrival, the shield protecting the city from the ocean water, will imminently collapse. Without enough energy to return to Earth, a squadron including Colonel Sumner, Major John Sheppard (Joe Flanigan), and Lieutenant Aiden Ford (Rainbow Sun Francks) travels to a random planet for help. The local villagers, led by Teyla Emmagan (Rachel Luttrell), are permitted to breed for generations before being systematically harvested by the Wraith. They assist the strangers, but as Colonel Sumner arranges an exploration of a vacant Ancient settlement, three Wraith starships travel through the Athosian Stargate to begin herding the planet’s human inhabitants.

=== Part 2 ===
The Wraith starships head toward the village and start attacking. The military personnel start attacking the starships, but are eventually outmaneuvered by the Wraith. Back in Atlantis the shield is getting weaker and the remaining personnel there receive immediate orders to evacuate. Before they are able to press the gate address John Sheppard and the Athosian villagers come through the Stargate. When the shield fails, rather than taking on water, the city rises to the ocean surface. The captured military personnel and Athosian villagers wake up in a Wraith cell, three Wraith start taking out prisoners from the cell, one at the time. After tracking where the Wraith hideout is, Rodney McKay reveals to Sheppard that they can use one of the Ancient spaceships, dubbed "Puddle Jumper" by Sheppard, to get there. In the meantime, Carson Beckett shows Elizabeth Weir what he found out about the Wraith DNA.

Weir authorizes the rescue mission led by Sheppard, and he assembles a team together with Aiden Ford, to go through the Stargate. After leaving the Spacegate (a Stargate placed in Space, or in Orbit around a planet) on the other side, they eventually find the location of the Wraith base on the planet below. Meanwhile, Marshall Sumner is confronted by a Wraith woman (The Keeper). She tells him about their race and then uses her telepathic abilities to find out about Earth which she hopes to use as a new feeding ground for the Wraith. In the meantime Sheppard and Ford infiltrate the Wraith base and trying to locate the survivors from the Wraith attack. They split up, and Sheppard finds Sumner and the Keeper. The Keeper begins to feed on Sumner, and Sheppard shoots him, after witnessing his suffering. After Ford locates and saves the others survivors, he saves Sheppard from being fed upon by the Keeper. Sheppard kills her, but she tells him with her dying breath, that he has awoken them all. Sheppard and Ford witness the Wraith awakening from their hibernation pods, and decide to leave.

The remaining soldiers, protecting the Jumper outside the base are attacked by Wraith Darts. The team is able to escape the planet with the Jumper, but is held up by Wraith Darts blockading the Spacegate. Sheppard eventually manages to maneuver the Jumper to the gate. Back in Atlantis Sheppard, Ford and Weir talk about the situation with the Wraith and Sheppard apologizes because he hasn't made them many friends. However, Weir then shows him the Athosians, and Teyla Emmagan agrees with her, since they will help them find more friends. While the expedition celebrates their arrival in Atlantis, Weir asks Sheppard which members he wants in his team, since they have to go out there to fight the Wraith.

== Production ==
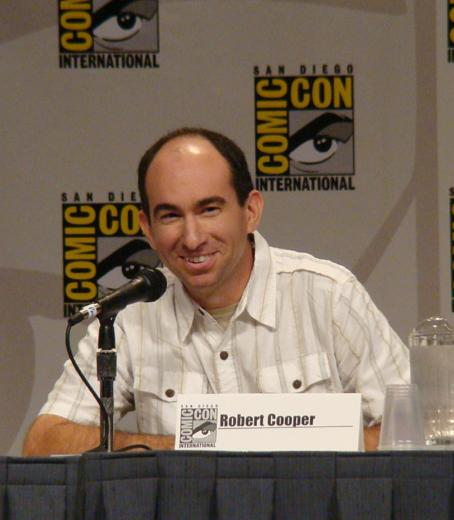
Cooper, writer and executive producer for the show with Wright

The pilot episode, "Rising (Parts 1 and 2)" was written by Robert C. Cooper and Brad Wright, and directed by Martin Wood. The Pemberton Glacier in British Columbia doubles for Antarctica during the opening flying sequence. The Antarctic scenes in the start of the episode was filmed in Vancouver, British Columbia, Canada. The budget for the two-part episode was estimated around $5 million US dollars. Rodney McKay was actually supposed to be African-Canadian under the name Dr. Benjamin Ingram, but when the producers hired Rainbow Sun Francks to the play the young tactical genius, they approached David Hewlett to audition for the role. The producers eventually came to a solution where Ingram would be replaced by McKay from the former Stargate SG-1 series. The character Teyla Emmagan was originally named "Mikala" in the early drafts of the Stargate Atlantis script. At the end of February, Metro-Goldwyn-Mayer (MGM) announced the inclusion of Robert Patrick's character Marshall Sumner. The official announcement said that he would only be featured in part one, but was later extended to both parts one and two. In January 2004 the Stargate producers announced including Jack O'Neill (portrayed by Richard Dean Anderson) and Daniel Jackson (portrayed by Michael Shanks) in the two-hour premiere pilot episode to make it easier for fans to relate to.

Stargate Atlantis was supposed to be set on present day Earth, after Stargate SG-1 was canceled. This cancelation of SG-1 didn't happen and Stargate Atlantis was released while Stargate SG-1 was still airing, so the story arc was set in a new galaxy under the name, Pegasus. The story was set in another galaxy so the two running series would not collide with each other and to stop plot interferences.

== Reception ==
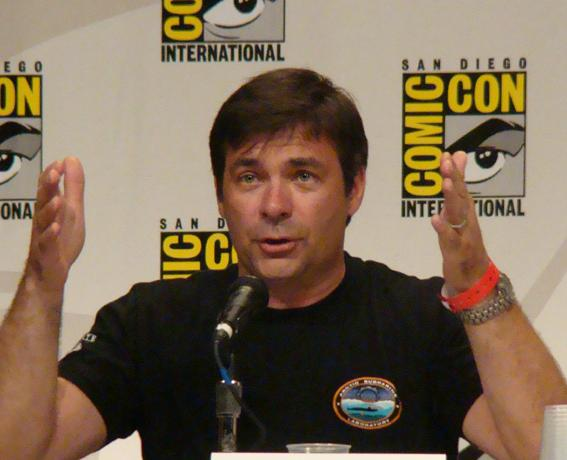
Director Martin Wood at Comic Con 2007

"Rising" is Stargate Atlantis strongest episode of the series, with a 3.2 on the Nielsen ratings. The episode was the most watched episode ever broadcast by Sci Fi Channel gathering over 4 million viewers in the United States according to Variety in 2004, but was beaten by Warehouse 13 in 2009. In the United Kingdom, it was viewed by 1.28 million people, placing it first in the most viewed shows in Sky One for the week. The two-part pilot episode was released on DVD after its initial broadcast on TV. The pilot episode was awarded a Gemini Award in the category Best Visual Effects. The episode was also nominated for an Emmy Award for "Outstanding Special Visual Effects for a Series", a Leo Award for "Best Production Design in a Dramatic Series", and a Visual Effects Society Award for "Outstanding Visual Effects in a Broadcast Series". The original and first release date of "Rising (Part 1)" was on July 16, 2004 and was released internationally on September 19, 2005. "Rising (Part 2)" was released at the same time as Part 1 in the United States, but was released internationally on September 26, 2006.

David Nusair from Reel Film Reviews said "as a pilot episode, there's no denying that "Rising" gets the job done." IGN reviewer Filip Vukcevic gave the episode, 6 out of 10 and said "while this pilot does have promise, it doesn't appear to deliver anything but average sci-fi fare. Hopefully the series itself has more spice." Dan Heaton from Digitally Obsessed said "Rising provides a strong introduction to an original series that retains the positive aspects of its predecessor but does not simply copy its success," and gave the episode an A. Taylor Brown when reviewing the Rising (Part 1) from GateWorld said "as a pilot episode, "Rising" gives viewers a lot of hope for the series to come," the episode was given 4 out of 5 stars. Virginia Heffernan from The New York Times called the episode "Dull" and further commented that it was a "relic of our own unenlightened time," but said that the show could win fans with its "Lavish special effects".
