= Lost City (Stargate SG-1) =

- Stargate SG-1 episodes
- Episode nos.: Season 7 Episodes 21 & 22
- Directed by: Martin Wood
- Written by: Brad Wright and Robert C. Cooper
- Cinematography by: Jim Menard
- Editing by: Brad Rines
- Production code: P261
- Original air dates: October 12, 2003; October 19, 2003
- Running time: 82 minutes

Guest appearances
- William Devane as Henry Hayes; Jessica Steen as Elizabeth Weir; Tony Amendola as Bra'tac; David Palffy as Anubis; Gary Jones as Walter Harriman; Ronny Cox as Robert Kinsey; Michael Adamthwaite as Herak; James McDaniel as General Francis Maynard; John P. Jumper as himself

Episode chronology
← Previous "Inauguration"	Next → "New Order"
- Stargate SG-1 (season 7)

"Lost City" is the two-part finale to the seventh season of the science fiction television show Stargate SG-1. The episode was written by Brad Wright and Robert C. Cooper, with Martin Wood directing. The first part originally premiered on October 2, 2003, with the second part showing a week later on October 9, 2003 on Sky One in the United Kingdom. SciFi Channel in the United States then aired part one on October 12, 2003 and part two on October 19, 2003.

"Lost City" was originally conceived as a Stargate SG-1 feature film, with Brad Wright and Robert C. Cooper first discussing the project in 2001. As it developed, it was reimagined as a finale to Stargate SG-1 and the beginning of spin-off series Stargate Atlantis. Ultimately, with the knowledge that SG-1 would return for an eighth season, the story was shaped into both a season seven finale as well as informing parts of the Atlantis pilot, "Rising".

The episode had the largest budget since SG-1's pilot, "Children of the Gods". Guest stars including William Devane as President Henry Hayes and James McDaniel as General Francis Maynard returned, having first appeared in previous lead-in episode "Inauguration". Frequent guest stars Ronny Cox and Tony Amendola also returned, as Robert Kinsey and Bra'tac, respectively. Jessica Steen was introduced as Dr. Elizabeth Weir, who would later become one of the lead characters in spin-off Stargate Atlantis played by Torri Higginson. Real world Air Force Chief of Staff John P. Jumper also appeared as himself. This episode was nominated for Emmy, Gemini, and Visual Effects Society awards.

== Plot ==
=== Part 1 ===
Racing against the forces of Anubis, SG-1 travel through the Stargate to an alien world which they know is home to a Repository of the Ancients Knowledge. As the team debate whether one of them should use the device or if they should simply destroy it in order to prevent Anubis from taking the device for himself, his forces arrive and begin their attack. Jack O'Neill (Richard Dean Anderson), who years before was nearly killed by the overwhelming amount of knowledge after accidentally using an identical device, decides he should be the one to use it, in the hope it will help them defend Earth.

In Washington, D.C., new President Henry Hayes (William Devane) calls upon Dr. Elizabeth Weir (Jessica Steen), an expert in international politics, to replace General Hammond (Don S. Davis) for a three-month review. Vice President Robert Kinsey (Ronny Cox) approaches Weir, expressing in no uncertain terms the undesirability of interfering with his agenda.

As SG-1 retreat back to Earth, General Hammond tells them that he is being replaced. Dr. Weir arrives to a less than happy reception as she ceases all Stargate operations. Not long after, Teal'c's mentor Bra'tac (Tony Amendola) comes through the Stargate with the news that Anubis' fleet will arrive at Earth in three days. Kinsey believes this to be a ploy to keep the SGC running, but Weir hears out SG-1's proposal to find the Lost City of the Ancients, and with it the means to defend Earth. Bra'tac and Teal'c depart for Chulak, to find ships and warriors to aid in Earth's defense.

=== Part 2 ===
O'Neill, under the influence of Ancient knowledge, writes down what Daniel believes is the location of the Lost City: Praclarush Taonas. Daniel realizes that there is a syllable in the Ancient language for each Stargate symbol, and thus "Praclarush Taonas" is a Stargate address. Unable to make a Stargate connection to Praclarush Taonas, Sam (Amanda Tapping) instead plots the planet's location and SG-1 sets off in a Goa'uld cargo ship along with Bra'tac and a young Jaffa pilot named Ronan. Jack's condition is worsening; his actions are becoming more and more subconscious, and he is losing the ability to communicate. He gives command of the mission to Carter. They arrive at a molten planet and discover Taonas, an Ancient outpost, buried under hardened lava. O'Neill activates a hologram showing Terra Atlantus—Earth and the Lost City of Atlantis, buried in Antarctica. O'Neill removes an advanced power source from the outpost. In orbit, Bra'tac fights and successfully kills Ronan, who was not a Rebel Jaffa but actually an agent working for Anubis. During the fight, Bra'tac is wounded; O'Neill heals him using the healing powers of the Ancients, then enhances the cargo ship's hyperdrive and modifies its ring transporter to be able to melt through the ice upon reaching their destination at Antarctica.

Anubis' scouts reach Earth, but General Hammond and President Hayes believe he is attempting to probe Earth's status and hold back launching their only defense, the Prometheus. As Anubis' full force arrive in orbit, they destroy a fleet of US Navy ships, before turning their attention to Earth's communications network. Anubis appears as a hologram inside the Oval Office and demands Earth's surrender. Still at Stargate Command, Kinsey demands that Weir let him go through the Stargate to Earth's evacuation site, but Anubis dials in with a nuke (stopped only by the iris), thereby preventing his desertion. SG-1's cargo ship arrives above Antarctica and starts drilling; it is protected from a group of death gliders and Al'kesh by the Prometheus, commanded by General Hammond, and its complement of F-302 fighter craft. Once inside the Ancient facility, O'Neill installs the power source, while Daniel, Sam, and Teal'c fend off Anubis' Kull Warriors. As Hammond orders a kamikaze run on Anubis' flagship, O'Neill activates Ancient weapons that obliterate the Goa'uld fleet. A drained O'Neill indicates an Ancient stasis chamber; as it activates, he says "ave, amicis" ("goodbye, friends"). Sam is determined to save him, while Daniel realizes they are in just another outpost, not the Lost City itself. Teal'c wonders where Atlantis is as the three of them look upon the frozen O'Neill.

== Production ==
=== Development ===
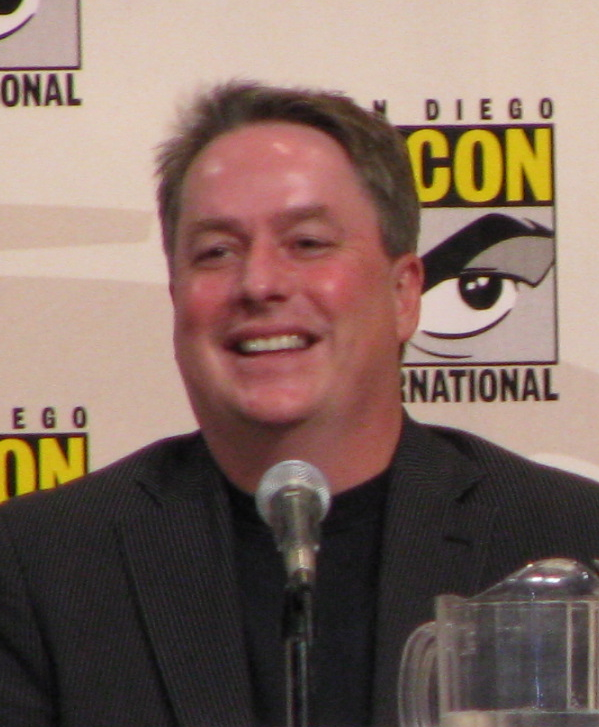
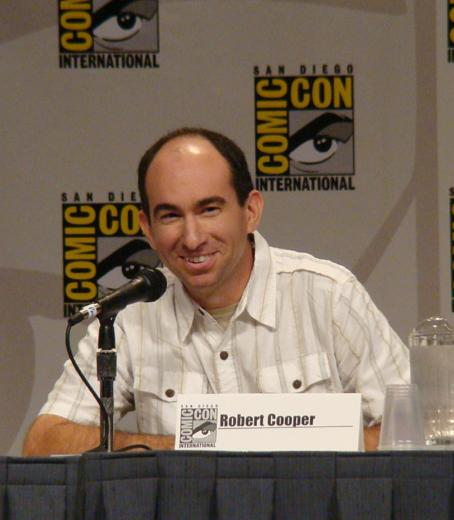
"Lost City" was first imagined in 2001 by showrunners Brad Wright and Robert C. Cooper as a Stargate feature film which would bridge the end of Stargate SG-1 begin a spin-off series, Stargate Atlantis, before being reworked a number of times.

Brad Wright began discussing plans for a Stargate SG-1 feature film and spinoff series in September 2001. In February 2002, he elaborated that Robert C. Cooper was writing the script with him, with the intent to present it to MGM. Wright also revealed that Daniel Jackson (Michael Shanks), who at that point had left the show was included in the story. In June 2002, Wright revealed that they had submitted their first draft of the script and that the feature film would bridge the end of SG-1 and a new spinoff series called Stargate Atlantis. Later that year, Richard Dean Anderson noted that MGM had instead decided to pursue a sixth season of SG-1, with the hope that it would raise both the interest and capital to produce the feature film. Anderson, who was further reducing his working days on SG-1 also conveyed his interest in being a part of the feature film.

As well as setting up the Atlantis spinoff, Cooper wanted the feature to conclude SG-1, completing their search for the Lost City of the Ancients, which had been introduced the season prior, as well as wrapping up the Anubis arc and revealing the Stargate program to the public. Believing season 7 would be the shows last, the feature film script was later adapted into a finale of SG-1, but after the Sci-Fi Channel and MGM renewed SG-1 for an eight-season which would run simultaneously with Stargate Atlantis, Wright and Cooper decided to adapt their script once more into a two-part season 7 finale as they felt they could not postpone concluding the Anubis arc for another year. There were originally discussions as to whether the season finale might be presented as a complete two-hour piece, or a television movie, although ultimately Sci Fi decided to split the story into two parts.

Wright and Cooper's original, far longer feature script was 120 pages, which meant reducing it to fit within the two hour slot. Revealing the Stargate program to the public of Earth was one of the most significant redactions to the story. There was also originally a greater emphasis on SG-1's search for a ship which could take them to the Ancient Outpost planet, giving the character Jaffa double agent, Ronan a significant role. The original film also featured a huge action sequence involving Anubis' forces attacking and destroying the United States Seventh Fleet, which was reduced to just a phone call in the final script. The romance arc of Samantha Carter and Jack O'Neill would have also played a more significant part, with Cooper and Wood teasing that there would have been a kiss between the two on board the Goa'uld cargo ship after O'Neill puts Carter in command. Other elements that would have introduced the lost city of Atlantis on Earth were altered, with some elements instead forming the Atlantis pilot "Rising". Both the feature film and earlier version of the television script would have featured an action sequence involving SG-1 parachuting from the Cargo ship in Antarctica to reach the Ancient outpost below. The writers and producers kept this the sequence in the script until one of the final drafts, but ultimately had to cut it due to the cost. The final version of the script was reduced from 120 pages to 108.

After completing the script, Cooper and Wright decided that in order to put as much money and time into the episode as they could, there would be a clip show prior to "Lost City". Entitled "Inauguration", Joseph Mallozzi & Paul Mullie put together the teleplay, recapping the event that lead to "Lost City", as well as introducing William Devane's newly elected President Henry Hayes.

=== Cast ===
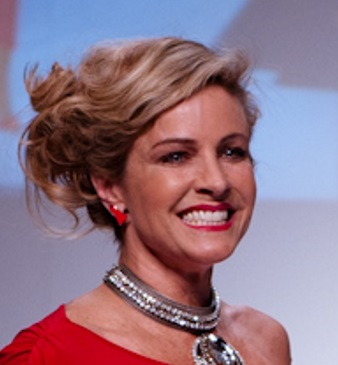
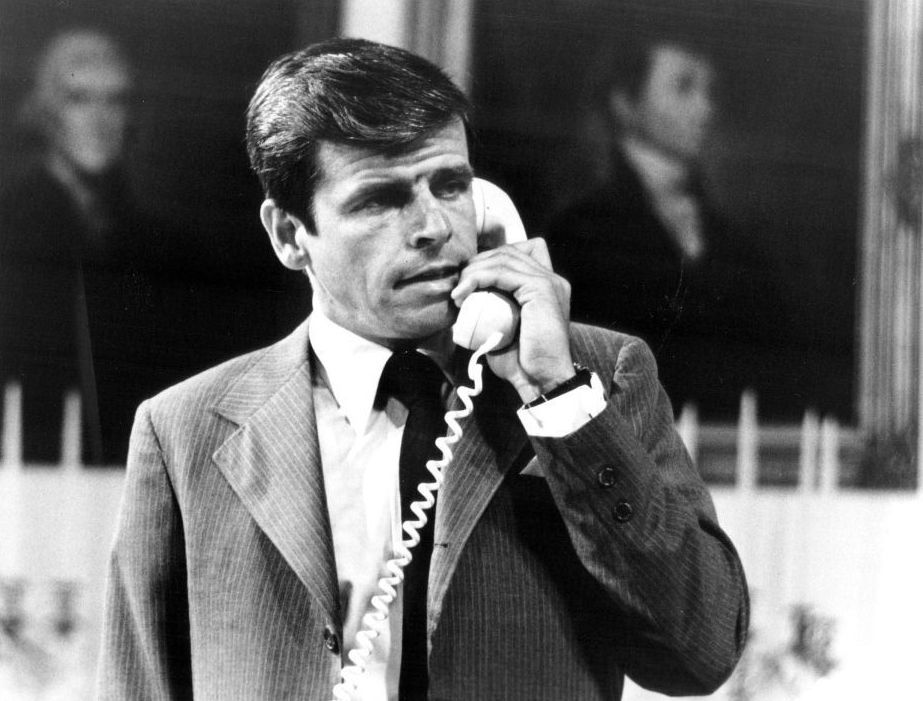
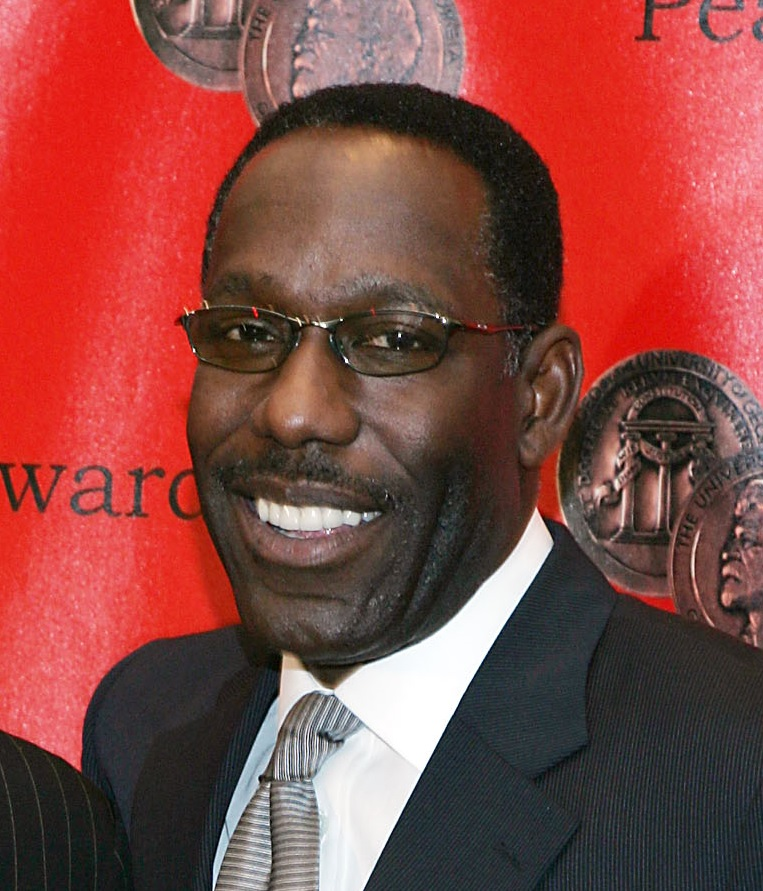
The episode guest stars include Jessica Steen as Dr. Elizabeth Weir, William Devane as the newly elected President of the United States and James McDaniel as General Frances Maynard.

William Devane, who had made his first appearance in the episode prior, returns as the newly elected President Henry Hayes, with James McDaniel also returning from the previous instalment as General Francis Maynard.

Jessica Steen was cast in the role of Dr. Elizabeth Weir, a role that the producers intended to carry over to the upcoming spinoff series, Stargate Atlantis. Cooper commented that he found it challenging writing Weir's character, as she was an antagonist in the story, "dethroning Hammond, and threatening the role of SG-1", but they wanted her to be a character that the audience would ultimately embrace and want to see in the spin-off series. Steen hadn't seen any of SG-1 prior to auditioning and being cast in the show, feeling it would best serve her performance to learn about the mythology of the series as her character did within the story. Anticipating the character becoming one of the leads in the Atlantis spinoff, Steen had a lot of questions for the writers and producers during filming, as she wanted to best understand what direction the character was heading in order to inform her performance. Steen later felt as though she must have "drove the writers, producers bannanas, to a not good degree" with her questions as she was such a "stickler for detail". In Steen's contract, an end date for filming the episode had also been set, as Steen was attending and producing a themed camp at Burning Man festival, with family. Steen was advised by her management to leave out the detail of it being for Burning Man, due to the stigma attached to attending the event. Whilst on set, Steen commented that in her excitement and ease in getting to know the cast and crew, she told people she was going to Burning Man, something she'd done every year since 1998. After completing filming, Steen was under contract from Stargate SG-1 not to take on work whilst casting and development for Atlantis was underway and in fall 2003, Steen was let go without explanation. Sometime later, Steen recalled meeting with SG-1 producer N. John Smith who explained to her how the shows producers were worried about casting someone potentially "committed to naked drugging in the desert" at Burning Man and how that might interfere with a permanent role on Stargate Atlantis. Steen commented that she was hurt and felt misunderstood by the shows producers, whilst recalled that Smith and the shows producers regretted how the situation had been handled. Ultimately the character was recast, with Torri Higginson portraying the character on subsequent appearances in SG-1 and spinoff, Atlantis.

The then real world Air Force Chief of Staff, General John P. Jumper was asked to appear in the episode. Jumper had originally been slated to appear the season prior, after taking over the role from Michael E. Ryan who had also appeared on the show, but was unable to make it to Vancouver due to the Iraq War. Originally appearing in three scenes set in The White House, Jumper was given additional scenes and dialog by the producers. Because of his position, Jumper was not paid for his role, with Air Force film coordinator Doug Thar remarking that Jumper had "a great time", joking that "he's not going to give up his day job". Members of the cast and crew were invited to dinner with Jumper and his wife during their stay in Vancouver.

This episode is Don S. Davis' final appearance as a member of the main cast. Having portrayed General George Hammond since the shows inception, Davis felt it was time to move on, remarking that the "story line has made this the perfect opportunity for me to go away". Despite announcing his impending departure in late 2003, Davis did say that he was open to returning in a reduced capacity, "I love the show, I love my fellow actors, and the writers are excellent and if there's enough money, to put it grossly, certainly I'll come back".

Showrunner and writer Robert C. Cooper felt that Richard Dean Anderson really embraced his transformation in the episode. Cooper had previously written the season 2 episode "The Fifth Race", where, as with the premise of "Lost City", O'Neill has the repository of the Ancients downloaded into his brain. Cooper felt that Anderson didn't previously enjoy it and was very reluctant when it came to speaking the Ancient language, but this time he took it much further. Anderson praised the guest cast of the episode, commenting on Jessica Steen that she was "very nice and smart and snappy and I really enjoyed working with her", as well as noting the performances of Devane and Cox.

Anubis' commanding Jaffa, Her'ak played by Michael Adamthwaite makes his finale appearance on the show. Adamthwaite joked that he would skip to the end of the script every time he was asked to return to the role, anticipating that he would meet his demise. Reoccurring guest stars Tony Amendola, Ronny Cox, David Palffy, Gary Jones return for the episode, as Bra'tac, Vice President Robert Kinsey, Anubis, and Walter Harriman respectively. The shows long-time military consultant & advisor Ron Blecker made his first onscreen appearance as a member of the SG-3.

Sci-Fi Channel ran a "Get in the Gate" competition to appear as a background extra in the episode. Out of the 56,000 entrants, Bonnie Arbuthnot from Chicago won the role, appearing in scenes with Don S. Davis, James McDaniel & William Devane.

=== Filming ===
Filming for "Lost City" took place in August 2003. Like much of season 7, filming took place in a particularly disjointed, out-of-sequence manner in order to accommodate Richard Dean Anderson, who was only working three days a week. In order to feature Anderson as much possible in "Lost City" the production team saved up their "Rick days". The episode was the second-to-last episode to begin filming. Amanda Tapping shot her parts for "Lost City" over 16 days. At the same time, Tapping also had to begin work on the subsequent and final episode of the season, "Resurrection", which was her directorial debut.

Grass fields around Maple Ridge, British Columbia were used as the backdrop to the alien world which SG-1 travel to in search of an Ancient Repository of Knowledge. The scenes involved heavy use of gasoline mortar explosions to simulate attacking spaceships. British Columbia was experiencing uncharacteristically warm weather at the time, with an increase in wildfires, so to lessen the risk, Wray Douglas' effects team sprayed over 10,000 gallons of water onto the fields, with the Maple Ridge Fire Department on location and standing-by.

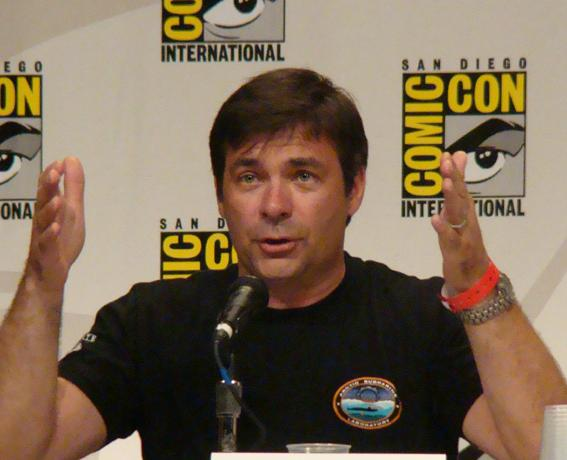
Frequent director of the show Martin Wood was responsible for the episode.

The White House Oval Office set was borrowed from the X-Men film X2 (2003), with the condition that the set could not be damaged. This caused director Martin Wood some limitations with shooting a scene where the shows villain, Anubis, appears as a hologram to the American President in the Oval Office, before being fired upon by Secret Service agents. Since they were not allowed to damage the room, a number of props were made to simulate gunfire, including a portrait. The scene was then further hampered when the technocrane broke prior to filming. Wood was ultimately unsatisfied with the finished scene as he felt Anubis wasn't imposing enough.

A set was constructed which would double as both the lava rock Ancient Outpost on a distant planet that SG-1 travels to and the ice covered Ancient Outpost on Earth. In order to give the illusion of Antarctic conditions, the set was constructed in a studio which could be refrigerated.

Stunt coordinator Dan Shea choreographed one of the key fight scenes between Tony Amendola's character Bra'tac and the Jaffa double agent Ronan, portrayed by Marc Worden. The fight was shot from multiple camera angles simultaneously, with Dan Shea operating one of the steadicams in order to best capture the movements of the actors. Due to running out of time, one of the scenes in the Stargate Command briefing room had to be shot with four cameras shooting simultaneously.

=== Post-production ===
The first cut of the episode was nineteen minutes over the required length. Most of the scenes that were shot were kept in, with Robert C. Cooper and Martin Wood mostly relying on trimming scenes down. One of the scenes that was entirely cut involved President Henry Hayes (William Devane) taping his address to the American people, revealing the impending Goa'uld attack and making the Stargate program public. Other scenes, such as the team drinking at O'Neill's house, a scene in the cafeteria, Bra-tac and Ronan's fight, and the build-up to Hammond taking Prometheus into battle were all trimmed down.

Show composer Joel Goldsmith had no additional time to create his score, completing the bulk of it in just two weeks. A number of the motifs in the episode were later drawn and expanded upon for Stargate Atlantis' score, which followed on from the events of "Lost City".

The volume of visual effects meant splitting the work between Rainmaker Digital Effects, Image Engine and GVFX. Digital effects supervisor Bruce Woloshyn described the episodes visual effects as being the biggest and most ambitious on Stargate SG-1 to date. Rainmaker and Image Engine collaborated on the Death Glider air assault scenes from the first part of "Lost City". Other sequences such as Anubis' super-soldiers killing Jaffa and later engaging SG-1, the lava Ancient Outpost planet, Anubis' face and the freezing of O'Neill were handled by Rainmaker. Image Engine were responsible for creating Antarctica and the battle between Earth's forces including Prometheus, the F-302 fighters and Anubis' fleet. GVFX created some of the smaller shots, such as the ring-transporters. The team at Rainmaker delivered their completed effects at the end of November 2003.

The cargo ship fight scene between Bra'tac and Ronan was originally supposed to lead to a visual effects sequence involving the out-of-control cargo Ship colliding with the dome structure on the planet. Due to the cost, this was scaled back, with the ring-transporter instead being responsible for destabilizing the dome on the planet, as opposed to the ship colliding with it.

== Release ==
=== Broadcast ===
Part 1 of "Lost City" first aired on October 2, 2003 in the United Kingdom on Sky One, with part 2 airing on the channel the following week on October 9, 2003. In the United Kingdom, both parts of "Lost City" came in as the second most popular broadcasts on Sky One that week, both behind new episodes of The Simpsons. Part 1 had an audience of approximately 920,000 viewers, making it Sky One's most watched broadcast of Stargate SG-1's seventh season, whilst part 2 had around 900,000, making it the channel's second most watched broadcast of the season.

In the United States, the Sci-Fi Channel broadcast part 1 on October 12, 2003, earning a 1.7 Neilsen household rating. Part 2 aired on March 19, 2003, earning a rating of 2.1, equating to approximately 2.56 million viewers which made it the second most watched episode of season seven broadcast on Sci-Fi Channel, beaten only by "Evolution" part 2, which broke ratings records for both the show and channel. In Canada, the channel Space first aired part 1 on January 27, 2005, with part 2 airing on February 3, 2005.

=== Reception ===
IGN wrote that whilst neither this episode or the series as a whole had the reputation for "presenting ground breaking science-fiction", viewers would find "an entertaining story with the usual humorous dialogue and rock steady performances that have been the show's trademark for 7 years". The performances of the guest casting, including Ronny Cox's Vice President Kinsey were also highlighted, with the reviewer writing describing him as "a great weasel of a character that you just can't wait until you see his butt get kicked". Darren Rea for Sci-fi Online called the episode "next best thing to having a theatrically released Stargate: SG1 movie", proclaiming it had the "best visual effects battles seen so far on SG-1". Rea also highlighted the presence of Richard Dean Anderson in the episode, commenting that his "unique sense of humour has been largely absent from this season", so welcomed him being in the entire duration of "Lost City".

On the production side, you can see why some previous episodes seem to have been saving money, for the effects here are so impressive - and therefore expensive. It's not the money that impresses, though, but the imagination and skill behind the imagery.

— Reviewer Jan Vincent-Rudzki for TV Zone

TV Zone's Jan Vincent-Rudzki positively received both parts of the episode, particularly what he called an "extraordinary second half". In the first part of the episode, Vincent-Rudzki was of the opinion that the scenes in O'Neill's house between SG-1 and Hammond "slows the episode's pace down", after what he called "a cracking start of political machinations and battles off-world", awarding 7 out of 10. Vincent-Rudzki considered the unresolved season-long arc, searching for the lost city of Atlantis to be "starting to wear a bit thin", although he otherwise applauded the second part writing "the 'wow' factor that the series has been missing too often this season is back, in force", awarding part 2 a full 10 out 10. Julia Houston for About.com called it "one of the best episodes in the past few seasons", comparing the teamwork dynamic to earlier seasons of the show.

Writing for fansite GateWorld, contributor Alli Snow enjoyed that the episode was "peppered with scenes that define the characters", specifically mentioning Richard Dean Anderson's Jack O'Neill, writing "at the close of another Jack-light season, it's refreshing to see him at his best". Snow did feel that O'Neill's ability to heal Bra'tac in part 2 felt "convenient -- one might even say contrived", as well as believing that "the threat posed to Earth by Anubis' fleet could have been more impressively depicted". The reviewer considered the visual effects to be especially impressive and considered Amanda Tapping's performance in the final scene to be "particularly heart-rending, poignant to say the least".

Writing for Tor.com, Keith R.A. DeCandido wrote that the episode would have been a "worthy series finale if they hadn't renewed it". Amy Walker for Set the Tape placed the episode 5th in her top 10 episodes of the shows 10 season run, writing "with some superb acting and some excellently choreographed action sequences ‘Lost City’ would have acted as a great conclusion to the show". Comet placed the episode 6th in their top 10 episodes of Stargate SG-1, describing the battle sequence as the best action sequence of the series 10-year run as well as highlighting Don S. Davis final appearance as a main character. Swapna Krishna for Syfy Wire included the episode in her list of the most significant episodes in the overarching Samantha Carter and Jack O'Neill relationship storyline.

In an analysis piece for PopMatters, Marco Lanzagorta wrote "in the season’s late episodes, “Heroes,” “Inauguration,” and the two-part “The Lost City,” a complex story arc concerns a nefarious Vice President (Ronny Cox), bent on using the Stargate and the war against the Goa’uld for his own financial gain". Lanzagorta argued that "the military tends to do right in SG-1", referring to General John P. Jumper's appearance, "here a firm supporter of the Stargate Command, underlining that this is the only TV series currently endorsed and supported by the Air Force".

=== Award nominations ===
The episode was nominated in the 56th Primetime Emmy Awards, for "Outstanding Special Visual Effects for a Series", but lost to the Star Trek: Enterprise episode "Countdown". In 2005, "Lost City" was nominated for "Best Visual Effects" in the 20th Gemini Award, with spin-off series Stargate Atlantis pilot episode "Rising" ultimately winning the award. Part 2 of "Lost City" was nominated in the 3rd annual Visual Effects Society's award in the "Outstanding Visual Effects in a Broadcast Series" category, but was beaten by the Star Trek: Enterprise episode "Storm Front".

=== Home media and streaming ===
"Lost City" was presented as a single 1 hour 22 minute feature for the DVD release. The episode was first released on DVD as the sole feature of "Volume 37" on June 28, 2004 in Region 2. The release includes commentary by Robert C. Cooper, Amanda Tapping and Martin Wood, with featurettes including "SG-1 Director's Series: Lost City with Martin Wood", "Behind the Scenes: Journey inside The Lost City" and a preview of Stargate Atlantis. It was then released as part of the complete Season 7 boxsets on October 19, 2004 in Region 1 and February 28, 2005 in Region 2.

"Lost City", split as two individual episodes, along with the rest of season 7 were first made available digitally in January 2008 through iTunes and Amazon Unbox. The episode, along with every other episode of the series, were made available to stream for the first time through Netflix in the USA on August 15, 2010.
