= Gerrit Kinkel =

Austrian composer (born 1984)

- Born: 27 December 1984 (age 41)
- Origin: Austria
- Genres: Film music Jingles; Trailers; Pop; Jazz; Classical
- Occupations: composer producer engineer performer
- Years active: 2008–present

Gerrit Kinkel (born 27 December 1984) is an Austrian composer, record producer, recording engineer and performer. He is the founder of Gerrit Kinkel Productions.

== Musical career and personal life ==
=== Early life and education ===
Gerrit was born in Bregenz and grew up in the countryside of Vorarlberg, Austria. At the age of four, he began to play trumpet. A principal in the Austrian Army Band, he entered the University of Music and Performing Arts in Vienna at the age of nineteen as a classical performer and Tonmeister.

In 2007 he was awarded an international scholarship from Berklee College of Music in Boston.

== Gerrit Kinkel Productions ==
In 2009, Kinkel founded Gerrit Kinkel Productions, a boutique music production company based in Los Angeles, California. It specializes in custom music creation and licensing for media and film as well as record production and engineering.

Gerrit Kinkel Productions just custom scored Google's new Emoji Ad. GKP's music and sound effects are a staple in a variety of trailers and motion picture advertising. Recent films include: Transformers: Age of Extinction, Captain America: The Winter Soldier, The Wolf of Wall Street, and more.

GKP collaborates on a variety of projects. Most recently American Idol Season 13 and Cher. Other artist collaborations include Sting, Chris Botti, Josh Groban, John Mayer, Arturo Sandoval, Matthew Morrison, Chris Mann, The Boston Pops, Rachel Luttrell and more.

== Awards ==
=== Music production and engineering ===
==== Grammy Awards ====
- 2013 – Best Large Jazz Ensemble Album (Arturo Sandoval - Dear Diz Everyday I Think of You) – Winner
- 2010 – Best Pop Instrumental Album (Chris Botti - Live in Boston) – Nominated

==== Latin Grammys ====
- 2012 – Best Engineered Album (Arturo Sandoval - Dear Diz Everyday I Think of You) – Winner
- 2012 – Album Of The Year (Arturo Sandoval - Dear Diz Everyday I Think of You) – Nominated
- 2012 – Best Jazz Album (Arturo Sandoval - Dear Diz Everyday I Think of You) – Winner
- 2011 – Best Jazz Album (Arturo Sandoval - A Time for Love) – Winner
- 2011 – Best Engineered Album (Arturo Sandoval - A Time for Love) – Nominated

=== Composition and sound design ===
==== Golden Trailer Awards ====
- 2013 – Best Action (GI Joe: Retaliation) – NOMINEE
- 2013 – Best Animation / Family (Turbo) – NOMINEE
- 2013 – Best Horror (The Last Exorcism Part II) – NOMINEE
- 2013 – Best Horror (The Possession) – NOMINEE
- 2012 – Best Thriller (The Grey) – WINNER
- 2012 – Best Horror (The Devil Inside) – WINNER

==== Key Art Awards ====
- 2013 – Best Sound Design (Evil Dead) – GOLD
- 2013 – Best Sound Design (The Conjuring) – BRONZE
- 2013 – Single Entry (The Conjuring) – SILVER
- 2012 – Best Sound Design (Silent House) – BRONZE
- 2012 – Best Sound Design (The Possession) – FINALIST

=== Naras Award ===
- 2009 – NARAS Award
