= Sateda =

Sateda may refer to:

- Sateda, a fictional planet in the Stargate series from where Ronon Dex originates
- "Sateda" (Stargate Atlantis), an episode of the TV series Stargate Atlantis
