= Atlantis (Stargate) =

Fictional starship and city

- Stargate Atlantis vehicle
- First appearance: "Rising"; Stargate Atlantis; 2004
- Last appearance: "Enemy at the Gate"; Stargate Atlantis; 2009
- Created by: Bridget McGuire

Information
- Affiliation: Ancients
- Auxiliary vehicles: Puddle Jumper

General characteristics
- Class: City Ship
- Armaments: Drone weapon
- Defenses: Shield
- Power: Zero Point Module

Atlantis is a fictional starship and city in the Stargate television franchise. It is the primary setting of the television series Stargate Atlantis (2004-2009), and it has been depicted in Stargate SG-1 as well as various spin-off fiction and products. In the show, Atlantis was constructed millions of years ago by the Ancients, who eventually abandoned the city in the distant Pegasus Galaxy. In 2004, after SG-1 uncover the location of the city, Elizabeth Weir led a civilian and military expedition, setting up a base of operation in the city.

The shows production designer Bridget McGuire oversaw the interior set design of Atlantis, with James Robbins adding to it after taking over the role in the third season of Stargate Atlantis. McGuire and Robbins also worked on the exterior look of the city, collaborating with, amongst others, visual effects supervisor John Gajdecki and concept artist Chris Wren.

== Development and production ==
=== Development ===
Stargate SG-1 co-creator and executive producer first began developing an Atlantis spin-off around 2001 during SG-1's fifth season. The project went through a number of changes. At one stage, Atlantis would have been discovered beneath the ice in Antarctica in a Stargate SG-1 feature film. This would have set up an Atlantis spin-off series, which would have replaced Stargate SG-1 and taken place on Earth. Subsequently, after SG-1 was renewed for a sixth and then a seventh season, Atlantis was redeveloped as a Stargate feature film. After SG-1 was renewed once again for an eighth season and a TV series of Stargate Atlantis was also ordered, it was decided that the show would instead take place in the Pegasus Galaxy.

Following completing work on Stargate SG-1 season seven, Bridget McGuire and her art department were on hiatus. Stargate SG-1 had been confirmed for an eighth season in July 2003, but with no series order for Stargate Atlantis, McGuire assumed the show would not go ahead that year. Stargate Atlantis was given the green light on November 17 2003 and according to McGuire the day after meeting with executive producer John Smith, McGuire was back at work designing Atlantis.

Wright imagined Atlantis as being a city that had been created by a fictional race of beings called the Ancients, who had previously been established in Stargate SG-1. Having abandoned the city a long time ago, Wright and Cooper's story followed a joint civilian-military expeditionary team, who would discover the city of Atlantis "pristine and untouched", underwater on a planet in the Pegasus Galaxy. Whilst the city and its discovery were mostly built around the franchise's own mythology, some aspects of the Ancient Greek Plato myth of Atlantis were incorporated into elements of the story.

=== Concept ===
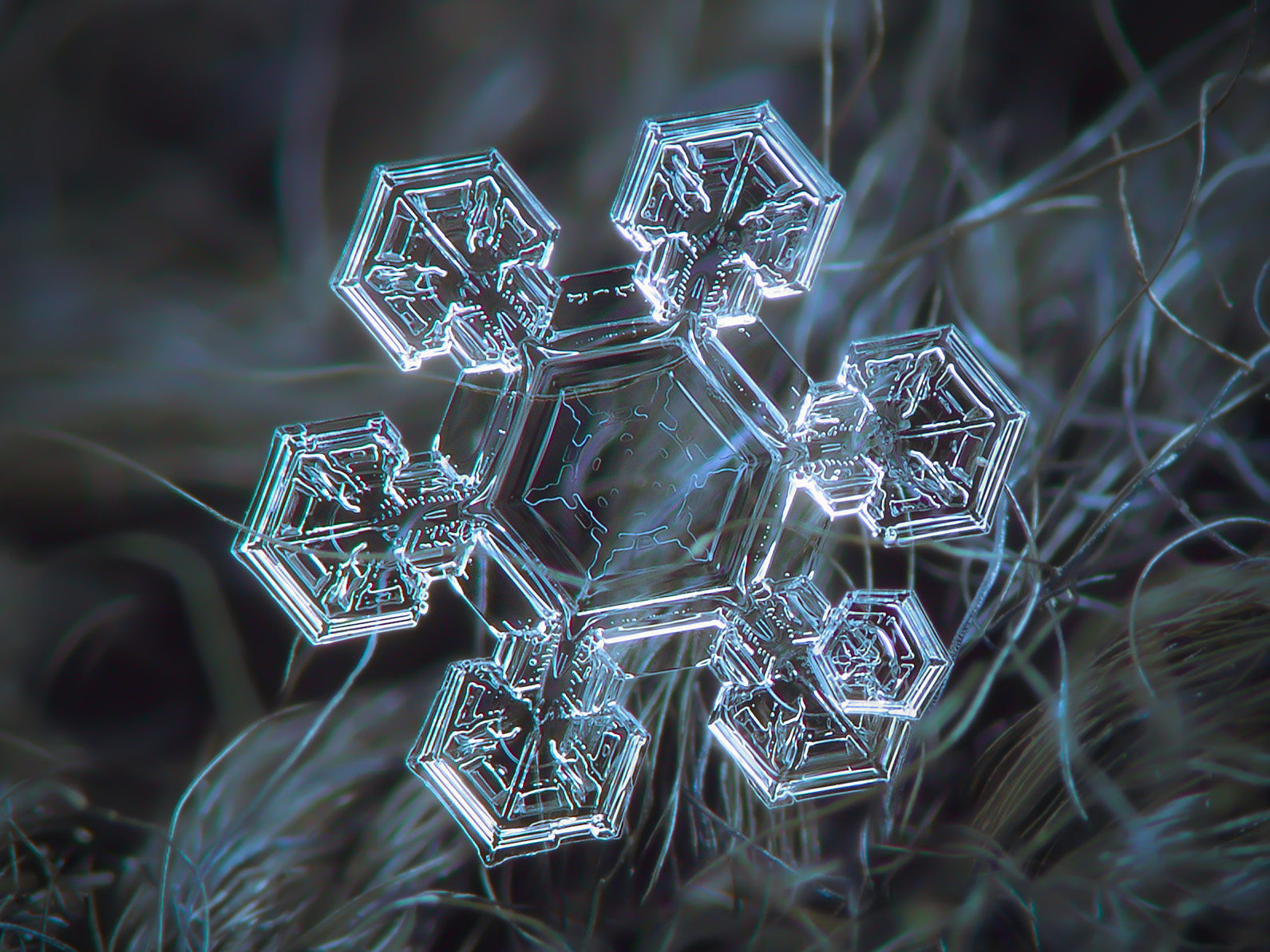
Images of snowflakes became a key design motif used by production Bridget McGuire for the Ancient Outpost in the Stargate SG-1 episode "Lost City". The motif was then carried across to Atlantis

During season seven of Stargate SG-1, production designer Bridget McGuire began developing design motifs that would be carried across to the City of Atlantis. Although it was ultimately decided that Atlantis would not be seen in "Lost City", the season seven finale, McGuire was mindful that the look of the Ancient Outpost discovered by SG-1 in the episode should "tie-in" to Atlantis, should the series be made. In developing design motifs for the Ancient Outpost, McGuire was researching crystalline structures when she "came across electron-microscopic images of snowflakes". McGuire felt these images "looked more like spaceships rather than snowflakes" and began incorporating them into her designs for the outpost.

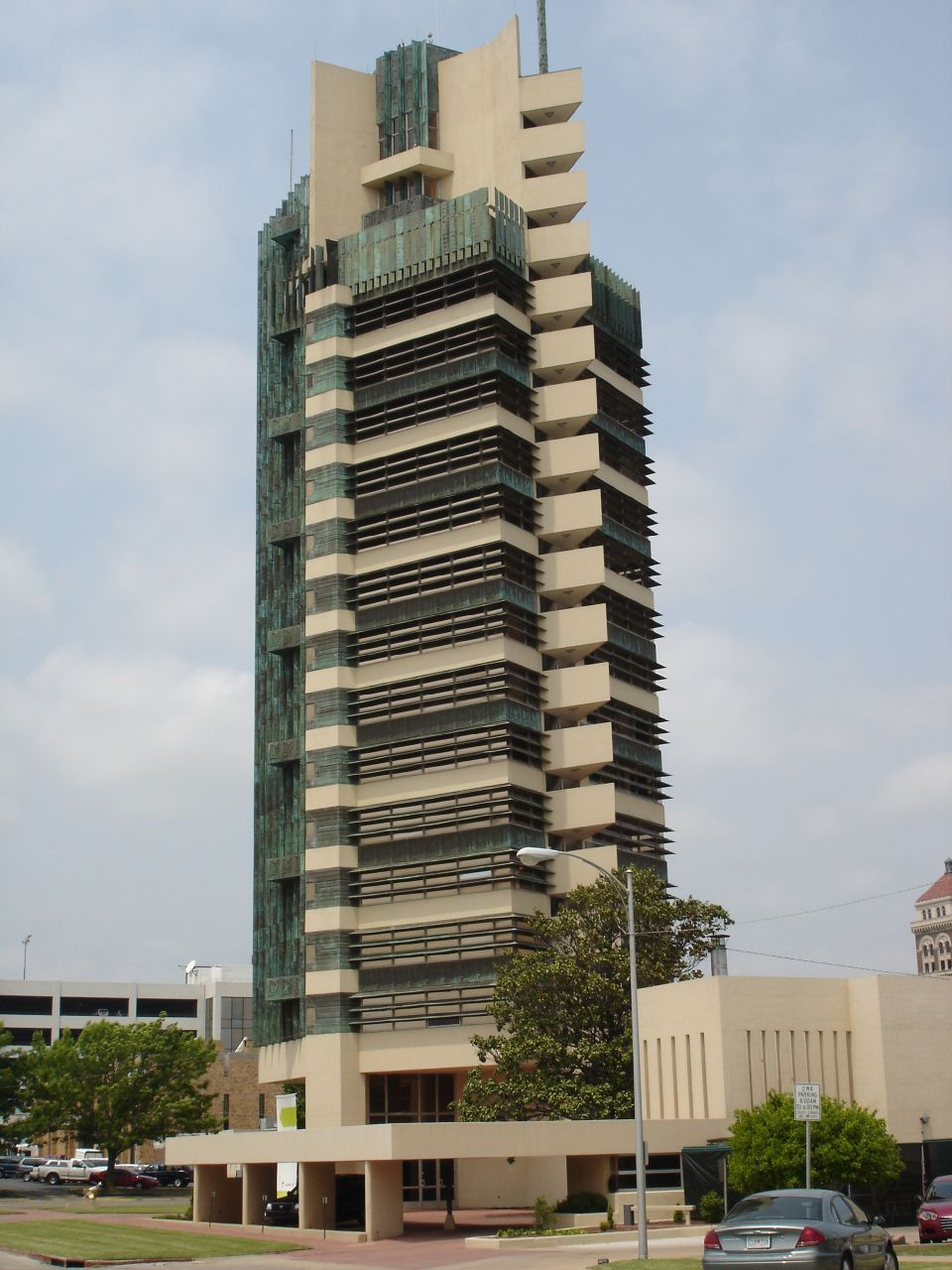
Price Tower in Bartleville, Oklahoma, which was designed by American architect Frank Lloyd Wright was amongst the influences for interior and exterior Atlantis set.

In designing the Atlantis, according to McGuire there were certain requirements for the set. Similarly to the Stargate Command set used on Stargate SG-1 there needed to be a Stargate, a control area, a conference room and some multi-purpose spaces that could become laboratories and other rooms as and when required. Despite this, Brad Wright and Robert C. Cooper wanted the Atlantis set to be aesthetically "distinctly different" from the Stargate Command, which McGuire noted "wasn't difficult to do" as she "basically just went in the opposite direction". In contrast to the "dark" and "claustrophobic" Stargate Command set, McGuire designed Atlantis to have "plenty of light and windows" and be "very open and airy". According to Wright, the Atlantis gate room "had to be big and have plenty of scope" imagining that Atlantis was "built as a base for Space exploration".

The work and architecture of Frank Lloyd Wright played a major influence in both the interior and exterior design of Atlantis. According to McGuire "It was a nice jumping-off place, because his architecture is so distinctive", specifically citing the geometry of the Lloyd Wright designed Price Tower in Bartleville, Oklahoma as informing that of the Atlantis set. Brad Wright decided on a copper colour pallet to be used throughout the sets of Atlantis, with bright reds to blue-green variations, based around copper oxidizing used.

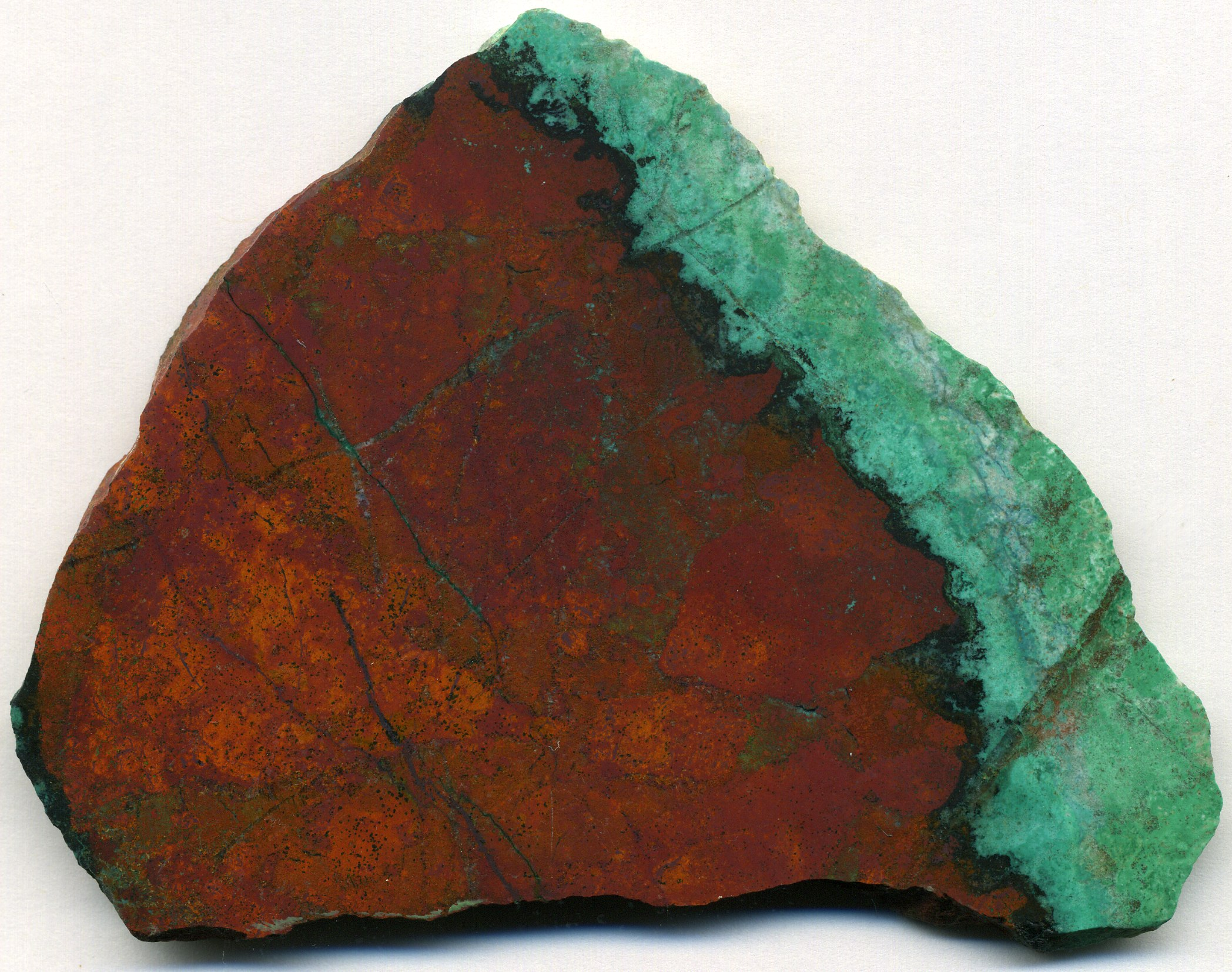
Photograph of cuprite-tenorite-chrysocolla ore. Brad Wright decided on copper colour pallet to be used throughout Atlantis, with bright reds to blue-green variations based on copper oxidizing, as pictured.

=== Sets ===
The main Atlantis set, consisting of the gateroom, control area, briefing room, Weir's office and multi-purpose rooms were constructed on Stage 6 at The Bridge Studios in Burnaby, Canada.

Having been given the greenlight on November 17, 2003, McGuire had less than 3 months to design and build the Atlantis set in time for filming to commence in February 2004. Although Wright and Cooper had an outline for Stargate Atlantis, they were still writing the script until the end of December 2003. McGuire and her team spent two weeks coming up with "The floor plan and general approach" as well as the costing for the set. Construction then commenced whilst the set continued to be designed and the script written. From November until February, around 200 people were involved in the design and construction of Atlantis, with building work taking place 24 hours a day and stopping only for Christmas. According to Wright the set was only finished "the morning on the first day of shooting".

In designing the sets for Atlantis, McGuire was mindful that production should be able to repurpose spaces and sets. McGuire recognised that the Stargate Command gateroom on Stargate SG-1 was a "giant set" which could not be easily reconfigured for any other uses, due to the Stargate prop being fixed. Keen to avoid the same problem in the even larger Atlantis gateroom set, McGuire's team designed a system that allowed the Stargate to be lowered down and hidden below the set floor. This then meant the set could be redressed as another space when required. The central gateroom area, often referred to as the "Gatetrium" was positioned on the ground floor, which was then linked by a staircase to the briefing room, control room and command office on the second floor. McGuire designed the open layout to both maximise the space and so that the Stargate appeared at an angle when viewed from the control and briefing rooms, "rather than flat on, like in the SGC". Below the briefing room, control room and command office was a space that could be used as a "swing set", with movable walls allowing production to repurpose the space into rooms such as an infirmary, a lab or living quarters. According to Wright, McGuire had designed the control room set to feature a spiral staircase, however during construction it was incorrectly installed behind a set wall and therefore only ended up being used for crew access. Frank Lloyd Wright's influence continued in the sets use of huge stained glass windows, which were used to achieve McGuire's desire to have a bright set, with plenty of light coming in. Robbin's designed windows and then printed them onto appliques, which were then adhered to glass.

In addition to the Atlantis sets designed and build specifically for the first season of the show, production also inherited a large set built for the 2004 film Blade: Trinity. Originally constructed on the effects stage at The Bridge Studios, McGuire described it as "a big metal frame structure", built across multiple levels, with numerous rooms, staircases and balconies. The set also included an arched metal bridge, constructed way above the main set. According to director Martin Wood the set cost Blade: Trinity nearly 2 million dollars to construct. Production tried "not to feature the set itself too much" until Blade: Trinity had come out, with the set being relied upon from the mid-first-season two-parter episodes "The Storm" & "The Eye". As the Blade set was so enormous, according to Wright it took "five years to eventually fill" as production "could only do sections at a time" of decoration and set dress. The effects stage was also used to build the Atlantis prison cell.

Some sets, such as the launch bay housing the Puddle Jumpers were created almost entirely digitally, with just a single set wall with a doorway built. Texture photographs of different walls from around the physical set were taken and with variations created by digitally altering the images, with artist Tom Brydon then building the set digitally. Additionally, digital set extensions were used whenever scenes took place on any of the cities outdoor balconies. During the first season of the show, Brad Wright was frustrated due to the lack of money available, often finding himself having to remove visual effects scenes with windows in Atlantis, venting "It's supposed to be this majestic city and you're really in closet after closet after closet". NEC-Mitsubishi provided flat-screen LCD displays for the Atlantis set, as well as refitting the Stargate Command set.

The set had been left up for some time after Stargate Atlantis was cancelled, with the intention that it would be used for the planned Stargate: Extinction spin-off film, however it was ultimately struck in early 2010.

=== Models and exterior ===
==== Design ====
Although it was ultimately not featured in the finished episode, McGuire had art director James Robbins develop concept drawings of the exterior of Atlantis during pre-production of the Stargate SG-1 season seven finale, "Lost City". The drawings depict an earlier version of the story, which would have seen Atlantis discovered in Antarctica on Earth.

Whilst the sets were being constructed, concept artist Chris Wren was hired to work on the exterior design of the city. McGuire, Wright and Cooper had already established the general shape and structure of the city, as well as outlying the technology present and "how the various sections interacted". Wren would go back-and-forth with his ideas to Cooper and Wright, working in a variety of mediums to produce concept art, which included quick pencil drawings, which he would then expanding into full colour artwork. Wren would also build scenes "with very basic primitive shapes" to help under composition and perspective and then go on to "paint over the render in Photoshop, adding all the ambient lighting and details". These drawings would be fed onto John Gajdecki and the visual effects team at Rainmaker, who were developing the visual effects model of Atlantis.

==== Visual Effects ====
At least two full models of Atlantis were created over the course of the show. The first Atlantis model was created entirely by Rainmaker Digital Effects, who were given an exclusivity contract to create all of the visual effects for the first season of Stargate Atlantis. The model was created in LightWave 3D and once completed was around was around 4 million polygons and contained over a gigabyte of textures, which made it the largest model created for the Stargate franchise and according to Cooper was ten times bigger than anything Rainmaker had previously built. According to visual effects supervisor Bruce Woloshyn, approximately 108 hours were spent on design modelling and a further 1,300 hours were modelling and texturing the main city model. When creating the model or visual effects scenes, artists would often digitally insert a Boeing 747 on Atlantis' piers so to help understand a sense of the models scale. Due to the cost of completing visual effect shots in at a higher resolution for high-definition television and in order to create as many visual effects shots as possible for the pilot episode, all of the visual effects, including those of Atlantis, were created in "standard definition" and were instead upscaled to fit a higher resolution.

Although the Atlantis model was entirely created using visual effects, many of the scenes it would appear in would contain live action elements. In the shows pilot episode, a visual effects sequence in which Atlantis rises from the bottom of the ocean required more water particle effects than the show would be able to afford. In order to overcome this, water particle visual effects were used for close-up shots, whilst live action water particles were used for the wider shots of the city. Rainmaker used Lightwave for creating the city, water and sky, whilst Autodesk Maya was used to create the water particle splash dynamics, developing a pipeline to move elements back and forth between the two programs. Production physically recreated Atlantis' 'pier e' out of industrial strength steel. The seven metre long model which weighed approximately two tonnes was subsequently transported to False Creek, Vancouver, where a crane was used to lower and lift the model to and from the water. Filmed at 120 frames per second, water coming off of the pier was captured from a variety of angles and subsequently composited into the visual effects shots of Atlantis rising. Additionally, water particles were filmed against a number of different backdrops to be added into various visual effects shots of the city. The sky surrounding Atlantis was created using photographs taken by many of the visual effects artists, including supervisors John Gajdecki and Bruce Woloshyn.

During the break between season one and two, executive producer Brad Wright decided to create a dedicated Stargate visual effects department, hiring former Stargate SG-1 visual effects supervisor James Tichenor to help set it up. According to visual effects supervisor Mark Savela, part of the reason for creating a dedicated in-house department was so that more of the models for both Stargate Atlantis and Stargate SG-1 could be created and controlled in-house and then far more easily be distributed to other visual effects vendors, allowing for more consistency between effects shots. A new Atlantis model was created in-house by Jose A. Perez. The geometry was created using Luxology's Modo, with lighting and texturing in Lightwave. The new model was subsequently distributed to other visual effects vendors. Stargate Atlantis continued to use different variations of the original Rainmaker model, as well as the in-house model across all of the subsequent seasons of the show.

== Depiction ==
The Lost City of the Ancients is first mentioned in the Stargate SG-1 episode "Full Circle". In the episode, SG-1 find a tablet which according to Dr. Daniel Jackson talks of the Lost City of the Ancients which contains powerful Ancient weapons that earth will be able to use against the Goa'uld Anubis. In the episode "Lost City", SG-1 travel to the planet Praclarush Taonas where they discover an Ancient outpost and learn that the Lost City is called Atlantis. SG-1 are directed back to earth where they discover another Ancient outpost. In the Stargate Atlantis episode "Rising", after studying the Ancient outpost discovered on earth, a Stargate address for Atlantis in the distant Pegasus galaxy is uncovered. Dr. Elizabeth Weir leads an expedition team through the Stargate where they uncover the Atlantis on the bottom of the ocean. As the city runs out of power, it rises to the surface and subsequently becomes a human base of operations.

In the episodes "The Storm" and "The Eye", after evacuating most personnel due to an approaching storm, the Genii, led by Commander Acastus Kolya take over Atlantis, until Major Shepherd is able to force them to retreat back through the Stargate. In 2005, two Wraith Hive Ships arrive in orbit of Atlantis and launch an air, then a ground attack against the city. The new Earth ship Daedalus commanded by Colonel Steven Caldwell arrives, staving off the Wraith in "The Siege". After coming across their ship, a group of Ancient are returned to Atlantis and control of the city is given to their leader, Helia, before the Asurans siege the city, and kill her in "The Return". Colonel Samantha Carter takes over the command of Atlantis in 2007 in the episode "Reunion". A year later she is replaced by Richard Woolsey in the episode "Search and Rescue". In 2009, an enhanced Wraith Hive Ship heads to Earth to feed upon the human race. With Earth ships unable to defeat the ship, Atlantis leaves the Pegasus Galaxy and returns to Earth. After destroying the Wraith ship, Atlantis lands in San Francisco Bay, overlooking the Golden Gate Bridge in the episode "Enemy at the Gate".
