= Rachel Luttrell =

Canadian actress

- Luttrell in 2026
- Born: Rachel Zawadi Luttrell; 19 January 1971 (age 55); Dar es Salaam, Tanzania
- Occupation: Actress
- Years active: 1986–2019
- Spouse: Loyd Bateman (m. 2007; div. 2021)
- Children: 2
- Relatives: Erica Luttrell (sister)

Rachel Zawadi Luttrell (/ˈlʌtrəl/ LUTT-rel; born January 19, 1971) is a Canadian actress, best known for her role as Teyla Emmagan in Stargate Atlantis (2004–2009).

== Early life ==
Luttrell was born on January 19, 1971, in Dar Es Salaam, Tanzania, the daughter of Veronica Makihio Shenkunde Luttrell of the Washambala tribe of the Usambara Mountains, and William Leon Luttrell, a doctor from Bossier City, Louisiana. She is one of four daughters. Her family emigrated to Canada when she was five years old, and she was raised in Toronto. Her family has several musical roots; her father, a former member of the critically acclaimed Toronto Mendelssohn Choir, trained Luttrell's soprano voice. She studied ballet at the Russian Academy of Classical Ballet School and also studied piano at The Royal Conservatory of Music in Toronto.

== Career ==
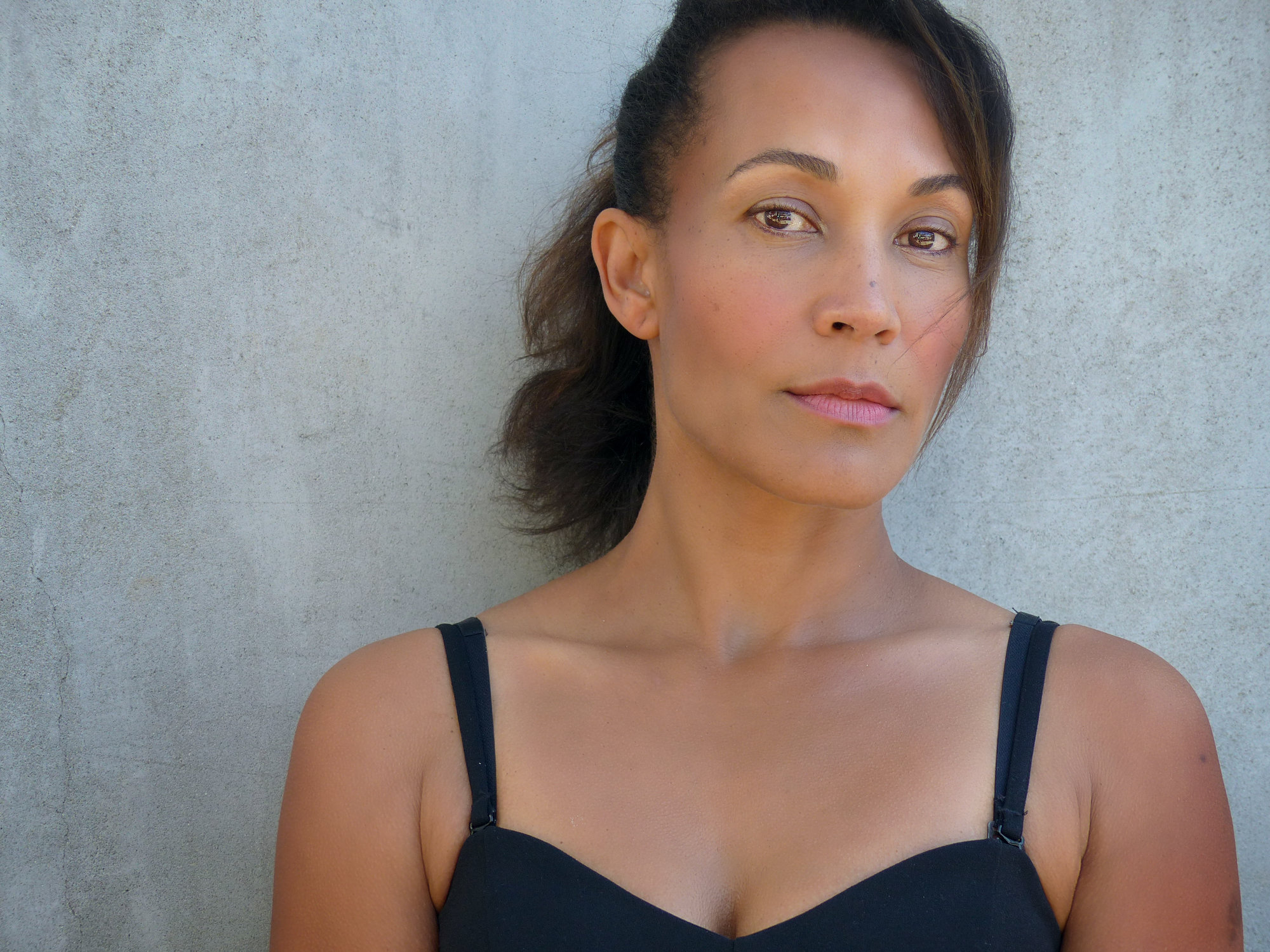
Luttrell in 2017

Luttrell made her professional debuts in Canada's premier production of Miss Saigon in Toronto, and as the Enchantress in the Canadian production of Disney's Beauty and the Beast. She would go on to appear in many other stage productions, such as Once On This Island, Goblin Market, and the first production of Pulitzer Prize–winning playwright Lynn Nottage's Las Meninas.

Following a move to Los Angeles, Luttrell became frustrated with some of the minor roles that were offered to her at the time, and considered giving up on her acting career to enroll at UCLA to study architecture. She ventured to the UK instead and studied at the British American Drama Association on a midsummer course at Balliol College, Oxford.

In 2004, Luttrell was cast in a main role as Athosian warrior-leader Teyla Emmagan on Stargate Atlantis. She remained in this role until the end of the series in 2009. Her Atlantis co-star David Hewlett cast her in the Canadian movie A Dog's Breakfast, which he directed.

In 2011, Luttrell ventured into jazz music, releasing her first album I Wish You Love, produced by Gerrit Kinkel and featuring double bass player Jennifer Leitham, Graham Dechter, Konrad Paszkudzki and drummer Jeff Hamilton.

== Personal life ==
Luttrell married Loyd Bateman, a former stunt performer, in 2007; they have two children together, a son, Caden, born in 2007, and a daughter, Ridley, born in 2012. They divorced in 2021. Luttrell has two younger sisters, Erica Luttrell, who is also an actress, and Amanda Luttrell Garrigus, who is an on-air personality in the fashion and entertainment worlds.

== Filmography ==
=== Film ===
Year	Title	Role	Notes
1986	Courage	Bobby's Daughter	TV film
1992	Personal Effects		Short film
1995	House		
1996	Joe's So Mean to Josephine	Girl in Bar	
2001	Feast of All Saints	Lisette	TV film
2001	Impostor	Scan Room Nurse	
2003	Everyday Use	Dee	
2004	Stop Thief!	Nicky	Short film
2005	The Aviary	Portia	
2007	A Dog's Breakfast	Ratcha	
2009	Hardwired	Candace	
2019	Zombieland: Double Tap	Terrified Woman in Snow	

=== Television ===
Year	Title	Role	Notes
1989–1993	Street Legal	Veronica Beck	20 episodes
1992	Forever Knight	Officer Norma Alves	"Hunters"
1993	Maniac Mansion	Lorrie	"Tina and the Teardrops"
1995	The Great Defender	Reporter	"Naked Truth", "Camille"
1997	Dogs	Mimi	"1.1"
1997	In the House	Daphne	"The Cruise: Parts 1 & 2"
1998	Damon	Brenda	"Under Covers"
1998	Sleepwalkers		"Cassandra"
2001	Charmed	Janna	"Exit Strategy"
2001	ER	Paramedic	"Rampage"
2002	Touched by an Angel	Marla	"The Sixteenth Minute"
2004–2009	Stargate Atlantis	Teyla Emmagan	91 episodes
2011	True Justice	Lt. Humphreys	"Urban Warfare: Part 1"
2011	NCIS	Navy Lt. Cmmdr. Stephanie Mosner	"Sins of the Father"
2013	NCIS: Los Angeles	CIA Agent Yvette Lowell	"Big Brother"
2015	No Sleep Till 18	Jill	"Everyone's Got an Opinion"
2016	Arrow	Rosie	"Code of Silence"
2018	Girlfriends' Guide to Divorce	Oona Falcone	2 episodes
2019	The I-Land	Brooke	"The Dark Backward"
