= Teyla Emmagan =

Fictional character in Stargate Atlantis

- Rachel Luttrell as Teyla Emmagan
- First appearance: "Rising" (Atlantis)
- Portrayed by: Rachel Luttrell

In-universe information
- Species: Human from Athos
- Occupation: Leader of the Athosian people
- Family: Torren (father), Torren John Emmagan (son), Tagan (mother)

Teyla Emmagan is a fictional character played by Rachel Luttrell in the science fiction series Stargate Atlantis.

In the show, she is the daughter of Tagan, and was a leader of a village on the planet Athos. She had seen much of her family culled by the Wraith, although she (and some of her fellow Athosians) possessed the ability to "sense" the Wraith. Teyla is skilled in military strategy, martial arts, and Pegasus-galaxy diplomacy. She displays knowledge of and proficiency with Earth technology. She practices a form of stick-fighting (based on Eskrima) with John Sheppard and has taken up use of Earth weapons (such as a P-90).

== Role in Stargate Atlantis ==
=== Character arc ===
Teyla Emmagan is the leader of the Athosians, a human race of farmers, hunters, and traders from the planet Athos in the Pegasus Galaxy. She is the daughter of Tagan. The Athosians are the first natives of Pegasus whom the Atlantis Expedition encounters on their scouting of potential evacuation sites in "Rising".

After a Wraith attack on Athos, Teyla and the Athosians relocate to Atlantis. Friction in "Suspicion" leads to the Athosians leaving Atlantis and settling on the mainland. Teyla stays with Sheppard's team, but later helps with evacuating the Athosians from the mainland several times in the face of various threats.

In Season 1's "The Gift," Teyla and the Atlantis expedition learn that her ancestors were experimented on by a Wraith scientist. Teyla is revealed to be one of the few Athosians who possesses trace amounts of Wraith DNA, allowing her to sense the Wraith through their telepathic network. Teyla uses this so-called "gift" in many ways throughout the series, both actively and passively, against the Wraith. She flies a Wraith hive ship in Season 3's "Misbegotten", and has immunity from hallucinatory signals sent out by a Wraith device in "Phantoms".

Despite initially being distrusted (mostly by military officials), Teyla is left in charge of Atlantis in the absence of the expedition's regular leadership. In the third-season episode "The Return", Atlantis is reclaimed by a group of Ancients and the Athosians are asked to leave Lantea, settling on a planet they name New Athos, which is unknown to the Wraith. They remain on the planet after Earth regains control of Atlantis, and the Atlantis Expedition provides them with supplies and weapons.

Although Teyla notes that she has often felt like an outsider among the Atlantis Earth crew, the rescue of fellow reconnaissance teammate Ronon Dex convinces her of the team's loyalty to one another.

Season 3's "Sunday" reveals that Teyla has a romantic interest in an unnamed male, who is presumably unaware of her feelings. In season 4, however, Teyla discovers that she is pregnant at the end of "Missing". The child's father is an Athosian named Kanaan. When Teyla is three months pregnant in "Be All My Sins Remember'd", Sheppard suspends her from active duty. In the meantime, the Athosian people have gone missing, and the search for clues to their disappearance proves a season-long arc for Teyla. Michael and his genetic experiments to create Wraith/Human Hybrids are found out to be responsible for the Athosian's disappearance near the end of season 4. At the beginning of season 5, Teyla gives birth to a son, whom she names Torren John after her father and Sheppard. (When fans pointed out that Teyla had introduced herself as "daughter of Tagan" in "Rising", implying her father's name as Tagan, executive producer Joseph Mallozzi suggested that Teyla could have actually been referring to her mother.)

=== Characterization ===
Teyla has many Athosian character traits. She also has the ability to sense Wraith and control them. Although many of the Athosians possess martial skills, they do not consider themselves warriors. The Athosians are widely travelled in Pegasus and are trading partners with many worlds; their extensive knowledge of the Pegasus galaxy has availed the Expedition on several occasions. A spiritual people, the Athosians venerate the Ancestors (better known as the Ancients), and dedicate prayers to them. They also hold Atlantis sacred, and many object when they learn that the Expedition plans to destroy Atlantis rather than let it fall to the Wraith. Due to the constant threat of Wraith attack, Athosians consider it a privilege to know when and where one is about to die, and have a ritual prayer for the occasion meant to prepare that person for death. In Athosian culture, a woman is not expected to express her attraction to someone before the man does.

== Conceptual history ==
In the original script, Teyla was called Mikala. Kira Clavell originally auditioned for the role of Teyla, but although she caught the eye of the producers, she was not "quite right for Teyla" and was given the role of Amaterasu in the SG-1 two-parter "New Order" instead. Teyla's pregnancy in season 4 was the result of Luttrell's real-life pregnancy.
