= Timothy Williams (composer) =

English/Canadian composer, conductor and orchestrator (b.1966)

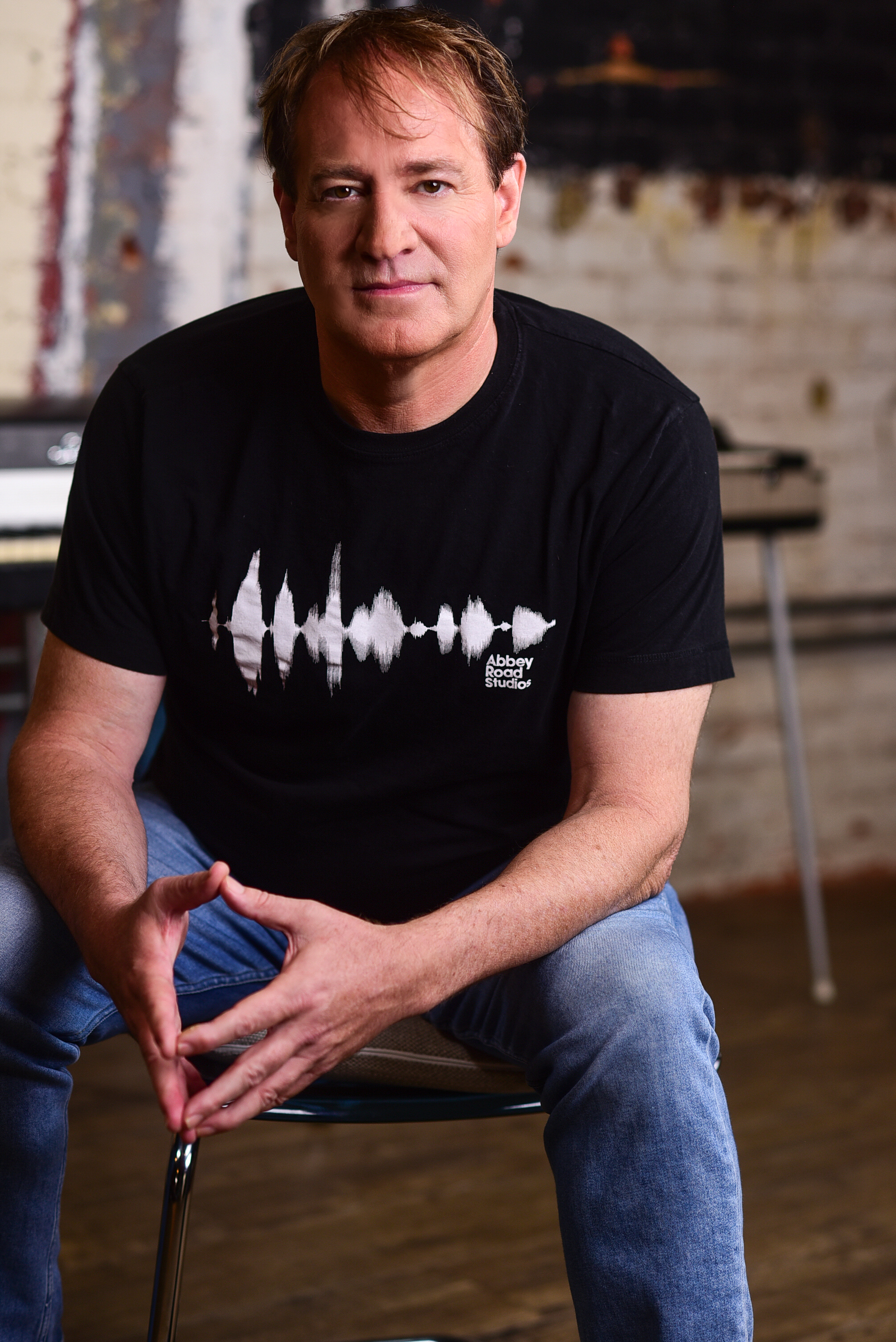

Background information
- Born: Surrey, England
- Genres: Film score, television score, contemporary classical, musical theatre
- Occupations: Composer; Conductor; Orchestrator
- Years active: 1993-present
- Website: timothywilliams.net

Timothy Williams is an English/Canadian composer, conductor, and orchestrator known for his film, television, and video game scores. A graduate of the National Film and Television School, Williams has won numerous awards and is best known for his award-winning work on the A24 film Pearl, Finding You, Brightburn, Get Out, Guardians of the Galaxy, Guardians of the Galaxy Vol. 2, Deadpool 2 and Robert Duvall's Wild Horses. He is a frequent collaborator of musician and composer Tyler Bates, Robert Duncan and Benjamin Wallfisch.

== Early life and education ==
Williams went to St. Michaels University School in Victoria, Canada, at the same time as Leslie Hope, Andrew Sabiston, Kenneth Oppel, and Bert Archer. He then attended the National Film and Television School in England and furthered his studies at UCLA Extension and the ASCAP Film Scoring Workshop.

== Career ==
=== Theatre ===
Williams wrote the musical Napoleon, which opened in 1994 at the Elgin Theatre in Toronto. It was nominated for a Dora Award for Best New Musical. EMI released a Highlights Album on their Angel Broadway label. In 1996, he relocated to England and worked with Directors Gale Edwards and Francesca Zambello to rework Napoleon until its opening at the Shaftesbury Theatre in London's West End Theatre District in 2000. Napoleon did a run at NYMF in 2015, which was a reimagining of the original show with an entirely new book and many new songs.

In July 2017, a lavish new production Napoleon opened at the Charlotte Theater in Seoul for a limited three-month. It quickly became the number one selling ticket of the summer. It feature a cast of 54 including B.A.P's Daehyun and BTOB's Changsub alongside famous musical actors such as Lim Tae Kyung, Michael Lee, and Han Ji Sang. It was directed by Richard Ouzounian and features all new sets, costumes, projections, orchestrations and was translated into Korean. It received glowing reviews. It is repped in Asia by Broadway Asia. In August 2022, Napoleon was translated into Dutch and performed in Holland. In September 2022 Napoleon was translated into French and a large scale tribute concert was performed in Seoul, Korea. In May 2023 Napoleon did a four-week run in Seoul.

=== Film ===
Williams has scored numerous award-winning feature films including A24's Pearl, Bagman, Finding You, Brightburn, Wild Horses, written, directed and starring Robert Duvall, Josh Hartnett and James Franco; "We Summon The Darkness", Disney Jr.'s "Piney The Lonesome Pine", starring Jonathan Pryce and Simon Pegg, Walking with the Enemy, starring Ben Kingsley, the score for which was on the eligible list for the 2015 Academy Awards, and won Best Picture at FLIFF, I.T. directed by John Moore starring Pierce Brosnan, I'm Not Ashamed, directed by Brian Baugh, nominated for Best picture at the 2017 Dove Awards, Diablo, starring Scott Eastwood and Walton Goggins which won Best Picture at the San Diego film festival, The Butterfly Circus which won over 35 Best Picture awards, the Tom Hanks produced WWII documentary Beyond All Boundaries, Red Sky for which Tim Williams was nominated Best Composer and Music Editor by Motion Picture Sound Editors.

He has received numerous awards including winner of 2023 "Best UK Critics Horror Score", nomination for 2023 "Best International Critics Horror score", and a 2023 Crystal Pine Award nomination for best score, two Motion Picture SE Golden Reel Award nominations for "Red Sky", four Thea Award wins, 10 ASCAP Plus Awards and winner of best score at the 24FPS Festival for "Butterfly Circus" and best score at LA Screamfest for "We Summon The Darkness".

Recent films include Mary (2024 film), Your Monster, Pearl, The Swearing Jar, Finding You, Brightburn, which was listed among of the best scores of 2019 in Film Music Magazine, Piney - The Lonesome Pine, starring Simon Pegg and Jonathan Pryce, released on Disney Jr., and We Summon The Darkness directed by Marc Meyers, which won best score at Screamfest LA.

He scored additional music on many major films including Get Out, Hobbs & Shaw, Guardians of the Galaxy, Deadpool 2, Guardians of the Galaxy Vol. 2, Conan the Barbarian, 300, Watchmen, Super, Sucker Punch, Doomsday, Shark Night 3D.

Upcoming films include Lionsgate's The Bagman, Intermedium, Founders Day, and Your Monster.

=== Orchestrations and conducting ===
In addition to orchestrating and conducting all the above, Williams also orchestrated and/or conducted the scores to Deadpool 2, The Spy Who Dumped Me, Christopher Robin, Hidden Figures, Guardians of the Galaxy Vol. 2, It, Premium Rush, Green Hornet, The Way, The Day The Earth Stood Still, Halloween, Slither, and Half Past Dead. Williams has orchestrated for Tyler Bates, Alan Menken, Stephen Schwartz, Robert Duncan, and Bruce Broughton. He conducted for the soundtrack to Valve's Dota 2 and orchestrated Zella Day's album Kicker and "Love is Alive" from Lea Michele's album.

=== TV ===
Williams scored the Sony Animation/Netflix series Agent Elvis, AMC/Shudder Creepshow, the FOX pilot Richard Lovely, and the Disney pilot Madison High and additional music on the Cartoon Network animated series Sym-Bionic Titan, ABC's Missing as well as Fox's The Exorcist, Season 2. He orchestrated the TV series Castle, Whispers, Last Resort, Timeless, and S.W.A.T.

=== Video games ===
He contributed music for the video game score of Rise of the Argonauts with composer Tyler Bates and contributed additional music on God of War: Ascension. He orchestrated and conducted Transformers: The Game and Army of Two: The 40th Day.

=== Live spectacle ===
Williams has also written music and arranged for over 55 live and spectacle shows for Disney, Universal Studios and Seaworld, including Universal's adaptation of "Wicked", Disney's "Aladdin" (Thea Award) at California Adventure, Disney's Tangled – The Musical, Disney's "Snow White", Disney's "Believe", Disney's "Wishes", Disney's "Twice Charmed", Seaworld's "Blue Horizons", Seaworld's "Believe", Disney's "Candlelight Reflection", Disney's "Rhythms of The World", Disney's "Glow in the Park", Disney's "Buzz Lightyears Big Mission", Universal Studio's "Sorciere" and Universal's "Peter Pan" and Napoleon, the West End show. He composed the score for the Georgia Aquarium's "Dolphin Tales". At least 15 shows are currently playing around the world. He has won 4 Thea awards and a Dora Award for the projects "Aladdin – A Disney Spectacular", Universal's "Peter Pan", and "Voice of an Angel" and "Beyond All Boundaries". Timothy arranged the music for the opening of Shanghai Disneyland, which was later turned into "Lunar New Year" for the "World of Color Show" at California Adventure. Williams most recently composed and arranged the Jurassic World Live Tour for Universal Studios.

== Awards and nominations ==
Timothy Williams has received numerous awards including winner of 2023 "Best UK Critics Horror Score", nomination for 2023 "Best International Critics Horror score", and a 2023 Crystal Pine Award nomination for best score, two Motion Picture SE Golden Reel Award nominations for "Red Sky", four Thea Award wins, 10 ASCAP Plus Awards and winner of best score at the 24FPS Festival for "Butterfly Circus" and best score at LA Screamfest for "We Summon The Darkness".

He has over 30 soundtracks released on labels Sony Records, Milan Records, Lakeshore Records, Disney, EMI Broadway Asia, and First Night Records.

== Filmography ==
=== Film ===
| Year | Title | Director | Notes |
|---|---|---|---|
| 2002 | A Time for Dancing | Peter Gilbert | Composer additional music |
| 2002 | Half Past Dead | Don Michael Paul | Orchestrator |
| 2005 | Gotham Cafe | Jack Edward Sawyers | Composer |
| 2005 | The Devil's Rejects | Rob Zombie | Orchestrator & conductor |
| 2005 | The Moment After 2: The Awakening | Wes Llewelyn | Composer |
| 2006 | Slither | James Gunn | Orchestrator |
| 2006 | 300 | Zack Snyder | Orchestrator, conductor, choral arranger & composer of additional music |
| 2007 | A Dog's Breakfast | David Hewlett | Composer |
| 2007 | Aberration | Douglas Elford-Argent | Composer |
| 2007 | The Passage | Mark Heller | Composer |
| 2007 | Halloween | Rob Zombie | Orchestrator & conductor |
| 2008 | Doomsday | Neil Marshall | Orchestrator, conductor & composer of additional music |
| 2008 | The Day the Earth Stood Still | Scott Derrickson | Orchestrator & conductor |
| 2009 | Up in the Air | Wes Llewelyn | Composer |
| 2009 | Star Crossed | Mark Heller | Composer |
| 2009 | The Butterfly Circus | Joshua Weigel | Composer |
| 2009 | Playmobil: The Secret of Pirate Island | Alexander Sokoloff | Composer |
| 2009 | Beyond All Boundaries | David Briggs | Composer |
| 2009 | Watchmen | Zack Snyder | Composer additional music, orchestrator & conductor |
| 2010 | The Brazen Bull | Douglas Elford-Argent | Composer |
| 2010 | The Mulberry Tree | Mark Heller | Composer |
| 2010 | The Way | Emilio Estevez | Orchestrator & conductor. |
| 2010 | Super | James Gunn | Composer additional music |
| 2011 | Blood Soldiers: Interrogation | Jake Thornton | Composer |
| 2011 | The Lutefisk Wars | Christopher Panneck; David E. Hall | Composer |
| 2011 | The Green Hornet | Michel Gondry | Orchestration |
| 2011 | Sucker Punch | Zack Snyder | Composer additional music, orchestrator & conductor |
| 2011 | Conan the Barbarian | Marcus Nispel | Composer additional music, orchestrator & conductor |
| 2011 | The Entitled | Aaron Woodley | Orchestrator & conductor |
| 2012 | The History of Future Folk | Jeremy Kipp Walker; John Anderson Mitchell | Composer |
| 2012 | The Darkest Hour | Chris Gorak | Orchestrator |
| 2012 | Premium Rush | David Koepp | Orchestrator & conductor |
| 2013 | Walking with the Enemy | Mark Schmidt | Composer |
| 2014 | Red Sky | Mario Van Peebles | Composer |
| 2014 | Guardians of the Galaxy | James Gunn | Composer additional music, orchestrator & conductor |
| 2014 | Fragmented | Douglas Elford-Argent | Composer |
| 2014 | Debug | David Hewlett | Composer |
| 2014 | The Sun Devil and the Princess | Steven Ayromlooi | Composer |
| 2015 | Wild Horses | Robert Duvall | Composer |
| 2015 | Diablo | Lawrence Roeck | Composer |
| 2015 | Kill Me, Deadly | Darrett Sanders | Orchestrator |
| 2016 | I'm Not Ashamed | Brian Baugh | Composer |
| 2016 | I.T. | John Moore | Composer |
| 2016 | Spark: A Space Tail | Aaron Woodley | Orchestrator |
| 2016 | Hidden Figures | Theodore Melfi | Conductor |
| 2017 | The Tank | Kellie Madison | Composer |
| 2017 | Get Out | Jordan Peele | Composer additional music, orchestrator & conductor |
| 2017 | Guardians of the Galaxy Vol. 2 | James Gunn | Arranger, synth programmer, conductor, & lead orchestrator |
| 2017 | Annabelle: Creation | David F. Sandberg | Conductor |
| 2017 | It | Andy Muschietti | Conductor |
| 2017 | 24 Hours to Live | Brian Smrz | Composer additional music |
| 2018 | Deadpool 2 | David Leitch | Conductor, orchestrator & programmer |
| 2018 | The Spy Who Dumped Me | Susanna Fogel | Conductor, orchestrator & programmer |
| 2018 | Christopher Robin | Marc Forster | Conductor |
| 2018 | The Darkest Minds | Jennifer Yuh Nelson | Conductor |
| 2018 | Nocturne | Andy Schuler; Sean Michael Williams | Composer |
| 2018 | Perfect Pair | Neil Jackson | Composer |
| 2019 | Brightburn | David Yarovesky | Composer |
| 2019 | A Modern Magician | Mark Heller | Composer |
| 2019 | Piney The Lonesome Pine | Todd Edwards & Timothy Hooten | Composer |
| 2019 | Hobbs & Shaw | David Leitch | Composer additional music, orchestrator & conductor |
| 2019 | It Chapter Two | Andy Muschietti | Conductor |
| 2020 | We Summon the Darkness | Marc Meyers | Composer |
| 2021 | Finding You | Brian Baugh | Composer |
| 2021 | Gringa | EJ Foerester | Composer |
| 2021 | Have You Heard About Greg? | Steve Ecclesine | Conductor |
| 2021 | Fist | Andrew McVicar | Composer |
| 2021 | Southern Gospel | Jeffrey Smith | Composer |
| 2021 | The Swearing Jar | Lindsay MacKay | Composer/Song Producer and Arranger |
| 2022 | Pearl | Ti West | Composer |
| 2022 | She Came from the Woods | Eric and Carson Bloomquist | Composer |
| 2022 | Catch Your Breath | Matt Sears | Composer |
| 2022 | Dayshift | J.J. Perry | Orchestrator |
| 2022 | DC League of Super-Pets | Jared Stern Sam Levine | Orchestrator |
| 2022 | Red Notice | Rawson Marshall Thurber | Orchestrator |
| 2022 | John Wick: Chapter 4 | Chad Stahelski | Orchestrator |
| 2023 | Gringa | Marny Eng and EJ Foerster | Composer |
| 2023 | Tiger's Apprentice | Raman Hui | Orchestrator |
| 2023 | Fools Paradise | Charlie Day | Conductor |
| 2023 | The Boogeyman | Rob Savage | Orchestrator and Conductor |
| 2023 | Founders Day | Erik Bloomquist | Composer |
| 2023 | Intermedium | Erik Bloomquist | Composer |
| 2023 | The Color Purple | Blitz Bazawule | Song Arranger |
| 2023 | Borderlands | Eli Roth | Orchestration |
| 2024 | Mistura | Ricardo de Montreuil | Composer |
| 2024 | MaXXXine | Ti West | Orchestrator/Keyboards |
| 2024 | Somewhere In Dreamland | Colin Tilley | Composer |
| 2024 | Bagman | Colm McCarthy | Composer |
| 2024 | Your Monster | Caroline Lindy | Composer |
| 2024 | Mary | D. J. Caruso | Composer |
| 2025 | Fixed | Genndy Tartakovsky | Additional Music and Orchestrations |
| 2025 | Locked | David Yarovesky | Composer |

=== Television ===
| Year | Title | Notes |
|---|---|---|
| 2014 | Last Resort | Orchestrator - 13 episodes |
| 2014 | Madison High (Disney) | Composer |
| 2015 | The Whispers | Lead orchestrator - 13 episodes |
| 2015-16 | Castle | Orchestrator |
| 2016 | Quantico | Lead orchestrator |
| 2017 | Empire | Conductor |
| 2017 | The Exorcist | Composer additional music |
| 2016-18 | Timeless | Lead orchestrator |
| 2017-2021 | S.W.A.T. | Lead orchestrator |
| 2019 | Creepshow (AMC/Shudder) | Composer |
| 2019 | Richard Lovely (FOX) | Composer |
| 2020 | Piney The Lonesome Pine (Disney Jr.) | Composer |
| 2022 | The Night Agent (10 Episodes) | Orchestrator |
| 2023 | Agent Elvis Netflix/Sony Animation (10 Episodes) | Composer |
| 2023 | Echo Marvel (6 Episodes) | Orchestrator |

=== Video games ===
| Year | Title | Notes |
|---|---|---|
| 2008 | The Rise of the Argonauts | Composer additional music |
| 2010 | Army of Two: The 40th Day | Composer additional music, orchestrator |
| 2012 | Call of Duty: Black Ops II | Orchestrator |
| 2013 | God of War: Ascension | Composer additional music, orchestrator and conductor |
| 2013 | Dota 2 | Orchestrator and conductor |
