= Kim Schraner =

Canadian actress

- Born: 1976 (age 49–50); Toronto, Ontario, Canada

Kim Schraner (born 1976) is a Canadian actress, who starred in the children's spy TV series Spynet, shown in Canada on CBC Television.

Schraner starred in the Showcase soap opera Paradise Falls as the character Jessica Lansing. She starred in the pilot episode of T.R.A.X., which wasn't picked up as a series. She's had appearances in various TV shows, including Mutant X, PSI Factor, Twice In A Lifetime, The Newsroom, and Due South. She's also appeared in the TV movies Common Ground and The Hunt for the Unicorn Killer.

== Early years ==
Schraner studied at the classical piano with The Royal Conservatory of Music. She studied ballet through the Royal Academy of Dance programme.

Schraner started modeling for magazines and TV commercials at the age of 14. In 1994 she was seen widely as the "Oxy Girl" in TV ads. While completing her education, she appeared in several stage productions that included Waiting for Godot, Uncle Vanya, Top Girls, As You Like It, The Plague, and others.

== Filmography ==
Title	Years(s)	Type	Character	Description
Saw 3D	2010	Movie	Palmer	The seventh movie in the Saw series. Shot in 3D.
Testees	2008	TV series	Kate	A comedy about two 30 something friends whose job is to be test patients for a company called Testico. Schraner plays their friend, Kate, who owns a bar called 'Tears.'
A Dennis the Menace Christmas	2007	Movie	Alice Mitchell	Dennis Christmas is a Dennis The Menace version of A Christmas Carol where Mr. Wilson plays his own version of Scrooge. While Dennis has problems of his own with the neighborhood bully, he does his best to try to give Mr. Wilson the Christmas Spirit. Dennis causes his usual damage and Mr. Wilson ends up breaking Dennis' spirit. An Angel of Christmas Past Present and Future steps in to help save Christmas for the Mitchells, the Wilsons, and everyone else.
Spynet	2002–2004	TV series	Sam	Children's educational drama revolving around Sam, who is a spy.
See Jane Date	2003	TV movie	Dana	About a girl's dating life in New York City. The wedding of Dana and Larry(Jamie Elman), serves as a setting for Jane(Charisma Carpenter) to meet potential dates.
Perfect Pie	2002	Movie	Cindy	Drama about friendship, which was adapted from the play Perfect Pie by Judith Thompson.
All Around the Town	2002	TV movie	Laurie Kinmount	Schraner plays the starring role in this murder mystery, college student Laurie, who as a past victim of childhood kidnapping and molestation, has since developed a split personality as a result. The story was based on the book of the same name, written by Mary Higgins Clark. For marketing reasons, the much more famous Nastassja Kinski, who played the lesser role in this movie, was given top billing when the movie was released on video.
American Psycho 2	2002	Movie (direct to video)	Elizabeth McGuire	Horror film about a serial killer, played by Mila Kunis at a university. Her ex-FBI professor is played by William Shatner. Schraner plays the professors assistant.
A Killing Spring	2002	TV movie	Kelly Savage	Thriller about the murder of a college dean.
Paradise Falls	2001	TV series	Jessica Lansing	Weekly soap opera set in Northern Ontario's Cottage Country. Jessica is the fiancée of the Nick Braga.
The Unsaid (The Ties That Bind)	2001	Movie	Chloe	Thriller about an adolescent girl and a psychiatrist.
Common Ground	2000	TV movie	Suze	Three short stories about homosexuality
Harry's Case	2000	TV movie		About an ex-lawyer working as a private investigator.
T.R.A.X.	2000	TV pilot		Standing for "Trace, Research, Analyze and Exterminate", this science fiction show was about a team that hunts down the abnormal and paranormal. Schraner co-starred with Martin Cummins in the pilot for the series, which was not picked by Fox, as hoped by the producers.
The Hunt for the Unicorn Killer	1999	TV movie	Shelly	Based on true story of escaped fugitive, Ira Einhorn, accused of killing Holly Maddux.
Milgaard	1999	TV movie	Peggy	Based on true story of David Milgaard, falsely accused of murder.
Summer of the Monkeys	1998	Movie	Rose	Family drama about a young boy who wants a horse, but finds monkeys instead.
Senior Trip	1995	Movie	Caroline	Comedy about a student trip to Washington, D.C.
Ultimate Betrayal	1994	TV movie	Susan age 15-19	Courtroom drama about incest, and the children who take their abusive father to court over it. Mel Harris played Susan, one of the star characters, as a middle-aged adult. Schraner played Susan as a teenager.
Rapture	1993	TV movie	Cheerleader	Drama about a computer software designer who becomes obsessed with a woman he's had a crush on since high school.
