= Debug (film) =

2014 Canadian science fiction horror film

- Directed by: David Hewlett
- Written by: David Hewlett
- Produced by: Steve Hoban
- Starring: Jeananne Goossen; Adrian Holmes; Adam Butcher; Jason Momoa
- Cinematography: Gavin Smith
- Edited by: Geoff Ashenhurst; Jorge Weisz
- Music by: Tim Williams
- Production company: Copperheart Entertainment
- Distributed by: Signature Entertainment
- Release date: 3 November 2014 (UK)
- Running time: 82 minutes
- Country: Canada
- Language: English

Debug is a 2014 Canadian science fiction horror film written and directed by David Hewlett. It stars Jeananne Goossen, Adrian Holmes, Adam Butcher, Kjartan Hewitt, Sidney Leeder, and Jadyn Wong as computer programmers who must deal with a hostile artificial intelligence on an interstellar spaceship. It was released on 3 November 2014 in the UK.

== Plot ==
Six programmers incarcerated for hacking are out on work release, led by the corrections officer Capra. Their mission is to reboot and restore an abandoned spacecraft found floating aimlessly through space.

Once aboard the spacecraft, each hacker is assigned a task to reboot the system. Before the assignments begin, Mel argues that he should be placed in charge because Kaida had a fellow prisoner killed during the last work release, although it remains unclear whether it was intentional or accidental. Capra, the corrections officer, puts Mel in charge, and the mission begins. Capra restores power to the spacecraft so the hackers can get to work, each operating different computer terminals on separate levels of the ship and communicating through virtual headsets.

The system enters lockdown, trapping the entire crew aboard the vessel. With Capra trapped alongside the hackers and nowhere to go, he decides to explore the ship. Upon finding a medical bay, Capra straps himself into an arm receptacle to test his blood pressure. His arm becomes trapped and a needle appears, while the AI system materialises in front of him. Capra is then injected with Nanotech material that transforms him into a killing machine acting on behalf of the AI.

Kaida and James begin to experience the AI system's illusions. Meanwhile, Mel and Lara, who are secret lovers, are tricked by the AI system and lured into danger. Samson, who is afraid of rats, sets a trap for one, which leads to the AI system trapping him, when Capra suddenly appears. Diondra links into the AI system to reboot it, but the AI program tempts her with a data storage cube containing bank account information from the spacecraft's former crew, all of whom mysteriously disappeared. Diondra is led into a sewage pipe, where a decayed corpse appears. She kicks it down the pipe and discovers that the cube is on the body. As Diondra follows the corpse to retrieve the cube, the AI system locks the door behind her and floods the pipe with sewage.

Mel, James, and Kaida reunite after experiencing the strange events caused by the AI system. Mel argues with Kaida, while James defends her, before Capra appears and attacks the hackers. Kaida manages to kill Capra by closing the airlock on him.

James is wounded and left unconscious, while Kaida is drawn into the AI system simulation. There, she confronts the AI's central system and fights it. Eventually, Kaida destroys the AI but finds herself unable to escape. James is later shown awakening, with he and Kaida revealed to be the only survivors.

In the final scene, James is no longer a prisoner but an admiral aboard the same spacecraft, while Kaida now exists within the virtual world as the AI operating system. Together, they oversee a new flight with a new crew.

== Cast ==
- Jeananne Goossen as Kaida, the lead programmer
- Adrian Holmes as Capra, the corrections officer in charge of the group of hackers
- Adam Butcher as James McKay, the youngest member of the group of hackers
- Kerr Hewitt (credited as Kjartan Hewitt) as Mel Wheeler, an expert in computers and the leader of the group
- Kyle Mac as Samson Connoly, the rebel of the group who is also afraid of rats
- Sidney Leeder as Lara Riley, a young woman who is also a convicted eco-terrorist and who is later revealed to have feelings for Mel Wheeler
- Jadyn Wong as Diondra Tam
- Jason Momoa as Iam, the ship's psychopathic AI who ends up turning the group of hackers against each other
- Tenika Davis as the unnamed Female Prisoner seen at the beginning of the film
- Kate Hewlett as Accounting Program

== Production ==
Writer-director Hewlett was inspired by Stanley Kubrick's 2001: A Space Odyssey, which he saw as a child. Hewlett said that he wanted to make a film from the point of view of HAL 9000, the antagonist of that story. This idea was eventually rejected as too artistic, and the plot was retooled to be more similar to Final Destination. Hewlett said that he did not see HAL 9000 as evil, and he designed Iam to be defending his right to exist. Hewlett intentionally cast Momoa as the ship's AI against type. Momoa wanted to do a project different than his traditional roles, and Hewlett was impressed with Momoa's creativity and range; the two men had previously worked together on the sci-fi series Stargate Atlantis. Although there were concerns about the AI's name, Iam, Hewlett settled the disputes by stating that names are inherently subjective.

Production took place at Pinewood Toronto Studios, and was scheduled to run from 14 February to 8 March. Producer Steve Hoban, who previously collaborated with Hewlett on Vincenzo Natali's films, described it as "Final Destination meets Cube". In September 2014, Shock Till You Drop reported that it had completed production and was awaiting distribution.

== Release ==
Signature Entertainment released Debug in the UK on 3 November 2014. Entertainment One distributed the film in Canada. Ketchup released it on DVD in the US on June 9, 2015.

== Reception ==
Charles Packer of Sci Fi Online rated it 7/10 stars and wrote that the film is unoriginal but worth a watch. Joel Harley of HorrorTalk rated it 2/5 stars and described it as "essentially a low-budget 2001: A Space Odyssey for people who want none of the art, story or believable special effects (or three hour runtime) that go hand-in-hand with Kubrick's classic." Brad Wheeler of The Globe and Mail rated it 0/5 stars and said it "falls short of even its modest budget". Calum Marsh of the National Post rated it 1.5/4 stars and wrote it lacks Cube's wit. Bruce DeMara of The Toronto Star rated it 2.5/4 stars and wrote, "Writer/director David Hewlett's feature film debut, Debug, has some dazzling ideas and visuals but falters in the end." Jim Slotek of The Toronto Sun praised the film's production values but said the execution and story were "machinelike". Randall King of the Winnipeg Free Press wrote that the film's plot might have worked 20 years ago, but the film only serves to devalue Canadian exploitation films now.
