= Perfect Pie (film) =

- Perfect Pie DVD cover
- Directed by: Barbara Willis Sweete
- Written by: Judith Thompson
- Produced by: Niv Fichman
- Starring: Wendy Crewson; Barbara Williams; Alison Pill; Rachel McAdams; Jennifer Pisana; Brittany Bristow; Alex Campbell; Tom McCamus
- Cinematography: Paul Sarossy
- Edited by: David Wharnsby
- Music by: Alexina Louie; Alex Pauk
- Production company: Rhombus Media
- Release date: September 10, 2002 (TIFF)
- Running time: 92 minutes
- Country: Canada
- Language: English

Perfect Pie is a 2002 Canadian film directed by Barbara Willis Sweete from a script by Judith Thompson. The screenplay was based on Thompson's play of the same name and stars Wendy Crewson, Barbara Williams, Alison Pill, and Rachel McAdams.

The film concerns the friendship of childhood best friends Patsy Willets and Marie Beck who reunite after a separation of 30 years.

The film premiered at the 2002 Toronto International Film Festival.

== Summary ==
Famed opera singer Francesca Prine, born Marie Beck, (Barbara Williams) receives an invitation to return to her hometown of Marmora, Ontario and sing in a charity concert from her former best friend Patsy Willets (Wendy Crewson). The two friends have not seen each other in thirty years after a train accident injured them both.

In flashbacks, we see Marie and Patsy's friendship evolve. As a child Marie is bullied but is nevertheless befriended by Patsy who frequently invites her to her home. Patsy notices that Marie is poor and is neglected by her alcoholic, abusive mother. Patsy and her mother do their best to help Marie and teach her to play the piano and sing, which Marie takes to naturally.

As the girls turn into teens, the bullying grows worse, and Marie is sexually harassed by local boys. Marie asks Patsy for help identifying the reason behind the bullying and is dismayed when Patsy points out her poor hygiene.

Marie develops a crush on Don Rayford, a pianist she meets at church who immediately recognizes her enormous talent as the two prepare for the local Kiwanis Music Festival. Encouraged by Patsy, Marie asks Don to a Sadie Hawkins dance and he accepts.

The night of the dance, Patsy helps Marie prepare though she is unable to attend herself as she is sick. Marie's mother calls the house in a drunken rage to tell Marie not to be a slut which Marie mocks as she has never even kissed a boy. Things with Don go well at the dance until he drunkenly leaves Marie. Confused Marie leaves the dance and is gang raped by several of her bullies. She makes her way to Patsy who attempts to call for help but is unable to because the phone is a partyline. Marie then attempts suicide by going to the train tracks. Patsy initially tries to save her before being hypnotized by the light of the oncoming train; she is ultimately saved by Marie who manages to pull her away, though not before she is somewhat injured by the train.

In the present, Francesca and Patsy struggle to reconnect as Patsy is in awe of Francesca's celebrity and wild lifestyle whereas Francesca seems to look down on her small life as a housewife. The other townspeople also treat Francesca like a celebrity, even though they bullied her as a child. Both Francesca and Patsy bear scars from their childhood; Francesca is prone to panic attacks and Patsy has developed seizures from her injuries from the train. To reconcile themselves the two friends go back to the train tracks where they remember the night of the accident. Each woman reveals that they credits the other with having saved their life.

== Cast ==
- Wendy Crewson as Patsy Willets
  - Rachel McAdams as Patsy Willets - Age 15
  - Brittany Bristow as Patsy Willets - Age 10
- Barbara Williams as Marie Beck / Francesca Prine
  - Alison Pill as Marie Beck - Age 15
  - Jennifer Pisana as Marie Beck - Age 10
- Tom McCamus as Don Rayford
  - Alex Campbell as Young Don Rayford
- Kim Schraner as Cindy
- Noah Shebib as Dunford
- Jackie Laidlaw as Patsy's Mother
- Trevor Bain as Patsy's Husband
- Eli Ham as Thug #1
- John Dewey as Thug #2
- Johnny Goltz as Thug #3
