= Alex Campbell (actor) =

Canadian actor

- Born: May 4, 1984 (age 42); Toronto, Ontario, Canada
- Occupations: Actor, drummer
- Years active: 1996–present
- Relatives: Neve Campbell (sister); Christian Campbell (brother)

Alex Campbell (born May 4, 1984) is a Canadian actor and drummer. He is known for playing Emil Hoffman in the television drama Little Men (1998–1999), for roles in the films Don't Say a Word (2001) and Dreamcatcher (2003), and for his starring role in the black comedy Siblings (2004).

== Early life ==
Campbell was born in Toronto on May 4, 1984. His father, Gerry Campbell, is a theatre director and drama teacher. His mother was Martha Newland, daughter of Clinton, Ontario physician Frank McDiarmid Newland. (Note: Tribute.ca, Northernstars.ca and other online profiles wrongly list Marnie Neve as Campbell's mother. Marnie Neve is the mother of Neve and Christian Campbell. Campbell's mother is Martha Newland.) He is the younger brother of actors Neve Campbell and Christian Campbell, with whom he shares a father. Like his sister, he trained at Canada's National Ballet School, where he studied for three years.

== Career ==
Campbell wanted to act from a young age and began working at 11, after an introduction from his godfather. His first television role was as "Vampire Boy" in the 1996 Goosebumps episode "The Haunted Mask II", followed by a role on the Canadian series Riverdale. In 1998 he was cast as Emil Hoffman, a student at the Plumfield school who hopes to become a sailor, in Little Men, a continuation of Louisa May Alcott's novel. The series aired on PAX TV in the United States and on CTV in Canada for two seasons.

In 2001 Campbell played Jonathan in the thriller Don't Say a Word, starring Michael Douglas, and guest-starred on the Disney Channel series The Famous Jett Jackson. In 2002 he had a supporting role in the CTV television film Verdict in Blood and a small part in the feature Perfect Pie. He played Richie Grenadeau in Dreamcatcher (2003), the film adaptation of the Stephen King novel.

Campbell's first starring role came in David Weaver's black comedy Siblings (2004), in which he played Joe, the brooding eldest of four step-siblings, alongside Sarah Gadon, Samantha Weinstein, Nicholas Campbell, Sonja Smits and Sarah Polley. The film screened at the 2004 Vancouver International Film Festival, and Campbell said he auditioned four times for the part. His later television work includes the series Beautiful People (2005) and the CBC drama 11 Cameras (2006).

== Music ==
Campbell is the drummer of the Toronto rock band You Handsome Devil, formed in 2004, alongside guitarist Jeremy Sachedina and bassist Steve McCarthy. The band released the albums The Hell, You Say (2011) and Ragnarök 'n Roll (2018), both recorded at Orange Lounge Studios in Toronto. Ragnarök 'n Roll features guest vocals by Jacqueline Martin. The band performed at Cherry Cola's in Toronto on June 13, 2013, as part of the North by Northeast festival. A review of the show in The Scene Magazine scored it 9 out of 10.

== Filmography ==
=== Film ===
Year	Title	Role	Notes
1999	A Saintly Switch	Billy	Television film
2001	Don't Say a Word	Jonathan	
2002	Verdict in Blood	Eli Rollins	Television film
2002	Perfect Pie	Don Rayford (age 15)	
2003	Dreamcatcher	Richie Grenadeau	
2004	Siblings	Joe	Lead role

=== Television ===
Year	Title	Role	Notes
1996	Goosebumps	Vampire Boy	Episode: "The Haunted Mask II"
1997	Riverdale	Patrick MacKenzie	
1998–1999	Little Men	Emil Hoffman	Main role
2001	The Famous Jett Jackson	Lucas	Guest role
2005	Beautiful People	Matt	2 episodes
2006	11 Cameras	Colin	
2007	Urban Legends		1 episode
