= Jadyn Wong =

Canadian actress

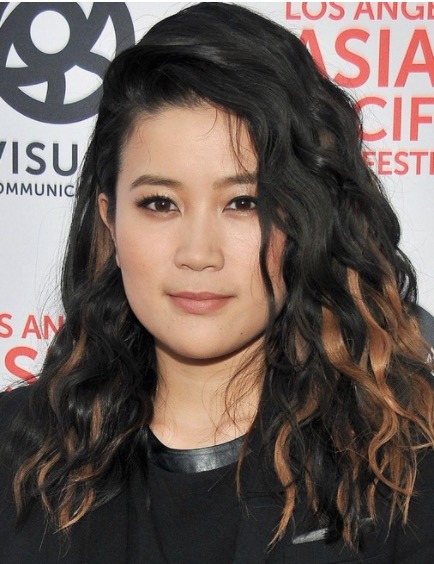
- Wong at the 33rd LAAPFF in 2017
- Born: Medicine Hat, Alberta, Canada
- Occupation: Actress
- Years active: 2006–present

Jadyn Wong is a Canadian-American actress, best known for playing mechanical prodigy Happy Quinn on the CBS show Scorpion.

== Early life and education ==
Wong was born in Medicine Hat, Alberta, Canada, to immigrants from Hong Kong. She completed her Bachelor of Commerce at the University of British Columbia. She has a black belt in karate and is also a classical pianist.

== Career ==
Wong made her professional acting debut in the miniseries Broken Trail (2006) with Robert Duvall. She was handpicked for the role by Duvall after hundreds of actresses were auditioned across North America.

She also appeared in Space Buddies (2009) as a Chinese reporter, as April Jung in the short film The Letters (2010), as a Money Channel Interviewer in Cosmopolis (2012), as Diondra in Debug (2014), and as Molly in the TV movie Client Seduction (2014). In 2016, she played Altagracia in You're Killing Me Susana.

From 2014 to 2018, Wong starred in the CBS television series Scorpion as Happy Quinn. In 2018, she joined the cast of Needle in a Timestack, a science fiction film written and directed by John Ridley.

== Filmography ==
=== Film ===
| Year | Title | Role | Notes |
|---|---|---|---|
| 2009 | Space Buddies | Chinese Reporter | |
| 2010 | The Letters | April Jung | Short film |
| 2012 | Cosmopolis | Money Channel Interviewer | |
| 2014 | Debug | Diondra | |
| 2016 | You're Killing Me Susana | Altagracia | |
| 2021 | Needle in a Timestack | Zoe Mikkelsen | |
| 2023 | Weak Layers | Lucy Lin | |

=== Television ===
| Year | Title | Role | Notes |
|---|---|---|---|
| 2006 | Broken Trail | Ghee Moon (#1) | Mini-series |
| 2010 | Caprica | Game master | 2 episodes |
| 2011 | Rookie Blue | Mary Vu | Episode: "Brotherhood" |
| 2011 | Being Erica | Rachel | 6 episodes |
| 2011 | Stay with Me | Li | Unaired CTV pilot |
| 2014 | Lost Girl | Dao Ming | Episode: "Destiny's Child" |
| 2014 | Working the Engels | Shirl | Episode: "Pilot" |
| 2014 | Spun Out | Esther Wing | Episode: "Carpoolers" |
| 2014 | Client Seduction | Molly | TV film |
| 2014–2018 | Scorpion | Happy Quinn | Main cast (93 episodes) |
