= 11 Cameras =

Canadian drama television series

- Genre: Drama
- Created by: Jeff Spriet; James Wilkes
- Starring: Jeff Roop; Ashley Leggat; Barbara Radecki; Mayko Nguyen; Joris Jarsky; Terra Vnesa; Alan Van Sprang; Dillon Casey; Leah Cudmore; Deanna Dezmari; Deborah Grover; Kate Hewlett; Alex Campbell; Jazz Mann; Yogesh Chotalia
- Country of origin: Canada
- No. of seasons: 1
- No. of episodes: 22

Production
- Running time: 30 minutes

Original release
- Network: CBC Television
- Release: June 28 – September 7, 2006

11 Cameras is a Canadian drama television series that aired on CBC Television. It premiered on June 28, 2006 and showed its characters through webcams. CBC ordered 22 episodes in total, and did not renew the show for a second season. Endemol secured the format rights for the show internationally.

The series was created by Chokolat and co-produced with Shaftesbury Films and Henry Less Productions.

== Cast and characters ==
=== Main cast ===
- Jeff Roop as Nick: Husband of Tiffany and son of Glady, he is working overseas with the military (located in Iraq).
- Ashley Leggat as Kelly: Daughter of Paula, friend of Milan, is angry about her parents impending divorce but still craves their attention, acts up when she does not get it.
- Barbara Radecki as Paula: Mother of Kelly, is going through divorce proceedings with Tony, ex-girlfriend.
- Mayko Nguyen as Sarah: Met Sumesh in residence (still in school) and is now his girlfriend, she is starting to wonder why she has not been introduced to Sumesh's parents.
- Jessica Greco as Tiffany: Wife of Nick and daughter-in-law of Gladys Lives with Gladys and takes care of her. Is currently pregnant and supplements the family income by working from home as an esthetician.
- Joris Jarsky as Richard: Fiance of Irina, is an independent consultant working for Andrea.
- Terra Vnesa as Honey: Girlfriend of Chuck, friends with Serenity and Bruce, is attending college and thinks she is short of funds.
- Alan Van Sprang as Bruce: Ex-boyfriend of Paula, employer of Sumesh, meets Honey through the Internet.
- Dillon Casey as Chuck: Friend of Colin, boyfriend of Honey, has trouble dealing with change due to his small-town mentality.
- Leah Cudmore as Amber: Girlfriend of Colin.
- Deanna Dezmari as Irina: Fiance of Richard (located in Russia).
- Deborah Grover as Gladys: Mother of Nick, seldom seen without a cigarette, always looking to make a big score but somewhat lacking in judgement. Resents the attention Nick pays to Tiffany and is terrified of being put into a home.
- Kate Hewlett as Andrea: Richard's employer, makes every effort to accommodate him due to her secret crush on him.
- Alex Campbell as Colin: Boyfriend of Amber (but has recently realized that he is gay), friend of Honey and Chuck, works in a convenience store, meets Matt and Evan on the Internet.
- Jazz Mann as Raj: Brother of Sumesh (located in India).
- Yogesh Chotalia as Sumesh: Indian student who has just finished his architecture degree using funds from his future father-in-law Dinesh. Is now working on a project for Bruce. Is dating Sarah, despite being engaged to Rohini. Calls India frequently to talk with his brother Raj, his father Samir and his mother Asha.

=== Recurring cast and guest stars ===
- Jeananne Goossen as Serenity: Friend of Honey who encourages her to make some extra money on the Internet.
- Adrian Roberto as Trevor: Friend of Colin, Chuck and Zak.
- Malika Mendez as Asha: Mother of Raj and Sumesh (located in India).
- Marvin Ishmael as Dinesh Desh Pandu: Father of Rohini (located in India).
- Kashif Khan as Benny: Friend of Sumesh and Raj (located in India).
- Colin Doyle as Doug
- Evan: Friend Colin meets on the Internet.
- Mishu Vellani as Georgia
- Mak Fyfe as Liam: "Bad boy" character who attracts Kelly.
- Tim Sell as Martinez: Works with Nick, sometimes chats with Tiffany when Nick is out (located in Iraq).
- Brandon Carrera as Matt: Friend Colin meets on the Internet.
- Kristina Pesic as Milan: Friend Kelly meets on her new street.
- Natasha Chandel as Rohini Desh Pandu: Engaged to Sumesh (located in India).
- Errol Sitahal as Samir: Father of Raj and Sumesh (located in India).
- Tony: Father of Kelly and separated from Paula, addicted to his cellphone.
- Kerr Hewitt as Zak: Friend of Colin, Chuck and Trevor.
