= Svarog Films =

Russian film company

Svarog Films (Сварог Фильм)
- Company type: Corporation
- Industry: Motion pictures
- Founded: 1998
- Headquarters: Saint Petersburg, Russia
- Key people: Nikolay Suslov (C.E.O.)
- Products: Motion pictures Television programs
- Website: http://www.svarog-film.com/

Svarog Films (Russian: Сварог Фильм) is a Russian independent film company founded in 1998 in St.Petersburg. In 2007 Svarog Films entered into a Russian-American co-production for the film Kerosene Cowboys, set for release in 2009.

== Projects ==
- Empire under Strike (Империя по ударом),
- Spetznaz, (Спецназ)
- Russian Spetznaz, (Русский Спецназ)
- Spetznaz-2, (Спецназ-2)
- Russian Spetznaz-2, (Спецназ по-русски - 2)
- Golden Meduza, (Золотая медуза)
- Polumgla, (Полумгла)
- The SUN, (Солнце)
- Elegy of Life. Rostropovich, Vishnevskaya.,
- 1812

== Awards ==
- TEFI – Russian National TV award, Best TV film nomination, 2001
- International stunt festival "PROMETHEUS", Best stunt film of the year, 2002
- Golden Eagle Award – Russian National cinema award, Best film of the year, 2003
- TEFI – Russian National TV award, Best TV film nomination, 2003
- «LAW & SOCIETY» – International film festival, First Prise, 2003
- "PIXEL" – National VFX and computer arts festival, Best film computer graphics and VFX, 2003
- "PIXEL" – National VFX and computer arts festival, Audience sympathy prise, 2003
- «LAW & SOCIETY» – International film festival, First Prise, 2004
- International stunt festival "PROMETHEUS", Best stunt film of the year, 2004
