= Diablo (2015 film) =

2015 film

- Theatrical release poster
- Directed by: Lawrence Roeck
- Screenplay by: Carlos De Los Rios
- Story by: Lawrence Roeck
- Produced by: Shana D. Wilson; Lawrence Roeck; Carlos De Los Rios
- Starring: Scott Eastwood; Walton Goggins; Camilla Belle; José Zúñiga; Danny Glover; Adam Beach; Joaquim de Almeida; Tzi Ma
- Cinematography: Dean Cundey
- Edited by: Kyle Sanborn
- Music by: Timothy Williams
- Production companies: SDW Media Group; Space Rock Studios
- Distributed by: Orion Pictures
- Release dates: October 2, 2015 (San Diego Film Festival); January 8, 2016 (United States)
- Running time: 90 minutes
- Countries: United States; Canada
- Language: English

Diablo is a 2015 revisionist Western psychological thriller film produced, co-written and directed by Lawrence Roeck, and starring Scott Eastwood, Walton Goggins, Camilla Belle and Danny Glover. It was the first western film starring Scott Eastwood, the younger son of Western icon Clint Eastwood.

It was released on January 8, 2016, by Orion Pictures and Momentum Pictures.

== Plot ==
A man named Jackson wakes to find his home and barn burning; Mexican bandits have taken his wife. He manages to shoot one before he tries to dig something up in his barn, but is overcome by smoke. The next morning, neighbors wake him. He retrieves the package from the night before and informs them that he is setting out South in search of the bandits.

Along the trail he finds the dying man he shot. The man gives him no information but calls him "damned" and dies. Jackson finds two silver pieces on the man and continues on. One morning he goes to get water, and a Native American shoots two arrows at him. When Jackson flanks the position, he finds a cowering boy, whom he runs off.

Shortly thereafter, Jackson encounters a Chinese man repairing a wagon who pulls a shotgun and demands a toll of 5 silver pieces. A stranger named Ezra appears behind the Chinese man and shoots him. After a cryptic exchange, Jackson fights Ezra, but when he retrieves his gun to shoot him, he has vanished. Further along the trail, Jackson is caught in the open by the Mexicans, and is shot. He struggles along but eventually collapses from his wound and infection. Ezra manages to find him again and claims he will stay with him to watch him die. When Jackson awakes, Ezra is gone, and the Native American boy drags him to his village.

After medical treatment, Jackson awakes. The Native Americans decide to test him with peyote to see if he is "evil" or not. Jackson runs from their sweat lodge hallucinating, and sees his maimed dead brother in a Union uniform. He asks Jackson why he shot him and suggests he should kill himself. The Native Americans catch up with Jackson and he comes to his senses; they force him to leave. The boy gives him his horse and Jackson tries to give the boy his gun, but the others run him off. As soon as Jackson sets off, however, Ezra appears and kills the two adults as the boy escapes.

Jackson arrives at the home of Mr. Carver, with whom he served in the Civil War 7 years prior, and asks for a saddle and water for his horse. Carver sends Jackson to a shed and tells his granddaughter Rebecca that Jackson is extremely dangerous; he loads a shotgun and tells her to run if anything happens. Carver suggests that Jackson is not well because of the accident with his brother and tells him once he has the water he must go. When Jackson returns from the stream, Ezra has Carver at gunpoint. During the standoff, it's revealed that Ezra is actually Jackson, who has some kind of traumatic personality disorder. He murders Carver and leaves.

Jackson finally catches up with the Mexicans, but when he reaches his wife Alexsandra, she flees from him. He chases them to their homestead, where he kills several men and Alexsandra takes cover. Finally he reaches Alexsandra alone and she reveals that their "love" was his fantasy and she is staying with her husband (one of the bandits). She kisses Jackson to distract him while she draws his gun and shoots him with his last bullet. He pushes his way outside to encounter Guillermo, her real husband, and the screen blacks as a shot sounds.

== Cast ==
- Scott Eastwood as Jackson
- Walton Goggins as Ezra
- Camilla Belle as Alexsandra
- José Zúñiga as Guillermo
- Danny Glover as Benjamin Carver
- Nesta Cooper as Rebecca Carver
- Adam Beach as Nakoma
- Samuel Marty as Ishani
- Joaquim de Almeida as Arturo
- Tzi Ma as Quok Mi
- Rohan Campbell as Robert

== Release ==
The film was released at the San Diego film festival on October 2, 2015.

.

== Critical reception ==
The film was panned by critics. On Rotten Tomatoes, the film has a "Rotten" 19% rating, based on 21 reviews, with an average rating of 3.47/10. On Metacritic, the film has a score of 35 out of 100, based on 9 reviews, indicating "generally unfavorable" reviews.

The AV Club calls it "[t]edious despite its brief running time." Odie Henderson at RogerEbert.com writes that the film "goes for shock value with its twists, but plays its hand far too early. Our knowledge of events and of character force us to question why the people in the climactic scenes act as stupid as they do." And Variety says: "The twist...isn't without promise.... Yet it's nonetheless clumsily handled, and the last stretch of the film goes south in a hurry."

=== Accolades ===
Diablo won the Best Narrative Feature award at the San Diego International Film Festival in 2015.
