= Nikolay Suslov =

Nikolay Suslov (Николай Суслов)
- Born: 8 September 1969 (age 56); Leningrad, USSR
- Education: Moscow State Institute of International Relations, Doctor of Law
- Occupations: Film producer and writer

Nikolay Andreevich Suslov (Russian: Николай Андреевич Суслов; born September 8, 1969, in Leningrad, USSR), is a Russian film producer and writer. Graduated from Moscow State Institute of International Relations of Ministry of Foreign Affairs, Doctor of Law, 1992).

Since 1998 he is a film producer and CEO/owner of Svarog Films company.

== Film credits ==
- Empire under Strike (Империя по ударом), – Producer.
- Spetznaz, (Спецназ) – Producer, Writer.
- Russian Spetznaz, (Русский Спецназ) – Producer, Writer, Stunts Supervisor.
- Spetznaz-2, (Спецназ-2) – Producer, Writer.
- Russian Spetznaz-2, (Спецназ по-русски – 2)- Producer, Writer, Stunts Supervisor.
- Golden Meduza, (Золотая медуза) – Producer, Writer.
- Polumgla, (Полумгла) – VFX Producer.
- The SUN, (Солнце) – VFX Producer.
- Elegy of Life. Rostropovich, Vishnevskaya., – Co-Producer.
- 1812, – Producer, writer, Stunt Supervisor.
- Red Sky – Producer, Writer.

== Awards ==
- TEFI – Russian National TV award, Best TV film nomination, 2001
- International stunt festival "PROMETHEUS", Best stunt film of the year, 2002
- Golden Eagle Award – Russian National cinema award, Best film of the year, 2003
- TEFI – Russian National TV award, Best TV film nomination, 2003
- "LAW & SOCIETY" – International film festival, First Prise, 2003
- "PIXEL" – National VFX and computer arts festival, Best film computer graphics and VFX, 2003
- "PIXEL" – National VFX and computer arts festival, Audience sympathy prise, 2003
- «LAW & SOCIETY» – International film festival, First Prise, 2004
- International stunt festival "PROMETHEUS", Best stunt film of the year, 2004
