= Kate Hewlett =

Canadian actress (born 1976)

- Hewlett in 2026
- Born: Katherine Emily Hewlett; December 17, 1976 (age 49); Toronto, Ontario, Canada
- Years active: 1999–present
- Height: 5 ft 6 in (1.68 m)
- Relatives: David Hewlett (brother)

Katherine Emily Hewlett (born December 17, 1976) is a Canadian actress, playwright and songwriter. She has written two plays: Humans Anonymous (2006) and the stage musical The Swearing Jar (2008), for which she wrote both the book and songs. The Swearing Jar was turned into a 2022 film musical of the same name, for which Hewlett won the Canadian Screen Award for Best Original Song for the song "The Swearing Song".

== Biography ==
Hewlett was born in 1976 in Toronto, Ontario, Canada.

Hewlett has worked in television, film and theatre. Her brother is actor David Hewlett, who portrayed Rodney McKay in Stargate Atlantis. She guest-starred as McKay's sister, Jeannie Miller, in four episodes on the series. She also co-starred with him, again as his sister, in the film A Dog's Breakfast (2006), which he wrote and directed.

Hewlett wrote the play Humans Anonymous, which premiered in 2006 at the Toronto Fringe Festival, where it won 'Best of Fringe' and 'Best Ensemble'. She also starred in the play, alongside Philip Graeme. The play was then produced off-Broadway in 2007, with Hewlett and Graeme reprising their roles.

She wrote both the book and the music for the musical The Swearing Jar, which premiered in 2008 at the Toronto Fringe Festival. It was awarded 'Best of Fringe' and 'Best Ensemble' at the 2008 Toronto Fringe Festival, then 'Outstanding New Play' at the 2010 New York International Fringe Festival. The play was published in print in 2013, and was a finalist for the Governor General's Award for English-language drama that year.

In 2012, Hewlett was cast in the Canadian teen drama series Degrassi: The Next Generation as Margaret Matlin, a role she played until 2014. In 2013, she starred in Jeremy Lalonde's low-budget comedy feature film Sex After Kids.

From 2015 to 2016, Hewlett appeared in the comedy television series The Stanley Dynamic as Lisa Stanley, the mother of the Stanley family. In the episode 'The Stanley Astronaut', she once again worked alongside her brother David.

Hewlett guest-starred in the 2016 Starz series The Girlfriend Experience, based on Steven Soderbergh's film of the same name.

Hewlett played the role of Mayor Flaherty in the TV show Holly Hobbie in 2018.

Her musical The Swearing Jar was adapted as a musical film, The Swearing Jar, in 2022. Hewlett won the Canadian Screen Award for Best Original Song at the 11th Canadian Screen Awards in 2023 for "The Swearing Song", a song from The Swearing Jar.

== Filmography ==
=== Film ===
Year	Title	Role	Notes
1999	Loose Change	Erin	
2005	Dark Water	Teacher's Aide	
2005	Four Minutes	Helen	TV film
2007	A Dog's Breakfast	Marilyn	
2009	The Last New Year	Catherine	
2010	She Said Lenny	Jenny	Short film
2012	Jesus Henry Christ	Alice O'Hara	
2013	Sex After Kids	Jody	
2013	Still Life: A Three Pines Mystery	Clara Morrow	TV film
2013	Everything Must Go	Andrea	Short film
2014	Debug	Accounting Program	
2015	Deadfall	The Woman	Short film
2018	The Go-Getters	Nurse	
2018	Committed-ish	Cara	Short film
2019	All About Who You Know	Margot	
2021	Beast Mode 6ix	Sue the Bear	Short film
TBA	A Christmas Charade	Patty	Post-production

=== Television ===
Year	Title	Role	Notes
2004	Kevin Hill	Teacher	"Making the Grade"
2006	11 Cameras	Andrea	19 episodes
2006–2008	Stargate Atlantis	Jeannie Miller	4 episodes
2008	Psych	Stacy	"There's something about Mira"
2010, 2017	Murdoch Mysteries	Lucy Worthing / Daphne Linney	2 episodes
2010	Flashpoint	Heather Sobol	"Jumping at Shadows"
2011	InSecurity	Kathy	"The Ligerian Candidate"
2011	Fancy	Maureen	
2012	Republic of Doyle	Erin Riggs	"Dead Man Talking"
2012	The L.A. Complex	Andrea	3 episodes
2012–2014	Degrassi: The Next Generation	Margaret Matlin	16 episodes
2014	Degrassi: Minis	Margaret Matlin	"Dress You Up, Part 3"
2014	Saving Hope	Sarah	"Twinned Lambs"
2014	Working the Engels	Chelsea	"Jenna vs. The Momfia"
2014–2015	Remedy	Nicole Foster	5 episodes
2015–2017	The Stanley Dynamic	Lisa Stanley	50 episodes
2016–2017	Degrassi: Next Class	Margaret Matlin	5 episodes
2016	The Girlfriend Experience	Sarah	6 episodes
2016–2017	The Beaverton	Crime Scene Interiors / Plan C	3 episodes
2018–2019	Holly Hobbie	Mayor Flaherty	8 episodes
2018–2019	Big Top Academy	Madame Q	3 episodes
2019	Frankie Drake Mysteries	Edith Paltry	"School Ties, School Lies"
2021	The Parker Andersons/Amelia Parker	Cleo Anderson	Series lead
2022	Overlord and the Underwoods	Nikola Holmes	Voice; "Overlock Holmes and the undercooked pie"
2023	Run the Burbs	The Part-Time Nun	2 episodes

== See also ==
- David Hewlett
