= Needle in a Timestack =

- Theatrical release poster
- Directed by: John Ridley
- Written by: John Ridley
- Based on: "Needle in a Timestack" by Robert Silverberg
- Produced by: Zanne Devine; Aaron L. Gilbert; Matt Kennedy; David Thwaites
- Starring: Leslie Odom Jr.; Freida Pinto; Cynthia Erivo; Orlando Bloom; Jadyn Wong
- Cinematography: Ramsey Nickell
- Edited by: Luyen Vu
- Music by: Mark Isham
- Production companies: Bron Studios; Pacific Northwest Pictures; Ember20; International Famous Players Radio Picture Corporation
- Distributed by: Lionsgate
- Release date: October 15, 2021
- Running time: 111 minutes
- Country: United States
- Language: English

Needle in a Timestack is a 2021 American romantic science fiction film written and directed by John Ridley, based on the short story of the same name by Robert Silverberg. The film stars Leslie Odom Jr., Freida Pinto, Cynthia Erivo, Orlando Bloom, and Jadyn Wong. Needle in a Timestack was released in the United States on October 15, 2021, by Lionsgate.

== Plot ==
In the near future, "time jaunting" (time travel) is possible for the very rich. Time shifts that result from these time jumps are commonplace, and whole industries have risen up to help people store their memories.

Nick Mikkelsen, an architect, is married to Janine, a photographer. They seem happy, but after being struck by the third time shift in a year, Nick starts to feel something is off. He suspects they previously had a dog, whereas now they have a cat. He blames the shifting on Janine's ex-husband Tommy (also a college friend of Nick's), who he thinks is changing the past to get Janine back. Janine is no longer in love with Tommy but she is getting annoyed with Nick's obsession with him. Nick goes to see Tommy to "catch up" but also to find out if he has been messing with the past. Tommy does not reveal if he is, but says he wishes things had gone differently in his marriage. Nick starts to store his memories in one of the memory companies in preparation for future time shifts. Nick's sister Zoe tells Nick that her partner Sabila died in a rock climbing accident.

Nick tells Janine he is going to see Tommy but then he discovers she also went to see him. After being mad at each other for a few days, Nick asks Janine to go away with him, to just keep traveling until there are no places left. She agrees, but as they are leaving, a huge time shift flows over them. Nick suddenly finds himself driving in a car, alone. He immediately tries to call Janine, who is not in his contact list, and he cannot find her by her maiden name either. A few minutes later, Janine calls Nick, and tells him they were married and had a cat, but she cannot remember where they lived. She says she has been with Tommy for nine years; Tommy was successful in changing the past. Nick lets his car take him home, and he is now married to Alex. Alex can sense that Nick is different, but over time he seems to "remember" their life together, he says the same sweet things to Alex that he had said to Janine. Zoe tells Nick that her partner, Sabila, is alive again, but later admits that she actually had died, but she paid all her money to time jaunt and change the past so Sabila would not go rock climbing that day.

Nick decides to time jaunt to a time 13 years prior in an effort to make things right. In the past, he tells Tommy that he is breaking up with Alex, and persuades him to go after her. He leaves a note for himself in the past, saying Alex has fallen in love with Tommy, and not to worry but he will find the person he is meant to be with, and he will know her just by looking at her.

Nick comes back to the present to find he lives alone, and apparently he has been very withdrawn. Zoe calls Tommy, who calls Nick and convinces him to attend a party. Everyone there says they are happy at how everything has turned out for all of them, and that they have missed Nick. As Nick starts to leave, he sees Janine, there as a photographer for the party. Their eyes meet, and something inside of both of them knows: there is something between them. Nick turns to leave again, but he stops himself.

== Cast ==
- Leslie Odom Jr. as Nick Mikkelsen
- Freida Pinto as Alex Leslie
- Cynthia Erivo as Janine Mikkelsen
- Orlando Bloom as Tommy Hambleton
- Jadyn Wong as Zoe Mikkelsen
- Hiro Kanagawa as Tattersall
- Laysla De Oliveira as Sibila
- Alessandro Juliani as Steven

== Production ==
It was announced in April 2017 that John Ridley would write and direct a film based on Robert Silverberg's short story "Needle in a Timestack", with Miramax set to distribute. Miramax was no longer involved by June 2018, with Bron Studios taking over. Leslie Odom Jr., Freida Pinto, Cynthia Erivo, Orlando Bloom and Jadyn Wong were cast that same month.

Filming took place in Vancouver from June 18 to July 24, 2018. According to Silverberg, the film underwent more than a year of editing and re-editing.

== Release ==
The film was released in the United States on digital, video on demand, and in limited theaters by Lionsgate on October 15, 2021, and on Blu-ray Disc and DVD on October 19.

== Reception ==
On the review aggregator website Rotten Tomatoes, the film has an approval rating of 37%, based on 51 reviews. The website's consensus reads, "Despite a nifty premise and some talented stars, Needle in a Timestack is too slack and diffuse to recommend searching for." Metacritic, which uses a weighted average, assigned the film a score of 42 out of 100, based on 12 critics, indicating "mixed or average" reviews.
