= Spynet =

- Directed by: Michael Kinney
- Starring: Kim Schraner

Original release
- Network: CBC Television
- Release: February 25, 2002 – 2004

Spynet is a CBC Television children's show, which features Sam, played by Kim Schraner, as a spy operative for a fictional Canadian spy agency, the National Espionage Task-Force (NET). It started as an ultra-low budget segment, of short length, but increased modestly in budget and length, to a half-hour format. It aired on February 25, 2002 to 2004 and is directed by Michael Kinney

The episodes, built to be educational with a plot, vary in their content-action ratio.

== Show format ==
Originally, the show had only one visible regular, known under her code name of Sam. However, as the budget and length of the show increased, a number of recurring characters appeared, although the focus is still heavily on Sam. Sam works in a white, windowless van parked in an anonymous city, which she hops around, trying to stop crime. The van is filled with lots of high-tech spy gadgets and computer equipment. The show is mainly filmed in downtown Toronto, and makes great use of the CBC's extensive, private building, which many of the scenes are filmed in.

When started, the show had a fairly standard format, geared to education. Each episode, Pendleton's voice is heard over a speaker, introducing the mission. She talks briefly on what she expects from the mission; this is to encourage students to evaluate and plan. The mission will then lead to Sam calling up a training video or NET file archive interview, relating to the topic that the mission indirectly deals with. Often she, shows another clip, to continue the preparation. She then heads off on her mission, in which is acted normally without interaction with the viewer; another clip will then be shown, and she will wrap up her espionage. Back in the van, she reflects on the mission in her web-cam video diary; this is to encourage students to reflect on work and stories, and identify their mistakes or weaknesses. She then talks directly to the viewer once more, continuing to reflect, and wraps up the episode, usually drawing conclusions on the subject that the show was themed to.

The short documentary-like videos help give background information to the viewers, without Sam divulging a lecture on the topic. The videos cover both espionage tactics and historical applications of the concept that it highlighted in the episode. Highlighted topics range from bugs, internal spies, codes, hidden cameras and stealth devices.

However, as the show has expanded in length, it has moved closer to a typical spy drama, and is less focused on education, and more focused on entertainment.

== Characters ==
=== Sam ===
Sam (Kim Schraner) goes undercover as Lt. Hendrichs to capture an illegal arms dealer in the episode All You Can Be

Graduating at the top of her NET Spy School class, Sam is especially skilled at surveillance, hand to hand combat, disguise and radio/video operations.

Her parents disappeared without a trace when she was only eight years old, their whereabouts are unknown to Sam. She has, however, received a videotape of her father, wishing her good luck with her life. It was taped shortly before he was dispatched as on a new, top secret mission. With the vanishing of her family, she moved in with an aunt, uncle and two young cousins. All of this family has been continuously scrutinized by authorities for their criminal activities. Sam maintains very little contact with this family.

To prove her worth after failing the Armed Forces Black Ops training, she successfully enrolled with the National Espionage Taskforce. She is quite eager to prove herself, making her an excellent agent; however, this same attribute also causes her to threaten security, as she tasks many unnecessary risks. In the NET, she reports to Pendleton, her Field Operatives Supervisor.

Sam's personal life also plays a role in some episodes. One mission, she is to break into an independent spy/thief's house, in order to prove or debunk the suspicion that his children are also becoming involved in the illegal trade. The family will be away for 48 hours, so she has perfect opportunity to break into their house. She finds that it is actually her uncle's abode, and finds a video in one of the children's closets in an envelope. It contains a message from her father who she hasn't seen in years. He too is a spy, and the video wishes her all the best, as he knows that this may be their last contact as he parts on a long-term mission. This then allows her to somewhat emotionally divulge her childhood loneliness, which sent her into the spy industry. The whole mission, she concludes, was staged by her boss Pendelton, to allow her the chance to receive such a sensitive VHS video tape.

In one episode, Sam was investigating a clone. She ended up discovering the clone looked exactly like her. However, it was revealed that Sam may have been a clone.

One key element to this show is how Sam never uses weapons, like MacGyver. The enemy spies and terrorists use weapons whenever appropriate, but she either lets them escape or quickly disarms them.

=== Pendleton ===
Pendleton is a Field Operatives Supervisor for the NET. He assigns cases to his operatives, including Sam. He prides
