= John G. Lenic =

Croatian television producer and production manager

John G. Lenic (born October 11, 1974 in New Westminster, British Columbia) is a Canadian television producer and production manager. He is of Croatian descent.

== Filmography ==
- Deceived by Trust: A Moment of Truth Movie (1995) (TV) (assistant producer)
- Expert Witness (1996) (producer)
- Justice for Annie: A Moment of Truth Movie (1996) (TV) (assistant producer)
- When Friendship Kills (1996) (TV) (assistant producer)
- She Woke Up Pregnant (1996) (TV) (assistant producer)
- Abduction of Innocence (1996) (TV) (assistant producer)
- Stand Against Fear (1996) (TV) (assistant producer)
- Moment of Truth: Into the Arms of Danger (1997) (TV) (assistant producer)
- Nobody Lives Forever (1998) (TV) (assistant producer)
- A Dog's Breakfast (2007) (producer)
- Stargate SG-1 (2004-2007) (producer)
- Stargate: Atlantis (2007-2008) (producer)
- Stargate: The Ark of Truth (2008) (producer)
- Stargate: Continuum (2008) (producer)
- Altered Carbon (2018) (producer)
- Travelers (2019) (producer)
