= The Swearing Jar =

2022 Canadian film

- Film poster
- Directed by: Lindsay MacKay
- Written by: Kate Hewlett
- Produced by: Kyle Bornais; Jane Loughman; Tony Wosk
- Starring: Adelaide Clemens; Patrick J. Adams; Douglas Smith; Kathleen Turner
- Cinematography: Jordan Kennington
- Edited by: Lindsay Allikas
- Music by: Tim Williams with songs by Kate Hewlett
- Production companies: Monkeys & Parrots; Farpoint Films; Middle Child Films; MoJo Global Arts
- Distributed by: Levelfilm; Gravitas Ventures
- Release date: September 11, 2022 (TIFF)
- Running time: 111 minutes
- Country: Canada
- Language: English

The Swearing Jar is a 2022 Canadian romantic musical drama film, directed by Lindsay MacKay. Adapted from Kate Hewlett's musical play of the same name, the film stars Adelaide Clemens as Carey, a music teacher who stages a concert of music about their relationship as a birthday present for her husband Simon (Patrick J. Adams), only to be drawn into a dilemma when she also begins to fall in love with Owen (Douglas Smith), the guitarist she hired to help perform the concert.

The film's cast also includes Kathleen Turner as Simon's mother Bev, as well as David Hewlett, Jade Ma, Nadine Whiteman Roden, Athena Park, Izzi Nagel, Mary Grant, Matilda Legault, Isla Parekh, Randy Singh and Chris Tarpos in supporting roles.

The film was shot in Toronto and Hamilton, Ontario, in 2021.

The film premiered in the Contemporary World Cinema program at the 2022 Toronto International Film Festival on September 11, 2022.

Hewlett won the Canadian Screen Award for Best Original Song at the 11th Canadian Screen Awards in 2023 for the song "The Swearing Song".
