= Red Sky (2014 film) =

2014 film by Mario Van Peebles

- Promotional poster for the film
- Directed by: Mario Van Peebles
- Screenplay by: Adam Prince; Mario Van Peebles
- Story by: Nikolay Suslov; Dave Riggs
- Based on: Kerosene Cowboys: Manning the Spare by Randy Arrington
- Produced by: Yakov Bentsvi; Sergei Bespalov; Russell Gray; Dmitry Guzeev; Nikolay Suslov; Dave Riggs
- Starring: Cam Gigandet; Shane West; Rachael Leigh Cook; Bill Pullman; Mario Van Peebles; Troy Garity; JC Chasez; Jacob Vargas; Jason Gray-Stanford; Maria Guzeeva; Sergey Murzin; Vladimir Turchinsky
- Cinematography: Ron Hersey
- Edited by: Steve Mirkovich
- Music by: Timothy Williams
- Production companies: Svarog Films; Afterburner Films
- Distributed by: Aldamisa Releasing
- Release date: March 12, 2014
- Running time: 108 minutes
- Country: United States
- Language: English

Red Sky (previously known as Kerosene Cowboys) is a 2014 straight-to-DVD action/thriller film directed by Mario Van Peebles and starring Cam Gigandet, Shane West and Rachael Leigh Cook. Adam Prince and Van Peebles wrote the screenplay based on a story by Nikolay Suslov and Dave Riggs, who in turn based the story on characters from the novel Kerosene Cowboys: Manning the Spare by Randy Arrington. It is a Russian-American co-production (Svarog Films and Afterburner Films), supported by both Russian and American military forces. The film has been described as a "Top Gun-style pic" about pilots of an elite naval attack squadron.

== Plot ==
In 2001 in Iraq, two U.S. Navy pilots—Butch Masters and Tom Craig—are ordered to bomb an abandoned plant. The order appears to be false. American experts get killed in the plant. A secret chemical device, called "Rainmaker", designed for the biological destruction of oil, gets stolen. The military court cannot prove the pilots' intentions, and gives them a dishonorable discharge. After seven years Craig is rich and famous. He manages a private pilot team, working for Top Gun and for movies. Masters is a grease monkey in a small airport. He still tries to investigate his old case, and dreams of his own pilot's team. In order to get a license to fly Russian jets, Masters goes to St. Petersburg, where he meets old friends and new problems. At the same time, a Kurdish militant group plans to capture a part of Northern Iraq and found a new Kurdish state there. They plan to use Rainmaker to destroy oil fields there and make the territory uninteresting for Americans. The terrorists' base is located in Northern Iran, and cannot be reached by the US military. There is a deadly side of the Rainmaker technology - its byproduct is a toxic and radioactive aerosol which gathers in the atmosphere and can generate toxic rain which kills every living thing. Navy intelligence offers Masters to clear his name by performing a secret off-record mission to Iran with a team of retired pilots. Using unmarked planes, they have to bomb the base and destroy "Rainmaker". Doomed to death, betrayed by friends, and left in the Syrian desert, Masters and his team find unexpected support from the Russian Knights aerobatic team. Russians and Americans go to the final battle side by side.

== Cast ==
- Cam Gigandet as Butch Masters, a hot-shot pilot.
- Shane West as Tom Craig, Masters' one-time best friend-turned-nemesis.
- Rachael Leigh Cook as Karen Brooks, an investigative journalist and the love interest of Gigandet's character.
- Mario Van Peebles as Jason Cutter
- Bill Pullman as John Webster
- Troy Garity as Luke "Cajun" Babbineaux, a ragtag Navy fighter pilot.
- Jason Gray-Stanford as Arliss "Skids" Skidmore, a ragtag Navy fighter pilot.
- Jacob Vargas as Jorge "P-Dawg" Vasquez, a ragtag Navy fighter pilot.
- JC Chasez as Alex Cruz
- Kyle T. Heffner as Shadowy Government Operative

== Production ==
=== Music ===
The film's music was scored by Timothy Williams. The soundtrack was released digitally on August 5, 2014.
