= Canadian science fiction television =

Canadian science fiction television was produced by the CBC as early as the 1950s. In the 1970s, CTV produced The Starlost. In the 1980s, Canadian animation studios including Nelvana, began producing a growing proportion of the world market in animation.

In the 1990s, Canada became an important player in live action speculative fiction on television, with dozens of series like Forever Knight, Robocop, and most notably The X-Files and Stargate SG-1. Many series have been produced for youth and children's markets, including Deepwater Black and MythQuest.

In the first decade of the 21st century, changes in provincial tax legislation prompted many production companies to move from Toronto to Vancouver. Recent series produced in Vancouver include The Dead Zone, Smallville, Andromeda, Stargate Atlantis, Stargate Universe, The 4400, Sanctuary and the reimagined Battlestar Galactica.

Because of the small size of the domestic television market, most Canadian productions involve partnerships with production studios based in the United States and Europe. However, in recent years, new partnership arrangements are allowing Canadian investors a growing share of control of projects produced in Canada and elsewhere.

== History of science fiction television in Canada ==
Science fiction in Canada was produced by the CBC in its early years, notably the series Space Command (1953–1954). Actors such as James Doohan and William Shatner first appeared on Canadian television, before finding success in the United States. In the 1970s, CTV produced The Starlost in its Scarborough studios. In the 1980s, many animation houses, most notably Nelvana, began producing a growing proportion of the world market in animation; Canada has become the world leader in 3D animation with shows like ReBoot and Tripping the Rift. Only in the 1990s, with changes in exchange rates and tax legislation, plus a growing skills set among local production companies which had had success in local production and in producing films for American and international markets, that Canada became an important player in live action speculative fiction on television, with shows like Forever Knight, RoboCop, and most notably The X-Files and Stargate SG-1. The merger that produced Alliance Atlantis found itself with a large stable of science fiction shows, while Lions Gate Television, Fireworks Entertainment, CanWest Global, and CHUM Television produced shows of their own. American-based companies like Fox, Warner Bros., Paramount, and Universal also built substantial operations in Canada for their productions. During the 1990s and early 2000s, dozens of science fiction shows were produced in Canada, taking large market shares in American and international markets. A large body of shows have been produced for youth and children's markets, including Deepwater Black, 2030 CE, and MythQuest; many of these are mainly distributed outside North America.

== Actors and creative staff ==
Famous Canadian actors who played popular science fiction roles include Dan Aykroyd, John Candy, Jim Carrey, James Doohan, Nathan Fillion, Michael J. Fox, Lorne Greene, Michael Ironside, Leslie Nielsen, Walter Pidgeon, Christopher Plummer, Michael Shanks, William Shatner, Martin Short, Marc Singer, Donald Sutherland, Kiefer Sutherland, Amanda Tapping, Lexa Doig, Laura Bertram, Keanu Reeves, Kristin Kreuk and Carrie-Anne Moss.

Well-known Canadian filmmakers who have produced science fiction include James Cameron, David Cronenberg, Lex Gigeroff and Norman Jewison.

Canada's science fiction television industry is closely related to the United States. Many Canadian-born actors like Nicole de Boer, Amanda Tapping, Tricia Helfer, and Anthony Michael Hall are immediately recognizable to American SF fans, while some American-born actors and producers like Christopher Judge and Peter DeLuise have spent most of their working lives in Canada.

The Constellation Awards are awarded annually in Canada to honour the best science fiction or fantasy television or film works of the previous year.

After coming to Canada as a guest at Toronto Trek in 1994 and 1995, Majel Barrett Roddenberry chose Toronto as a base for producing Earth: Final Conflict, based on a concept created by her late husband, Gene Roddenberry; her son Rod became a Canadian resident for three years to work with the production team.

== Toronto to Vancouver ==
In the early 2000s, changes in provincial tax legislation prompted many production companies to move from Toronto to Vancouver, which already had a strong television production industry. Recent popular shows produced in Vancouver include The Dead Zone, The 4400, Andromeda, Stargate Atlantis, and the remake of Battlestar Galactica. Since 1995, more than half a billion dollars a year is spent on media production in Vancouver, with $1.4 billion in 2003 alone. Production also began growing in Alberta, Saskatchewan, and elsewhere, such as the production of Lexx in Halifax. However, Toronto continued to be a base for shows like Odyssey 5, Jake 2.0, and Mutant X.

== Foreign control and co-production ==
Because of the small size of the domestic television market, most Canadian productions involve partnerships with production studios based in the United States and Europe. This sometimes create long preparation cycles for many shows, with years of delay between initial creative development and actual production. Although American management was a common model for Canadian production in the 1990s, more complex partnership arrangements are allowing Canadian investors a growing share of control of projects produced in Canada. This trend has also resulted in outflowing investment to projects produced in other countries, including Doctor Who, a co-production between the CBC and BBC, and Charlie Jade, developed in Canada but produced in South Africa.
