= The Forger (2011 film) =

2011 film by Lawrence Roeck

- Directed by: Lawrence Roeck
- Written by: Carlos De Los Rios
- Produced by: Michael-Ryan Fletchall; Craig Comstock
- Starring: Josh Hutcherson; Hayden Panettiere; Lauren Bacall; Alfred Molina; Dina Eastwood; Billy Boyd
- Cinematography: Walt Lloyd
- Edited by: Michel Aller
- Music by: James Dooley
- Production company: Experience Media Studios
- Distributed by: Big Air Studios
- Release date: March 9, 2011 (premiere)
- Running time: 94 minutes
- Country: United States
- Language: English

The Forger (also known as Carmel-by-the-Sea) is a 2011 American drama film about art forgery. It stars Josh Hutcherson, Hayden Panettiere, Alfred Molina, Dina Eastwood and Lauren Bacall in her final film role. The film is produced by Michael-Ryan Fletchall and Craig Comstock, directed by Lawrence Roeck, and written by Carlos De Los Rios.

== Plot ==
Joshua Mason (Josh Hutcherson) is a troubled 15-year-old abandoned by his mother at a motel in Carmel-by-the-Sea, California. After selling a painting he completed at a local mission, Joshua flees when the motel manager demands payment. Social worker Vanessa Reese discovers the artistic drawings and paintings he has created throughout the motel room. Joshua befriends a girl named Amber (Hayden Panettiere), but after intervening when a school employee grabs her, he is confronted by her brother Ryan. Later, while hiding from the rain in a culvert, Joshua is swept into the ocean and injures his hand.

Joshua enters a seaside mansion through an unlocked side door, where he cleans his wound, eats, and discovers an unfinished painting in an art studio. He completes the portrait before falling asleep and is later found by police and taken to child services, telling social worker Vanessa Reese that he does not know where his mother is.

The mansion's owner, Everly (Alfred Molina), is impressed by Joshua's ability to accurately complete the painting and decides to take him in, hoping to make use of his artistic talent.

During a charity art event, Joshua meets Anne-Marie Cole (Lauren Bacall), a wealthy older woman, and reconciles with Amber's brother Ryan. Later that night, Joshua breaks into Anne-Marie's home, but after discovering him there, she contacts Everly to take him back.

The next day, Joshua kisses Amber on the beach without warning, upsetting her. Later, he finds Anne-Marie's dog, Matilda, and returns it to her home, where the two talk. Joshua later apologizes to Amber, and the two reconcile.

Meanwhile, Everly secretly sells Joshua's completed painting and recruits him to forge a Winslow Homer painting in order to save his failing galleries. At one of Amber's parties, Joshua becomes jealous after seeing her with another boy and fights with Ryan before going to Anne-Marie's home, where she treats his injuries.

Back at Everly's mansion, Joshua confronts him about the forgery scheme. Everly offers Joshua a share of the profits if he completes another forged painting, and Joshua agrees. Over the following week, Joshua learns techniques used to make forged paintings appear authentic. After completing the work, he begins to regret his involvement and hides the painting.

Meanwhile, Vanessa locates Joshua's mother living with her boyfriend and another child, leading her to contact child protective services. She also learns more about Joshua's abusive upbringing and Anne-Marie's past tragedy.

Joshua visits Anne-Marie after Everly claims that she was once involved in art forgery. Searching through her belongings, he finds evidence suggesting she had been connected to forged paintings and leaves feeling unable to trust anyone.

Vanessa later tells Joshua that she could not find his mother, leaving him devastated. Joshua eventually reconciles with Amber, while Anne-Marie discovers Everly's forgery operation and realizes Joshua has hidden the painting. At the art exhibition, Joshua returns the work, and Anne-Marie publicly exposes it as a forgery by cutting the canvas and confessing her own past involvement in Everly's schemes. The painting is proven fake when an underpainting of Dennis the Menace is revealed beneath the surface.

In the end, Joshua agrees to live with Anne-Marie and continues his relationship with Amber, finally finding a sense of belonging.

== Cast ==
- Josh Hutcherson as Joshua Mason
- Hayden Panettiere as Amber Felter
- Lauren Bacall as Anne-Marie Cole
- Alfred Molina as Everly Campbell
- Dina Eastwood as Vanessa Reese
- Billy Boyd as Bernie
- Adam Godley as Pinkus
- Alexandra Carl as Rachel
- Jansen Panettiere as Aram
- Scott Eastwood as Ryan
- Tricia Helfer as Sasha
- Alexander Poletti as Young Boy

== Production ==
The Forger marks Lawrence Roeck's debut as a feature film director. Experience Media Studios acquired the unfinished film in early 2010, and completed it by February 2011.

=== Filming ===
The film's 24-day shooting schedule finished on location in Carmel, California in February 2009, and included Carmel locals in several key scenes.

=== Music ===
"Livin," performed by Ribsy's Nickel; written by Jesse Corona & Jason Williams; published by Ribsy's Nickel Music BMI

== Release ==
The film world premiered as Carmel-by-the-Sea at the Arclight in Hollywood, California on March 9, 2011. Following a title change to The Forger, it was released on DVD on July 3, 2012 due to a decision to delay the release until after The Hunger Games (in which Josh Hutcherson plays a leading role) had premiered.
