= A Dog's Breakfast =

- DVD cover
- Directed by: David Hewlett
- Written by: story and screenplay by David Hewlett
- Produced by: John Lenic; Jane Loughman
- Starring: David Hewlett; Kate Hewlett; Paul McGillion; Rachel Luttrell; Amanda Byram; Michael Lenic; Christopher Judge; Mars the Dog
- Edited by: Jason Schneider
- Music by: Tim Williams
- Production company: Kibble Productions
- Distributed by: Kibble Productions; 20th Century Fox Home Entertainment (Home Media)
- Release dates: November 16, 2006 (screening); July 4, 2007 (Internet); September 18, 2007 (RC1 DVD)
- Running time: 88 minutes
- Countries: United States; Canada
- Language: English
- Budget: $120,000

A Dog's Breakfast is a 2006 Canadian comedy independent film. It was the first film to be written and directed by British-born Canadian actor David Hewlett, who is best known for his role of Dr. Rodney McKay in the TV franchise Stargate. Hewlett created the film as a private off-season project and stars alongside his real-life sister Kate Hewlett and Stargate actors Paul McGillion, Christopher Judge and Rachel Luttrell. The film was produced by John Lenic and Jane Loughman.

Due to its strong affiliation with the Stargate franchise, the film generated considerable buzz within the Stargate fandom. It had several screenings in selected major towns in the US and the UK in late 2006 and 2007. MGM picked up worldwide television and home video rights to the film in early December 2006. The film was released on DVD on September 18, 2007, in the United States and Canada by MGM's then-home-video distributor 20th Century Fox Home Entertainment.

== Plot ==
Patrick (David Hewlett) is single, loves his dog (Mars the Dog) and still lives in his parents' house ten years after their death. Shortly before Christmas, Patrick's sister Marilyn (Kate Hewlett) visits Patrick to introduce him to Ryan (Paul McGillion), a science fiction television star.

After accidentally knocking Ryan out with a cricket bat, Patrick is shocked to learn of Marilyn's engagement to Ryan. Patrick also overhears a dialogue excerpt that Ryan cites over the phone, which makes Patrick believe that Ryan wants to kill Marilyn. From this time on, Patrick tries everything in his power to protect his sister. But an apparently fatal accident happens: While Patrick is on the phone with Marilyn, Ryan tries to mount Christmas lights and falls off the ladder. Patrick panics and tries everything to hide Ryan's death from his sister, disposing of the body in the garden and in a nearby lake. But Ryan's dead body reappears each time. In an effort to interest Marilyn in other men, Patrick posts a fake online dating profile and arranges a blind date between Marilyn and a man named Chris (Christopher Judge). When Marilyn alerts the police that Ryan is missing, Ryan's aunt investigates Ryan's disappearance. After first suspecting Marilyn, Patrick's cover is blown.

Because it looks bad for Marilyn, the siblings decide to dismember Ryan's body and give it to Mars and the neighbors' dogs as food. Finally, when Patrick admits that Ryan has basically always been a friend to him, Marilyn reveals her plan: She and Ryan just faked his death, and the body that Patrick has been trying to get rid of has been Marilyn's sex doll all the time. Ryan has assumed the role of his aunt.

Some time later, when Patrick grows comfortable with the idea of accepting Ryan as his brother-in-law, Ryan's sister Elise (Amanda Byram) arrives but is not enthused with the upcoming wedding. Love at first sight between Patrick and Elise is apparent. While Marilyn shows her sister-in-law to-be the house, Ryan leads Patrick to the lake, with a moose figure behind his back.

== Cast ==
- David Hewlett as Patrick
- Kate Hewlett as Marilyn
- Paul McGillion as Ryan / Colt / Detective Morse
- Christopher Judge as Chris
- Rachel Luttrell as Ratcha
- Amanda Byram as Elise
- Michael Lenic as Zero
- Mars the Dog as Mars

== Production ==
=== Conception ===
Inspired by other actors pursuing a career in directing, David Hewlett wanted to spend his hiatus from Stargate Atlantis with other projects. He wrote three scripts of the horror and thriller genre before he got the idea for A Dog's Breakfast. He chose a more humorous subject because Stargate Atlantis generally involves peril despite its comedy elements. Hewlett considered the movie as a personal challenge and did not have wide-distribution plans initially.

The title of the film is derived from an English slang phrase meaning "a mess or muddle". In an online radio interview, David Hewlett joked that he chose this title so that the movie would have the right title if it didn't work out. He also said that the main character makes a mess out of everything, including murder, so the title was in fact carefully chosen.

Although David Hewlett had been rather focused on the actors and the acting before, he started paying more attention to old style comedy film-making such as works of Monty Python and director Blake Edwards. In general, old-fashioned comedies appealed more to him than comedy films of recent history. Hewlett said he copied some old-fashioned techniques into his own project. He specifically mentioned A Fish Called Wanda and Fawlty Towers as major influences.

Despite A Dog's Breakfast's murder theme, Hewlett wanted to avoid violence and gore as audience attraction, and rather produce a family film for all ages. He thinks that younger members of the audience will enjoy the cartoon-like elements of the movie.

Hewlett further mentioned Buster Keaton and Harold Lloyd of the silent era of movie-making as major influences, who he says reflect a simpler method of story-telling and comedy. Similarly, he did not want to overdo cutting and manipulation, as he feared this would endanger the comedy effect.

=== Filming ===
With the idea of making a movie, David Hewlett and Jane Loughman approached Stargate producer John Lenic, who arranged deals with motion picture companies. Paramount Production Services in Vancouver were confident enough in them to support them with free grip and electric equipment. Panavision Canada provided HD cameras for two weeks for a day's rate.

The majority of A Dog's Breakfast was filmed on a fourteen-day schedule and with extremely limited funds in January 2006 when Stargate Atlantis (the TV show David Hewlett stars in) was on hiatus between seasons, although some scenes had already been filmed on Saturdays during the Atlantis season. David Hewlett had originally planned to shoot at his own house in Washington, but legal problems due to its U.S. location forced the otherwise Canadian production to rent a house near Burnaby, British Columbia, Canada. Vancouver proved convenient as an alternative.

Many of the local actors and crew were eager to participate in the project, since the Vancouver winter weather creates a yearly lull in the local acting business. As such, A Dog's Breakfast featured many actors, crew members and pieces of equipment that are usually associated with the Stargate franchise. David Hewlett plays Rodney McKay in Stargate Atlantis, Kate Hewlett plays McKay's sister in several Atlantis episodes, Paul McGillion and Rachel Luttrell play Carson Beckett and Teyla Emmagan in Atlantis, respectively, and Christopher Judge is known as Teal'c from Stargate SG-1. Hewlett joked that McGillion joined the project because "he [had] nothing else to do," and that his sister, Kate Hewlett, "was really hard to get a hold of, because she's got a writing/acting career herself." Hewlett considered Christopher Judge for the role of the "Internet-dating loser" because "he seemed so incredibly inappropriate for the part that I thought it would be very funny to have him play it." Luttrell played "a space princess on the cheesy show."

A Dog's Breakfast producer John Lenic is a producer on Stargate SG-1 and Stargate Atlantis, and several other film crew members have significantly contributed to Stargate previously: Jim Menard (cinematography), James Robbins (production design), Mark & Robert Davidson (set decoration), Jan Newman (key makeup artist), Bill Mizel (first assistant director), Wray Douglas (special effects supervisor), James Bamford (stunt coordinator), Will Waring (camera operator), and Ivon Bartok (Behind the Scenes director). One set that is featured in the film as well as on Stargate is the Starcrossed spacecraft set, which stands in for several spaceships in the Stargate series, such as the Daedalus-class battlecruisers and the Prometheus. Music was composed by Timothy Williams.

Hewlett wrote the script especially around those availabilities. This made it possible to produce the film with a budget of $120,000 total to film and produce, mostly privately raised.

=== Marketing ===
Promotional poster.

The script was written with the Stargate audience in mind and pet lovers as a secondary audience. David Hewlett stated that he consciously wrote for certain audiences, as he had seen too many independent film makers fail who did not do so. Before contacting possible distributors, the producers of A Dog's Breakfast mapped out specific marketing strategies by visiting Stargate websites to learn about DVD sales, television viewers and convention attendance around the world.

Inspired by The Long Tail, Hewlett started an internet marketing campaign by setting up a YouTube channel and his own producer blog for $8 a month to keep promotion costs down. Hewlett discussed marketing strategies with eager fans online. He called this Squirrel Marketing.

Promoting the movie from a Stargate angle plus high YouTube sneak preview viewing numbers and a full theater for the test screening helped to convince Stargate's distributor MGM to make a deal with A Dog's Breakfast in November 2006. MGM in turn took advantage of Hewlett's grassroots support and wanted to make the movie into a test-run for direct-to-download releases. MGM officially announced the pick-up for worldwide television and home video rights on December 4, 2006.

== Releases ==
David Hewlett and his production team did not consider a theatrical release for A Dog's Breakfast until they noticed its potential to generate interest and to enable fans to see the film. They arranged a first sneak preview at the Creation Stargate Convention in Los Angeles on November 16, 2006. Two further screenings took place in London on February 1, 2007, with the second one only being arranged after the first planned screening had unexpectedly sold out online within twenty minutes. A Dog's Breakfast was screened several times at the Cinequest San Jose Film Festival in early March 2007, and two screenings took place in the city of Vancouver on March 25, 2007. In the screening at the 2007 Stratford-Upon-Avon Film Festival on May 24 and 26, the film was awarded Best Feature Film, and David Hewlett won the award for Best Actor. The Glastonbury Festival screened A Dog's Breakfast on June 22, 2007.

Although highly unusual for new movies, A Dog's Breakfast was offered in other digital formats months before the official DVD release, with iTunes and Amazon Unbox beginning their release on July 4, 2007. MGM senior executive vice president Charles Cohen considered this as a natural move due to the high amount of interest among the Stargate fan online community. A release on hulu.com followed later.

The film was released on RC1 DVD (North America) on September 18, 2007. MGM originally planned an international release for between April and June 2008, which they later pushed back to August 2008 to be published in tandem with Stargate: Continuum. However, as of May 2009, MGM held off an international release for up to December 2009. A UK release date remains unknown. The DVD contains special features, including a commentary track, deleted scenes, behind-the-scenes, and interviews with the cast and crew.

== Reception ==
GateWorld gave four out of four stars for the "mix of physical comedy and goofy sound effects, smart storytelling and a good deal of warmth". The reviewer labeled the movie a must-see for David Hewlett fans, and considered the acting "very real", with "delightful bonuses to Stargate fans". BostonNOW thought the movie was "well worth watching" and "quirky, funny and, that rarest of finds in comedy, original." They liked the comic timing of the actors, especially Hewlett. DVDSnapshot further found the low-budget indie project "a surprisingly good [film] while not relying on any big name stars or special effects." The Hewlett siblings were considered to have a "great onscreen brother-sister chemistry", and Paul McGillion's performance was lauded despite the few scenes he appears in. DVDSnapshot also stated that "the obvious jabs at Stargate are a lot of fun."

DVD Talk "highly recommended" the film as "unquestionably one of the best direct-to-video releases of the year," comparing the film to "Arsenic and Old Lace gone maniacally modern. [...] Breakfast reveals how great comedy is not dependent on cost – put together an intelligent script and a talented cast, and look how solid the results can be." The character work and beats, the direction and Hewlett's performance as "a master of wild overreaction and cartoonish screams" receive further positive mention. The Leader-Post found "what it may lack in polish it more than makes up for in wit and fun. The result is a quirky black comedy with plenty of Monty Python-esque humour and a hint of "The Tell-Tale Heart". [...] The movie's originality and simplicity is an asset as the spotlight is reserved fully for David Hewlett and his great acting abilities."

== Starcrossed and sequels ==
Starcrossed is a science fiction show originally within A Dog's Breakfast, created as a tribute to Stargate. During the movie production, several people told David Hewlett that Starcrossed should be made into a real show, so Hewlett approached NBC Universal and the Sci Fi Channel. David Hewlett wrote a draft for the Starcrossed pilot in late January 2007 and sent it to the network, who bought the pilot in return. A press release by the Sci Fi Channel described Starcrossed as a high touch, high-tech half-hour comedy about life behind the camera at a long-running sci-fi space soap, similar to the movie Galaxy Quest. David Hewlett further outlined Starcrossed as a "situation comedy about the making of a science fiction show, because there's really nothing sillier than serious science fiction. [...] It's very loosely based on a Stargate kind of thing, but it's not Stargate. It's not a spoof. It's just the silliness of the day-to-day life of trying to make a television series".

In March 2007, David Hewlett acknowledged that although Starcrossed made it into script stage, it might never be filmed. In July 2007, however, he stated that a Starcrossed deal was still much possible, leading to another potential hiatus project for him. Hewlett also mentioned the project in September 2007, stating that he was still in talks with Sci Fi "about spinning off [Starcrossed] into a Larry Sanders-type show about making science fiction." Other possibilities are producing webisodes. In March 2008, The Hollywood Reporter announced that Starcrossed was planned to debut in the fourth quarter of 2008 as an original web series, produced by Universal Media Studios, Jane Loughman and John Lenic. However, none of the plans were implemented. In April 2009, David Hewlett said via his Twitter account that Sci Fi would return the rights of Starcrossed to him and that he planned to shoot a two-hour pilot episode himself.

In his blogs and in an interview in 2008, David Hewlett hinted at a possible sequel, Heir of the Dog. He said that he would like to bring back Christopher Judge, Rachel Luttrell, and Paul McGillion in the sequel.
