= Beyond All Boundaries =

- Directed by: David Briggs
- Written by: Chris Ellis, Christopher Ellis
- Narrated by: Tom Hanks
- Music by: Tim Williams
- Release date: 9 November 2009
- Country: USA
- Language: English

Beyond All Boundaries is a 2009 short film depicting the battles of World War II. The film is shown in 4-D, and includes archive footage and special effects. The short, produced and narrated by Tom Hanks and directed by David Briggs, was released 9 November 2009 and is shown solely in The National World War II Museum, New Orleans. It was designed purely for the Solomon Victory Theater within the museum, and is only shown at this one location.

Solomon Victory Theater makes use of vibrating seats and atmospheric effects to enhance the viewing experience. In addition, there are also moving props and scenery, lighting and sound effects and a multi-layered projection process.

The film makes use of the writings and documented accounts of World War II veterans.

In 2011, Beyond All Boundaries received a Thea Award for Outstanding Achievement from the Themed Entertainment Association.

== Cast ==
Actor	Character
Kevin Bacon	Robert Sherrod
Corbin Bleu	Eddie W. Robinson / Sgt. Dan Levin
Patricia Clarkson	Marguerite Higgins
Kevin Connolly	Donald Sanborn / Pvt. Raymond Howell
James Cromwell	Major General Alexander A. Vandegrift / Fleet Admiral William Halsey
Blythe Danner	Elsa Maxwell
Viola Davis	Hortense Johnson
Jesse Eisenberg	Lt. Fiske Hanley / Sgt. Benjamin McKinney
John Goodman	Capt. Edwin Simmons
Tom Hanks	Narrator
Neil Patrick Harris	1st Lt. David Hettema / Sgt. William Manchester
Kevin Jonas	Mike Mervosh
Tom Kane	Edward R. Murrow
Justin Long	Cpl. James R. Garrett / Sgt. John H. Morris
Tobey Maguire	Pvt. George Strang
Joseph Mazzello	Eugene B. Sledge
Daran Norris	1940s Newscaster
Wendell Pierce	Sgt. Thomas McPhatter
Chris Pine	Hanson Baldwin / Sgt. Bill Reed
Brad Pitt	Sgt. Bill Mauldin
William Sadler	Lt. Colonel Lewis B. 'Chesty' Puller
Gary Sinise	Ernie Pyle
Elijah Wood	Cpl. Wilfred Hanson / Capt. John C. Chapin
