= Christopher Judge =

American actor (born 1964)

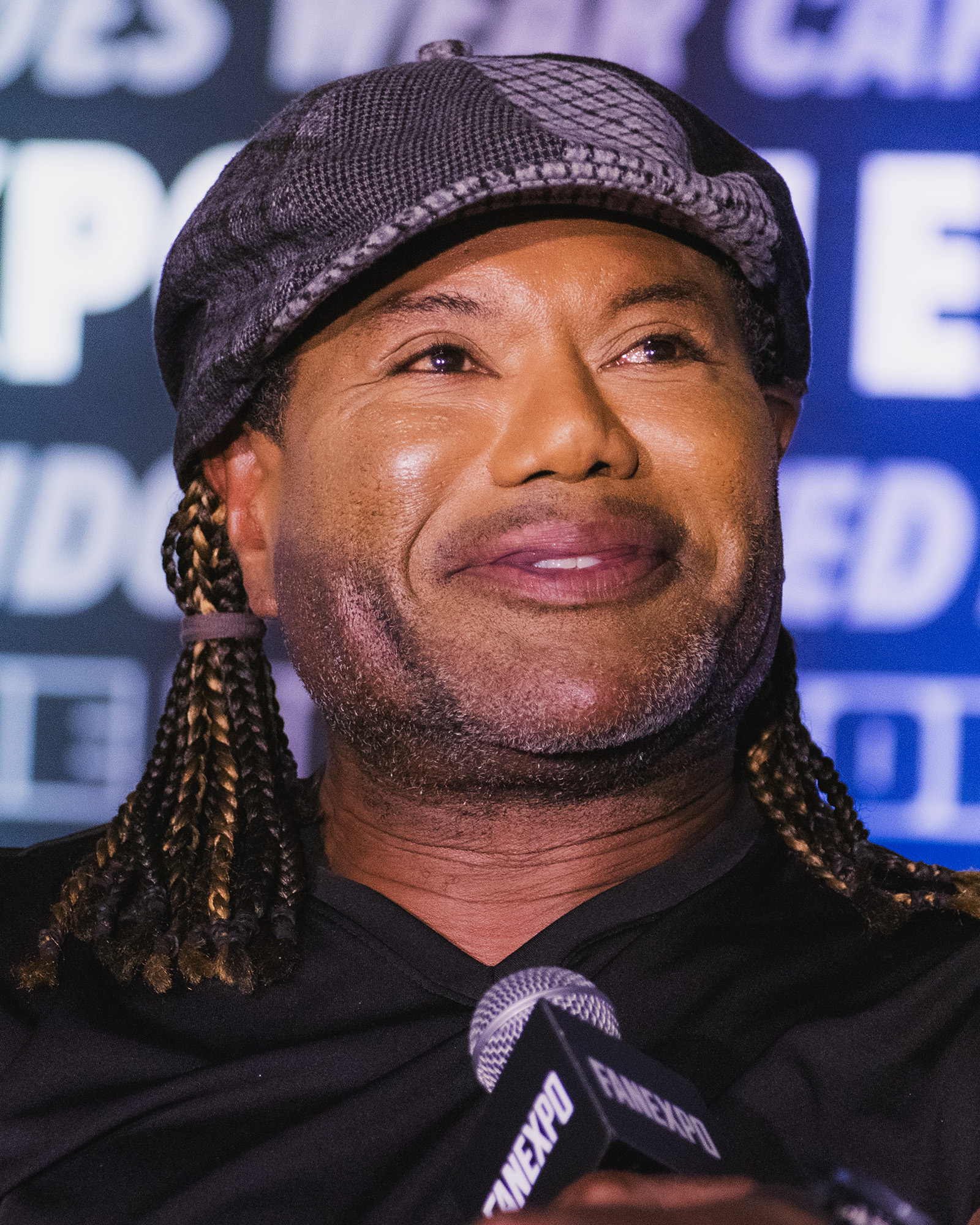
- Judge in 2026
- Born: Douglas Christopher Judge; October 13, 1964 (age 62); Los Angeles, California, U.S.
- Occupations: Actor, voice actor
- Years active: 1990–present
- Height: 6 ft 3 in (191 cm)
- Spouse: Gianna Patton (m. 2011)
- Children: 3, including Cameron

Christopher Judge (born October 13, 1964) is an American actor. He is best known for playing Teal'c in the Canadian-American military science fiction television series Stargate SG-1 (1997–2007). He is also the second actor to portray Kratos in the God of War video game series, playing the role in God of War (2018) and its sequel God of War Ragnarök (2022). He also provided the voice of Magneto in X-Men: Evolution. He attended the University of Oregon on a football scholarship and was a Pacific-10 Conference player.

== Early life ==
Judge wanted to be an actor from an early age, and studied drama in high school. "The television set was my babysitter growing up. I can remember wanting to invoke the feelings that I was getting from television—I wanted to be the one who was the catalyst for those feelings in other people. Performing was something I've always known I was going to do." He always knew that sports would be a stepping stone to an acting career.

Judge received a scholarship from the University of Oregon and played defensive back and safety for the Ducks from 1982 to 1985. He led in kickoff return yardage for 1983–84 and interceptions in 1984 and won the Casanova Award in 1982, awarded to the freshman or newcomer of the year. While at Oregon, Judge was a Pacific-10 Conference Selection in 1984 and played in the 1985 Hula Bowl.

Judge won a contest to host a radio show in Oregon, and in his senior year he won a regional contest to host the West Coast FOX KLSR Morning Show, an "MTV talk show type thing"; he used this experience to get an agent and move back to Los Angeles.

== Career ==
=== Acting ===
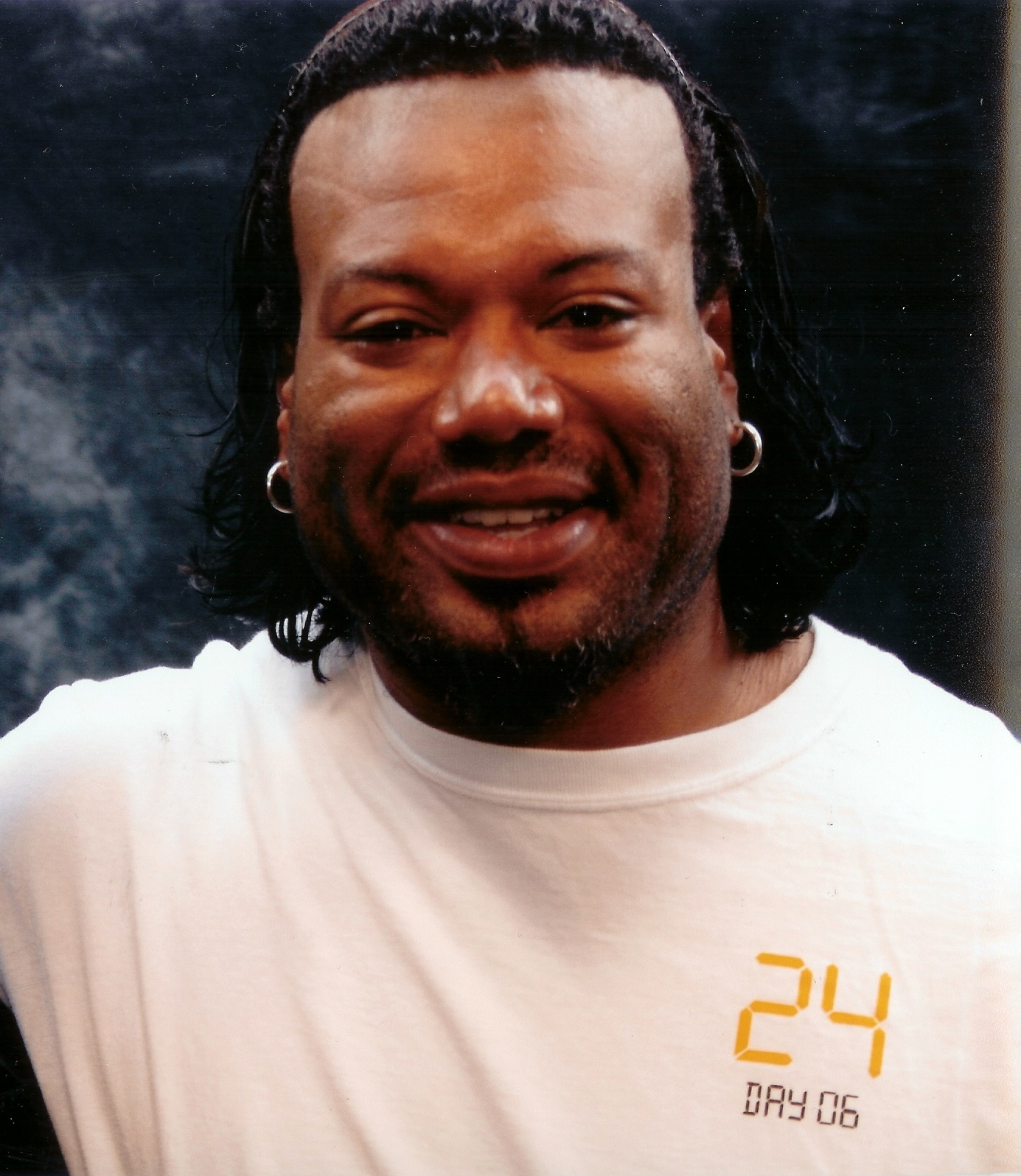
Judge at the 2008 Armageddon Convention in Christchurch, New Zealand

In 1989, Judge began studying at the Howard Fine Studio in Los Angeles. His early roles in the 1990s included Bird on a Wire, Cadence, Neon Rider and MacGyver with future Stargate SG-1 star Richard Dean Anderson. In the ensuing years, Judge had small parts in various television shows and films such as 21 Jump Street (with future SG-1 director Peter DeLuise), The Fresh Prince of Bel-Air, and House Party 2, and as a regular on Sirens from 1994 to 1995.

Judge's largest role came in 1997 with Stargate SG-1. While at a friend's house, he saw his friend's roommate practicing for an audition for the show and was intrigued. While the roommate was away, Judge looked at the audition notes, called his agent, and insisted he get him an audition or lose him as a client. At the audition, there were three actors trying out for each of the other principal roles, but eight or ten for the role of Teal'c. Judge was confident that he had acquired the part when they dismissed everyone who had read for the part except him.

Judge's subsequent work includes guest spots on Andromeda, Stargate Atlantis, The Mentalist, the television film Personal Effects, and the films Snow Dogs and A Dog's Breakfast, the latter written and directed by fellow Stargate actor David Hewlett. Judge appeared in "Anonymous", the October 26, 2010, episode of NCIS: Los Angeles, and as one of Bane's henchmen in the 2012 film The Dark Knight Rises.

=== Writing ===
Judge wrote four Stargate SG-1 episodes: season five's "The Warrior", season six's "The Changeling", season seven's "Birthright", and season eight's "Sacrifices".

After Stargate SG-1 was cancelled, Judge began writing a script for a show called Rage of Angels that would have enabled him to play "the lead in an hour formatted show and prove that a black lead can be commercially viable and sustainable in overseas markets." The script was marketed as a two-hour, backdoor pilot with MGM, but is now apparently with Direct TV and Starz Media.

=== Voice work ===
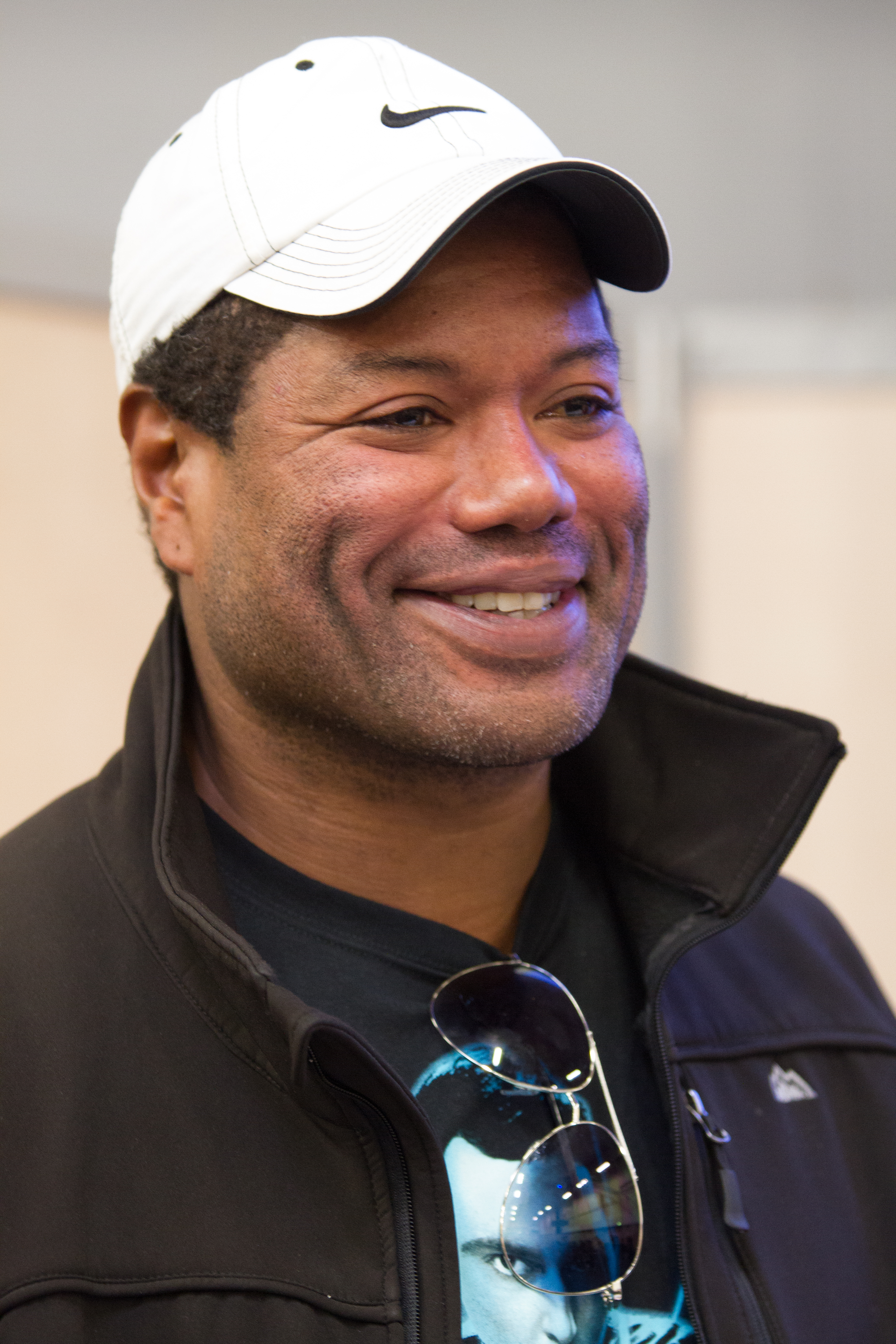
Judge in 2012

Judge has also done voice acting for animated series and video games, including Magneto on X-Men: Evolution, and the canceled Stargate SG-1: The Alliance.

In the season eight episode, "Avatar", Teal'c informs SG-1 that he plays Def Jam Vendetta, alluding to the fact that Judge had provided the voice of D-Mob, the main antagonist in that game. He once again appeared as D-Mob in the sequel, Def Jam: Fight for NY. He voiced Jericho in Turok.

Judge provided the voice of Zodak on the 2002 He-Man and the Masters of the Universe cartoon as well as Coach Grey in the Action Man CGI series from 2000.

On June 14, 2016, Judge confirmed he was the voice actor for Kratos in the 2018 God of War, replacing longtime voice actor Terrence C. Carson. He reprised the role in God of War Ragnarök.

== Personal life ==
Judge married his wife, Gianna Patton, in 2011 after ten years of dating. Judge is involved with the Boys & Girls Clubs of Canada and is an avid golfer.

His first son, Cameron, is a professional Canadian football linebacker for the Toronto Argonauts; Cameron played college football for UCLA and was drafted 2nd overall in the 2017 CFL draft. His younger son, Christopher Jordan, played college football for Cal Poly and was drafted 71st overall in the 2019 CFL draft.

According to tweets from Judge, he could not walk in 2019, and he had to undergo surgery to have both his hips replaced, alongside back and knee surgery.

== Awards and nominations ==
In 2002, Judge was nominated for a Saturn Award in the category of Best Supporting Actor in a Television Series for his work on Stargate SG-1.

On February 13, 2019, at the 22nd Annual D.I.C.E. Awards, Judge accepted the award for Outstanding Achievement in Character for his performance as Kratos in God of War. During 2023's 26th Annual D.I.C.E. Awards, Judge again accepted the award for Outstanding Achievement in Character for the same role in God of War Ragnarök.

In 2019, Judge was nominated for the British Academy Games Award for Performer at the 15th British Academy Games Awards, but he lost to his co-star Jeremy Davies. He was subsequently nominated for and won the Performer in a Leading Role at the 19th British Academy Games Awards in 2023.

In 2022, Judge won the award for Best Performance at the Game Awards 2022 for his role in God of War Ragnarök as Kratos.

== Filmography ==
=== Film ===
Year	Title	Role	Notes
1990	Bird on a Wire	Cop at Cafe	Credited as Doug Judge
1990	Cadence	Psych. Ward M.P. #1	Credited as Douglas Judge
1991	House Party 2	Miles	Credited as D. Christopher Judge
1997	Stargate: Children of the Gods	Teal'c	Direct-to-video
2001	Out of Line	Alfonso James	
2002	Snow Dogs	Dr. Brooks	
2002	Romantic Comedy 101	Nigel	Television film
2005	Personal Effects	Nate Wall	Television film
2007	A Dog's Breakfast	Chris	
2008	Stargate: The Ark of Truth	Teal'c	Direct-to-video
2008	Stargate: Continuum	Teal'c	Direct-to-video
2008	Max Steel: Bio Crisis	Jefferson (voice)	Direct-to-video
2010	Paradox	Captain Papillo	
2011	Dead Space: Aftermath	Nickolas Kuttner	Voice; direct-to-video
2011	Rehab	Charles	
2012	The Dark Knight Rises	Mercenary Assassin	
2012	Clash of the Empires	Amthar	Direct-to-video
2013	Smokin'	Jim	Short
2014	Mega Shark vs. Mecha Shark	Jack Turner	
2014	A Tiger's Tail	Joe Camp	
2014	Knock 'em Dead	Freddy	
2014	To Have and to Hold	Sampson	
2014	Wraith	Wraith	Voice; short
2014	The Underground Railroad	Bear	
2014	Reaper	Officer Banks	
2014	LA Apocalypse (Doomed Planet)	Lt. Grisham	
2014	Lowlifes	Commander Randall	
2014	Nobility	Admiral Nev	
2015	Sharknado 3: Oh Hell No!	Secret Service Agent	
2015	Lord of the Elves	Anthar Master of the Hunt	
2018	Minutes to Midnight	Ranger Taso	

=== Television ===
Year	Title	Role	Notes
1990	Neon Rider		
1990	MacGyver	Deron	Episode: "Live and Learn", credited as Doug Judge
1990	21 Jump Street	Man in Queue	Episode: "Unfinished Business", uncredited
1990	Booker	Jones/Mover	2 episodes
1994–1995	Sirens	Off. Richard Stiles	Recurring role, season 2 (22 episodes); credited as D. Christopher Judge
1995	The Fresh Prince of Bel-Air	Workman	Episode: "There's the Rub: Part 2", credited as D. Christopher Judge
1997–2007	Stargate SG-1	Teal'c	Main role (211 episodes)
2000	Adventures from the Book of Virtues	Plato	Voice; main role (season 3)
2001	First Wave	Xevallah	Episode: "Beneath the Black Sky"
2001	Freedom	Doctor Roeg	Episode: "Mind Game"
2000–2001	Action Man	Coach Simon Grey	Voice; recurring role (14 episodes)
2002	Just Cause	Reverend Lester Stokes	Episode: "The Wives of Christmas Past"
2002–2003	Andromeda	Hector-Resolution of Hector/Achilles Avatar	3 episodes
2000–2003	X-Men: Evolution	Magneto	Voice; recurring role (20 episodes)
2003–2004	He-Man and the Masters of the Universe	Zodak, Zeelahr	Voice, 4 episodes; credited as Chris Judge
2007–2008	Stargate: Atlantis	Teal'c	2 episodes
2010	NCIS: Los Angeles	Assan Refiq	Episode: "Anonymous"
2012	The Mentalist	Dante Holmes	Episode: "Pink Champagne on Ice" Season 4 Episode 19
2015	Chainsaw Sally: The Animated Series	The Baron	Voice
2017	Wacky Races	Brick Crashman, additional voices	Voice; main role
2019–2021	Final Space	Oreskis	Voice, 2 episodes
2022	The Guardians of Justice	President Nicholas E. Nukem	

=== Video games ===
Year	Title	Role	Notes
2003	Def Jam Vendetta	D-Mob	
2004	Def Jam Fight for NY	D-Mob	Credited as Chris Judge
2004	World of Warcraft	Additional voices	
2008	Turok	Jericho	Credited as Chris Judge
2013	Stargate SG-1: Unleashed	Teal'c	Voice and likeness
2014	World of Warcraft: Warlords of Draenor	Additional voices	
2015	StarCraft II: Legacy of the Void	Additional voices	
2018	God of War	Kratos	Voice and motion capture
2018	World of Warcraft: Battle for Azeroth	Akunda, Gorak Tul, Sunwalker Ordel	
2021	Marvel's Avengers	T'Challa / Black Panther	War for Wakanda DLC expansion
2022	God of War Ragnarök	Kratos	Voice and motion capture
2023	God of War Ragnarök: Valhalla	Kratos	Voice and motion capture; DLC expansion

=== Writing ===
Year	Title	Episode	Notes
2002	Stargate SG-1	"The Warrior"	Season 5, episode 18. Aired in January.
2003	Stargate SG-1	"The Changeling"	Season 6, episode 19. Aired in February.
2003	Stargate SG-1	"Birthright"	Season 7, episode 10. Aired in August.
2004	Stargate SG-1	"Sacrifices"	Season 8, episode 09. Aired in September.
