= Experience Media Studios =

- Industry: Entertainment
- Founded: 2009
- Headquarters: Abu Dhabi, United Arab Emirates
- Area served: Worldwide
- Key people: Michael-Ryan Fletchall (CEO) Jason Kay (VP of Production, North America)
- Products: Motion pictures, television programming, new media, video-on-demand, home video, digital distribution
- Website: ExperienceMediaStudios.com

Experience Media Studios is a movie and television studio headquartered in Abu Dhabi, United Arab Emirates. It is the first movie and television studio organized in the UAE.

== Background ==
The company is a media studio with multiple projects across current and emerging media distribution outlets and platforms.

=== Current developments ===
Under current development are The Global Citizen Awards, a live, globally broadcast event that recognizes and awards major contributions to the advancement of mankind, Zayed, a biographical movie about his highness Sheikh Zayed bin Sultan Al Nahyan, the late ruler of Abu Dhabi and founding father of the United Arab Emirates. and Abdulla Omar and the Lost Sand City, a fictional adventure movie featuring the first Emirati action hero.

In early 2010, the company expanded its operations in the North American marketplace, opening offices in Las Vegas, Nevada, and appointing Jason Kay as Vice President of Production for North America. The studio acquired Carmel and completed it by February 2011. The DVD version of Carmel released on July 3, 2012 following a title change.

In February 2013, Experience Media Studios optioned 'Possessed Soul' from Jason Whittier, planning to adapt it for a new entertainment media technology the studio has been developing.
