= David Hewlett =

British and Canadian actor (born 1968)

- Hewlett in 2026
- Born: David Ian Hewlett; 18 April 1968 (age 58); Redhill, Surrey, England
- Citizenship: United Kingdom; Canada
- Occupations: Actor; director; writer
- Years active: 1984–present
- Spouses: Soo Garay (m. 2000; div. 2004); Jane Loughman (m. 2008)
- Children: 1
- Relatives: Kate Hewlett (sister)

David Ian Hewlett (born 18 April 1968) is a British–Canadian actor, writer and director, known for his role as Dr. Rodney McKay in the Stargate science-fiction franchise. He first gained fame for his roles as Grant Jansky in the Canadian TV series Traders (1996–2000) and as David Worth in the Canadian psychological horror film Cube (1997). He appeared in the horror film Pin (1988) and the science-fiction films Scanners II: The New Order (1991) and Rise of the Planet of the Apes (2011).

== Early life ==
Hewlett was born in Redhill, England, and moved with his family to Canada at the age of four. He received his first computer in his mid-teens and became a self-described "computer nerd". While attending high school in Toronto, he launched his acting career, starring in student films by Vincenzo Natali. He dropped out of high school in his senior year to pursue careers in acting and computing, at the beginning of his acting career in 1984 at the age of sixteen.

Before his acting career took off, Hewlett ran Darkyl Media, a website design firm, and also founded Fusefilm.com, a now-defunct internet community for filmmakers.

== Career ==
Hewlett has appeared in many low-budget horror films, such as The Darkside and the minor cult favourites Scanners II: The New Order and Pin. He also guest starred in several television series. In 1996, he landed one of his better-known roles, as Grant Jansky on Traders. In 1997, Hewlett worked with Natali again, starring in the critically acclaimed thriller Cube as Worth.

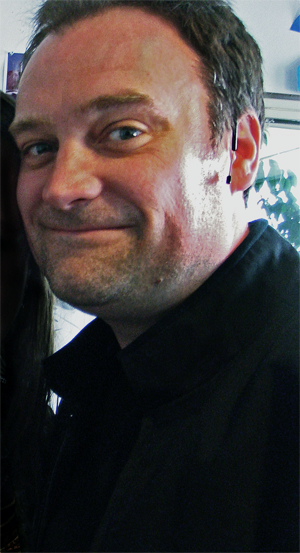
Hewlett in the conference room at Bridge Studios, 2008

Hewlett, an avid science fiction fan, has been quoted saying that Doctor Who, a sci-fi program made in his native Britain, is what first sparked his love for the genre, and that he made science fiction with his friends when he was younger in Britain, on his 8 mm camera. Hewlett had his early dreams of working in science fiction made into a reality when he first had a four-episode guest role on the Canadian/American sci-fi series Stargate SG-1 as the Stargate expert Rodney McKay, which eventually grew into his starring role on Stargate Atlantis.

In 2007, Hewlett appeared as a guest star in the first episode of the TV series Sanctuary, a show produced by and starring Stargate actress Amanda Tapping. He played Larry Tolson, a patient suffering from a form of psychosis who is shot and wounded before being taken into police custody as a murder suspect.

In 2006, he wrote and directed A Dog's Breakfast starring himself, his sister Kate Hewlett, his dog Mars, and his Stargate Atlantis costars Paul McGillion, Christopher Judge and Rachel Luttrell. On 23 July 2006, Hewlett created a YouTube channel named Fanatical.

In 2014, Hewlett directed the supernatural horror-science fiction film Debug with Jason Momoa, who had starred alongside Hewlett in Stargate Atlantis. Jeananne Goossen and Adrian Holmes played the lead roles in the film.

In 2015, Hewlett appeared in the Syfy TV series Dark Matter, which is based on the comic book of the same name. He played a recurring role as Tabor Calchek, a merchant who also serves as the team's handler. Hewlett continues his interest in filmmaking.

In 2017, he made "HEWLOGRAM," a sci-fi comedy short showcasing the filmmaking and special effects tools of Red Giant.

== Personal life ==
Hewlett married actress Soo Garay in 2000; they divorced in 2004. He married Jane Loughman in 2008. They have a son born in 2007. Hewlett's younger sister is actress Kate Hewlett. She has appeared on Stargate Atlantis as Rodney McKay's sister, Jeannie Miller, multiple times in the series. When not filming, Hewlett volunteers as a parent sponsor of a school PC/Tech club for kids interested in 3D printing, programming and repurposing tech equipment.

== Filmography ==
=== Film ===
Year	Title	Role	Notes
1987	The Darkside	Chuckie	
1988	Pin	Leon	
1989	The Penthouse	Joe Dobson	TV film
1989	Dead Meat		
1990	Where the Heart Is	Jimmy	
1990	Deep Sleep	Terry	
1990	Desire and Hell at Sunset Motel	Deadpan Winchester	
1991	Scanners II: The New Order	David Kellum	
1991	The First Circle	'Ruska' Rostislav	TV film
1992	A Savage Christmas: The Fall of Hong Kong	Walter Jenkins	
1992	Quiet Killer	Myles Chapman	
1992	Split Images	Gary Hammond	TV film
1993	Blood Brothers	Detective Trayne	
1993	The Boys of St. Vincent: 15 Years Later	Steven Lunney, age 25	
1996	Joe's Wedding	Rob Fitzgerald	
1997	Cube	David Worth, the Architect	
1997	On the 2nd Day of Christmas	Mel	TV film
1997	Elevated	Hank	Short
1997	Bad Day on the Block	Andrew	
1998	Clutch	Martyn	
1998	Milkman	Martin/Soldier's	Voice
1999	Survivor	Le médecin	TV film
1999	The Life Before This	Nick	
1999	Blind	The Victim	Short
1999	Autoerotica	Gord	Short
1999	Amateur Night	D.J.	Short
2001	Chasing Cain	Bud	
2001	And Never Let Her Go	Gerry Capano	TV film
2001	The Triangle	Gus Gruber	TV film
2001	Century Hotel	Michael	
2001	Treed Murray	Murray	aka Get Down
2002	Made In Canada, Volume 1: Best of the CFC	Himself	
2002	Cypher	Virgil Dunn	
2002	Father Lefty	Father Gregory	TV film
2003	Nothing	Dave	Story writer
2003	Foolproof	Lawrence Yeager	
2003	Friday Night	Roger	Short
2004	Boa vs. Python	Dr. Steven Emmett	
2004	Ice Men	Bryan	
2004	Darklight	Anders Raeborne	TV film
2006	A Dog's Breakfast	Patrick	Director and story writer
2008	Helen	Frank	
2009	Splice	William Barlow	
2010	The Whistleblower	Fred Murray	
2011	Rise of the Planet of the Apes	Hunsiker	
2011	Morlocks	Dr. Radnor	TV film
2011	Rage of the Yeti	Mills	Director
2013	Haunter	Olivia's Father	
2014	Debug	—	Director
2017	The Shape of Water	Fleming	
2019	Midway	Husband E. Kimmel	
2019	Lie Exposed	Brian	
2021	Nightmare Alley	Dr. Elrood	
2022	The Swearing Jar	Bill	
2024	A Thousand Cuts		
2024	Levels	Oliver	

=== Television ===
Year	Title	Role	Notes
1984	The Edison Twins	Howard	Episode: "The Delinquent"
1988	Friday the 13th: The Series	Cal	Episode: "Tales of the Undead"
1988	My Secret Identity	Rock	Episode: "A Walk on the Wild Side"
1987	Night Heat	Gil	Episode: "Simon Says"
1988–1989	T. and T.	Detective Jones/Ronnie	Episodes: "Black and White" & "Thicker Than White"
1990	The Campbells	Captain Henderson / Ned Kane	Episodes: "And in the Spring" & "Live by the Sword"
1988–1994	Street Legal	Dave Lister / Tim Woolrich	Episodes: "Murder by Video" & "Persons Living or Dead"
1991–1992	Katts and Dog	The Strangler	3 episodes
1992	Forever Knight	Matthew Reed	Episode: "Dead Air"
1992–1993	Beyond Reality	Tom	2 episodes
1993	Shining Time Station	Ted Typo	2 episodes
1993	Tropical Heat (AKA Sweating Bullets)	Gleason	Episode: "Object of Desire"
1993–1996	Kung Fu: The Legend Continues	Dr. Nicholas Elder	13 episodes
1994	Monster Force	Lance McGruder (voice)	13 episodes
1996–2000	Traders	Grant Jansky	73 episodes
1999	Twice in a Lifetime	Mr. Green	Episode: "O'er the Ramparts We Watched"
2001	ER	Mr. Schudy	Episode: "Never Say Never"
2001–2007	Stargate SG-1	Dr. Rodney McKay	7 episodes
2003	Mutant X	Hector Friemark	Episode: "The Taking of Crows"
2004	Without a Trace	Fred Watkins	Episode: "Hawks and Handsaws"
2004	The District	Frederick	Episode: "Family Values"
2004–2009	Stargate: Atlantis	Dr. Rodney McKay	100 episodes
2009	The Closer	FBI Special Agent Jerry Moore	Episode: "Walking Back the Cat"
2010–2011	Hellcats	Dr. Thurston Eagan	2 episodes
2011	Stargate: Universe	Dr. Rodney McKay	Episode: "Seizure"
2013	Darknet	Lewis	Episode: "Darknet 1"
2013	State of Syn	Aslin Kane	6 episodes
2015–2016	Dark Matter	Talbor Calchek	4 episodes
2016	Suits	Nathan Burnes	Episode: "Back on the Map"
2016	Incorporated	Chad Peterson	4 episodes
2016–2017	Murdoch Mysteries	Dilbert Dilton	2 episodes
2019	Hudson & Rex	Nelson Dwyer	Episode: "Man of Consequence"
2021	Clarice	Anthony Herman	5 episodes
2021	Departure	Bill Ratch	Recurring role (season 2)
2021	Private Eyes	Earl Baer	Episode: "Drop Dead Carny"
2021–2022	See	Tormada	Guest role (season 2), main role (season 3)
2022	Guillermo del Toro's Cabinet of Curiosities	Masson	Episode: "Graveyard Rats"
2025	Mistletoe Murders	Ray	
2025	Saint-Pierre (TV series)	Gerard Bennett	Episode: "Island Getaway"
