= Perfect Pie =

2000 play by Judith Thompson

Perfect Pie is a play written by Judith Thompson, and first staged at Toronto's Tarragon Theatre in 2000, with Judith Thompson also directing.

The assistant director for the original production was Caroline Azar. The original cast starred Nancy Palk (Patsy), Tara Rosling (Young Patsy), Sonja Smits (Francesca), and Liisa Repo-Martell (Marie - Francesca's original name). Music for the production was composed and performed by Bill Thompson.

The story concerns the childhoods of Patsy and Marie and the impact it had on their later lives. Much of the dialogue is centered on their prom night when Marie was abused by more than one boy. The play deals with a number of complex themes, such as child abuse and rape.

The play was originally written as a monologue in 1993. It was published in book form by Playwrights Canada Press on September 1, 2000.

== Film adaptation ==
In 2002, it was adapted by Judith Thompson into the film Perfect Pie, directed by Barbara Willis Sweete and starring Wendy Crewson, Barbara Williams, Rachel McAdams, Alison Pill, and Tom McCamus.

== Publishing history ==
- Judith Thompson, Perfect Pie, Playwrights Canada Press, 1 September 2000, ISBN 978-0-88754-590-0
