= Jeananne Goossen =

Canadian-American actress (born 2006)

- Born: January 3, 1985 (age 41); Toronto, Ontario, Canada
- Occupation: Actor
- Years active: 2006–present

Jeananne "Jae" Goossen is a Chinese-Canadian-American actor who has had roles in films The Love Hypothesis and The Vow and television series Alcatraz and Nashville, where she recorded two songs.

== Early life ==
Goossen was born on January 3, 1985, in Toronto, Ontario, Canada. Goossen was raised in a middle-class family, with a Chinese mother and a Canadian father. Goossen studied biochemistry at McGill University in Montreal, originally with the aim of becoming a gynecologist. During her studies, she decided to pursue an acting career.

== Career ==
Her first television appearances were in 2006 in the Canadian television series 11 Cameras, Falcon Beach (2007) and Wild Roses (2009). For her supporting role in Falcon Beach, she was nominated for a Gemini Award in 2007. They also appeared in other Canadian productions, including the TIFF premiered film comedy Breakfast with Scot (2007) and in the television series Falcon Beach (2007). In the 2010 miniseries Riverworld, based on a novel series of science fiction author Philip José Farmer, she played the role of the samurai warrior Tomoe Gozen.

In 2011, Goossen was in the eighth season of the crime series CSI: NY in the role of Officer Lauren Cooper. In the ninth season of the crime series NCIS, she played a recurring role as private Joan Matteson, a former acquaintance of the main character Leroy Jethro Gibbs. In 2012 she appeared in the first and only season of the sci-fi mystery series Alcatraz as Medical Examiner Nikki.

In February 2012, it was announced that Goossen would appear in the television series The Following opposite Kevin Bacon and James Purefoy in the major role FBI agent Jennifer Mason. However, she was released from the project in May 2012. In 2014 and 2015, she appeared in NBC's medical drama The Night Shift as Dr. Krista Bell-Hart.

In 2014, Goossen appeared alongside Jason Momoa in the Canadian science-fiction movie, Debug.

In 2016, she played the role of 'Chelle, a Savior in the 13th episode of the 6th season of The Walking Dead and joined the cast of Nashville in a recurring role and performed several songs throughout her arc.

In 2018, she played the role of a starship officer in Hyperlight, a science fiction short film presented by DUST on YouTube. In 2021, she portrayed Dr. Persephonie Trinh in the fourth season of the Canadian horror anthology series Slasher, who had skeletons in her closet like the rest of the characters and was later revealed to be one of the major antagonists after a brief disappearance in the show.

In 2020, they went toe to toe with Ann Dowd's Aunt Lydia in the award winning Handmaid's Tale in the role of Aunt Ruth.

In 2026 they played alongside Lili Reinhart and Tom Bateman as Dr Aslan in the highly anticipated RomCom The Love Hypothesis.

== Filmography ==
=== Film ===
Year	Title	Role	Notes
2007	Breakfast with Scot	Nula	
2009	138 Arlington	Anne Hale	Short film
2009	Glitch	Tamara	Short film
2010	Daylight Savings	Angel	Short film
2011	Unlucky	Agent Wong	
2012	The Vow	Sonia	
2014	This Last Lonely Place	Luna	
2014	Debug	Kaida	
2018	Hyperlight	Emiliana Newton	Short film
2023	Mom's Christmas Boyfriend	Emma	
2026	The Love Hypothesis	Dr. Juliet Aslan	

=== Television ===
Year	Title	Role	Notes
2006	11 Cameras	Serenity	Recurring role
2006	Angela's Eyes	Julie Molson	Episode: "Pilot"
2006	Rent-a-Goalie	Lise Lambeau	Episode: "Shit Zone"
2007	Falcon Beach	Courtney True	Recurring role
2009	Wild Roses	Ricky	Recurring role
2009	Aaron Stone	Arkov	Episodes: "Not So Friendly Skies: Parts 1 & 2"
2009	The Dealership	Trisha Harms	TV film
2009	The B Team	Jojo Lum	TV film
2010	Republic of Doyle	Grace Ebner	Episode: "The Pen Is Mightier Than the Doyle"
2010	Riverworld	Tomoe Gozen	TV film
2010	Unnatural History	Agent Fitzgerald	Episode: "Now You See Me"
2011	Suits	Theresa	Episode: "Tricks of the Trade"
2011	CSI: NY	Off. Lauren Cooper	Episodes: "Cavallino Rampante", "Officer Involved"
2011–2012	NCIS	Marine Pvt. Joan Matteson	Episodes: "Engaged: Parts 1 & 2", "Life Before His Eyes"
2012	Alcatraz	Nikki	Recurring role
2013	Emily Owens, M.D.	Molly	Episodes: "The Car and the Cards", "The Social Experiment", "The Teapot"
2013	The Following	Jennifer Mason	Episodes: "Pilot", "The Poet's Fire"
2013	NCIS: Los Angeles	Monica Davis	Episode: "Parley"
2014	Darknet	Joanne	Episode: "Darknet 3"
2014–2015	The Night Shift	Dr. Krista Bell-Hart	Main role (Seasons 1 and 2)
2016	The Walking Dead	Michelle	Episode: "The Same Boat"
2016	Nashville	Vita Martin	2 episodes
2017	Criminal Minds	Fiona Duncan	Recurring role
2017	MacGyver	Harper Hayes	Episode: "Skull + Electromagnet"
2019	Coroner	Sabina	Episodes: "Black Dog", "All's Well", "The Suburbs"
2021	Slasher	Dr. Persephone Trinh/the gentleman	Main role
2021	Private Eyes	Vivian Novak	Episode: In the Arms of Morpheus
2024	So Help Me Todd	Jordana Jecko	Episode: The Tooth Is Out There
2024	Beacon 23	K-Cin	Episodes: "Free", "Disintegration"

== Awards and nominations ==
Year	Award	Category	Work	Result	Ref.
2007	Gemini Awards	Best Performance by an Actress in a Featured Supporting Role in a Dramatic Series	Falcon Beach	Nominated	
