= Lawrence Roeck =

Canadian film director, producer, screenwriter

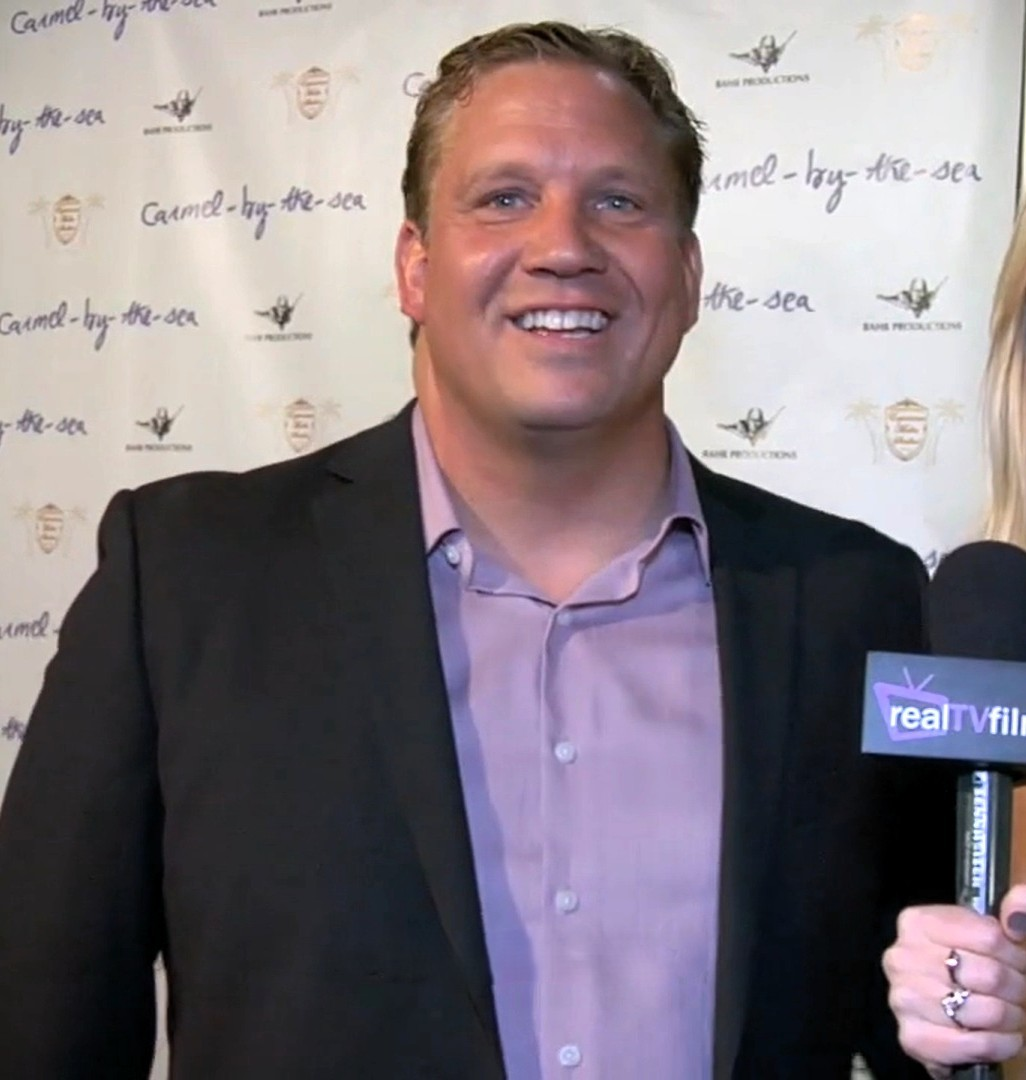
- Roeck in 2011
- Occupations: Film director; screenwriter; film producer
- Years active: 2011–present
- Known for: Diablo; The Forger
- Awards: 2015 Best Feature at San Diego International Film Festival

Lawrence Roeck is an American/Canadian film director, screenwriter and film producer who directed the films Diablo (2015) and The Forger (2011). Roeck won Best Feature at the San Diego International Film Festival in 2015.

== Early life ==
At a very young age, his family moved from Calgary to California. His filmmaking career began in Alberta during the early 1990s by shooting videos with friends just out of high school. While in California, he worked as a video journalist for FOX and CBS News.

== Career ==
=== Early work and Eastwood collaborations ===
Roeck's early professional work included a number of projects associated with the Eastwood family. He was tapped by Clint and Dina Eastwood to create videos for the Make-A-Wish Foundation and to develop a television pilot featuring the South African vocal group Overtone, which was managed by Dina Eastwood. Monterey County Weekly described Roeck during this period as a "go-to guy for the Eastwoods."

Roeck was subsequently hired to work on a Warner Bros. retrospective about Clint Eastwood's career. The project became The Eastwood Factor, narrated by Morgan Freeman. The Calgary Herald later reported that Roeck shot part of The Eastwood Factor and worked on several other projects involving the Eastwood family.

During the same period, Roeck worked with Dina Eastwood and Overtone on early television material connected with the group. The concept preceded the E! reality series Mrs. Eastwood & Company. Roeck later moved away from the television project as his feature-film directing career developed.

=== The Forger ===
Roeck co-wrote and directed The Forger, originally titled Carmel-by-the-Sea, starring Josh Hutcherson, Hayden Panettiere, Lauren Bacall, Alfred Molina, Dina Eastwood and Scott Eastwood. The film was shot primarily in Carmel-by-the-Sea, California.

The film was shot in January 2009. On February 27th, following principal photography, Roeck became involved in litigation with several of the film's investors over control and finances of the production. Investors initially filed legal action against Roeck, suing him for $1.17 million and alleging financial mismanagement. The suit was filed at the Los Angeles County Superior Court stating that he was paid a salary and made use of company assets without their consent.

Roeck denied the allegations and pursued his own legal action against investors involved in the production. Roeck ultimately prevailed in his legal action, obtaining a court order that resulted in the outstanding bills of the film being paid. A production account characterized the dispute as an attempted "hostile takeover" of the film following production.

The dispute delayed post-production for nearly two years. Monterey County Weekly later reported that the two investor suits were mediated out of court and that producer Michael-Ryan Fletchall subsequently supplied financing needed to complete, market and pursue distribution for the picture.

The film was ultimately completed and released as The Forger. It also marked an early feature-film collaboration between Roeck and Scott Eastwood, whom Roeck would later direct in Diablo.

=== Diablo ===
Following The Forger, Roeck developed Diablo, a psychological Western starring Scott Eastwood. Roeck originated the story and developed it with screenwriter Carlos De Los Rios, with Eastwood participating in the development of the film's psychological direction and central twist.

The film starred Eastwood alongside Walton Goggins, Danny Glover, Camilla Belle, Adam Beach, Joaquim de Almeida and Tzi Ma. Veteran cinematographer Dean Cundey, whose credits include Halloween, Back to the Future and Jurassic Park, served as director of photography.

Roeck and Cundey combined traditional widescreen Western photography with emerging drone technology to capture the Alberta landscape and Eastwood's character traveling through it. Published interviews with Roeck discussed Cundey's willingness to incorporate drones into the production and their use for aerial photography.

Diablo premiered at the San Diego International Film Festival, where it won Best Feature. Following its festival premiere, Momentum Pictures and Orion Releasing acquired worldwide distribution rights to the film. The film was released theatrically and through video-on-demand in January 2016.

=== Carmel International Film Festival ===
In 2024, Roeck and producer Annette Andersen revived the Carmel International Film Festival following a multi-year absence. The previous incarnation of the festival, founded in 2008, had ceased operations in 2018. Roeck and Andersen began discussing its revival during the COVID-19 pandemic, believing the loss of the festival had left a gap in Carmel's cultural community.

The revived festival returned in 2024 at the historic Golden Bough Playhouse, combining international and regional independent films with filmmaker Q&As, industry events and programming celebrating Carmel and the Monterey Peninsula's artistic history. Guests included animator Van Partible, actor Will Roberts and producer Lee Caplin.

Following the 2024 revival, Roeck and Andersen expanded the festival to four days in 2025. The expanded program brought prominent film and television figures to Carmel, including actor and filmmaker Mark Duplass, director and actor Katie Aselton, composer Mark Mancina, writer-producer Graham Yost and cinematographer Dean Cundey. Roeck moderated industry discussions on producing and cinematography, including panels featuring Mancina, Yost, Duplass and Cundey.

The festival also expanded its charitable programming through a partnership with Duplass and Aselton's Soul Points Fund benefiting people affected by the Los Angeles wildfires. Under Roeck and Andersen's leadership, the revived festival has combined independent film competition, filmmaker networking, industry programming and an emphasis on Carmel's history as an arts community.

== Filmography ==
Year	Title	Director	Writer	Producer	Notes
2010	The Eastwood Factor	No	No	No	Camera operator
2012	The Forger	Yes	Co-writer	No	
2015	Diablo	Yes	Story	Yes	Also executive producer
TBA	The Carmel Crowd	Yes	Yes	Yes	Also cinematographer
