= Air (Stargate Universe) =

Opening story of the first season

- Stargate Universe episodes
- Episode nos.: Season 1 Episodes 1–3
- Directed by: Andy Mikita
- Written by: Robert C. Cooper & Brad Wright
- Production code: 101–103
- Original air dates: October 2, 2009 (Parts 1 & 2); October 9, 2009 (Part 3)

Guest appearances
- Richard Dean Anderson as Jack O'Neill; Michael Shanks as Daniel Jackson; Amanda Tapping as Samantha Carter; Gary Jones as Walter Harriman; Bill Dow as Bill Lee; Lou Diamond Phillips as David Telford; Ming-Na as Camile Wray; Jeffrey Bowyer-Chapman as Darren Becker; Christopher McDonald as Alan Armstrong; Ona Grauer as Emily Young; Martin Christopher as Kevin Marks; Julia Benson as Vanessa James; Haig Sutherland as Hunter Riley; Jennifer Spence as Lisa Park; Peter Kelamis as Adam Brody; Mark Burgess as Jeremy Franklin; Josh Blacker as Spencer; Patrick Gilmore as Dale Volker; Bradley Stryker as Curtis; Christina Schild as Andrea Palmer

Episode chronology
← Previous —	Next → "Darkness"

"Air" is the three-part opening episode of the military science fiction television series Stargate Universe. The first two parts aired on Syfy in the United States on October 2, 2009, while the third part aired on October 9. In Canada, SPACE aired the first two in tandem with Syfy. Sky1 broadcast the first two parts on October 6, and the third on October 13, whilst Sci Fi Australia aired the two-parter on October 9, and the third part on October 16. "Air" was written by series creators Robert C. Cooper and Brad Wright, and was directed by Andy Mikita.

In the episode a group of evacuees from Icarus Base, an offworld human outpost that fell under attack end up on the Destiny, an Ancient starship located several billion light-years from Earth. Their first problems involve the ship's failing life support system, where the new crew are tasked to fix it. The episode features some of the well known characters from Stargate SG-1, a previous series in the Stargate franchise. Parts of the third part are filmed on location in White Sands, New Mexico, which doubled as a desert planet. The first two parts received generally positive reviews, mainly commending the cast and the style of the episode. The premiere was seen by over 2.3 million Americans, and was considered a ratings success in Australia, Canada and the United Kingdom.

== Plot ==
=== Part 1 ===
The majority of the first part takes place in flashbacks while a team of ill-equipped soldiers and scientists arrive at the Destiny. Eli Wallace (David Blue) solves a mathematical equation in an online computer game, planted there by Stargate Command. For his achievement, Dr. Nicholas Rush (Robert Carlyle) and Lieutenant General Jack O'Neill (Richard Dean Anderson) recruit Wallace to the Icarus program, which is attempting to dial a nine-chevron address with the Stargate. Wallace's solution is the key to controlling the power levels for the Gate. He is taken aboard the Hammond, an Earth Daedalus-class starship, to be taken to the planet where Icarus is set up. During the journey, he meets Chloe Armstrong (Elyse Levesque), daughter of Senator Alan Armstrong (Christopher McDonald).

At the top-secret Icarus Base, the group is introduced to Colonel Everett Young (Louis Ferreira), Colonel David Telford (Lou Diamond Phillips), and First Lieutenant Matthew Scott (Brian J. Smith). Wallace's solution is tested but fails to establish a lock. During dinner, three Ha'tak vessels, believed to be under the control of the Lucian Alliance, attack the planet. An evacuation is begun while the Hammond which is crewed by Colonel Samantha Carter (Amanda Tapping) and a squadron of F-302s led by Colonel Telford battle the enemy. Rush, desperate to see his project succeed, enlists Wallace's aid in figuring out what went wrong. Wallace suggests that the final symbol of the address is wrong, and that they should use the symbol for Earth. Rush aborts the dialing sequence to Earth, arguing that the energy release from the exploding planet could follow them through the Gate, and tests the theory, which succeeds. With the planet's unstable core about to go critical and lacking any other means of escape, the remaining survivors in the base (roughly 80 people) are forced to risk heading to an unknown destination. The planet explodes shortly after everyone is evacuated, destroying the three Ha'tak vessels. The Hammond survives, but the fate of those in the base is a mystery to Stargate Command.

=== Part 2 ===
The unlikely expedition team ends up on the Destiny, an Ancient starship located billions of light-years from Earth. The ship jumps to FTL shortly after the Stargate shuts down. Rush uses an Ancient communication device to contact Stargate command, taking control of Bill Lee (Bill Dow). When he returns, Rush claims that O'Neill put him in charge of the expedition, though the others are not quick to believe him. Meanwhile, the ship, having suffered millennia of wear and tear, has a failing life support system and an inadequately sealed hull breach in one of the shuttles, which can be sealed only from inside the shuttle. Senator Armstrong learns of this and, already badly injured, sacrifices his life to seal the shuttle off and buy the team time. However, the main life support is not so easily fixed. The CO_{2} scrubbers are decayed beyond repair, and within a day carbon dioxide poisoning will kill everyone. The Destiny, apparently aware of the problem, drops out of FTL and dials the Stargate to a desert planet with the necessary materials to repair the scrubbers. Four other locations are listed but locked out by the dialing computer. A 12-hour countdown begins, at the end of which the Destiny will continue on its journey automatically.

=== Part 3 ===
On the desert planet, the search begins for a suitable source of lime to filter the air on Destiny. The sand itself has a small concentration of calcite, but not enough to be useful, so the team starts looking for a dry lake bed, which should have heavy deposits of lime. The group splits into two: Rush, Scott and Ronald Greer (Jamil Walker Smith) form one group, while Wallace leads the remainder in a different direction. After several failed tests, those in Wallace's group give up on the search, instead intending to try out the Stargate addresses the Destiny rejected. When Wallace informs the others, Scott sends Rush and Greer back to stop them while he continues searching. They make it back in time to stop Franklin (Mark Burgess), the member carrying the dialing remote, but the other two make it through. Rush is vehemently against the idea of exploring the other addresses, believing that the ship locked them out for a reason, and several failed attempts to contact the two lost expedition members seem to support his concerns.

On the ship, Chloe and Young use the communication stones to contact Earth, allowing Chloe to inform her mother of her situation and Senator Armstrong's death. Young, meanwhile, is encouraged by O'Neill to repair the ship; in spite of his protests that their expedition is not cut out for it, O'Neill insists that no one really is ready for their kind of work.

In his search for the lime, Scott discovers a strange, swirling cloud of dust that absorbs moisture. He follows it until he collapses in front of a lake bed. He has a brief hallucination where he engages in a spiritual conversation with a priest he knew on Earth. Meanwhile, the cloud moves up to him and condenses into water, waking him. Realizing what he's found, Scott shovels as much of the lime as possible into his bag and makes his way to the Gate. Greer, having set out to look for him, finds him along the way and helps carry the lime. Wallace sticks his arm into the wormhole to delay the countdown. The team returns with the lime successfully, which is used to repair the CO_{2} scrubbers. In the end, a recovering Scott tells Chloe that his parents and the priest died when he was young, and that the best way to deal with the grief is to keep moving forward. As everyone starts to breathe easier, a ship detaches itself from the Destiny.

== Production ==
=== Conception ===
"Air" first surfaced in December 2008 as a working title for the opening episode of Universe, where it was suggested to be a three-parter, according to executive producer Joseph Mallozzi. With casting concerned, several of the previous SG-1 characters made an appearance for the series premiere, including Michael Shanks, who reprises his role as Doctor Daniel Jackson in a cameo, Richard Dean Anderson as General Jack O'Neill, Gary Jones as Walter Harriman, Amanda Tapping as Samantha Carter, Bill Dow as Doctor Bill Lee and Martin Christopher as Kevin Marks. Christopher McDonald of Happy Gilmore and Requiem for a Dream fame made a "pivotal" guest appearance as Senator Alan Armstrong, father of series regular, Chloe Armstrong (Elyse Levesque). Another guest star is Ona Grauer, previously known for playing the Ancient Ayiana in Stargate SG-1's "Frozen" and Stargate Atlantis's "Rising".

=== Filming ===
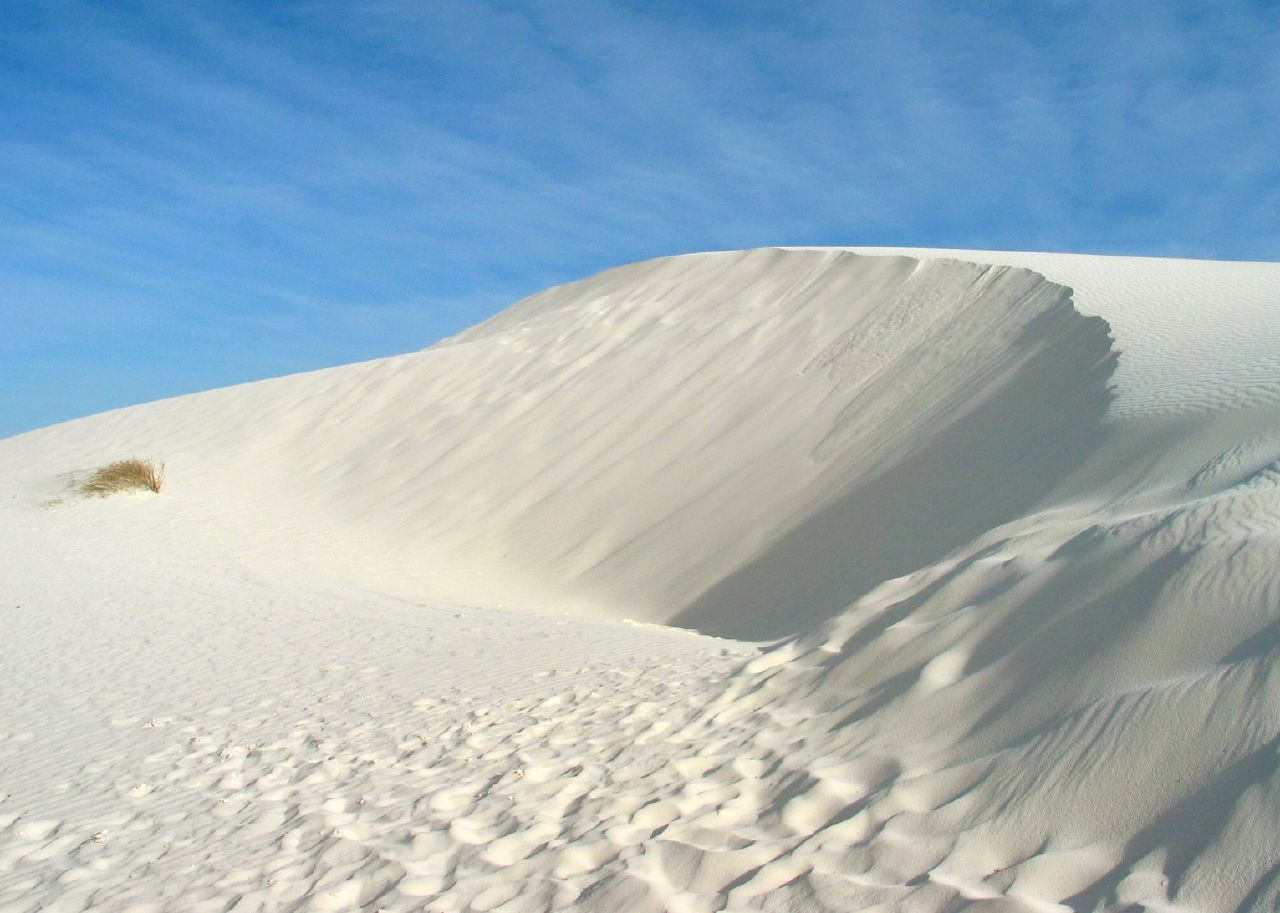
Parts of the third episode were filmed on location in White Sands, New Mexico.

"Air" was directed by Andy Mikita. When filming the first three episodes, Brad Wright and Robert C. Cooper decided to hire the Director of Photography from The Shield. The shooting for the episode started on February 18, 2009. The show is filmed on stages 2, 4 (Destiny set) and 5 (Icarus Base set) at The Bridge Studios Previous franchise series Stargate SG-1 and Stargate Atlantis were filmed on stage 5 and 6. "Air (Part 3)" was filmed in and around Alamogordo, New Mexico from late April through early May 2009. A couple of scenes were deleted from the actual outtake, the two most notable being a scene with Eli Wallace (David Blue) on the desert planet and a flashbacks scene featuring Chloe Armstrong and her mother. The game Wallace played when solving the puzzle was a preview shot of Stargate Worlds, a massively multiplayer online role-playing game based on the Stargate franchise. The game was referenced throughout the pilot. The announcement of Stargate Worlds marked the first bit of news published on the game's official website since May 26, 2009.

== Reception ==
=== Ratings and viewership ===
The first two parts received a total household rating of 1.7, which represents 2.35 million viewers on Syfy, which was the best franchise's season premiere since the second season premiere of Stargate Atlantis. Among the figures, 1.32 million were viewed by adults in the 25-54 age demographic, and 1.12 million among the 18-49 demographic. Part 3 gathered 2.4 million viewers, a small increase from the season premiere. In both cases, the ratings were higher than Fox's Dollhouse, which aired on the same time slot. Plus the 7 DVR, the second part reached a household rating of 2.1, totalling 2.99 million viewers, including 1.7 million Adults 18-49 and 1.85 million Adults 25–54. This makes "Air" the most viewed Stargate episode since March 2005.

After its premiere in Canada, the first two parts were seen by 565,000, which made it SPACE's most viewed single episode in its run. This also made Stargate Universe the number 1 non-sports speciality program of the day. Including the ratings from two additional airings the following day also totalled the ratings up to 2.3 million, comparable to the US release. In the United Kingdom, the first part was seen by 1.165 million viewers, while the second part were seen by 1.061 million, placing Stargate Universe the first and second most viewed series the week it aired on Sky1, and the UK's highest Stargate audience in five years. The third part was seen by 765,000 viewers, again making it the most watched programme on the multichannel TV station. The Sci Fi Channel Australia premiere of the episode attracted 149,000 viewers, becoming the second most watched episode that week, while being bested by a soccer match.

=== Critical reception ===
"SGU marries many familiar sci-fi conventions with relatable emotional stories to create a non-genre spectacular. If you root for the underdog, you'll love this completely enthralling, heartbreaking and inspiring epic.

— Curt Wagner of Chicago Now

Reviews of the premiere were generally positive. According to Metacritic, which assigns a normalized rating out of 100 to reviews from mainstream critics, the premiere has received a "generally favorable" score of 61, based on 9 reviews. In all three cases the film ranks lowest in the series. Joseph Dilworth Jr. of Pop Culture Zoo praised the premiere of Stargate Universe, stating that it "feels less like a weekly TV series and much more like the beginning of a twenty part long form story," and is also described as a cross between Star Trek: Voyager, Battlestar Galactica and Firefly, though the series seems to be a spiritual successor to Battlestar. Dilworth also praised the cast, stating it as "one of the finest ensemble casts I've seen in a long time." Curt Wagner of Chicago Now rated the episode 4 stars out of four, stating that it shares the optimism of Star Trek: Voyager, and the grimness of Battlestar Galactica, as well as playing homage to its franchise forebears SG-1 and Atlantis, but looks and feels new. IGN reviewer Ramsey Isler gave the episode 8.8 out of 10, starting his review with "Yes, it's another Stargate show. But this might become the best of them all." Further saying the premiere had its "own unique tone."

Being one of the few Stargate franchise releases that were well received by major media publishers, Mike Hale from The New York Times was generally positive towards the pilot episodes, saying the Stargate franchise was "catching up" with the long-running Star Trek franchise. Hale also agreed with Syfy's promotion of it being an "edgier" Stargate. The Boston Globe reviewer Joanna Weiss also reacted positively towards the pilot episodes, saying it felt like "early Lost", while the story arc followed the patterns of "Battlestar Galactica". Mark Wilson from About.com gave the episode four-and-a-half stars out of 5, saying Universe accomplishes what Stargate Atlantis was not able to, and said it was "exceptionally well made" compared to other shows. The Pittsburgh Post-Gazette both praised the show, calling it "intriguing", for not abandoning its premise as Star Trek: Voyager did and criticized it by pointing out that the characters spend "far too much time wandering a desert planet" in "Air (Part 3)". The Pittsburgh Post-Gazette summarized their review by saying that, "[g]iven time, Stargate Universe may become worth watching if it develops its characters and continues to mine its premise for stories." David Hinckley, a reviewer from The New York Daily News gave the episodes four-out-of-five stars, saying that "Eli's not the only one playing a high-stakes game here."

Among reviewers who were negative towards the new installments was Maureen Ryan from the Chicago Tribune. The reviewer wrote that the "gloomy, underwhelming Universe seems to have ditched many of the elements that the previous "Stargate" shows had, notably camaraderie and a sense of adventure, without adding much in the way of narrative suspense or complexity." The only characters she felt were "worth following" were Eli Wallace (David Blue) and Nicholas Rush (Robert Carlyle). Vince Horiuchi from The Salt Lake Tribune started the review with "Syfy Channel -- is one of the worst displays of the genre on television," and attacked the television series, "Battlestar Galactica". Having no interest in the previous Stargate series' including the feature film, while not overall positive to the series, he said the cast and characters were a "little more likable and interesting." Reviewer Laura Freis from Variety magazine concluded her review with "Sure, SGU is grittier, darker and psychologically deeper than previous versions. But so far, it's also a lot less fun." While negative towards the show, she called Robert Carlyle an "excellent" actor. The Hollywood Reporter noted a lack of "intelligent" and "surprising stories" and was overall negative towards Stargate Universe, and even more so on the previous Stargate franchise releases.

=== Awards and nominations ===
In January 2010, the episodes were nominated for a Visual Effects Society Award for "Outstanding Visual Effects in a Broadcast Series", against Battlestar Galactica, V, Defying Gravity and Fringe. They were also nominated for four Leo Awards in 2010; one resulted in a win. Mike Banas was nominated for "Best Picture Editing for a Dramatic Series", James C. D. Robbins for "Best Production Design in a Dramatic Series", and James Bamford for "Best Stunt Coordination in a Dramatic Series." Mark Savela and the special effects team won the Leo Award for "Best Visual Effects in a Dramatic Series" for their work in the episodes. In July 2010, the visual effects team were nominated for a Primetime Emmy Award for Outstanding Special Visual Effects, along with "Space" for the upcoming 62nd Primetime Emmy Awards.
