= Gatecon =

Stargate fan convention

Gatecon Conventions
- Gatecon's logo
- Status: Active
- Genre: Science fiction
- Begins: September 1, 2022
- Ends: September 5, 2022
- Venue: Sheraton Vancouver Airport Hotel
- Locations: Vancouver, British Columbia, Canada
- Inaugurated: September 22, 2000; 26 years ago
- Founders: Allan Gowen, Kathryn Rogers, Richard Pasco, Sue Seeley
- Most recent: September 1, 2022; 4 years ago
- Organizer: Gatecon Events
- Website: www.gatecon.com

Gatecon is a fan convention centered on the Stargate television franchise. The first Gatecon was held in 2000 in Vancouver, Canada, with the convention being held annually until 2008. Since 2008 the event has been held sporadically. The event has included tours of the Stargate SG-1 (1997–2006), Stargate Atlantis (2004–2009) and Stargate Universe (2010–2011) sets at The Bridge Studios.

A number of different charities have been supported by Gatecon, including Make A Wish Foundation, Sea Shepherd Conservation Society and Cystic Fibrosis Canada, with MGM and the shows creators providing props and memorabilia to be auctioned off.

== History ==
The event was conceived by four fans of the series: Allan Gowen from Australia, Sue Seeley from the United States and Richard Pasco and Kathryn Rogers from the United Kingdom. The group first came up with the idea in 1998 and spent the following two years trying to attract the attention of MGM and Showtime, before holding the first Gatecon in 2000 in the city of Vancouver due to its close proximity to The Bridge Studios in Burnaby, Canada where Stargate SG-1 was filmed. Hank Cohen, the then president of MGM Television was so impressed with the group, he flew from Los Angeles to attend the first event. Gatecon celebrated its 5th anniversary in July 2004, which was a sell out with 700 attendees. It had around 30 guests over the 3-day event. It was also the first time Amanda Tapping, Christopher Judge, and Michael Shanks had a panel together at Gatecon. Charity auctions and donations took place for Cystic Fibrosis Canada and Make A Wish Foundation.

The year 2006 marked the first time Gatecon was held in the United Kingdom, with the event taking place at the University of Gloucestershire campus in Cheltenham. The positive response meant that the event returned to the UK the following year in 2007, this time in Reading. In 2008, Gatecon returned to Vancouver, Canada and featured Gatecon's first appearance of Richard Dean Anderson, who portrays Jack O'Neill in Stargate SG-1 and its spinoff series Stargate Atlantis and Stargate Universe. The events charity auction of props and memorabilia raised over USD 28,000 for Sea Shepherd Conservation Society, of which Anderson is a member of the board. In 2009, it was announced that Gatecon 2010 would be the last, with Richard Pasco commenting: "Gatecon has had an incredible run, and the fans, actors, and studios have been amazingly supportive of us, but we have decided to go out on a high note after our tenth convention". Pasco attributed the decision to end Gatecon as being down to the increase in corporate run conventions. The event raised over USD 100,000 across the weekend for the Sea Shepherd Conservation Society.

After a six year hiatus, it was announced that Gatecon would return in 2016. Fundraising from the event would go towards Sea Shepherd Conservation Society as well as Sanctuary for Kids, a charity founded by Amanda Tapping. The event again returned in 2018, titled Gatecon: The Invasion, taking place in September 2018, at the Sheraton Vancouver Airport hotel. A 20th Anniversary Gatecon called Full Circle had been scheduled for 2020, however was postponed due to COVID-19. Instead, recordings from previous Gatecons were made available online to stream. The 20th Anniversary was eventually rescheduled for September 1-5 2022 and renamed The Celebration, taking place in Vancouver once more. The online magazine, The Companion announced in May 2022 that they would be partnering with Gatecon 2022. The fansite Dial the Gate also announced that they would be partnering with Gatecon and streaming at least two of the panels live onto Youtube. Numerous props and a replica Stargate were displayed at the 2022 event.

== Events ==
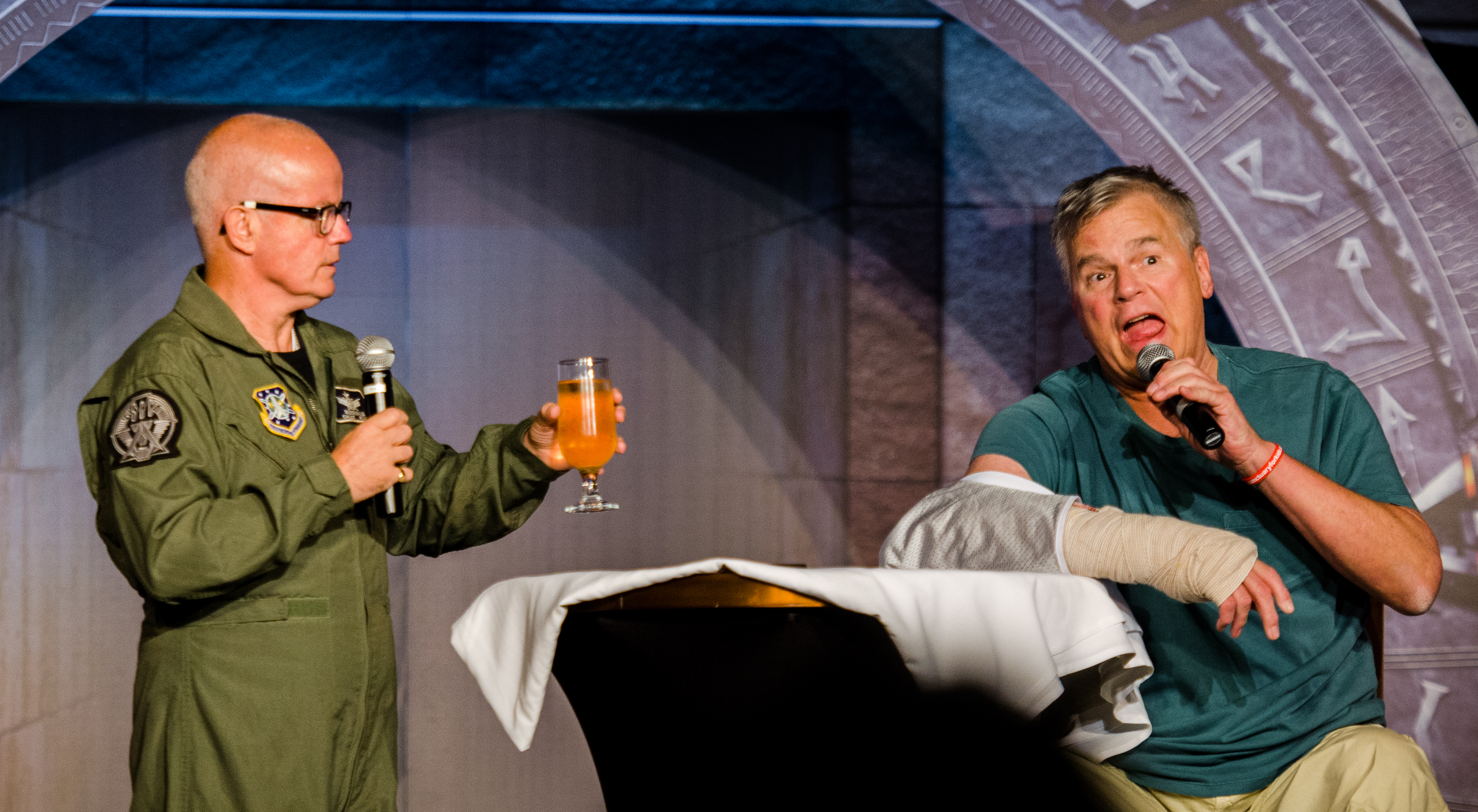
Gary Jones who plays Walter Harriman with Richard Dean Anderson, who portrayed Jack O'Neill in all three Stargate television series pictured at Gatecon.

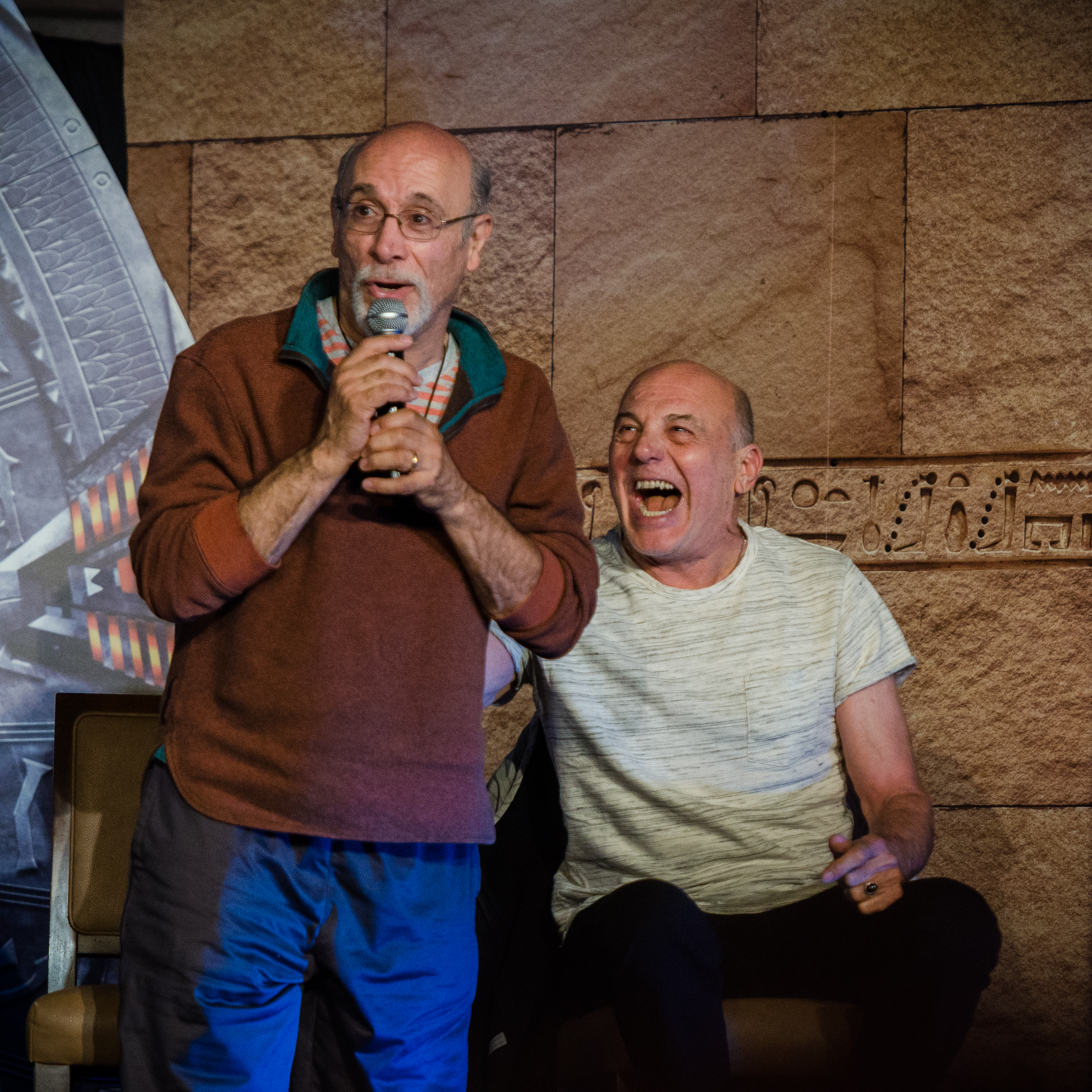
Tony Amendola who portrays Bra'tac and Carmen Argenziano who portrayed Jacob Carter in Stargate SG-1 at Gatecon 2016

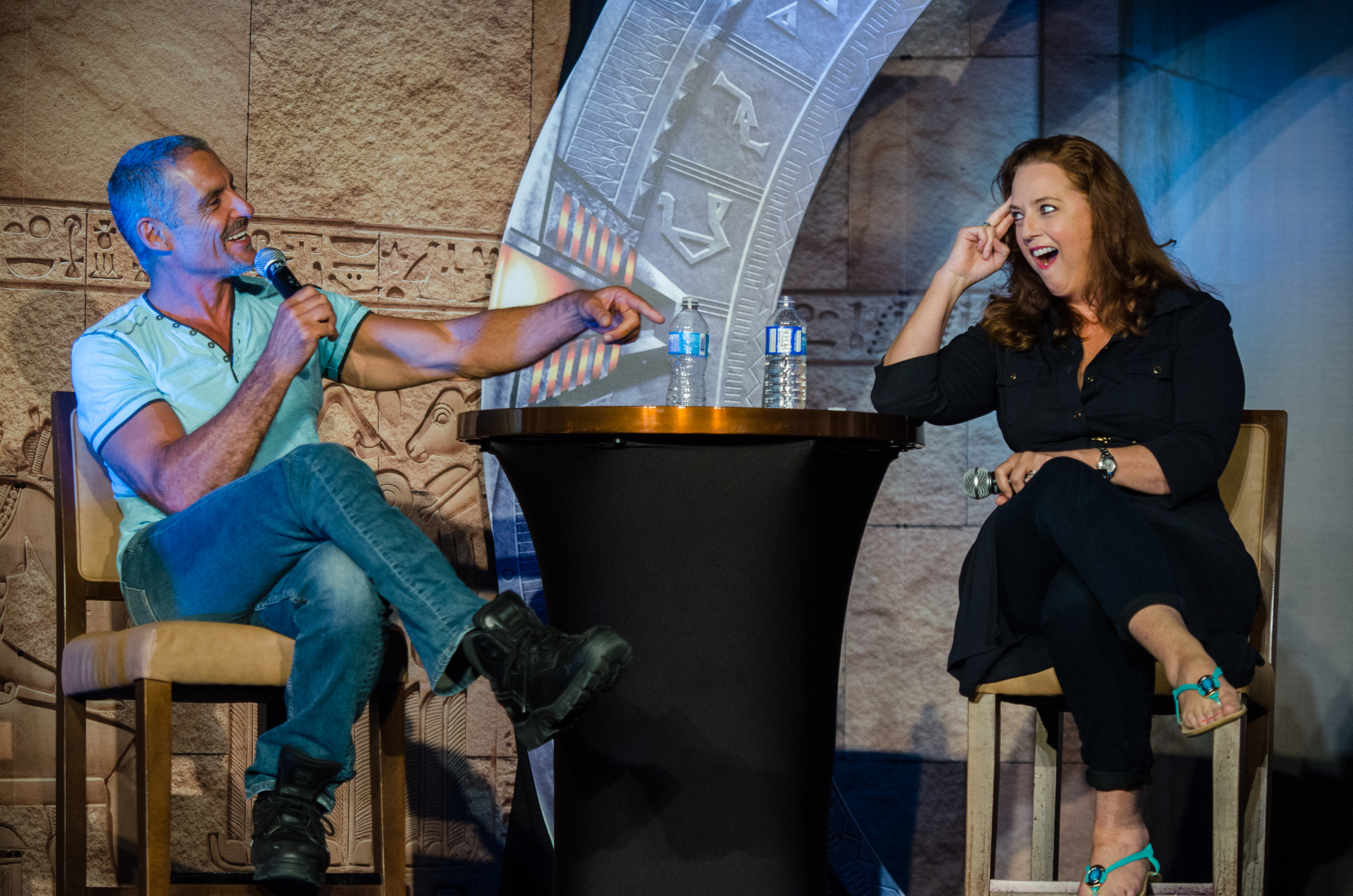
Cliff Simon and Suanne Braun who play the Goa'uld System lords Ba'al and Hathor in Stargate SG-1 at Gatecon 2016.

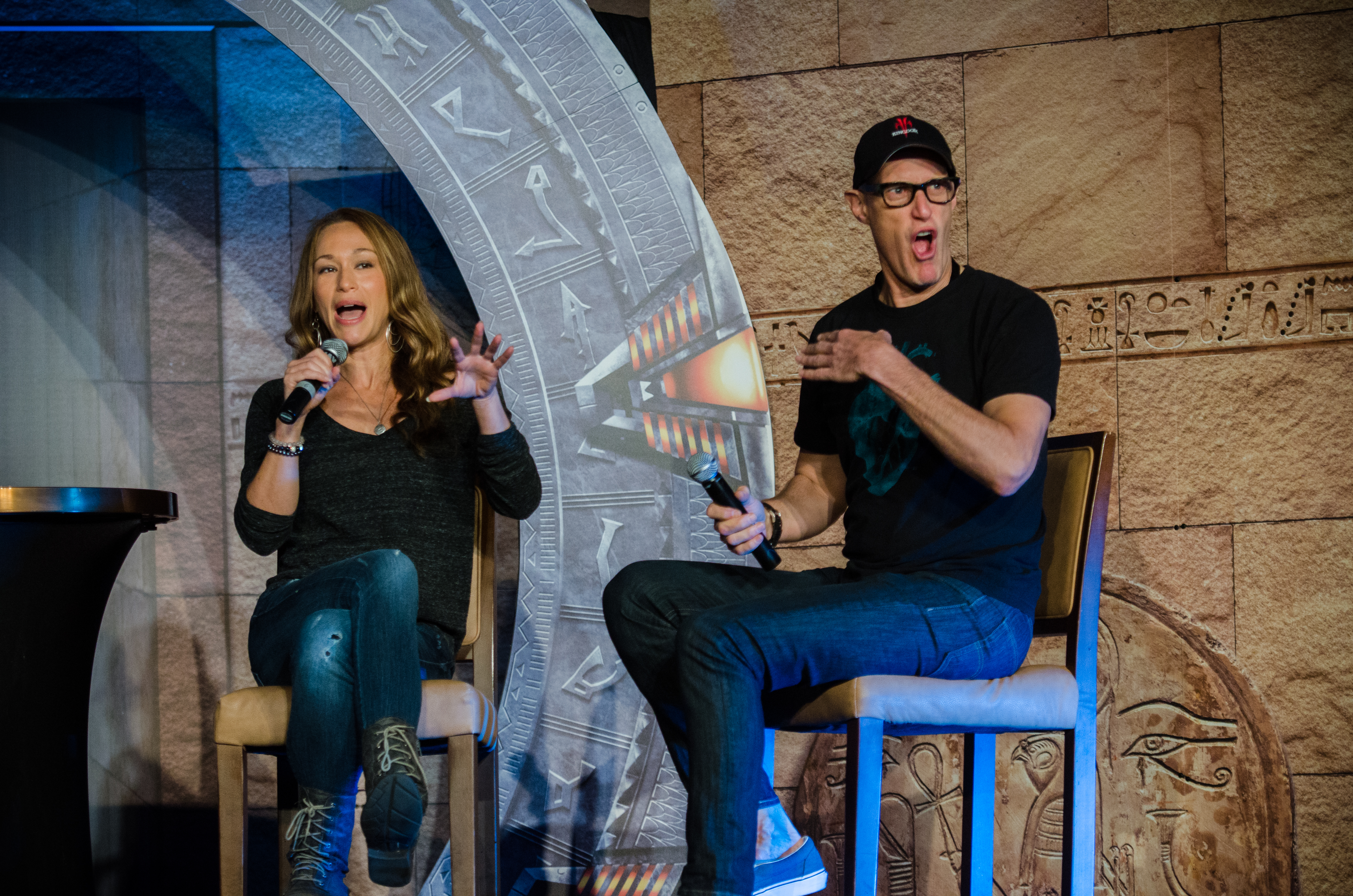
Sharon Taylor who portrays Amelia Banks in Stargate Atlantis and Christopher Heyerdahl who portrayed Pallan in Stargate SG-1 and the characters of Todd and Halling in Stargate Atlantis pictured at Gatecon 2016.

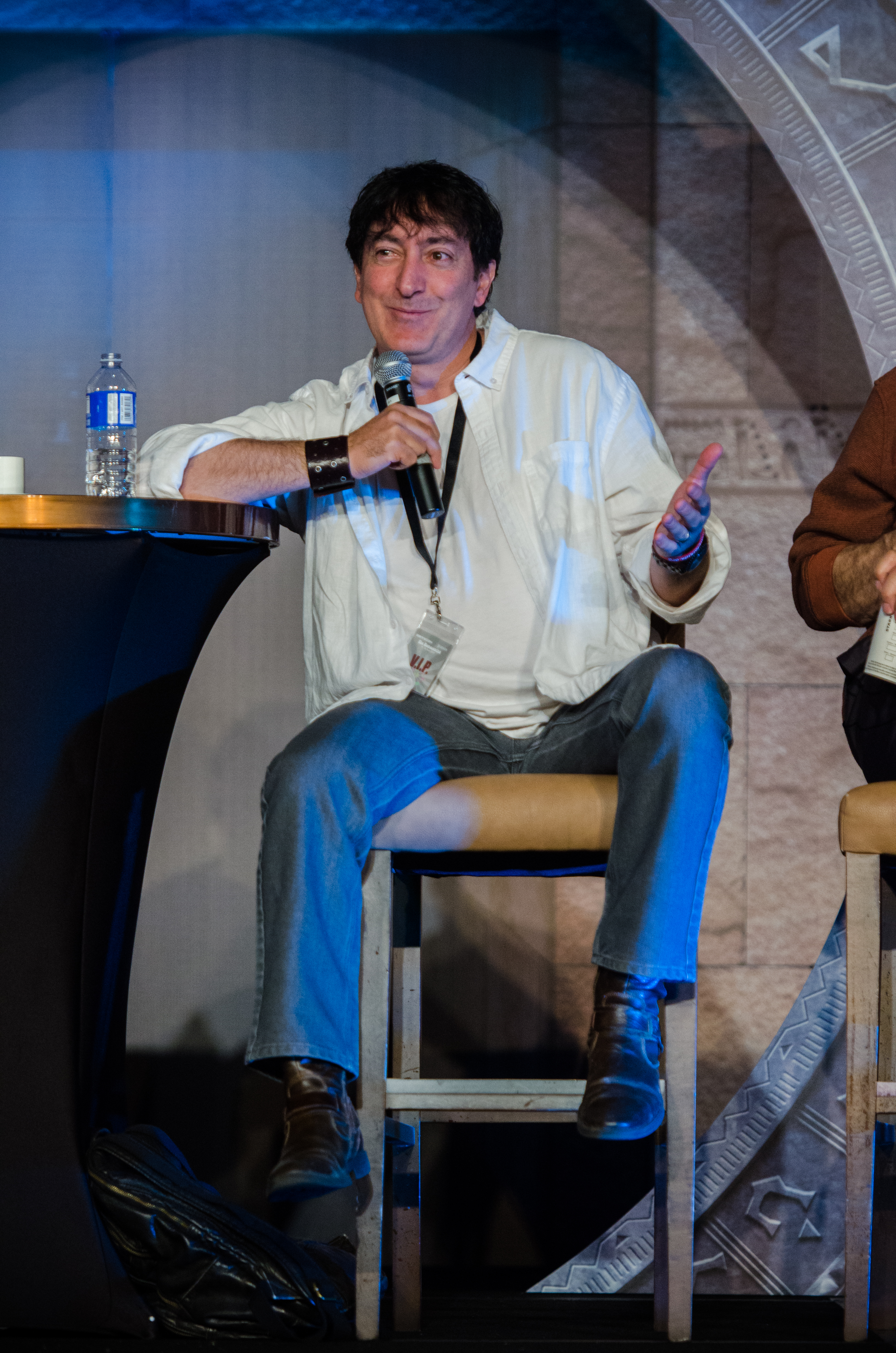
Peter Kelamis who portrays Adam Brody in Stargate Universe.

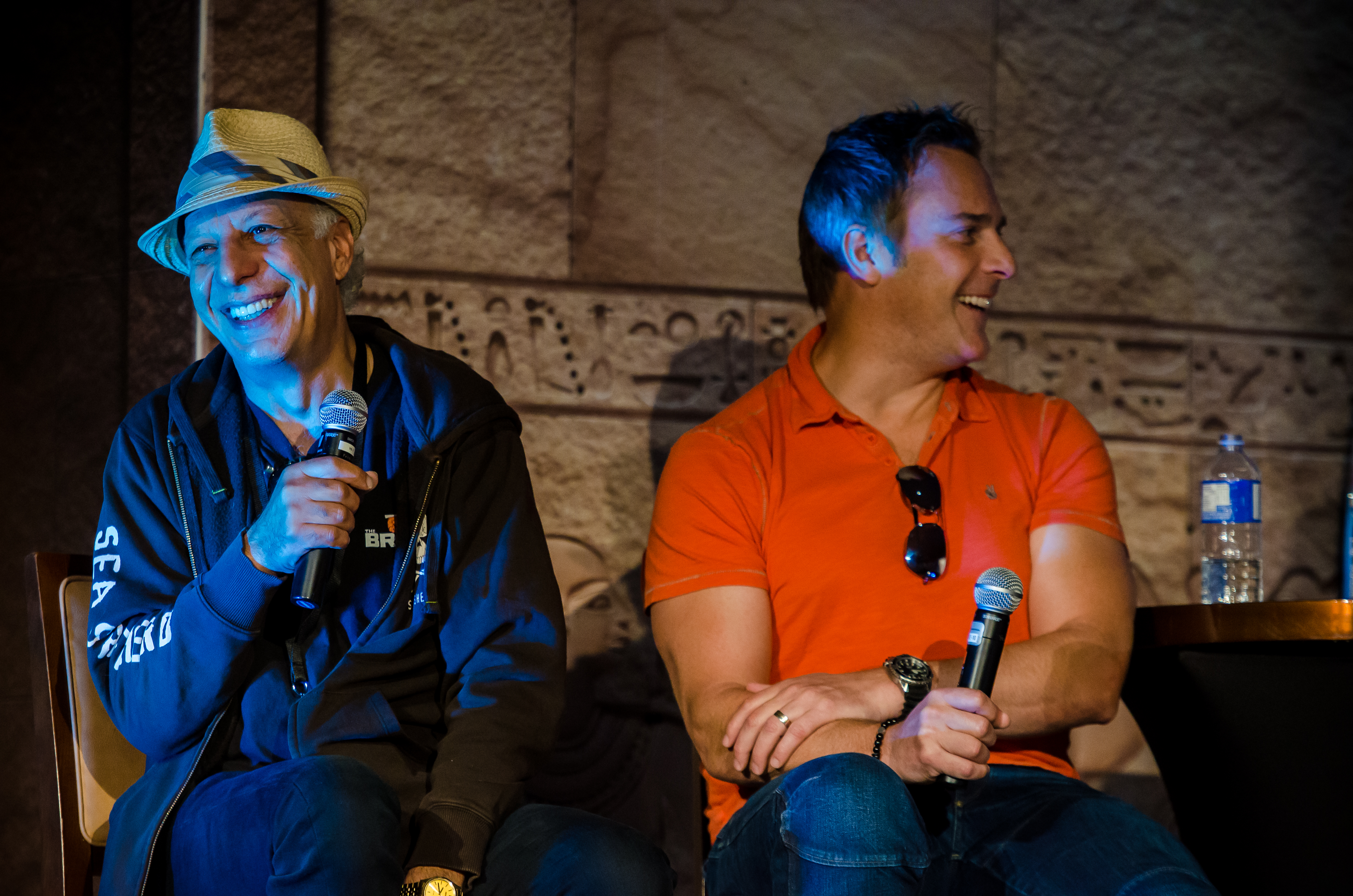
Erick Avari who portrayed Kasuf in Stargate & Stargate SG-1 next to Mike Dopud who played multiple characters across Stargate SG-1, Stargate Atlantis and Stargate Universe.

No.	Dates	Location	Guests
			Guests in **bold** are the series writers, directors, or cast members with at least 50 Stargate-related credits to their name.
1	22–24 September 2000	Radisson Hotel, Burnaby, British Columbia	**Amanda Tapping**, **Brad Wright**, Bridget Mcguire, **Christopher Judge**, **Dan Shea**, **Don S. Davis**, **Gary Jones**, James Tichenor, Jan Newman, Jay Acovone, Jim Menard, JR Bourne, Lynn Smith, Michael Greenburg, **Peter DeLuise**, Peter Williams, Richard Hudolin, Rick Dean, **Robert C. Cooper**, **Teryl Rothery**, Tony Amendola, and Wray Douglas
2	20–23 September 2001	Best Western, Richmond, Vancouver	Alexis Cruz, **Amanda Tapping**, **Brad Wright**, Colin Cunningham, **Don S. Davis**, Erick Avari, Jay Acovone, Jay Brazeau, JR Bourne, Peter Williams, **Robert C. Cooper**, Tony Amendola, and Virginia Hey
3	11–16 September 2002	Best Western, Richmond, Vancouver	Alexis Cruz, **Amanda Tapping**, **Brad Wright**, Colin Cunningham, Corin Nemec, **Don S. Davis**, Frida Betrani, **Gary Jones**, Joe Mallozzi, JR Bourne, **Martin Wood**, Peter Williams, Ron Halder, Sarah Douglas, Suanne Braun, **Teryl Rothery**, and Wil de Vry
4	11–14 September 2003	Best Western, Richmond, Vancouver	Alex Zahara, Bruce Woloshyn, Colin Cunningham, Corin Nemec, **Dan Shea**, David Palffy, David Sinclair, **Don S. Davis**, Douglas Arthurs, Frida Betrani, Jacqueline Samuda, JR Bourne, Michael Greenburg, **Michael Shanks**, Peter Williams, Steve Makaj, and **Teryl Rothery**
5	14–19 July 2004	Best Western, Richmond, Vancouver	Alex Zahara, **Amanda Tapping**, Andrew Jackson, Andrew Kavadas, Brent Stait, Bruce Woloshyn, Christian Bochet, **Christopher Judge**, Colin Cunningham, Corin Nemec, Dan Payne, **Dan Shea**, David Palffy, David Winning, **Don S. Davis**, Douglas Arthurs, Erick Avari, Frida Betrani, **Gary Jones**, Jason Schombing, Jerry Rector, John Novak, JR Bourne, **Michael Shanks**, Peter Williams, Steve Bacic, **Teryl Rothery**, and Virginia Hey.
6	28–31 July 2005	Best Western, Richmond, Vancouver	Aaron Douglas, Aidan Drummond, Alan Peterson, Alan Scarfe, Alan VanSprang, Alex Zahara, Alonso Oyarzun, Andrew Jackson, Andrew Kavadas, Barbara March, Bruce Woloshyn, Christopher Heyerdahl, Chris Kramer, Colin Cunningham, Dan Payne, David Franklin, David Winning, Dirk Benedict, Douglas Arthurs, Ellen Dubin, Fulvio Cecere, **Gary Jones**, Gwynyth Walsh, Herb Jefferson, Jason Schombing, Jason Toddipson, Jerry Rector, John Novak, Jon Cooksey, JR Bourne, Kevin Sorbo, Lani Tupu, Lisa Ryder, Lorena Gale, Nathaniel Arcand, Paul Campbell, Peter Kent, Richard Hatch, Robert Picardo, Steve Bacic, and Tahmoh Penikett
7	10–13 August 2006	University of Gloucestershire, Cheltenham, England	Colin Cunningham, Corin Nemec, Erick Avari, Steve Bacic, and Suanne Braun
8	19–21 October 2007	The Renaissance Hotel, Reading, England	Cliff Simon, Colin Cunningham, JR Bourne, Michael Welch, and Suanne Braun
9	21–24 August 2008	The Sheraton Wall Centre, Vancouver, Canada	Alex Earl, Alex Zahara, **Amanda Tapping**, Andee Frizzell, Barry Campbell, Bruce Woloshyn, Cliff Simon, Corin Nemec, Dan Payne, David Winning, Dean Haglund, Eric Cheng (photographer), Garwin Sanford, **Gary Jones**, Kim McCoy, Captain Paul Watson (Sea Shepherd Society), Peter Williams, **Richard Dean Anderson**, and Simon Ager
10	8–11 July 2010	The Sheraton Wall Centre, Vancouver, Canada	Andee Frizzell, Barry Campbell, Bruce Woloshyn, Cliff Simon, Colin Cunningham, Corin Nemec, **Dan Shea**, Dean Ayelsworth, Dylan Neal, Erick Avari, Garry Chalk, Jay Acovone, Jerry Rector, John de Lancie, JR Bourne, Martin Wood, Musetta Vander, **Paul McGillion**, Sabine Bauer, Scott Schwartz, Simon Ager, Steve Bacic, and Vanessa Angel
11	8–12 September 2016	Sheraton Vancouver Airport, Vancouver, Canada	Aaron Pearl, Alex Zahara, Andrew Jackson, Barry Campbell, Bill Dow, Bruce Woloshyn, Carmen Argenziano, Christopher Heyerdahl, Cliff Simon, Corin Nemec, Dan Payne, **Dan Shea**, **David Nykl**, Dean Aylesworth, Douglas Arthurs, Emilie Ullerup, Erick Avari, Garwin Sanford, **Gary Jones**, Jacqueline Samuda, Jeff Hansen, Jennifer Spence, Jill Teed, Jodelle Ferland, Laura Harper, Mark Haynes, **Martin Wood**, Mika McKinnon, Mike Dopud, Mike McLean, Patrick Currie, Captain Paul Watson (Sea Shepherd Society), Peter Kelamis, Peter Williams, **Richard Dean Anderson**, Roger Cross, Sabine Bauer, Sally Malcolm, Sharon Taylor, Simon Ager, Steve Bacic, Suanne Braun, Susannah Sinard, Tom McBeath, and Tony Amendola
12	13–16 September 2018	Sheraton Vancouver Airport, Vancouver, Canada	Andrew Jackson, Barry Campbell, **Gary Jones**, Jill Teed, **Martin Wood**, Alexis Cruz, Colin Cunningham, Sabine Bauer, Mark Haynes, JC Vaughn, Frida Betrani, Mike Dopud, Steve Bacic, Dan Shea, Mika McKinnon. Rainbow Sun Francks, **Amanda Tapping**, **Michael Shanks**, Lexa Doig, Teryl Rothery, Megan Leitch, **Paul McGillion**, David Deluise, Alex Zahara, Andee Frizzell, Patrick Currie, Peter Flemming, Dean Aylesworth, Simone Bailly, Sharon Taylor, Herbert Duncanson, Douglas Arthurs, Bruce Woloshyn, **Brad Wright**, Jacqueline Samuda, Cliff Simon, Bill Butt, Peter Kelamis, **Christopher Judge**, Peter Williams, Mark Nicholson, Stefan Zadorozny, Stargate Network.
13	1-5 September 2022	Sheraton Vancouver Airport, Vancouver, Canada	Alex Zahara, Andrew Jackson, Ben Browder, Colin Cunningham, Dan Payne, Dan Shea, David Blue, David DeLuise, David Nykl, David Read, Douglas Arthurs, Eric Breker, Erick Avari, Garry Chalk, Garwin Sanford, Gary Jones, Herbert Duncanson, Jacqueline Samuda, Jay Brazeau, Jeffrey Vaughn, Jill Teed, Mark Haynes, Martin Wood, Mika McKinnon, Mike Dopud, Patrick Currie, Paul McGillion, Peter Flemming, Peter Williams, Robert Murray Duncan, Sabine Bauer, Simone Bailly, Steve Bacic, Teryl Rothery, The Companion, Tom McBeath, Valerie Halverson
