= Radek Zelenka =

Fictional character of a scientist in the television series Stargate Atlantis

- Stargate Atlantis character
- First appearance: "Thirty-Eight Minutes"
- Last appearance: "Enemy at the Gate"
- Portrayed by: David Nykl

In-universe information
- Occupation: Scientist
- Nationality: Czech

Dr. Radek Zelenka is a fictional character of a scientist in the 2004 television series Stargate Atlantis, portrayed by David Nykl. He is a member of the original expedition from Earth to the Ancient city of Atlantis in the Pegasus galaxy, which he joined after turning down a job at Masaryk University in his home country Czech Republic. His expertise on Ancient technology is only surpassed by Dr. Rodney McKay, with whom he shares a friendly rivalry. Zelenka's planned one-time appearance in the season 1 episode "Thirty-Eight Minutes" was followed by a recurring role for expository scenes with McKay and the leader of the expedition. Zelenka has since appeared in approximately half of each season's episodes and also appeared in the crossover episode "The Pegasus Project" of Stargate SG-1. The series finale of Atlantis, "Enemy at the Gate", marks his last appearance. For his portrayal of Radek Zelenka, David Nykl was nominated for a 2005 Leo Award in the category "Dramatic Series: Best Supporting Performance by a Male".

== Role in Stargate ==
Dr. Radek Zelenka is a careful and precise scientist of the original Atlantis Expedition who often supplements the scientific decisions of the "equally brainy" Dr. Rodney McKay, with whom he has a friendly rivalry. He frequently appears in the control room with McKay and the leader of the Atlantis expedition for expository scenes to lay out an episode's premise to the audience, and is "a key player in helping the Atlantis team stay one step ahead of the bad guys as well as solving some of its most perplexing scientific conundrums". GateWorld's David Read felt that while Zelenka may "play second fiddle to Rodney", he is also "the only one who even has the potential to put McKay down." Actor David Nykl explained that Zelenka has "reasonably well honed social skills" and "can put up with a lot of stress [...] and a lot of pressure, particularly from McKay and the situations that he can get into", but he may be too focused and determined to get one thing done.

Zelenka recurs in all five seasons of Stargate Atlantis and is also among the Atlantis characters to appear in the Stargate SG-1 crossover episode "The Pegasus Project". In his first appearance in the early Atlantis season 1 episode "Thirty-Eight Minutes", Zelenka helps devise a plan to free Major Sheppard's team including Dr. McKay from a potentially lethal technical problem. After a first short collaboration in "Suspicion", Zelenka and McKay are the driving forces in finding a solution to protect the city of Atlantis from a massive hurricane in "The Storm".

"Hot Zone" reveals that Zelenka has been given the ATA gene therapy to enable him to operate Ancient technology, but the therapy had no effect on him. Season 2's "Duet" shows Zelenka off-world for the first time, where he needs to save McKay and a soldier from being captured in a Wraith dart. Following a major dispute about an experimental Ancient power generator in "Trinity", McKay apologizes to Zelenka when the experiment causes the death of a scientist. McKay saves Zelenka from certain death in "Tao of Rodney" and later apologizes for so often putting him down, admitting that Zelenka is "a brilliant scientist and a decent human being". Zelenka last appears in the series finale of Atlantis, "Enemy at the Gate", where he implements a wormhole drive that sends the city of Atlantis from the Pegasus Galaxy to Earth within seconds.

== Conceptual history ==
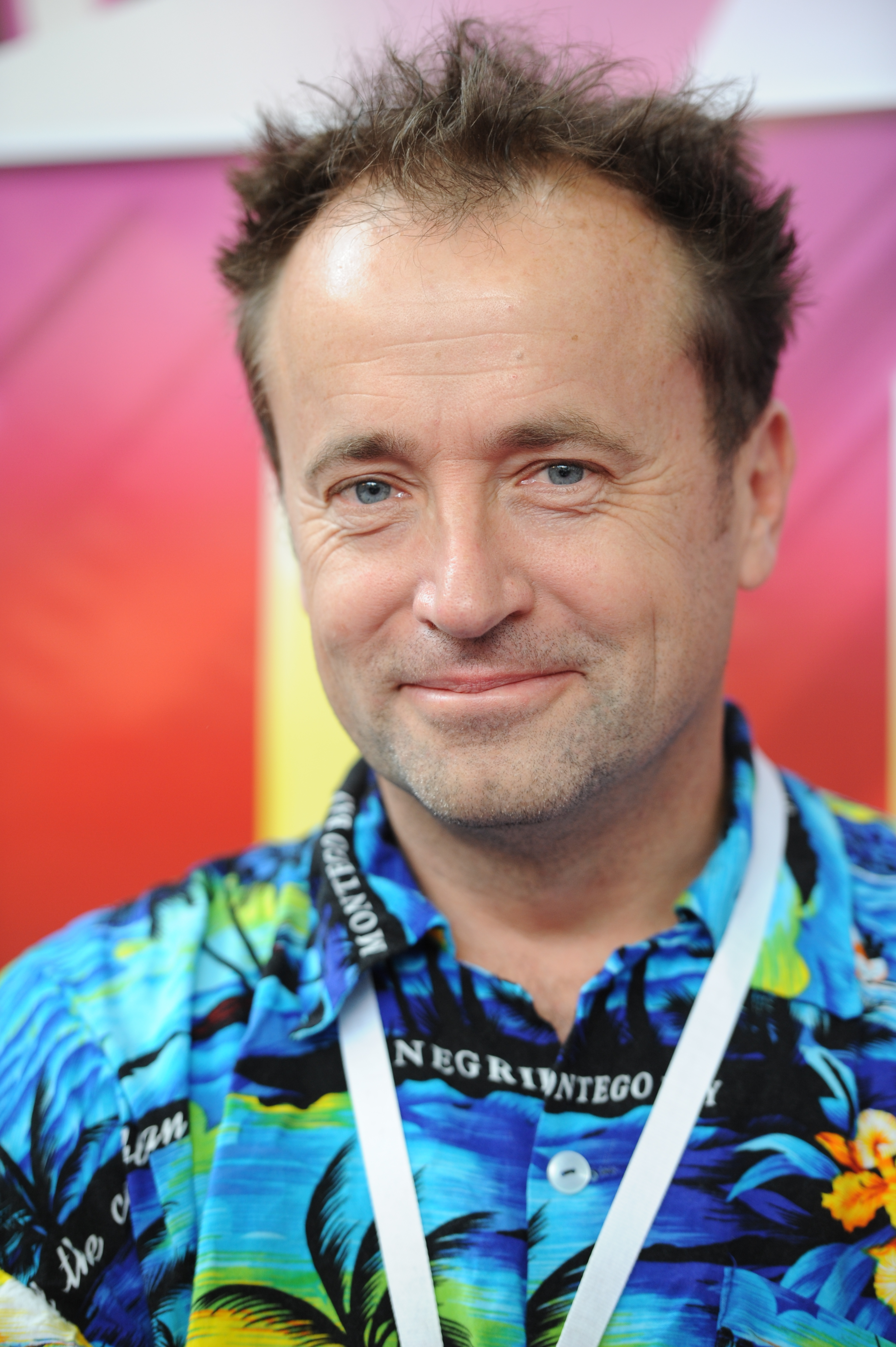
David Nykl in 2012

From the beginning of Stargate Atlantis, the producers were looking for actors to play non-Americans to present the cooperation between different nations and other groups of people in an alien environment. In fact, although in the series it is possible to see soldiers and technicians wearing in their uniforms flags that identify them as Russians, Japanese, South Africans, Belgians, Germans, Britons, Spaniards, etc, all main and secondary characters of earthly origin, except Zelenka, are from the Anglosphere: Americans, a Canadian and a Scotsman.

When actor David Nykl mentioned his Czech Canadian background during his audition for a Russian character for the season 1 episode "Thirty-Eight Minutes", the producers changed the character's nationality to Czech and cast him. Nykl made such an impression that producer Brad Wright wrote Zelenka into the Rodney McKay (David Hewlett) scenes of the next episode, "Suspicion".

Zelenka was re-introduced in the mid-season-1 finale "The Storm", Martin Gero's second Atlantis episode. Gero had had difficulty with laying out the dangers of the storm and its solution in a quick and entertaining manner with just the McKay character, and Brad Wright was not opposed to introducing another expository character. Zelenka has since frequently appeared for expository scenes in the control room with McKay and the leader of the Atlantis expedition. Zelenka's given name is first mentioned by McKay in the season 1 finale "The Siege"; McKay had previously been unable to remember Zelenka's name. The producers chose "Radek", a fairly common Czech given name, without input from Nykl. When Colonel Samantha Carter (Amanda Tapping) replaced Dr. Elizabeth Weir (Torri Higginson) as the leader of the Atlantis expedition in season 4, the producers shifted the emphasis of Zelenka's collaboration with McKay to his interaction with Carter. By the end of the show's run, the interactions between Zelenka and McKay become more subtle to the point where they finish each other's sentences and need fewer words and expressions to get by.

Portraying a recurring character, David Nykl was not under contract and neither knew his number of episodes nor his character's story arc in advance. Nevertheless, he appeared in approximately half of each season's episodes. No scenes with Zelenka were cut in the first two seasons of Atlantis, and extra scenes involving Zelenka were shot in the first episodes of the season 3 to fill time. However, all of David Nykl's scenes were cut from the season 5 episode "The Shrine" due to time constraints, although Nykl's credits appear in the finished episode.

Since Zelenka's first appearance, David Nykl's fluent Czech was worked into Stargate Atlantis as part of Zelenka. Approximately half of Zelenka's Czech lines were scripted (in English), which Nykl then translated verbatim. The other half was ad-libbed and usually included swearing. His usual Czech exclamations include Ty vole and Do prdele. Nykl normally speaks with a Canadian accent, but Zelenka had a thick Czech accent; Nykl found it increasingly hard to remember to put on the accent as the show went on. The late season 1 episode "Letters from Pegasus" features a minute-long non-subtitled monologue in which Zelenka describes the city of Atlantis in his mothertongue. Nykl translated the scripted monologue at home and performed it in Czech the next day. A version in English was initially planned to be filmed but was dropped after Nykl's successful first take. The end of Zelenka's video message ("drž se miláčku" - "take care, darling") was ad-libbed, but Nykl left it to the writers to create Zelenka's backstory. But during the show's run, Zelenka only ever mentions having a brother, a sister, and a nephew, and is never shown to be or have been in a romantic relationship.

== Reception ==
Often informing his superiors of critical situations, Zelenka earned the nickname "Mr. Bad News" among fans. In an interview with David Nykl, TheScifiWorld's Gilles Nuytens referred to Zelenka as a "popular" and "interesting" character, and compared Zelenka's appearances in Atlantis to those of the Stargate SG-1 character Walter Harriman, "a bit like the icing on the cake". Another interviewer mentioned that, following a "warm reception", the "fans have really taken [Zelenka] to heart". When GateWorld hypothesized that viewers were looking forward to an episode where the "underdog" Zelenka saves the day instead of McKay, Nykl replied that the set-up dynamic earns the character more sympathy from the audience. For his portrayal of Radek Zelenka, David Nykl was nominated for a 2005 Leo Award in the category "Dramatic Series: Best Supporting Performance by a Male".
