= Darkness (Stargate Universe) =

- Stargate Universe episode
- Episode no.: Season 1 Episode 4
- Directed by: Peter DeLuise
- Written by: Brad Wright
- Production code: 104
- Original air date: October 18, 2009

Guest appearances
- Lou Diamond Phillips as David Telford; Ming-Na as Camile Wray; Julia Benson as Vanessa James; Jeffrey Bowyer-Chapman as Darren Becker; Haig Sutherland as Hunter Riley; Jennifer Spence as Lisa Park; Peter Kelamis as Adam Brody; Mark Burgess as Jeremy Franklin; Patrick Gilmore as Dale Volker

Episode chronology
| ← Previous "Air" | Next → "Light" |

"Darkness" is the fourth episode of military science fiction television series Stargate Universe, and is the first part of a two-part story. The episode originally aired on October 16, 2009 on Syfy in the United States, followed by being aired in the United Kingdom and Ireland on October 20. The episode was directed by Peter DeLuise, who had previously directed episodes of both Stargate SG-1 and Stargate Atlantis. However, he had not worked on the Stargate franchise for the previous two years. The episode was written by Brad Wright who co-wrote the pilot episode.

In the episode, the crew have to deal with a loss of power, which deactivates every system except for life support and basic emergency lighting in a few sections. The episode was watched by nearly 2.1 million viewers. Most of the episode was shot on-set at The Bridge Studios, with a few scenes shot off-set for Young's visit with his wife.

== Plot ==
As everyone settles in aboard the Destiny, Colonel Young (Louis Ferreira) begins arranging meetings with the crew to work on various supply issues, and to give everyone something to do. Interspersed throughout the episode, Eli Wallace (David Blue) uses a Kino to record short video messages from the crew in case they don't survive.

Meanwhile, Nicholas Rush (Robert Carlyle) is busy trying to keep the ship running, while sleep deprivation combined with nicotine and caffeine withdrawal make him increasingly short-tempered. Young tries to have someone assist Rush to get an idea of what Rush is doing, but Rush angrily dismisses help. As Young comes in to check himself, Destiny shuts down, leaving only life support systems active. An increasingly frantic Rush explains that Young's attempt to dial back to Earth in "Air" and the crew's haphazard attempts to access the ship's systems drained most of the ship's already low power reserves, and that power cannot be restored. He eventually suffers a nervous breakdown and collapses.

Young uses the communication stones to contact Earth while everyone else works on the problem. David Telford (Lou Diamond Phillips) switches places with him, and is dismayed at Young's apparent mishandling of the situation, seeking to have him replaced. Young returns after speaking with his wife, cutting Telford off in the middle of an attempt to relieve Young of duty.

The crew then learn that the ship dropped out of faster-than-light travel just outside a system with several potentially habitable planets, and has plotted a course that will use a nearby gas giant to slingshot itself deeper into the system. The episode ends with Rush's and Lieutenant Scott's (Brian J. Smith) realization that the Destiny is on course to fly into the star.

== Production ==
The episode was originally titled "Fire" and was a single stand alone episode, however producers decided to make it into a two-part episode as the original story took it 20 minutes over the episodes time frame. The episode was shot at both The Bridge Studios on stages 2 and 4 (Destiny set), whilst the Earth scenes were shot out of studio and feature Ona Grauer as Emily Young, Everett Young's wife.

== Reception ==
"Darkness" gathered a total of 2.099 million live viewers, making it the second most-watched program on Syfy, behind Ghost Hunters. The episode dropped 14% from previous episode, "Air (Part 3)". On Sky1 in the United Kingdom the episode was watched by 635 thousand viewers in total.

Rob Vaux of Mania.com reacted negatively towards the episode, saying "Universe emphasizes the struggle to survive out in the depths of space, but ship breakdowns and unexpected course corrections into the heart of a sun are already wearing out their welcome". Carl England of Den of Geek was far more positive, praising the visual effects and writing his desire to see the conclusion; "I am highly impressed with this week's installment, and am impatiently awaiting the arrival of episode five, which should, hopefully, prove to be as remarkable as this week's, if not more so". IGN's Ramsey Isler said the series started to feel like "crisis of the week show that oftentimes lacks any real sense of urgency". Negative towards writing of the episode, Isler said "This could have possibly been a chance to inject a little horror-style storytelling into the series, but instead we get nothing more than constant bickering mixed with some very depressed characters and slow pacing". The episode was given 7.4 out of 10. Jane Boursaw from TV Squad was positive towards the episode, saying it reminded her of the now canceled American science fiction series, Firefly.
