= Gary Jones (actor) =

British-born Canadian actor (born 1958)

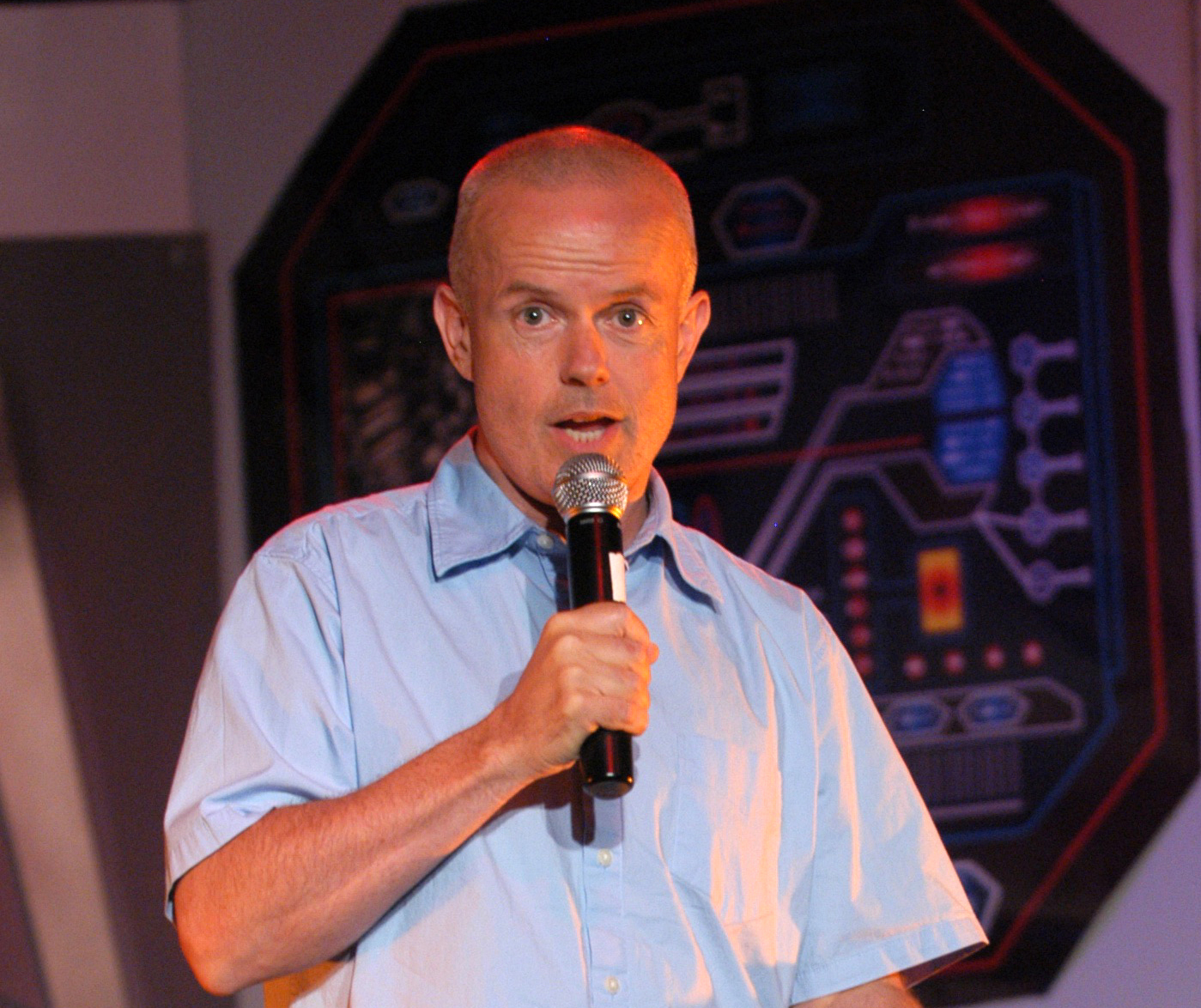
- Jones at Gatecon, in 2005
- Born: 4 January 1958 (age 68); Swansea, Wales, U.K.
- Years active: 1987–Present

Gary Jones (born 4 January 1958) is a Welsh-born Canadian actor.

== Life and career ==
Jones has worked on television and on stage both in his native United Kingdom and Canada. He is known for his recurring role as the stargate technician CMSgt. Walter Harriman in Stargate SG-1 and Stargate Atlantis. He has also made guest appearances on such shows as: Sliders, Cold Squad, The Outer Limits, Andromeda and Dead Like Me.

Gary Jones was a member of the improv group "Mission Improvable", which had a comedy special, before his role on Stargate SG-1. He joined Toronto's Second City Improv Company in the mid-1980s.

In 1986, with Second City he went to Vancouver for Expo 86, where they performed for six months at the Expo's Flying Club. After the Expo was finished, Jones stayed in Vancouver and started his acting career with guest appearances in TV shows, such as Wiseguy, Airwolf and Danger Bay. He was also a player of the Vancouver TheatreSports League.

Gary Jones is known not only for acting on screen and stage, but also for hosting events, including several Leo Awards galas and the BCSS Emerald Eve gala, as well as appearances on CBC Radio's The Debaters.

== Filmography ==
Year	Title	Role	Notes
1987	Danger Bay	Video Director	"Aquarium Rock"
1987	Airwolf	Davis	"Rogue Warrior"
1989	Wiseguy	'Shadow'	"Sins of the Father" "Heir to the Throne"
1990	Booker	Reporter	"Crazy"
1990	21 Jump Street	Reporter / Mr. Roberts	"Hi Mother" "Rounding Third"
1990	Glory Days	Unknown	"The Kids Are Allright" "Tammy Tell Me True"
1990	The Adventures of the Black Stallion	Veterinarian	"The Big Fix"
1990–1991	G.I. Joe	Various Voices	19 episodes
1991	Bingo	Prison Guard	
1991	Palace Guard	William Lemay	"Pilot"
1992	The Commish	Audi Owner	"Guns and Sons"
1992	Highlander: The Series	Klein	"Bad Day in Building A"
1993	When a Stranger Calls Back	X-Ray Technician	
1993	The Substitute	Elliott	
1993	Double, Double, Toil and Trouble	Bernard Brewster	
1994	Intersection	Unknown	
1994	This Can't Be Love	Carriage Driver	
1994	Birdland	Unknown	"Sons and Mudders"
1994	Andre	Lance Tindall	
1994	Sleeping with Strangers	Loan Officer	
1995	The Marshal	Accountant	"Rainbow Comix"
1995	Ebbie	Floor Manager	
1995–1996	The Outer Limits	TV Host / Duncan	"If These Walls Could Talk" "A Stitch in Time"
1996	Homeward Bound II: Lost in San Francisco	Baggage Handler	
1995–1996	Sliders	Michael Hurley	3 episodes
1996	Highlander: The Series	Hotel Guest	"The End of Innocence"
1997	The 6th Man	Gertz	
1997	The Sentinel	Mr. Jones	"Vendetta"
1997	Angels in the Endzone	Attendant	
1997	Doomsday Rock	Gil Naspeth	
1997–2007	Stargate SG-1	Walter Harriman	108 episodes
1998	Poltergeist: The Legacy	Ed Barker	"The Internment"
1999	The Net	Poker Player	"Pay the Line"
2000	Trixie	Lobbyist	
2001	Big Sound	Agent	"A Little Bit of the Old Ultraviolet"
2001	Head Over Heels	Bernie	
2002	Da Vinci's Inquest	Dr. Ludlow	"Gather Up All the Little People"
2002	The Santa Clause 2	Teacher	
2003	Cold Squad	Bill	"Bob & Carol & Len & Ali"
2003	Dead Like Me	Chuck	"Reaping Havoc"
2003	The Delicate Art of Parking	Murray Schwartz	
2004	Snakehead Terror	Colin Jenkins	
2004	Andromeda	Woody	"Abridging the Devil's Divide"
2004–2009	Stargate Atlantis	Walter Harriman	12 episodes
2004	Connie and Carla	Bartender	
2005	The L Word	Eric Beener	"Loneliest Number"
2005	Young Blades	Roger Bellchant	"The Girl from Upper Gaborski"
2006	Dr. Dolittle 3	Principal	
2007	Painkiller Jane	Dr. Erich Saunders	"Trial by Fire"
2008	Stargate: The Ark of Truth	Walter Harriman	
2008	Stargate: Continuum	Walter Harriman	
2009	Stargate Universe	Walter Harriman	"Air"
2010	16 Wishes	Mr. Smith	
2010	Sanctuary	George	"The Bank Job"
2011	Supernatural	Sceptical Husband	"The Mentalists"
2015	Dead Rising: Watchtower	Norton	"Dead Rising: Watchtower"
2016	Timeless	Vincent Sullivan	"Space Race"
2018	Travelers	Real Estate Agent	"Trevor"
2018	The Package	Dr. Trimble	
