= Chris Kramer (actor) =

Canadian actor (born 1975)

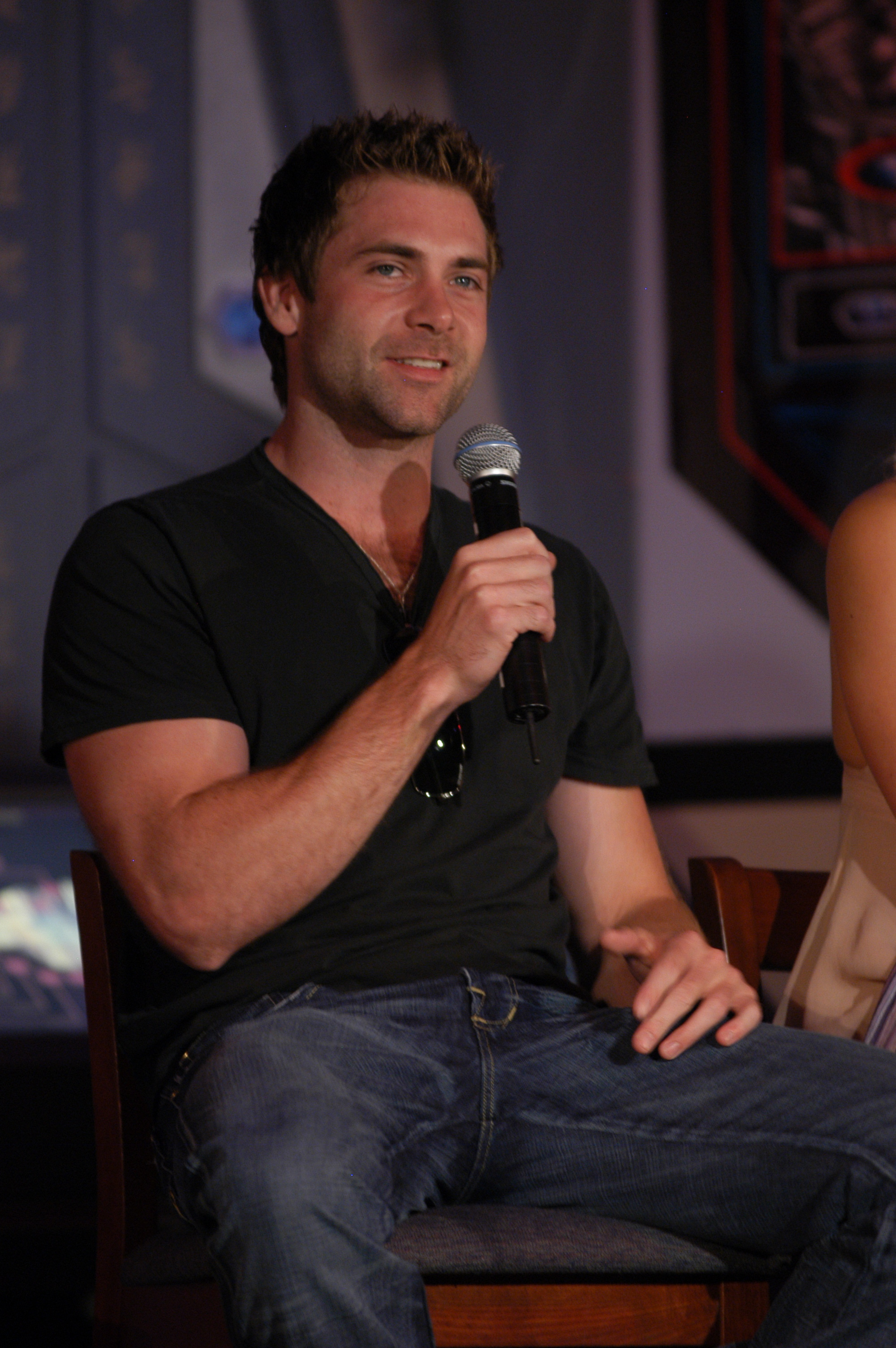
- Kramer at the 2005 Gatecon.
- Born: May 14, 1975 (age 49); Regina, Saskatchewan, Canada
- Occupation: Actor
- Years active: 2000–present

Chris Kramer (born May 14, 1975) is a Canadian actor. He is best known for the lead role of Morgan Pym in the Citytv television show The Collector.

== Biography ==
Kramer was born in Regina, Saskatchewan. He lived in different cities in Canada before settling in Calgary with his family. When he was 21, he dropped out of college and moved to Vancouver. As well as The Collector, he has appeared in 24, Saving Grace and Jericho.

He was nominated for a Leo Award for his role in The Collector in 2006. He has been nominated twice for Leo Awards and Monte Carlo Television Festival.

Kramer is a Roman Catholic.

== Television and films ==
- The Collector (2004-2006)
- 24
- Saving Grace
- Jericho
- Circle of Friends
- The Twilight Zone
- Stellina Blue (2008)
- Out of Control, Lifetime Network
- Rosary Stars: Praying the Gospel, DVD-only, Family Theater Productions
