= Aiden Ford =

Fictional character from Stargate Atlantis

- Rainbow Sun Francks as Aiden Ford
- First appearance: "Rising"
- Last appearance: "Search and Rescue"
- Portrayed by: Rainbow Sun Francks

In-universe information
- Species: Human
- Occupation: United States Marine Corps; First lieutenant
- Family: Grandparents
- Nationality: American

First Lieutenant Aiden Ford, USMC is a fictional character in the 2004 Canadian-American Sci-Fi Channel television series Stargate Atlantis, a military science fiction show about a combined civilian and military team exploring another galaxy via a network of alien transportation devices. Played by Rainbow Sun Francks, Aiden Ford is introduced as a main character in the season one premiere "Rising", holding the military rank of first lieutenant in the United States Marine Corps.

Ford is a regular in season one. He appears in a recurring role season two and appears once in a dream sequence in the season five premiere episode Search and Rescue. He later reappears in the official continuation novel Stargate Atlantis Legacy: The Third Path in which his ultimate fate is revealed.

== Television ==
Lieutenant Aiden Ford is introduced in the series premiere, "Rising", where he is stationed at the Antarctica outpost. Ford served in the Stargate Command (SGC) before and is twenty-five years old at the beginning of the first season. Ford served as John Sheppard's second-in-command after the events of "Rising" until a Wraith feeds upon Ford during a Wraith attack on Atlantis in season 2's "The Siege, Part 3". An exploding grenade blows them off a building into the ocean, and Ford's unconscious body and the still attached Wraith are recovered over an hour later. Ford survives after having an overdose of Wraith enzyme and later undergoes mental and physical changes. Ford develops a solid black left eye and becomes more aggressive and paranoid, fleeing Atlantis with a stolen Puddle Jumper.

Physical changes in Ford induced by the Wraith attack.

The Atlantis team encounters him again in "Runner" where they learn that Ford began killing Wraiths throughout the Pegasus galaxy to harvest their enzyme that gave him abnormal strength. Ford is presumed dead when he deliberately jumps into the culling beam of a Wraith dart, but the Atlantis team encounters him again in the mid-season 2-parter "The Lost Boys"/"The Hive". The Wraith-enzyme allowed Ford to awake immediately after rematerializing on board a Wraith-hive ship, from where he escaped only to build up a small strike force of young men following his suit by informing them about the benefits of the Wraith-enzyme. Ford asks the Atlantis team for help in destroying an entire Wraith Hive-ship, but the mission fails and forces Sheppard to leave Ford behind on an about-to-explode hive ship. Ford is only seen again in Sheppard's dream in the season 5 episode "Search and Rescue".

== Literature ==
Ford reappears in the official novel continuation Stargate Atlantis Legacy: The Third Path. To their surprise, the team finds Ford alive and with a group of nomadic humans known as the Travelers. He explains to Sheppard he managed to escape the hive ship before it was destroyed, but crashed on the planet over which the battle took place. With the help of the Travelers, he recovered from his addiction but it took so long that he could no longer find Atlantis afterwards. Ford began leading a guerilla campaign against the Wraith, aided by the Travelers. He also now has a wife and son and regrets his previous actions under the Wraith enzyme. At the end of the novel, Ford is safely returned to Earth with his wife and son and reunites with his cousin and grandparents.

== Conceptual history ==
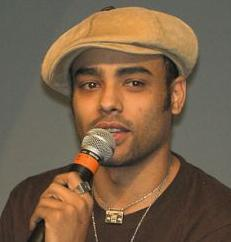
Rainbow Sun Francks at Wolf Pegasus One, London, 2006

After the end of season 1, the series producers, and the actor himself, felt that Ford had not worked as intended and was highly underused as a result. Unwilling to write him out, the writers came up with an idea to make the character more important, but that downgraded him to a recurring character. Producer Joseph Mallozzi said in 2009 that "We can assume [Ford] went down [...] with the ship" in "The Hive". Rainbow Sun Francks was disappointed about the evolution of his character, saying Ford did not evolve a backstory which the other characters did. Although Francks called the situation "tough", he reacted positively towards the development of character during the second season.

After announcing that Ronon Dex would become a main character in the Atlantis series, they followed up with another announcement saying that they had reduced Ford to a recurring character in the series. Many fans were disappointed with this new development because many felt he didn't have time to "prove" himself in the new series and that the character was never fully developed compared to the other characters in the show. Many campaigns to save the character were created after the announcement, the most notable being the F.O.R.D. campaign. Francks said that the change was not a "blow", since he and Brad Wright had already discussed the change. He was also more positive in the change of story arc for the character, saying he was a "big part" of the second season compared to season one where they hadn't had enough episodes to broaden the character. When asked about reducing Francks' role in Atlantis, Wright replied "The change in status means that Francks will not appear in every episode, and will not be listed in the show's opening credits."

== Reception ==
Fans of the character set up campaigns to get Ford back as a main character later in season two or season three. They sent various petitions to the producers, cast and crew of Stargate Atlantis to change their minds. Fans of the character even put up a website under the name F.O.R.D., which in turn was also the name for one of the campaigns fighting for the revival of the character.
