= Bruce Woloshyn =

Visual effects artist

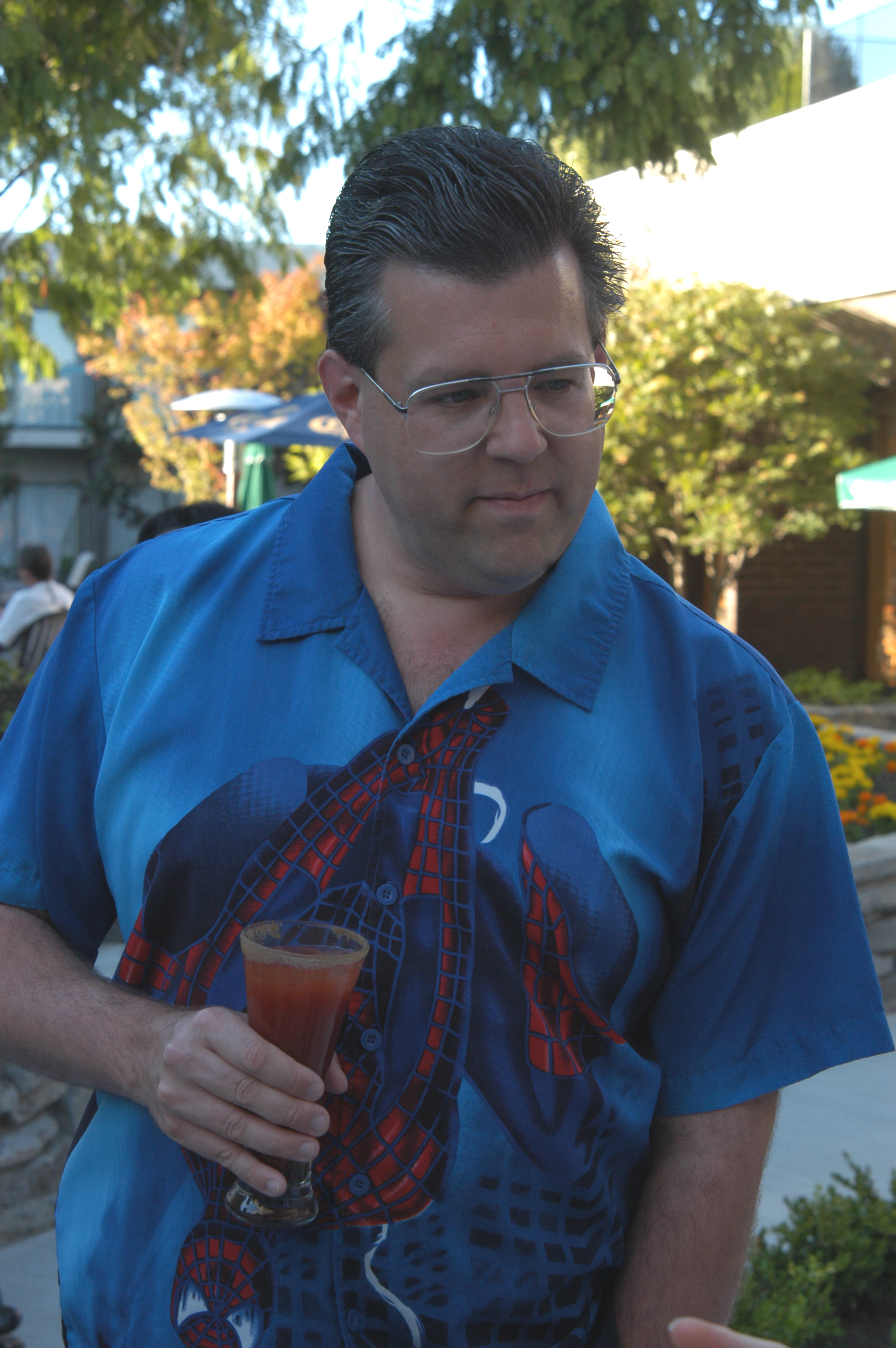
Bruce Woloshyn at Gatecon

Bruce Gerald Woloshyn (born March 22, 1964 in North Battleford, Saskatchewan), son of Gerry & Phyllis Woloshyn. He is a digital effects artist and supervisor.

== Television credits ==
His visual effects television credits include

- Andromeda
- Dark Angel
- The Guard
- Highlander: The Series
- Millennium
- The Outer Limits (1995 TV series)
- The pilot to Smallville
- Stargate Atlantis
- Stargate SG-1

== Film credits ==
His feature film credits include

- Abraham Lincoln: Vampire Hunter
- Antitrust
- G.I. Joe: Retaliation
- Into the Storm
- Invictus
- Let's Be Cops
- The Lizzie McGuire Movie
- Man on a Ledge
- Metallica Through the Never
- Mission to Mars
- Night at the Museum
- Power Rangers
- Ratchet & Clank
- Red 2
- RoboCop
- San Andreas
- 28 Weeks Later
- 3000 Miles to Graceland
- The Judge
- Trick 'r Treat
- The Twilight Saga: Breaking Dawn – Part 1
- The Twilight Saga: Breaking Dawn – Part 2
- The Uninvited
- Vacation (2015 film)
