= The Siege (Stargate Atlantis) =

- Stargate Atlantis episodes
- A Wraith attack on Atlantis
- Episode nos.: Season 1-2; Episodes 19-21
- Directed by: Martin Wood
- Written by: Martin Gero, Joseph Mallozzi and Paul Mullie
- Original air dates: March 18, 2005 (P. 1); March 25, 2005 (P. 2); July 15, 2005 (P. 3)
- Running time: 43min (each episode); 129min (put together)

Guest appearances
- Paul McGillion as Dr. Carson Beckett; Dean Marshall as Sergeant Bates; David Nykl as Radek Zelenka; Craig Veroni as Peter Grodin; Clayton Landey as Colonel Dillion Everett; Chris Britton as Prenum; James Lafazanos as Bob the Wraith; Mitch Pileggi as Steven Caldwell; Ellie Harvie as Dr. Lindsey Novak; Kirby Morrow as Captain Dave Kleinman; Heather Doerksen as Bridge Pilot; Trevor Devall as Hermiod (voice); Rainbow Sun Francks as Aiden Ford

Episode chronology
← Previous "The Gift"	Next → "The Intruder"

"The Siege" is the season finale for season one and season premiere for season two of the military science fiction television series Stargate Atlantis, and the nineteenth, twentieth and twenty-first episode of the series overall. The episodes were written by executive producers Joseph Mallozzi and Paul Mullie (part two) and Martin Gero (part one and three), and all three were directed by Martin Wood. The episodes were one of the series strongest in season 1 on Nielsen ratings and part three gathered the strongest rating with "Instinct" in season 2. The episode got strong reviews from major media publishers worldwide.

Part three introduced several cast changes for the season, including the departure of Aiden Ford (Rainbow Sun Francks) and the inclusion of Dr. Carson Beckett (Paul McGillion) and Steven Caldwell (Mitch Pileggi) to the main and recurring cast. "The Siege" is about the Wraith laying a siege on Atlantis and the Atlantis expedition's re-contact with Earth.

== Plot ==
=== Part 1 ===
While the Wraith come closer to Atlantis, the leading group of the expedition is informed by Rodney McKay and Radek Zelenka that the Wraith will pass the last Lantean defence satellite; they are very confident they can bring it back online and obliterate all three Hive Ships before they even reach Atlantis. McKay volunteers for the mission to power it up, entering the airless, weightless environment with a Naqahdah generator tethered to him, with it bobbing about like a helium balloon on the end of a string in an atmosphere within a gravity well. Meanwhile, Elizabeth Weir, John Sheppard, his team, and Bates search for a new Alpha site. Weir is informed by Zelenka that the self-destruct of the city wouldn't destroy enough of the city to prevent the Wraith from tracing them back to Earth. He shows Weir a simulation which predicts that the Wraith will be able to recover some of the City's technology, and some of the database. After an attack by darts on Atlantis and subsequent unexplained faults, it is suspected that one Wraith has infiltrated outlying parts. With a biometric sensor they are able to locate the Wraith and they try to capture him. However, the Wraith is able to fend off Sheppard's team until he is stunned by Aiden Ford. The Wraith is imprisoned and Sheppard starts to interrogate him after he named him Bob, but he keeps silent.

Meanwhile, the Wraith Hive-Ships drop out of hyperspace as predicted, and Grodin powers up the satellite. McKay watches from the cloaked Puddle Jumper as the energy beam from the weapon successfully slices through and destroys one Hive-ship. Amid the celebration, Grodin radios that he is having trouble - McKay's rerouting has overloaded and the weapon can't be fired again. Grodin cannot bring it back online, and as McKay orders the pilot to rescue him, the remaining Hive Ships destroy the satellite, killing Grodin. McKay can't do anything, thus he informs Weir and is ordered to return to Atlantis. Weir informs the base about what has happened and afterwards starts the self-destruct countdown. Having heard the evacuation order, Bob tells them no matter where they go, no matter where they hide, the Wraith will find them, as well as Earth.

=== Part 2 ===
Rodney McKay returns to Atlantis, where Elizabeth Weir orders the self-destruct activation. As they attempt to dial the Alpha site, the gate is suddenly activated; a wormhole was established from Earth. Much to everyone's amazement, a company of marines come through and Weir and the others are greeted by Colonel Dillion Everett who instantly takes over command. Everett informs him that the Daedalus will arrive in four days with a Zero Point Module (ZPM).

In the conference room Everett informs the others about their plan, but Weir is only allowed to join after Sheppard insists. Later Everett meets Sheppard in the holographic archive and Sheppard grimly plays the history of the Pegasus Galaxy. Contemplating strategies, Sheppard suggests that they remotely control the Puddle Jumpers using the Chair and fly them, cloaked, into the hive ships armed with an explosive; he believes they should ask the Genii to use their nuclear weapons. At Atlantis the test-run of Sheppard's plan is a success, McKay and Zelenka start to install the completed weapons into the Puddle Jumpers. Meanwhile, several men are taken out by the Wraith and the wounded are taken to the Alpha site.

As Weir cannot stop him, Sheppard rushes to the Puddle Jumper bay and takes it up. Outside, as Aiden Ford's team attempt to repel the Darts, a group of Wraith materialises in front of them. Someone lets off a grenade, and Ford and a Wraith are catapulted into the ocean. Inside, Everett's team is overrun and he is cornered by a Wraith. Out of ammo, the alien begins to feed off him.

=== Part 3 ===
John Sheppard’s efforts to pilot a Puddle Jumper with a nuke on board to destroy a Wraith hive ship result in success, but he does not die. The Daedalus arrives and rescues Sheppard by the means of Asgard teleportation, and later uses the same technology both to deliver the Zero Point Module to Atlantis and to deploy another nuclear bomb onto the third and final hive ship, destroying it. First Lieutenant Aiden Ford becomes paranoid after realizing the Atlantis team is afraid of him because he has been injected with the Wraith enzyme and escapes through the Stargate in one of the Puddle Jumpers. It is discovered that twelve more hive ships are on their way to Atlantis. Daedalus attempts to intercept them, destroying two ships in the process, but is forced to retreat after the Wraith activate countermeasures which make it impossible to teleport nukes onto them. The Wraith then begin bombarding Atlantis again. A plan is made to beam a nuke directly above the city and then cloak the city, to make the Wraith think that Atlantis self-destructed. This plan works, and the Wraith fleet leaves.

== Production ==
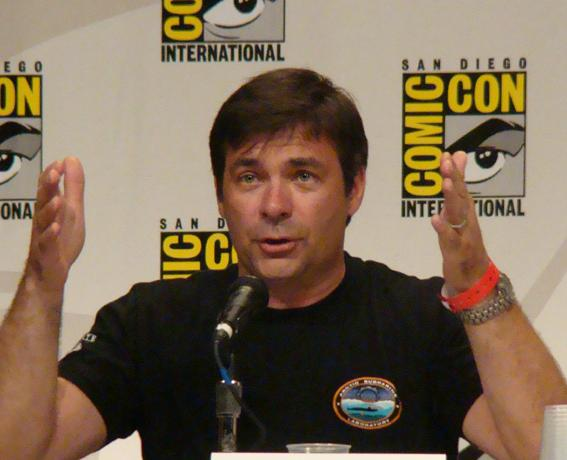
Director Martin Wood at Comic Con in 2007.

The first plot information about "The Siege, Part 2" was released in November, 2004. In the original script, Colonel Dillion Everett was supposed to be a recurring character in the series future along with his two United States Marine Corps officers Major Ferrell and Captain Radner, the announcement also suggested the involvement of Dr. Radek Zelenka. All of the characters, with the exception of Zelenka were killed off in "The Siege, Part 2". Another announcement later on in January, 2005 did not include any references to Dillion and his two marines.

A deleted scene from part two showed Sora being returned to the Genii as part of their deal for the nuclear weapons, but this was cut due to time constraints. Being cut, it is unclear if the event occurred or if Sora may still be being held. This is the first appearance of the Daedalus class battlecruiser, specifically the first ship of the class, the Daedalus itself . It was first mentioned in the Stargate SG-1 episode "Moebius", which also included a brief image of its schematics. This is also the first episode in which the full given name for Radek Zelenka is revealed. The producers chose "Radek", a fairly common Czech given name, without input from portraying actor David Nykl. At the end of season 1, Rainbow Sun Francks (portrayed Aiden Ford) was disappointed about the evolution of his character, he then asked the producer if they could expand him somehow. The producers agreed and reduced Ford's status to a recurring role so that his story arc would be more important to the "whole" story arc of season 2.

When talking about part 3, Martin Gero called it the "biggest episode" they had done. When developing part three of "The Siege", Brad Wright and Gero handed over a copy of the script to director Martin Wood. As Wood has commented, his job was to make it "come to life in a way" that was more "exciting" than previous part. He called the episodes, a "Roller-coaster ride" because of the "Loops" and "Twists". In the last scene, where John Sheppard is stalking Aiden Ford, the portraying actors Joe Flanigan and Francks complained about their characters getting "Off a little easy." They eventually came to a compromise with the producers, since the last scene was "Really" important to the story arc of "Runner".

According to writer-producer Gero, Carson Beckett was set to appear in only a handful of episodes after the Stargate Atlantis' pilot episode, "Rising", but the character had such a big connection to the fans that Gero labeled McGillion the "breakout star" in Stargate Atlantis. The producers decided to give Beckett a larger role and made him a recurring character with a total of fifteen episode appearances in the first season, followed by a regular in season two.

== Reception ==
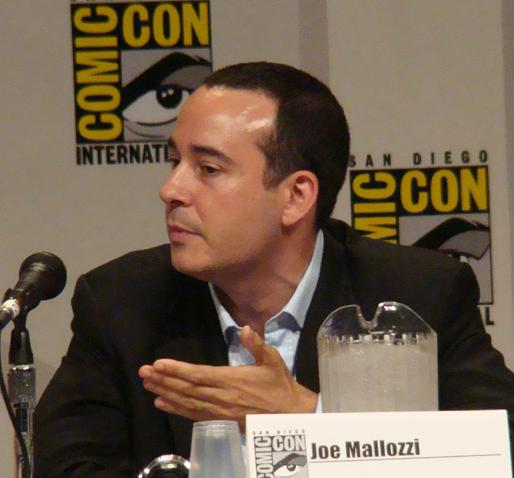
Joseph Mallozzi at Comic Con, 2007

"The Siege, Part 1" earned a household rating of 2.5, both "The Siege, Part 2" and "The Siege, Part 3" earned a household rating of 2.2. Part one and three got a GateWorld rating of three out of four, part two got three and half out of four. "The Siege, Part 3" topped the household rating scale in the summer of 2005. "The Siege, Part 3" was also given a syndication rating of 1.1. "The Siege, Part 1" and "Part 2" debuted on the Canadian broadcasting agency, The Movie Network on January 24 and January 31, 2005. "Part 1" debuted on March 18, 2005 on the Sci Fi Channel in the United States. Part 3 of "The Siege" premiered on British channel Sky1 on October 19 at 8 p.m. The third part was viewed by 680,000 in the United Kingdom. Along with the season premiere of sister show Stargate SG-1's episode "Avalon", Stargate Atlantis's premiere episode of season two, "The Siege, Part 3", failed to attract many viewers, holding the average viewership rating it held in the previous season of Stargate Atlantis. While the show was not a success, together with Battlestar Galactica and Stargate SG-1, it made the Sci Fi Channel the top rated cable network in the United States for the 18–49 and 25–54 demographics. Stargate Atlantis had a higher household rating than Stargate SG-1, but a lower one than Battlestar Galactica.
