= The Collector (Canadian TV series) =

Canadian television series

- Created by: Jon Cooksey; Ali Marie Matheson
- Starring: Chris Kramer; Jodelle Ferland; Ellen Dubin; Aidan Drummond; Carly Pope; Sonya Salomaa; Christine Chatelain
- Country of origin: Canada
- No. of seasons: 3
- No. of episodes: 40

Production
- Executive producers: Jon Cooksey; Ali Marie Matheson; Larry Sugar
- Producers: J.B. Sugar; Judith Csernai
- Running time: approx. 44 minutes
- Production company: No Equal Entertainment

Original release
- Network: Citytv; Space
- Release: June 2, 2004 – April 4, 2006

The Collector is a Canadian supernatural drama television series about a man attempting to help save people who have bargained their souls with the devil. The series is set in Vancouver, British Columbia, Canada, where it was also filmed. CHUM cancelled the program after three seasons.

== Premise ==
After over 600 years of "collecting" the souls of people at the end of their 10-year deals, Morgan Pym (Chris Kramer) negotiates with the devil for the ability to aid the damned in redeeming themselves rather than sending them to Hell. Under the devil's mocking gaze, Morgan assists his "clients" in undoing the damage their deals have done because of the devil shifting good luck towards the client and away from others.

== Characters ==
- Morgan Pym (Chris Kramer) is a collector of souls damned by their deal with the devil. He was a fourteenth-century German monk who fell in love with a woman named Katrina, breaking his vows. She began to show symptoms of the plague and Morgan sold his soul for her to be cured. The devil cured her for 10 years, the length of all his contracts. When an angry Morgan confronts him, the devil claims he didn't cheat on the deal because "You wanted more time with her and I gave you that. You never said she had to outlive you." In return for being spared from Hell, Morgan becomes the first collector. More recently, the devil agreed to allow him to seek redemption for his clients. Morgan has 48 hours to help redeem each client or they are sent to Hell, and the time remaining is displayed on his cell phone.
- Jeri Slate (Ellen Dubin) is a reporter who regularly encounters Morgan Pym in her investigations and is professionally obsessed with him, as he always seems to be "around" for certain controversial incidents and/or high-profile deaths. But as she digs deeper and gets closer to the truth, she begins to sense a prior, unknown influence of Pym in her own life—which renders the obsession increasingly personal.
- Gabriel Slate (Aidan Drummond) is the son of investigative reporter Jeri Slate. Gabriel, addressed as Gabe in the series, is an autistic child who is somehow connected to Morgan Pym and is regularly visited by the devil. Some of Gabe's actions influence the stories and he displays an amazing perception of Morgan's experiences. His connection to Morgan is explored progressively throughout the series.
- Maya Kandinski (Carly Pope in season 1; Sonya Salomaa in seasons 2–3) used to be a normal child until her father started sexually abusing her at a young age. Eventually she ran away from home and took to the streets of Vancouver, where she became a heroin addict, prostituting herself for the money to buy the drug, and eventually contracted AIDS, which she was dying from when Morgan met her. The first client Morgan tried to save cured her AIDS by inflicting it upon himself, with the devil's help. Morgan befriends her and helps her with her addiction. It is his meeting with her that makes Morgan decide to make his proposal to The devil. She bears a great deal of resemblance to Morgan's lost love.
- Taylor Slate (Christine Chatelain, seasons 2–3) is Jeri's younger sister. She's sweet and smart, but when introduced, seemingly ill-suited for long term responsibility, as she isn't able to hold a job well or reliably for very long. But this "freedom" in her schedule lets Jeri call on her to look after Gabe when Jeri's out pursuing a story. Taylor's aptitude for responsibility is unexpectedly tested, however, when the burden of Gabe's care and upbringing suddenly and unavoidably becomes hers.
- The devil is portrayed by usually portrayed by Jodelle Ferland. To identify him (or her) to the viewer, his eyes appear to fill with fire at times. Gabe is the only person besides Morgan who sees through his disguises. He makes deals with people, granting them whatever they wish, in exchange for their souls in ten years. To do this, he manipulates luck, shifting good luck away from others and towards the client. Therefore, it can be said that nothing The devil does is truly good, as every action usually has a greater than or equal to negative result or consequence. In the last 48 hours of a deal, the devil begins to undo the effects of the deal on his client (for example in "The Prosecutor" the client starts losing cases and it is revealed his winning streak was at the expense of innocent people). The devil's collector will normally approach the client at the 48-hour mark to inform them that they can elect to go to Hell early. The devil states that either the client gives up and goes to Hell early, or the devil enjoys watching the client squirm for their last hours on Earth, before he takes them to Hell. In both cases, he 'wins'. In the first episode, the devil agrees to Morgan's deal, to give souls the chance to redeem themselves during this 48 hour time. He claimed one of the reasons for doing this is that it would make the affair more "sporting". While mocking Morgan's quest and hindering Morgan's efforts, he honors the agreement with Morgan, letting the soul go if it attains redemption.

== Series elements ==
=== Vow of secrecy ===
Morgan and his clients are bound never to reveal the true nature of their situation to anyone else. Revealing the truth to an innocent results in both parties being sent to Hell.

=== The portal ===
When a damned soul is about to be sent to Hell, a portal opens up beside them, and the soul is ripped out of the body and sucked into the portal, leaving only the dead body behind. Only a collector and the devil's clients are able to see this portal. For people who happen to be nearby, the taking of a soul is witnessed as an accident or some other fatal event. Later, it is revealed that the portal can be seen by any person who sold their soul, as a preview of what will happen when their time on Earth is up.

== Episodes ==
=== Season 1 (2004) ===
The first thirteen episodes of The Collector, which aired in the summer of 2004 on Space: The Imagination Station and in the fall of 2004 on Citytv.

No. overall	No. in season	Title	Directed by	Written by	Original release date
1	1	"The Rapper"	Holly Dale	Jon Cooksey & Ali Marie Matheson	June 2, 2004
After 650 years of being a collector for Satan, Morgan Pym decides to try to bring redemption for those who had sold their souls. His first client is a rapper whose fame is the result of his pact with the devil.
2	2	"The Prosecutor"	George Mendeluk	Jon Cooksey & Ali Marie Matheson	June 9, 2004
Successful prosecutor Carter Baine's life is turned upside down when all the cases he won for the past decade start getting overturned. Of course, as Morgan tells him, he didn't ask to make sure the actual guilty parties paid.
3	3	"The Supermodel"	John Pozer	Jon Cooksey & Ali Marie Matheson	June 16, 2004
Morgan's latest client is fashion model Nicki Schillenberg, who sold her soul to lose weight. Nicki's arrogant, vain, selfish, and rude behavior, however, indicates it wasn't the body that was ugly.
4	4	"The Ice Skater"	Michael Robison	Susin Nielsen	June 23, 2004
5	5	"The Photographer"	Holly Dale	Jeanne Heal	June 30, 2004
Morgan's new client is Stuart Sanderson, a photographer at the vancouver star who sold his soul to take extraordinary crime photo's.
6	6	"The Actuary"	Holly Dale	Frank Borg	July 7, 2004
Morgan's newest client is statistician Barrett Gimbal who's been using his devil given powers to help the mafia rub out competition.
7	7	"The Roboticist"	Michael Robison	Barbara Covington	July 14, 2004
8	8	"The Medium"	Holly Dale	Jon Cooksey & Ali Marie Matheson	July 21, 2004
9	9	"The Old Man"	Michael Robison	Jon Cooksey & Ali Marie Matheson	July 28, 2004
10	10	"The Children's Book Writer"	Brad Turner	Jon Cooksey & Ali Marie Matheson	August 4, 2004
11	11	"The Yogi"	George Mendeluk	Stacey Kaser	August 11, 2004
Morgan's client is a Hindu yogi who sold his soul to achieve enlightenment and pass it on to others. Morgan first has to convince the man that the devil and his deal are real and then find out where all the bad luck has gone.
12	12	"The Miniaturist"	George Mendeluk	Jon Cooksey & Ali Marie Matheson	August 18, 2004
13	13	"Another Collector"	Michael Robison	Will Dixon	August 25, 2004
Morgan works alongside a collector from Montreal to track down her latest client; a surgeon who traded his soul for the abilities of a psychic healer.

=== Season 2 (2005) ===
No. overall	No. in season	Title	Directed by	Written by	Original release date
14	1	"The Cowboy"	Larry Sugar	Rick Drew	January 9, 2005
15	2	"The UFOlogist"	Bruce McDonald	Catherine Girczyc	January 16, 2005
Morgan’s latest client is a UFO nut who sold his soul for proof of the existence of aliens.
16	3	"The Dreamer"	Michael Robison	Jeanne Heal	January 23, 2005
17	4	"The Pharmacist"	Bruce McDonald	Stacey Kaser	January 30, 2005
18	5	"The Tattoo Artist"	Michael Robison	Jon Cooksey & Ali Marie Matheson	February 6, 2005
19	6	"The Comic"	Holly Dale	Richard Side & Gary Jones	February 13, 2005
A comedian sold his soul to be the most successful comic in the world. But the joke's on him when his forty-eight hours are almost up.
20	7	"The Campaign Manager"	Anthony Atkins	Frank Borg	February 20, 2005
Morgan's next client is the campaign manager of an up-and-coming politician, who wants to hinder his plans to help the poor for her own reasons.
21	8	"The Mother"	Holly Dale	Jon Cooksey & Ali Marie Matheson	February 27, 2005
Morgan's next client is the campaign manager of an up-and-coming politician, who wants to hinder his plans to help the poor for her own reasons.
22	9	"The Tour Guide"	J.B. Sugar	Jon Cooksey & Ali Marie Matheson	March 6, 2005
23	10	"The Superhero"	Michael Robison	Christina Ray	March 13, 2005
Ten years ago, a man sold his soul for super powers, only to have great tragedy come with great power. Now his forty-eight hours are almost up, and Morgan must help him.
24	11	"The Ripper"	Larry Sugar	Jon Cooksey & Ali Marie Matheson	March 20, 2005
In a flashback episode, Morgan is informed that his next client is none other than Jack the Ripper. But Morgan may be surprised when he finds out the infamous killer's identity.
25	12	"The Historian"	J.B. Sugar	Jon Cooksey & Ali Marie Matheson	March 27, 2005
26	13	"Beginnings"	J.B. Sugar	Jon Cooksey & Ali Marie Matheson	April 3, 2005
This episode takes place straight after "1348 AD". Morgan gets to grip with being the first collector and his first ever client; a widower who sold his soul for a good time. We also see how Morgan's tormented by memories of him and Katrina, and how the devil nearly snuffed out Morgan's humanity completely.
27	14	"1348 AD"	Holly Dale	Richard Side & Gary Jones	September 1, 2005
(season 1 episode not aired in original run according to TV.com)

=== Season 3 (2006) ===
No. overall	No. in season	Title	Directed by	Written by	Original release date
28	1	"The Jockey"	Anthony Atkins	Frank Borg	January 10, 2006
29	2	"The Chef"	Holly Dale	Susin Nielsen, Ali Marie Matheson & Jon Cooksey	January 17, 2006
30	3	"The Customer Service Rep"	J.B. Sugar	Christina Ray	January 24, 2006
31	4	"The Vampire"	Jonathan A. Rosenbaum	Catherine Girczyc	January 31, 2006
32	5	"The Video Jockey"	Holly Dale	Mark Leiren-Young	February 7, 2006
33	6	"The Farmer"	J.B. Sugar	Jon Cooksey & Ali Marie Matheson	February 14, 2006
34	7	"The Junkie"	Holly Dale	Christina Ray	February 21, 2006
Maya's brother comes down to go with Maya and Morgan to see Maya get her one month chip. They also meet Maya's sponsor who turn's out to be Morgan's next client. Will Maya finally discover Morgan's secret?
35	8	"The Watchmaker"	Unknown	Jon Cooksey & Ali Marie Matheson	February 28, 2006
36	9	"The Person With AIDS"	J.B. Sugar	Jon Cooksey & Ali Marie Matheson	March 7, 2006
37	10	"The Media Baron"	Unknown	Christina Ray	March 14, 2006
38	11	"The Spy"	J.B. Sugar	Jon Cooksey & Ali Marie Matheson	March 21, 2006
Morgan is given permission to trail his next client to Eastern Europe; a spy who sold her soul to complete her mission. Morgan ends up tangled up in Espionage in the process.
39	12	"The Alchemist"	J.B. Sugar	Jon Cooksey & Ali Marie Matheson	March 28, 2006
40	13	"The Exorcist"	Unknown	Jon Cooksey & Ali Marie Matheson	April 4, 2006

== Home media ==
Morningstar Entertainment has released the first two seasons on DVD in Canada. Knightscove now owns the rights. Many of the released DVD sets of both season 1 and season 2 are defective. After a great deal of digging through multiple defective copies, people at Knightscove were able to find a few good copies to replace defective ones.

DVD name	Episodes	Box set release dates		
DVD name	Episodes	Region 1	Region 2	Region 4
The Complete Season 1	14	November 4, 2008		
Complete Second Season	13	May 26, 2009		
