= Stargate Atlantis season 2 =

Stargate Atlantis
- Season 2
- DVD cover
- No. of episodes: 20

Release
- Original network: Sci Fi Channel
- Original release: July 15, 2005 – January 30, 2006

Season chronology
- ← Previous; Season 1 Next → Season 3

The second season of the television series Stargate Atlantis commenced airing on the Sci Fi Channel in the United States on July 15, 2005, concluded on The Movie Network in Canada on January 30, 2006, and contained 20 episodes. The show itself is a spin off of its sister show, Stargate SG-1. The series was developed by Brad Wright and Robert C. Cooper, who also served as executive producers. Season two regular cast members include Joe Flanigan, Torri Higginson, Rachel Luttrell, Jason Momoa, with Paul McGillion, and David Hewlett as Dr. Rodney McKay. The second season focuses on the Atlantis Expedition continuing to make the Wraith think that the city self-destructed (The Siege Part III) while continuing to explore Pegasus and hunt for ZPMs (although they do have one now), this means at times lying to new allies about the city even sometimes claiming to be a small contingent that escaped the Siege; the season also marks the first time the Expedition is able to make contact with Earth although doing so uses a lot of power so the contact is oftentimes via the Daedalus, an intergalactic Earth-Asgard vessel commanded by Col. Steven Caldwell who makes clear his desire to be Military Leader of Atlantis but eventually settles for a sort of advisory role as it becomes clear that Dr. Weir and the Lt. Col Sheppard are a duo not to be messed with. The central plot of the second season is the development of Dr. Beckett's retrovirus, which can, theoretically, turn a Wraith into a human. Also, Ronon Dex joins the mission.

The one-hour premiere, "The Siege Part III", aired on July 15, 2005. The theme song for the series received an Emmy nomination in the category "Outstanding Music Composition for a Series (Original Dramatic Score)". The series was developed by Brad Wright and Robert C. Cooper, who also served as executive producers. Season two regular cast members include Joe Flanigan, Torri Higginson, Rainbow Sun Francks, Rachel Luttrell, Jason Momoa and David Hewlett.

== Cast ==
- Starring Joe Flanigan as Major/Lt. Colonel John Sheppard
- Torri Higginson as Dr. Elizabeth Weir
- Rachel Luttrell as Teyla Emmagan
- Rainbow Sun Francks as First Lieutenant Aiden Ford
- Jason Momoa as Ronon Dex
- With Paul McGillion as Dr. Carson Beckett
- And David Hewlett as Dr. Rodney McKay

== Episodes ==
Episodes in bold are continuous episodes, where the story spans over 2 or more episodes.

No. overall	No. in season	Title	Directed by	Written by	Original release date
21	1	"**The Siege Part III**"	Martin Wood	Martin Gero	July 15, 2005
The timely arrival of the Daedalus, led by Col. Steven Caldwell, saves Maj. Sheppard's life from a suicide bombing run. Atlantis wins the first round against the Wraith and therefore think they are safe for the moment, but then discover that many more hive ships are on their way to Atlantis. Thankfully, with the new ZPM, McKay might pull off another miracle.
22	2	"The Intruder"	Peter DeLuise	Joseph Mallozzi & Paul Mullie	July 22, 2005
Strange malfunctions begin to occur when newly promoted Lt. Col. Sheppard along with other members of the expedition return from a trip to Earth aboard the Daedalus. When things go too far, they discover that the ship has been infected by a Wraith virus, and now it has the instinct to stay alive, even if it has to kill in order to survive. Meanwhile, periodic flashbacks reveal the events of their visit to Earth including a meeting with Ford's cousin.
23	3	"Runner"	Martin Wood	Robert C. Cooper	July 29, 2005
Following a lead on the whereabouts of Lt. Ford, Lt. Col. Sheppard and Teyla get captured on P3M-736 by Ronon Dex, a man who they find out is a runner, hunted by the Wraith. When they offer to help, the team must face off against their old ally, and in the process possibly gain a new one.
24	4	"Duet"	Peter DeLuise	Martin Gero	August 5, 2005
On the planet Thenora after the team witnesses the aftermath of a culling, a Wraith Dart suddenly appears, beaming Dr. McKay and marine officer Laura Cadman aboard. After shooting the dart down to preserve Atlantis' secret, the team discovers that Cadman's consciousness is trapped inside McKay's body.
25	5	"Condemned"	Peter DeLuise	Story by : Sean Carley; Teleplay by : Carl Binder	August 12, 2005
Sheppard's team stumbles upon a technologically advanced society, the Olesians, who purposely leave their criminals in a penal colony near the Stargate, so that the Wraith may discover them first. But after the prisoners shoot the jumper down, the team discovers that this punishment is too effective and the crime rate had plummeted, forcing the Olesians to start sentencing petty criminals and innocent people to the Wraith.
26	6	"Trinity"	Martin Wood	Damian Kindler	August 19, 2005
After having found an experimental Ancient power generator, McKay becomes obsessed with triumphing where the Ancients failed, but the price may be too high. Elsewhere, Teyla and Ronon travel to the planet Belkan to trade, but discover that not all of Ronon's people died.
27	7	"**Instinct**"	Andy Mikita	Treena Hancock & Melissa R. Byer	August 26, 2005
While investigating a planet, the team comes across a Wraith girl who survived a Wraith ship crash years ago and has been raised by a human man in secret, hiding from the people of the nearby village in fear of her life. But she doesn't consider the consequences when she takes an incomplete drug of Dr. Beckett's to turn herself human. Also, another Wraith who survived the crash is killing villagers.
28	8	"**Conversion**"	Brad Turner	Story by : Robert C. Cooper & Martin Gero; Teleplay by : Martin Gero	September 9, 2005
After Sheppard is injected with the Wraith retro-virus, the Atlantis team races against time to find a way to reverse his transformation into an Iratus bug hybrid. But even though he might make it difficult for them, he could be the key to his own salvation.
29	9	"Aurora"	Martin Wood	Story by : Carl Binder & Brad Wright; Teleplay by : Carl Binder	September 23, 2005
The team finds an Ancient warship still inhabited by Ancients in suspended animation. They are all connected together through a virtual environment, that Sheppard enters to communicate with them. The only problem being, the Ancients think that their virtual lives are reality and they have an unexpected enemy in their midst.
30	10	"**The Lost Boys**"	Brad Turner	Martin Gero	September 23, 2005
Sheppard's team is kidnapped off-world, only to find that their captor is none other than Aiden Ford. He has recruited several men into taking the Wraith enzyme, and now they intend to use the team to destroy a Hive Ship to prove the "glorious" effects of the drug.
31	11	"**The Hive**"	Martin Wood	Carl Binder	January 6, 2006
After the attempt to destroy the Hive backfires, the team is captured by the Wraith and Sheppard finds himself up against the Wraith Queen who is demanding answers. Meanwhile, Dr. McKay takes a massive dose of the Wraith enzyme and escapes to Atlantis in a state of frenzy, but his choice could put him on the edge of death.
32	12	"Epiphany"	Neil Fearnley	Story by : Joe Flanigan & Brad Wright; Teleplay by : Brad Wright	January 13, 2006
Sheppard gets pulled into an Ancient "sanctuary", separating him from the rest of his team and the outside world. While trying to get him out, the team discovers that time moves much more quickly where Sheppard is and he could die of old age before they release him.
33	13	"Critical Mass"	Andy Mikita	Story by : Brad Wright & Carl Binder; Teleplay by : Carl Binder	January 20, 2006
It is discovered that The Trust have infiltrated Atlantis and planted a bomb in the city, set to go off the next time they dial Earth. To add to the tension, two Wraith cruisers are on the way, and Dr. Weir wants to figure out if there could be a Goa'uld spy in Atlantis.
34	14	"Grace Under Pressure"	Martin Wood	Martin Gero	January 27, 2006
During the test run of a recently repaired puddle jumper, Captain Hugh Griffin is getting under Dr. McKay's skin by espousing various ideas about science history, including the myth of the flat Earth during Columbus' time. But the jumper crashes into the ocean and sinks slowly to the bottom. Eventually the pressure is too great for the windows and Griffin sacrifices himself to seal McKay into the rear compartment. When he shows the first signs of losing hope, he must rely on a hallucination of Lt. Col. Samantha Carter for his survival.
35	15	"The Tower"	Andy Mikita	Joseph Mallozzi & Paul Mullie	February 3, 2006
The team finds a world that possesses Ancient technology, but only the royal family may be allowed to operate it and lowly villagers are treated with little dignity. When he tries to set things right, Sheppard finds himself a pawn in the rivalry between the heirs to the throne.
36	16	"The Long Goodbye"	Andy Mikita	Damian Kindler	February 10, 2006
After recovering two alien stasis pods from space, the minds of the inhabitants are transferred into Dr. Weir and Sheppard. But when it's discovered that the two are in fact enemies hoping to settle an ancient score by killing each other once and for all, the entire population of Atlantis is put in danger.
37	17	"Coup d'État"	Martin Wood	Martin Gero	February 17, 2006
Ladon Radim comes to the expedition wanting to overthrow the Genii leader, Cowen. They are reluctant to help, but it seems he has discovered a ZPM that he could trade with the expedition. The Genii set a trap for the Atlantis team on a ruined planet, M6R-867, and Radim's true motives are revealed.
38	18	"Michael"	Martin Wood	Carl Binder	February 24, 2006
An amnesiac young Lieutenant in Atlantis, Michael Kenmore, suffers poor treatment from the personnel and disturbing nightmares that he is a Wraith, yet things become worse when he accidentally stumbles upon a shocking discovery about himself... he is one.
39	19	"Inferno"	Peter DeLuise	Carl Binder	March 3, 2006
The team comes to aid a low-level technological civilization, the Taranians, taking refuge throughout an Ancient outpost. While trying to repair systems, McKay discovers a supervolcano below the outpost that will obliterate life on the entire planet of Taranis, suggesting evacuation to a new planet. Yet during the evacuation process, the Stargate is swallowed up by the supervolcano.
40	20	"**Allies**"	Andy Mikita	Martin Gero	March 10, 2006
A Wraith faction (including Michael) contacts Atlantis to seek help in destroying their common enemies, the Wraith. Because the Wraith are currently engaged in a destructive civil war, they suggest using Atlantis' retro-virus to turn their native foes into human prey.

== Production ==
"Runner" is the last episode where Rainbow Sun Francks (portrayed Aiden Ford) is credited as a regular cast member. Jason Momoa joins the main cast in this episode. While rehearsing scenes for "Duet" where Cadman has control of McKay's body, Jamie Ray Newman would do a scene first, and then David Hewlett would try to mimic her movements, cadence, accent, etc. Alan C. Peterson, who played the Magistrate in "Condemned", previously played Canon in Stargate SG-1s Demons. The episode title of "Trinity" is a reference to the Trinity test. The outdoors parts of "Instinct" were filmed on location at Lynn Valley Canyon, North Vancouver. Jewel Staite, who played Kaylee Frye on the cult Sci-Fi show Firefly, is the second Firefly cast member to guest star on a Stargate series, the first being Adam Baldwin in Stargate SG-1 episode "Heroes". She would later go on to play Dr. Keller as a recurring guest star at the end of Season 3, continuing into Season 4 prior to becoming a series regular in season 5.

"Conversion" was actress Rachel Luttrell's first on-screen kissing scene. Her parents were present for the kiss. Every scene in "Aurora" where Ronon appears in the environmental suit had to be played by a body double because Jason Momoa's head would not fit in the helmet. The title of "The Long Goodbye" is an homage to Raymond Chandler's 1954 novel The Long Goodbye. "Coup D'état" was supposed to feature the return of Acastus Kolya (last seen in "The Brotherhood"), but because of conflicts with Robert Davi's schedule it was rewritten to feature Kolya's second in command Ladon instead. For "Allies", Brent Stait took over the role of Michael throughout the episode. Conner provided the voice after the crew felt it 'needed' it.

== Release and reception ==
The strongest episodes on the Nielsen ratings were "The Siege" and "Instinct", "The Siege" was the only episode in the season that was able to get a syndication rating. The lowest rated episode in the season was "Michael". "The Hive" was nominated for a Gemini Award in the category "Best Sound in a Dramatic Series" in 2006. For "Grace Under Pressure", Joel Goldsmith was nominated for an Emmy in the category "Outstanding Music Composition for a Series (Original Dramatic Score)".

Don Houston from DVD Talk said that the second season did "rise to the occasion" and surpassed its sister show Stargate SG-1. ComingSoon reviewer Scott Chitwood said that it "should satisfy" viewers, but commented that it didn't have the same quality as Battlestar Galactica and gave the series 6 out of 10 and the DVD package 8 out of 10. June L. from Monsters and Critics (M&C) gave the season 4 out of 5 and said that it was a "pleasure to watch the stories", compared to other new science fiction shows which depends on blood and violence. Dan Heaton from Digitally Obsessed said that the season suffered an "identity crisis," but was throughout good and entertaining because of the good acting among others.

== DVD releases ==
DVD name	Region 1	Region 2	Region 4
Stargate Atlantis Season 2	March 6, 2007	February 26, 2007	November 8, 2006
Season 2: Volume 1	—	April 10, 2006	—
Season 2: Volume 2	—	May 8, 2006	—
Season 2: Volume 3	—	June 5, 2006	—
Season 2: Volume 4	—	July 3, 2006	—
Season 2: Volume 5	—	July 31, 2006	—
