= Peter Kelamis =

Australian actor

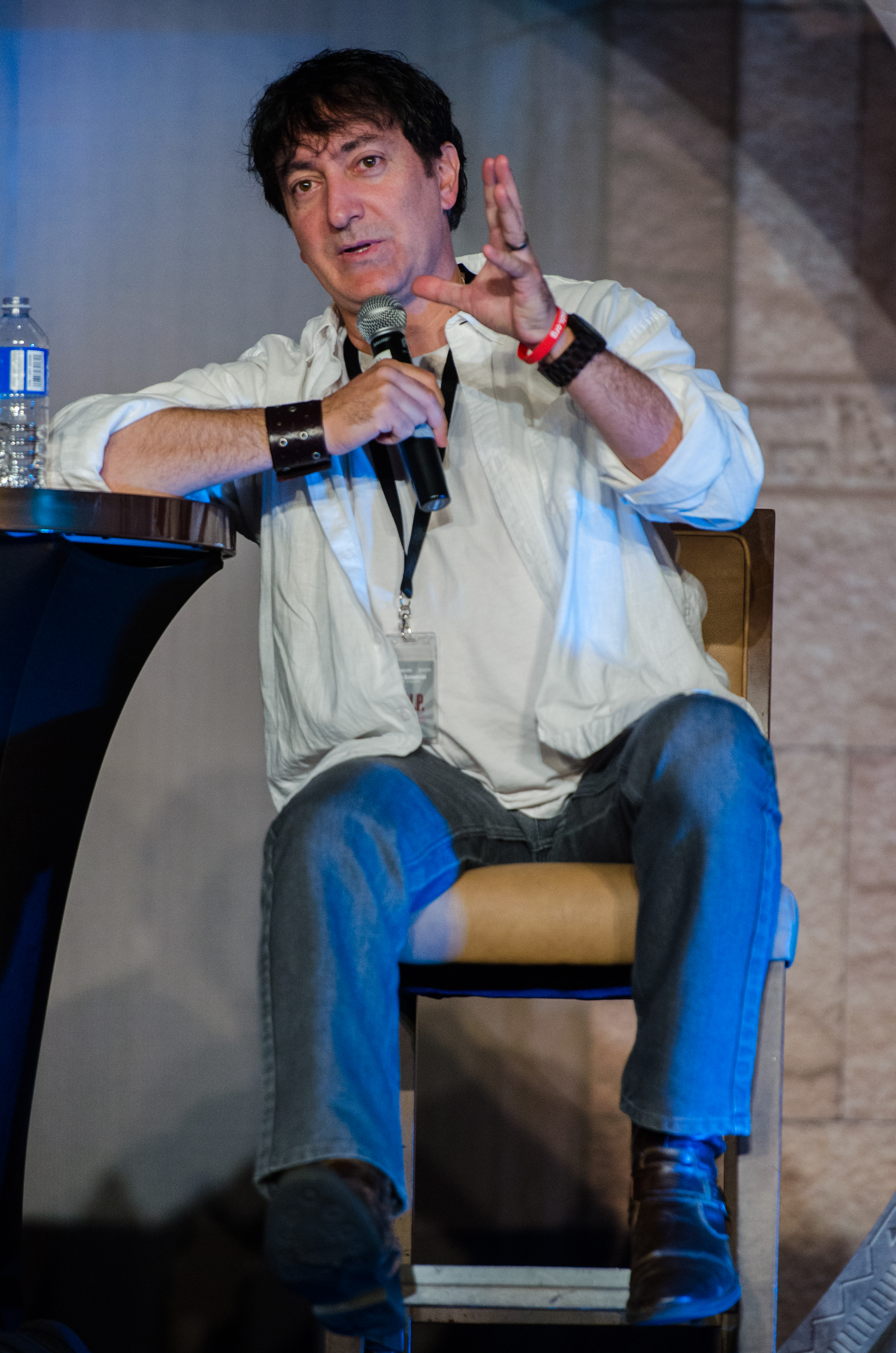
- Kelamis at Gatecon 2016
- Occupations: Actor; stand-up comedian; impressionist
- Years active: 1989–present
- Spouse: Alannah Stewartt (m. 2004)
- Children: 1

Peter Kelamis is an Australian actor and stand-up comedian. He is best known for voice roles including Goku in Ocean's English dub of the animated series Dragon Ball Z (succeeding Ian James Corlett and preceding Kirby Morrow), Rolf from Ed, Edd n Eddy, Tail Terrier in Krypto the Superdog, Dr. Adam Brody in Stargate Universe, and Wing Saber in Transformers: Cybertron, replacing the character's previous voice actor Colin Murdock.

== Career ==
Some of his appearances on television were in Eureka, The Outer Limits, Corner Gas, Sliders, Stargate SG-1, Stargate Universe, The Sentinel, NCIS and The X-Files. Film appearances include; Happy Gilmore, Fear of Flying, I'll Be Home for Christmas, Best in Show, The Sport Pages: The Heidi Bowl, and Everything's Gone Green. Kelamis also had a recurring role in Beggars and Choosers.

As a voice actor, he replaced Ian James Corlett as the voice of Goku during 1997 in FUNimation/Saban's short-lived original dub of Dragon Ball Z, and also voiced Goku in FUNimation and Pioneer's 1997-1998 dub of the Dragon Ball Z films Dead Zone, The World's Strongest, and The Tree of Might. During 2000, Kelamis reprised the role in an unrelated dub produced by Westwood Media and AB Groupe for the UK (and later Canada). He left in the middle of the Cell arc, with Kirby Morrow voicing Goku for the remainder of the production. Kelamis has since stated he would have continued voicing Goku for the rest of the series, but was under the impression that the dub was ending, when it was in fact merely on a temporary recording hiatus. He has also voiced Rolf in Ed, Edd n Eddy as well as Whiplash in Iron Man: Armored Adventures. Kelamis originally auditioned to play the Eds as well as the other male characters in Ed, Edd n Eddy but did not land either role. Instead, Kelamis was encouraged by voice director Terry Klassen to play the character of Rolf. He also voiced Reaper in the video game Devil Kings as well as provided the voice of Byrne in the CGI animation, Dreamkix.

Outside of acting, Kelamis also works as a stand-up comedian, he performed his first stand-up comedy act in the fourth grade. Kelamis made his first stand-up comedy appearance at the Punchlines Comedy Club in Gastown.

== Personal life ==
Kelamis is of Greek descent, and is Greek Orthodox Christian, having attended Saint George's Cathedral in Vancouver. In 2004, he married his second wife, Vancouver-born Canadian actress Alannah Stewartt. They have a child.

== Filmography ==
=== Live action ===
==== Film ====
List of acting performances in feature films
Year	Title	Role	Notes
1993	Sherlock Holmes Returns	Respiratory Therapist	
1994	Sleeping with Strangers	Photographer	
1995	Suspicious Agenda	Police Photographer	
1996	Happy Gilmore	Potter's Caddy	
1997	Jitters	Angelo	
1997	The Right Connections	Sales Guy	
1997	Bliss	Neighbor	
1998	Voyage of Terror	Purser Jennings	
1998	I'll Be Home for Christmas	Conway, Bus Driver	
1999	Can of Worms	Intergalactic Cop (voice)	
1999	Turbulence 2: Fear of Flying	Mazzo	
2000	Best in Show	Bartender	Scene deleted
2003	The Lizzie McGuire Movie	Dr. Comito	
2006	Dr. Dolittle 3	Rodeo Announcer	
2011	50/50	Phil	
2012	The Cabin in the Woods	Demo Guy #1	
2014	Big Eyes	Real Estate Guy	
2017	Killing Gunther	Rahmat	
2022	American Dreamer	Officer Burt	

==== Television ====
List of acting performances in television shows
Year	Title	Role	Notes
1991–1995	The Commish	Clerk, Bellman	2 episodes
1994	Hawkeye	Yves	Episode: "The Siege"
1994–1998	The X-Files	Assistant District Attorney Daniel Costa, Additional Roles	4 episodes
1995	Madison	Mr. Stand Up	Episode: "House of Cards"
1995	Sliders	Glenn	Episode: "The Weaker Sex"
1995–1996	Strange Luck	David Benton	2 episodes
1996	For Hope	Writer One	TV movie
1998	The Sentinel	Ed Warner	Episode: "Neighborhood Watch"
1998	The Net	Bobby	Episode: "Deleted"
1999	The Outer Limits	Brain Wakefield	Episode: "Joyride"
2002–2003	Stargate SG-1	Dr. Brent Langham, Coyle Boron	2 episodes
2002	Corner Gas	Bob Lang	Episode: "Comedy Night "
2002	The Twilight Zone	Lew Gallo	Episode: "Dead Man's Eyes"
2004	The L Word	Movie Type	Episode: "Pilot"
2009–2011	Stargate Universe	Dr. Adam Brody	39 episodes
2012	NCIS	Bruce Johnson	Episode: "Rekindled"
2016	When Calls the Heart	Tobias Pope	2 episodes
2017	IZombie	Mr. Huntsman	3 episodes
2017–2018	Beyond	The Man In The Yellow Jacket	17 episodes
2018	The Man in the High Castle	Richie	Episode: "Jahr Null"
2021	Riverdale	Samm Pansky	Recurring S5: 6 episodes, Guest S6: 1 episode

=== Voice roles ===
==== Film ====
List of voice performances in animated feature and direct-to-video films
Year	Title	Role	Notes
2001	Rudolph the Red-Nosed Reindeer and the Island of Misfit Toys	Foreman Elf	Television film
2001	Barbie in the Nutcracker	Pimm	Direct-to-video
2002	Barbie as Rapunzel	Otto, Skinny Swordsman	Direct-to-video
2002	G.I. Joe Spy Troops	Polly	Television film
2006	Barbie in the 12 Dancing Princesses	Brutus, Sentry #4	Direct-to-video
2008	Bratz Baby Save Christmas	Max, Dad	Direct-to-video
2009	Ed, Edd n Eddy's Big Picture Show	Rolf	Television film
2010	Barbie: A Fashion Fairytale	Spencer	Direct-to-video
2012	Barbie: The Princess & the Popstar	Seymour Crider	Direct-to-video
2013	Barbie & Her Sisters in A Pony Tale	Monsiur Philippe	Direct-to-video
2014	Barbie and the Secret Door	Sniff	Direct-to-video
2015	Barbie in Rock 'N Royals	Eddie	Direct-to-video
2015	Open Season: Scared Silly	Serge	Direct-to-video

==== Anime ====
List of dubbing performances in anime
Year	Title	Role	Notes
1997	Dragon Ball Z: Dead Zone	Goku	English dub - Pioneer/Geneon & FUNimation
1997–1998	Dragon Ball Z	Goku, Master Roshi	Episodes 38–53; English dub - FUNimation & Saban Entertainment
1998	Dragon Ball Z: The World's Strongest	Goku	English dub - Pioneer/Geneon & FUNimation
1998	Dragon Ball Z: The Tree of Might	Goku	English dub - Pioneer/Geneon & FUNimation
2000	Dragon Ball Z	Goku	Episodes 108–144; English dub - AB Groupe & Westwood Media
2000	Key the Metal Idol	Shuichi Tataki	English dub

==== Animation ====
List of voice performances in animated television shows
Year	Title	Role	Notes
1994–1996	Hurricanes	Additional voices	7 episodes
1995	The New Adventures of Madeline	Additional voices	Unknown episodes
1999	Roswell Conspiracies: Aliens, Myths and Legends	Simon 'Fitz' Fitzpatrick	41 episodes
1999–2009	Ed, Edd n Eddy	Rolf	46 episodes
2000–2001	Action Man	Ricky Singh-Baines	24 episodes
2000–2002	What About Mimi?	Herbert Finkle, Lodeman, Mr. Greely, Additional Voices	39 episodes
2002	Super Duper Sumos	Dr. Stinger	10 episodes
2003	Transformers: Go-Bots	Mototron	
2004–2007	ToddWorld	Pickle, Oswald The Puppy, Vark	39 episodes
2005	Transformers: Cybertron	Wing Saber	English dub
2005–2006	Krypto the Superdog	Tail Terrier, Bud	17 episodes
2006–2007	Class of the Titans	Granny Hercules, Old Timer, Orpheus, Melampus	10 episodes
2007	George of the Jungle	Cousin Larry	13 episodes
2007	Tom and Jerry Tales	TV Announcer	1 episode
2008	GeoTrax	Captain Jim	Episode: "Flying Lesson"
2008	Being Ian	Mr. Greebl eConductor, Pop Delivery Man, Ivan, Negative Team Leader, Todd, Kirk Cleftchin, Cuppie	2 episodes
2009	League of Super Evil	Magenta, Miss Johnson, Mysterio Villaino, Mr. Lee	4 episodes
2009	Iron Man: Armored Adventures	Whiplash, Marc Scarlotti	3 episodes
2010	Dreamkix	Byrne, Pierre Pierre, Gazelle Captain	11 episodes
2010	The Twisted Whiskers Show	Dine	10 episodes
2012	Action Dad	Shortcut, Prince Eyeball, H.Q. Voice, Alam Voice, Director, Computor	7 episodes
2013	Slugterra	Primo Pesto	Episode: "Slugball"
2015	Dr. Dimensionpants	Motho, Alien Referee	Episode: "Motho's Boy"
2015–2018	My Little Pony: Friendship Is Magic	Fashion Plate, Big Daddy McColt, Hooffield Pony, Vapor Trail's Dad	6 episodes
2016	Beat Bugs	Cockroach, Dr. Robot, Melvin, Uncle Wilbur	8 episodes
2017	Beat Bugs: All Together Now	Cockroach, Dr. Robot, Bug Magician	TV special
2018	The Hollow	Spider-Leader	Episode: "Cocoon"
2018	Polly Pocket	Mr. Yamamoto, Mr. Huffman, Mr. Quidnunc	Episode: "A Little Fright"
2018–2020	Corner Gas Animated	Announcer, Brandon, Clown, Cuban Man, Doctor, Farmer Lawson, Long-Arm Charlie, Shakespeare, Silvio, Strung Up Body, Surfer Dude, Vampire, Worker Bee	7 episodes
2019; 2023–2024	The Dragon Prince	Villads	8 episodes
2021	My Little Pony: Pony Life	Saddle Bags	Episode: "The Great Cowgirl Hat Robbery"
2023	Ninjago: Dragons Rising	Geo	1 episode

==== Video games ====
List of voice performances in video games
Year	Title	Role	Notes
2004	CSI: Miami	Ron Preston	
2005	Devil Kings	Akechi Mitsuhide, Reaper	
2005	Ed, Edd n Eddy: The Mis-Edventures	Rolf	
2013	Grand Theft Auto V	The Local Population	
2013	Disney Infinity	Randall Boggs	
2014	Disney Infinity: Marvel Super Heroes	Randall Boggs	
2015	Disney Infinity 3.0	Randall Boggs	
2023	Granblue Fantasy: Relink	Yodarha	English dub

== Awards and nominations ==
- 2004 - Video Premiere Award for Best Animated Character Performance - Nominated
- 2007 - Leo award for Best Screenwriting in a Music, Comedy, or Variety Program or Series - Won
