= Rainbow Sun Francks =

Canadian actor

- Francks in 2026
- Born: 3 December 1979 (age 46); Toronto, Ontario, Canada
- Other name: Rainbow Francks
- Occupation: Actor
- Years active: 1995–present
- Father: Don Francks
- Relatives: Cree Summer (sister)

Rainbow Sun Francks (born 3 December 1979) is a Canadian actor known for his role as Lt. Aiden Ford in the television show Stargate Atlantis, and his recurring roles on The Listener, The Umbrella Academy, and High Fidelity.

== Early life and family ==
Francks was born in Toronto, Ontario, Canada. He is the son of Canadian actor and musician Don Francks and Plains Cree-African-Canadian dancer Lili Red Eagle, who is originally from North Richmond, California. He is an adopted honorary member of the Red Pheasant Cree Nation, a First Nation of Canada. He is also the younger brother of Cree Summer.

== Career ==
Francks was an on-air personality at MuchMusic, a Canadian music video and variety television channel. He starred in Stargate Atlantis Season 1 as US Marine Lieutenant Aiden Ford. His role was reduced to that of a recurring character for Season 2, and was written out entirely for Season 3 and 4 (he made a brief cameo in a dream sequence in season 5). He played the role of Dev Clark on The Listener. He produces a hip hop group known as The Oddities.

== Filmography ==
=== Film ===
Year	Title	Role	Notes
1997	The Planet of Junior Brown	Buddy Clark	
1999	Johnny	Gus	
1999	One Heart Broken Into Song	Hank Johnson	
2000	Love Come Down	Julian	
2007	Aliens vs. Predator: Requiem	Earl	
2012	100 Musicians	Sydney	Short
2014	Pretend We're Kissing	Henri	
2015	The Steps	Dean	
2017	How to Fall	Quincy	Short
2019	Goliath	Adam	
2020	Age of Dysphoria	Wes	Short
2021	Trigger Point	Mouthpiece	
2022	Diaspora	Daniel	Short
2023	Suze	Carl	
TBA	Deer Hunting for Beginners	Cole / Bartender	Short

=== Television ===
Year	Title	Role	Notes
1995	Black Fox	Frank Johnson	TV miniseries
2000	Love Song	Calvin Dumas	TV film
2001	Twice in a Lifetime	Jimmy	episode: "Moonshine Over Harlem"
2004–2008	Stargate Atlantis	Aiden Ford	Main role (season 1), recurring (season 2), guest (season 5)
2006	Behind the Camera: The Unauthorized Story of Diff'rent Strokes	Dion Mial	TV film
2007	This Space for Rent	Barnaby Sharpe	episode: "Stain'd"
2010	The Bridge	Daniels	episode: "Never Let Me Down Again"
2011	Lost Girl	Cameron	episode: "Can't See the Fae-Rest"
2011–2014	The Listener	Dev Clark	Main role (season 2–5)
2013	Against the Wild	Charlie Foster	TV film
2013	Played	Orlando	episode: "Poison"
2013	State of Syn	Preacher	2 episodes
2014, 2016	Murdoch Mysteries	Sam Carr / Stanley Garrity	2 episodes
2015	Defiance	Uno	3 episodes
2016	Slasher	Wayne	Episode: "Ill-Gotten Gains"
2016	Eyewitness	Burlingame	Recurring role
2017	The Strain	Jason	Guest role (season 4)
2017	Rising Suns	Banfi	TV miniseries
2017	The Beaverton	Doctor	Episode: "2.4"
2017–2018	Upstairs Amy	Martin	TV series
2018	Imposters	Dr. Price	3 episodes
2019	The Umbrella Academy	Det. Chuck Beamen	Recurring role (season 1)
2019	Hudson & Rex	Jay Piper	Season 1/Episode 12: "A Cult Education"
2020	High Fidelity	Cameron Brooks	Recurring role
2020	A Christmas Exchange	Patrick	TV film
2021	My Favorite Christmas Melody	Travis	TV film
2022	Better Things	Copeland	Episode: "Jesus Saves"
2023	Daniel Spellbound	Burden	Voice role
2023	I Woke Up a Vampire	Bill Henley	Recurring role
2024, 2026	Brilliant Minds	Morris Allen	6 episodes
2024	My Dead Mom	Jay	Web series
2026	A Different World	Larry	2 episodes
