= Primetime Emmy Award for Outstanding Special Visual Effects =

Primetime Emmy Award

Primetime Emmy Award for Outstanding Special Visual Effects in a Season or a Movie
- Awarded for: Outstanding Special Visual Effects
- Country: United States
- Presented by: Academy of Television Arts & Sciences
- First award: 1955
- Currently held by: Stranger Things (2026)
- Website: http://www.emmys.com/

Primetime Emmy Award for Outstanding Special Visual Effects in a Single Episode
- Awarded for: Outstanding Special Visual Effects in a Single Episode
- Country: United States
- Presented by: Academy of Television Arts & Sciences
- First award: 2012
- Currently held by: Spider-Noir (2026)
- Website: http://www.emmys.com/

This is a list of the winning and nominated programs of the Primetime Emmy Award for Outstanding Special Visual Effects for a series, miniseries, film, or special. Since the award ceremony of 1998, the category has been divided into Special Visual Effects for a Series and Outstanding Special Visual Effects for a Miniseries, Movie or a Special. In 1991, the Television Academy nominated four programs, but did not determine a winner.

Before becoming well-known directors, Neill Blomkamp, Gareth Edwards, and Robert Stromberg were nominees for the award.

== Winners and nominations ==
indicates the winner

=== 1950s ===
Year	Program	Episode	Nominees	Network
1955
1955	Outstanding Engineering Effects			
1955	Four Quadrant Screen		Robert Shelby	NBC
1955	Electronic Editing		John Goetz, Walter O'Mears, Daniel Zampino	NBC
1955	The Jackie Gleason Show		Jackie Gleason Enterprises	CBS
1955	Space Patrol		Cameron Pierce	ABC

=== 1960s ===
Year	Program	Episode	Nominees	Network
1966
1966	Outstanding Special Electronic Effects (Note: As a juried award, nominees had to garner 50% approval to win the award. None of the nominees met the benchmark and no award was given.)			
1966	The Julie Andrews Hour		Milt Altman	NBC
1966	Outstanding Special Mechanical Effects			
1966	The Man from U.N.C.L.E.		Arnold Goode, Bill Graham, Bob Murdock	NBC
1966	Voyage to the Bottom of the Sea		Robert Tait	ABC
1966	Outstanding Special Photographic Effects			
1966	Voyage to the Bottom of the Sea		L. B. Abbott, Howard Lydecker	ABC
1966	Bonanza		Edward Ancona	NBC
1966	Lost in Space		L. B. Abbott, Howard Lydecker	CBS
1967
1967	Outstanding Special Mechanical Effects			
1967	Star Trek		Jim Rugg	NBC
1967	Voyage to the Bottom of the Sea		Robert Tait	ABC
1967	Outstanding Special Photographic Effects			
1967	The Time Tunnel		L. B. Abbott	ABC
1967	Star Trek		Darrell Anderson, Linwood G. Dunn, Joseph Westheimer	NBC
1967	Voyage to the Bottom of the Sea		L. B. Abbott	ABC
1968
1968	Outstanding Special Classification of Individual Achievements			
1968	Star Trek	"Metamorphosis"	The Westheimer Company	NBC
1969
1969	Outstanding Special Photographic Effects			
1969	Star Trek	"The Tholian Web"	Howard A. Anderson Company, The Westheimer Company, Van der Veer Photo Effects, Cinema Research	NBC

=== 1970s ===
Year	Program	Episode	Nominees	Network
1970
1970	Outstanding Achievement in Any Area of Creative Technical Crafts			
1970	Mission: Impossible		John Burke	CBS
1970	My World and Welcome to It		Howard A. Anderson, Wilfred M. Cline, Bill Hansard	NBC
1978
1978	Outstanding Individual Achievement in Creative Technical Crafts			
1978	The Return of Captain Nemo		L. B. Abbott, Frank Van der Veer	CBS
1979
1979	Outstanding Individual Achievement in Creative Technical Crafts			
1979	Battlestar Galactica	"Saga of a Star World"	John Dykstra, Richard Edlund, Joseph Goss	CBS
1979	A Fire in the Sky		Joe Unsinn	NBC

=== 1980s ===
Year	Program	Episode	Nominees	Network
1980
1980	Outstanding Individual Achievement in Creative Technical Crafts			
1980	All Quiet on the Western Front		Roy Whybrow	CBS
1980	The Muppet Show	"Alan Arkin"	Leslee Asch, Edward G. Christie, Barbara S. Davis, Faz Fazakas, Nomi Frederick, Michael K. Frith, Amy Van Gilder, Dave Goelz, Marianne Harms, Larry Jameson, Mari Kaestle, Rollin Krewson, Tim Miller, Bob Payne, Jan Rosenthal, Don Sahlin, Caroly Wilcox	Syndicated
1980	The Muppet Show	"Kenny Rogers"	Edward G. Christie, Barbara S. Davis, Faz Fazakas, Nomi Frederick, Michael K. Frith, Amy Van Gilder, Dave Goelz, Larry Jameson, Mari Kaestle, Rollin Krewson, Tim Miller, Bob Payne, Jan Rosenthal, Don Sahlin, Caroly Wilcox	Syndicated
1981
1981	Outstanding Individual Achievement in Creative Technical Crafts			
1981	Cosmos	"The Shores of the Cosmic Ocean"	John Allison, Don Davis, Jon Lomberg, Anne Norcia, Ernie Norcia, Adolf Schaller, Rick Sternbach	PBS
1981	Cosmos	"The Shores of the Cosmic Ocean"	Bob Buckner, Steve Burum, Jim Dow, John Gale, Larry Heider, Mike Johnson, Robert C. King, Cleve Landsberg, Joseph Matza, Carey Melcher, George C. Reilly, Joe Wolcott	PBS
1983
1983	The Winds of War	"Defiance"	Jackson De Govia, Leslie Huntley, Peter Kleinow, Michael Minor, Gene Warren Jr.	ABC
1983	SCTV Network	"The Energy Ball" / "Sweeps Week Show"	Bill Goddard, Gary L. Smith	NBC
1984
1984	The Day After		Robert Blalack, Chris Dierdorff, Dan Nosenchuck, Dan Pinkham, Chris Regan, Nancy Rushlow, Larry Stevens	ABC
1984	The 26th Annual Grammy Awards		William M. Klages	CBS
1984	V: The Final Battle		Richard L. Bennett, Phillip Feiner, Michael Glickman, Jack Hulen, Chuck McKimson, Steven Rundell, Ken Smith, Charles Strongo, Charles Ulm, Douglas Ulm, Marvin Zenzeper	NBC
1985
1985	A.D.		Syd Dutton, Dennis Glouner, Lynn Ledgerwood, Bill Taylor, Albert Whitlock, Mark Whitlock	NBC
1985	The Brain		John Allison	PBS
1985	The Ewok Adventure		Jon Berg, John R. Ellis, Chris Evans, Harley Jessup, Dennis Muren, Michael Pangrazio, Phil Tippett	ABC
1985	The Hugga Bunch		Tim Donahue, Mike Hanan, Bill Mesa, Gene Rizzardi	Syndicated
1986
1986	Dinosaur!		Phil Tippett	CBS
1986	Ewoks: The Battle for Endor		Michael J. McAlister	ABC
1989
1989	War and Remembrance		Steve Anderson, Bill Cruse, Godfrey Godar, Martin Gutteridge, Bill Schirmer, Simon Smith, Charles D. Staffell, Ed Williams, Egil Woxholt	ABC
1989	Friday the 13th: The Series	"13 O'Clock"	John Gajdecki, Gary L. Smith	Syndicated
1989	The Infinite Voyage	"The Geometry of Life"	John Allison	PBS
1989	Star Trek: The Next Generation	"Q Who"	Dan Curry, Ronald B. Moore, Peter Moyer, Steve Price	Syndicated
1989	Thirtysomething	"Michael Writes a Story"	Victor Dubois, Jeanne Byrd Hall, Simon Holden, Steve Wyskocil	ABC

=== 1990s ===
Year	Program	Episode	Nominees	Network
1990
1990	By Dawn's Early Light		Craig Barron, Bill Mather, Charlie Mullen, Michael Pangrazio	HBO
1990	Miracle Landing		John Coats, Tim Donahue, William Mesa, David B. Sharp, Tony Tremblay	CBS
1990	Great Performances	"The Orchestra"	Paul Bachmann, John O'Connor, Zbig Rybczynski, Ryszard Welnowski	PBS
1990	Star Trek: The Next Generation	"Deja Q"	Dan Curry, Don Lee, Ronald B. Moore, Peter Moyer, Steve Price	Syndicated
1990	Star Trek: The Next Generation	"Tin Man"	Don Greenberg, Gary Hutzel, Don Lee, Robert Legato, Erik Nash, Michael Okuda, Steve Price	Syndicated
1991
1991	Ironclads		Martin Gutteridge	TNT
1991	The Magic of David Copperfield XIII: Mystery on the Orient Express		Don Wayne, Tim White, Chris Wilson	CBS
1991	Star Trek: The Next Generation	"The Best of Both Worlds, Part 1"	Syd Dutton, Don Greenberg, Gary Hutzel, Don Lee, Robert Legato, Erik Nash, Michael Okuda, Steve Price, Robert Stromberg, David Takemura, Bill Taylor	Syndicated
1991	Star Trek: The Next Generation	"The Best of Both Worlds, Part 2"	Pat Clancey, Syd Dutton, Gary Hutzel, Don Lee, Robert Legato, Erik Nash, Michael Okuda, Steve Price, David Takemura, Bill Taylor	Syndicated
1992	Outstanding Individual Achievement in Special Visual Effects			
1992	The Last Halloween		Henry Anderson, Paul Boyington, Dale Fay, Brad Lewis	CBS
1992	Star Trek: The Next Generation	"Conundrum"	Pat Clancey, Dennis Hoerter, Adam Howard, Adrian Hurley, Gary Hutzel, Don Lee, Robert Legato, David Takemura	Syndicated
1992	Star Trek: The Next Generation	"A Matter of Time"	Dan Curry, Syd Dutton, Adam Howard, Don Lee, Ronald B. Moore, Erik Nash, Peter Sternlicht, Robert Stromberg, David Takemura	Syndicated
1993
1993	Babylon 5	"The Gathering"	Paul Beigle-Bryant, Shannon Casey, Ron Thornton	Syndicated
1993	Star Trek: Deep Space Nine	"Emissary"	Dennis Blakey, Michael Gibson, Gary Hutzel, Robert Legato	Syndicated
1993	The Young Indiana Jones Chronicles	"Young Indiana Jones and the Scandal of 1920"	Eric Chauvin, Mark Holmes, Paul Huston, Allison Smith-Murphy, Yusei Uesugi	ABC
1994
1994	Star Trek: The Next Generation	"All Good Things..."	Michael Backauskas, Dan Curry, Adam Howard, Erik Nash, Scott Rader, David Stipes	Syndicated
1995
1995	Earth 2	"First Contact"	David Goldberg, Tim Landry, Daniel Lombardo, Kevin Pike, Michael Shea	NBC
1995	Star Trek: Voyager	"Caretaker"	Michael Backauskas, Joe Bauer, Dan Curry, Joshua Cushner, Don Greenberg, Adam Howard, Don Lee, John Parenteau, Scott Rader, Joshua Rose, David Stipes, Robert Stromberg, Edward L. Williams	UPN
1995	Fatherland		Richard Patterson, Robert Scifo, Robert Stromberg, David S. Williams	HBO
1995	Star Trek: Deep Space Nine	"The Jem'Hadar"	Les Bernstein, Pat Clancey, Joshua Cushner, Adam Howard, Don Lee, Erik Nash, Glenn Neufeld, David Takemura	Syndicated
1995	Young Indiana Jones and the Hollywood Follies		Joseph Brattesani, Eric Chauvin, Susan Davis, Ricky Eyres, Kristine Hanna, Paul Huston	Family
1996
1996	Gulliver's Travels		Tim Webber	NBC
1996	Family Matters	"Send in the Clone"	Kelly Sandefur	ABC
1996	Space: Above and Beyond	"Never No More"	Glenn Campbell, Karl Denham, Wayne England, Justin Hammond, David Jones, Genevieve Lovitt, Tim McHugh, Matt Merkovitch, Scott Wheeler	Fox
1996	Star Trek: Deep Space Nine	"The Way of the Warrior"	Josh Cushner, Judy Elkins, Steve Fong, Dennis Hoerter, Adam Howard, Gary Hutzel, Don Lee, Fredric Meininger, Glenn Neufeld, Scott Rader, Jim Rider, Joshua Rose	Syndicated
1996	The Tuskegee Airmen		Fred Cramer, David Fiske, Raymond McIntyre, Michael Muscal	HBO
1996	Young Indiana Jones and the Attack of the Hawkmen		Joseph Brattesani, Eric Chauvin, Danielle Ciccorelli, Susan Davis, Kristine Hanna, Bill Mather	Family
1997
1997	The Odyssey	"Part 1"	Mike McGee	NBC
1997	Asteroid		Larry Detwiler, Adam Ealovega, Rich Helmer, Steve Melchiorre, Sam Nicholson, Dan Schmit, Tommy Sindicich, Jaison Stritch	NBC
1997	Star Trek: Deep Space Nine	"Trials and Tribble-ations"	Kevin P. Bouchez, Judy Elkins, Steve Fong, Adam Howard, Adrian Hurley, Gary Hutzel, Gregory Jein, Don Lee, Paul Maples, Davy T. Nethercutt, Laurie Resnick	Syndicated
1997	3rd Rock from the Sun	"A Nightmare on Dick Street"	Glen Bennett, Patrick Shearn, Chris Staves	NBC
1998
1998	Outstanding Special Visual Effects for a Series			
1998	Yo-Yo Ma Inspired by Bach	"The Sound of the Carceri"	Pedro Pires	PBS
1998	Star Trek: Deep Space Nine	"One Little Ship"	Kevin P. Bouchez, Steve Bowen, Judy Elkins, Steve Fong, Adrian Hurley, Gary Hutzel, Paul Maples, Fredric Meininger, Gary Monak, Davy T. Nethercutt, Laurie Resnick	Syndicated
1998	Star Trek: Voyager	"Year of Hell, Part 2"	Eric Chauvin, Art Codron, Paul Hill, Koji Kuramura, Adam "Mojo" Lebowitz, Greg Rainoff, Mitch Suskin, John Teska	UPN
1998	Stargate SG-1	"Children of the Gods"	David Alexander, Michelle Comens, John Gajdecki, Robert Habros, Peter Mastalyr, Ted Rae	Showtime
1998	Suddenly Susan	"I Love You, I Think"	Tim Bird, Lori Freitag-Hild, Kevin Prendiville, Jerry Spivack, Mark Zarate	NBC
1998	Outstanding Special Visual Effects for a Miniseries, Movie or a Special			
1998	Merlin	"Part 1"	Avtar Bains, William Bartlett, Murray Butler, Richard Conway, Matthew Cope, Tim Greenwood, Stefan Lange, George Roper, Pedro Sabrosa, Tim Webber, Angus Wilson	NBC
1998	From the Earth to the Moon	"1968"	David Altenau, Tony Cutrono, Burt Dalton, Ernest Farino, Matthew Gratzner, John Hoffman, Evan Jacobs, Adam Lovell, Eroc Moralls, James Roberts, Ariel Velasco Shaw	HBO
1998	Moby Dick		Kit Amore, Peter Armstrong, Tim Crosbie, Jamie Doolan, Graham Duesberry, Dale Duguid, Rob Heggie, Mike Logan, Brian Pearce, James Rogers, Ry Snow, David Tremont, Lisa Wang	USA
1999
1999	Outstanding Special Visual Effects for a Series			
1999	Star Trek: Voyager	"Dark Frontier"	Rob Bonchune, Elizabeth Castro, Arthur J. Codron, Dan Curry, Don Greenberg, Paul Hill, Adam "Mojo" Lebowitz, Ronald B. Moore, Greg Rainoff, Mitch Suskin, John Teska	UPN
1999	Star Trek: Deep Space Nine	"What You Leave Behind"	Rob Bonchune, Kevin P. Bouchez, Adam Buckner, Arthur J. Codron, Dan Curry, Judy Elkins, Steve Fong, Don Greenberg, Paul Hill, Sherry L. Hitch, Adam Howard, Gary Hutzel, David Lombardi, Paul Maples, Gary Monak, Davy T. Nethercutt, Greg Rainoff, David Stipes, Larry Younger	Syndicated
1999	Star Trek: Voyager	"Thirty Days"	Bruce Branit, Liz Castro, Dan Curry, Paul Hill, Ronald B. Moore, Greg Rainoff	UPN
1999	Star Trek: Voyager	"Timeless"	John Allardice, Robert Bonchune, Eric Chauvin, Arthur J. Codron, Dan Curry, Don Greenberg, Sherry L. Hitch, Greg Rainoff, Mitch Suskin, John Teska, Ron Thornton	UPN
1999	Total Recall 2070	"Machine Dreams"	David Alexander, Barb Benoit, Ray Caesar, Jon Campfens, John Cox, Rick Gajdecki, Sasha Jarh, Van LaPointe, Joel Skeete, Linda Tremblay	Showtime
1999	Outstanding Special Visual Effects for a Miniseries, Movie or a Special			
1999	Alice in Wonderland		Avtar Baines, William Bartlett, Nick Bennett, Oliver Bersey, David Booth, Murray Butler, Richard Conway, Jamie Courtier, Ben Cronin, Bob Hollow, Andy Lomas, Alex Parkinson, Martin Parsons, George Roper, Pedro Sabrosa, Angus Wilson	NBC
1999	Cleopatra	"Part 1"	Laurent Cordier, Garth Inns, Dag Ivarsoy, Matt Johnson, Hayden Jones, Paul Lambert, John Lockwood, Andrew Merlino, Ray Rankine, Dominic Tuohy	ABC
1999	Max Q		Brian Battles, Trevor Cawood, Kay Cloud, Andy Freeman, Gary Gutierrez, Winston Helgason, Richard Matsushita, Dale Mayeda, Charles Meredith, Brian Moylan, David Nix, Stephen Pepper, Gary Poole, Halbo van der Klaauw	ABC
1999	Stephen King's Storm of the Century	"Part 1"	Christopher Bond, Steven Bowen, Lucy Hofert, Danny Mudgett, Robert Scifo, Boyd Shermis, David Stump	ABC

=== 2000s ===
Year	Program	Episode	Nominees	Network
2000	Outstanding Special Visual Effects for a Series			
2000	The X-Files	"First Person Shooter"	Deena Burkett, Don Greenberg, Monique Klauer, Bill Millar, Steve Scott, Cory Strassburger, Steve Strassburger, Jeff Zaman	Fox
2000	Star Trek: Voyager	"The Haunting of Deck Twelve"	Bruce Branit, Elizabeth Castro, Dan Curry, John Gross, Paul Hill, Jeremy Hunt, Ronald B. Moore, Fred Pienkos, Greg Rainoff	UPN
2000	Star Trek: Voyager	"Life Line"	Les Bernstein, Bruce Branit, Elizabeth Castro, Dan Curry, John Gross, Paul Hill, Jeremy Hunt, Ronald B. Moore, Fred Pienkos	UPN
2000	Stargate SG-1	"Nemesis"	Michelle Comens, Robin Hackl, James G. Hebb, Jeremy Hoey, Aruna Inversin, Kent Matheson, James Tichenor, Craig Van Den Biggelaar, Bruce Woloshyn	Showtime
2000	The X-Files	"Rush"	Deena Burkett, Don Greenberg, Monique Klauer, Bill Millar	Fox
2000	Outstanding Special Visual Effects for a Miniseries, Movie or a Special			
2000	Walking with Dinosaurs		Tim Greenwood, Jez Harris, Daren Horley, Alec Knox, Virgil Manning, David Marsh, Mike McGee, Mike Milne, Carlos Rosas	Discovery
2000	The 72nd Annual Academy Awards	"Billy's Film"	Patrick Clancey, Chris Clausing, Mark Intravartolo, Deborah Ristic	ABC
2000	Aftershock: Earthquake in New York	"Part 1"	James G. Hebb, Michael Joyce, Stephen Pepper, Lisa Sepp-Wilson, Tim Storvick, Lee Wilson	CBS
2000	Jason and the Argonauts	"Part 2"	Hal Bertram, David Booth, Daren Horley, Alec Knox, Andy Lomas, Virgil Manning, George Roper, Carlos Rosas, Pedro Sabrosa	NBC
2000	The Magical Legend of the Leprechauns	"Part 1"	Dimitri Bakalow, Ken Dailey, Dag Ivarsoy, Matt Johnson, Paul Lambert, Adam McInnes, Jonathan Neill	NBC
2001	Outstanding Special Visual Effects for a Series			
2001	Star Trek: Voyager	"Endgame"	Robert Bonchune, Eric Chauvin, Art Codron, Dan Curry, Steve Fong, Ronald B. Moore, Greg Rainoff, Mitch Suskin, John Teska	UPN
2001	Dark Angel	"Pilot"	Neill Blomkamp, Christian Boudman, Trevor Cawood, Mike Leben, Brian Moylan, Michael Porterfield, Wes Sargent, Elan Soltes	Fox
2001	Star Trek: Voyager	"Workforce, Part 2"	Dan Curry, Paul Hill, David Lombardi, Brandon MacDougall, Ronald B. Moore, David Morton, Greg Rainoff, John Teska, Chad Zimmerman	UPN
2001	Stargate SG-1	"Exodus"	Rod Bland, Doug Campbell, Debora Dunphy, Shannon Gurney, Robin Hackl, Kent Matheson, James Tichenor, Craig Van Den Biggelaar, Bruce Woloshyn	Showtime
2001	Stargate SG-1	"Small Victories"	Michelle Comens, Debora Dunphy, Robin Hackl, Allan Henderson, Aruna Inversin, Kent Matheson, Judy Shane, James Tichenor, Craig Van Den Biggelaar	Showtime
2001	Outstanding Special Visual Effects for a Miniseries, Movie or a Special			
2001	Frank Herbert's Dune	"Part 1"	Anthony Alderson, Elaine Essex Thompson, Ernest Farino, James Healy, Frank Isaacs, Laurel Klick, Tim McHugh, Greg Nicotero, Chris Zapara	Sci Fi
2001	Allosaurus: A Walking with Dinosaurs Special		David Booth, Richard Dexter, Theo Facey, Tim Greenwood, Karen Halliwell, Daren Horley, Sophie Lodge, Virgil Manning, George Roper	Discovery
2001	Haven		David Alexander, Janeen Elliott, Mark Fordham, Noel Hooper, Van LaPointe, Matthew Schofield, Sean Stranks, Tom Turnbull, Allan Walker	CBS
2001	Horatio Hornblower	"Mutiny"	Phil Attfield, Simon Frame, Alex Gurucharri, Martin Gutteridge, Tom Harris, Barry Woodman	A&E
2001	Race Against Time		Tim Donahue, Adam Ealovega, Sam Nicholson, Victor Scalise, Jaison Stritch, Peter Ware	TNT
2002	Outstanding Special Visual Effects for a Series			
2002	Star Trek: Enterprise	"Broken Bow"	Robert Bonchune, Elizabeth Castro, Arthur J. Codron, Dan Curry, Steven Fong, Paul Hill, Ronald B. Moore, David Morton, Gregory Rainoff	UPN
2002	Smallville	"Pilot"	Rod Bland, Mark Breakspear, Ryan Cronin, Colin Liggett, Brian Moylan, Jinnie Pak, Marc Roth, Wes Sargent, Elan Soltes	The WB
2002	Star Trek: Enterprise	"Breaking the Ice"	Adam Buckner, John Gross, Paul Hill, Adam Howard, Fred Pienkos, Greg Rainoff, Eddie Robison, Steven Rogers, David Stipes	UPN
2002	Stargate SG-1	"Enemies"	Tom Brydon, Doug Campbell, Michelle Comens, Shannon Gurney, Greg Hansen, Brian Harder, James Tichenor, Bruce Woloshyn, Kyle Yoneda	Showtime
2002	Stargate SG-1	"Revelations"	Mark Breakspear, Michelle Comens, Adam de Bosch Kemper, Shannon Gurney, Robin Hackl, Kevin Little, Krista McLean, James Tichenor, Craig Van Den Biggelaar	Showtime
2002	Outstanding Special Visual Effects for a Miniseries, Movie or a Special			
2002	Dinotopia	"Part 3"	Mike Eames, Dadi Einarsson, Alec Knox, Craig Lyn, Mike McGee, Quentin Miles, Ben Morris, Pedro Sabrosa, Tim Webber	ABC
2002	Band of Brothers	"Day of Days"	Mat Beck, Angus Bickerton, Charles Cash, Laurent Hugueniot, Cindy Jones, Louis Mackall, Karl Mooney, Nigel Stone	HBO
2002	Band of Brothers	"Replacements"	Angus Bickerton, Ken Dailey, John Lockwood, Mike Mulholland, Mark Nettleton, Joe Pavlo, Nigel Stone, Joss Williams	HBO
2002	Superfire		John Allardice, Steve Courtney, Sherry L. Hitch, John McGinley, George Port, Jonathan Rothbart, Mark Sadeghi, Lee Stringer, Ron Thornton	ABC
2002	Walking with Prehistoric Beasts		Tim Greenwood, Jez Harris, Daren Horley, Virgil Manning, Mike Milne, Sirio Quintavalle, George Roper, Sarah Tosh, Max Tyrie	Discovery
2003	Outstanding Special Visual Effects for a Series			
2003	Firefly	"Serenity"	Kristen Leigh Branan, Jarrod Davis, Chris Jones, Terry Naas, Rocco Passionino, Loni Peristere, Emile Smith, Lee Stringer, Kyle Toucher	Fox
2003	Buffy the Vampire Slayer	"Chosen"	Rick Baumgartner, David Funston, Patricia Gannon, Christopher Jones, Michael D. Leone, Loni Peristere, Kevin Quattro, Ronald Thornton, Chris Zapara	UPN
2003	Star Trek: Enterprise	"The Crossing"	Dan Curry, Pierre Drolet, Paul Hill, Armen V. Kevorkian, Ronald B. Moore, David Morton, Sean Scott, John Teska	UPN
2003	Star Trek: Enterprise	"Dead Stop"	Robert Bonchune, Art Codron, Pierre Drolet, Steve Fong, Koji Kuramura, Greg Rainoff, Sean Scott, Mitch Suskin, John Teska	UPN
2003	Star Trek: Enterprise	"The Expanse"	Bruce Branit, Elizabeth Castro, Dan Curry, Eric Hance, Paul Hill, Ronald B. Moore, Fred Pienkos, Greg Rainoff, Sean Scott	UPN
2003	Outstanding Special Visual Effects for a Miniseries, Movie or a Special			
2003	Frank Herbert's Children of Dune	"Part 1"	Glenn Campbell, Ernest Farino, Andrew Harlow, Michael F. Hoover, Barry Howell, Vít Komrzý, Don L. McCoy, Tim McHugh, Chris Zapara	Sci Fi
2003	Building the Great Pyramid		Jordi Bares, Lorraine Cooper, Stuart Cripps, Henrik Holmberg, David Houghton, Angela Hunt, Chris Thomas, Nick Webber, Adrian Wyer	Discovery
2003	The Lost World	"Part 2"	William Bartlett, Darren Byford, Ben Cronin, Scott Griffin, Jez Harris, John Howarth, Virgil Manning, Paul Verrall, Simon Whalley	A&E
2003	Point of Origin		Patrick Clancey, Mark Intravartolo, Linda McDonnell, Danny Mudgett, Rocco Passionino	HBO
2003	Taken	"Jacob and Jesse"	Erik Gamache, Tim Guyer, James Lima, Dave Mclean, Peter Nye, Josh Saeta, Salar Saleh, Doug Wolf	Sci Fi
2004	Outstanding Special Visual Effects for a Series			
2004	Star Trek: Enterprise	"Countdown"	Elizabeth Castro, Daniel F. Curry, Eric Hance, Paul Hill, Ronald B. Moore, Fred Pienkos, Greg Rainoff, Sean Scott, Chris Zapara	UPN
2004	Dead Like Me	"Pilot"	David Allinson, Nick Boughen, Mark Breakspear, Adam de Bosch Kemper, Robert Habros, Colin Liggett, Kevin Little, Jennifer McEachern, Carmen Pollard	Showtime
2004	Stargate SG-1	"Lost City, Part 2"	Michelle Comens, Chris Doll, Shannon Gurney, James Halverson, Patrick Kalyn, Krista McLean, James Tichenor, Craig Van Den Biggelaar, Bruce Woloshyn	Sci Fi
2004	Star Trek: Enterprise	"The Council"	Art Codron, Dan Curry, Pierre Drolet, Steve Fong, Sean Jackson, Koji Kuramura, Greg Rainoff, Mike Stetson, John Teska	UPN
2004	Stephen King's Kingdom Hospital	"Thy Kingdom Come"	Adam de Bosch Kemper, Shannon Gurney, Jeremy Hoey, Kevin Little, Bradley Mullennix, Stephen Pepper, James Tichenor, Simon van de Lagemaat, Craig Van Den Biggelaar	ABC
2004	Outstanding Special Visual Effects for a Miniseries, Movie or a Special			
2004	Dreamkeeper	"Part 1"	Nicholas Brooks, Ludo Fealy, Luc Froehlicher, Alastair Hearsum, Sophie Leclerc, Charlie Noble, Eve Ramboz, John Spooner, John Vegher	ABC
2004	Angels in America	"Perestroika"	Richard Edlund, Don Greenberg, Greg Jein, Steve Kirshoff, Lawrence Littleton, Michele Moen, Liz Ralston, Ron Simonson, Stefano Trivelli	HBO
2004	Battlestar Galactica	"Night 1"	Jarrod Davis, Patti Gannon, Aram Granger, Gary Hutzel, Christopher Jones, Kevin Quattro, Emile Edwin Smith, Lee Stringer, Kyle Toucher	Sci Fi
2004	10.5	"Night 1"	Jordan Benwick, Sebastien Bergeron, Craig Calvert, Tristam Gieni, Michael Joyce, Jean LaPointe, Les Quinn, Lisa Sepp-Wilson, Lee Wilson	NBC
2004	The Winning Season		Loren Bivens, Deane Boeka, Christopher DeCristo, George Garcia, Bill Graham, Bob Scifo, Craig Weiss, Niel Wray	TNT
2005	Outstanding Special Visual Effects for a Series			
2005	Lost	"Pilot"	Laurent M. Abecassis, Archie Ahuna, Kevin Blank, Steve Fong, Benoit Girard, Kevin Kutchaver, Jonathan Spencer Levy, Bob Lloyd, Mitch Suskin	ABC
2005	Battlestar Galactica	"33"	Dustin Adair, Patricia Gannon, Michael Gibson, Matt Gore, Gary Hutzel, Gabriel Koerner, Adam "Mojo" Lebowitz, Mark Shimer, Lee Stringer	Sci Fi
2005	Battlestar Galactica	"The Hand of God"	Tom Archer, Brenda Campbell, Mike Gibson, Jeremy Hoey, Gary Hutzel, Andrew Karr, Kirsten Meekison, Daniel Osaki, Adrian Van der Park	Sci Fi
2005	Stargate Atlantis	"Rising"	Jose Burgos, Michelle Comens, Chris Doll, Debora Dunphy, John Gajdecki, Dan Mayer, Jinnie Pak, Wes Sargent, Bruce Woloshyn	Sci Fi
2005	Stargate SG-1	"Reckoning"	Michelle Comens, Adam de Bosch Kemper, Ryan Jensen, Brett Keyes, Krista McLean, James Rorick, James Tichenor, Craig Van Den Biggelaar, Karen Watson	Sci Fi
2005	Outstanding Special Visual Effects for a Miniseries, Movie or a Special			
2005	The Life and Death of Peter Sellers		Camille Cellucci, Neil Culley, Andrew Fowler, Barrie Hemsley, Robin Huffer, Mark Intravartolo, Andy MacLeod, Joe Pavlo, Paul Tuersley	HBO
2005	Dragons: A Fantasy Made Real		Laurent Benhamo, Neil Glasbey, Daren Horley, Alec Knox, Dan Lavender, Christian Manz, Catherine Mullan, Sirio Quintavalle, Sarah Tosh	Animal Planet
2005	Farscape: The Peacekeeper Wars	"Night 2"	Steve Anderson, Dominic Bean, David Booth, Benita Carey, Lynne Cartwright, Jeremy Howdin, Brett Margules, Rob Nicol, Mike Seymour	Sci Fi
2005	Legend of Earthsea		Sebastien Bergeron, Eric Grenaudier, Jared Jones, Jean LaPointe, Sam Nicholson, Earl Lawrence Paraszczynec, Lisa Sepp-Wilson, Asa Svedberg, Lee Wilson	Sci Fi
2005	Supervolcano		Grahame Andrew, John-Paul Harney, Rob Harvey, Mark Richardson, Abbie Tucker-Williams, Max Wright, Tim Zaccheo	Discovery
2006	Outstanding Special Visual Effects for a Series			
2006	Rome	"The Stolen Eagle"	Charles Darby, Barrie Hemsley, Clare Herbert, Duncan Kinnaird, James Madigan, Anna Panton, Joe Pavlo, Dan Pettipher, Michele Sciolette	HBO
2006	Battlestar Galactica	"Resurrection Ship"	Doug Drexler, Michael Gibson, Gary Hutzel, Lane Jolly, Steve Kullback, Daniel Osaki, Mark Shimer, Kyle Toucher, Chris Zapara	Sci Fi
2006	Lost	"Live Together, Die Alone"	Archie Ahuna, Kevin Blank, Eric Chauvin, Scott Dewis, Steve Fong, Spencer Levy, Bob Lloyd, Mitch Suskin, Jay Worth	ABC
2006	Perfect Disaster	"Super Tornado"	Gareth Edwards, Bob Trevino	Discovery
2006	Surface	"Episode 1"	Eric Chauvin, Pierre Drolet, Steve Fong, Eric Hance, Dave Morton, Neal Sopata, Mitch Suskin, John Teska	NBC
2006	Outstanding Special Visual Effects for a Miniseries, Movie or a Special			
2006	The Triangle	"Part 1"	Volker Engel, Paul Graff, Robin Graham, Ben Grossman, Sam Khorshid, Conrad Murrey, Todd Sheridan Perry, Ingo Putze, Marc Weigert	Sci Fi
2006	Before the Dinosaurs		Nigel Booth, Darren Byford, Neil Glasbey, Tim Greenwood, Daren Horley, Jeremy Hunt, Chloe Leland, Peter Thorn	Discovery
2006	The Nightingale (Great Performances)		Ugo Bimar, Paul Carteron, Anne Chatelain, Oliver Garcelon, Alexander Gregoire, Guillaume Ho Tsong Fang, Julien Limouse, Hugues Namur, Morgan Sagel	PBS
2006	Into the West	"Hell on Wheels"	Glenn Campbell, Christopher DeCristo, Eric Ehemann, George Garcia, Don L. McCoy, Tim McHugh, Christopher Moore, Craig Weiss, Niel Wray	TNT
2006	Mammoth		Christian Bloch, Stefan Bredereck, Liz Castro, Scott Dewis, Armen V. Kevorkian, Spencer Levy, David Morton, Matt Scharf, Jason Zimmerman	Sci Fi
2007	Outstanding Special Visual Effects for a Series			
2007	Battlestar Galactica	"Exodus, Part 2"	Gary Hutzel, Michael Gibson, Doug Drexler, Adam "Mojo" Lebowitz, Jeremy Hoey, Tom Archer, Andrew Karr, Alec McClymont, Brenda Campbell	Sci Fi
2007	Eureka	"Pilot"	Robert Habros, Matthew S. Gore, Darren Marcoux, Elizabeth Alvarez, Lane Jolly, Ben Funk, Tom Tennisco, Jarrod Davis, Jamie Clark	Sci Fi
2007	Grey's Anatomy	"Walk on Water"	Sam Nicholson, Scott Ramsey, Val Pfahning, Anthony Ocampo, Mike Cook, Diego Galtieri, Eric Grenaudier, Al Lopez, Jason Gustafson	ABC
2007	Heroes	"Five Years Gone"	Mark Kolpack, Mark Spatny, Gary D'Amico, Daniel Kumiega, Cedric Tomacruz, Diego Galtieri, Chris Martin, Ragui Hanna, Jon Rosenthal	NBC
2007	Rome	"Philippi"	James Madigan, Barrie Hemsley, Anna Panton, Merrin Jensen, Paula Pope, Daniel Acon, Duncan Kinnaird, Gary Brozenich, Doug Larmour	HBO
2007	Outstanding Special Visual Effects for a Miniseries, Movie or a Special			
2007	Nightmares & Dreamscapes: From the Stories of Stephen King	"Battleground"	Sam Nicholson, Eric Grenaudier, Mark Spatny, Adalberto Lopez, Michael Cook, Daniel Kumiega, Megan Omi, Ryan Wieber, Marc Van Buuren	TNT
2007	Bury My Heart at Wounded Knee		David Goldberg, Chris Del Conte, Joseph Bell, Justin Mitchell, Erik Bruhwiler, Tommy Tran, Benoit Girard, Tammy Sutton, Andrew Roberts	HBO
2007	Drive	"The Starting Line"	Loni Peristere, Raoul Yorke Bolognini, Chris Jones, Jarrod Davis, Mark Shimer, Jamie Clark, Steve Meyer, Tyler Nathan, Nate Overstrom	Fox
2007	Nightmares & Dreamscapes: From the Stories of Stephen King	"The End of the Whole Mess"	David Vana, Peter Stubbs, Vit Komrzy, Marc Van Buuren, Monika Pavlickova, Jiri Linhart, Jaroslav Poklensky, Jan Heusler, Jiri Forejt	TNT
2007	The Path to 9/11	"Night 1"	Anthony Paterson, Tom Turnbull, Robert Crowther, Ian Britton, Tavia Charlton, Joel Skeete, Graham Cunningham, Andrew Nguyen, Kristijan Danilovski	ABC
2007	Secrets of the Deep		Tim Greenwood, Pete Farrer, Lorna Paterson, Antony Carysforth, Pete Metelko, Theo Facey, Adam Burnett, Jason Horley	Discovery
2008	Outstanding Special Visual Effects for a Series			
2008	Battlestar Galactica	"He That Believeth in Me"	Gary Hutzel, Michael Gibson, David Takemura, Doug Drexler, Kyle Toucher, Sean Jackson, Pierre Drolet, Aurore de Blois, Derek Ledbetter	Sci Fi
2008	Heroes	"Four Months Ago..."	Eric Grenaudier, Mark Spatny, Gary D'Amico, Mike Enriquez, Michael Cook, Diego Galtieri, Ryan Wieber, Chris Martin, Daniel Kumiega	NBC
2008	Human Body: Pushing the Limits	"Strength"	Tim Goodchild, Louise Hussey, Mike Tucker, Nick Kool, Hayden Jones, Mark Pascoe, Angela Noble, Peter Tyler	Discovery
2008	Jericho	"Patriots and Tyrants"	Michael Cliett, Andrew Orloff, Blythe Dalton, John Stirber, Chris Jones, Lane Jolly, Johnathan R. Banta, Josh Hooker	CBS
2008	Stargate Atlantis	"Adrift"	Mark Savela, Shannon Gurney, Erica Henderson, Jason Gross, Jamie Yukio Kawano, Michael Lowes, Giles Hancock, Jeremy Kehler, Daniel Osaki	Sci Fi
2008	Terminator: The Sarah Connor Chronicles	"Pilot"	James Lima, Jon Massey, Chris Zapara, Lane Jolly, Steve Graves, Rick Shick, Jeff West, Bradley Mullennix, Andrew Orloff	Fox
2008	Outstanding Special Visual Effects for a Miniseries, Movie or a Special			
2008	John Adams	"Join or Die"	Erik Henry, Jeff Goldman, Paul Graff, Steve Kullback, Christina Graff, David Van Dyke, Robert Stromberg, Edwardo Mendez, Ken Gorrell	HBO
2008	Comanche Moon	"Part 1"	Scott Ramsey, Randy Moore, Chris Martin, Megan Omi, Richard Sachar, Ragui Hanna, Daniel Kumiega, Cedric Tomacruz, Kristin Johnson	CBS
2008	The Company	"Part 2"	Viktor Muller, Vit Komrzy, Jan Vseticek, Miro Gal, Peter Nemec, Jiri Stamfest, Jaroslav Matys	TNT
2008	Life After People		Matt Drummond, Max Ivins, Steffen Schlachtenhaufen, Melinka Thompson-Godoy, Andrea D'Amico, Danny Kim, Dave Morton, James Allen May, Casey Benn	History
2008	Tin Man	"Part 1"	Lee Wilson, Lisa Sepp-Wilson, Sebastien Bergeron, Todd Liddiard, Philippe Thibault, Les Quinn, Mike Goddard, Ken Lee, Andrew Domachowski	Sci Fi
2009	Outstanding Special Visual Effects for a Series			
2009	Heroes	"The Second Coming" / "The Butterfly Effect"	Mark Scott Spatny, Eric Grenaudier, Gary D'Amico, Michael Cook, Daniel Kumiega, Chris Martin, Meliza Fermin, Ryan Wieber, Diego Galtieri	NBC
2009	Battlestar Galactica	"Daybreak, Part 2"	Gary Hutzel, Michael Gibson, Jesse Toves, Sean Jackson, Kyle Toucher, Pierre Drolet, Greg Behrens, Heather McAuliff, Dave Morton	Syfy
2009	Fringe	"Pilot"	Kevin Blank, Jay Worth, Andrew Orloff, Johnathan R. Banta, Steve Graves, Jonathan Spencer Levy, Scott Dewis, Steve Fong, Tom Turnbull	Fox
2009	Ghost Whisperer	"Ghost in the Machine"	Armen V. Kevorkian, Matt Scharf, David Morton, Stefan Bredereck, Rick Ramirez, Ben Campanero, Arthur J. Codron, Eric Haas, Ed Ruiz	CBS
2009	Sanctuary	"Sanctuary for All"	Lee Wilson, Lisa Wilson, Sebastien Bergeron, Les Quinn, Matt Belbin, Mladden Miholjcic, Ken Lee, Philippe Thibault, Lionel Lim	Syfy
2009	Outstanding Special Visual Effects for a Miniseries, Movie or a Special			
2009	Generation Kill	"The Cradle of Civilization"	Adam McInnes, Courtney Vanderslice-Law, Antony Bluff, Paul Edwards, Ken Dailey, Stephane Paris, David Sewell, Stuart Partridge, Jean-Paul Rovela	HBO
2009	Into the Storm		Gary Brown, Sue Rowe, Angie Wills, Chloe Grysole, Phil Brown, Mark Robinson, Andy Robinson, Sevendalino Khay	HBO

=== 2010s ===
Year	Program	Episode	Nominees	Network
2010	Outstanding Special Visual Effects for a Series			
2010	CSI: Crime Scene Investigation	"Family Affair"	Sabrina Arnold, Rik Shorten, Steven Meyer, Derek Smith, Christina Spring, Joshua Cushner, Thomas Bremer, Mark R. Byers, Zachariah Zaubi	CBS
2010	Caprica	"There Is Another Sky"	Gary Hutzel, Mike Gibson, Doug Drexler, Jesse Toves, Kyle Toucher, Pierre Drolet, Heather McAuliff, Derek Ledbetter, David R. Morton	Syfy
2010	Stargate Universe	"Air"	Mark Savela, Michael Lowes, Vivian Jim, Kodie MacKenzie, Andrew Karr, Alec McClymont, Brenda Campbell, Craig Van Den Biggelaar	Syfy
2010	Stargate Universe	"Space"	Mark Savela, James Kawano, Krista McLean, Luke Vallee, Jason Gross, Steve Garrad, Chris Derochier, Robert Bourgeault	Syfy
2010	V	"Pilot"	Andrew Orloff, Karen Czukerberg, Chris Zapara, Johnathan R. Banta, Steve Graves, Christopher Irving, Michael Cliett, Roberto Biagi	ABC
2010	Outstanding Special Visual Effects for a Miniseries, Movie or a Special			
2010	The Pacific	"Part 5"	John E. Sullivan, Joss Williams, David Taritero, David Goldberg, Angelo Sahin, Marco Recuay, William Mesa, Chris Bremble, Jerry Pooler	HBO
2010	Ben 10: Alien Swarm		Evan Jacobs, Sean McPherson, Andrew Orloff, Brent Young	Cartoon Network
2010	The Pacific	"Part 1"	John E. Sullivan, Joss Williams, David Taritero, Peter Webb, Dion Hatch, John P. Mesa, Jerry Pooler, Paul Graff	HBO
2010	Virtuality		Gary Hutzel, Mike Gibson, Andrew Karr, Ryan Schroer, Pierre Drolet, Heather McAuliff, Derek Ledbetter, Alec McClymont, Daniel Osaki	Fox
2011	Outstanding Special Visual Effects for a Series			
2011	Boardwalk Empire	"Boardwalk Empire"	David Taritero, Robert Stromberg, Brian Sales, Ahdee Chiu, Justin Ball, Richard Friedlander, J. John Corbett, Steven Kirshoff, Paul Graff	HBO
2011	The Borgias	"The Poisoned Chalice" / "The Assassin"	Bob Munroe, Doug Campbell, Bill Halliday, Juan Jesús García, Luke Groves, Seth Martiniuk, Blair Tennessy	Showtime
2011	Game of Thrones	"Fire and Blood"	Adam McInnes, Angela Barson, Lucy Ainsworth-Taylor, Rafael Morant, Henry Badgett, Damien Macé, Stuart Brisdon, Graham Hills	HBO
2011	Stargate Universe	"Awakening"	Mark Savela, Krista McLean, Craig Van Den Biggelaar, Adam de Bosch Kemper, Erica Henderson, Michael Lowes, Wes Sargent, Luke Vallee, Kodie Mackenzie	Syfy
2011	The Walking Dead	"Days Gone Bye"	Sam Nicholson, Jason Sperling, Kent Johnson, Kristin Johnson, Christopher D. Martin, Michael Enriquez, Anthony Ocampo, Michael Cook, Greg Nicotero	AMC
2011	Outstanding Special Visual Effects for a Miniseries, Movie or a Special			
2011	Gettysburg		J. David Everhart, Kent Johnson, Ethan Summers, Mike Yip, Jon Rhinehardt, Jason Korber, Jared Jones, Brent A. Steinberg, Max Poolman	History
2011	Mildred Pierce	"Part 5"	Lesley Robson-Foster, John Bair, Renuka Ballal, Nathan Meier, Constance Conrad, Marci Ichimura, Josephine Noh, Aaron Raff, Scott Winston	HBO
2011	The Pillars of the Earth	"Witchcraft"	Viktor Muller, Vít Komrzý, Paul Stephenson	Starz
2011	Sherlock: A Study in Pink		James D. Etherington, Danny Hargreaves	PBS
2012	Outstanding Special Visual Effects			
2012	Game of Thrones	"Valar Morghulis"	Rainer Gombos, Juri Stanossek, Sven Martin, Steve Kullback, Jan Fiedler, Chris Stenner, Tobias Mannewitz, Thilo Ewers, Adam Chazen	HBO
2012	Falling Skies	"Live and Learn" / "The Armory"	Andrew Orloff, Curt Miller, Roberto Biagi, Sean Tompkins, Barbara Genicoff, Jacob Bergman, Scott Fritts, Renaud Talon, Michael Kirylo	TNT
2012	Inside the Human Body	"Creation"	Philip Dobree, Sophie Orde, Dan Upton, Matt Chandler, Chris Rosewarne, Grant White, Jonas Ussing, Paul Herbert, Nick Ward	TLC
2012	Pan Am	"Pilot"	Matt Robken, Christopher D. Martin, Sam Nicholson, Diego Galtieri, Daniel Kumiega, Michael Cook, William L. Arance, Martin Hilke, Anthony Ocampo	ABC
2012	Once Upon a Time	"The Stranger"	Andrew Orloff, Laura Jones, Phil Jones, Jacob Bergman, Nathan Matsuda, Dale Fay, Dayna Mauer, Kevin Struckman, Sallyanne Massimini	ABC
2012	The Walking Dead	"Beside the Dying Fire"	Victor Scalise, Jason Sperling, Darrell Pritchett, Eddie Bonin, Valeri Pfahning, Spence Fuller, Martin Hilke, Michael Cook, Jon Rosenthal	AMC
2012	Outstanding Special Visual Effects in a Supporting Role			
2012	Boardwalk Empire	"Georgia Peaches"	David Taritero, Robert Stromberg, Richard Friedlander, Eran Dinur, David W. Reynolds, Matthew Conner, Austin Meyers, Jonathan Dorfman, Steven Kirshoff	HBO
2012	Bones	"The Twist in the Twister"	Christian Cardona, Andy Simonson, Buddy Gheen, Beau Janzen, Ulysses Argetta, Heather Fetter	Fox
2012	The Borgias	"The Choice"	Doug Campbell, Bill Halliday, Luke Groves, Kirk Brillon, Steve Gordon, Jim Maxwell, Irit Hod, Tim Sibley, Adam Jewett	Showtime
2012	Breaking Bad	"Face Off"	William Powloski, Greg Nicotero, Bruce Branit, Werner Hahnlein, Steve Fong, Sean Joseph, Matthew Perin	AMC
2012	Hemingway & Gellhorn		Chris Morley, Kip Larsen, Nathan Abbot, Chris Paizis	HBO
2012	Touch	"Pilot"	Tony Pirzadeh, Mark Spatny, Nicole Zabala, Christopher D. Martin, Kristin Johnson, Whitman Lindstrom, Diego Galtieri, Meliza Fermin, Anthony Ocampo	Fox
2013	Outstanding Special Visual Effects			
2013	Game of Thrones	"Valar Dohaeris"	Joe Bauer, Jörn Großhans, Doug Campbell, Steve Kullback, Stuart Brisdon, Sven Martin, Jabbar Raisani, Tobias Mannewitz, Adam Chazen	HBO
2013	Battlestar Galactica: Blood & Chrome		Gary Hutzel, Mike Gibson, David Takemura, Doug Drexler, David R. Morton, Kyle Toucher, Derek Ledbetter, Heather McAuliff, Jesse Siglow	Syfy
2013	Defiance	"Pilot"	Gary Hutzel, Mike Gibson, Doug Drexler, David R. Morton, Neal Sopata, Kyle Toucher, Sean M. Jackson, Douglas E. Graves, Derek Ledbetter	Syfy
2013	Falling Skies	"Worlds Apart"	Andrew Orloff, Curt Miller, Suzanne MacLennan, Leah Garner Orsini, Dan Keeler, Julian Fitzpatrick, James David Hattin, Dylan Yastremski, Graeme Baitz	TNT
2013	Hemlock Grove	"Children of the Night"	Chris John Jones, Jon Massey, Sean Tompkins, Sallyanne Massimini, Michael Kirylo, Jacob Long, Chris Barsamian, Colin Feist, Kyle Spiker	Netflix
2013	Last Resort	"Captain"	David Altenau, Tim Jacobsen, Tiffany Smith, Matt von Brock, Aldo Ruggiero, Bruce Coy, Ignacio Garcerón, Jason Fotter, Brian D. Williams	ABC
2013	Outstanding Special Visual Effects in a Supporting Role			
2013	Banshee	"Pilot"	Armen V. Kevorkian, Mark Skowronski, Jane Sharvina, Rick Ramirez, Jeremy Jozwik, Mike Oakley, Nick Sinnott, Gevork Babityan, Andranik Taranyan	Cinemax
2013	Boardwalk Empire	"The Pony"	Lesley Robson-Foster, Paul Graff, John Bair, Steven Kirshoff, Parker Chehak, Aaron Raff, Tim Van Horn, Gregory S. Scribner, Brian Sales	HBO
2013	The Borgias	"The Prince"	Wojciech Zielinski, J.P. Giamos, Gabor Kiszelly, James Chretien, Ahmed Shehata, Chris Ankli, Jordan Nieuwland, Adrian Sutherland, Amanda Hollingworth	Showtime
2013	Da Vinci's Demons	"The Lovers"	Kevin Blank, Simon Frame, Shalena Oxley-Butler, Jonathan Hodgson, Oliver Arnold, David Jones, Oliver Zangenberg, Ante Dekovic, Matt Conway	Starz
2013	Revolution	"Pilot"	Jay Worth, Mark Stetson, Elizabeth Castro, Eric Chauvin, Johnathan R. Banta, John Lindstein, Colin Feist, Alfredo Tognetti, Christopher Lance	NBC
2013	Vikings	"Dispossessed"	Dennis Berardi, Julian Parry, Bill Halliday, Wilson Cameron, Dominic Remane, Jim Maxwell, Ovidiu Cinazan, Maria A. Gordon, Mike Borrett	History
2014	Outstanding Special Visual Effects			
2014	Game of Thrones	"The Children"	Joe Bauer, Jörn Großhans, Steve Kullback, Adam Chazen, Eric Carney, Sabrina Christoforidis, Matthew Rouleau, Thomas Schelesny, Robert Simon	HBO
2014	Agents of S.H.I.E.L.D.	"T.A.H.I.T.I."	Mark Kolpack, Gary D'Amico, Sabrina Arnold, Tracy Takahashi, Jon Tanimoto, Kevin Lingenfelser, Matt von Brock, Tom Mahoney, Mitch Gates	ABC
2014	Almost Human	"Pilot"	Jay Worth, Robert Habros, Curtis Krick, Steve Melchiorre, Michael Cliett, Christopher Lance, David Beedon, Adam Stern, Jared Jones	Fox
2014	Cosmos: A Spacetime Odyssey	"The Immortals"	Rainer Gombos, Adica Manis, Natasha Anne Francis, Luke McDonald, Sam Edwards, Mike Maher, Dominique Vidal, Ryan Tudhope, Ergin Kuke	Fox
2014	The 100	"We Are Grounders, Part 2"	Andrew Orloff, Michael Cliett, Tyler Weiss, Graeme Marshall, Kornel Farkas, Chris Pounds, Andrew Bain, Mike Rhone	The CW
2014	Outstanding Special Visual Effects in a Supporting Role			
2014	Black Sails	"I."	Erik Henry, Paul Graff, George Murphy, Annemarie Griggs, Mitch Claspy, Jeremy Hattingh, Doug Hardy, Nick Hsieh, Steven Messing	Starz
2014	Da Vinci's Demons	"The Sins of Daedalus"	Tom Horton, Nicky Walsh, Paul Simpson, Gavin Gregory, Simon A. Mills, Louis Dunlevy, Paul Round, Stefan Susemihl, Alex Snookes	Starz
2014	Hawaii Five-0	"Ho'onani Makuakane"	Armen V. Kevorkian, Alexander Soltes, John C. Hartigan, Jane Sharvina, Rick Ramirez, Dan Lopez, Steve Graves, Andranik Taranyan, Chad Schott	CBS
2014	Mob City	"A Guy Walks Into a Bar"	Jason Sperling, Rich E. Cordobes, Michael Morreale, Michael Enriquez, Valeri Pfahning, William L. Arance, Megan Omi, Diego Galtieri, Franco Leng	TNT
2014	Vikings	"Invasion"	Dominic Remane, Dennis Berardi, Mike Borrett, Bill Halliday, Jim Maxwell, Ovidiu Cinazan, Maria A. Gordon, Jeremy Dineen	History
2014	The Walking Dead	"30 Days Without an Accident"	Victor Scalise, Darrell Pritchett, Matt Robken, Gary Romey, Martin Hilke, Diego Galtieri, Michael Cook, William L. Arance, Dylen Velasquez	AMC
2015	Outstanding Special Visual Effects			
2015	Game of Thrones	"The Dance of Dragons"	Steve Kullback, Joe Bauer, Adam Chazen, Jabbar Raisani, Eric Carney, Stuart Brisdon, Derek Spears, James Kinnings, Matthew Rouleau	HBO
2015	Agents of S.H.I.E.L.D.	"The Dirty Half Dozen"	Sabrina Arnold, Mark Kolpack, Gary D'Amico, Tracy Takahashi, Kevin Lingenfelser, Matt von Brock, Mitch Gates, Kevin Yuille, Briana Aeby	ABC
2015	Black Sails	"XVIII."	Erik Henry, Kevin Rafferty, Paul Stephenson, Annemarie Griggs, Mitch Claspy, Ken Mitchel Jones, Lari Karam, Whitman Lindstrom, Charles Baden	Starz
2015	The Flash	"Grodd Lives"	Armen V. Kevorkian, James Baldanzi, Keith Hamakawa, Jason Shulman, Stefan Bredereck, Kurt Smith, Lorenzo Mastrobuono, Andranik Taranyan, Gevork Babityan	The CW
2015	Vikings	"To the Gates!"	Mike Borrett, Bill Halliday, Julian Parry, Dominic Remane, Ovidiu Cinazan, Jeremy Dineen, Paul Wishart, Engin Arslan, Ken MacKenzie	History
2015	Outstanding Special Visual Effects in a Supporting Role			
2015	American Horror Story: Freak Show	"Edward Mordrake, Part 2"	Jason Piccioni, Justin Ball, Jason C. Spratt, Tim Jacobsen, David Altenau, Tommy Tran, Michael Kirylo, Matt Lefferts, Donnie Dean	FX
2015	Boardwalk Empire	"Golden Days for Boys and Girls"	Lesley Robson-Foster, Parker Chehak, Douglas Purver, Paul Graff, John Bair, Greg Radcliffe, Rebecca Dunn, Aaron Raff, Steven Kirshoff	HBO
2015	Gotham	"Lovecraft"	Tom Mahoney, Joseph Bell, Erin Perkins, Eric Deinzer, Sina San, Adam Coggin, Mark Anthony J. Nazal, Henrique Reginato, Errol Lanier	Fox
2015	Marvel's Daredevil	"Speak of the Devil"	David Van Dyke, Bryan Godwin, Karl Coyner, Steve J. Sanchez, Julie Long, Neiko Nagy, Moshe Swed, Kjell Strode, Pedro Tarrago	Netflix
2015	The Walking Dead	"Conquer"	Victor Scalise, Darrell Pritchett, Matt Robken, Gary Romey, Martin Hilke, Franco Leng, Dylen Velasquez, Michael Cook, William L. Arance	AMC
2016	Outstanding Special Visual Effects			
2016	Game of Thrones	"Battle of the Bastards"	Steve Kullback, Joe Bauer, Adam Chazen, Derek Spears, Eric Carney, Sam Conway, Matthew Rouleau, Michelle Blok, Glenn Melenhorst	HBO
2016	Black Sails	"XX."	Erik Henry, Terron Pratt, Ashley J. Ward, Jeremy Hattingh, Paul Stephenson, Aladino Debert, Greg Teegarden, Olaf Wendt, Yafei Wu	Starz
2016	The Man in the High Castle	"The New World"	Curt Miller, Jeff Baksinski, Terry Hutcheson, Sean Tompkins, Dan Kruse, Christina Murguia, Nate Overstrom, Jim Hawkins	Amazon
2016	Penny Dreadful	"And They Were Enemies"	James Cooper, Bill Halliday, Sarah McMurdo, Mai-Ling Lee, Greg Astles, Ricardo Gomez, Matt Ralph, Alexandre Scott, Kyle Yoneda	Showtime
2016	Vikings	"The Last Ship"	Dominic Remane, Bill Halliday, Michael Borrett, Paul Wishart, Ovidiu Cinazan, Jim Maxwell, Kieran McKay, Jeremy Dineen, Tom Morrison	History
2016	Outstanding Special Visual Effects in a Supporting Role			
2016	Sherlock: The Abominable Bride		Danny Hargreaves, Henry Brook, Dewi Foulkes, JC Deguara, Natalie Reid, Sara Bennett, Matias Derkacz, Neil Alford, Amy Felce	PBS
2016	Better Call Saul	"Fifi"	William Powloski, Eric Chauvin, Erin Kanoa	AMC
2016	11.22.63	"The Rabbit Hole"	Jay Worth, Ashley Mayse, Brendan Taylor, Winston Lee, Rob Del Ciancio, Rob Greb, Bruce Branit, Daniel Mellitz, Dominic Cheung	Hulu
2016	Hannibal	"Primavera"	Anthony Paterson, Robert Crowther, Thomas Plaskett, Jay Stanners, Rob Tasker, Terence Krueger, John Coldrick	NBC
2016	The Walking Dead	"No Way Out"	Victor Scalise, Matt Robken, Darrell Pritchett, David Alexander, Michael Crane, Chad Hudson, Staffan Linder, Sean Ritchie, Aldo Ruggiero	AMC
2017	Outstanding Special Visual Effects			
2017	Westworld	"The Bicameral Mind"	Jay Worth, Elizabeth Castro, Joe Wehmeyer, Eric Levin-Hatz, Bobo Skipper, Gustav Ahren, Paul Ghezzo, Mitchell S. Drain, Michael Lantieri	HBO
2017	American Gods	"The Bone Orchard"	Kevin Tod Haug, David Stump, Jeremy Ball, Bernice Charlotte Howes, Jessica Smith, Josh Carlton, Pierre Buffin, James Cooper, Aymeric Perceval	Starz
2017	Black Sails	"XXIX."	Erik Henry, Terron Pratt, Ashley J. Ward, Kevin Rafferty, Paul Dimmer, Yafei Wu, Martin Lipmann, Nicklas Andersson, David Wahlberg	Starz
2017	The Man in the High Castle	"Fallout"	Lawson Deming, Cory Jamieson, Casi Blume, Nick Chamberlain, David Andrade, Bill Parker, Justin Fox, Danielle Malambri	Amazon
2017	Vikings	"On the Eve"	Dominic Remane, Michael Borrett, Bill Halliday, Paul Wishart, Ovidiu Cinazan, Jim Maxwell, Kiernan McKay, Isabelle Alles, Tom Morrison	History
2017	Outstanding Special Visual Effects in a Supporting Role			
2017	Gotham	"Heavydirtysoul"	Thomas Mahoney, Matthew Wheelon Hunt, Alex Gitler, Sina San, Michael Capton, Jon Anastasiades, Ryan Bauer, Mark Anthony Nazal, Randy Little	Fox
2017	The Crown	"Windsor"	Ben Turner, Tom Debenham, Standish Millennas, Kim Phelan, Oliver Cubbage, Lionel Heath, Charlie Bennet, Stephen Smith, Carmine Agnone	Netflix
2017	Genius	"Einstein: Chapter One"	Eric Durst, Lenka Líkařová, Viktor Muller, Marek Ruth, Tomáš Kalhous, Lukáš Herrmann, Pavel Kolář, Petr Hastík, Vit Komrzý	Nat Geo
2017	The Handmaid's Tale	"Birth Day"	Brendan Taylor, Stephen Lebed, Leo Bovell, Martin O'Brien, Winston Lee, Kelly Knauff, Zach Dembinski, Mike Suta, Cameron Kerr	Hulu
2017	Taboo	"Episode 1"	Henry Badgett, Tracy McCreary, Angela Barson, Lucy Ainsworth-Taylor, Nic Birmingham, Simon Rowe, Alexander Kirichenko, Finlay Duncan, Colin Gorry	FX
2018	Outstanding Special Visual Effects			
2018	Game of Thrones	"Beyond the Wall"	Steve Kullback, Joe Bauer, Adam Chazen, Michelle Blok, Sam Conway, Ted Rae, David Ramos, Wayne Stables, Derek Spears	HBO
2018	Altered Carbon	"Out of the Past"	Everett Burrell, Tony Meagher, Joel Whist, Jorge Del Valle, Steve Moncur, Christine Lemon, Paul Jones, Antoine Monineau, David Zaretti	Netflix
2018	Lost in Space	"Danger, Will Robinson"	Jabbar Raisani, Terron Pratt, Marion Spates, Ashley Ward, Niklas Jacobson, Niklas Ström, Joao Sita, Juri Stanossek, Rafael Solórzano	Netflix
2018	Stranger Things	"Chapter Nine: The Gate"	Paul Graff, Christina Graff, Michael Maher, Fred Raimondi, Seth Hill, Joel Sevilla, Alex Young, Steven Michael Dinozzi, Caius Man	Netflix
2018	Westworld	"The Passenger"	Jay Worth, Jacqueline VandenBussche, Bruce Branit, Kama Moiha, Michelle H. Pak, Bobo Skipper, Niklas Nuyqvist, Nhat Phong Tran, Mike Enriquez	HBO
2018	Outstanding Special Visual Effects in a Supporting Role			
2018	The Alienist	"The Boy on the Bridge"	Kent Houston, Wendy Garfinkle, Tim Barter, Rasik Gorecha, Martin Lake, Doug Larmour, Alison Griffiths, Steve Murgatroyd, Harin Hirani	TNT
2018	The Crown	"Misadventure"	Ben Turner, Standish Millennas, Alison Griffiths, Matthew Bristowe, Iacopo Di Luigi, Garrett Honn, Charlie Bennett, Jenny Gauci, Carmine Agnone	Netflix
2018	Gotham	"That's Entertainment"	Thomas Mahoney, Mattew Hunt, Ryan E Bauer, Sina San, Sebastiano D'Aprile, Jon Anastasiades, Mike Brumit, Tim Withers, Randy Little	Fox
2018	The Handmaid's Tale	"June"	Stephen Lebed, Brendan Taylor, Kelly Knauff, Kelly Weisz, Kevin McGeagh, Anderson Leo Bovell, Winston Lee, Xi Luo, Cameron Kerr	Hulu
2018	Mr. Robot	"eps3.4_runtime-err0r.r00"	Ariel Altman, Lauren Montuori, Joe Gunn, John Miller, Brian Kubovcik, Luciano DiGeronimo, Lindsay Seguin, Greg Anderson, John-Michael Buban	USA
2019	Outstanding Special Visual Effects			
2019	Game of Thrones	"The Bells"	Joe Bauer, Steve Kullback, Adam Chazen, Sam Conway, Mohsen Mousavi, Martin Hill, Ted Rae, Patrick Tiberius Gehlen, Thomas Schelesny	HBO
2019	The Man in the High Castle	"Jahr Null"	Lawson Deming, Cory Jamieson, Casi Blume, Nick Chamberlain, Bill Parker, Saber Jlassi, Chris Parks, Brian Hobert, Danielle Malambri	Amazon
2019	The Orville	"Identity, Part 2"	Luke McDonald, Tommy Tran, Kevin Lingenfelser, Nhat Phong Tran, Brooke Noska, Melissa Delong, Brandon Fayette, Matt Von Brock, Joseph Vincent Pike	Fox
2019	Star Trek: Discovery	"Such Sweet Sorrow, Part 2"	Jason Michael Zimmerman, Ante Dekovic, Ivan Kondrup Jensen, Mahmoud Rahnama, Alexander Wood, Aleksandra Kochoska, Charles Collyer, Fausto Tejeda, Darcy Callaghan	CBS All Access
2019	The Umbrella Academy	"The White Violin"	Everett Burrell, Chris White, Jeff Campbell, Sebastien Bergeron, Sean Schur, Steve Dellerson, Libby Hazell, Carrie Richardson, Misato Shinohara	Netflix
2019	Outstanding Special Visual Effects in a Supporting Role			
2019	Chernobyl	"1:23:45"	Max Dennison, Lindsay McFarlane, Claudius Christian Rauch, Clare Cheetham, Laura Bethencourt Montes, Steven Godfrey, Luke Letkey, Christian Waite, William Foulser	HBO
2019	Catch-22	"Episode 4"	Matt Kasmir, Brian Connor, Dan Charbit, Matthew Wheelon Hunt, Alun Cummings, Gavin Harrison, Giovanni Casadei, Remi Martin, Peter Farkas	Hulu
2019	Deadwood: The Movie		Eric Hayden, David Altenau, Alex Torres, Joseph Vincent Pike, Ian Northrop, Christopher Flynn, David Blumenfeld, Matthew Rappaport, David Rand	HBO
2019	Escape at Dannemora	"Episode 6"	Steven Kirshoff, Joe Heffernan, John Bair, Djuna Wahlrab, Matthew Griffin, Shannen Walsh, Joseph Brigati, Vance Miller, Min Hwa Jung	Showtime
2019	Tom Clancy’s Jack Ryan	"Pilot"	Erik Henry, Matt Robken, Jamie Klein, Pau Costa Moeller, Bobo Skipper, Deak Ferrand, Crawford Reilly, Joseph Karsparian, Francois Lambert	Amazon

=== 2020s ===
Year	Program	Episode	Nominees	Network
2020	Outstanding Special Visual Effects			
2020	The Mandalorian	"Chapter 2: The Child"	Richard Bluff, Jason Porter, Abbigail Keller, Hayden Jones, Hal Hickel, Roy Cancino, John Rosengrant, Enrico Damm and Landis Fields	Disney+
2020	Lost in Space	"Ninety-Seven"	Jabbar Raisani, Terron Pratt, Marion Spates, Niklas Jacobson, Andrew Walker, Juri Stanossek, Dirk Valk, Blaine Lougheed and Paul Benjamin	Netflix
2020	Stranger Things	"Chapter Eight: The Battle of Starcourt"	Paul Graff, Gayle Busby, Tom Ford, Michael Maher Jr., Martin Pelletier, Berter Orpak, Yvon Jardel, Nathan Arbuckle and Caius Man	Netflix
2020	Watchmen	"See How They Fly"	Erik Henry, Matt Robken, Ashley J. Ward, David Fletcher, Mathieu Raynault, Bobo Skipper, Ahmed Gharraph, Emanuel Fuchs and Francois Lambert	HBO
2020	Westworld	"Crisis Theory"	Jay Worth, Martin Hernblad, Jeremy Fernsler, Nhat Phong Tran, Joe Wehmeyer, Bruce Branit, Octevia Robertson, Jacqueline VandenBussche and Sebastiano D’Aprile	HBO
2020	Outstanding Special Visual Effects in a Supporting Role			
2020	Vikings	"The Best Laid Plans"	Dominic Remane, Bill Halliday, Becca Donohue, Leann Harvey, Tom Morrison, Ovidiu Cinazan, Jim Maxwell, Ezra Wadell and Warren Lawtey	History
2020	Devs	"Episode 8"	Andrew Whitehurst, Sarah Tulloch, Anne Akande, Sam Townend, Giacomo Mineo, Tom Hales, George Kyparissous, Stafford Lawrence and Jon Uriate	FX
2020	The Handmaid's Tale	"Household"	Stephen Lebed, Brendan Taylor, Leo Bovell, Rob Greb, Gwen Zhang, Marlis Coto, Stephen Wagner, Josh Clark and James Minett	Hulu
2020	Tales from the Loop	"Loop"	Andrea Knoll, Ashley Bernes, Eduardo Anton, Julien Hery, Laurent Pancaccini, Andrew Kowbell, Alan Scott, David Piombino and Rajesh Kaushik	Amazon Prime Video
2020	Tom Clancy’s Jack Ryan	"Strongman"	Erik Henry, Juliette Yager, Peter Crossman, Pau Costa, Paige Prokop, Deak Ferrand, Francois Lambert, Jesper Kjolsrud and Richard Vosper-Carey	Amazon Prime Video
2021	Outstanding Special Visual Effects in a Season or a Movie			
2021	The Mandalorian		Joe Bauer, Richard Bluff, Abbigail Keller, Hal Hickel, Roy K. Cancino, John Knoll, Enrico Damm, John Rosengrant and Joseph Kasparian	Disney+
2021	The Boys		Stephan Fleet, Shalena Oxley-Butler, Kat Greene, Rian McNamara, Tony Kenny, Steve Moncur, Julian Hutchens, Anthony Paterson and Keith Sellers	Prime Video
2021	The Falcon and the Winter Soldier		Eric Leven, Mike May, John Haley, Daniel Mellitz, Chris Waegner, Charles Tait, Sébastien Francoeur, Chris Morley and Mark LeDoux	Disney+
2021	Lovecraft Country		Kevin Blank, Robin Griffin, Francois Dumoulin, Pietro Ponti, Grant Walker, J. D. Schwalm, Robert C. Rhodes, Kevin McCalister and Paige Prokop	HBO
2021	WandaVision		Tara DeMarco, James Alexander, Sarah Eim, Sandra Balej, David Allen, Marion Spates, Steve Moncur, Julien Hery and Ryan Freer	Disney+
2021	Outstanding Special Visual Effects in a Single Episode			
2021	Star Trek: Discovery	"Su'Kal"	Jason Michael Zimmerman, Ante Dekovic, Aleksandra Kochoska, Charles Collyer, Alexander Wood, Ivan Kondrup Jensen, Kristen Prahl, Toni Pykalaniemi and Leslie Chung	Paramount+
2021	The Crown	"Gold Stick"	Ben Turner, Reece Ewing, Andrew Scrase, Standish Millennas, Oliver Bersey, Jonathan Wood, David Fleet, Joe Cork and Garrett Honn	Netflix
2021	The Nevers	"Ignition"	Johnny Han, Jack Geist, Justin Mitchell, Dominique Vidal, Emanuel Fuchs, Gaia Bussolati, Alexandre Prod'homme, Takashi Takeoka and Mike Dawson	HBO
2021	The Umbrella Academy	"743"	Everett Burrell, Phillip Hoffman, Jesse Kawzenuk, Christopher Stack, Sophie Vertigan, Jeff Campbell, Laurent Spillemaecker, R. Christopher White and Ryan Freer	Netflix
2021	Vikings	"The Signal"	Dominic Remane, Bill Halliday, Leann Harvey, Becca Donohoe, Tom Morrison, Ovidiu Cinazan, Jim Maxwell, Kieran McKay and Warren Lawtey	Prime Video
2022	Outstanding Special Visual Effects in a Season or a Movie			
2022	The Book of Boba Fett		Richard Bluff, Abbigail Keller, Paul Kavanagh, Cameron Neilson, Scott Fisher, John Rosengrant, Enrico Damm, Robin Hackl and Landis Fields	Disney+
2022	Foundation		Chris MacLean, Addie Manis, Mike Enriquez, Victoria Keeling, Chris Keller, Jess Brown, Nicholas Hernandez and Richard Clegg	Apple TV+
2022	Lost in Space		Jabbar Raisani, Terron Pratt, Troy Davis, Dirk Valk, Jed Glassford, Niklas Jacobson, Juri Stanossek, Jared Higgins and Paul Benjamin	Netflix
2022	Stranger Things		Michael Maher Jr., Marion Spates, Jabbar Raisani, Terron Pratt, Ashley J. Ward, Julien Hery, Niklas Jacobson, Manolo Mantero and Neil Eskuri	Netflix
2022	The Witcher		Dadi Einarsson, Gavin Round, Bruno Baron, Matthias Bjarnason, Sebastien Francoeur, Aleksandar Pejic, Oliver Cubbage, Mateusz Tokarz and Stefano Pepin	Netflix
2022	Outstanding Special Visual Effects in a Single Episode			
2022	Squid Game	"VIPs"	Cheong Jai-hoon, Kang Moon-jung, Kim Hye-jin, Jo Hyun-jin, Kim Seong-cheol, Lee Jae-bum, Shin Min-soo, Seok Jong-yeon and Jun Sung-man	Netflix
2022	The Man Who Fell to Earth	"Hallo, Spaceboy"	Jason Michael Zimmerman, Aleksandra Kochoska, Shawn Ewashko, Simon Carr, Elizabeth Alvarez, Richard R Reed, Jesper Kjolsrud, Anna James and Neal Champion	Showtime
2022	See	"Rock-a-Bye"	Chris Wright, Parker Chehak, Scott Riopelle, Javier Roca, Tristan Zerafa, Nathan Overstrom, Sam O'Hare, Tony Kenny and Tamriko Bardo	Apple TV+
2022	Snowpiercer	"A Beacon for Us All"	Geoff Scott, Darren Bell, Chris Ryan, Christine Galvan, Anita Milias, Jordan Acomba, Jason Snea, Hannes Poser and Jamie Barty	TNT
2022	Vikings: Valhalla	"The Bridge"	Ben Mossman, Melanie Callaghan, Vishal Rustgi, Troy Tylka, Mina Gaued, Jorge Perez, Liz Sui, Blayke Nadeau and Summer Zong	Netflix
2023	Outstanding Special Visual Effects in a Season or a Movie			
2023	The Last of Us		Alex Wang, Sean Nowlan, Joel Whist, Stephen James, Nick Marshall, Simon Jung, Dennis Yoo, Espen Nordahl and Jonathan Mitchell	HBO
2023	Andor		Mohen Leo, TJ Falls, Richard Van Den Bergh, Neal Scanlan, Liyana Mansor, Scott Pritchard, Joseph Kasparian, Jelmer Boskma and Jean-Clément Soret	Disney+
2023	House of the Dragon		Angus Bickerton, Nikeah Forde, Thomas Horton, Sven Martin, Mark Spindler, Mike Dawson, Sebastian Meszmann, Mike Bell and Tobias Graa Winblad	HBO
2023	The Lord of the Rings: The Rings of Power		Ron Ames, Jason Smith, Nigel Sumner, Ara Khanikian, Dean Clarke, Ken McGaugh, Tom Proctor, Greg Butler and Joe Henderson	Prime Video
2023	The Mandalorian		Grady Cofer, Abbigail Keller, Paul Kavanagh, Cameron Neilson, Scott Fisher, Hal Hickel, J. Alan Scott, Victor Schutz IV and Bobo Skipper	Disney+
2023	Outstanding Special Visual Effects in a Single Episode			
2023	Five Days at Memorial	"Day Two"	Eric Durst, Matthew Whelan, Danny McNair, Goran Pavles, Rafael Solórzano, John MacGillivray, Viktor Muller, Manuel Tausch and Gonzalo Escudero	Apple TV+
2023	The Nevers	"It's a Good Day"	Johnny Han, Jack Geist, Damon Fecht, Alexandre Prod'homme, Emanuel Fuchs, Gaia Bussolati, Ed Bruce, Brian Ali Harding and Takashi Takeoka	Tubi
2023	Shadow and Bone	"Rusalye"	Ante Dekovic, Helen Jen, Richard Macks, Gergely Galisz, Juri Stanossek, Adam Balentine, Jane Byrne, Håvard Munkejord and Angel Rico	Netflix
2023	Ted Lasso	"Mom City"	James MacLachlan, Bill Parker, Lenny Wilson, Gretchen Bangs, Brian Hobert, Shiying Li, Kenneth Armstrong, Ying Lin and Neil Taylor	Apple TV+
2023	The Umbrella Academy	"Marigold"	Everett Burrell, Phillip Hoffman, Dave Axford, Maria Sartzetaki, Sophie Vertigan, Jeff Campbell, Laurent Spillemaecker, R. Christopher White and Ryan Freer	Netflix
2023	Wednesday	"A Murder of Woes"	Tom Turnbull, Kent Johnson, Jesse Kawzenuk, Oana Barden, Craig Calvert, Ed Englander, John Coldrick, Brodie McNeill and Jason Troughton	Netflix
2024	Outstanding Special Visual Effects in a Season or a Movie			
2024	Shōgun		Michael Cliett, Melody Mead, Jed Glassford, Cameron Waldbauer, Philip Engström, Chelsea Mirus, Ed Bruce, Nicholas Murphy and Kyle Rottman	FX
2024	Ahsoka		Richard Bluff, Jakris Smittant, Paul Kavanagh, TC Harrison, Scott Fisher, Enrico Damm, Justin van der Lek, Rick O'Connor and J. Alan Scott	Disney+
2024	Avatar: The Last Airbender		Marion Spates, Jabbar Raisani, Adam Chazen, Niklas Jacobson, Nick Crew, Emanuel Fuchs, Khalid Almeerani, Ross Wilkinson and Thomas Schelesny	Netflix
2024	Fallout		Jay Worth, Andrea Knoll, Grant Everett, Jill Paget, Jacqueline VandenBussche, Devin Maggio, Andreas Giesen, Ahmed Gharraph and Joao Sita	Prime Video
2024	Loki		Christopher Townsend, Allison Paul, Sandra Balej, Matthew Twyford, Christopher Smallfield, John William Van der pool, Steve Moncur, Julian Hutchens and Kevin Yuille	Disney+
2024	Outstanding Special Visual Effects in a Single Episode			
2024	Ripley	"III Sommerso"	John Bowers, Jason Tsang, Joseph Servodio, Maricel Pagulayan, Christopher White, Libby Hazell, Francois Sugny, Gaia Bussolati and Pepe Valencia	Netflix
2024	All the Light We Cannot See	"Episode 4"	Charlie Lehmer, Swen Gillberg, Viet Luu, Tessa Roehl, Paolo Acri, Harry Bardak, Sylvain Theroux, John Britto and Laurence Berkani	Netflix
2024	The Crown	"Dis-Moi Oui"	Ben Turner, Reece Ewing, Oliver Bersey, Julia Stannard, Joe Cork, Tim Zaccheo, Aurélien Ronceray, Joseph Dymond and Elena Pagliei	Netflix
2024	True Detective: Night Country	"Part 1"	Barney Curnow, Jan Guilfoyle, Eggert "Eddi" Ketilsson, Simon Stanley-Clamp, Manuel Reyes Halaby, Tiago Faria, Panos Theodoropoulos, Cale Pugh and Tim Zaccheo	HBO
2024	Winning Time: The Rise of the Lakers Dynasty	"Beat L.A."	Raymond McIntyre Jr., Victor DiMichina, Damien Stantina and Javier Menéndez Platas	HBO
2025	Outstanding Special Visual Effects in a Season or a Movie			
2025	Andor		Mohen Leo, TJ Falls, Luke Murphy, Neal Scanlan, Scott Pritchard, Joseph Kasparian, Sue Rowe, Paolo D'Arco and Jean-Clément Soret	Disney+
2025	Dune: Prophecy		Terron Pratt, Michael Enriquez, Brennan Prevatt, Martyn Culpitt, Philip Engström, Peter Lames, Julien Hery, Vincent Poitras and Jed Glassford	HBO
2025	House of the Dragon		Daði Einarsson, Lev Kolobov, Thomas Horton, Mike Dawson, Sven Martin, Fausto Tejeda, Wayne Taz Stables, Marcus Goodwin and Martin Pelletier	HBO
2025	The Last of Us		Alex Wang, Fiona Campbell Westgate, Jed Glassford, Joel Whist, Stephen James, Nick Epstein, Dennis Yoo, Philip Engström and Andreas Giesen	HBO
2025	The Lord of the Rings: The Rings of Power		Jason Smith, Tim Keene, Ann Podlozny, James Yeoman, Daniele Bigi, Greg Butler, Ara Khanikian, Laurens Ehrmann and Ryan Conder	Prime Video
2025	Outstanding Special Visual Effects in a Single Episode			
2025	The Penguin	"Bliss"	Johnny Han, Michelle Rose, Alexandre Prod'homme, Erin Sullivan, Goran Pavles, Emanuel Fuchs, Ed Bruce, Nathaniel Larouche and Adrien Saint Girons	HBO
2025	Black Mirror	"USS Callister: Into Infinity"	James MacLachlan, Josie Henwood, Kübra Tanyel, David Schneider, Tallulah Baker, Jane Paton, Jonathan Caruana, Filip Latal and Jamie Wood	Netflix
2025	The Residence	"The Fall of the House of Usher"	Seth Hill, Tesa Kubicek, John Nelson, Ryan Urban, Phillip Moses, Brandon Nelson, Spencer Hecox, Gabriel Vargas and Burke Roane	Netflix
2025	Severance	"Hello, Ms. Cobel"	Eric Leven, Sean Findley, Shawn Hillier, Radost Ridlen, Martin Kolejak, Brian Holligan, Alex Lemke, Michael Huber and Djuna Wahlrab	Apple TV+
2025	The Umbrella Academy	"End of the Beginning"	Everett Burrell, Sabrina Arnold, Sophie Vertigan, Laurent Spillemaecker, Gabriel Beauvais, Maria Saade, Pier-Olivier Allard, Ryan Freer and Jeff Campbell	Netflix
2026	Outstanding Special Visual Effects in a Season or a Movie			
2026	Stranger Things		Betsy Paterson, Michael Maher, Sean Ames, Craig Seitz, Tessa Roehl, Chloe Lipp, Brad Tobler, Martin Hill, Richard Thwaites, Bill Georgiou, Jessica Smith and Mark Hawker	Netflix
2026	Alien: Earth		Jonathan Rothbart, James Ledwell, Mitchell Callisch, Woei Lee, David Fletcher, Jeffrey A. Okun, Chris Ritvo, Viktor Müller, Aladino Debert, Will Towle, Ryan Freer and Maksim Došlo	FX
2026	Foundation		Chris MacLean, Jack Geist, Gabriel Sanchez, Stephan Schaefholz, Arnaud Brisebois, Carlos Monzon, Mathieu Assemat, Stephen Elphick, Jindřich Červenka, Damien Hurgon, Ed Bruce and Jan Rejnuš	Apple TV
2026	It: Welcome to Derry		Daryl Sawchuk, Steve Dellerson, Pier Lefebvre, Jordan Schilling, Steven Tether, Darcy Callaghan, Zena Bielewicz, Eric Withee, Maria Sartzetaki, Sebastien Chartier, Ben King and Lara Ramirez	HBO
2026	Monarch: Legacy of Monsters		Sean Konrad, Elizabeth Willaman, Bryn Morrow, Marc Varisco, Bryan Hirota, Pier Lefebvre, Cody Baker, Julian Summers, Kelly Redmond, Jeremy Burns, Lara Bannister and Jourdan Biziou	Apple TV
2026	Prehistoric Planet: Ice Age		Russell Dodgson, Andrew R. Jones, Rupert Smith, Tracey Gibbons, Benjamin Loch, Francois Dumoulin, Romain Rico, Gavin McKenzie, Brian Fisher, Alvise Avati, Adrien Annesley and Liam Russell	Apple TV
2026	Outstanding Special Visual Effects in a Single Episode			
2026	Spider-Noir	"Nightmare on a Gurney"	Hnedel Maximore, Brooke Noska, Adam Rothstein, Timothy Hanson, Jorge Macias, Taylor Faulkinberry, Joseph C Bond IV, Suzie Askham, Tommy Tran, Cameron Neilson, Adam Balentine and Sebastiano D'Aprile	MGM+ / Prime Video
2026	Gen V	"New Year, New U"	Karen Heston, Sean Tompkins, Clara Hill, Dane Collier, Andrew Simmonds, Oliver Eikhoff, Matthew Novak, Bhanu Prakash and Hudson Kenny	Prime Video
2026	A Knight of the Seven Kingdoms	"In the Name of the Mother"	Arron Roebuck, Paul Russo, Luke Dhand, Angel Rico Riesgo, Sonsoles L. Aranguren, Rocío Ruiz de Azúa, Mike Dawson, Tom Lloyd and Paul Tuersley	HBO
2026	Paradise	"Exodus"	John Weckworth, John Stewart, Chapel Folger, John Brennick, Evan Underwood, Christian Day, Chris Messineo, Scott Gastellu, Linda Tremblay, Meliza Fermin, Kristofer Cross and Blair Foord	Hulu
2026	The Walking Dead: Daryl Dixon	"Costa da Morte"	Jao M'Changama, Justine Paynat-Sautivet, Sébastien Voisin, Tim Binmoeller, Vanya Karamehmedović, Xavier Allard, Cem Olcer, Mathieu Legros, Mathieu Malard, Pau Costa, Brett Tierney and Keith Pullman	AMC

== Programs with multiple awards ==
7 awards

- Game of Thrones

3 awards

- Star Trek: The Next Generation
- Star Trek: Voyager

2 awards

- Battlestar Galactica
- Boardwalk Empire
- The Mandalorian
- Star Trek: Enterprise

== Programs with multiple nominations ==
9 nominations

- Star Trek: Voyager

8 nominations

- Game of Thrones
- Stargate SG-1
- Star Trek: The Next Generation

7 nominations

- Star Trek: Enterprise
- Vikings

6 nominations

- Battlestar Galactica
- Star Trek: Deep Space Nine

5 nominations

- The Walking Dead

4 nominations

- Black Sails
- Boardwalk Empire
- The Crown
- Star Trek
- Stranger Things
- The Umbrella Academy
- Voyage to the Bottom of the Sea

3 nominations

- The Borgias
- Gotham
- The Handmaid's Tale
- Heroes
- Lost in Space
- The Man in the High Castle
- The Mandalorian
- Stargate Universe
- Westworld
- The Young Indiana Jones Chronicles

2 nominations

- Agents of S.H.I.E.L.D.
- Andor
- Band of Brothers
- Da Vinci's Demons
- Falling Skies
- Foundation
- House of the Dragon
- The Last of Us
- The Lord of the Rings: The Rings of Power
- Lost
- The Nevers
- Nightmares & Dreamscapes: From the Stories of Stephen King
- Rome
- Sherlock
- Stargate Atlantis
- Star Trek: Discovery
- Tom Clancy's Jack Ryan
- The X-Files
