= Visual Effects Society Award for Outstanding Supporting Visual Effects in a Photoreal Episode =

Annual professional society award

The Visual Effects Society Award for Outstanding Supporting Visual Effects in a Photoreal Episode is one of the annual awards given by the Visual Effects Society, starting in 2004. While the award's title has changed several time within this period, the recipients have been television episodes and/or movies or specials with less prominent, more subtle visual effects work.

== Winners and nominees ==
=== 2000s ===
Outstanding Supporting Visual Effects in a Broadcast Program

Year	Program	Episode(s)	Nominees	Network
2004	Lost	"Pilot (Part 2)"	Kevin Blank, Mitch Suskin, Benoit Girard, Jerome Morin	ABC
2004	Clubhouse	"Spectator Interference"	Curt Miller, Jason C. Spratt, Doug Witsken, Mike Tonder	CBS
2004	Spartacus		Sam Nicholson, Eric Grenaudier, Anthony Ocampo, Tim Donahue	USA
2005	Lost	"Exodus: Part 2"	Kevin Blank, Mitchell Ferm, Eric Chauvin, John Teska	ABC
2005	Alias	"The Index"	Kevin Blank, Armen V. Kevorkian, Eric Chauvin	ABC
2005	Warm Springs		Camille Cellucci, Jonathan Keeton, Kirk Cadrette, John Baker	HBO
2006	ER	"Scoop and Run"	Sam Nicholson, Scott Ramsey, Adam Ealovega, Anthony Ocampo	NBC
2006	Alias	"Reprisal"/"All the Time in the World"	Kevin Blank, Jay Worth, Steve Fong, Kevin Kutchaver	ABC
2006	Commander in Chief	"The Wind Beneath Her Wings"	Mark Kolpack, Adam Ealovega, Mark Spatny, Michael Enriquez	ABC
2007	Rome	"Philippi"	James Madigan, Barrie Hemsley, Duncan Kinnaird, Gary Brozenich	HBO
2007	Drive	"The Starting Line"	Raoul Bolognini, Loni Peristere, Steven Meyer, Chris John Jones	Fox
2007	Grey's Anatomy	"Walk on Water"	Sam Nicholson, Scott Ramsey, Valeri Pfahning, Michael Enriquez	ABC
2007	Marie-Antoinette		Richard Martin, Pierre Raymond, Sébastien Rioux, Nadine Homier	
2007	Pushing Daisies	"Pie-lette"	Craig Weiss, Toni Pace Carstensen, Brian Vogt, Jimmy Berndt	ABC
2008	Fringe	"Pilot"	Kevin Blank, Jay Worth, Andrew Orloff, Barbara Genicoff	Fox
2008	Jericho	"Patriots and Tyrants"	Andrew Orloff, Blythe Dalton Klippsten, Chris John Jones, Michael Cliett	CBS
2008	Life	"Frozen Solid"	Anthony 'Max' Ivins, Jenny Foster, Danny S. Kim, Shawn Lipowski	NBC
2008	Pushing Daisies	"The Legend of Merle McQuoddy"	William Powloski, Elizabeth Castro, Melanie Rose Tucker, Eric Chauvin	ABC
2009	CSI: Crime Scene Investigation	"Family Affair" (Opening Sequence)	Rik Shorten, Steven Meyer, Derek Smith, Sabrina Arnold	CBS
2009	FlashForward	"No More Good Days"	Kevin Blank, Steven Meyer, Jonathan Spencer Levy, Andrew Orloff	ABC
2009	Kings	"Goliath"	Craig Weiss, Niel Wray, Brian Vogt, Ronald B. Moore	NBC
2009	Krupp: A Family Between War and Peace		Thomas Tannenberger, Olcun Tan, Shane Cook, Mark Kolpack	ZDF
2009	Lost	"The Incident"	Mitch Suskin, Eric Hance, Sean M. Scott, Samantha Mabie-Tuinstra	ABC

=== 2010s ===
Year	Program	Nominees	Network
2010	Boardwalk Empire	Robert Stromberg, David Taritero, Richard Friedlander, Paul Graff	HBO
2010	Human Target	Andrew Orloff, Raoul Bolognini, Nathan Overstrom, Charlene Eberle Douglas	Fox
2010	Lost	Adam Avitabile, Melinka Thompson-Godoy, Michael Capton, Michael Degtjarewsky	ABC
2010	The Walking Dead	Sam Nicholson, Jason Sperling, Kent Johnson, Christopher D. Martin	AMC
2010	Undercovers	Jay Worth, Andrew Waisler, Ron Thornton, Andrew Kramer	NBC

Year	Program	Episode(s)	Nominees	Network
2011	Game of Thrones	"Winter Is Coming"	Lucy Ainsworth-Taylor, Angela Barson, Ed Bruce, Adam McInnes	HBO
2011	Boardwalk Empire	"Georgia Peaches"	Richard Friedlander, Robert Stromberg, David Taritero	HBO
2011	Bones	"The Twist in the Twister"	Christian Cardona, Buddy Gheen, Beau Janzen, Andy Simonson	Fox
2011	Breaking Bad	"Face Off"	Bruce Branit, Werner Hahnlein, Greg Nicotero, William Powloski	AMC
2011	Pan Am	"Pilot"	Tavis Larkham, Christopher D. Martin, Sam Nicholson, Matt Robken	ABC
2012	Boardwalk Empire	"The Pony"	John Bair, Parker Chehak, Paul Graff, Lesley Robson-Foster	HBO
2012	Hawaii Five-0	"La O Na Makuahine "	Gevork Babityan, Jon Howard, Armen V. Kevorkian, Rick Ramirez	CBS
2012	Hell on Wheels	"Blood Moon"	Matt von Brock, Jason Fotter, Tim Jacobsen, Bill Kent	AMC
2012	Hemingway & Gellhorn		Nathan Abbot, Kip Larsen, Chris Morley, Chris Paizis	HBO
2012	The Men Who Built America	"Bloody Battles"	Glenn Allen, Matthew Conner, Eran Dinur, David W. Reynolds	History
2013	Banshee	"Pilot"	Armen V. Kevorkian, Mark Skowronski, Jeremy Jozwik, Rick Ramirez	Cinemax
2013	The Borgias	"Relics"	Wojciech Zielinski, Neishaw Ali, Bill Halliday, J.P. Giamos	Showtime
2013	Da Vinci's Demons	"Ho'onani Makuakane"	Kevin Blank, Simon Frame, Ante Dekovic, Oliver Arnold	Starz
2013	Hawaii Five-0	"La O Na Makuahine "	Armen V. Kevorkian, Alexander Soltes, Jane Sharvina, Andranik Taranyan	CBS
2013	Mob City	"A Guy Walks Into a Bar"	Jason Sperling, Michael Morreale, Valeri Pfahning, Michael Enriquez	TNT
2013	Moonfleet	"Episode 2"	Ed Bruce, Alan Collins, John O'Connell, Joseph Courtis	Sky One

Outstanding Supporting Visual Effects in a Visual Effects-Driven Photoreal/Live Action Broadcast Program

Year	Program	Episode(s)	Nominees	Network
2014	American Horror Story: Freak Show	"Edward Mordrake (Part 2)"	Jason Piccioni, Jason C. Spratt, Michael Kirylo, Justin Ball, Eric Roberts	FX
2014	Black Sails	"I."	Erik Henry, Annemarie Griggs, Paul Graff, George Murphy	Starz
2014	Crossbones		Kevin Blank, Ron Pogue, Andy Weder, Niklas Jacobson, Måns Björklund	NBC
2014	Penny Dreadful	"Séance"	James Cooper, Bill Halliday, Sarah McMurdo, Lorne Kwechansky	Showtime
2014	Ripper Street	"Whitechapel Terminus"	Ed Bruce, Alan Collins, Joseph Courtis, John O'Connell	Amazon

Outstanding Visual Effects in a Photoreal Episode

Year	Program	Episode(s)	Nominees	Network
2015	Vikings	"To the Gates!"	Dominic Remane, Bill Halliday, Paul Wishart, Ovidiu Cinazan, Paul Byrne	History
2015	Agent Carter	"Now is Not the End"	Sheena Duggal, Addie Manis, Richard Bluff, Jayesh Dalal, Kenneth C. Clark	ABC
2015	Black Sails	"XVIII."	Erik Henry, Annemarie Griggs, Kevin Rafferty, Aladino V. Debert, Paul Stephenson	Starz
2015	Daredevil	"Speak of the Devil"	Bryan Godwin, David Van Dyke, Karl Coyner, Julie Long, Johann Kunz	Netflix
2015	Penny Dreadful	"And They Were Enemies"	James Cooper, Bill Halliday, Sarah McMurdo, Mai-Ling Lee	Showtime
2016	Black Sails	"XX."	Erik Henry, Terron Pratt, Aladino V. Debert, Yafei Wu, Paul Stephenson	Starz
2016	The Man in the High Castle	"Fallout"	Lawson Deming, Cory Jamieson, Casi Blume, Nick Chamberlain	Amazon
2016	Penny Dreadful	"The Day Tennyson Died"	James Cooper, Bill Halliday, Sarah McMurdo, Mai-Ling Lee	Showtime
2016	Roots	"Part One"	Simon Hansen, Paul Kalil, Theo le Roux Preis, Wicus Labuschagne, Max Poolman	History
2016	Vikings	"The Last Ship"	Dominic Remane, Mike Borrett, Ovidiu Cinazan, Paul Wishart, Paul Byrne	History
2017	Black Sails	"XXIX."	Erik Henry, Terron Pratt, Yafei Wu, David Wahlberg, Paul Dimmer	Starz
2017	Fear the Walking Dead	"Sleigh Ride"	Peter Crosman, Denise Gayle, Philip Nussbaumer, Martin Pelletier, Frank Iudica	AMC
2017	Mr. Robot	"eps3.4_runtime-error.r00"	Ariel Altman, Lauren Montuori, John T. Miller, Luciano DiGeronimo	USA
2017	Outlander	"Eye of the Storm"	Richard Briscoe, Elicia Bessette, Aladino V. Debert, Filip Orrby, Doug Hardy	Starz
2017	Taboo	"Episode 1"	Henry Badgett, Tracy McCreary, Nic Birmingham, Simon Rowe, Colin Gorry	FX
2017	Vikings	"On the Eve"	Dominic Remane, Mike Borrett, Ovidiu Cinazan, Paul Wishart, Paul Byrne	History
2018	Tom Clancy's Jack Ryan	"Pilot"	Erik Henry, Matt Robken, Bobo Skipper, Deak Ferrand, Pau Costa	Amazon
2018	The Alienist	"The Boy on the Bridge"	Kent Houston, Wendy Garfinkle, Steve Murgatroyd, Drew Jones, Paul Stephenson	TNT
2018	The Deuce	"We're All Beasts"	Jim Rider, Steven Weigle, John Bair, Aaron Raff	HBO
2018	The First	"Near and Far"	Karen E. Goulekas, Eddie Bonin, Roland Langschwert, Bryan Godwin, Matthew James Kutcher	Hulu
2018	The Handmaid's Tale	"June"	Brendan Taylor, Stephen Lebed, Winston Lee, Leo Bovell	Hulu
2019	Chernobyl	"1:23:45"	Max Dennison, Lindsay McFarlane, Clare Cheetham, Paul Jones, Claudius Rauch	HBO
2019	The Crown	"Aberfan"	Ben Turner, Reece Ewing, David Fleet, Jonathan Wood	Netflix
2019	Living with Yourself	"Nice Knowing You"	Jay Worth, Jacqueline VandenBussche, Chris Wright, Tristan Zerafa	Netflix
2019	See	"Godflame"	Adrian De Wet, Eve Fizzinoglia, Matt Welford, Pedro Sabrosa, Tom Blacklock	Apple TV+
2019	Vikings	"What Happens in the Cave"	Dominic Remane, Mike Borrett, Ovidiu Cinazan, Thomas Grant Morrison, Paul Byrne	History

=== 2020s ===
Year	Program	Episode(s)	Nominees	Network
2020	The Crown	"Gold Stick"	Ben Turner, Reece Ewing, Andrew Scrase, Jonathan Wood	Netflix
2020	I Know This Much Is True	"Episode 1"	Eric Pascarelli, Keith Kolder, Ariel Altman	HBO
2020	Mrs. America	"Shirley"	Janelle Croshaw, Kaylie Whitcher, Leonardo Silva, Zena Bielewicz, Michael Innanen	FX
2020	Survive		Ariel Altman, Rae Welty, Caius Wong, Carl Fong	Quibi
2020	Vikings	"Best Laid Plans"	Dominic Remane, Bill Halliday, Thomas Grant Morrison, Ovidiu Cinazan, Paul Byrne	Amazon
2020	Warrior	"Learn to Endure, or Hire a Bodyguard"	Jonathan Alenskas, Leah Orsini, Nate Overstrom, David Eschrich	Cinemax
2021	See	"Rock-a-Bye"	Chris Wright, Parker Chehak, Javier Roca, Tristan Zerafa, Tony Kenny	Apple TV+
2021	9-1-1: Lone Star	"Hold the Line"	Brigitte Bourque, Tyler Deck, Jason Gottlieb, Josephine Noh, Elia Popov	Fox
2021	The Handmaid's Tale	"Chicago"	Brendan Taylor, Stephen Lebed, Kayla Cabral, Brannek Gaudet	Hulu
2021	The Mysterious Benedict Society	"A Bunch of Smart Orphans"	Philippe Thibault, Marie-Pierre Boucher, Alexis Belanger, Gabriel Beauvais	Disney+
2021	Squid Game	"VIPS"	Jaihoon Jung, Hyejin Kim, Hyungrok Kim, Sungman Jun	Netflix
2021	Sweet Tooth	"Sorry About All the Dead People"	Rob Price, Danica Tsang, Matt Bramante, Jayme Vandusen	Netflix
2022	Five Days at Memorial	"Day Two"	Eric Durst, Danny McNair, Matt Whelan, Goran Pavles, John MacGillivray	Apple TV+
2022	The Old Man	"Episode III"	Erik Henry, Matt Robken, Jamie Klein, Sylvain Théroux, J.D. Streett	FX
2022	See	"I See You"	Chris Wright, Parker Chehak, Tristan Zerafa, Oscar Perea, Tony Kenny	Apple TV+
2022	Severance	"Good News About Hell"	Vadim Turchin, Nicole Melius, David Piombino, David Rouxel	Apple TV+
2022	Vikings: Valhalla	"The Bridge"	Ben Mossman, Melanie Callaghan, Matt Schofield, Chris Cooper, Paul Byrne	Netflix

== Programs with multiple awards ==
2 awards

- Black Sails (Starz)

== Programs with multiple nominations ==
5 nominations

- Vikings (History/Amazon)

4 nominations

- Black Sails (Starz)
- Lost (ABC)

3 nominations

- Boardwalk Empire (HBO)
- Penny Dreadful (Showtime)

2 nominations

- Alias (ABC)
- The Crown (Netflix)
- The Handmaid's Tale (Hulu)
- Hawaii Five-0 (CBS)
- Pushing Daisies (ABC)
- See (Apple TV+)
