= KEDD =

KEDD may refer to:

- KEDD-LD, a low-power television station (channel 27, virtual 45) licensed to Lancaster, California, United States
- KEDD-TV, former television station (channel 16) licensed to Wichita, Kansas, United States
- KGBB, a radio station (103.9 FM) licensed to Edwards, California, United States, which used the call sign KEDD from November 1998 to September 2007
- A fictional radio station heard in the car at the start of 405 The Movie
