= Adam Chazen =

American special effects producer

Adam Chazen (born July 19, 1986) is an American special effects producer who has worked in television and film, and is best known for his work on the cable television series Game of Thrones, for which he has received five Emmy Awards.

Chazen grew up in Old Bridge Township, New Jersey and attended Cheesequake Elementary School and Carl Sandburg Middle School before graduating from Old Bridge High School in 2004. Building on an interest in film that started in middle school, Chazen initiated his career in TV and film by recording events at his high school. He attended Rowan University, earning a degree in radio, television and film from the school's College of Communication and Creative Arts. Rowan University recognized Chazen in 2013 as the recipient of its Distinguished Young Alumnus Award. In 2016, Chazen was inducted in his former high school's Hall of Fame in Old Bridge Township, New Jersey.

After graduating from Rowan in 2008, Before moving to Belfast, Northern Ireland, to work on Game of Thrones, Chazen had worked on the documentary Being Elmo: A Puppeteer's Journey, and the films Iron Man 2, Transformers, Yogi Bear and 2012, before moving to Belfast to work on Game of Thrones.

As a visual effects associate producer on Game of Thrones, he was part of the HBO team that won the Primetime Emmy Award for Outstanding Special Visual Effects in five consecutive years, from 2012 to 2016. In 2019, Chazen was nominated for another Emmy for the final season of Game of Thrones.
