= John Rosengrant =

American make-up and special effects artist

- Education: Louisiana State University
- Occupations: Make-up and special effects artist

John Rosengrant is an American make-up and special effects artist. He was nominated for an Academy Award in the category Best Visual Effects for the film Real Steel.

In addition to his Academy Award nomination, he won three Primetime Emmy Awards in the category Outstanding Special and Visual Effects for his work on the television programs The Mandalorian and The Book of Boba Fett. He founded the company Legacy Effects with Lindsay Macgowan, Shane Mahan and Alan Scott.

== Selected filmography ==
- Real Steel (2011; co-nominated with Erik Nash, Danny Gordon Taylor and Swen Gillberg)
