= Swen Gillberg =

American visual effects artist

- Occupation: Visual effects artist
- Years active: 1997-present

Swen Gillberg is an American visual effects artist, best known for his work with Digital Domain. He was nominated for two Academy Awards in the category Best Visual Effects for the films Real Steel and Free Guy.

== Selected filmography ==
- Red Corner (1997)
- Mystery Men (1999)
- Stuart Little (1999)
- Supernova (2000)
- Hollow Man (2000)
- Vanilla Sky (2001)
- XXX (2002)
- Pirates of the Caribbean: At World's End (2007)
- The Mummy: Tomb of the Dragon Emperor (2008)
- G.I. Joe: The Rise of Cobra (2009)
- Percy Jackson & the Olympians: The Lightning Thief (2010)
- Real Steel (2011; co-nominated with Erik Nash, John Rosengrant and Danny Gordon Taylor)
- Night at the Museum: Secret of the Tomb (2014)
- Furious 7 (2015)
- Captain America: Civil War (2016)
- Avengers: Infinity War (2018)
- Avengers: Endgame (2019)
- Free Guy (2021; co-nominated with Bryan Grill, Nikos Kalaitzidis and Dan Sudick)
- The Gray Man (2022)
- Deadpool & Wolverine (2024)
