= Adolf Schaller =

American visual artist (1956–2024)

Adolf Schaller (1956 – August 9, 2024) was an American visual artist known for his work for Astronomy. He was awarded a Primetime Emmy Award for Outstanding Special Visual Effects for his work on Carl Sagan's television series Cosmos. Schaller died on August 9, 2024, at the age of 68.
