= Real Steel =

2011 film by Shawn Levy

- Theatrical release poster
- Directed by: Shawn Levy
- Screenplay by: John Gatins
- Story by: Dan Gilroy; Jeremy Leven
- Based on: "Steel" by Richard Matheson
- Produced by: Don Murphy; Susan Montford; Shawn Levy
- Starring: Hugh Jackman; Dakota Goyo; Evangeline Lilly; Anthony Mackie; Kevin Durand
- Cinematography: Mauro Fiore
- Edited by: Dean Zimmerman
- Music by: Danny Elfman
- Production companies: DreamWorks Pictures; Reliance Entertainment; 21 Laps Entertainment; Montford Murphy Productions
- Distributed by: Walt Disney Studios Motion Pictures (Note: Distributed under the Touchstone Pictures banner.)
- Release dates: September 6, 2011 (Paris); October 7, 2011 (United States)
- Running time: 127 minutes
- Country: United States
- Language: English
- Budget: $110 million
- Box office: $300 million

Real Steel is a 2011 American science fiction sports film starring Hugh Jackman. Produced and directed by Shawn Levy, the film is based on the short story "Steel", written by Richard Matheson, which was originally published in the May 1956 edition of The Magazine of Fantasy & Science Fiction, and later adapted into a 1963 Twilight Zone episode. The story features a down-on-his-luck former boxer (Jackman), whose sport is now played by robots, as he and his son (Dakota Goyo) find an abandoned robot and train it to be a promising fighter. Evangeline Lilly, Anthony Mackie, and Kevin Durand star in supporting roles.

The film was in development for several years before production began on June 7, 2010. Filming took place primarily in the U.S. state of Michigan. Animatronic robots were built for the film, and motion capture technology was used to depict the rodeo brawling of the robots.

Real Steel was distributed worldwide by Walt Disney Studios Motion Pictures through the Touchstone Pictures label in the United States on October 7, 2011. The film has grossed $300 million at the worldwide box office and received mixed reviews from critics, who praised the performances and visual effects, but criticized the formulaic plot. The film was nominated for Best Visual Effects at the 84th Academy Awards.

== Plot ==
In the 2020s, boxing between human fighters has been replaced with robots. In Texas, former boxer Charlie Kenton owns the robot Ambush until it is destroyed in a fight against a bull belonging to promoter and carnival owner Ricky. Having bet money he did not have with Ricky that Ambush would win, Charlie absconds before Ricky can collect.

After the fight, Charlie learns his ex-girlfriend died, and he must attend a hearing about their 11-year-old son Max, whom he hasn't seen since birth. Max's maternal aunt Debra and her husband Marvin seek full custody. Charlie agrees to give up custody of Max for money, while Marvin negotiates that Charlie keeps custody for three months during their vacation.

Settling into a gym owned by Bailey Tallet, the daughter of Charlie's former boxing coach, Charlie uses half the money to acquire the once-famous World Robot Boxing (WRB) robot Noisy Boy. He and Max take Noisy Boy to Crash Palace, an underworld boxing arena run by his friend Finn, where Noisy Boy is destroyed against robot boxer Midas.

While searching for replacements in a junkyard and then sliding down a cliff, Max discovers Atom, an obsolete, dilapidated, but mostly intact sparring robot that breaks Max's fall and saves his life. Atom is designed to endure damage with a rare "shadow function" program, which mirrors and memorizes the handler's or opponent's movements.

Charlie pits Atom against the robot Metro at Max's request, and the junkyard bot surprisingly comes out on top. Max integrates Noisy Boy's voice command hardware with Atom and convinces Charlie to optimize Atom's movements. Altogether, Charlie's boxing experience and Atom's shadow function build a winning streak that leads to Charlie being offered a WRB fight between Atom and the national champion, Twin Cities.

The fight starts with Atom on the attack, but Twin Cities quickly takes the offensive. Charlie notices a hitch (a brief delay) whenever Twin Cities throws a right punch, and he exploits this to win by knockout. Elated by their success, Max challenges the undefeated fighting robot and Real Steel Champion of the World, Zeus. After the fight, Ricky and two henchmen attack Charlie for bailing earlier and rob him and Max of their winnings, prompting a defeated and dejected Charlie to return Max to Debra.

When Charlie tries to convince an upset Max that he is better off without him, the boy reveals that all he ever wanted was for him to fight for him and be there as a father. After Max leaves, Charlie returns to Tallet's Gym and talks with Bailey. She persuades him to reconcile with Max, and Charlie convinces Debra to allow Max to come to the fight he set up with Zeus.

As the fight begins, Zeus dominates the first round, but Atom manages to survive, stunning the audience. Ricky, who bet with Finn on Atom losing within the first round, tries to leave but is cornered by Finn and his bookmakers.

As the fight continues, Atom lands multiple punches and withstands further attacks but makes no definitive progress. Late in the fourth round, Atom's voice-response controls are damaged, forcing Charlie to fight Zeus with Atom's shadow function for the fifth and final round, in which Charlie wards off Zeus with a rope-a-dope tactic long enough to deplete its power core, allowing Atom to begin a counterattack against an exhausted Zeus. With Zeus' programmers unable to compensate, the designer, Tak Mashido, intervenes and controls Zeus manually.

Zeus is soundly beaten but narrowly avoids losing by knockout and wins by a judge's decision. Despite the match result and remaining undefeated, Zeus is left critically damaged, and Mashido's group is humiliated by the near-loss. The cheering crowd triumphantly labels Atom the "People's Champion."

== Cast ==
- Hugh Jackman as Charlie Kenton: A former boxer
- Dakota Goyo as Max Kenton: Charlie's son
- Evangeline Lilly as Bailey Tallet: A boxing gym owner and daughter of Charlie's former boxing coach
- Anthony Mackie as Finn: A friend of Charlie
- Olga Fonda as Farra Lemkova: Tak Mashido's partner
- Karl Yune as Tak Mashido: A robot fighting inventor and designer of Zeus
- Kevin Durand as Ricky: A negotiator and enemy of Charlie.
- Hope Davis as Debra: Max's aunt
- James Rebhorn as Marvin: Debra's husband and Max's uncle
- Gregory Sims as Bill Panner

== Production ==
=== Development ===
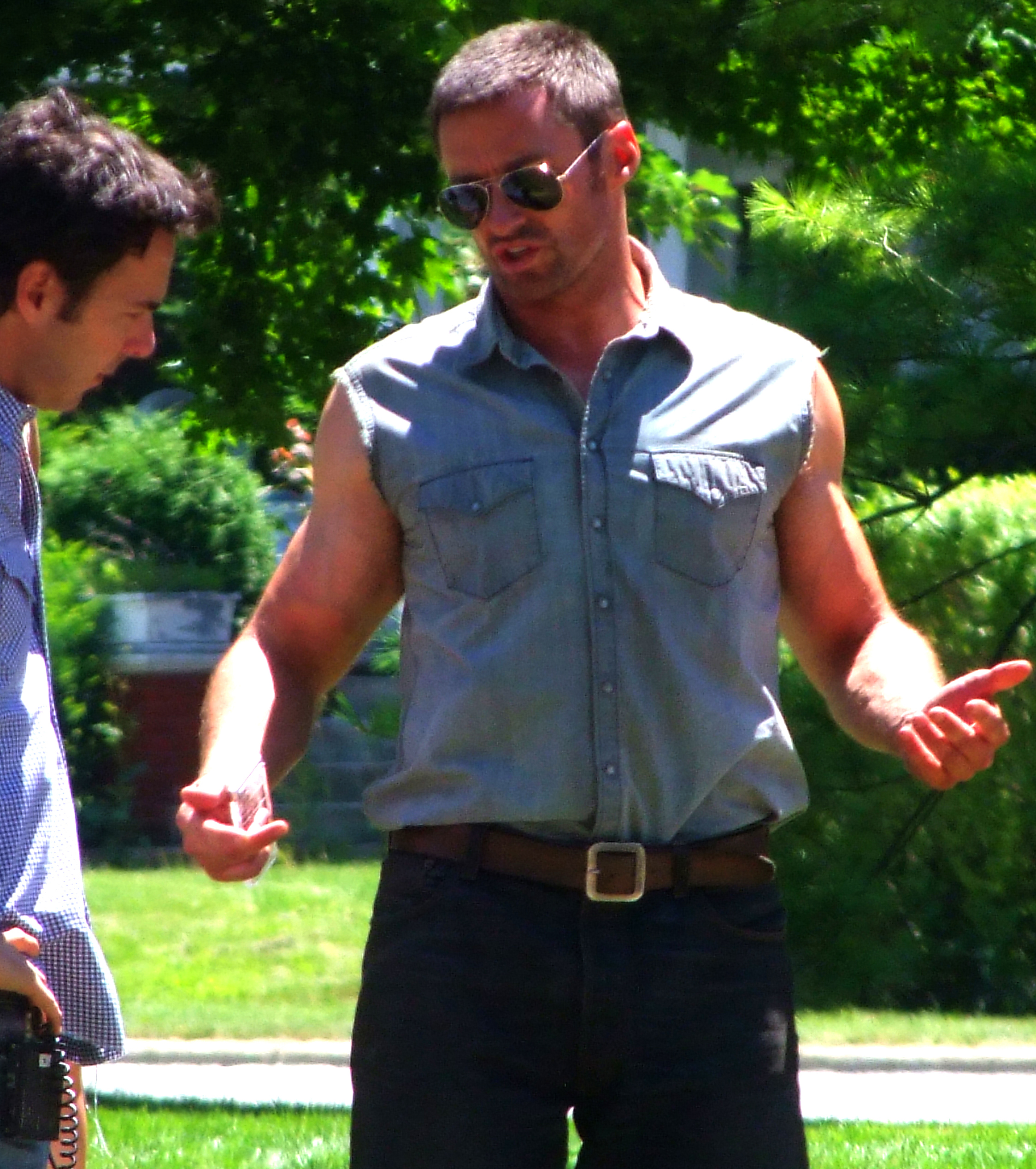
Director Levy on set with Jackman in July 2010

Based on Richard Matheson's 1956 short story "Steel", the original screenplay was written by Dan Gilroy and was purchased by DreamWorks for $850,000 in 2003 or 2005 (sources differ). The project was one of 17 that DreamWorks took from Paramount Pictures when they split in 2008. Director Peter Berg expressed interest in the project in mid-2009 but went no further. Levy was attached to the project in September 2009, and Jackman was cast in the starring role in November for a $9 million fee. In the same month, Steven Spielberg and Stacey Snider at DreamWorks greenlit the project.

Les Bohem and Jeremy Leven had worked on Gilroy's screenplay, but in 2009 John Gatins was working on a new draft. When Levy joined the project, he worked with Gatins to revise the screenplay, spending a total of six weeks fine-tuning the script. Advertising company FIVE33 did a two-hundred page "bible" about robot boxing. Levy said he was invited by Spielberg and Snider while finishing Date Night, and while the director initially considered Real Steel to have "a crazy premise," he accepted after reading the script and feeling it could be "a really humanistic sports drama."

=== Filming ===
Real Steel had a production budget of $110 million. Levy chose to set the film in state fairs and other "old-fashioned" Americana settings that would exude nostalgia and create a warm tone for the film's father-son story. There was also an attempt for the scenery to blend in new and old technology. Filming began on June 7, 2010, and ended by October 15, 2010. Locations include areas around Detroit, Michigan, and across the state, including at the Renaissance Center, the Cobo Arena, the Detroit Fire Department headquarters, the Russell Industrial Center, the Ingham County Courthouse in Mason, Michigan, the Leslie Michigan Railroad Depot, the former Belle Isle Zoo, and the Highland Park Ford Plant.

Jason Matthews of Legacy Effects, successor to Stan Winston Studios, was hired to turn production designer Tom Meyer's robot designs into practical animatronic props. He said, "We have 26-and-a-half total live-action robots that were made for this film. They all have hydraulic neck controls. Atom has RC [radio-controlled] hands as well." According to Jackman, executive producer Spielberg "actually said to Shawn, 'You should really have real elements where you can.' ... Basically if they're not walking or fighting, that's a real robot." Levy added that Spielberg gave the example of Jurassic Park, where Winston's animatronic dinosaurs "got a better performance from the actors, as they were seeing something real, and gave the visual effects team an idea of what it would look like."

As Real Steel was not based on a toy, Meyer said that "there was no guideline" for the robots, and each was designed from scratch, with an attempt to put "different personality and aesthetics," according to Levy. In Atom's case, it tried to have a more humanizing design to be an "everyman" who could attract the audience's sympathy and serve as a proxy to the viewer, with a fencing mask that Meyer explained served to show "his identity was a bit hidden, so you have to work harder to get to see him." Executive producer Robert Zemeckis added that the mask "became a screen so we can project what we want on Atom's face." Damage was added to the robots' decoration to show how they were machines worn out by intense battles.

For scenes when computer-generated robots brawl, "simulcam" motion capture technology, developed for the film Avatar, was used. As Levy described the process, "[Y]ou're not only capturing the fighting of live human fighters, but you're able to take that and see it converted to [CGI] robots on a screen instantaneously. Simulcam puts the robots in the ring in real time, so you are operating your shots to the fight, whereas even three, four years ago, you used to operate to empty frames, just guessing at what stuff was going to look like." Boxing hall-of-famer Sugar Ray Leonard was an adviser for these scenes and gave Jackman boxing lessons so his moves would be more natural.

== Music ==
Real Steel's soundtrack consists of 13 tracks featuring artists including Foo Fighters, Tom Morello, Eminem, Royce da 5'9" (Bad Meets Evil), Yelawolf, 50 Cent, and Limp Bizkit. Levy, a fan of The Crystal Method, invited that duo to contribute to the soundtrack; they recorded two new songs for it after viewing a rough cut of the film. The album was released by Interscope Records on October 4, 2011. The score album, Real Steel: Original Motion Picture Score consists of 19 tracks composed by Danny Elfman, and was released on November 8, 2011, in the US. Levy considered Elfman one of the few composers who could do a score similar to that of the Rocky franchise, alternating guitar-based ambient music and songs with a full orchestra.

== Release ==
Real Steel had its world premiere on September 6, 2011, in Paris at the Le Grand Rex. The film had its United States premiere on October 2, 2011, in Los Angeles at the Gibson Amphitheatre. It was commercially released in Australia on October 6, 2011, followed by the United States and Canada on October 7, 2011. Its U.S. release, by Walt Disney Studios Motion Pictures, was originally scheduled for November 18, 2011, but it was moved earlier to avoid competition with The Twilight Saga: Breaking Dawn – Part 1. The film was released in 3,440 theaters in the United States and Canada, including 270 IMAX screenings. There were also over 100 IMAX screenings in territories outside the United States and Canada, with 62 screenings on October 7.

=== Marketing ===
DreamWorks released the first trailer for Real Steel in December 2010 and it was attached to Tron: Legacy. In May 2011, DreamWorks released a second trailer. While the film features boxing robots, Levy said he wanted to show in the trailer "the father-son drama, the emotion Americana of it". He said, "We are very much the robo-boxing movie, but that's one piece of a broader spectrum." In addition to marketing trailers and posters, DreamWorks enlisted the British advertising company Five33 to build large physical displays representing the film as it had done for Pirates of the Caribbean: On Stranger Tides.

The studio also collaborated with Virgin America to name one of their Airbus A320s after the film, and one of the film's robots is pictured on its fuselage. On September 19, Jackman appeared on the weekly sports entertainment program WWE Raw to promote the film. In addition to Jackman making an appearance on the show, WWE named Crystal Method's "Make Some Noise" from the film's soundtrack as the official theme song for their returning PPV, Vengeance.

Jakks Pacific released a toy line with action figures based on Atom, Zeus, Blendo, Noisy Boy, Midas and Twin Cities. The company has also released a one-on-one, playset fighting game with robots in a ring. ThreeA released a line of high-end sixth-scale figures, as adapted by Australian artist Ashley Wood, based on Ambush, Atom, Midas, and Noisy Boy.

=== Video game ===
Jump Games released a fighting video game based on the film for Android and iOS devices, and Yuke's made a game for the PS3 and Xbox 360. An arcade game was also released by Innovative Concepts in Entertainment (ICE).

=== Home media ===
The film was released on DVD, Blu-ray, and both high-definition and standard-definition digital download in January 2012, from Walt Disney Studios Home Entertainment, under the Touchstone Home Entertainment label. Additional material includes Disney Second Screen; deleted and extended scenes with introductions by director Levy; and a profile of film consultant Sugar Ray Leonard.

== Reception ==
=== Box office ===
Real Steel earned $85.5 million in North America, and $213.8 million in other territories, for a worldwide total of $299.3 million. It had a worldwide opening of $49.4 million. In North America, it topped the box office with $8.5 million on its opening day and $27.3 million in total on its opening weekend, claiming the number one spot, ahead of the other new nationwide release, The Ides of March, and all holdovers. It managed first-place debuts in 11 countries including Hugh Jackman's native Australia ($4.2 million).

=== Critical response ===
On Rotten Tomatoes, the film has an approval rating of 60% based on reviews from 233 critics and an average rating of 5.91/10. The website's consensus is, "Silly premise notwithstanding, this is a well-made Hollywood movie: Thrilling and exciting action with just enough characterization." On Metacritic, the film has a weighted average score of 56 out of 100, based on reviews from 34 critics, indicating "mixed or average reviews". Audiences surveyed by CinemaScore during the opening weekend gave the film a grade A, on a scale from A+ to F.

Roger Ebert of the Chicago Sun-Times rated the film 3 stars out of 4, saying, "Real Steel is a real movie. It has characters, it matters who they are, it makes sense of its action, it has a compelling plot. Sometimes you go into a movie with low expectations and are pleasantly surprised." Lisa Schwarzbaum of Entertainment Weekly gave the film an A−, saying director Levy "makes good use of his specialized skill in blending people and computer-made imaginary things into one lively, emotionally satisfying story".

Claudia Puig of USA Today said, "Though the premise of fighting robots does seem a plausible and intriguing extension of the contemporary WWE world, Real Steel is hampered by leaden, clichéd moments in which a stubborn boy teaches his childish father a valuable lesson." James White of the UK magazine Empire gave the film 3 of 5 stars, saying, "Rocky with robots? It's not quite in Balboa's weight class, but Real Steel at least has some heft. There's barely a story beat among the beat-downs that you won't expect, and sometimes the saccharine gets in the way of the spectacle, but on the whole this is enjoyable family entertainment."

=== Accolades ===
Award	Nominee	Category	Result
Academy Awards	Erik Nash, John Rosengrant, Danny Gordon Taylor, and Swen Gillberg	Best Visual Effects	Nominated
People's Choice Awards	Hugh Jackman	Favorite Action Movie Star	Won
Young Artist Award	Dakota Goyo	Best Performance in a Feature Film – Leading Young Actor	Won
Saturn Award	Dakota Goyo	Best Performance by a Young Actor	Nominated

== Future ==
=== Potential sequel ===
In an interview on August 8, 2021, for his then-upcoming film Free Guy, Levy expressed interest in a Real Steel sequel reuniting both Jackman and Free Guy-star Ryan Reynolds, the latter of whom was introduced to Levy by Jackman.

In another interview on April 13, 2024, for Deadpool & Wolverine which stars both Reynolds and Jackman in their respective roles, Levy noted that he and Jackman still talk about a potential sequel at times, and he himself felt encouraged to do so thanks to the positive fan reception over the first film.

=== Television series ===
On January 14, 2022, it was reported that a series is in early development for Disney+.

== In popular culture ==
The Japanese Thoroughbred racehorse and sire Real Steel is named after the film.

== See also ==
- "Raging Bender", the 8th episode of the second season of Futurama also depicts a hidden human controller of a robotic boxer, likely a reference to Rock 'Em Sock 'Em Robots.
- "I, (Annoyed Grunt)-Bot", the 9th episode of the fifteenth season of The Simpsons is also based of the Richard Matheson story, although more faithful to the original.
- List of boxing films
