= Disney Second Screen =

Interactive computer and iPad app

- Original author: Walt Disney Studios; Home Entertainment
- Operating system: iOS, Web browser
- Available in: English
- Type: Entertainment
- Website: disneysecondscreen.com

Disney Second Screen was an interactive application, released on a computer (via Flash) or iPad (as native app). This app provides onscreen film feature accessible download that provided additional content, and user can views a film released by the Walt Disney Studios Home Entertainment. The movie linked with the viewer's device through an audio cue, a manual sync, or with a visual sync indicator. As the film plays on a viewer's television, interactive elements such as trivia, photo galleries, and animated flipbooks appeared on the iPad or computer screen.

== History ==
Disney Second Screen was released by Walt Disney Studios Home Entertainment in the Bambi Diamond Edition Blu-ray on March 1, 2011. The feature was included with the following home media releases:

- Bambi Diamond Edition Blu-ray on March 1, 2011.
- Tron: Legacy Blu-ray and DVD - April 5, 2011
- The Lion King Diamond Edition Blu-ray - October 4, 2011
- Pirates of the Caribbean: On Stranger Tides Blu-ray - October 18, 2011
- Real Steel Blu-ray - January 24, 2012 Branded as Real Steel Second Screen.
- Lady and the Tramp Diamond Edition Blu-ray on February 7, 2012.
- John Carter Blu-ray - June 5, 2012.
- The Avengers Blu-ray - September 25, 2012. Branded as Marvel Second Screen.
- Oz the Great and Powerful Blu-ray - June 11, 2013.
- Iron Man 3 Blu-ray - September 24, 2013. Branded as Marvel Second Screen.
- The Little Mermaid Diamond Edition Blu-ray - October 1, 2013

As of 2 October 2016, Disney had ceased support for this feature and removed the website. As of 30 August 2020, the original website re-directs to technical support, including a FAQ stating that the feature is no longer supported.

== Special Features ==
Special features for the Bambi Diamond Edition release include a Thumper flipbook, games, art galleries, videos, and trivia. The Tron: Legacy DVD and Blu-ray includes an interactive reel of images and a 3-D environment that can be explored using the touchscreen or the mouse. Similarly, the application on The Lion King Diamond Edition allows you to look at storyboards, concept art, and interactive games while the film plays. For the release of Pirates of the Caribbean: On Stranger Tides, Disney Second Screen allows you to look at concept art, time-lapse photography, and makeup tests. The Real Steel Second Screen includes stories and opinions from the filmmaker that expand the story. On the Lady and the Tramp Diamond Edition release, the Second Screen application includes storyboards, activities, and behind-the-scenes features. For Iron Man 3, the second screen app features the voice of actor Paul Bettany as JARVIS, who recorded more than 20 hours of original audio content specifically for the app.

== See also ==
- Second screen
