= Erik Nash =

- Occupation: Visual effects artist
- Years active: 1979-present

Erik Nash is a three time Oscar nominated visual effects artist.

In addition he has won two Emmys for his work on Star Trek: The Next Generation.

== Oscar history ==
All three are in the category of Best Visual Effects

- 77th Academy Awards-Nominated for I, Robot, nomination shared with Andrew R. Jones, Joe Letteri and John Nelson. Lost to Spider-Man 2.
- 84th Academy Awards-Nominated for Real Steel, nomination shared with Swen Gillberg, Danny Gordon Taylor and John Rosengrant. Lost to Hugo.
- 86th Academy Awards-Nominated for Iron Man 3, nomination shared with Dan Sudick, Christopher Townsend and Guy Williams. Lost to Gravity.
