= John Allison (special effects designer) =

American special effects designer

John Allison is an American special effects designer. He has worked on educational projects for PBS as well as science fiction and action series such as Sliders and V.I.P.

== Awards ==
=== Nominated ===
- 1989: Nominated to the Primetime Emmy Award for Outstanding Achievement in Special Visual Effects for the episode "The Geometry of Life" in the documentary TV series The Infinite Voyage

=== Won ===
- 1981: Primetime Emmy Award for Outstanding Individual Achievement in Creative Technical Crafts for premiere episode "The Shores of the Cosmic Ocean" in the documentary TV series Cosmos: A Personal Voyage. Shared with:
  - Adolf Schaller (astronomical artist)
  - Don Davis (astronomical artist)
  - Rick Sternbach (astronomical artist)
  - Jon Lomberg (astronomical artist)
  - Anne Norcia (astronomical artist)
  - Ernie Norcia (astronomical artist)
- 1985: Primetime Emmy Award for Outstanding Special Visual Effects (as director/designer/supervisor of visual effects) for the effects on the documentary TV series The Brain (aired 1983–1985).
