= Darrell Pritchett =

American special effects artist (1947–2025)

- Born: Darrell Dean Pritchett; September 19, 1947; Santa Monica, California, U.S.
- Died: December 19, 2025 (aged 78)
- Occupation: Special effects artist

Darrell Dean Pritchett (September 19, 1947 – December 19, 2025) was an American special effects artist. He was nominated for four Primetime Emmy Awards in the category Outstanding Special Visual Effects for his work on the television program The Walking Dead.

Pritchett died on December 19, 2025, at the age of 78.
