= 405 (film) =

2000 short film

- Film poster
- Directed by: Bruce Branit; Jeremy Hunt
- Written by: Bruce Branit; Jeremy Hunt
- Starring: Jeremy Hunt; Angela Burns; Erin Kotecki
- Music by: Wayne Boon
- Production company: Lucamax Pictures
- Release date: June 5, 2000
- Running time: 180 seconds
- Country: United States
- Language: English
- Budget: US$300

405 is a three-minute film released in June 2000. It was produced by Bruce Branit and Jeremy Hunt on a US$300 budget, using significantly self-taught skills with personal computers. 405 is also one of the earliest viral videos. It immediately became notable as an early example of the revolution in digital filmmaking and the use of broadband Internet as a channel to distribute media, and the results rival that of many major film and television production studios at the time.

== Plot ==
On an otherwise ordinary day in Los Angeles, air traffic controllers in contact with Airliner Air Flight 117 have the flight appear on a radar screen. The air traffic controllers instruct the McDonnell Douglas DC-10 airliner to make an emergency landing at Los Angeles International Airport.

The flight crew responds by saying that it is unable to maintain altitude, and begin an emergency descent. Meanwhile, during a traffic report, a man is driving a Jeep Grand Cherokee down a mysteriously empty stretch of I-405 as a two-mile stretch was shut down to be used as the airliner's emergency landing strip. Soon, Airliner Air Flight 117 appears on its final landing approach while the driver of the Jeep attempts to outrun the incoming DC-10.

During touchdown, the airliner's nose gear collides with the back of the Jeep with the nose gear collapsing, and the fuselage slamming onto the Jeep's roof. The two vehicles are locked together, pushing the Jeep to a much higher speed. The driver tries to slow the careening aircraft but in the process of slowing down, the DC-10 and the man's car narrowly miss an elderly woman driving slowly in her Lincoln Continental. While sliding to a stop, the massive airliner's wheels miss the Lincoln Continental, with the wing of the aircraft passing overhead.

The incident ends with police cars arriving; at that point, the elderly woman drives slowly past, extending her middle finger at the Jeep's driver.

== Production ==
The producers shot the film using a digital camcorder and created the special effects using personal computers, all on a budget of $300. Furthermore, $140 of the budget paid the fines of two traffic tickets for walking on the highway shoulder while filming, issued by California Highway Patrol Officer Dana Anderson, who is listed in the "Special Thanks" section of the credits.

405 includes both live action video and computer-generated imagery that took three and a half months to make. Before making 405, Branit and Hunt had already taught themselves the use of visual effects software, then worked for a few years as professional visual effects artists. Though Hunt had a degree in filmmaking, the use of digital effects software was not commonly taught in school at that time. They used a Canon Optura digital video camera. The effects were done on Pentium II and Pentium III computers with LightWave 3D, Digital Fusion, and Adobe Premiere.

The live action footage, consisting of the actors in stationary vehicles, was shot in one weekend with an hour of pick-up shots later. The post production and visual effects were completed later by the two filmmakers in their spare time. All of the shots outside of the Jeep are entirely computer generated three-dimensional models. The actors were shot in vehicles similar to the ones in the film but the exterior shots of the vehicles, the jet, the highway, and background scenery in the movie are composited from still photographs and video applied to three-dimensional digital models. About 50% of the shots in the interior of the Jeep are digital effects.

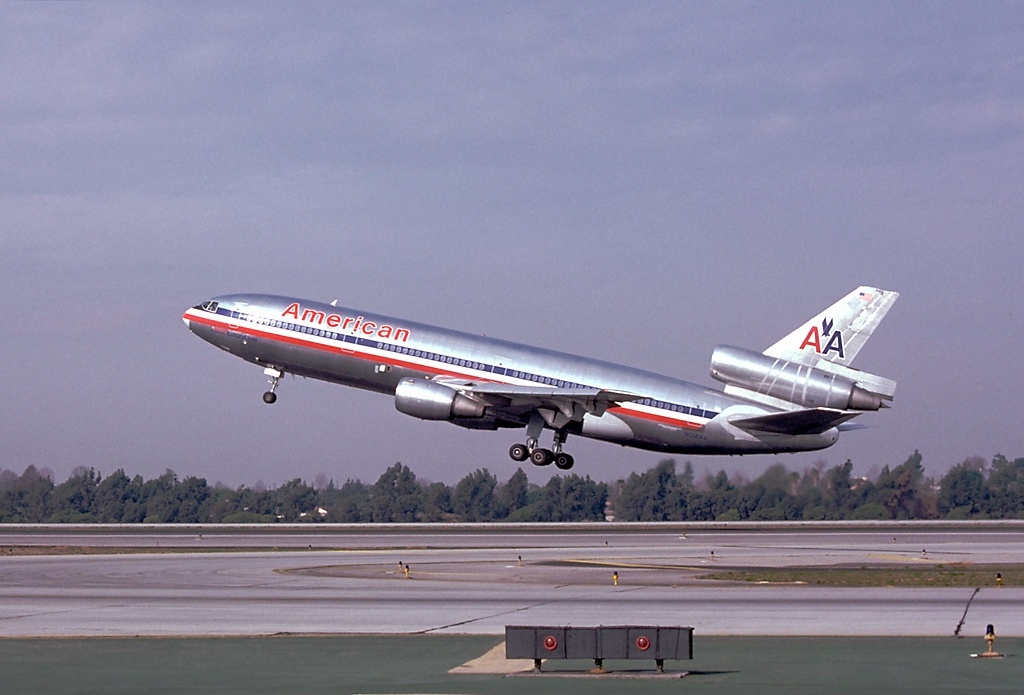
American Airlines DC-10

405 features a DC-10 in basic American Airlines colors, with the "American" title replaced with the word "Airliner". American Airlines was the launch customer for the DC-10. American operated 60 of the type, although by 2000, the airliner was being phased out of service although the last commercial DC-10 was finally retired in 2014 by Biman Bangladesh.

== Reception ==
With little promotional effort, and predating the existence of modern video streaming services such as YouTube, 405 soon reached millions of online viewers via Internet downloads. 405 initially launched on its own website, where it received more than 10,000 downloads in its first week online. By July, the film was featured on the site iFilm, and combined with exposure from their own site, viewers totaled two million views. As a result, Branit and Hunt signed a deal as directors with CAA as well as A Band Apart. They appeared on The Today Show, Access Hollywood, Roger Ebert, Extra, and many more news shows and publications.

Additionally, it became an instant media sensation. In the year it was released, film critic Roger Ebert referred to 405 as "the most famous short film in the history of the Internet". 405 won the Video Premiere Award DVD for Best Internet Video Premiere at the DVD Exclusive Awards 2001.
