= Armen V. Kevorkian =

Armenian-American visual effects supervisor and television director

- Other names: Armen Kevorkian
- Education: Columbia College Hollywood
- Occupations: Visual effects supervisor; Television director
- Years active: 1999–present

Armen V. Kevorkian is an Armenian-American visual effects supervisor and television director. He is best known for his work on television series such as Ghost Whisperer, Hawaii Five-0, Banshee, The Flash, Supergirl, and Legends of Tomorrow. His accolades include a Primetime Emmy Award, a Visual Effects Society Award, and eight Leo Awards.

== Career ==
=== Early career ===
Kevorkian began his career on Star Trek: Voyager, as a visual effects associate. He was with the series until its conclusion in 2001. He then merged to Star Trek: Enterprise, where he worked in effects for 70 episodes. He was then hired to coordinate visual effects for the two-part pilot of J. J. Abrams' Lost. He went on to work for Abrams again on the final season of Alias. His first job as a supervisor came with ABC's new fall 2005 series Invasion. He worked in that capacity until the series was cancelled after its second season. He would go on to work as a supervisor on such series as Studio 60 on the Sunset Strip, Brothers & Sisters, Ghost Whisperer, Weeds, GCB, Castle, Unforgettable, Political Animals, The Newsroom, Ray Donovan, Homeland, Hawaii Five-0, The Tomorrow People and Lab Rats, As well as the pilots for Reckless, The Lottery, and The Mysteries of Laura. He won a Primetime Emmy Award for Outstanding Special Visual Effects in a Supporting Role for his work on the Cinemax series Banshee.

=== Arrowverse ===
Having worked for prolific producer Greg Berlanti on Brothers & Sisters, The Tomorrow People, and Political Animals, Kevorkian joined him yet again for his new Arrow spin-off The Flash. Working on the series, he gained fame and recognition for his visual achievements. In 2015, Kevorkian boarded Supergirl, which was initially broadcast on CBS and not a part of The CW's Arrowverse. However, after the conclusion of the first season, the series moved to the sibling network. In 2016, Kevorkian began work on Berlanti's next addition to the universe Legends of Tomorrow. The same year, he made his directorial debut, helming The Flash's second-season episode, "Rupture". He most recently directed the third episode of the third season, "Magenta". He was nominated for a Primetime Emmy Award in 2015 for his work on the episode "Grodd Lives" of the series.

== Awards and nominations ==
Year	Award	Category	Nominated work	Result	Ref.
2013	Primetime Emmy Award	Outstanding Special Visual Effects In A Supporting Role	Banshee for "Pilot"	Won	
2014	Visual Effects Society Awards	Outstanding Visual Effects in a Visual Effects-Driven Photoreal/Live Action Broadcast Program	The Flash	Nominated	
2015	Leo Awards	Best Visual Effects in a Dramatic Series	The Flash for "Going Rogue"	Won	
2015	Primetime Emmy Award	Outstanding Special Visual Effects	The Flash for "Grodd Lives"	Nominated	
2016	Leo Awards	Best Visual Effects in a Dramatic Series	The Flash for "Gorilla Warfare"	Won	
2017	Leo Awards	Best Visual Effects in a Short Drama	Sidekick	Won	
2017	Leo Awards	Best Visual Effects in a Dramatic Series	The Flash for "King Shark"	Won	
2017	Leo Awards	Best Visual Effects in a Dramatic Series	Legends of Tomorrow for "Invasion!"	Nominated	
2018	Leo Awards	Best Visual Effects in a Dramatic Series	The Flash for "I Know Who You Are"	Won	
2019	Leo Awards	Best Visual Effects in a Dramatic Series	The Flash for "We Are the Flash"	Won	
2019	Leo Awards	Best Visual Effects in a Dramatic Series	Supergirl for "Call to Action"	Nominated	
