= Bruce Branit =

American film director

- Born: Kansas
- Occupation: Filmmaker
- Years active: 1989 - present
- Website: www.branit.com

Bruce Branit is an American filmmaker with a strong background in Computer graphics and visual effects. He has received eight Emmy Award nominations for his work on shows such as Westworld, Breaking Bad and Star Trek: Voyager. He is the owner of Branit FX based in Kansas City which provides visual effects work for feature television, film and commercials. His production company Lucamax Pictures is currently developing several long and short form entertainment projects.

Branit created World Builder, an emotional short film demonstrating futuristic computer interfaces used to create a holographic world for a woman apparently in a medical coma. The movie won several short film awards such as the KC Filmmakers Jubilee, the Indianapolis International Film Festival and the Indy Shorts Fest. Branit is also known for his work on the short film "405". This 3-minute film, co-produced by Jeremy Hunt, shows a DC-10 airliner make a suspenseful emergency landing on a Los Angeles freeway.

== Early life and education ==
Branit studied industrial design at the University of Kansas.

== Filmography ==
- 2000 – 405
- 2007 – World Builder
- 2013 – State of the Union
- 2014 – Gotcher
- 2015 – Big Red Bow, Star Wars Spec Spot
- 2017 – The Lucid Engine
- 2019 – The Overlay (In production)
- 2020 – The Branch Manager (In development)

== Awards ==
2018 Shore Scripts - Feature Winner - Loop Thief (aka The Branch Manager)
2018 Visual Effects Society (VES) Nomination for Best Supporting VFX in a TV Series - Westworld
2018 Emmy Award Nomination for VFX in a TV Series - Westworld
2016 Emmy Award Nomination for VFX in a TV Series - 11–22–63
2014 Visual Effects Society (VES) Nomination for Best Supporting VFX in a TV Series- Breaking Bad
2014 Page Screenplay Quarterfinalist “Occupy Dawn (aka State of the Union)”
2013 Emmy Award Nomination for VFX in a TV Series - Breaking Bad
2009 WINNER Cineglobe (CERN) Film Festival - “World Builder” Short Film
2008 Seattle International Film Festival Finalist - “World Builder” Short Film
2001 Emmy Award Nomination for VFX in a TV Series - Enterprise
1999 Emmy Award Nomination for VFX in a TV Series - Star Trek: Deep Space Nine
1999 Emmy Award Nomination for VFX in a TV Series - Star Trek: Voyager
1998 Emmy Award Nomination for VFX in a TV Series - Star Trek: Voyager
