= Ronald B. Moore =

American visual effects producer

- Education: Brooks Institute of Photography
- Occupation: Special effects supervisor
- Years active: 1978–present
- Known for: Star Trek: The Next Generation, Voyager and Enterprise
- Awards: 5 Emmy Awards

Ronald B. Moore is an American visual effects producer and five-time Emmy award winner. Moore was the visual effects supervisor on Star Trek spin-off series Star Trek: The Next Generation, Star Trek: Voyager and Star Trek: Enterprise. He was involved with such films as Ghostbusters and Birdman.

He is not to be confused with Ronald D. Moore, one of his co-workers who served as a scriptwriter on Star Trek: The Next Generation.

== Early life and military career ==
While he attended junior and high school, Moore acted as the school's photographer. After school, he joined the United States Navy as a photographer. When he left the service, he attended the Brooks Institute of Photography and earned a Bachelor's degree in photographic arts with a major in motion picture production.

== Special effects career ==
Moore began working in the film industry in 1978, and for a period worked at Boss Film Studios under Richard Edlund. While there, he worked on films such as Ghostbusters and 2010 as well as a variety of television series. He joined the team on Star Trek: The Next Generation working on the pilot episode, "Encounter at Farpoint". Industrial Light & Magic had produced a series of shots of the new Enterprise, with the intention that these would be used throughout the series. Moore was familiar with ILM's techniques and when he interviewed for the position he was shown the raw non-composited footage. He later said because he understood the "mess", he was hired to fix it and this resulted in 18 years of continuous employment on the franchise.

His initial role was to organise the main titles, and then afterwards he became the visual effects coordinator. He was then promoted to visual effects supervisor, and to complete the work he split the special effects section into two teams who would work on alternating episodes. Moore also worked on two video games in the franchise, Star Trek: Klingon and Star Trek: Borg. Moore adopted the use of his middle initial to differentiate himself from writer Ronald D. Moore, who also worked on the series. However, he is still sometimes confused by fans with the other Moore and on occasion signs as him rather than point out the mistake.

He continued to work on the series through the seven seasons, and on the first feature film, Star Trek Generations as supervisor of visual effects. He then joined the team on Star Trek: Voyager, and when that series finished, switched to Star Trek: Enterprise. He appeared on screen as Commander Ronald Moore of the USS Pegasus in the finale of Enterprise, "These Are the Voyages...". Outside of Star Trek, he has worked on a variety of other projects including the visual effects on the music video for the Michael Jackson single Black or White, and the Alejandro González Iñárritu film Birdman. Moore also formed OMR Productions, alongside Dan Curry, a special effects colleague from his time on the Star Trek series.

=== Awards and nominations ===
Moore won five Emmy Awards for his work on Star Trek, as well as 11 nominations.
