= Danny Gordon Taylor =

- Born: May 21, 1950; North Tonawanda, New York, U.S.
- Died: July 10, 2019 (aged 69); Lapeer, Michigan, U.S.
- Occupation: Visual effects artist
- Years active: 1994–2019

Danny Gordon Taylor (May 21, 1950 – July 10, 2019) was an Animation Supervisor in the Visual Effects industry. He started his career at Industrial Light and Magic in 1994 working on "The Mask" and animated or supervised on several ground breaking visual effects movies through to "Alita: Battle Angel" in 2019. He worked at several of the leading visual effects houses including ILM, Digital Domain and Weta Digital.

On January 24, 2012, he was nominated for an Oscar for the film Real Steel. He died in 2019, aged 69.
