= Norway Corporation =

Media production company

Norway Corporation also called Norway Productions, Inc., is a motion picture and television production company established by Gene Roddenberry in 1959. Norway Corporation is best known for having been the production company that brought Star Trek to television on the NBC network in association with Desilu Studios, which later became part of Paramount Television.

== History ==
Gene Roddenberry decided to become a producer as a direct result of his frustrations with his work as a television writer and the difficulty he faced in adding anything substantial to his stories. On February 13, 1959, he incorporated the company in California. According to the entry for Norway Corporation on the Audiovisual Identity Database (AVID), Norway was the name of the street Roddenberry lived on when he was growing up. The Lieutenant, a 1963-1964 NBC and MGM Television series about the United States Marine Corps that starred Gary Lockwood as Lieutenant William Rice, was the first series he created and produced. Several future cast members of Star Trek first worked with Roddenberry as regular or guest cast members of The Lieutenant. As of August 1993 the president and secretary of the company was Lewi M. Overton, Jr., but by April 12, 1994, the company restated its articles of incorporation and listed Majel Roddenberry (Gene's widow) as those same officers. As of 2023, the chief executive officer of Norway was Eugene Roddenberry, Jr., Gene's son.

== Star Trek ==
Roddenberry developed his idea for Star Trek while working on The Lieutenant. Desilu's vice president of production, Herbert F. Solow, purchased the series concept and made a production deal with Roddenberry in April 1964. Roddenberry pitched the show as "Wagon Train to the Stars" even though it owed more to C. S. Forrester's writings about Horatio Hornblower than to any western.

Having lost money on a series of failed pilots over the course of the early 1960s, Desilu had become severely cash-poor and was desperate to regain its past success. Although NBC rejected the first pilot, its executives were impressed favorably enough to commission an unprecedented second pilot, which the network picked up for the 1966–67 season. Star Trek premiered on September 8, 1966. Star Trek's end credits listed the show as "A Desilu Production in association with Norway Corporation" for the entire first season, followed by the credit "Executive in charge of production, Herbert F. Solow." But when Desilu and Paramount merged midway through the second season, this became "A Paramount Production in association with Norway Corporation," which was how it stayed for the remainder of the program's run. In the third season, the end credit "Douglas S. Cramer, Executive Vice President in charge of production" followed this listing.

Star Trek suffered from declining ratings throughout its three-year run; from the premiere to the final episode, Star Trek's ratings had dropped more than fifty percent. Before production began on the third season of Star Trek, Roddenberry had offered to demote himself to the position of line producer and personally supervise production of the show. In return, he wanted NBC to move the series to Monday nights at 7:30 PM. But at the last minute, mainly because George Schlatter would not allow Rowan & Martin's "Laugh-In" to be rescheduled from its then-current 8:00 PM time slot to 8:30 PM, NBC decided to move the show back to Friday nights at 10:00 PM, then considered a "suicide slot" for television programming, and Roddenberry, almost completely burned out from his struggles with both the network and the studio, effectively completely resigned from the series.

== Star Trek: The Animated Series ==
In 1972, Roddenberry was approached by Filmation Studios about the possibility of an animated version of Star Trek for Saturday mornings. Premiering on NBC in 1973, Star Trek: The Animated Series was a joint production of Norway Corporation, Filmation Associates, and Paramount Television. Roddenberry delegated most production chores to D.C. Fontana, who was credited as associate producer-story editor. The overall approach to the Animated Series proceeded with storytelling in the same style that Norway Corporation had with the original live-action production. Roddenberry, however, later stated that little of the Animated Series actually counted towards canon for Star Trek, a statement some fans have disputed.

== After Star Trek ==
Roddenberry created several other science-fiction television series concepts, often produced through Norway Corporation. Five of these concepts had pilot films produced; none, however, were picked up for series production. These pilots were:

- The Questor Tapes, which starred Robert Foxworth alongside Mike Farrell,
- Genesis II, which starred Alex Cord and Mariette Hartley,
- Planet Earth, which starred John Saxon alongside Janet Margolin with Ted Cassidy, and Diana Muldaur,
- Strange New World, and
- The made-for-television film Spectre, which was to be a backdoor pilot.

Of the five, Genesis II, Planet Earth, and Spectre were credited as being produced by Norway Corporation.

Some sources have credited Norway Corporation as having produced Star Trek: The Motion Picture and Star Trek: The Next Generation. Although Roddenberry served as Executive Producer on both the film and series, there is no evidence that he did so using Norway Corporation as his production company.
