= U.S. television science fiction =

U.S. television science fiction is a popular genre of television in the United States that has produced many of the best-known and most popular science fiction shows in the world. Most famous of all, and one of the most influential science-fiction series in history, is the iconic Star Trek and its various spin-off shows, which comprise the Star Trek franchise. Other hugely influential programs have included the 1960s anthology series The Twilight Zone, the internationally successful The X-Files, and a wide variety of television movies and continuing series for more than half a century.

== History ==
=== 20th century ===
==== 1940s through the mid-1960s ====
===== The adventure serials =====
The first popular science-fiction program on American television was the DuMont Television Network children's adventure serial Captain Video and His Video Rangers, which ran from June 1949 to April 1955. Within eight months of Captain Video's debut, two other landmark series were launched - Tom Corbett, Space Cadet (August 1950 - June 1955) and Space Patrol (March 1950 - February 1955). ABC attempted to cash in on the burgeoning television science fiction market with a small screen version of Buck Rogers in 1950, but failed within months. Another series of the 1950s, Rod Brown of the Rocket Rangers broadcast live Saturdays from April 18, 1953, to May 29, 1954. The show was eventually cancelled due to a copyright infringement lawsuit based on the show's conceptual similarity to Tom Corbett, Space Cadet.

Although Captain Video was not a very sophisticated program by later standards, this series took advantage of many newly developed technologies, such as luminance key effects to create superimposition, although it also fell back on such older techniques as using stock footage from film libraries to cover scene breaks. Its reported budget for new props was just $25 per episode.

Nevertheless, Captain Video proved to be very popular, drawing audiences of 3.5 million at its peak, a more than respectable number for television at that time. It fired the imaginations of many of its young viewers, who had never before seen science fiction outside of cinemas, and had never been able to follow the same characters in a science-fiction setting over a prolonged period of time. The financial crisis of the DuMont Network eventually led to the cancellation of Captain Video, and soon the collapse of the entire network itself. However, the program had made its mark, and other science-fiction shows followed during the 1950s.

Within eight months of the debut of Captain Video, two other series would come to eclipse the program in popular memory. Tom Corbett, Space Cadet (1950–55) and Space Patrol (1950–55) were a fast-turnaround second generation of TV sci-fi, telling more compelling stories on larger budgets. Thanks to a stronger connection to their sponsors, both shows offered a shower of mail-in premiums that solidified their brand names, leading to the first TV tie-in toys on store shelves. Both offered daily radio programs featuring the television casts to augment their television adventures, and the actors were pressed into service for public appearances on a weekly basis. The schedule was grueling, but the resulting media blitz resulted in a large and loyal fan base for both programs. Both of these shows offered something Captain Video could not - due to the poor budget of the series, Captain Video was earthbound. The space adventures of Tom Corbett and Space Patrol forced Captain Video to eventually take to the stars to compete.

(A sidenote: most modern television viewers are aware of Captain Video only by his mention by Art Carney on The Honeymooners; by the time the episode was aired, the show had already been cancelled, and the space helmet Carney wore was a commercially available toy marketed from Space Patrol.)

ABC’s attempt to cash in on the success of this genre was a small screen version of Buck Rogers, which had already proved to be a huge success as a film serial in the 1930s. Running for a single season, 1950–1951, ABC's Buck Rogers starred Kem Dibbs and later Robert Pastene in the lead role. Like Captain Video, it was the victim of a very small budget, which restricted most of its action to a single laboratory set, hardly the most thrilling of situations for its young target audience.

Another 1930s serial was also resurrected for the small screen: Flash Gordon, starring Steve Holland in the title role. Episode credits indicate that it was filmed in Germany and France and syndicated in the U.S. It ran for a single season of 39 episodes, from 1953 to 1954. Another film hero, an alien living on Earth, transitioned to television in the Adventures of Superman which ran from 1952 to 1958.

Other series existed, but mostly in independent syndication. Captain Z-Ro was initially broadcast locally in San Francisco beginning in 1951, but moved to national syndication during its final two years of production beginning in 1954. Rocky Jones, Space Ranger was syndicated nationally for its two-year run from 1954 to 1955. Generally a superior program to most of the sci-fi series of the time, Rocky Jones was a victim of timing; by 1954, public interest was returning to the western genre. By the end of 1955, all of the episodic science fiction adventure series were gone from the airwaves.

===== The anthology series =====
Gradually, television producers realized that there was an adult audience as well as a young audience for science fiction. Television began to cater to a more cerebral brand of science fiction viewer, possibly inspired by the contemporary boom in literary science fiction by the likes of Isaac Asimov, or by the popularity of the allegorical science-fiction movies that were produced during the decade, such as The Day the Earth Stood Still.

One of the stalwarts of science fiction television programming in its early decades was the anthology series, in which a completely new story would be presented in each episode, with new actors, settings, and situations. The only continuing link was the producers, the genre, and the series title. The first series of this kind was Tales of Tomorrow running for 85 episodes, between 1951 and 1953, it was meant to be the first science fiction show for adults. The next popular series was Science Fiction Theatre, a syndicated series that ran for 78 episodes between 1955 and 1957.

Two years after its run finished, a much more popular and influential program in the same vein debuted on the CBS Network: The Twilight Zone, hosted by Rod Serling. The Twilight Zone began life as a one-off pilot, commissioned after the success of a science-fiction episode of the general drama anthology series Westinghouse-Desilu Playhouse. In its original form, the series ran for five years, from September 1959 until September 1964, with 156 episodes aired during that time. Presenting a vast array of science-fiction and horror concepts, its run included many memorable episodes whose imagery still lingers in American popular consciousness. One of its most enduring motifs has been its theme music, which is now recognized internationally.

The Twilight Zone was the bedrock of the more grown-up science fiction that would be produced during the 1960s. It was shot on film (as was now standard for much American non-live television programs), well-produced, and featured imaginative writing. One of the best-known episodes was the 1963 installment "Nightmare at 20,000 Feet," which starred a young William Shatner (later cast as Star Trek's Captain Kirk) as a man convinced that a hideous monster is lurking on the wing of the airplane in which he is traveling, even though nobody else can see it. That episode helped launch the career of Shatner, as well as a film version and a revival series during the 1980s.

ABC twice attempted their own science fiction anthologies, first with 1959's One Step Beyond, then with 1963's The Outer Limits. (ABC briefly tried to hire Serling after The Twilight Zone ended, but Serling noted that ABC's proposal was more horror-oriented in that it "booked (him) into a graveyard every week" and turned the network down.) Although The Outer Limits had a much shorter run, finishing in 1965, it proved to be famous and influential as well. Like its CBS contemporary, it spawned an only moderately successful revival decades later. One Step Beyond survived in frequent reruns because its owner, Alcoa, abandoned the copyright.

===== Return of the adventure series =====
Irwin Allen, who later went on to produce famous 1970s disaster movies like The Poseidon Adventure and The Towering Inferno, produced a whole range of popular science fiction series shows on American television during the 1960s. These included Voyage to the Bottom of the Sea (1964–1968), The Time Tunnel (1966–1967), and Land of the Giants (1968–1970). All involved futuristic, scientific concepts played out as the background to glossily produced action/adventure shows. Critics of Allen’s output often argue that it is all rather soulless and shallow, but as mass-produced entertainment it proved popular with American and international audiences. A popular non-Allen production was The Wild Wild West (1965 to 1969) which incorporated classic Western elements, espionage thriller and science fiction/alternate history concepts (in a similar vein to what would later be called steampunk).

The mid 1960s would prove to be an important period in the history of US television science fiction. It saw the creation of two brand new "space opera"-based science fiction shows, both featuring broad galactic exploration themes, with each show dealing with them in very different manners. The first of these was Irwin Allen's CBS show Lost in Space, which ran for three seasons from 1965 to 1968, and the other series, which premiered on NBC in 1966, was Star Trek.

==== Star Trek and its influence ====
===== The series =====
Star Trek (later retronymically known as Star Trek: The Original Series) began as an unscreened pilot made in 1964 before the series began in 1966. The show was conceived by screenwriter and producer Gene Roddenberry, depicting a future of galactic exploration and struggle, with all creeds and colors of humanity working together to explore the stars in a similar manner to the pioneers of the old West in America. Produced by Paramount for the NBC Network, Roddenberry’s original 1964 pilot for Star Trek, called "The Cage" and starring Jeffrey Hunter as Captain Christopher Pike, was regarded as being too intellectual and slow-moving by the network: however, they had sufficient faith in the ideas behind the program to commission a second pilot, which replaced the character of Pike and all but one of the rest (Spock, played by Leonard Nimoy, was the only character carried over from the original 1964 pilot) with a new crew commanded by Captain James T. Kirk, played by William Shatner. The show used a few established science fiction authors. Harlan Ellison wrote “The City on the Edge of Forever”, Richard Matheson wrote "The Enemy Within," and Theodore Sturgeon wrote “Shore Leave” and “Amok Time”.

===== Star Trek and social commentary =====
Star Trek was also known for its social commentary. The background for this commentary was a set of alien cultures that roughly paralleled the Earth of today. The United Federation of Planets was analogous to America, Starfleet to NATO, the Klingons to the Soviet Union, and the Romulans to China.

When that background seemed restrictive, Star Trek would create new cultures and new situations. When an episode was written about racial prejudice (“Let That Be Your Last Battlefield”), half-black and half-white aliens were created. Frank Gorshin, playing Commissioner Bele, was black on the right side of his body, and white on the left. He was trying to arrest Lokai, played by Lou Antonio, who was black on the left, and white on the right. When Bele brought Lokai back to their home planet, no one was left alive. A racial war had killed everybody. In spite of Kirk saying “Give up your hate”, Bele and Lokai fled the Enterprise and continued their fight on the planet's surface. The focus of this episode was not technology, but feelings and philosophy. The prejudice, and the pursuit of Lokai by Bele could have been a story without the presence of a star ship, and a pursuit across the galaxy. Therefore, it would be an example of soft science fiction.

Star Trek could also be technical. In the episode "The Changeling," Nomad is an Earth space probe that becomes damaged, and then somehow merges with the alien probe Tan-Ru. Its programming somehow changes, and it now seeks out and destroys imperfect life-forms. Nomad destroys the Malurian System's four billion inhabitants, and then encounters the Enterprise. Kirk and his crew discover Nomad's past and its new programming, and have to stop it before it destroys any more races. This, of course, they do. This is a classic case of out-of-control technology. Without Nomad, the technological artifact, there could have been no story. Science is used to analyze Nomad, and to determine how to defeat it. Therefore, this episode is an example of hard science fiction.

In this new form, Star Trek ran for three years until 1969, although it was never a huge ratings hit and stopped two years short of its planned five-year run. Only a fan campaign had prevented it from being canceled after the second season, but despite this apparent unpopularity, the show had a special quality to it that attracted a loyal fan base, and during syndication of the program in the early 1970s it proved to have an enduring popularity that would not go away. An animated series was commissioned, and eventually in the late 1970s a sequel series, Star Trek: Phase II was planned and work begun. However, after the success of Star Wars in the cinema, Paramount scrapped the idea of a new series and decided instead upon launching Star Trek as a film franchise. Star Trek would return to the small screen in a new form in due course, but not until 1987, some eighteen years after its original cancellation.

Star Trek's propensity for social commentary, in an era when American viewers were more receptive of it, was a factor in the rise in popularity of science fiction in American culture in the late 1960s. Much of this rise came at the expense of the more traditionally positioned TV western, which collapsed in popularity at the same time.

==== 1970s ====
Apart from repeats of Star Trek gathering popularity in syndication, the early 1970s proved to be at something of a low ebb for television science fiction in the US. Very few series of any great note or popularity were produced, and few if any from this period are remembered today. The success in syndication of the original Star Trek series, and fan pressure for a Star Trek revival, led to The Animated Series (1973–1974). The Animated Series continued the adventures of the Enterprise and its crew, and is considered canonical. After several false starts, a second live-action Star Trek series began development in 1977, prospectively titled Star Trek: Phase II. However, the show was abruptly cancelled just weeks away from commencing production and Paramount decided to make a feature film instead, which was eventually released in 1979.

After the end of the original Star Trek series, and before the first Star Trek movie, producer Gene Roddenberry tried unsuccessfully to pitch new science fiction shows; while most never got off the ground, some made it to the pilot stage and aired as TV movies, though none became fully-fledged series. Genesis II (1973) starred Alex Cord as a scientist who finds himself involved in a post-apocalyptic war after centuries spent in suspended animation. The story was recycled and retooled over two further pilot films, Planet Earth (1974) and Strange New World (1975), neither of which were successful. Roddenberry's later The Questor Tapes (1974) involves an android that disappears to seek his creator.

It was not until later in the decade, again inspired by the post-Star Wars boom of 1977 and beyond, that science fiction series began to return to prominence. One of those particularly keen on exploiting the networks’ new interest in the genre was producer Glen A. Larson, who created two new science fiction series in quick succession: his own original creation Battlestar Galactica/Galactica 1980 (1978–80) and another television version of Buck Rogers, this time entitled Buck Rogers in the 25th Century (1979–81). Both of these series had much in common. They were glossily produced on high budgets, with pilot episodes that were released theatrically into cinemas in some territories. However, both series seemed to place an emphasis on style over content, with the scripts generally being run of-the-mill action/adventure affairs with few of the more challenging concepts of science fiction of their predecessors. It is perhaps for this reason that both programs were so short lived, although they did attract highly dedicated and vociferous fan bases and do still linger to a certain extent in the popular consciousness.

A successful British science fiction series Doctor Who was syndicated in the US starting in 1972, with selected episodes of Jon Pertwee's time as the Doctor. In 1978, Tom Baker's first four seasons as the Doctor were sold to PBS stations across the United States.

==== 1980s ====
Science fiction print authors didn't usually make it onto TV. Most TV scripts were created originally for TV. One of the few famous print authors to make it to the small screen was Ray Bradbury. His collection of linked stories The Martian Chronicles, was produced as a mini-series that first aired in 1980. Labeled as “faithful” but “bland” it included such stars as Rock Hudson, Darren McGavin, Roddy McDowall and Bernadette Peters.

The most significant US science fiction television series of the early 1980s was the 1983 miniseries V, which aired on NBC. An allegorical tale paralleling the rise of Nazism in Germany of the 1930s with the arrival on Earth of an apparently friendly alien race with hidden motives, the miniseries proved to be highly popular and iconic, spawning both a sequel V: The Final Battle the following year, and then a full-blown television series for the 1984–1985 season, although neither of these were as successful as the original, being more action-oriented and somewhat less cerebral.

1987 saw the arrival of what is perhaps the most successful, in terms of sales and worldwide viewing figures, science fiction series of all time, Gene Roddenberry’s re-launching of his Star Trek franchise, Star Trek: The Next Generation. Taking place on a new starship Enterprise some seventy years after the events of the original series, unlike its predecessor it was not supported by a network, but instead sold directly into syndication. The program was a huge success, running for seven seasons and like the original series spawning several feature film spin-offs.

Another 1987 series was the oddball Max Headroom. Originally a British pilot film, it was picked up and re-made in America as a darkly comical drama series which followed an investigative video news journalist, Edison Carter (played by Matt Frewer) as he pursued stories and exposed scandals in a dystopian, TV-obsessed future. Edison was aided and abetted by a group of friends and colleagues, and by his electronic alter-ego, the stuttering, sarcastic iconoclast, Max Headroom. Although Max himself became something of a pop-culture phenomenon of the 1980s, the series itself was not a great success—despite being lauded for its portrayal of a world "20 minutes into the future", a Blade Runner-like cyberpunk world, where TV channels and ratings wars were everything, and people (particularly those at the margins of society known as "blanks", who had no record in the worldwide computer database and hence did not officially exist) were nothing.

A 1988 television series was the immensely successful British science fiction sitcom Red Dwarf. It originated from a 1980s' recurring radio sketch: Dave Hollins: Space Cadet and ran for 10 series over three time periods - Series 1-6 between 1988 and 1993, Series 7 & 8 between 1997 and 1999, plus a 3-parter (Series 9) in 2008 and Series 10 in 2012. In addition to the television series, there are four bestselling novels, two pilot episodes for an American version of the show, a radio version produced for BBC Radio 7,[2] tie-in books, magazines and other merchandise. Red Dwarf was a mining ship running between Earth and Jupiter which experienced a radiation leak that kills almost all the crew. The series is based on the "odd couple" survivors.

In the fall of 1989, the Alien Nation television series premiered. The drama was based on the 1988 film which was written by Rockne S. O'Bannon (who would become a television showrunner in his own right and would create several other science fiction television shows) and starred actor James Caan. The original film was a buddy cop action picture with a plot involving extraterrestrials who land on earth and attempt to assimilate into human society. The television series continued the storyline, but among the theme of science fiction, the writers injected other elements such as discrimination and racism into the episodes. The series lasted only one season, but it did spawn five television films, a comics series, and a number of novels.

Until the successful debut of the 2019 Disney+ show The Mandalorian that would result in the expansion of the live-action television side for the franchise, Star Wars was less known for its television products aside from animated shows. The mega-franchises' only live-action television productions during the Eighties were the spin-off movies Ewoks: Caravan of Courage and Ewoks: Battle for Endor. (Note: Both of these films are considered canon within the Star Wars expanded universe, but neither was carried over to Disney's Star Wars canon. The Mandalorian, The Book of Boba Fett, Obi-Wan Kenobi, Andor, Ahsoka, The Acolyte and Skeleton Crew serve as the canonical live-action television productions.)

==== 1990s ====
The success of Star Trek: The Next Generation led to further Star Trek series which took place within the same time frame: firstly Star Trek: Deep Space Nine (1993–99) and later UPN’s Star Trek: Voyager (1994–2001) and Star Trek: Enterprise (2001–05). All of these series have helped affirm the iconic status of the Star Trek franchise, but as well as this they helped lead to a science fiction boom of the 1990s, as many networks and production companies sought to make their own shows in a genre which had shown itself to be incredibly popular and profitable again.

Although there were many run-of-the-mill series that did not get past a single season, this boom decade for science-fiction produced many intelligently written, creative, imaginative shows that have in a very short period of time been able to establish themselves in the popular consciousness of television viewers not just in the US, but worldwide as well.

Earth 2, story, with female lead, about castaways/colonists on extrasolar planet was cancelled after first season (1994-95). Space: Above and Beyond also lasted just one season – 1995–96. The basic premise was space Marines defending Earth against hostile aliens. seaQuest DSV, on the other hand, had a star in Roy Scheider. He played Captain Nathan Bridger from 1993 to 1995. He was replaced for the 1995–96 season by Michael Ironside, who played Captain Oliver Hudson. The show was cancelled after that season.

However, one of the more successful and most artistically ambitious series of this period was Babylon 5. Produced and largely written by J. Michael Straczynski with creative input by Harlan Ellison, this show attempted to create a series-long epic tale that avoided many of the clichés of the television genre. The series was highly acclaimed for its writing and its innovative visuals as the first television series to extensively use computer-generated imagery to create spectacular visual effects for an economical price. In addition, its five-season run (1993–98), the intended length of the series, was longer than any American non Star Trek space series up to that time.

===== 1990s Earth-bound series =====
There were time-travel and dimension-hopping series in the vein of Quantum Leap (1989–93) and Sliders (1995–2000), and mysterious conspiracy thrillers such as The X-Files (1993–2002). The latter series in particular enshrined itself within the pop culture of a generation in a manner in which few television series are able, and the entire decade produced a rich vein of highly successful science fiction shows.

=== 21st century ===
==== 2000s ====
===== Declining interest =====
At the turn of the century, however, a change began in the type of telefantasy program that was popular with the viewing masses. Most of the genre programming to be found on the networks was horror or fantasy based rather than science-fiction as such: there was perhaps a sense that audiences were tired of science-fiction, and sought other types of programs. Others would say there was a TV exec backlash against the Genre, others would claim a media conglomerate displeasure with the costs associated with high production values needed by a good quality science fiction show. Thus the rise to production of such shows as Buffy the Vampire Slayer, its spin-off Angel and the stylistically similar Charmed. All of these were set in the real world of the present day, but involved fantastical and horrific threats to the central characters, and possessed a wit and self-awareness that had perhaps been lacking in some of their more po-faced science-fiction predecessors, not to mention much lower costs to produce.

===== Other shows =====
Nonetheless, the popularity of science fiction as a genre means that several notable programs enjoyed significant longevity. Stargate SG-1 began in 1997 and aired 10 seasons, and is somewhat unusual in being a successful spin-off series from the 1994 movie. The series became the longest-running North American science fiction television series, which warranted two spin-offs: Stargate Atlantis, which ran for five seasons; and Stargate Universe, which ran for only two seasons instead of the originally planned five. Stargate SG-1 retained its record until Smallville completed its run with 218 episodes in 2011 and broke its record. The Sci-Fi Channel "original series" Farscape (which is in fact not American, but actually Australian, and premiered on the Nine Network, although the series was conceived by an American (the aforementioned Rockne S. O'Bannon)), while never garnering a widespread audience, was heralded by critics and gained a dedicated fanbase, which helped the creators wrap up several story lines in the miniseries event Farscape: The Peacekeeper Wars after the show's cancellation. The aforementioned Star Trek: Enterprise ran for four seasons, and the Sci Fi Channel aired a mini-series based on the original Battlestar Galactica, whose success paved the way for the acclaimed Battlestar Galactica, which lasted for four seasons and two movies, Battlestar Galactica: Razor and Battlestar Galactica: The Plan. Fringe, which featured a mad scientist character and explored alternate universes, aired for 100 episodes (2008-2013) on Fox.

The nature of science fiction as a genre and the trends of American culture allows is to explore the whole range of all types of science fiction from comedy to drama, just entertainment to socially relevant, youth to adult, soft to hard, gross to tasteful, cheap to expensive productions, and lame to thoughtful.

Despite trends in television, science fiction as a genre has firmly established its place in the make-up of American programming. The future of science fiction could be significantly helped by the advances in digital imagery, which allows for spectacular visual effects for a relatively economical price.

== Other science fiction television genres ==
Two other subgenres were comic science fiction, and youth science fiction (children and teenagers). Examples of the former are My Favorite Martian, CBS, 1963–66; Mork & Mindy, ABC 1978–1982; ALF, NBC, 1986–90; and 3rd Rock from the Sun, NBC, 1996–2001.

There are many examples of youth science fiction. They are characterized by relatively simple plots, and characters despite lacking production value. The animated Colonel Bleep launched in 1957 and went on to a long run in first-run syndication. A British import using marionettes was Fireball XL5, initially released in 1962. Fireball XL5 was a rocket ship protecting Sector 25 of the Solar System. Also first released in 1962 was Space Angel, a cartoon. “Space Angel” was the code name for Scott McCloud, captain of a space ship.

The Jetsons, an animated domestic sitcom that debuted in 1962, was noted for its unusually accurate portrayal of future society. Jeffrey A. Tucker wrote in 2011 that The Jetsons is "distinguished in science-fiction lore by the fact that it is a rare attempt in this genre that actually succeeds in predicting the future." Usually, Jonny Quest, (1964–65), was a cartoon adventure, but with science fiction technology, e.g. a rocket ship and a hovercraft. Higher production values were quite evident in the Zenon trilogy released by the Disney Channel. Zenon: Girl of the 21st Century was released in 1999, Zenon: The Zequel was released in 2001, and Zenon: Z3 was released in 2004.

== Bibliography ==
- Asherman, Allan (1986). The Star Trek Compendium. Pocket Books. ISBN 0-671-62726-0.
- Malcom, Nollinger, Rudolph, Tomashoff, Weeks, & Williams (August 1, 2004). 25 Greatest Sci-Fi Legends. TV Guide, pp. 31–39.
- gateworld.com/Smallville bows with Stargates world record May 6, 2011
