= List of awards and nominations received by Gene Roddenberry =

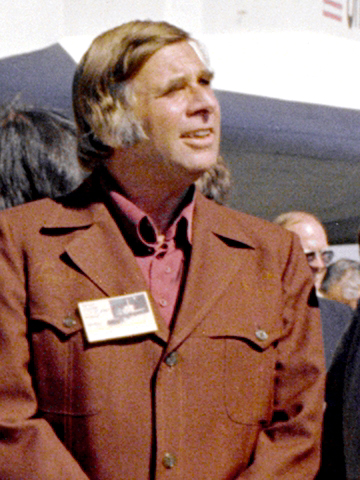
Gene Roddenberry in 1976

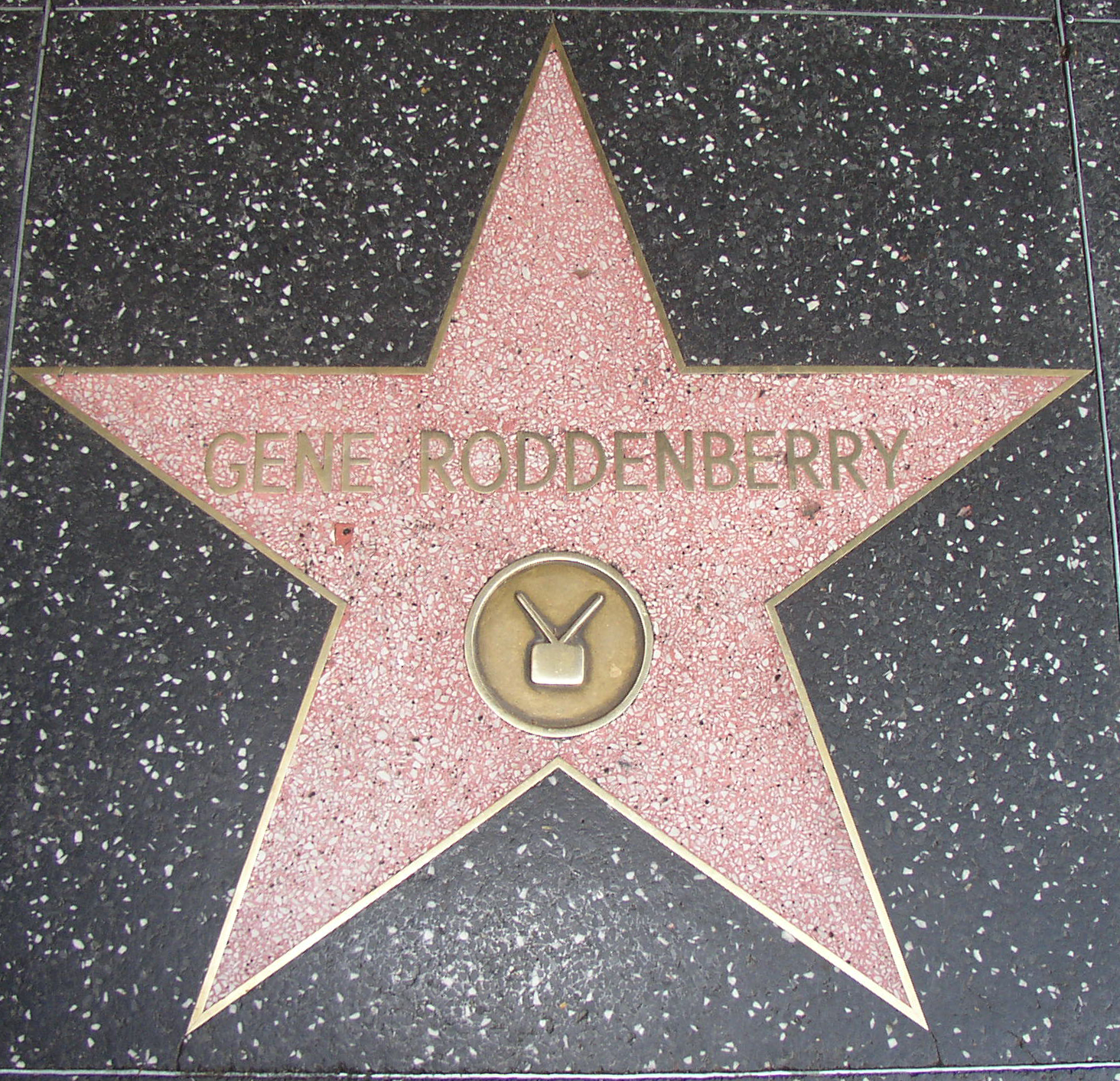
Gene Roddenberry's star on the Hollywood Walk of Fame

Gene Roddenberry (August 19, 1921 – October 24, 1991) was an American screenwriter and producer of several television series, best known for his work in creating the Star Trek franchise. Before his television writing career, he was a pilot in the 394th Bomb Squadron, 5th Bombardment Group of the Thirteenth Air Force during World War II. During his time in the military, he flew the Boeing B-17 Flying Fortress, and was awarded both the Air Medal and the Distinguished Flying Cross. While working in the Los Angeles Police Department after the war, he began his television writing career, but resigned to concentrate on screenwriting. His first writing award was for an episode of Have Gun – Will Travel entitled "Helen of Abajinan" which won the Writers Guild of America award for Best Teleplay in 1958. In 1964, he registered the idea with the Writers Guild which would define the rest of his career—Star Trek.

The majority of the awards and nominations received by Roddenberry throughout his career were related to Star Trek. He was credited for Star Trek: The Original Series (known at the time simply as Star Trek) during the nominations for two Emmy Awards, and won two Hugo Awards. One Hugo was a special award for the series, while another was for "The Menagerie", the episode which used footage from the original unaired pilot for Star Trek, "The Cage". In addition, he was awarded the Brotherhood Award by the National Association for the Advancement of Colored People for his work in the advancement of African American characters on television.

At the 1967 Writers Guild of America Awards, a private feud between Roddenberry and writer Harlan Ellison entered the public eye, as Ellison had produced the original script for the episode "The City on the Edge of Forever". He was told to re-write it due to financial constraints, but could not bring it within budget. Instead, Roddenberry re-wrote the script for the episode, but Ellison retained the credit and subsequently submitted the original script for consideration by the Writers Guild. This was an unusual step as normally the filmed version of the script is the one that was submitted. Both "The City on the Edge of Forever" and "The Return of the Archons" were nominated for the Best Episodic Drama Award, with the latter written and credited to Roddenberry. Ellison won the award for his script. Roddenberry submitted the filmed version of "The City on the Edge of Forever" script for the Hugo Awards, winning in 1968, but the writing remained credited to Ellison. Roddenberry later claimed to have won a Nebula Award for the filmed version despite the Dramatic Presentation category not being created until 1974. (Note: Roddenberry and Gene Coon were recommended for the 1974 Nebula Awards for The Questor Tapes, but did not make the final ballot.)

Following the end of Star Trek, he was nominated for Hugo Awards for two television movies, Genesis II and The Questor Tapes. (Note: Both of these movies had originally been created as pilots for new series, but Genesis II was dropped by CBS in favor of a Planet of the Apes television series and Roddenberry backed out of The Questor Tapes following NBC's request for substantial changes.) In addition to awards, Roddenberry also received a star on the Hollywood Walk of Fame following a campaign by the fan clubs of Star Trek, which sought to have each fan donate a dollar towards the overall $3500 cost of upkeep. Following these donations, the Committee in charge of the Walk of Fame voted Roddenberry in. The star was unveiled on September 4, 1985, at the 6600 block, near to the corner of Hollywood Boulevard and Las Palmas. The induction ceremony was attended by all of the main cast of Star Trek, as well as Roger C. Carmel, who portrayed Harry Mudd in The Original Series. Following Roddenberry's death in 1991, he was posthumously awarded the Robert A. Heinlein Memorial Award by the National Space Society and The George Pal Memorial Award at the Saturn Awards. He was also awarded the Exceptional Public Service Medal by National Aeronautics and Space Administration (NASA).

== Military awards ==
List of military awards
Year	Service	Medal	Ribbon	Ref
1945	United States Army Air Forces	Air Medal	A blue ribbon with two yellow columns.	
1945	United States Army Air Forces	Distinguished Flying Cross	A blue ribbon with a while column at either end, and a red column in the middle bordered by white.	

== Civilian awards ==
Key

† Awarded posthumously

List of civilian awards and nominations
Year	Award	Category	Series/Film	Episode	Result	Ref
1958	Writers Guild of America Award	Best Original Screenplay	Have Gun - Will Travel	"Helen of Abajinan"	Won	
1967	Emmy Award	Outstanding Dramatic Series	Star Trek		Nominated	
1967	National Association for the Advancement of Colored People	Brotherhood Award			Awarded	
1967	Writers Guild of America Award	Best Episodic Drama	Star Trek	"The Return of the Archons"	Nominated	
1968	Emmy Award	Outstanding Dramatic Series	Star Trek		Nominated	
1968	Hugo Award	Best Dramatic Presentation	Star Trek	"The Menagerie"	Won	
1968	Hugo Award	Special Award	Star Trek		Won	
1974	Hugo Award	Best Dramatic Presentation	Genesis II		Nominated	
1975	Hugo Award	Best Dramatic Presentation	The Questor Tapes		Nominated	
1980	Hugo Award	Best Dramatic Presentation	Star Trek: The Motion Picture		Nominated	
1980	Saturn Award	The Life Career Award (Note: Jointly awarded alongside William Shatner.)			Awarded	
1988	Hugo Award	Best Dramatic Presentation	Star Trek: The Next Generation	"Encounter at Farpoint"	Nominated	
1990	March of Dimes	Jack Benny Memorial Lifetime Achievement Award			Awarded	
1991	American Humanist Association	Humanist Arts Award			Awarded	
1992	National Space Society	Robert A. Heinlein Memorial Award†			Awarded	
1992	Saturn Award	The George Pal Memorial Award†			Awarded	
1993	NASA	Exceptional Public Service Medal†			Awarded	
