= List of science fiction television programs, G =

This is an inclusive list of science fiction television programs whose names begin with the letter G.

== G ==
Live-action

- G vs E a.k.a. Good vs Evil (1999–2000)
- Gabby Duran & the Unsittables (2019-2021)
- Galidor: Defenders of the Outer Dimension (2002)
- Galloping Galaxies (1985)
- Gangster World (1998, film) a.k.a. The Outsider IMDb
- Garth Marenghi's Darkplace (2004, UK)
- Gemini Man (1976)
- Generation X (1996, film)
- Genesis II (franchise):
  - Genesis II (1973, film, pilot)
  - Planet Earth (1974, film, pilot)
  - Strange New World (1975, film, pilot)
- The Ghosts of Motley Hall (1976)
- Giant Robo (franchise):
  - Giant Robo (1967–1968, Japan) a.k.a. Johnny Sokko and his Flying Robot (US)
- Girl from Tomorrow, The (franchise):
  - Girl from Tomorrow, The (1992, Australia)
  - Girl from Tomorrow Part II: Tomorrow's End, The (1993, Australia)
- Girl, the Gold Watch & Everything, The (franchise):
  - Girl, the Gold Watch & Everything, The (1980, film) IMDb
  - Girl, The Gold Watch, and Dynamite, The (1981, film) IMDb
- Godzilla (franchise):
  - Zone Fighter a.k.a. Ryusei Ningen Zone (1973, Japan)
  - Godzilla Island (1997–1998, Japan)
- Goodnight Sweetheart (1993–1999, UK)
- Grand Star (2007–2008, Canada/France/Belgium) a.k.a. Compagnie des glaces, La (France/Belgium)
- Grande Ourse (2003, Canada) IMDb
- Great Space Coaster, The (1981–1986, puppetry)
- Greatest American Hero, The (1981–1983)
- Guinevere Jones (2002)
- Gulliver's Travels (franchise):
  - Gulliver in Lilliput (1982, UK, miniseries) IMDb
  - Gulliver's Travels (1996, miniseries)
- Gundam (franchise):
  - G-Saviour (2000, US/Japan, film)

Animation

- G.I. Joe (franchise):
  - G.I. Joe: A Real American Hero (1985–1987, animated)
  - G.I. Joe: A Real American Hero (1989–1991, animated)
  - G.I. Joe Extreme (1995–1997, animated)
  - G.I. Joe: Sigma 6 (2005–2007, animated)
  - G.I. Joe: Resolute (2009, animated)
  - G.I. Joe: Renegades (2010–2011, animated)
- Gaiking (franchise):
  - Gaiking (1976–1977, Japan, animated)
  - Gaiking: Legend of Daiku-Maryu (2005–2006, Japan, animated)
- Galactik Football (2006–2011, France, animated)
- Galaxy Angel (franchise):
  - Galaxy Angel (2001–2002, Japan, animated)
  - Galaxy Angel Z (2002, Japan, animated)
  - Galaxy Angel A (2002, Japan, animated)
  - Galaxy Angel AA (2003, Japan, animated)
  - Galaxy Angel S (2003, Japan, special, animated)
  - Galaxy Angel X (2004, Japan, animated)
  - Galaxy Angel Rune (2006, Japan, animated)
- Galaxy High (1986, animated)
- Galaxy Railways, The (franchise):
  - Galaxy Railways, The (2003–2004, Japan, animated)
  - Galaxy Railways: Crossroads to Eternity, The (2006–2007, Japan, animated)
- Gankutsuou: The Count of Monte Cristo (2004–2005, Japan, animated)
- Gantz (2004, Japan, animated)
- Gargantia on the Verdurous Planet a.k.a. Suisei no Gargantia (2013, Japan, animated)
- Gasaraki (1998–1999, Japan, animated)
- Gatchaman (franchise):
  - Science Ninja Team Gatchaman a.k.a. Gatchaman (1972–1974, Japan, animated)
  - Gatchaman II a.k.a. Science Ninja Team Gatchaman II (1978–1979, Japan, animated)
  - Battle of the Planets (1978–1985, Science Ninja Team Gatchaman adaptation, US/Japan, animated)
  - Gatchaman Fighter a.k.a. Science Ninja Team Gatchaman Fighter (1979–1980, Japan, animated)
  - G-Force: Guardians of Space (1986, Science Ninja Team Gatchaman adaptation, US/Japan, animated)
  - Eagle Riders (1996–1997, Gatchaman II and Gatchaman Fighter adaptation, US/Australia/Japan, animated)
  - Gatchaman Crowds (2013, Japan, animated)
- Gate Keepers (2000, Japan, animated)
- Generator Gawl (1998, Japan, animated)
- Generator Rex (2010–2013, animated)
- Genesis Climber MOSPEADA (1983–1984, Japan, animated)
- Genesis of Aquarion (2005, Japan, animated)
- Getter Robo (franchise):
  - Getter Robo (1974–1975, Japan, animated)
  - Getter Robo G (1975–1976, Japan, animated)
  - Getter Robo Go (1991–1992, Japan, animated)
- Ghost in the Shell: Stand Alone Complex (S.A.C.) (franchise):
  - Ghost in the Shell: Stand Alone Complex (S.A.C.) (2002–2003, Japan, animated)
  - Ghost in the Shell: S.A.C. 2nd GIG (2004–2005, Japan, animated)
  - Ghost in the Shell: Stand Alone Complex – Solid State Society (2006, Japan, film, animated)
- Ghostbusters (franchise):
  - Extreme Ghostbusters (1997, animated)
  - Real Ghostbusters, The (1986–1991, animated)
- Giant Gorg (1984, Japan, animated)
- Giant Robo (franchise):
  - GR: Giant Robo (2007, Japan, animated)
- Gilligan's Planet (1982–1983, animated)
- Ginga Hyōryū Vifam (franchise):
  - Ginga Hyōryū Vifam (1983–1984, Japan, animated)
  - Ginga Hyōryū Vifam 13 (1998, Japan, animated)
- Ginga Kikoutai Majestic Prince (2013, Japan, animated)
- Ginga Sengoku Gun'yūden Rai (1994–1995, Japan, animated)
- Gintama (franchise):
  - Gintama (2006–2010, Japan, animated)
  - Yorinuki Gintama-san (2010–2011, Japan, animated)
  - Gintama' (2011–2013, Japan, animated)
- Girl Who Leapt Through Space, The (2009, Japan, animated)
- Glass Fleet (2006, Japan, animated)
- GoBots (franchise):
  - GoBots (1984, miniseries, animated)
  - Challenge of the GoBots a.k.a. Mighty Machine Men (1985, animated)
- God, the Devil and Bob (2000)
- Godzilla (franchise):
  - Godzilla (1978–1981, Japan/US, animated)
  - Godzilla: The Series (1998–2000, US/Japan, animated)
- Golden Warrior Gold Lightan (1981–1982, Japan, animated)
- Goliath the Super Fighter (1976, Japan, animated)
- Gordian Warrior (1979–1981, Japan, animated)
- GoShogun (1981, Japan, animated)
- Green Lantern: The Animated Series (2011–2012, animated)
- Groizer X (1976–1977, Japan, animated)
- Guardians of the Galaxy (2015–2019, animated)
- Gulliver's Travels (franchise):
  - Adventures of Gulliver, The (1968–1970, animated)
  - Gulliver's Travels (1992, Canada/US, animated) IMDb
- Gun X Sword a.k.a. Gun vs. Sword (2005–2006, Japan, animated)
- Gundam (franchise):
  - Mobile Suit Gundam (1979–1980, Japan, animated)
  - Mobile Suit Zeta Gundam (1985–1986, Japan, animated)
  - Mobile Suit Gundam ZZ (1986–1987, Japan, animated)
  - Mobile Suit Victory Gundam (1993–1994, Japan, animated)
  - Mobile Fighter G Gundam (1994–1995, Japan, animated)
  - Mobile Suit Gundam Wing (1995–1996, Japan, animated)
  - After War Gundam X a.k.a. Mobile New Century Gundam X (1996, Japan, animated)
  - Turn A Gundam a.k.a. ∀ Gundam (1999, Japan, animated)
  - Mobile Suit Gundam SEED (2002–2003, Japan, animated)
  - Superior Defender Gundam Force (2004, Japan, animated)
  - Mobile Suit Gundam SEED Destiny (2004–2005, Japan, animated)
  - Mobile Suit Gundam 00 (2007–2009, Japan, animated)
  - SD Gundam Sangokuden Brave Battle Warriors (2010–2011, Japan, animated)
  - Mobile Suit Gundam AGE (2011–2012, Japan, animated)
  - Gundam Build Fighters (2013–2014, Japan, animated)
  - Gundam Reconguista in G (2014–2015, Japan, animated)
  - Gundam Build Fighters Try (2014–2015, Japan, animated)
  - Mobile Suit Gundam: Iron-Blooded Orphans (2015–2017, Japan, animated)
  - Gundam Build Divers (2018, Japan, animated)
- Gungrave (2003–2004, Japan, animated)
- Gurren Lagann a.k.a. Tengen Toppa Gurren Lagann (2007, Japan, animated)
- Guyver: The Bioboosted Armor (2005–2006, Japan, animated)
