= Gene L. Coon =

American screenwriter, TV producer and novelist, best known for his work on Star Trek

- Born: Eugene Lee Coon; January 7, 1924; Beatrice, Nebraska, U.S.
- Died: July 8, 1973 (aged 49); Los Angeles, California, U.S.
- Occupations: Screenwriter, television producer
- Writing career
- Pen name: Lee Cronin
- Genres: Television, science fiction, film, fiction

Eugene Lee Coon (January 7, 1924 – July 8, 1973) was an American screenwriter, television producer, and novelist. He is best remembered for his work on the original Star Trek as a screenwriter, story editor, and showrunner from the middle of the series' first season to the middle of the second. Along with series creator Gene Roddenberry, Coon is given credit for the show's idealistic tone and for creating several key story and world-building elements that would become important parts of the ongoing franchise.

== Life and career ==
The eldest son of U.S. Army Sgt. Merle Jack "Pug" Coon and decorator Erma Gay Noakes, Eugene Lee Coon was born in Beatrice, Nebraska, on January 7, 1924. At four years of age, young Gene showed talent, singing on the radio at WOAW-AM in Omaha. He knew 24 songs, including one in French and one in German. In his youth, Coon was a member of the Gage County 4-H Club and the Boy Scouts of America. He later attended Omaha Technical High School and participated in Junior Reserve Officers' Training Corps, also playing in the school band. During this time, he was also a teenaged newscaster for KWBE (AM) in Beatrice. Coon later moved, with his parents and younger brothers, Merle Jack Coon Jr. and Bloise Newell Coon, to Glendale, California. Another brother died at 10 years old when they still lived in Beatrice. His father found employment there working with poultry, and Coon transferred to Glendale High School.

During World War II, Coon served stateside in the United States Marine Corps from 1942 to 1946. Thereafter, he remained in the Marines as a reservist while studying radio communications at Glendale Junior College, where he performed in a production of The Night of January 16th. Following additional studies at the University of Iowa, he returned to active duty during the Korean War era in 1950, ultimately attaining the rank of sergeant. He received additional training as a war reporter, and ran a pharmacy and built houses. He wrote about many of his experiences in the novels Meanwhile Back at the Front and The Short End of the Stick.

Upon his demobilization in 1952, Coon found work first as a radio newscaster before turning to freelance writing under the mentorship of Los Angeles Times reporter Gene Sherman. From 1954 to 1959, Coon operated a pharmacy at the intersection of Beverly Boulevard and North Ardmore Avenue; during this period, Sherman covered his pharmacy exploits in the page 2 "Cityside" column for the newspaper. Sherman also allowed Coon to have a guest spot promoting Meanwhile Back at the Front in the column Sherman wrote for The Farmer's Market, using the pen name Dick Kidson.

Beginning in 1956, Coon was primarily involved in scripting teleplays for popular Western and action television shows, including Dragnet (1951), Wagon Train (1957), Maverick (1957), and Bonanza (1959). At Universal in the early 1960s, he turned McHale's Navy (1962) from a one-hour drama into a successful 30-minute sitcom. Together with the writer Les Colodny, Coon floated the idea for The Munsters (1964), as a satirical take on The Donna Reed Show (1958), to MCA chairman Lew Wasserman. The result of this last, whose format was worked out by Allan Burns and Chris Hayward and whose characters and situations were developed by Norm Liebman and Ed Haas, was yet another hit show, under the creative auspices of Joe Connelly and Bob Mosher. MCA, then the parent company of Universal Studios, produced the show through its Revue TV and Kayro-Vue Productions banners.

=== Star Trek ===
His Wagon Train scripts contained strong moral lessons concerning personal redemption and opposing war, and he later repeated very similar themes in his Star Trek scripts. (The latter series, though it owed much to C. S. Forester's novels about Horatio Hornblower and Jonathan Swift's satire Gulliver's Travels, was sold to the NBC television network using the unofficial nickname of "Wagon Train to the stars".) Coon joined the original Star Trek series during its first season; David Gerrold credited him with being a skilled showrunner before Coon left in the middle of the second season. Coon was responsible for many rewrites of Star Trek scripts.

His credited creations for Star Trek include the Klingons and the Organian Peace Treaty (in "Errand of Mercy"), Khan Noonien Singh (in "Space Seed", where he adapted a Carey Wilber story), Zefram Cochrane (in "Metamorphosis"), the advancement and the definition of the Prime Directive in "The Return of the Archons" and "Bread and Circuses", respectively, the official naming of the United Federation of Planets itself in "Arena" (in which he inadvertently plagiarized a Fredric Brown story), and the official naming of Starfleet Command in "Court Martial". Since he also had the responsibility of revising scripts, he worked uncredited on many other episodes. He also mentored the young Gerrold and helped him polish the script for the episode "The Trouble with Tribbles". Other popular Star Trek episodes that he wrote included "The Devil in the Dark", "A Taste of Armageddon", and "A Piece of the Action". He is credited with much of the character development of Star Trek's characters, much of the humor of Star Trek, and the "bickersonesque" disagreements between Spock and McCoy.

Following arguments with Roddenberry over the tone of the installment "Bread and Circuses", partly a satire on the medium of television, Coon left the writing staff and designated John Meredyth Lucas as showrunner. After announcing to Lucas that he was leaving, Lucas, who had already written the installments "The Changeling" and "Patterns of Force" for the program, quoted Coon as saying, "Why the hell don't you take over? You produced The Fugitive and Ben Casey and that shit". Lucas suspected Coon may have been secretly diagnosed with cancer, but he never definitely learned whether this was the case.

Coon contributed to four scripts for the third season under the pseudonym of Lee Cronin, as he was by then under contract to Universal Studios.

=== After Star Trek ===
After his work on Star Trek, Coon produced the Universal Studios series It Takes a Thief, starring Robert Wagner, during which he mentored Glen A. Larson. He also continued to write for Kung Fu and The Streets of San Francisco. In 1973, he served as co-writer with Gene Roddenberry on the NBC-TV movie The Questor Tapes. The movie was to serve as a pilot for a new series, but Roddenberry balked at a decision by NBC to eliminate the character of Jerry Robinson, Questor's human companion/mentor. (Coon died before the pilot aired in early 1974.)

Although Coon turned down the opportunity to work on Star Trek: The Animated Series, he continued to work with Roddenberry, co-writing Genesis II and the proposal for Spectre. He also founded UniTel Associates, one of the earliest production companies aimed at the home video market.

Coon was known as one of the fastest writers in Hollywood, and he often rewrote a script for shooting overnight or over a weekend. He had a dry sense of humor, as reflected in his two novels. After years of separation, Coon again found his first love, model Jackie Mitchell. In 1967, he divorced his wife Joy so that he could be with Jackie, with whom he spent the last five years of his life.

== Death and tributes ==
A chain smoker of cigarillos for most of his life, the man whom fellow writer/producer Glen A. Larson referred to as "the spirit and soul of Star Trek" died in July 1973 from complications of lung and throat cancer at the age of 49, just one week after being diagnosed.

D. C. Fontana dedicated her novelization of The Questor Tapes to him. William Shatner dedicated a chapter in his 1993 memoir Star Trek Memories to him, titled "The Unsung Hero", in which he attributed many aspects of Star Trek to him. Leonard Nimoy did the same in his own memoir (I Am Spock), as did Herbert F. Solow and Robert H. Justman with Inside Star Trek: The Real Story. In the closing credits of the 1999 Star Trek tribute film Free Enterprise, Gene Coon is referred to as "The Forgotten Gene" in recognition of his contributions to Star Trek, as well as his professional collaboration and personal relationship with his collaborator, Star Trek creator Gene Roddenberry.

== Works ==
=== Television ===
He worked as a writer on Dragnet, Bonanza, Zorro, Peter Gunn, Mr Lucky, Have Gun – Will Travel, Wagon Train, The Wild Wild West, The Four Just Men, Combat!, and McHale's Navy. Later, his role was producer for The Wild Wild West.

Year	Show	#	Role	Alias	Aired
1956	Medic	5 episodes	Writer		
1957	The Restless Gun	1 episode	Writer		
1957	Suspicion	1 episode	Writer		
1957-58	Schlitz Playhouse	2 episodes	Writer		
1958	Rescue 8	1 episode	Writer		
1958	Cimarron City	1 episode	Writer		
1958	Zorro	2 episodes	Writer		
1958-63	Wagon Train	24 episodes	Writer		
1959	Maverick	1 episode	Writer		
1959	Have Gun – Will Travel	1 episode	Writer		
1959	Dragnet	1 episode	Writer		
1959	The Four Just Men	1 episode	Writer		
1959	Lock Up	1 episode	Writer		
1959	Riverboat	1 episode	Writer		
1959	General Electric Theater	1 episode	Writer		
1959-60	Mr. Lucky	10 episodes	Writer		
1959-61	Bonanza	4 episodes	Writer		
1960	The Rebel	1 episode	Writer		
1960	Peter Gunn	1 episode	Writer		
1960	Dan Raven	1 episode	Writer		
1961	Acapulco	2 episodes	Writer		
1961	Whispering Smith	1 episode	Writer		
1961	Ichabod and Me	1 episode	Writer		
1962	Follow the Sun	1 episode	Writer		
1962	Rawhide	1 episode	Writer		
1962	McHale's Navy	2 episodes	Writer		
1963	Alcoa Premiere	1 episode	Writer		
1964	Destry	3 episodes	Writer, Producer		
1965	Bob Hope Presents the Chrysler Theatre	1 episode	Writer		
1965	My Favorite Martian	1 episode	Writer		
1965-67	Laredo	6 episodes	Writer		
1965-71	The Virginian	2 episodes	Writer, producer		
1966	The F.B.I.	1 episode	Writer		
1966	Combat!	3 episodes	Writer		
1966	The Wild Wild West	1 episode	Writer, producer		
1967-69	Star Trek: The Original Series	13 episodes	Writer, producer	Lee Cronin	
1968	Off to See the Wizard	2 episodes	Writer		
1968-69	It Takes a Thief	6 episodes	Writer, producer		
1969	The Name of The Game	1 episode	Writer, producer		
1969	Then Came Bronson	1 episode	Writer	Lee Cronin	
1970	Paris 7000	1 episode	Writer		
1970	The Immortal	1 episode	Writer		
1970-71	The Mod Squad	1 episode	Writer		
1971	Nichols	1 episode	Writer		
1971	Bearcats!	1 episode	Writer		
1972	The Sixth Sense	1 episode	Writer		
1973	Hawkins	1 episode	Writer		
1973	Kung Fu	1 episode	Writer		
1973	Assignment Vienna	2 episodes	Writer		
1974	The Streets of San Francisco	1 episode	Writer		March 14, 1974 ("Death and the Favored Few")

=== Films ===
- The Girl in the Kremlin (1957)
- Man in the Shadow (1957)
- No Name on the Bullet (1959)
- The Raiders (1963)
- The Killers (1964)
- First to Fight (1967)
- Journey to Shiloh (1968)
- The Questor Tapes (1974)

=== Books ===
By Gene L. Coon

- Meanwhile Back at the Front (New York: Crown, 1961. 309 pp.) is a novel dealing with the improbable exploits of the Public Information Section of the 1st Marine Division during the Korean War.
- The Short End (published 1964) is a novel dealing with the lives and problems of American troops stationed along the DMZ in Korea after the war ended. It includes how they got along with and were treated by the native Koreans, focusing on sex and cultural clashes. It is also one of the earliest publications to discuss the drug problems of the bored occupation troops and how commanders dealt with them. The novel was republished posthumously as The Short End of the Stick (1975) with new cover artwork.
