= Andromeda (TV series) =

Space opera television series

- Also known as: Gene Roddenberry's Andromeda
- Genre: Science fiction Action
- Created by: Gene Roddenberry
- Developed by: Robert Hewitt Wolfe
- Showrunners: Robert Hewitt Wolfe; Robert Engels
- Starring: Kevin Sorbo; Lisa Ryder; Keith Hamilton Cobb; Lexa Doig; Laura Bertram; Gordon Michael Woolvett; Brent Stait; Steve Bacic; Brandy Ledford
- Composer: Matthew McCauley
- Countries of origin: Canada; United States
- Original language: English
- No. of seasons: 5
- No. of episodes: 110 (list of episodes)

Production
- Executive producers: Allan Eastman; Majel Barrett; Jay Firestone; Adam Haight; Eric Gold; Kevin Sorbo; Robert Engels
- Running time: 60 minutes
- Production companies: Andromeda Productions; BLT Productions; Fireworks Entertainment; MBR Productions; Tribune Entertainment

Original release
- Network: Global; Syndicated; Sci-Fi Channel (2004–2005)
- Release: October 2, 2000 – May 13, 2005

Andromeda (formally titled Gene Roddenberry's Andromeda) is a space opera television series, based on unused material by Gene Roddenberry, developed by Robert Hewitt Wolfe, and produced by Roddenberry's widow, Majel Barrett. The series follows Kevin Sorbo as Captain Dylan Hunt of the Systems Commonwealth, an intergalactic government that presided over an extended period of peace and prosperity until its destruction from a rebellion led by the warmongering Nietzscheans and parasitic Magog. The series premiered on October 2, 2000, and ended on May 13, 2005.

Andromeda was filmed in Vancouver, British Columbia, Canada and produced by Andromeda Productions, Tribune Entertainment, Fireworks Entertainment and MBR Productions. In Canada, the show aired on Global Television Network (Fireworks' parent company) and ran in first-run broadcast syndication in the United States.

Andromeda is one of two television series (alongside Earth: Final Conflict) produced after Roddenberry's death based on concepts he had created as early as the 1960s and 1970s; Roddenberry died in 1991, nine years prior to the series premiere. The name Dylan Hunt had previously been used for the hero of two television pilots Roddenberry had produced in the mid-1970s – Genesis II and Planet Earth – all of which shared a similar dystopian post-apocalyptic premise.

== Premise ==
Thousands of years in the future, the Systems Commonwealth is a constitutional monarchy spanning the Milky Way, Triangulum, and Andromeda galaxies, with the capital of Tarn-Vedra near Andromeda's core. The Commonwealth is at war with the Magog, a parasitic humanoid species spreading across the galaxies. Peace talks led the Commonwealth to cede a key world to the Magog, that of the Nietzscheans; in response, the Nietzscheans secretly attempted to usurp control of the Commonwealth.

Dylan Hunt is the captain of the Commonwealth starship Andromeda Ascendant. Its computer is a powerful artificial intelligence which Dylan has nicknamed "Andromeda" or "Rommie". Caught in a surprise attack in the first engagement of the Nietzschean uprising, the Andromeda is crippled, prompting Dylan to order the crew to evacuate. During the attack, Dylan's Nietzschean first officer, Gaheris Rhade, betrays Dylan and attempts to kill him. Dylan kills Gaheris as Andromeda is caught at the edge of the event horizon of a black hole, freezing both in time.

303 years later, in CY 10087 (approx 5167 AD), the Andromeda is pulled from the event horizon by the crew of the salvage ship Eureka Maru, captained by con-artist and expert pilot Beka Valentine, super-genius engineer Seamus Zelazny Harper, doctor and alien of unknown origin Trance Gemini, and pacifist Magog Rev Bem (the salvage crew's beneficiary also secretly brings Nietzschean mercenary Tyr Anasazi). The Systems Commonwealth has fallen, and the era known as The Long Night has begun. Hunt recruits the crew to join him in restoring the Systems Commonwealth and to "rekindle the light of civilization".

== Characters ==
Season one cast

- Dylan Hunt – played by Kevin Sorbo, captain of the Andromeda Ascendant.
- Rebecca "Beka" Valentine – played by Lisa Ryder, captain of the Eureka Maru and first officer on Andromeda.
- Tyr Anasazi – played by Keith Hamilton Cobb, weapons officer (seasons 1–3; guest season 4).
- Seamus Zelazny Harper – played by Gordon Michael Woolvett, chief engineer.
- Trance Gemini – played by Laura Bertram, doctor and life support officer.
- Rev Bem (Reverend "Red Plague" Behemial Far Traveler) – played by Brent Stait, science officer (seasons 1–2; guest seasons 3–4).
- Andromeda (Rommie) – played by Lexa Doig, ship's artificial intelligence and android avatar.
- Telemachus Rhade – played by Steve Bacic, weapons officer (seasons 4–5).
- Doyle – played by Brandy Ledford, Andromeda Ascendant's second android avatar (season 5).

== Andromeda universe ==
=== Slipstream ===
Slipstream is the primary mode of travel for ships in the Andromeda universe, and the only known method of traveling faster than the speed of light. The Vedran discovery of the slipstream was instrumental in the formation of their interstellar empire, which became the precursor of the Systems Commonwealth.

Slipstream cannot be navigated by AIs (they only have a 50% chance of choosing the correct path). Only organic pilots can "sense" a way to their destination (they have a 99% chance of choosing the correct path), and although AIs are fitted on all large ships, they always require an organic pilot for interstellar travel. It is implied that the process of choosing a path is what makes it the correct one.

A function of slipstream is that apparent objective velocities are extremely variable, as it enables travel across millions of light years seemingly as swiftly as traveling between neighboring stars only tens of light years apart. Further, slipstream is a non-linear method of travel; the fastest or safest way to slipstream between two points, though they might be in the same galaxy, may involve slipstreaming to another galaxy entirely. The more frequently used routes are often easier, faster and more predictable. Locations relatively nearby in ordinary space may be difficult or impossible to access via slipstream.

=== Systems Commonwealth ===
The Systems Commonwealth was a huge utopian civilization, spanning three major galaxies of the Local Group. It was founded by the Vedrans, the first race to discover slipstream, who initially used it to conquer the Andromeda Galaxy. After a long and bitter war of attrition with the major powers of the Triangulum Galaxy, the Vedran Empire was reorganized as the democratic Systems Commonwealth. The Commonwealth served as a peaceful intergalactic government for almost 10,000 years until the Nietzschean revolt.

=== Major star systems ===
- Hephaestus, a system with a significant Nietzschean population, devastated by a rogue black hole in the pilot episode and the place of Dylan's frozen imprisonment in time for 300 years.
- Mobius, a barren world with underground cities. Mobius was ruled by ruthless dictators for many centuries but joined the New Commonwealth when its leader, the "Great Compass" Venetri, resigned.
- San-Ska-Re, a Than homeworld and a major power in post-Fall Known Worlds. Did not actually appear on screen.
- Seefra, a mysterious artificial system of nine planets and two suns where Dylan and his crew were transported after the Battle of Arkology.
- Tarazed, a world with significant human and loyalist Nietzschean populations; it survived the Long Night largely unscathed. It became the first capital of the New Commonwealth. Birthplace of Telemachus Rhade. Tarazed was described in the series as being located in another galaxy and therefore is not intended to be equivalent to a non-fictional star of the same name.
- Tarn-Vedra, the capital of the Old Systems Commonwealth and Vedran homeworld. All slipstream routes to Tarn-Vedra vanished soon after the Nietzschean rebellion, contributing to the ensuing chaos. Dylan was born on Tarn-Vedra. One of his motivations for restoring the Commonwealth is the search for his own lost home.
- Earth was ravaged by the Nietzschean occupation and Magog assaults during the Long Night. Harper was born and acquired his notable survival skills there.
- Arkology, a huge space station with a pacifist population.

=== Major races ===
- Avatars of the Suns, humanoid forms of stars with great powers. They are immortal and can travel through time and space, affecting events and people as they wish.
- Humans make up about 70% of the Known Worlds population. Subspecies with minor genetic enhancements (like the Inari) are common.
- Kalderans, a xenophobic reptilian race that once rivaled the Vedrans.
- Magog, a race of savage semi-intelligent alien killers, feared throughout the Known Worlds. The Magog have to kill and eat fresh meat to sustain themselves and to lay eggs in sentient beings to procreate.
- Nietzscheans, a group of superior humans who believed in self-improvement via genetic engineering and intense competition. They left Earth thousands of years ago and evolved into a separate subspecies (Homo sapiens invictus) that colonized many worlds throughout the galaxies. Nietzscheans are responsible for the Fall of the Systems Commonwealth; however, they failed to replace it with the Nietzschean Empire due to constant betrayals and conflicts between different Nietzschean Prides.
- Nightsiders, rat-like humanoids with poor vision, but highly developed hearing. Their reproductive cycle is very damaging to the environment, as their early larval stage is an aquatic creature that eats anything it comes across.
- Paradine, a highly evolved form of the Vedrans, who look like ordinary humans. The Paradine apparently had a special role in dealing with the Avatars of the Suns and the Route of Ages, but they are all but extinct now.
- Perseids, a highly intelligent race of alien scientists and bureaucrats.
- Pyrian, a grotesque, tentacled orb like species who are one of the most powerful enemies of the Commonwealth.
- Than-Thre-Kull (Than), a tough and highly intelligent and civilized insectoid race divided into various function-specific castes.
- Vedrans, the first intelligent race to discover the slipstream that connects the entire universe. The Vedrans went on to conquer the Known Worlds, building the Vedran Empire. The Empire was plagued by internal conflicts and eventually was peacefully transformed into the Systems Commonwealth.

=== Other races ===
- Bokor, dangerous parasites that possess other species in order to survive, spreading through physical contact. Inside their shells, the Bokor are practically invulnerable to any type of weapon, ranging to energy, melee or bullets. However, they are vulnerable to electricity. Their existence in the Known Worlds is abhorred by the Than, who attack any vessel carrying them. For normal humanoids, it takes a while for the Bokor to destroy their neural functions and take over.
- Ogami, a race of brutish pirates and mercenaries.

=== Organizations ===
- Collectors, The Commonwealth's keepers of secret history.
- Genites, a high-tech, numerous and well-organized intergalactic group whose aim is to rid the universe of genetically engineered beings, especially the Nietzschean Prides, who brought about the downfall of humanity.
- High Guard, the main military force of the Systems Commonwealth.
- Tech Police, the brutish anti-tech enforcement on Seefra-1.
- Templar, a group of men and women who sought to restore order after the Fall. They were founded by High Guard Admiral Constanza Stark.

== Production ==
Majel Barrett and Tribune Entertainment began developing series from Gene Roddenberry's archive in 1997. Robert Hewitt Wolfe was brought in to develop the series. Fireworks Entertainment was brought in to co-finance and for international distribution. In early 1999, actor Kevin Sorbo was recruited to star in the series while he starred in Hercules: The Legendary Journeys. Eric Gold, and Barrett were also to be executive producers and Wolfe as co-executive producer. Bette Chadwick was in charge of casting, while visual effects were initially handled by Lost Boys Studios and Northwest Imaging & FX. By September 9, 1999, Tribune had stations committed for two years in 24 of the top 30 markets with 22 Tribune and 38 Sinclair stations for a 60% national clearance giving the series a green light. The show was offered barter terms with an eight national/six local advertising split.

The Andromeda theme music used in season one was composed by Alex Lifeson, guitarist for the Canadian progressive rock band Rush.

Andromeda's first episode was aired on syndication in the United States on October 2, 2000 while being carried on Global Television Network in Canada. Tribune Broadcasting station signed on to carry the show in its first season. On January 20, 2002, Andromeda was renewed for two seasons, its third and fourth, having gotten two year deals with stations in 39 out the top 40 markets. By January 31, 2003, the show was renewed for its fourth season, 2003–2004, in 148 markets representing 88% of the United States. The show was averaging 2.2 rating for the 2002–2003 season, third behind Stargate SG-1. For the 2003–2004 season, the show is one of only four first-run scripted series in syndication along with its Tribune stable mate, Mutant X.

On January 14, 2004, the Sci-Fi Channel made a deal for the show and all its episodes plus fellow Tribune syndicated but discontinued show Beastmaster. In March, the cable channel would start showing season four episodes which would then be seen in syndication seven to ten days later. With the deal, the series was renewed for its fifth and final season. The show began its run on Sci-Fi with a re-airing of the two-hour pilot episode.

On April 23, 2004, CanWest Global Communications announced the closure of Fireworks Entertainment and placing Fireworks' library up for sale. With Fireworks being the primary production company, this was effectively the show's cancellation notice. However, two of Fireworks' shows were shifted to fellow CanWest subsidiary Global Television. Tribune had ordered the show and Mutant X into production for the 2004–2005 season under the show's contract options. Fireworks Entertainment took Tribune to court to get an order releasing them from production and financing the two series.

=== Robert Hewitt Wolfe's departure ===
During filming of season two, series developer and executive producer Robert Hewitt Wolfe announced he had been released from the show's production and was replaced by Robert Engels. The change was purportedly to make the show more episodic and open to casual viewing since Wolfe's version—although episodic—had many plotlines and story arcs. After the show's final episode aired, Wolfe wrote and published a one-act play entitled "Coda" that explained his intended plans for the show without contradicting the aired episodes. This play is now hosted on Drive Back the Night – An Andromeda Podcast.

In discussion on his website's forums and various interviews, Wolfe has elaborated that he was released from the production staff after he refused to shift the show's focus more onto Kevin Sorbo's character, Dylan Hunt, by essentially making all of the show's episodes Hunt-centric. The events of the episode "Ouroboros", the final episode written by Wolfe, introduced the last major changes that Wolfe was willing to make to the series.

== Home media ==
By 2003, ADV Films had home video/DVD rights for the show in the USA. The company released the entire series on DVD in region 1 between 2003 and 2006. In December 2003, ADV released Season 3, Collection 2. On October 3, 2006, they released a complete series DVD box set known as Andromeda: The Slipstream Collection.

Alliance Home Entertainment (under license from CanWest Global Communications) has released all five seasons on DVD in Canada only.

In Region 2, Revelation Films has released the first four seasons on DVD in the United Kingdom. The fifth and final season was released on November 24, 2014.

On January 26, 2015, Revelation Films released a complete series set on DVD in the United Kingdom.

In Region 4, Beyond Home Entertainment has released all five seasons on DVD in Australia. In 2007/2008, they re-released all five seasons in new collector's editions that featured new packaging and all episodes were digitally re-mastered in widescreen format.

A region B Blu-ray release of the first season was released on June 24, 2013, in the United Kingdom, with the next two seasons following by the end of that year.

The all-region Blu-ray release of the complete box set of all five seasons was released on September 19, 2016.

== Reception ==
The first season received mixed to negative reviews. Starburst described Andromeda as a "delightfully motley cast of characters, and the scripts by Wolfe and his writing team are brimming with witty interplay." A mixed review from Variety says Andromeda "could offer a few campy laughs on a weekend afternoon". In a retrospective, Digital Spy remarks "this show hasn't exactly aged that well... but if you remotely like sci-fi, we also bet you'll find yourself sucked into this nostalgia-fest in no time".

Andromeda received negative reviews from the Los Angeles Times ("Don't expect much excitement... 'Andromeda' isn't intended to be taken too seriously, but that doesn't excuse its penchant for dopey dialogue"), Entertainment Weekly ("After surviving a hilariously bad slow motion fight sequence.. Sorbo meets up with a band of misfit scavengers who may not be as bad as they seem, but make up for it by being twice as annoying"), Common Sense Media ("this series lacks the spark that made Star Trek so much fun. The politics sometimes seem overly confusing, and some of the characters are thinly developed"), SciFiNow ("It's a cliche but decent enough... but the problem is that Andromeda falls into Star Trek: Voyager territory by playing it safe and not doing enough to develop its characters") and Pittsburgh Post-Gazette ("it's kiddie-minded science-fiction with average special effects... and a set that was clearly built on a lower budget than the 'Star Trek' shows.").

== Awards ==
Andromeda was nominated for 39 awards at organizational events spanning the years 2001 to 2006. The nominations comprised six Academy of Science Fiction, Fantasy & Horror Films, USA awards, five Chicago International Film Festival awards, eight Gemini Awards, fifteen Leo Awards, and five WorldFest-Houston International Film Festival awards. The show won 18 of those awards.

Awards
Year	Awards	Category	Nominee	Episode	Result
2001	Academy of Science Fiction, Fantasy and Horror Films	Best Syndicated/Cable Television Series	Andromeda	—	Nominated
2001	Academy of Science Fiction, Fantasy and Horror Films	Best Actor on Television	Kevin Sorbo	—	Nominated
2001	Gemini Awards	Best Performance by an Actress in a Featured Supporting Role in a Dramatic Series	Lisa Ryder	—	Nominated
2001	Gemini Awards	Best Visual Effects	Bruce MacDougall, James Kawano, Geoff Anderson, Tom Tennisco, Joe Farrell, Jim Finn, Darren Marcoux, Roberto Biagi	—	Nominated
2001	Leo Awards	Best Musical Score of a Dramatic Series	Matthew McCauley	Music of a Distant Drum	Won
2001	Leo Awards	Best Visual Effects in a Dramatic Series	Todd Liddiard	—	Won
2001	Leo Awards	Best Visual Effects of Dramatic Series	Jim Finn, Roberto Biagi, Tom Tennisco, Geoff Anderson, Jamie Kawano, Paul Cox, Joe Farrell, Peter Mastalyr, Bruce MacDougall, Mladen Miholjcic, Noel Wright, Jean-Paul Ledoux	The Mathematics of Tears	Won
2001	Leo Awards	Best Picture Editing of Dramatic Series	Gordon Rempel	Angel Dark, Demon Bright	Nominated
2001	Leo Awards	Editing, Dramatic Series	Eric Hill	Music of a Distant Drum	Won
2001	WorldFest-Houston International Film Festival awards	Television and Cable Production – Directing – Television	David Winning	The Banks of the Lethe	Won
2002	Academy of Science Fiction, Fantasy and Horror Films	Best Syndicated/Cable Television Series	Andromeda	—	Nominated
2002	Academy of Science Fiction, Fantasy and Horror Films	Best Actress on Television	Lexa Doig	—	Nominated
2002	Gemini Awards	Best Achievement in Make-Up	Ryan Nicholson, Francesca von Zimmermann	—	Won
2002	Gemini Awards	Best Performance by an Actress in a Guest Role in a Dramatic Series	Kristin Lehman	—	Nominated
2002	Gemini Awards	Best Photography in a Dramatic Program or Series	Gordon Verheul	—	Nominated
2002	Gemini Awards	Best Visual Effects	Geoff Anderson, Jim Finn, Roberto Biagi, Tom Tennisco	—	Nominated
2002	Leo Awards	Dramatic Series: Best Visual Effects	Jim Finn	Its Hour Come 'Round at Last	Nominated
2002	WorldFest-Houston International Film Festival awards	Television and Cable Production – Directing – Television	David Winning	Double or Nothingness	Won
2002	WorldFest-Houston International Film Festival awards	Television and Cable Production – Directing – Television	David Winning	Machinery of the Mind	Won
2003	Academy of Science Fiction, Fantasy and Horror Films	Best Syndicated/Cable Television Series	Andromeda	—	Nominated
2003	Chicago International Film Festival awards	Special Achievement in Direction	David Winning	A Heart for Falsehood Framed	Won
2003	Gemini Awards	Best Achievement in Make-Up	Ryan Nicholson, Francesca von Zimmermann	—	Nominated
2003	Leo Awards	Dramatic Series: Best Visual Effects	Jim Finn, Paul Cox, Todd Liddiard, Peter Mastalyr, Robert Appleby	The Tunnel at the End of the Light	Won
2003	Leo Awards	Dramatic Series: Best Supporting Performance – Female	Laura Bertram	The Dark Backward	Nominated
2004	Academy of Science Fiction, Fantasy and Horror Films	Best Syndicated/Cable Television Series	Andromeda	—	Nominated
2004	Chicago International Film Festival awards	Best Dramatic Series	David Winning	Double or Nothingness	Won
2004	Chicago International Film Festival awards	Best Dramatic Series	David Winning	Machinery of the Mind	Won
2004	Chicago International Film Festival awards	Special Achievement in Direction	David Winning	Double or Nothingness	Won
2004	Gemini Awards	Best Visual Effects	Bruce Turner, Peter Hunt, Simon Lacey, Grant Lindsay	A Symmetry of Imperfection	Won
2004	WorldFest-Houston International Film Festival awards	Television and Cable Production – TV Series – Dramatic	David Winning	A Heart For Falsehood Frame	Won
2005	Chicago International Film Festival awards	Special Achievement in Direction	David Winning	Double or Nothingness	Won
2005	Leo Awards	Dramatic Series: Best Make-Up	Francesca von Zimmermann	Moonlight Becomes You	Nominated
2005	Leo Awards	Dramatic Series: Best Overall Sound	Jeff Jackman, Michael Thomas, Roger Morris, Gordon Anderson	The Dissonant Interval	Nominated
2005	Leo Awards	Dramatic Series: Best Sound Editing	Jeff Jackman, Chester Biolowas, Roger Morris	The Dissonant Interval	Nominated
2005	Leo Awards	Dramatic Series: Best Visual Effects	Bruce Turner, Simon Lacey, Lindsay Grant, Ben Funk, Nick Michaeleski	The Dissonant Interval	Nominated
2005	Leo Awards	Dramatic Series: Best Visual Effects	Bruce Turner, Simon Lacey, Lindsay Grant, Ben Funk, Nick Michaeleski	Through a Glass Darkly	Nominated
2005	WorldFest-Houston International Film Festival awards	Television and Cable Production – TV Series – Dramatic	David Winning	The Banks of the Lethe	Won
2006	Leo Awards	Best Sound Editing in a Dramatic Series	Jeff Jackman, Chester Biolowas, Rick Senechal, Ian Mackie, Don Harrison	—	Won
2006	Leo Awards	Best Overall Sound in a Dramatic Series	Paul Michael Thomas, Ken Biehl, Jeff Jackman, Gordon Anderson	—	Nominated

== See also ==
- Strange New World (film)
