= Campus VFX =

Location
- 1825 Victoria Diversion; Vancouver, British Columbia, V5N 2K2; Canada; 49°15′15″N 123°4′2″W

Information
- Type: Private
- Mottoes: "We are the studio that teaches."
- Established: 2006
- Campus: Urban
- Website: campusvfx.com

Campus VFX (formerly Lost Boys School of Visual Effects) is a PTIB-accredited private academy for visual effects and artistry, located in Vancouver, British Columbia, Canada.

== History ==
Campus VFX was founded in 2006 by Mark Bénard as Lost Boys School of Visual Effects in Comox, British Columbia. Bénard previously worked in the visual effects industry and later taught at Vancouver Film School before establishing the school.

=== Lost Boys Studios ===
The school developed out of Lost Boys Studios, a Vancouver-based visual effects production company founded by Bénard in 1997. The studio produced visual effects for television, feature films, music videos, advertising and video game cinematics, with projects including The Snow Walker and Neverland, as well as commercial work for companies such as Coca-Cola and Pepsi.

=== Transition to private academy ===
Following the studio's closure around 2005, Bénard established Lost Boys Learning, subsequently known as the Lost Boys School of Visual Effects. The school developed an educational approach based on the production workflows and practical experience of the original studio, combining professional visual effects training with a production-oriented learning environment. The institution subsequently evolved into what is now known as Campus VFX.

The school relocated to the Gastown district of Vancouver in 2011. In 2015, it moved to its current location at 1825 Victoria Diversion in Vancouver.

In 2018, the school was included in The Hollywood Reporter's list of top visual effects schools. The same year, student work from the school was ranked second in the visual effects category by The Rookies.

== See also ==
- Higher education in British Columbia
