= Majel Barrett =

American actress (1932–2008)

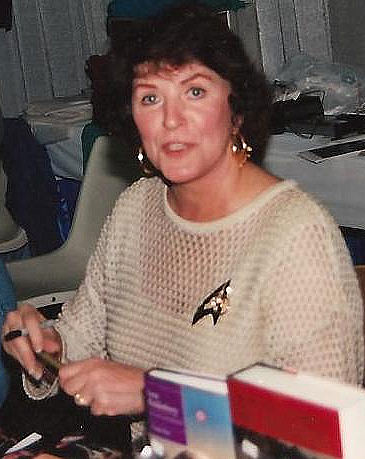
- Barrett in 2006
- Born: Majel Leigh Hudec; February 23, 1932; Cleveland, Ohio, U.S. (Note: While many sources state that Barrett was born in Cleveland (e.g., Associated Press, The Daily Telegraph, Roddenberry Entertainment and CBS Studios), some sources say Columbus (e.g., Cleveland Plain Dealer, Los Angeles Times and, curiously, CBS Studios).)
- Died: December 18, 2008 (aged 76); Bel Air, California, U.S.
- Other name: M. Leigh Hudec
- Occupation: Actress
- Years active: 1957–2008
- Notable credit(s): Christine Chapel, Lwaxana Troi, and voice of ship's computer in the Star Trek franchise
- Spouse: Gene Roddenberry (m. 1969; died 1991)
- Children: Rod Roddenberry

Majel Barrett-Roddenberry (/ˈmeɪdʒəl/ MAY-jəl; born Majel Leigh Hudec; February 23, 1932 – December 18, 2008) was an American actress. She was best known for her roles as various characters in the Star Trek franchise: Nurse Christine Chapel (in the original Star Trek series, Star Trek: The Animated Series, and two films of the franchise), Number One (also in the original series), Lwaxana Troi (on Star Trek: The Next Generation and Star Trek: Deep Space Nine), and the voice of most onboard computer interfaces throughout the series from 1966 to 2008.

She married Star Trek creator Gene Roddenberry in 1969. As his wife and given her relationship with Star Trek—participating in some way in every series during her lifetime—she is sometimes referred to as "the First Lady of Star Trek."

== Early life and education ==
Barrett was born in Cleveland, Ohio. She began taking acting classes as a child. She graduated from Shaker Heights High School in Shaker Heights, Ohio. She went to the University of Miami in Coral Gables, Florida, then had some stage roles and arrived in Hollywood. Her father, William Hudec, was a Cleveland police officer. He was killed in the line of duty while driving a police ambulance which was struck by an Erie Passenger Train at East 91st Street and Loren Avenue on August 30, 1955. The tragedy occurred while Barrett was touring with an off-Broadway road company.

== Career ==
Barrett was briefly seen in Will Success Spoil Rock Hunter? (1957) in an ad parody at the beginning of the film, and had roles in a few films, including Love in a Goldfish Bowl (1961), Sylvia (1965), A Guide for the Married Man (1967), and Track of Thunder (1967). She worked at the Desilu Studios on several TV shows, including Bonanza, The Untouchables, The Lucy Show, and The Lieutenant (produced by Gene Roddenberry). She received training in comedy from Lucille Ball. In 1960, she played Gwen Rutherford on Leave It to Beaver.

=== Star Trek ===
In various roles, Barrett participated in every incarnation of the popular science fiction Star Trek franchise produced during her lifetime, including live-action and animated versions, television and cinema, and nearly all of the time periods in which the various series have been set.

She first appeared in Star Trek's initial pilot, "The Cage" (1964), as the USS Enterprise's unnamed first officer, "Number One". Barrett was romantically involved with Roddenberry, whose marriage was on the verge of failing at the time, and the idea of having an otherwise unknown woman in a leading role just because she was the producer's girlfriend is said to have infuriated NBC network executives who insisted that Roddenberry recast the role. William Shatner corroborated this in Star Trek Memories, and added that female viewers at test screenings hated the character as well. Shatner said that female viewers felt she was "pushy" and "annoying" and also thought that "Number One shouldn't be trying so hard to fit in with the men." Barrett often joked that Roddenberry, given the choice between keeping Mr. Spock (whom the network also hated) or the woman character, "kept the Vulcan and married the woman, 'cause he didn't think Leonard [Nimoy] would have it the other way around".

When Roddenberry was casting for the second Star Trek pilot, "Where No Man Has Gone Before", she changed her last name from Hudec to Barrett and wore a blonde wig for the role of nurse Christine Chapel, a frequently recurring character, who was introduced in "The Naked Time", the sixth new episode recorded, and was known for her unrequited affection for the dispassionate Spock. Her first appearance as Chapel in film dailies prompted NBC executive Jerry Stanley to yodel "Well, well—look who's back!"

In an early scene in Star Trek: The Motion Picture, viewers are informed that she has now become Doctor Chapel, a role which she reprised briefly in Star Trek IV: The Voyage Home, as Commander Chapel. Barrett provided several voices for Star Trek: The Animated Series, including those of Nurse Chapel and a communications officer named M'Ress, an ailuroid officer who served alongside Uhura.

Barrett returned years later in Star Trek: The Next Generation, cast as the outrageously self-assertive, iconoclastic Betazoid ambassador, Lwaxana Troi, who appeared as a recurring character in the series, often visiting her daughter Deanna, the ship's counselor. Her character often vexed the captain of the Enterprise, Jean-Luc Picard, who spurned her amorous advances. She later appeared as Ambassador Troi in several episodes of Star Trek: Deep Space Nine, where her character developed a strong relationship with Constable Odo.

She was the regular voice of the onboard computers of Federation starships for Star Trek: The Original Series, Star Trek: The Next Generation, Star Trek: Deep Space Nine, Star Trek: Voyager, and most of the Star Trek movies. She reprised her role as a shipboard computer's voice in two episodes of the prequel series Star Trek: Enterprise, thus making her the only actor to have a role in all six televised Star Trek series produced up to that time. She also lent her voice to various computer games and software related to the franchise. The association of her voice with interactions with computers led to Google's Assistant project being initially codenamed Google Majel. She made a point of attending a major Star Trek convention each year in an effort to inspire fans and keep the franchise alive.

On December 9, 2008, shortly before her death, Roddenberry Productions announced that she would be providing the voice of the ship's computer again, this time for the 2009 motion picture reboot of Star Trek.

=== Other roles ===
My mother truly acknowledged and appreciated the fact that Star Trek fans played a vital role in keeping the Roddenberry dream alive for the past 42 years. It was her love for the fans, and their love in return, that kept her going for so long after my father passed away.

— Eugene "Rod" Roddenberry, Jr.,

She appeared as Primus Dominic in Roddenberry's 1973 postapocalyptic TV drama pilot, Genesis II; as Dr. Bradley in his 1974 television film The Questor Tapes and as Lilith the housekeeper in his 1977 TV drama pilot, Spectre. She also appeared in Michael Crichton's 1973 sci-fi Western, Westworld as Miss Carrie, a robot brothel madam; the 1977 Stanley Kramer thriller The Domino Principle; and the 1979 television film The Man in the Santa Claus Suit starring Fred Astaire. Her later film appearances included small roles in Teresa's Tattoo (1994) and Mommy (1995).

After Gene Roddenberry's death, Barrett took material from his archives to bring two of his ideas into production. She was executive producer of Earth: Final Conflict (in which she also played the character Dr. Julianne Belman), and Andromeda. She also served as creative director for Gene Roddenberry's Lost Universe, a comic book series based on another archival Roddenberry concept.

In a gesture of goodwill between the creators of the Star Trek franchise and of Babylon 5, she appeared in the Babylon 5 episode "Point of No Return", as Lady Morella, the psychic widow of the Centauri emperor, a role which foreshadowed major plot elements in the series. Parodying her voice work as the computer for the Star Trek series, Barrett performed as a guest voice on Family Guy as the voice of Stewie Griffin's ship's computer in the episode "Emission Impossible".

Barrett's widely recognized voice performance as the Star Trek computer inspired the Amazon Alexa interactive virtual assistant, according to its developer Toni Reid, although Barrett had no direct role in it.

=== Final voiceover work ===
Some of Barrett's final voiceover work was still in post-production, to be released in 2009 after her death, as mentioned in the credits of the 2009 film Star Trek, again as the voice of the Enterprise computer. An animated production called Hamlet A.D.D. credited her as Majel Barrett Roddenberry, playing the voiceover role of Queen Robot.

== Personal life and death ==
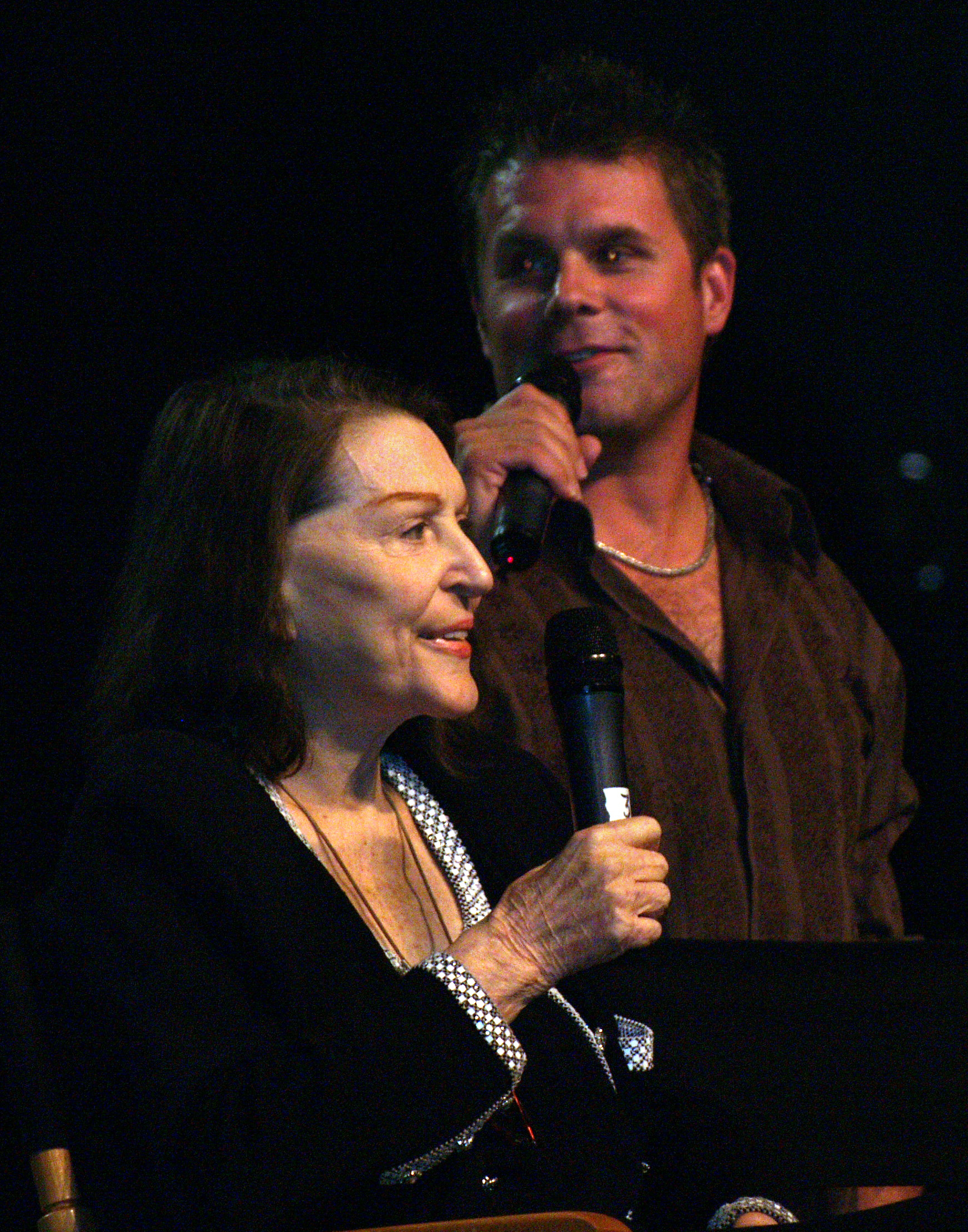
Barrett and son Rod in Las Vegas, August 2008

In 1969, while scouting locations in Japan for MGM, Roddenberry realized that he missed Barrett, and proposed to her by telephone. Herbert F. Solow said that Roddenberry traveled to Japan with the intention of marrying Barrett. Barrett joined Roddenberry in Tokyo, where they were married in a Shinto ceremony on August 6, 1969. Roddenberry considered it "sacrilegious" to have an American minister in Japan perform the ceremony. The wedding was attended by two Shinto priests as well as maids of honor. Roddenberry and Barrett both wore kimonos; on their honeymoon they toured Japan. Roddenberry continued to have liaisons with other women, telling his friends that while in Japan, he had an encounter with a masseuse about a week after he was married.

The new marriage was not legally binding, as Roddenberry's divorce from his first wife Eileen-Anita Rexroat had not yet been finalized. This was resolved two days after his divorce was complete, and on December 29, a small ceremony was held at their home, followed by a reception for family and friends. Despite that, the couple continued to celebrate August 6 as their wedding anniversary. Roddenberry's young daughter decided to live with him and Barrett and the family moved to a new house in Beverly Hills in October 1970. In February 1974, Barrett and Roddenberry had a son, Eugene Jr., known as Rod Roddenberry. They remained married until Gene's death at Barrett's side on October 24, 1991, in Santa Monica, California.

After her husband's death, Barrett-Roddenberry commissioned Celestis to launch her together with Gene on an infinite mission to deepest space. After putting them on the manifest for NASA's "Sunjammer" mission, the agency cancelled the mission in 2014. Celestis rescheduled a launch for 2020, then later rescheduled it for June 2022, the next available commercial mission to deep space. A sample of the couple's cremated remains would be sealed into a specially made capsule designed to withstand space travel. A spacecraft will carry the capsule along with digitized tributes from fans, on Celestis' "Enterprise Flight". The flight also would contain the ashes of Nichelle Nichols and Douglas Trumbull. The Celestis "Enterprise Flight" was successfully launched from Cape Canaveral, Florida on January 8, 2024.

Barrett-Roddenberry died on the morning of December 18, 2008, at her home in Bel Air, Los Angeles, California, as a result of leukemia. She was 76 years old. A public funeral was held on January 4, 2009, in Los Angeles. More than 250 people attended, including Nichelle Nichols, George Takei, Walter Koenig, Marina Sirtis, Brent Spiner, and Wil Wheaton.

== Honors ==
Barrett and her husband were honored in 2002 by the Space Foundation with the Douglas S. Morrow Public Outreach Award for their work creating awareness of and enthusiasm for space.

Amazon code-named the project which eventually became Alexa as "Majel".

== Filmography ==
=== Film ===
| Year | Title | Role | Notes |
|---|---|---|---|
| 1957 | Will Success Spoil Rock Hunter? | Shampoo demonstrator | Uncredited |
| 1958 | As Young as We Are | Joyce Goodwin | |
| 1958 | The Black Orchid | Luisa | Uncredited |
| 1958 | The Buccaneer | Townswoman #1 | |
| 1961 | Love in a Goldfish Bowl | Alice | |
| 1961 | Back Street | Woman at Table | Uncredited |
| 1963 | The Quick and the Dead | Teresa | |
| 1965 | Sylvia | Anne | Uncredited |
| 1966 | Made in Paris | Mrs. David Prentiss | Uncredited |
| 1967 | A Guide for the Married Man | Mrs. Fred V. | |
| 1967 | Track of Thunder | Georgia Clark | |
| 1968 | Here Come the Brides | Tessa | |
| 1973 | Westworld | Miss Carrie | |
| 1977 | The Domino Principle | Yuloff | |
| 1979 | Star Trek: The Motion Picture | Christine Chapel | |
| 1986 | Star Trek IV: The Voyage Home | Christine Chapel | |
| 1994 | Teresa's Tattoo | Henrietta | |
| 1994 | Star Trek Generations | Ship Computer | Voice role |
| 1995 | Mommy | Mrs. Withers | |
| 1996 | Star Trek: First Contact | Ship Computer | Voice role |
| 1998 | Star Trek: Insurrection | Ship Computer | Voice role |
| 2002 | Star Trek: Nemesis | Ship Computer | Voice role |
| 2009 | Star Trek | Ship Computer | Voice role; Posthumous release |
| 2014 | Hamlet A.D.D. | Queen Robot | Voice role; Posthumous release |

=== Television ===
| Year | Title | Role | Notes |
|---|---|---|---|
| 1959 | Whirlybirds | Nurse | Episode: "The Black Maria" |
| 1960 | Johnny Midnight | Rosemary McCoy | Episode: "The Villain of the Piece" |
| 1960 | Leave It To Beaver | Mrs. Rutherford | Episode: "Beaver and Violet" |
| 1961–1962 | Pete and Gladys | Dental Assistant | 2 episodes |
| 1962; 1966 | Bonanza | Belle Ganther; Annie Slocum | Episode: Gift of Water; Episode: Three Brides for Hoss |
| 1964 | The Lieutenant | Ruth Donaldson | Episode: "In the Highest Tradition" |
| 1965 | Star Trek "The Cage" | Number One | Original Star Trek-Pilot |
| 1966–1969 | Star Trek | Christine Chapel | 26 episodes |
| 1966–1969 | Star Trek | Ship Computer | Voice role; 7 episodes, uncredited |
| 1973 | Genesis II | Primus Dominique | Television film |
| 1973–1974 | Star Trek: The Animated Series | Christine Chapel (voice) | 9 episodes |
| 1973–1974 | Star Trek: The Animated Series | Various characters (voice) | 22 episodes |
| 1974 | Planet Earth | Yuloff | Television film |
| 1974 | The F.B.I. | Mrs. Derek | Episode: "The Animal" |
| 1974 | The Questor Tapes | Dr. Bradley | Television film |
| 1977 | Spectre | Mrs. Schnaible | Television film |
| 1979 | The Suicide's Wife | Clarissa Harmon | Television film |
| 1979 | The Man in the Santa Claus Suit | Miss Forsyth | Television film |
| 1987–1993 | Star Trek: The Next Generation | Lwaxana Troi | 6 episodes |
| 1987–1994 | Star Trek: The Next Generation | Ship Computer | Voice role; 101 episodes, uncredited in early seasons, later credited. |
| 1993–1999 | Star Trek: Deep Space Nine | Ship/Federation Computer | Voice role; 30 episodes |
| 1993–1999 | Star Trek: Deep Space Nine | Lwaxana Troi | 3 episodes |
| 1995–2001 | Star Trek: Voyager | Ship Computer | Voice role; 115 episodes |
| 1996 | Babylon 5 | Lady Morella | Episode: "Point of No Return" |
| 1996–1998 | Spider-Man: The Animated Series | Anna Watson (voice) | 17 episodes |
| 1997–1999 | Earth: Final Conflict | Dr. Julianne Belman | 11 episodes |
| 2001 | Family Guy | Ship Computer (voice) | Episode: "Emission Impossible" |
| 2005 | Star Trek: Enterprise | Ship Computer (voice) | Episodes: "In a Mirror, Darkly, Part II" & "These Are The Voyages" |
| 2023 | Star Trek: Picard | Enterprise Computer (voice) | Archival audio Episode: "Vox" & "Last Generation"; Posthumous release |
