= Planet Earth (film) =

1974 American science fiction film

- DVD release of the TV movie
- Genre: Sci-fi
- Screenplay by: Gene Roddenberry; Juanita Bartlett
- Directed by: Marc Daniels
- Starring: John Saxon; Diana Muldaur; Ted Cassidy; Janet Margolin; Christopher Cary; Corrine Camacho; Majel Barrett
- Music by: Harry Sukman
- Country of origin: United States
- Original language: English

Production
- Producer: Gene Roddenberry
- Cinematography: Archie R. Dalzell
- Running time: 74 minutes
- Production company: Warner Bros. Television

Original release
- Network: ABC
- Release: April 23, 1974

Planet Earth is a 1974 American made-for-television science fiction film that was created by Gene Roddenberry, written by Roddenberry and Juanita Bartlett (from a story by Roddenberry). It first aired on April 23, 1974, on the ABC network, and stars John Saxon as Dylan Hunt. It was presented as a pilot for what was hoped to be a new weekly television series. The pilot focused on gender relations from an early 1970s perspective. Dylan Hunt, confronted with a post-apocalyptic matriarchal society, muses, "Women's lib? Or women's lib gone mad..." The film also stars Diana Muldaur, Ted Cassidy, Janet Margolin, Christopher Cary, Corrine Camacho, and Majel Barrett. Marc Daniels directed the film.

== Plot ==
It is the year 2133, and Earth was devastated by a nuclear war decades earlier. PAX, a science-based society dedicated to restoring civilization and peace to the world, sends a team to conduct a survey of central California.

Returning to PAX headquarters, the team is attacked by a group of militaristic mutants known as the Kreeg. After a struggle, the PAX team manages to escape in a hyperloop-like subshuttle, a vehicle that can travel between settlements via tubes underground, built during the early 1990s before the final conflict of the 20th century. One of the team, Pater Kimbridge, is severely wounded. To save his life he requires a bioplastic prosthesis to repair the damaged pulmonary artery sheared away by a Kreeg rifle shot.

PAX Team 21, led by Dylan Hunt, with members Baylok, Isiah, and Harper-Smythe tries to locate a missing doctor, Jonathan Connor, the only surgeon who can perform the delicate surgery in time. Their search leads the team to the Confederacy of Ruth, a society of latter-day Amazons, where women are dominant and men are enslaved.

As a ruse, Harper-Smythe binds Hunt and enters the Confederacy's territory with him as her "property". Once there, she meets Marg, the leader of the women, who claims Dylan as her own property. Harper-Smythe makes her way to a nearby farm and meets a woman who explains how the society operates (and the fact that there are fewer and fewer children).

While captive, Hunt learns that the men (referred to as "Dinks") are subjugated by a drug in their food. Despite his efforts, he soon succumbs to the effects of the drug. Harper-Smythe arrives at the village in time to reclaim her "property" by challenging and defeating Marg. When Harper-Smythe is unable to find Connor in the village, Marg invites her to see Marg's newcomer Dinks. Connor comes forward with an antidote for the drug and Hunt recovers. Connor, Hunt and Harper-Smythe decide that she should swap Hunt for Connor, allowing the doctor to return to PAX. Marg agrees to the exchange and Connor and Harper-Smythe leave for PAX after first distributing the antidote in the Dink food supply. That evening, free of the influence of the drug, Hunt seduces Marg.

In the morning, a small party of Kreeg arrive and demand the secret to making men compliant. Hunt leads the un-drugged men in overpowering the invaders. They learn the men in the other households were equally successful in fending off the Kreeg. As a result, the women's council decides to suspend the drug treatment program on their males. Kimbridge soon recovers from the operation.

== Cast ==
- John Saxon as Dylan Hunt
- Janet Margolin as Harper-Smythe
- Ted Cassidy as Isiah
- Christopher Cary as Baylok
- Diana Muldaur as Marg
- Sally Kemp as Treece
- Johana De Winter as Villar
- Claire Brennen as Delba
- Corinne Camacho as Bronta
- Majel Barrett as Yuloff
- Jim Antonio as Jonathan Connor
- Aron Kincaid as Gorda
- John Quade as Kreeg Commandant
- Rai Tasco as Pater Kimbridge
- Sara Chattin as Thetis
- Lew Brown as Merlo
- Raymond Sutton as Kreeg Captain
- Joan Crosby as Kyla
- James Bacon as Partha
- Craig Hundley as Harpsichordist
- Robert McAndrew as First Dink
- Bob Golden as Second Dink
- Susan Page as Little Girl
- Patricia Smith as Skylar (Uncredited)

== Production ==
Planet Earth was the second attempt by Roddenberry to create a weekly series set on a post-apocalyptic future Earth. The previous pilot was Genesis II, and it featured many of the concepts and characters later redeveloped and mostly recast in Planet Earth. Planet Earth was intended to be a second pilot for Genesis II.

A third and final movie, Strange New World, was aired in 1975. However, Roddenberry was dismayed by the continuous changes that networks and studios were making and took his name off of the project after “Planet Earth” failed to result in a series. Strange New World also starred John Saxon as Captain Anthony Vico. In this movie a trio of astronauts returns to Earth after 180 years in suspended animation to locate the underground headquarters of PAX and free the people placed there in suspended animation.

None of these three pilots was ever developed into a series; however, some of the characters served as prototypes for the later TV series (based on Roddenberry's ideas), Andromeda. Most notably, the lead character of Andromeda was also named Dylan Hunt. Similarly, he is 'frozen in time', emerging into a chaotic post-apocalyptic universe were war destroyed the civilization of Hunt's time.

== Reception ==
=== Critical response ===
An example of what Time Magazine's movie critic Richard Corliss refers to as Hollywood's use of a blonde vs brunette polarity, dark haired Harper-Smythe fights her blonde nemesis, Marg, the Amazon leader.

Though this second treatment of the “Genesis II” concept also failed to produce the series Roddenberry had hoped for, some props from “Planet Earth” did get recycled in successive sci-fi series. The PAX Team21 uniform that John Saxon wore as Dylan Hunt was re-used in an episode of Fantastic Journey (1977), entitled “Riddles” (broadcast April 21, 1977).

In the years since the movie's release, many critics have focused on comparing the movie to other Roddenberry works, especially Star Trek. In a three-way comparison between the earlier Genesis II, Planet Earth and Star Trek, Saxon's character was considered closer to Star Trek’s Captain Kirk in that he shared the same "physical beauty" and "charming arrogance" as Kirk, compared to the dark, brooding star of Genesis II, played by Alex Cord. Saxon's fighting skills were also complimented by critics, "... you have to love Saxon delivering a full-on Captain Kirk drop-kick to a Kreeg." Janet Margolin has also been compared favorably to some of the female characters in Star Trek, including Yeoman Colt, featured in the first Star Trek episode "The Cage". Along with Muldaur, Margolin's fighting skills were also noted by critics as the sight of two barefoot women, one a fair, blue-eyed blonde and the other an olive skinned, dark-eyed brunette, fighting each other while wearing halter tops and slit skirts barely covering their bikini briefs, was difficult to ignore.

Marc Daniels brings professional polish and brisk pacing to the telefilm and the action sequences are very nicely-staged. Aside from the encounters with the Kreeg, there's a very well-done catfight between Muldaur and Margolin where it's clear that the two actresses are doing much of the stuntwork themselves."

Another fight scene, between the characters Harper-Smythe and Treece, was notable for taking place in front of Treece's children. The fight ends with the dark haired Harper-Smythe bringing her blonde opponent to her knees, unaware that the children are watching until they step forward, crying. Harper-Smythe, embarrassed, releases Treece and apologizes to the children for fighting their mother.

This mirrors a scene in Genesis II in which the shock wave from a nuclear explosion Hunt has triggered strikes a Pax lookout just as a mother has brought her young children out to see the stars. There and in the Planet Earth scene, the heroes witness the effect of their own violence on children, forcing them to rethink the use of force—a very effective and intelligent pacifistic touch from Roddenberry.

=== Release ===
Planet Earth aired April 23, 1974, on ABC. The film was released on DVD on November 16, 2009, by WBTV.

== See also ==
- List of American films of 1974
- Genesis II (1973)
- The Questor Tapes (1974)
- Strange New World (1975)
- Ark II (1976)
- Logan's Run (1976)
- Logan's Run (TV series) (1977–1978)
