= Spectre (1977 film) =

American-British television film directed by Clive Donner

- Title card
- Written by: Samuel A. Peeples; Gene Roddenberry
- Story by: Gene Roddenberry
- Directed by: Clive Donner
- Starring: Robert Culp; Gig Young; John Hurt
- Music by: John Cameron
- Countries of origin: United Kingdom; United States
- Original language: English

Production
- Executive producer: Gene Roddenberry
- Producer: Gordon L.T. Scott
- Cinematography: Arthur Ibbetson
- Editor: Peter Tanner
- Running time: 98 minutes
- Production companies: Norway Productions; 20th Century-Fox Film Corporation

Original release
- Network: NBC
- Release: 21 May 1977 (US)
- Release: 8 March 1980 (UK)

Spectre is a 1977 American-British made-for-television horror film produced by Gene Roddenberry. It was co-written by Roddenberry and Samuel A. Peeples, and directed by Clive Donner. It was one of several unsuccessful pilots created by Roddenberry, and one of several pilots in the 1970s in the occult detective subgenre. The pilot follows the adventures of William Sebastian (Robert Culp), a former criminologist and occult expert, and his colleague, Dr. Amos Hamilton (Gig Young), a physician and forensic pathologist, as they visit the United Kingdom to investigate a case involving the aristocratic Cyon family. The cast includes John Hurt, James Villiers, Gordon Jackson, Ann Bell, and Majel Barrett.

== Plot summary ==
William Sebastian is a former criminologist who now studies the occult to explain the problem of human evil. He has been cursed on one of his adventures by the demon Asmodeus, leaving him in constant need of medical attention. He summons an old colleague, Dr. Amos "Ham" Hamilton to his home to help him with a case involving the Cyon family. Dr. Hamilton does not believe in the occult and thinks that Sebastian and his housekeeper Lilith are playing tricks on him when he witnesses unusual events.

As the pair are getting reacquainted, a woman claiming to be Anitra Cyon unexpectedly visits and tells Sebastian that his services are no longer required. Sebastian recognizes that this person is not Anitra Cyon, but rather a succubus sent to stop Sebastian from investigating the family. He defeats her using the Apocryphal Book of Tobit. He and Ham depart to the airport where they are flown by Mitri Cyon to London. While over the Atlantic the engines of the plane fail, something that Sebastian claims is the result of supernatural intervention.

Thanks to Mitri's expertise, they land safely in England. Sebastian asks the Cyon chauffeur to stop off at the home of Dr. Qualus, a long-time associate who has been researching the Cyon family. Qualus' house is on fire. Ham and Sebastian find Qualus' body lying partially inside a pentagram, the body fatally mauled. The police arrive, and Inspector Cabell (an old acquaintance from their criminology days) escorts them to Cyon Manor. When they reach the Manor, they are greeted first by Sir Geoffrey Cyon, Anitra and Mitri's older brother and head of the family. He is aware that Sebastian and Ham are there to investigate him and wants his sister convinced that nothing is wrong. The real Anitra reiterates her reason for consulting Sebastian: due to an unknown influence, Geoffrey's behaviour has changed dramatically and he has turned Cyon Manor into a den of iniquity. Geoffrey dismisses her concerns. The following day Mitri is attacked by dogs and badly injured. Sebastian and Ham suspect Geoffrey is behind the attack. That night, the duo investigate the grounds of the Manor and discover ruins which lead to a hidden underground temple devoted to Asmodeus. They suspect that the real Geoffrey is dead and that Asmodeus has assumed his form.

The next day the pair prepare to do battle with Asmodeus and his cult. Further investigation of the hidden temple reveals that it is Mitri who is dead and whose form Asmodeus has assumed. Geoffrey is a pawn who was used to increase the cult and who will be forced to sacrifice Anitra to Asmodeus. Asmodeus removes the curse on Sebastian and invites him to join him, but Sebastian rejects the offer and battles Asmodeus. The temple and the Cyon house are destroyed but Sebastian, Hamilton and Anitra Cyon escape.

Back home, Sebastian receives a painting from Anitra Cyon similar to one he had admired. In the final moment of the film, Sebastian sees the symbol of Asmodeus (a stylised letter "A") in the painting. The conflict with Asmodeus is only beginning.

== Cast ==
- Robert Culp as William Sebastian
- Gig Young as Dr. Amos "Ham" Hamilton
- John Hurt as Mitri Cyon
- Gordon Jackson as Inspector Cabell
- Ann Bell as Anitra Cyon
- James Villiers as Sir Geoffrey Cyon
- Majel Barrett as Lilith
- Jenny Runacre as Sydna
- Angela Grant as Butler
- Penny Irving as First Maid
- Vicki Michelle as Second Maid
- Lindy Benson as Third Maid
- Sally Farmiloe as Fourth Maid
- Michael Latimer as Co-pilot

== Production ==
Spectre was intended as the pilot for a television series, but was rejected. The relationship between William Sebastian (Robert Culp) and Dr. Amos "Ham" Hamilton (Gig Young) is deliberately reminiscent of that of Sherlock Holmes and Dr. Watson, although there are also some aspects that recall the relationship between Gene Roddenberry's own Spock (Leonard Nimoy) and Leonard McCoy (DeForrest Kelly) from Star Trek. Roddenberry previously revisited this relationship in an earlier failed pilot, The Questor Tapes.

Spectre was one of a number of unsuccessful television pilots in the 1970s in the occult detective subgenre. After its rejection by American television, an extended version of Spectre was released in the UK as a theatrical film with additional footage that includes nudity. The version currently in television syndication is a heavily edited version of the UK theatrical release, which retains some of the less explicit nudity in the Black Mass finale.

John Cameron was selected as the composer for the film's musical score.

== Characters ==
=== William Sebastian ===
William Sebastian (Robert Culp) is a former criminologist who worked in partnership with Amos "Ham" Hamilton for eight years. He is a brilliant detective with incredible intuitive skills and a belief that there are things beyond science that are real. He came to believe that some unseen forces were causing a number of significant crimes, particularly after studying Charles Manson, Richard Speck, the Boston Strangler, and the Tokyo Bluebeard. After his split with Ham five years ago he immersed himself in the Occult, and has an extensive collection of occult artifacts. Recently Sebastian undertook an occult experiment which has damaged his heart.

=== Amos "Ham" Hamilton ===
Dr. Amos "Ham" Hamilton (Gig Young) is a medical doctor who worked as staff physician and forensic pathologist at Fairview General Hospital in Boston, Massachusetts, but thirteen years ago he started a partnership with William Sebastian as criminal investigators. He was the more down-to-earth member of the partnership and after eight years Ham became tired of working with Sebastian and returned to Fairview. Recently his alcoholism and womanizing has interfered with his work.

=== Lilith ===
Lilith (played by Gene Roddenberry's wife Majel Barrett) is Sebastian's housekeeper, a practicing witch who brews a remedy that "cures" Ham's alcoholism through aversion therapy.

== Novelization ==
A novelization of the movie was written by Robert Weverka, and published by Bantam Books in 1979. (ISBN 0-553-13302-0) Robert Weverka novelised a number of other television and movie productions. The Spectre novelisation is 154 pages long and adds significant background information not present in the script.
