= Strange New World (film) =

1975 television film by Robert Butler

- John Saxon as Captain Anthony Vico in Strange New World.
- Genre: Science fiction
- Written by: Ronald F. Graham; Alvin Ramrus; Walon Green
- Directed by: Robert Butler
- Music by: Robert E. Larson; Elliot Kaplan
- Country of origin: United States
- Original language: English

Production
- Producer: Robert E. Larson
- Cinematography: Michael Margulies
- Editors: David Newhouse, A.C.E.
- Running time: 100 minutes
- Production company: Warner Bros. Television

Original release
- Network: ABC
- Release: July 13, 1975

Strange New World is an American made-for-television science fiction film which first aired on July 13, 1975 on ABC. It stars John Saxon as Captain Anthony Vico (PAX team leader), Kathleen Miller as Dr. Allison Crowley (team navigator and communications expert), and Keene Curtis as Dr. William Scott (team physician/medical doctor). The title of the film was borrowed from the famous opening monologue of Roddenberry's Star Trek.

== Plot ==
Three astronauts return to Earth after being cryogenically frozen and looking to reestablish the organisation (PAX) that had sent them into space. The PAX team members describe the disaster which befell the Earth (a swarm of giant asteroids). PAX headquarters changed the orbit of their space station so that it would orbit the Sun and return to Earth in 180 years, during which time its crew and hundreds of volunteer personnel located below PAX headquarters, would remain in suspended animation. Upon returning to Earth, the astronauts' primary mission was to make their way back to PAX headquarters and revive their colleagues.

== Cast ==
- John Saxon as Capt. Anthony Vico
- Kathleen Miller as Dr. Allison Crowley
- Keene Curtis as Dr. William Scott
- James Olson as Surgeon
- Martine Beswick as Tana
- Reb Brown as Sprang
- Ford Rainey as Sirus
- Bill McKinney as Badger
- Gerrit Graham as Daniel
- Catherine Bach as Lara - the Guide
- Cynthia Wood as Arana
- Norland Benson as Hide
- Dick Farnsworth as Elder
- Lawrence Greenstein as Mutant (uncredited)

== See also ==
- List of American films of 1975
- Genesis II (1973)
- Planet Earth (1974)
- Andromeda (TV series)
- The Questor Tapes (1974)
- Ark II (1976)
- Logan's Run (1976)
- Logan's Run (TV series) (1977—1978)

== Background ==
The TV Movie was originally a TV pilot and the third attempt to create a series around a post-apocalyptic future created by Gene Roddenberry. The first two, Genesis II and Planet Earth (the latter also starring Saxon in the lead role), explored Earth after a nuclear war and focused on an organization called PAX that was working to bring peace and order to the world. Roddenberry was closely involved with the previous two incarnations, but less so with Strange New World, for which he is not credited. Character names, as well as some of the main points of the concept were changed to avoid any potential litigation.

Strange New World is considered by many observers to have been the weakest of the three productions which envisaged the world of PAX. Like the previous attempts, it was not developed into a weekly series.
