= The Questor Tapes =

American television film / pilot

- Title shot
- Genre: Adventure; Drama; Science Fiction
- Screenplay by: Gene Roddenberry; Gene L. Coon
- Story by: Gene Roddenberry
- Directed by: Richard Colla
- Starring: Robert Foxworth; Mike Farrell; John Vernon; Lew Ayres; James Shigeta; Robert Douglas
- Music by: Gil Mellé
- Country of origin: United States
- Original language: English

Production
- Executive producers: Jeffrey M. Hayes; Gene Roddenberry
- Producer: Howie Horwitz
- Production locations: California Institute of Technology - 1200 E. California Boulevard, Pasadena, California
- Cinematography: Michael D. Margulies
- Editors: Robert L. Kimble; J. Terry Williams
- Camera setup: Technicolor
- Running time: 92 minutes
- Production companies: Jeffrey Hayes Productions; Universal Television

Original release
- Network: NBC
- Release: January 23, 1974

The Questor Tapes is a 1974 American made-for-television sci-fi drama film about an android (portrayed by Robert Foxworth) with incomplete memory tapes who is searching for his creator and his purpose. Conceived by Gene Roddenberry, who is credited as executive consultant, the script is credited to Roddenberry and fellow Star Trek alumnus Gene L. Coon. The pilot was directed by Richard Colla.

A novelization, written by D. C. Fontana (another Star Trek alumna), was dedicated to Coon, who died before the program was broadcast.

== Plot ==
Project Questor is the creation of Nobel laureate Emil Vaslovik, Ph.D., a brilliant scientist who plans to build a superhuman android. After he disappears, an international team of experts constructs the android from Valovik's parts and blueprints. The experts don't fully understand the components and their attempts to decode the programming tape damages it. Geoffrey Darrow, the head of the project, orders the half-erased tape replaced with new programming, over the objections of Jerry Robinson, the only team member who had actually worked with Dr. Vaslovik. The new programming is installed in the completed android's body. When nothing happens, Robinson persuades Darrow to use Vaslovik's damaged tape, but it doesn't work either.

After the team departs, the android comes to life and adds various cosmetic touches to its previously featureless outer skin, taking on a male appearance. The android leaves the lab for Vaslovik's office and archives and identifies himself as "part of Project Questor". The android seeks out Robinson and forcibly brings him in a search for Vaslovik. Darrow sets off in pursuit of both.

Questor, acting more human as time passes and his programming evolves, knows he is programmed to seek an aquatic vehicle, and that a countdown timer will cause the nuclear generator in his abdomen to explode if he fails to find Vaslovik. Questor and Robinson travel to England, and the home of Lady Helena Trimble, who had known and worked with Vaslovik. Questor deciphers a number of clues in his programming and tells Robinson he knows where to find Vaslovik, but he is machine gunned by a British soldier in a park, forcing a return to the laboratory. The attack has accelerated the countdown to the explosion to about a day. Robinson partially repairs Questor, and Darrow gives him two options: put a homing transmitter inside the android, and they will be given a plane to find Vaslovik. If Robinson refuses, the android will be flown to a location where the explosion will not endanger anyone. Robinson implants the transmitter, and they jet off to Mount Ararat; the "boat" imperative, as Questor had realized just minutes before being shot, had referred to Noah's Ark.

Robinson and Questor reach a concealed cave on Mount Ararat with seconds to spare. Emil Vaslovik, is there, and tells Questor and Robinson that he is also an android. Questor is the last of a series, going back to "the dawn of this world," left there by "Masters" to serve and protect mankind according to the creed:

"We protect, but we do not interfere. Man must make his own way. We guide him — but always without his knowledge."

Each of the Masters' previous androids had a lifespan of several hundred years, at the end of which each assembled its replacement. The unexpected, rapid advent of nuclear physics and the radioactive fallout from above-ground nuclear testing had damaged Vaslovik. Vaslovik, correcting these failures with Questor's design, asks Robinson to help Questor learn about humanity and is able to die with peace of mind. Darrow has brought the military with him to destroy the android, believing humanity doesn't deserve Questor's help. Questor convinces him otherwise, and Darrow decides to sacrifice his own life for Questor's sake. He leaves with the transmitter, telling the military commander Vaslovik went insane and the android escaped. He takes off in the jet Questor and Robinson used and turns on the transmitter. Jet fighters destroy the Darrow's plane. Questor displays his first human-like emotion and the pair embark on their mission.

== Cast ==
- Robert Foxworth as Questor
- Mike Farrell as Jerry Robinson
- John Vernon as Geoffrey Darrow
- Lew Ayres as Dr. Emil Vaslovik
- James Shigeta as Dr. Chen
- Robert Douglas as Dr. Michaels
- Dana Wynter as Lady Helena Trimble
- Majel Barrett as Dr. Bradley
- Ellen Weston as Allison Sample
- Fred Sadoff as Dr. Audret
- Walter Koenig as Administrative Assistant

== Production ==
=== Development ===
The Questor Tapes was a pilot for a television series. A 13-episode go-ahead was given for the series before the television movie was aired, with both Foxworth and Farrell having signed to reprise their roles. Joining the actors behind the scenes were producers Michael Rhodes and Earl Booth and story editor Larry Alexander. The green-lighted series was slated for Friday nights at 10 p.m. on NBC — the "death slot" where the final season of the original Star Trek had withered.

Conflict between Roddenberry and both Universal and NBC over the content of the proposed series doomed it, most notably ignoring the revelation at the end of the TV movie and eliminating the key character of Jerry Robinson. These changes were too much for Roddenberry, who abandoned the project. No episodes were produced.

The Questor Tapes was one of a series of television movies in which Roddenberry was involved, which also included Genesis II, Planet Earth, Strange New World and Spectre. All were intended as pilots; none led to a series.

=== Casting ===
Originally Leonard Nimoy was asked to play Questor. He posed in makeup for production photos and agreed to do the weekly series if picked up. However, Roddenberry hired Robert Foxworth. Mike Farrell was cast as Jerry Robinson.

=== Music ===
The music for The Questor Tapes was scored by Gil Mellé, who was a jazz musician as well as a saxophonist, composer, and also noted as a painter. (Some of his music for The Questor Tapes was later repurposed as the theme music for the TV series Kolchak: The Night Stalker. Both properties were developed at, and produced out of, Universal Studios.) Mellé also was known for scoring My Sweet Charlie, That Certain Summer, and Frankenstein: The True Story. His most well-known film score was The Andromeda Strain, whose director, Robert Wise, later directed Star Trek: The Motion Picture.

== Reception ==
=== Release ===
The Questor Tapes aired on NBC on January 23, 1974. The telefilm was released, as a MOD (Manufacture-On-Demand) DVD on September 18, 2012, by Universal Pictures's Vault Series in Region 0. A Blu-Ray was released by Kino Lorber in December 2023.

=== Awards ===
In 1975, The Questor Tapes was nominated for a Hugo Award for Best Dramatic Presentation.

== Legacy ==
=== In Star Trek: The Next Generation ===
Gene Roddenberry's son, Rod, has confirmed that the Questor android was an inspiration for the character of Data, from Roddenberry's later Star Trek: The Next Generation. In a casino scene situated in a London nightclub, Questor successfully detects weighted ("loaded") dice, and their subsequent realignment in his precise, powerful hand was later duplicated by Data in the second season Star Trek: The Next Generation installment "The Royale".

Another Questor/Data inside joke came from a scene in which Questor discussed the human trait of "negotiating" through sexual activity, informing Robinson, "I am fully functional." While there is no such activity in The Questor Tapes, in "The Naked Now", an episode of The Next Generation Data also comments, to Tasha Yar, "I am fully functional."

=== Proposed remake ===
Herbert J. Wright, who had a long friendship with Roddenberry, had strong ties to the series that was never made. The two had met when Wright became aware of the movie, fell in love with the story, and wanted to be a part of the series. After some sample submissions, Wright was allowed to join, but he never had the chance, as the series was scrapped after Roddenberry's creative differences with the studio. Wright kept the idea alive, with hope of the series coming to fruition throughout the years.

When the rights finally came back to the Roddenberry family in the early 2000s, Wright secured the rights with the blessing of Roddenberry's family to produce the series. Wright made several promotions for the series in 2003 at conventions. Wright even reserved production locations while working on a first script. The show suffered what was at first a simple setback when Wright fell ill within a year, which delayed the show's development. Wright died in 2005 before he could finally bring the show to life.

In January 2010, Roddenberry Productions announced that it was working with Imagine Television on a pilot for a new version of The Questor Tapes. No further information was ever made available.

== See also ==
- List of American films of 1974
- Genesis II (1973)
- Planet Earth (1974)
- Strange New World (1975)
- Ark II (1976)
- Logan's Run (1976)
- Logan's Run (TV series) (1977—1978)
