= Alex Cord =

American actor (1933–2021)

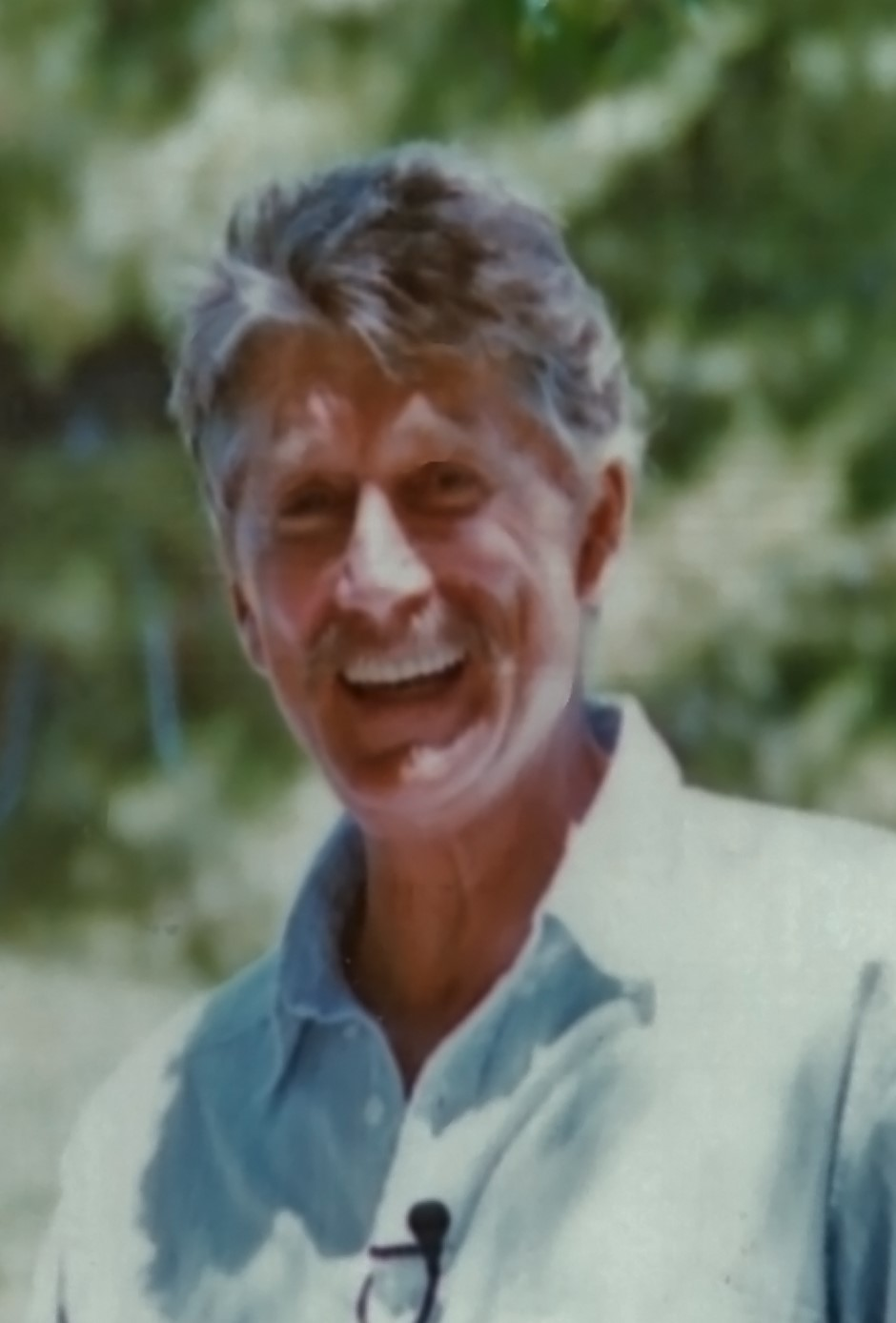
- Cord on the set of The Paddlefish: An American Treasure in 1993
- Born: Alexander Viespi Jr. May 3, 1933; Floral Park, New York, U.S.
- Died: August 9, 2021 (aged 88); Valley View, Texas, U.S.
- Education: New York University; American Shakespeare Theatre
- Occupation: Actor
- Years active: 1961–2009
- Spouses: Joanna Pettet (m. 1968; div. 1989) Susannah Moller (m. 2002; div. 2017)
- Children: 3
- Awards: 1966 Golden Laurel, nominee for New Faces; 2001 Golden Boot Award, winner

Alexander Viespi Jr. (May 3, 1933 – August 9, 2021), known professionally as Alex Cord, was an American actor. He was best known for his portrayal of Michael Coldsmith Briggs III, better known as Archangel, in 55 episodes of the American television series Airwolf (1984–1986). Early in his career, he was credited as Alex Viespi.

== Early life ==
Cord was born to an Italian family in Floral Park, New York, the son of Marie (Paladino) and Alexander Viespi, who was in the construction business. Cord was stricken with polio at the age of 12. His family then moved to Wyoming, where doctors advised him to take up horseback riding as a therapeutic exercise. This helped him recover from the disease by the time he was 16. Cord attended New York University in New York City and the American Shakespeare Theatre at Stratford, Connecticut.

== Career ==
In July 1960, Cord (billed under his real name) acted in a production of The Curious Savage in Canal Fulton, Ohio. He had a role in the 1961 episode "The Mountain Men" of the TV series Laramie. Cord's second role came a month later as Nino Sanchez in the episode "Winter Quarters" of Frontier Circus. In 1962, he appeared as Larry Rome in the episode "Take a Number" of the crime drama Cain's Hundred.

Cord appeared in the 1962 film The Chapman Report, directed by George Cukor. He briefly enjoyed a leading man status on the big and small screen during the 1960s and 1970s, and starred or co-starred in mostly crime dramas, action films, and westerns.

In 1963 and 1964, Cord was cast as different characters in five episodes of the series Route 66, including the role of Michael in the two-part "Where There's a Will, There's a Way." In 1964, he played the part of Sam in the episode "If Your Grandmother Had Wheels" of East Side/West Side. During this same period, he appeared twice on Naked City.

In 1965, Cord was cast as Jed Colbee in the episode "Survival" of Branded. In 1966, he played the Ringo Kid in a remake of Stagecoach, which arguably remains Cord's most heavily publicized endeavor, during which he was ballyhooed in the press as a former football player since the role was originally portrayed by minor college football player John Wayne (who had since starred in eighty Western movies, usually with his name above the title, throughout the 1930s) in John Ford's 1939 version. Cord co-starred in The Brotherhood with Kirk Douglas, about a Mafia figure being sent to murder his own brother.

He guest-starred on the Rod Serling anthology series Night Gallery where he met his co-star and wife Joanna Pettet while filming the episode "Keep in Touch - We'll Think of Something". In 1974, Cord twice guest-starred on the NBC series Born Free, and he appeared in the motion picture Chosen Survivors.

Cord is among a handful of actors to appear on both the original and revival versions of CBS's Mission: Impossible. Cord also is known to science fiction enthusiasts for having portrayed Dylan Hunt in the failed 1973 television pilot Genesis II, which was created by Gene Roddenberry. In 1977, he starred as the title character in the epic western Grayeagle.

In 1972, he appeared as Pete Brown in the episode "The Sodbusters" of Gunsmoke. In 1973, he played the role of Haynes in "The Night of the Long Knives" on The F.B.I.. From 1973 to 1976, he appeared in four episodes of Police Story. In 1979 and 1981, he appeared twice on The Love Boat. In 1984 Cord starred in Airwolf The Movie a two-hour pilot of the subsequent series. In 1988, Cord was cast in an episode of Simon & Simon; in 1988 and 1992, he appeared on Jake and the Fatman. He also appeared in a 1988 episode of the TV series War of the Worlds. He appeared twice in Murder, She Wrote. In 1995, Cord played the character Larry Curtis in the episode "The Guardians" of Walker, Texas Ranger.

== Personal life and death ==
Cord lived in Cooke County, Texas. Cord suggested that Robert Fuller, his friend from Laramie, also move to Texas to raise horses. (Cord raised horses also in an episode of the Chrysler Theatre tv series.) Fuller and his second wife Jennifer Savidge did relocate to Cooke County in 2004. Cord and Fuller often made appearances at western film festivals, highlighting their continuing mutual interest in "The Spirit of the Cowboy". Cord died at his home in Valley View, Texas on August 9, 2021, at the age of 88.

== Filmography ==
=== Film ===
| Year | Title | Role | Notes |
|---|---|---|---|
| 1962 | The Chapman Report | Bardelli | Uncredited |
| 1965 | Synanon | Zankie Albo | |
| 1966 | Stagecoach | "The Ringo Kid" | |
| 1968 | A Minute to Pray, a Second to Die | Clay McCord | |
| 1968 | The Brotherhood | Vince Ginetta | |
| 1969 | Stiletto | Count Cesare Cardinali | |
| 1970 | The Last Grenade | Kip Thompson | |
| 1971 | The Tell-Tale Heart | The Murderer | Short film |
| 1972 | The Dead Are Alive | Professor Jason Porter | |
| 1973 | Genesis II | Dylan Hunt | |
| 1974 | Chosen Survivors | Steven Mayes | |
| 1975 | Inn of the Damned | Cal Kincaid | |
| 1977 | Sidewinder 1 | Packard Gentry | |
| 1977 | Grayeagle | Grayeagle | |
| 1984 | Jungle Warriors | Nick Spilotro | |
| 1987 | Uninvited | Walter Graham | Direct-to-video |
| 1990 | Street Asylum | Captain Bill Quinton | |
| 1990 | A Girl to Kill For | Mike / Wino | |
| 1991 | Joey Takes a Cab | | |
| 1992 | Roots of Evil | Jake | |
| 1992 | The Naked Truth | Herskovitz | |
| 1993 | CIA Code Name: Alexa | Victor Mahler | |
| 1993 | To Be the Best | Jack Rodgers | Direct-to-video |
| 1995 | Hologram Man | Governor Hampton | Direct-to-video |
| 2001 | Air Rage | General Harlan Prescott | Direct-to-video |
| 2009 | Fire from Below | General Mark 'Stonewall' Jackson | |

=== Television ===
| Year | Title | Role | Notes |
|---|---|---|---|
| 1961 | Laramie | John Sanford | Episode: "The Mountain Men" |
| 1961 | Ben Casey | Frank Paulson | Episode: "Pavane for a Gentle Lady" |
| 1961 | Frontier Circus | Nino Sanchez | Episode: "Winter Quarters" |
| 1962 | Cain's Hundred | Larry Rome | Episode: "Take a Number: Jack Garsell" |
| 1962–1963 | Naked City | Dick Wilkes / Nicholas Kovar | 2 episodes |
| 1963 | Armstrong Circle Theatre | Juri Mishukov | Episode: "Invitation to Treason" |
| 1963 | Alcoa Premiere | Tomas Caliban | Episode: "The Hat of Sergeant Martin" |
| 1963 | The Nurses | Dr. Brian | Episode: "Circle of Choice" |
| 1963 | BBC Sunday-Night Play | Jerry Rogers | Episode: "The Joker" |
| 1963–1964 | Route 66 | Michael Tiffin / Rick Decatur / Jack / Raymond | 5 episodes |
| 1964 | ITV Play of the Week | Alvaro Mangiacavallo | Episode: "The Rose Tattoo" |
| 1964 | East Side/West Side | Sam | Episode: "If Your Grandmother Had Wheels" |
| 1965 | Branded | Jed Colbee | Episode: "Survival" |
| 1967 | Bob Hope Presents the Chrysler Theatre | Lucky Paxton | Episode: "The Lady Is My Wife" |
| 1967 | The Scorpio Letters | Joe Christopher | Television film |
| 1971 | Night Gallery | Erik Sutton | Segment: "Keep in Touch - We'll Think of Something" |
| 1972 | Gunsmoke | Pete Brown | Episode: "The Sodbusters" |
| 1972 | Mission: Impossible | Peter Cordel | Episode: "Crack-Up" |
| 1972 | Insight | Tom Slade | Episode: "The Killer" |
| 1973 | Genesis II | Dylan Hunt | Television film |
| 1973 | The F.B.I. | Haynes | Episode: "Night of the Long Knives" |
| 1973–1976 | Police Story | Officer Jackson Holt / William Allen / Bill Stryker - The Cowboy / Scully | 4 episodes |
| 1974 | Born Free | Paul Morgan - The Vet | Episode: "The Trespassers" |
| 1975 | Matt Helm | Gallagher | Episode: "Murder on Ice" |
| 1976 | Joe Forrester | | Episode: "Squeeze Play" |
| 1976 | The Quest | McWhorley | Episode: "The Buffalo Hunters" |
| 1976 | Police Woman | Bass | Episode: "Tennis Bum" |
| 1976 | The Six Million Dollar Man | Dave Harraway | Episode: "Task Force" |
| 1977 | Fire! | Dr. Alex Wilson | Television film |
| 1977 | Have I Got a Christmas for You | Dan Levine | Television film |
| 1978 | W.E.B. | Jack Kiley | 5 episodes |
| 1979 | Beggarman, Thief | Evans Kinsella | Television film |
| 1979–1981 | The Love Boat | Hank Welker / Mr. Barrett | 2 episodes |
| 1980–1984 | Fantasy Island | Paul Horner / Ra-Mas / Captain Juan Arguello / Kyle Mason / Robert West | 5 episodes |
| 1981 | Best of Friends | Bill | Television film |
| 1981 | Goliath Awaits | Dr. Sam Marlowe | Television film |
| 1982 | Cassie & Co. | Mike Holland | 13 episodes |
| 1984 | Airwolf | Michael Coldsmith Briggs III | Television film |
| 1984 | Hotel | Preston Dwyer | Episode: "Flesh and Blood" |
| 1984–1986 | Airwolf | Michael Coldsmith Briggs III / Archangel | 55 episodes |
| 1986 | Murder, She Wrote | Preston Bartholomew | 2 episodes |
| 1987 | The Law & Harry McGraw | Alec Harris | Episode: "The Fallen Arrow" |
| 1988 | The Dirty Dozen: The Fatal Mission | Dravko Demchuk | Television film |
| 1988 | Simon & Simon | Roland Vicente / Harry Lubash | Episode: "The Richer They Are the Harder They Fall" |
| 1988 | War of the Worlds | Marcus Madison Mason | Episode: "The Good Samaritan" |
| 1988 | Monsters | John Thunston | Episode: "Rouse Him Not" |
| 1989 | Freddy's Nightmares | The General | Episode: "Memory Overload" |
| 1989 | Mission: Impossible | Daniel Travers | Episode: "For Art's Sake" |
| 1989–1992 | Jake and the Fatman | Wade Kelleher / Wallace Cogan | 2 episodes |
| 1995 | High Sierra Search and Rescue | Marshal D.J. Stone | Episode: "Mozart & Stone" |
| 1995 | Kung Fu: The Legend Continues | Gary Bennett | Episode: "The Sacred Chalice of I-Ching" |
| 1995 | Biography | Additional voices | Episode: "Andrew Jackson: A Man for the People" |
| 1995 | Walker, Texas Ranger | Larry Curtis | Episode: "The Guardians" |
| 1996 | High Tide | | 2 episodes |
| 1996 | University Blues | | Television film |

== Awards ==
- Award of the London Critics Circle, nominee for Best Actor
- 1966 Golden Laurel, nominee for New Faces
- 2001 Golden Boot Award, winner

== Bibliography ==
- Alex Cord: Sandsong; Warner Books, 1976 (ASIN: B000R321IY)
- Alex Cord: A Feather in the Rain; Five Star Publications, 1995
