= Genesis II (film) =

1973 television film by John L. Moxey

- Genre: Sci-fi
- Written by: Gene Roddenberry
- Directed by: John Llewellyn Moxey
- Starring: Alex Cord; Mariette Hartley
- Music by: Harry Sukman
- Country of origin: United States
- Original language: English

Production
- Producer: Gene Roddenberry
- Cinematography: Gerald Perry Finnerman
- Editor: George Watters
- Running time: 74 minutes
- Production companies: Norway Productions; Warner Bros. Television

Original release
- Network: CBS
- Release: March 23, 1973

Genesis II is a 1973 American made-for-television science fiction film created and produced by Gene Roddenberry and directed by John Llewellyn Moxey. The film, which opens with the line "My name is Dylan Hunt. My story begins the day on which I died," is the story of a 20th-century man thrown forward in time, to a post-apocalyptic future, by an accident in suspended animation. The film stars Alex Cord, Mariette Hartley, Ted Cassidy, Percy Rodrigues, Harvey Jason, Titos Vandis, Bill Striglos, Lynne Marta, Harry Raybould and Majel Barrett.

== Plot summary ==
In 1979, NASA scientist Dylan Hunt is working on "Project Ganymede", a suspended animation system for astronauts on long-duration spaceflights. As chief of the project he volunteers for the first multi-day test. He places himself in chemically induced hibernation deep inside Carlsbad Caverns; while there, his laboratory is buried in an earthquake. The monitoring equipment is damaged and fails to wake him at the intended end of the test. He awakens instead in 2133, emerging into a chaotic post-apocalyptic world. An event called "the Great Conflict" — a third and final World War — destroyed the civilization of Hunt's time. Various new civilizations have emerged in a struggle for control of available resources. Those with the greatest military might and the will to use it have the greatest advantage.

Hunt is accidentally found and rescued by an organization calling themselves "PAX" (the Latin word for "peace"). PAX members are the descendants of the NASA personnel who worked and lived at the Carlsbad installation in Dylan's time. They are explorers and scientists who preserve what little information and technology survived from before the conflict, and who seek to learn and acquire more in an effort to build a new civilization. Members of PAX find Hunt still sealed in the hibernation chamber. They revive him and are thrilled to meet a survivor from before the conflict.

An elaborate "subshuttle" subterranean rapid transit system was constructed during the 1970s, due to the vulnerability of air transportation to attack. The subshuttles use a magnetic levitation rail system, and operate inside vactrain tunnels and travel at hundreds of miles per hour. The tunnel network is comprehensive enough to cover the entire globe. The PAX organization inherited the still-working system and uses it to dispatch their teams of troubleshooters.

A totalitarian regime known as the Tyranians rule the area once known as Arizona and New Mexico. The Tyranians are mutants who possess greater physical prowess than non-mutated humans; they can be identified by their dual navels. Their leader discovers that Hunt has knowledge of nuclear power systems, and they offer him great rewards if he can repair their failing nuclear power generator. However, once he is in their power, they attempt to force him to reactivate a nuclear missile system in their possession, with which they intend to destroy their enemies and dominate the region. Hunt is appalled by this small-scale replay of the events which must have led to the Great Conflict. He leads a revolt of the enslaved citizenry, sabotages the nuclear device, and destroys the reactor in a nuclear explosion. Destroyed as well is the entire Tyranian base complex.

To Hunt's dismay, the PAX leaders assert their pacifist nature and intentions. They are attempting to rebuild an idealistic society using all which was deemed "good" from Earth's past, and they regard Hunt's interference with a rival civilization and his destructive tactics as antithetical to this end. They also see great good in him and value his knowledge of the past. They ask Hunt to join PAX permanently, but only if he can agree never to take human lives again. Hunt half-heartedly agrees. Security chief Yuloff states that the rationale of taking lives to justify the saving of lives was what allowed the Great Conflict to happen in the first place.

== Cast ==
- Alex Cord as Dylan Hunt
- Mariette Hartley as Lyra-a
- Ted Cassidy as Isiah
- Percy Rodrigues as Primus Isaac Kimbridge
- Harvey Jason as Singh
- Titos Vandis as Yuloff
- Bill Striglos as Dr. Kellum
- Lynne Marta as Harper-Smythe
- Harry Raybould as Slan-n
- Majel Barrett as Primus Dominique
- Leon Askin as Overseer
- Liam Dunn as Janos
- Scott Graham as Tyranian Teacher
- Ed Ashley as Wehr-r
- Linda Grant as Astrid
- Robert Swan as Lahyn-n
- Beulah Quo as Primus Lu-Chan

== Production ==
=== Screenplay ===
While Roddenberry and Barrett were on vacation in the Bahamas in the summer of 1972, Roddenberry decided he missed working and wrote the screenplay in six weeks.

Genesis II was the first of three concepts that Roddenberry hoped to develop into a new television series following the success of Star Trek (the other two were The Questor Tapes and Spectre). Genesis II aired on CBS on March 23, 1973; although Roddenberry had stories lined up for a 20-episode first season, CBS declined to pick it up, opting instead for the short-lived Planet of the Apes live-action series.

The plot point about the Tyranians having a dual circulatory system with two hearts and thus identifiable because they were born with two navels was an elaborate in-joke. While producing Star Trek, Roddenberry was constantly besieged by demands for changes from the censors at NBC's Broadcast Standards department, which he took to calling the "BS Department" due to the often petty nature of their revisions. Among the things to which the censors routinely objected was the depiction of a navel on anyone with a bare midriff, resulting in several reshoots of scenes with actors in revealing but otherwise "decent" attire whose navels showed. By making the double navel the distinguishing physical feature of the Tyranians, Roddenberry was effectively filming every navel that he had been forced to censor from Star Trek twice over.

=== Episode concepts ===
The following are story concepts that were in development during the production of Genesis II that would have become individual episodes had the network approved the series.

- "Company B" — A "Trojan Horse" suicide squad from the days of the great conflict comes out of suspended animation and attacks PAX. They represent the 1995 A.D. ideal of a perfect soldier.
- "London Express" — A hair raising journey through submerged portions of the North Atlantic subshuttle tube to mysterious London of 2133 A.D. Dylan Hunt and Team-21 meet Lyra-A there and the mad monarch King Charles X.
- "Robots Return" — The advanced computers and sophisticated machinery found on a moon of Neptune by a 1992 NASA expedition have evolved into a new form of robot life and visit Earth in search of the "God" named NASA. They meet Hunt, formerly of NASA, and consider him a messiah. This story idea was later developed into the script for Star Trek: The Motion Picture, and shares that work's thematic similarities to the Star Trek episode "The Changeling", written by John Meredyth Lucas.
- "Poodle Shop" — Dylan Hunt is captured and put on sale by the females in a strange society where men are treated as domestic pets and often traded back and forth for breeding purposes. This story idea was previously seen in the Roddenberry's 1964 pitch document, “Star Trek Is...”, under the title “The Pet Shop” and would later turn into Genesis II's second pilot, Planet Earth. A similar storyline was later used in an episode (Episode 10 of Season 1 (1979–80)) of the science fiction television series Buck Rogers in the 25th Century.
- "The Apartment" — Trapped inside 20th century ruins by a mysterious force field, Hunt is catapulted through a time continuum back to 1975 where he can be seen as a "transparent ghost" by the girl living in the apartment there. A bizarre love affair with a surprise twist ending ensues. The basic plot appears later as an unused Star Trek: Phase II episode "Tomorrow and the Stars".
- "The Electric Company" — Dylan Hunt and his PAX team encounter a place where a strong priesthood holds a society in bondage through the clever use of electricity. The simple inhabitants see the flashes of light and the amplified voices as the sight and sound of "God", but Dylan's team ends the dominance of the priesthood when they come up with still better tricks. This episode superficially resembles the Star Trek episode "The Return of the Archons".

Source: - Lincoln Enterprises Catalog No. 6

== Planet Earth ==
Roddenberry reworked the material into a second pilot, Planet Earth, in which John Saxon replaced Cord in the role of Dylan Hunt. Based on network recommendations, this second pilot focused more on action and physical conflict than its predecessor. Though it aired on ABC in 1974, it was also declined. At this point, Roddenberry, faced with further proposed changes that he felt were too far flung from the original “Genesis II” concept, took his name off any further development and recused himself from any other adaptations. Warner Bros, which now owned the rights, reworked Roddenberry's material yet again for a third pilot, Strange New World, also starring Saxon, which aired on ABC in 1975. This third pilot was also declined.

== Andromeda ==
Robert Hewitt Wolfe used the name "Dylan Hunt" and many ideas from Roddenberry's Genesis II notes to create the Andromeda television series.

== Beyond the original film ==
In the early 2000s, an attempt was made to create a graphic novel sequel to Genesis II. The working title of the effort was called Genesis II: Alone Against Tomorrow. The concept was shared with the Roddenberrys and shopped to a few possible comic book publishers including Dark Horse Comics and Space Dog Entertainment, a division of Top Cow Comics. Five pages of the proposed artwork survived and is reprinted in Catching Lameds: Reflections on an Unconventional Life (Story Terrace Publications, 2022).

== Release ==
Genesis II aired on television on March 23, 1973. The film was released on DVD on November 11, 2009, by WBTV.

== See also ==
- List of American films of 1973
- Planet Earth (1974)
- The Questor Tapes (1974)
- Strange New World (1975)
- Ark II (1976)
- Logan's Run (1976)
- Logan's Run (TV series) (1977–1978)

== Bibliography ==
- Connelly, Sherilyn (2019). The First Star Trek Movie: Bringing the Franchise to the Big Screen, 1969-1980. New York City: McFarland & Company. p. 37. ISBN 978-1476672519.
- Ingram, Billy (1998). TV Party. Television's Untold Tales!. Lanham, Maryland: Taylor Trade Publishing. p. 214. ISBN 978-1566251846.
- Rickles, Ted and Eric Sheridan Wyatt (2022). Catching Lameds: Reflections on an Unconventional Life. Berkeley, CA. pp. 226–237. ISBN 979-8371721174
- Terrace, Vincent (2019). Encyclopedia of Television Pilots: 2,470 Films Broadcast 1937-2019 (2nd ed.). New York City: McFarland & Company. p. 86. ISBN 978-1476678740.
