= Lisa Ryder =

Canadian actress (born 1970)

- Born: 26 October 1970 (age 56); Edmonton, Alberta, Canada
- Education: University of Toronto
- Occupation: Actress
- Years active: 1994–present
- Spouse: Ari Cohen (m. 2005, divorced)
- Children: 2

Lisa Ryder (born 26 October 1970) is a Canadian actress, who portrayed the role of Beka Valentine on the science fiction television series Andromeda.

== Life and career ==
Ryder was born in Edmonton, Alberta, and attended the University of Toronto, where she began acting. She formed a local theatre group, Bald Ego Productions, in Toronto after graduation and landed her first film and television roles in the mid-1990s. She starred in many theatre productions, including "Put Me Away," a one-woman show which she wrote. She gained a following as Detective Tracy Vetter on the final season of the vampire drama Forever Knight in 1995–1996 and was cast on the syndicated science-fiction series Andromeda in 2000; the series ended in 2005 after 110 episodes. In 2001, she was nominated for a Gemini Award for Best Performance by an Actress in a Featured Supporting Role in a Dramatic Series. She also co-starred, as android Kay-Em 14, in the 2001 film Jason X.

Ryder guest-starred in Gene Roddenberry's Earth: Final Conflict, Total Recall 2070, Kung Fu: The Legend Continues, Wind at My Back and Psi Factor: Chronicles of the Paranormal. She also had a recurring role on The Newsroom. Her other movie roles include the critically acclaimed Canadian indie film Stolen Heart, the thriller Blackheart and the short films Strands and Lemon. She also wrote, produced, and starred in the film SF Seeks, featuring Michael Shanks, Gordon Michael Woolvett, Keith Hamilton Cobb and Lexa Doig. She appeared in a television advertisement for Cheer laundry detergent in the late 80s – early 90s.

In 2014, Ryder starred in the Canadian Stage co-production of Helen Lawrence. In 2019, Ryder's play A Blow in the Face premiered with Nightwood Theatre and Bald Ego Theatre in Toronto, Ontario. The play was inspired by her personal experiences with postpartum depression after the birth of her first child. In the premiere, Ryder played the roofer Cloudy.

== Filmography ==
=== Film ===
Year	Title	Role	Notes
1997	City of Dark	Kim	
1997	Strands	Halley	Short
1998	Blackheart	Sam	
1998	Stolen Heart	Joey	
2001	Jason X	Kay-Em 14	
2002	SF Seeks	Writer, producer, and star	Short
2004	Lemon	Estelle Freisen	Short
2012	The Story of Luke	Sara	
2013	Crystal Lake Memories: The Complete History of Friday the 13th	Herself	Documentary film
2016	Every Escape Imaginable	Wanda	Short
2019	Hotel Limbo	Nurse	

=== Television ===
Year	Title	Role	Notes
1994	Kung Fu: The Legend Continues	Alana	Episode: "Magic Trick"
1995-96	Forever Knight	Detective Tracy Vetter	Main role (Season 3)
1996	The Newsroom	Kris	Recurring role
1997	Earth: Final Conflict	Kate Boone	2 episodes
1997	Psi Factor	Mary Callwood	Episode: "Devolution"
1998	The Adventures of Shirley Holmes	Jenny Bain	Episode: "The Case of the Real Fake"
1999	Total Recall 2070	Dr. Grace	Episode: "Brightness Falls"
2000-05	Andromeda	Beka Valentine	Supporting role (110 episodes)
2001	Wind at My Back	Jane Easterbrook	2 episodes
2005	Secret Lives	Shelby	Television film
2009	His Name Was Jason: 30 Years of Friday the 13th	Herself	Documentary film
2011	Good Dog	Linda	2 episodes
2012	Secrets of Eden	Ginny McBradden	Television film
2012	Heartland	Kendra	Episode: "Crossed Signals"
2012	Alphas	Fiona	Episode: "God's Eye"
2013	Cracked	Lena Olsson	Episode: "Cherry Blossoms"
2013	The Good Witch's Destiny	Alicia Quinn	Television film
2014	Remedy	Wendy Goldman	3 episodes
2015	Killjoys	Keera Dean	Episode: "The Harvest"
2016	Bruno & Boots: Go Jump in the Pool	Peggy	Television film
2017	The Strain	Nurse Greenwood	Episode "4.2"
2017	Mary Kills People	Yvonne	Episode: "The River Styx"
2020	Endlings	Tresa Hewes	Recurring role
2022-26	From	Abby Stevens	Recurring role
2025	Gen V	Janet Riordan	Episode: "The Kids Are Not All Right"

=== Video games ===
Year	Title	Role
2015	Assassin's Creed: Unity - Dead Kings	Madame Margot (voice)
