= List of Andromeda characters =

This is a list of characters from the TV series Andromeda.

== Main characters ==
=== Dylan Hunt ===
Dylan Hunt
- First appearance: Season 1
- Last appearance: Season 5
- Portrayed by: Kevin Sorbo

In-universe information
- Species: Human/Paradine
- Gender: Male
- Affiliation: Systems Commonwealth; High Guard; Argosy Special Operations; Andromeda Ascendant

Dylan Hunt, portrayed by Kevin Sorbo, is a member of the All-Systems Commonwealth High Guard. Dylan was born in Visharna-Tarn, a city on the Commonwealth's capital planet, Tarn-Vedra, to a Paradine (a fact unknown to Dylan until the finale of season 4) father employed as a highly paid gardener at the Imperial Gardens and a mother employed as a genetically enhanced high-Gravity World Shuttle pilot. The name Dylan Hunt was previously used for the main protagonist played by Alex Cord in the Gene Roddenberry 1973 television film Genesis II (1973).

Dylan is human, half genetically enhanced because his mother was a Heavy-Worlder, descended from a race of superhumans genetically engineered to live on the harsh and hostile environments of high-gravity alien planets. Because of this, he is much stronger and faster than the average human (he was able to hold his own in hand to hand combat against a Nietzschean warrior, indicating that he has about five times normal human strength, speed and endurance, and most likely superhuman reflexes as well).

Dylan served two years enlisted. He then attended the High Guard Academy and graduated with honors. He served in Argosy Special Ops and commanded or served on the Crimson Eclipse.

Immediately prior to his command on the Andromeda Ascendant, he was given a secret mission to extradite the dictator Ferrin from the planet Mobius so he could stand trial on Tarn-Vedra for war crimes. When he confronted Ferrin, he was shot in the side and Ferrin was killed. The mission was still seen as a success by the High Guard, and Dylan was given command of the Starship Andromeda and his partner on the mission, Nietzschean warrior Gaheris Rhade, was made his First Officer.

He dated Sara Riley for several years and they were going to get married until Dylan was presumed dead or lost at the Battle of Hephaistos.

At the Battle of Hephaistos, Dylan was betrayed by his first officer and best man, Gaheris Rhade. The men and women of his crew abandoned ship and he killed Gaheris in self-defence. The starship Andromeda was pulled near a black hole and experienced severe time dilation. While only seconds passed for Dylan and the Andromeda, 303 years passed for the rest of the universe. Meanwhile, the avatar of the black hole freed Dylan, or at least his Paradine part, from the time dilation and they pursued a relationship, but when Beka Valentine uses the Eureka Maru to pull the Andromeda from the black hole, the Paradine half of Dylan "re-merged" with his human half. Though the Black Hole's Avatar Marida tries to convince him to stay, she fails.

When Dylan learns that his rescue by the Eureka Maru was only the attempt to salvage the Andromeda, he convinces the crew of the Maru to join him and help him restore the now fallen Systems Commonwealth. Although they lacked the military training and efficiency of his old crew, because they were so few in number, he was able to get to know them personally to an extent that he could not get to know his previous, far larger crews; that, added to the emotional vulnerability he felt at being stranded 300 years in his own future, the knowledge that the civilization he had lived in all his life had collapsed (and he, a military officer pledged to defend it, had failed to save it) and the pain of being betrayed by his first officer and closest friend, meant that Dylan bonded with them to a far greater extent than he had ever done in the Commonwealth, resulting in them becoming more like a family to him than a simple crew. Over the course of their mission, he came to see Beka Valentine as his closest friend, and formed equally close bonds with Seamus Harper and Trance Gemini, although his relationship with Tyr Anasazi was generally strained; although they could depend on each other in a fight, Dylan knew that, in the end, he could only "trust Tyr to be Tyr", requiring him to take care that any situations where Tyr might betray him would produce a better result if Tyr helped Andromeda.

After two years, Dylan was able to form a small Restored Systems Commonwealth, with about 50 member worlds.

Dylan did not know that his father was a Paradine (a human-like offshoot of the infamous Vedrans) until the finale of season 4. He also learns that this means that he has space-time manipulation powers, although it takes him a while to learn how to use them.

=== Beka Valentine ===
Beka Valentine
- First appearance: Season 1
- Last appearance: Season 5
- Portrayed by: Lisa Ryder

In-universe information
- Species: Human
- Gender: Female
- Affiliation: New Systems Commonwealth; Andromeda Ascendant; Eureka Maru; Female Progenitor of all Nietzscheans

Rebecca "Beka" B. Valentine, played by Lisa Ryder, is human but has never lived on a planet, having been (most likely) born on the salvage ship Eureka Maru which had been built by her drug-addict, cargo-running father, Ignatius Valentine and his friend and business partner, Sid Barry. Beka's semi-rich mother Senator Talia Waterkurk, left the Maru crew when she was seven, her "Uncle" Sid also left when she was a child when he and Ignatius had a fight (sparked by the murder of multiple customs officials by Sid). Beka's older brother Raphael Valentine left the Maru some time before Ignatius' death in CY 10097. Some time after inheriting the Maru, Captain Beka Valentine meets Bobby Jensen. They date for a while and Bobby becomes Beka's only crew member, until he lies to her about the nature of the cargo they picked up on Earth with the help of Seamus Harper. (Bobby said they were transporting computers when they were actually stealing missiles). Beka breaks up with Bobby and hires Harper, later hiring Rev Bem, Vexpag (who later dies in an accident, traumatizing Beka) and Trance Gemini. In CY 10087 the Maru pulls the Andromeda Ascendant out of the Hephaistos black hole while under contract with Gerentex. The crew join Dylan Hunt to restore the Systems Commonwealth and Beka becomes Andromeda's First Officer and pilot. At first Beka is skeptical about Dylan's quest, taking advantage of the free food and housing provided by Andromeda. But after a couple years Beka finds herself believing in the dream of a Restored Systems Commonwealth.

Beka is very loyal and protective of her crew; she would sooner die than let them down. When things go wrong Beka would consider leaving the Andromeda (and the danger) behind, especially when her friends had died. After being on Andromeda for five years, Beka's ability to cope with risk-taking improves and she becomes less inclined to shirk her responsibilities. Although she does not tolerate being lied to, Beka often deals in secrecy, whether it is looking for the big score or looking for the Engine of Creation. Beka spent her entire life on the Eureka Maru, and although her friends and family have come and gone, Beka and the Maru were never separated for long amounts of time.

Beka's strength and reflexes have been altered to make her reaction time faster, contributing to her already-superb spaceship piloting skills. These alterations were passed down from her father, who was himself genetically altered. (she did not actually have the alterations done to her DNA). She is also able to change her hair color due to nanobots her father gave her as a child (because having only one colour of hair was boring).

The nanobots that control her hair colour also have the ability to store information (as evidence when it turned out that her father had implanted a video of "Uncle" Sid murdering people at an air locker to avoid being arrested for drug trafficking).

When Beka reunites with her 'Uncle' Sid in episode 1x11 he doses her with a potent recreational drug called Flash in order to get information from her. Flash is dripped into the user's eyes and makes them temporarily smarter, faster, stronger and better than they usually are, however the feeling of invincibility leads to impaired judgment and erratic, sometimes violent behaviour. Although the dose Beka received was not enough to get her addicted, like her father, Beka enjoyed the experience and retakes Flash in episode 1x21 while attempting to reach Dylan's long lost homeworld, Tarn Vedra, in the hope of using the drug to enhance her abilities and follow the slipstream map she had recently retrieved back to Tarn Vedra. She overuses it and overdoses, nearly dying in the process and failing to reach her destination; from then on she has to deal with the lingering need for Flash.

When Beka was trapped in an alternate dimension with Tyr Anasazi in episode 4x07, the Abyss possessed her to spy on Dylan. Later the crew managed to extract the Abyss from her in episode 4x16, Dylan risking his life to draw the Abyss into an artificially created "duplicate" of Beka's subconscious mind.

While in Seefra, she seems to lose the loyalty she has for Dylan, saying when she helps him out that it will only be if it is for her benefit. She does help, but seems reluctant to unless she gets something out of it, although her old loyalty starts to return after the arrival of the Stranger from the future.

In the episode Pride Before the Fall (episode 5x12), Beka Valentine had romantic relations with a mysterious, charismatic young man named Peter (who was Dr. Paul Museveni, who is actually revealed to be Drago Musevini, Progenitor of all Nietzscheans, in clever disguise, though he later revealed his true identity). Peter (Musevini) took samples of Beka Valentine's DNA while she slept, then disappeared through the Route of Ages. By a strange circumstance of time travel, Beka became the Founding Matriarch of the entire Nietzschean Race.

Since the men and women of all Nietzschean Prides grow up in reverence of legendary Nietzschean Progenitor Drago Musevini, they would (if they knew) revere Beka Valentine as the Alpha Mother of the entire Nietzschean race. Beka tries to use this during the Battle of Tarazed to get to Andromeda safely, but the Nietzscheans do not stop their attack on her, likely because they did not believe her.

During the final confrontation with the Spirit of the Abyss, which Beka had a grudge against due to its possession of her, Beka's piloting skills prove to be crucial as she pilots Andromeda, dragging the Vedran Sun behind it, into and through the Abyss. Beka panics, believing she cannot do it, but Dylan gives her the confidence she needs and she succeeds, despite the immense gravity forces the Sun and the Abyss were inflicting on the ship. Before the final battle, Dylan and Beka exchanged a promise that they would always fly together.

=== Tyr Anasazi ===
Tyr Anasazi
- First appearance: Season 1
- Last appearance: Season 4
- Portrayed by: Keith Hamilton Cobb

In-universe information
- Species: Nietzschean
- Gender: Male
- Affiliation: Andromeda Ascendant; New Systems Commonwealth

Tyr Anasazi (full name: Tyr Anasazi of Kodiak Pride, out of Victoria by Barbarossa), played by actor Keith Hamilton Cobb, is a Nietzschean. The name Tyr Anasazi is composed of the name of the Norse god of combat, Tyr, and the term for a Pre-Columbian Native American culture, the Anasazi.

He is the last known surviving member of the once-powerful Kodiak Pride of the Nietzscheans. The Kodiak Pride was betrayed by the Drago-Kazov Clan, the ruling Nietzschean Pride, who once entrusted them with the sacred remains of Nietzschean Progenitor Drago Musevini during the war against the Systems Commonwealth.

Tyr Anasazi was captured and sold by alien slavers at a relatively young age to work in diamond mines. One day the mines caved in and he was buried approximately 200 metres underground, but he escaped, partly due to his indomitable will and his genetically derived superior strength and endurance. He became a highly paid and talented mercenary and was secretly hired by a wealthy and powerful Nightsider, Gerentex to secure the presumed lost High Guard warship Andromeda Ascendant with the crew of the Eureka Maru.

Following this incident, he joined Captain Dylan Hunt in his quest for a restored Commonwealth alongside the Maru's crew: Beka Valentine, Seamus Harper, Trance Gemini and Rev Bem.

Although Tyr's aggressive attitude and combative nature occasionally put him at odds with Dylan's more pacifistic approach, the two strong men developed a certain respect for each other. Tyr once commented that, in his opinion, if the universe collapsed, Dylan would be one of the only three survivors (the other two being Tyr himself and the cockroaches). Although Dylan knew that he could only "trust Tyr to be Tyr", he also knew how to ensure that what was best for Tyr Anasazi would also be best for the Andromeda.

However, over time Tyr Anasazi did occasionally display some surprisingly self-sacrificing behavior for a Nietzschean, such as when he risked death by hypothermia when trapped on the sinking Eureka Maru with Rev Bem and Seamus Harper so that the comatose Harper could use the only available EVA suit (They intended to flood the sinking ship with water and release it to propel them upwards, with Rev's Magog physiology leaving him better equipped to cope with the temperature).

In season one Tyr married Freya, First Daughter of the powerful Nietzscheans of Orca Pride, and she gave birth to their son, Tamerlane Anasazi, around a year later. Tyr Anasazi was separated from her shortly after the consummation of his arranged marriage and they met again more than a year later. His young son, Tamerlane Anasazi was revealed to be the genetic reincarnation of the legendary Nietzschean Progenitor, Drago Museveni, prophesied to be the Nietzschean Messiah, a great leader who would one day unite the various Nietzschean Prides and lead them to total domination over all the sentient species of the galaxies. This attracted the attention of the Genites, a group of fanatical genetic purists who sought to destroy genetically enhanced superhumans, especially the men and women of the Nietzschean Prides. Freya of Orca Pride died in the conflict with the Genites which brought their armies into Nietzschean territory and virtually wiped out the rest of Orca Pride. Their son Tamerlane Anasazi was sent away secretly for his own safety, with Tyr telling Dylan and the rest of the crew that his son was dead.

In the season three episode "And Your Heart Will Fly Away", Tyr Anasazi's former lover, a headstrong and fiery Nietzschean woman whom they rescue, named Desiree D'lene, is revealed to be Medea Zimri, out of Isabella by Zarathustra, also of the once-powerful but now fallen Kodiak Pride, though this fact they both state their intention to conceal, when they part at the end of the episode.

In the beginning of season 4, he uses his son Tamerlane Anasazi's DNA to trick all the other Nietzschean Prides into thinking he is the genetic reincarnation of legendary Nietzschean Progenitor Drago Museveni. He secretly unites the Drago-Kazov, the Sabra-Jaguar and the Maroon Prides, the three most powerful Nietzschean Prides, becomes their supreme leader and leaves Andromeda because his people were working with the Spirit of the Abyss. He then looked for the Star Map to the Route of Ages in order to weaken the Abyss and find a way to destroy the terrifying race of the Magog, which threatened all the sentient inhabitants of the Known Worlds with extinction. He ultimately ended up in an alternate universe where thought becomes reality with Andromeda crew-member Beka Valentine.

He bargains with the Spirit of the Abyss: if he is set free, they can use Beka Valentine as a spy on Andromeda's captain Dylan Hunt. Once the Spirit of the Abyss sealed its influence inside Beka, Dylan, new Nietzschean officer Telemachus Rhade and engineer Seamus Harper arrive and attempt to capture him. As he tries to escape, they shoot him in the back and injure him. Defiant to the end, Tyr Anasazi refused to surrender. He fell into the abyss, a canyon with endless darkness, and was never seen again.

=== Seamus Zelazny Harper ===
Seamus Zelazny Harper
- First appearance: Season 1
- Last appearance: Season 5
- Portrayed by: Gordon Michael Woolvett

In-universe information
- Species: Human
- Gender: Male
- Affiliation: New Systems Commonwealth; Andromeda Ascendant; Eureka Maru

Seamus Zelazny Harper, played by Canadian actor Gordon Michael Woolvett, is a member of the Andromeda Ascendant crew and is the engineer and fix-it man. Harper is the only member of the Andromeda's crew born and raised on post-Commonwealth Earth, specifically in Boston. After the Fall, it was conquered by the wealthy and powerful, ruling Nietzschean Pride called the Drago-Kazov, who treated unengineered humans poorly, and its inhabitants were frequently attacked by the Magog. The human denizens of Earth lived in poverty and conflict, which prompted Harper to run away. He was hired by Bobby Jensen for a one-time-gig, which placed him on the Eureka Maru, a salvage ship captained by Beka Valentine. After learning that Bobby had lied to her, Beka broke up with Bobby and hired Harper as the new engineer of the Maru. Harper joined the Andromeda crew in 303 AFC (After the Fall of the Commonwealth) (also CY 10087) along with Beka and the rest of the Maru crew: Trance Gemini and Rev Bem.

Harper's tumultuous upbringing has left him with somewhat deficient social skills, as well as a poor immune system—significantly he is the only non-genetically-enhanced human in the entire crew, with Dylan's mother being from a high-gravity world and Beka's reflexes having been enhanced by her father—and he prefers to spend his time in the company of machines, constantly fixing and upgrading Andromeda and her various systems. He is quirky, sarcastic, funny, a bit ego-centric, but undoubtedly a genius. He also constructed the humanoid avatar for the Andromeda AI, called Rommie by the crew. Harper has a neural interface (also called a Cerebral Port, or Data Port) at the base of his skull, which he uses to jack into computers, sentient ships, and programs.

Harper's middle name, "Zelazny", was probably given to the character by the writers as a tribute to the late, beloved science-fiction and fantasy author, Roger Zelazny. On a side note, "żelazny" means "made of iron" in some Slavic languages such as in Polish.

Harper once introduced himself as "Lieutenant Seamus Harper". While it is not unlikely that after the recreation of the Commonwealth the civilian command crew of the Andromeda would be officially enrolled into the High Guard and given ranks, and the rank insignia he was wearing on his clothes at the time would seem to support this, since Harper was at the time speaking to two attractive women and has never used the rank again in conversation, it is possible he was lying or exaggerating.

=== Trance Gemini ===
Trance Gemini
- First appearance: Season 1
- Last appearance: Season 5
- Portrayed by: Laura Bertram

In-universe information
- Species: Lambent Kith Nebula of sentient suns (Avatar of the sun Vedra)
- Gender: Female
- Affiliation: Tarn Vedra; New Systems Commonwealth; Andromeda Ascendant; Eureka Maru; Seefra

Trance Gemini was played by Canadian actress Laura Bertram. Her first appearance on the show is as a young, purple-skinned alien of unknown origin with a prehensile tail, somewhat resembling Marvel Comics' X-Man, Nightcrawler. She represents the archetype of the animal-like, sweet, sensitive, and silly fantasy creature and serves as both comic relief and moral support. Her behavior overall is innocent and childlike or naive, though ultimately serious (direly so at times), and clever. For example, her report on Dylan Hunt's rescue was "I looked for you. I found out where you were. I traveled to where you were. I got you out." (from Season 1 episode 15 "Forced Perspective"). The report is childlike, yet intentionally covert, neatly expressing the character's way of thinking.

Trance Gemini was the last member to join the crew of Beka Valentine's salvage ship Eureka Maru before they rescued the Andromeda Ascendant and its captain, Dylan Hunt, from the event horizon of a black hole. On the Andromeda, Trance serves as Environmentals and Life Support officer, xenobiologist, botanist and physician. Her work is mainly in the ship's hydroponics garden or medical deck, though she serves as member of the bridge crew as well.

Trance is mysterious about her true nature. Her accurate though untrained precognitive abilities save the crew of the Andromeda on many occasions. This ability also helps her in gambling, espionage and thievery when necessary.

In season two, Trance undergoes a transformation. Effects from a Tesseract machine, which folds spacetime and causes distorted overlaps between past and future, enables her to switch places with her future self. The "new" Trance is also played by Laura Bertram, but is now an accomplished warrior with a more seasoned and hardened personality, and golden skintone.

In season four's "The World Turns All Around Her", Dylan (only) learns that Trance Gemini is the living avatar of a sun. It is later revealed to all that she is the original Vedran Sun, a member of the Lambent Kith Nebula – a species of sentient suns. In the series finale we learn that she was the oldest and first in the Nebula, who left them to protect Dylan Hunt, as the Paradine have always protected the Lambent Kith. The suns of the Lambent Kith Nebula are the enemies of the Abyss, and aim to destroy it. Trance has special powers and abilities. For instance, she can transform into a model of her own Sun and go supernova at will. She attempts to destroy the Magog Worldship with this ability and appears successful at first, but is instead badly crippled by her efforts.

Trance plays a critical role during the Nietzschean Secession, in which the crew of the Andromeda fought with former crewmember Tyr Anasazi to obtain passage to the Route of Ages.

When the Andromeda crew is in Seefra, Trance is in her Sun state, known as the core creature. Once in humanoid form, she has no recollection of her identity or capabilities. She later displays the ability to tesseract at will. (For example, on Seefra-2 she meets Ione, a man who turns out to be the missing Moon of Tarn-Vedra.) Later, she is sealed into Methus-2, the artificial Sun of the Seefra system, and rescued by Captains Hunt and Rhade.

Trance discovers that her "people", the Lambent Kith Nebula, have come under the spell of the Abyss. She decides to use her Sun to destroy the Abyss. During the final battle, Trance drags her Sun behind the Andromeda into the Route of Ages, destroying the Abyss. Afterwards she seems to receive a message from her Sun, which she gleefully relays as "It is my Sun. The Abyss is dead!"

In Robert Hewitt Wolfe's original plan for Andromeda, Trance Gemini's race (Solar avatars) would have been the "Lightbringers", or "Lucifers", who waged war in "Heaven" - the original state of the Universe as infinitesimally small, perfect Space, or the Primordial Black Hole - resulting in the Big Bang. The Spirit of the Abyss was conceived of as an embodiment of Love (a "twisted stalker" sort of love, in this case gravity bringing the Universe to crash back in on itself - the cycle and duality of the nature of reality expressed). Rather than being the avatar for the Vedran Sun, Trance Gemini would have been, "a Sun in the Gemini constellation dreaming it is a person", hence the character's name. Wolfe's version was overwritten when he was replaced by Bob Engels as head writer and producer for Andromeda. It was, however, released online as a 20-page story, entitled "Andromeda Coda".

=== Behemial Far Traveler (Rev Bem) ===
Behemial Far Traveler (Rev Bem)
- First appearance: Season 1
- Last appearance: Season 4
- Portrayed by: Brent Stait

In-universe information
- Species: Magog
- Gender: N/A
- Affiliation: New Systems Commonwealth; Andromeda Ascendant; Eureka Maru; Wayism

Rev Bem, also known as Reverend Behemial Far Traveler, was played by actor Brent Stait. The name "Bem" refers to "bug-eyed monster", a nickname for science fiction aliens.

He is a Magog and a devout member of the Wayist religion, therefore he has to control his baser instincts to kill other living beings for food, or forcibly infest them with Magog eggs (the offspring eat their host) for reproduction. His full Wayist name is Reverend Behemial Far Traveler, shortened to Rev Bem. His original name is a series of loud screeches in his native Magog tongue. The closest English translation is Red Plague. Rev Bem is kind and understanding when most beings he encounters greet him with a shriek of terror and aim a weapon at him; indeed, Dylan once said that Rev was the closest thing to a savior he had ever met. He commonly served as the ship's physicist and psychiatrist during his time on the ship, providing someone for the crew to talk to about their problems and performing scientific analysis of recent discoveries. The most noble detail about his personality is his refusal to fire weapons or kill any beings despite the danger the crew face; when he was once forced to kill Magog in self-defence when the Andromeda first encountered the Magog worldship and the Spirit of the Abyss, he subsequently starved himself for several weeks to make up for his actions. He dealt with his physiological need to kill his food by cultivating salmon, which he killed painlessly immediately before devouring them.

During a visit to a people with perfect genetic memory who were being taught the values of Wayism and faced threat from slavers, Rev Bem's genetic material was extracted by a woman who infested herself with his larval offspring. Although he was an unwilling participant in the event, Rev nevertheless allowed the children to be born, hoping that the 'mother's' genetic memory would result in the creation of Magog with some degree of innocence. After the birth, this hope was proved to be correct; while the children were initially indiscriminately violent, they demonstrated a willingness to cooperate with humans shortly after birth that had never been seen in a Magog before.

Rev Bem's last appearance as a regular cast member was in the mid-second-season episode "Ouroboros", where he departed to try to find himself, his faith tested after the confrontation with the Abyss. He guest starred in the third-season episode "What Happens to a Rev Deferred?", in which he undergoes a final transformation that purges his Magog nature, and in the fourth season episode "Fear Burns Down to Ashes".

Though it is commonly said that Stait left Andromeda due to an allergic reaction to the prosthetics his character required, a 2011 interview revealed his departure was motivated by "physical exhaustion" from wearing the full Rev Bem costume.

=== Rommie (Andromeda) ===
Rommie (Andromeda)
- First appearance: Season 1
- Last appearance: Season 5
- Portrayed by: Lexa Doig

In-universe information
- Species: Android; Warship Avatar
- Gender: Female
- Affiliation: New Systems Commonwealth; Andromeda Ascendant

Rommie was played by Canadian actress Lexa Doig. In the show Rommie (short for Andromeda) is the humanoid avatar of the Andromeda Ascendant, a starship in the TV series. She was built and given material form as an android by the engineer Seamus Harper, who also seems to be infatuated with his work.

As a ship's avatar, Rommie is a unique aspect of the Andromeda's AI, which also manifests itself as a hologram and an on-screen image. Early on in the series, it is stated that avatars were created to allow the crew to relate to their ship on a more human level, and vice versa. Her personality, though, is largely defined by her function: "I am a warship, and I don't like walking away from a fight," is one of her recurring lines. She is very loyal to her crew, especially to her captain Dylan Hunt, and incredibly protective of those in her charge. She is confident, direct, and often displays a sense of pride in her status as a warship capable of destroying entire populations.

Since her creation, Rommie is shown to have evolved differently from the ship's AI. Rommie maintains a certain amount of individuality and is distinct from the core AI to a larger, yet unspecified degree; they are often seen chatting, disagreeing and even arguing. These disagreements often occur because Rommie exhibits human emotions more deeply and far stronger than the logic-oriented core AI. This can be seen to great effect in the Season One episode "Star Crossed," in which Rommie falls in love with another ship avatar, Gabriel. Rommie's individuality also protects her from some of the ailments that afflict Andromeda's AI, such as the reprogramming accidentally triggered by Harper during the episode "...Its Hour Come 'Round at Last." In this episode, Harper accidentally activates a version of the ship AI that had been deleted (apparently) after a failed mission; the ship's AI is reprogrammed to try and resume its original mission, with the result that it forgets about the current crew and situation, while the android is unaffected and stays with the crew. At other times, however, if the ship itself is damaged or infected, Rommie is also shut down.

Rommie's nature as an artificial construct provides her abilities that would be considered superpowers by humans, such as super strength and speed, resistance to injury and heightened senses. Using the sensors in her hands and eyes, she can detect the physiological signs associated with lying and diagnose internal injuries. Rommie also exhibits near complete awareness of and control over the workings of the ship itself. For example, she is able to change the level of artificial gravity in a given location or turn lights on or off merely by thinking the commands. She is also capable of instantaneously changing parts of her appearance, most notably the length, cut and colour of her hair.

In the Season Four finale, Rommie's body is destroyed while protecting Harper from Magog in a scene that loosely mirrors a scene from the Season One finale. All that is left is her partially damaged head and her core AI. Harper was unable to rebuild her due to the lack of sophisticated technology in the Seefra system. His attempts to virtually connect with her AI failed, as she became hostile. Dylan was later able to convince her to shut herself down. Rommie was eventually put into a new gynoid body built by Doyle. At first she almost killed the entire crew, due in part to the use of Vedran technology in building her new body; however, she was able to be repaired and, after working out some competitive issues between her original AI and Doyle, returned to her usual place in the crew.

Due to Lexa Doig's pregnancy during the filming of the fifth season of Andromeda, writers re-wrote part of the season finale so her character could be excluded from the first two thirds of Season 5. The character Doyle was written to replace her during this time. Rommie's 'new' body is thicker and bustier than her old body, due to the physiological changes that occur in a woman during pregnancy and child birth, and upon being asked by Dylan how she felt, Rommie answered "Sturdy." Before coming to Andromeda, Lexa Doig starred in the science-fiction horror film Jason X with Andromeda co-star Lisa Ryder; however, in Jason X Lexa played a human and Lisa, who plays a human character in Andromeda, played an android.

Vincent Terrace describes the character as "very sexy and very beautiful". Dominique Mainon and James Ursini refer to the character as "the most unique" woman warrior in a "series based on Roddenberry models." Sherry Ginn discusses the character further in Our Space, Our Place: Women in the Worlds of Science Fiction Television.

=== Telemachus Rhade ===
Telemachus Rhade
- First appearance: Season 1
- Last appearance: Season 5
- Portrayed by: Steve Bacic

In-universe information
- Species: Nietzschean
- Gender: Male
- Affiliation: New Systems Commonwealth; Andromeda Ascendant

Telemachus Rhade, played by Steve Bacic, is a Nietzschean Lieutenant Commander of the Systems Commonwealth serving aboard the Andromeda Ascendant under Captain Dylan Hunt. He is also a direct descendant of Gaheris Rhade (also played by Bacic as a recurring role in several episodes, mostly as flashbacks), a former executive officer of the Andromeda who betrayed Captain Hunt and the Systems Commonwealth 300 years prior, contributing heavily to the Fall of the Commonwealth. The name originates from Telemachus (also transliterated as Telemachos or Telémakhos; literally, "far-away fighter"), a figure in Greek mythology, the son of Odysseus and Penelope. His part in the saga was described by Homer in the epic poem the Odyssey, in which his part of the story is often portrayed as a passage into manhood from childhood. In particular, the first four books of the Odyssey are sometimes referred to as the Telemachy.

Telemachus Rhade is also the genetic reincarnation of his ancestor, Gaheris Rhade, which means that he possesses exactly the same DNA sequence as Gaheris – they are genetically identical, allowing the two men to be played credibly by the same actor, as well as creating internal conflict for Dylan Hunt in his initial dealings with him.

Captain Hunt first encountered Rhade while he was an Admiral of the home defense fleet and the leader of the isolationist movement on Terazed, a planet with a large community of humans and Nietzscheans, which had maintained the traditions of the Systems Commonwealth ever since the Fall 300 years prior.

After the planet Terazed eventually joined the Systems Commonwealth, Rhade was given the rank of Lt. Commander in the Commonwealth Navy. While being transported aboard a prison ship to Terazed, a captive Tyr Anasazi, leader of the newly united Nietzschean Prides, escaped Rhade's custody. Rhade was subsequently arrested by the Systems Commonwealth and (illegally) freed from his Collector prison by Andromeda's captain Dylan Hunt. Rhade and the Andromeda crew discovered Tyr Anasazi's prize, a map to the Route of Ages. He sought to weaken the Abyss and find a way to rid the universe of the Magog. On traversing the Route, Rhade assisted in attacking the Spirit of the Abyss as well as killing Tyr Anasazi, before escaping back to the 'normal' universe. After this Telemachus Rhade joined the Andromeda crew permanently.

A passionate and intense philosophical warrior, his love interests include a Nietzschean woman named Louisa Messereau, who died fighting by his side during the Magog invasion of Arkology and his wife Jillian with whom he has three sons, although he thinks they're dead. In the final episode of Season 5 he learns they survived and leaves Andromeda to be with them even though Beka tries to convince him to come with her for safety. After Andromeda destroys the Spirit of the Abyss, he is one of the survivors who comes through the new Slipstream portal to the Seefra System in a Slipfighter. During season 5, after a woman he fell in love with died during a battle with the Magog, Rhade changed, drinking often and heavily and blaming Dylan for everything. He later regained his full loyalty after the arrival of the Stranger from the future.

== Recurring characters ==
=== Gaheris Rhade ===
Gaheris Rhade
- Portrayed by: Steve Bacic

In-universe information
- Species: Nietzschean
- Gender: Male
- Affiliation: Systems Commonwealth/Nietzschean Alliance

Gaheris Rhade, played by actor Steve Bacic, is a Nietzschean. His name alludes to Gaheris, a figure of Arthurian legend, a knight of the Round Table. The name Rhadé derives from a clan of the Montagnards who aided American soldiers during the Vietnam War.

Gaheris Rhade was Dylan Hunt's original executive officer on the Andromeda Ascendant, his best friend and was to be the best man at Dylan's wedding to Sara Riley. They had first met when both were working for Argosy Special Operations, an elite division of the Commonwealth High Guard.

Gaheris was married to a Nietzschean woman and probably had several children. Rhade's surviving family did not know of his co-operation with the Nietzschean rebels, since they immediately joined Sara Riley in founding a colony of human families and loyalist Nietzschean Prides on the planet of Terazed after the rebellion. His distant descendant Telemachus Rhade who is his exact genetic reincarnation still lives there as an Admiral of the Home Guard when the Andromeda Ascendant arrives in the episode Home Fires, Episode 208. Telemachus later becomes an officer on board the Starship Andromeda.

High Guard Admiral Constanza Stark assigned Dylan and Gaheris together on a mission to kidnap the dictator Ferrin of Mobius. During the mission Rhade saved Dylan Hunt's life and was commended by the Systems Commonwealth for his bravery. After the mission, when Dylan was promoted to captain, Rhade was also assigned to the Andromeda Ascendant as his commanding first officer.

At the outset of the Nietzschean Rebellion, Gaheris Rhade sabotaged the Andromeda and tried to kill his longtime friend and commanding officer, captain Dylan Hunt. History records that Dylan Hunt managed to kill Nietzschean warrior Gaheris Rhade before becoming trapped on the event horizon of a black hole. Gaheris Rhade was labeled a traitor who served a key role in the Nietzchean Uprising against the member worlds of the Systems Commonwealth.

Gaheris Rhade's true motives were not fully revealed to the audience until the season three episode The Unconquerable Man, where he is the victor of the fight between himself and Dylan Hunt before they were trapped inside the black hole.

Gaheris Rhade is frozen in time in Dylan Hunt's place. When he was restored, he discovers that his supposedly superior race, the genetically engineered Nietzscheans, rather than building a grand unified empire, had betrayed each other and become divided, with the surviving Prides constantly engaged in war with each other. Pride Jaguar had betrayed the ruling Drago-Kazov Pride, and the Nietzschean dream of creating an intergalactic Empire never materialized. Gaheris Rhade had betrayed his oath and killed his best friend in an attempt to protect the Nietzschean people from the terrifying race of the Magog; instead, however, he had played a direct role in destroying civilization without putting a united Nietzschean empire in its place, causing the deaths and suffering of untold billions, and leaving the galaxies defenseless against the machinations of the Spirit of the Abyss, which controlled the Magog. Having sacrificed everything—murdering Dylan, betraying his oath—in the service of allowing his people to build a united Nietzschean empire, then finding that they had thrown away that opportunity to engage in civil war, Rhade became extremely embittered, mistrustful of his fellow Nietzscheans, and hating them with a passion few equalled. He was also consumed with guilt over his role in destroying civilization in general, and murdering his closest friend in particular.

Trying to rebuild the Systems Commonwealth, Rhade enlisted Beka Valentine of the Eureka Maru and her crew members Rev Bem, Trance Gemini, and Seamus Harper along with the infamous Nietzschean mercenary Tyr Anasazi to help him, constantly playing strategy games against a holographic version of his deceased best friend, Dylan Hunt. (The evidence suggests that Rommie was never constructed in this reality). However, his attempts were frustrated by failure. He attempts to get individual human and alien worlds to join him and restore the Systems Commonwealth, but most of them simply refuse, lacking faith in his dream of a Restored Commonwealth. He refused to allow any of the infamous Nietzschean Prides to join his fledgling Systems Commonwealth, which only numbered a few worlds, due only partly to his rational fear of Nietzschean treachery (he was motivated in large measure by the hatred he felt towards all Nietzscheans, feeling betrayed by his descendants because he had sacrificed everything in helping to destroy the original Commonwealth so they could build a Nietzschean empire, which they had failed to do.) His rival, Sabra-Jaguar Pride Arch Duke Charlemagne Bolivar blackmailed the leaders of several worlds, making them reluctant to sign on.

Although he had a romantic relationship with Beka Valentine, she eventually left him because she could not cope with Rhade's ruthless methods, accompanied by Rev Bem, and Gaheris Rhade was forced to kill fellow Nietzschean Tyr Anasazi when the mercenary made his long-awaited move, seeking to return to the Nietzscheans with the bones of Nietzschean Progenitor Drago Musevini, and unite them against the Spirit of the Abyss and its Magog legions, which threatened all the sentient species of the galaxies. Rhade knew that the unified Nietzschean Prides would eventually destroy his fledgling Commonwealth, and he refused to allow Tyr Anasazi to leave the Andromeda, resulting in Rhade killing him in their last confrontation. Seamus Harper stayed with Gaheris, observing Rhade was the only person he'd met who hated Nietzscheans as much as (or even more than) he did.

When Andromeda faced destruction from the tesseract machine created in an attempt to extract Harper's Magog larva, the future Trance Gemini advised him that traveling back in time to make sure Dylan Hunt lives is the only hope for a Restored Systems Commonwealth; he cannot be the man needed to restore order to the universe. Commenting that "History will remember me as a traitor for what I'm about to do", Gaheris Rhade travelled back in time and killed his past self, then took his place, reenacting his fight with his friend Dylan Hunt and deliberately allowing him to win the fight and live to restore the Systems Commonwealth. Seeking redemption, his selfless act cost him his reputation, his friendships and his life, with only a faint scar on his hand that his past self had lacked any indication of his original life (What he did with the body of his younger self was never revealed).

=== Gerentex ===
Gerentex appeared in three episodes in season one only. Gerentex is a Nightsider, and is therefore very self-absorbed and always looking for a way to make money. He is responsible for hiring the crew of the salvage ship Eureka Maru with the purpose of pulling the Andromeda Ascendant from the event horizon of a black hole at the start of the series. Gerentex fails in his plan as the Crew of the Maru turn against him to help Dylan Hunt. In response, Gerentex tries to destroy the ship declaring, "If I can't have the Andromeda, no one can". However the crew manage to save the Andromeda by launching her full complement of Nova Bombs into the black hole. Beka and Dylan then board the Maru, knock out Gerentex, and put him in a crippled escape pod in the hope he will think about his crimes and come out a better person when he reaches the nearest pleasure drift in a few months time.

In a later season one episode Gerentex reappears whilst Trance and Harper are on a drift spreading the word of the New Systems Commonwealth. He is being pursued by a bounty hunter, and to escape he takes Trance and Harper hostage and commandeers the Maru. He then embarks on a mission to find the diary of the mad Perseid that contains the last slipstream route to Tarn-Vedra. However Trance and Harper escape and take him hostage instead. They then release him at the end of the episode with a gift of the most oxygen producing flowers from the Andromeda's hydroponics garden, which had been extinct outside the Andromeda since the fall of the Commonwealth. Gerentex leaves vowing to make them pollinate so he may once again obtain a large sum of money.

=== Doyle ===
Doyle
- First appearance: Season 5
- Last appearance: Season 5
- Portrayed by: Brandy Ledford

In-universe information
- Species: Android; Warship Avatar
- Gender: Female
- Affiliation: Andromeda Ascendant; Seamus Harper

Doyle is a female android. She first appeared in season five and is played by actress Brandy Ledford. When Seamus Harper was stranded on Seefra with the malfunctioning remains of Rommie, he built Doyle to house the remaining core fragments of Rommie's AI, and to act as his bodyguard and friend.

Doyle's most distinguishing feature was her desire to be human, in sharp contrast to Rommie's whole-hearted embracing of her mechanic nature.

For three years Harper led Doyle to believe that she was human; she discovered her artificial nature and her complicated relation to Rommie at the same time, when the psychotic AI revolutionary Argent told her in a bid to win her assistance.

Eventually, Doyle came to accept her role as the Andromeda Ascendant avatar and forgave Harper for his deception. When Rommie was rebuilt and reasserted her role as the ship's avatar, the two androids had a very fractious relationship, each trying to outperform the other. By the time the season ended, they managed to reach a happy medium, and Doyle stuck around for the final battle against the Abyss for Harper's sake.

Seamus took a number of liberties with Doyle's design, including placing an access panel to her systems in an undisclosed sensitive area below her lower back. He also programmed her to experience a physical thrill whenever these controls were operated, as happened when Dylan increased the thermal output of her body in order to ignite volatile minerals during an escape attempt.

=== Elsbett Mossadim ===
Elsbett Mossadim, played by Kimberly Huie, is a Nietzschean and the first daughter of the Sabra Pride, she was first seen in the episode The Honey Offering.

Trained as a fighter from an early age for a secret mission to marry the Archduke of Pride Jaguar under a pretence of trying to form an alliance between the prides, she would then activate a Neutron Bomb killing everyone in Pride Jaguar's capital city but leaving the buildings standing. She was outmaneuvered by Dylan Hunt, who forced the Sabra and the Jaguar into an alliance in order to defend themselves from the more powerful Drago-Kazov pride, who sought to prevent their unification. Instead of continuing with her mission Elsbett wed the Archduke and unified the two prides into the Sabra-Jaguar pride. She briefly expressed a possible interest in Dylan- which Beka averted by pretending that she and Dylan were involved-, but later admitted after the marriage to the Archduke that the Archduke was not entirely unsatisfactory as a mate.

Elsbett was next encountered in the season two episode Bunker Hill. As a signatory of the mutual defense pact she coaxed Dylan- incidentally, still believing that he and Beka were involved- into assisting the Sabra-Jaguar in their continuing war with the Drago-Kazov.

=== Höhne ===
Höhne
- First appearance: Season 1
- Last appearance: Season 5
- Portrayed by: Alex Diakun

In-universe information
- Species: Perseid
- Gender: n/a (Perseids are hermaphrodites but are usually referred to as male.)
- Affiliation: Special Collections Division; All-Systems University Library

Technical Director Höhne is one of the leaders of the planet Sintii, the Perseid planet that was the first world to sign the new Commonwealth Charter. He is a scientist, and is considered one of the most brilliant minds of the age. However, as a Perseid, he is also manic, obsessive-compulsive, and more than a bit anal-retentive. He is so intensely focused on scientific research that he tends to forget the diplomatic niceties, and can really get on the nerves of people who do not share his love of knowledge. He also, incidentally, is a field operative for the Special Collections Division of the All-Systems University Library, the secret society of librarians who are trying to retain and restore the lost knowledge of the Commonwealth. He first appeared in the episode The Banks of the Lethe, when he and his assistant Rakeeb came on board the Andromeda to conduct an experiment involving a black hole. He also appeared in Into the Labyrinth as the Sintii delegate to the Mutual Defense Pact talks. Höhne appeared to have died when he fell to the bottom of the Andromeda's Slipstream Core during an attempt to remove Harper's Magog Larvae in the episode "Ouroboros", but was later seen in a Season 5 Episode, having survived, but then sacrificed himself, and therefore died again which devastated Harper. Before he died, he left Harper a message in which he expressed that he considered Harper his best friend and was grateful for that and expressed that Harper should find his destiny.

Dylan states more than once his belief that Höhne's arrival was not an accident which could mean that Höhne's story of falling into a stray teseract and above the exotic matter lenses may be only partly true. The differences could be that Höhne could have been sent into the future, but that the time interval would be longer than his stated number of three years C.Y. 10091 and Dylan's hunch is that this Höhne's arrival is more than coincidence. Since Höhne left a hologram message for Harper in which he indicates foreknowledge of his 'final' death in C.Y. 10091, the minimum amount of time that would have passed would be four years, landing him in C.Y. 10092 which would in the real world be the sixth season of Andromeda (if one was produced) and he would have also known that Trance had killed the Abyss.

=== Virgil Vox ===
A Celestial Avatar that looks exactly like Trance, but secretly works for the Spirit of the Abyss. Virgil is first introduced as another of Trance's race that appears to offer her advice when she has amnesia and appears to be an ally. She acts as Seefra's mysterious radio host, pretending to be male through a voice distorter (though she has displayed the ability to take on her other voice without it) and seems to be an ally of the Andromeda crew, explaining to Beka about the history of the Seefra system and leading her to the Methus Diagram. However, when the crew travel to Methus-2 to fix the malfunctioning sun, Virgil reveals her true colors, luring Beka into a trap that she only escapes because of Doyle and confronting Trance. When Trance refuses to go along with the Lambent Kith Nebula's plans (in reality the Abyss' plans) to destroy the Known Worlds in an attempt to destroy the Abyss, Virgil battles and defeats Trance and locks her in Methus-2's Core Chamber and takes her place among the Andromeda crew with the intention of having Trance die when the Vedran Sun consumes the star. However, her act as Trance is not convincing enough and the crew realize the truth and Dylan and Rhade rescue the real Trance just in time as Beka, Rommie, Harper and Doyle battle General Burma (another Agent of the Abyss) and his men. Virgil taunts Beka as she tries to fight Burma and is shocked by the return of the real Trance. After Burma is killed, Virgil and Trance fight, but Trance is stronger and a furious Virgil tesseracts away. Virgil returns while Dylan is battling Maura (the Avatar of the Abyss) and tells him to take Andromeda back through the Route of Ages to Seefra which he does, causing the Abyss to destroy Maura. At Seefra, Dylan explains his plan for destroying the Abyss, but the real Trance tesseracts in and exposes Virgil. Dylan is left to choose which Trance to shoot and after seeing the real Trance cry, Dylan shoots Virgil with his force lance as the Abyss has no emotions and thus it and its Agents would not cry. Virgil takes on the voice of her radio persona and taunts the crew, but Dylan shoots her again, killing her. Virgil then dissolves into smoke.
