= Dorothea Grossman =

American poet

- Born: Dorothea Gloria Dwartzin; 1937; Philadelphia, Pennsylvania, United States
- Died: May 6, 2012 (aged 74–75); Los Angeles, California, United States
- Education: Temple University
- Occupation: Poet
- Spouse: Richard Grossman
- Writing career
- Language: English

Dorothea "Dottie" Grossman (1937–2012) was an American poet active in Los Angeles, where she lived for more than 30 years. Grossman wrote short, often epigrammatic works, such as her series called "The Henny Youngman Poems", which imagined mundane and humorous glimpses of the Jewish comedian Henny Youngman. Grossman's poems have been published in four books as well as multiple poetry journals and magazines.

== Biography ==
Grossman was born in Philadelphia and attended Temple University, where she studied with Gerald Stern.

Grossman read her work regularly throughout the Los Angeles area, and was noted for her collaborations with trombonist Michael Vlatkovich and other musicians. She and Vlatkovitch released a CD entitled Call and Response in 2003.

Grossman was married to avant-garde pianist Richard Grossman until his death in 1992. She frequently addressed her husband in the first person in her poems, and cited his music as well as a wide variety of other musical genres ranging from improvisational jazz to Top 40 radio as major inspirations in her work.

In 2010, Grossman won the J. Howard and Barbara M. J. Wood Prize, awarded by Poetry magazine.

Grossman died in West Los Angeles on May 6, 2012.

== Selected works ==
- Cuttings (Tango Books, 1988)
- Poems from Cave 17: Selected Poems 1989-1996 (self-published, 1996)
- Museum of Rain (Take Out Press, 2001)
- The Fun of Speaking English (Coffeetown Press, 2012)
