= Eyes Beyond Seeing =

1995 film

- Directed by: Daniel Robert Cohn
- Produced by: Randall Emmett
- Starring: Keith Hamilton Cobb; Harry Hibbits; Henny Youngman
- Release date: 1995
- Countries: United States; Canada
- Language: English

Eyes Beyond Seeing is a 1995 spiritual drama film. Many scenes were filmed at the Kings Park Psychiatric Center on Long Island.

== Plot ==
An enigmatic, homeless mental patient (Cobb) who claims to be the second coming of Jesus Christ has been committed once again. He begins to suffer asylum life. Despite this, he befriends his psychiatrist who has lost his faith, and the man manages to change the psychiatrist's life.
