= Richard Grossman (pianist) =

Jazz pianist

Richard Grossman (November 14, 1937 – October 2, 1992) was a jazz pianist known for his work as an improviser. He began his musical career in the late 1950s in Philadelphia, moved to the Bay Area of California in 1978, to record with a band of his making in Philadelphia, Duck Soup, and moved to Los Angeles in 1979, where he lived with his wife, poet Dorothea Grossman, until his death. Over the span of his career, he collaborated with musicians including Lee Morgan, Clarence Sharpe, Reggie Workman, and Alex Cline.

== Life and career ==
Born in New York City on November 14, 1937, Grossman grew up in Mississippi and Georgia during his early life. His teenage years were spent in Pennsylvania where he attended schools in Harrisburg and Philadelphia. He began his professional career as a jazz pianist while a high school student in Philadelphia in the mid 1950s. During the latter half of the 1950s he was an active part of the post-bop jazz scene in that city, playing with musicians like trumpeter Lee Morgan; double bassists Jimmy Garrison, Henry Grimes, and Reggie Workman; and saxophonist Odean Pope to name a few.

In 1963 Grossman began playing free jazz and he led the New Music Quintet, a Philadelphia free jazz ensemble, in 1965-1965. He produced the first formal Philadelphia concert of free jazz in May 1965. From 1972-1978 he led the rock band Duck Soup, first in Philadelphia and then in San Francisco, California.

In 1978 Grossman moved to Los Angeles and was thereafter primarily active as a solo artist. He did, however, still occasionally lead small groups of musicians with whom he made a few recordings, including In the Air (1989, Nine Winds 0146) and Trio in Real Time (1989–90, Nine Winds 0134). From 1989 until his death in Los Angeles on October 2, 1992 he taught improvised music and jazz on the faculty of the Southern California Institute of Architecture.
