= Henny Youngman =

American comedian (1906–1998)

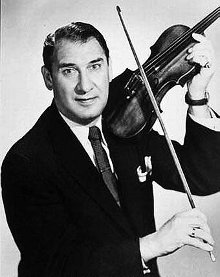
- Youngman, photographed in 1957
- Born: Henry Youngman; March 16, 1906; London, England, UK
- Died: February 24, 1998 (aged 91); New York City, New York, US
- Spouse: Sadie Cohen (m. 1928; died 1987)
- Children: 2

Comedy career
- Years active: 1923−1997
- Medium: comedy
- Genre: One-liners

Henry "Henny" Youngman (March 16, 1906 – February 24, 1998) was an American comedian and musician famous for his mastery of the "one-liner", his best known being "Take my wife... please".

Youngman's routine consisted of telling simple one-liner jokes in an age when many comedians told elaborate anecdotes; he also would occasionally perform an interlude of violin playing. His jokes depicted simple, cartoon-like situations, eliminating lengthy build-ups and going straight to the punch line. Youngman was known as "the King of the One-Liners", a title conferred by columnist Walter Winchell. His typical stage performance lasted only 15 to 20 minutes but contained dozens of jokes in rapid succession.

== Early life ==
Henry Youngman was born to Russian Jews Yonkel Yungman and Olga Chetkin in Whitechapel, in the East End of London, England. His family moved to Bay Ridge, Brooklyn, New York, when he was a child. He grew up in New York City, took violin lessons and began as a comedian after he had worked for years at a print shop, where he wrote "comedy cards" containing one-line gags. The comedy cards were discovered by up-and-coming comedian Milton Berle, who encouraged Youngman and formed a close friendship with him. Berle said about him, "The only thing funnier than Henny's jokes is his violin playing."

== Career ==
Encouraged by his family to study the violin, Youngman began in show business as a musician. He led a small jazz band called the Swanee Syncopaters, and during performances, he often told jokes. One night, the club's regular comedian did not show up and the owner asked Youngman to fill in. He enjoyed it and began his long career as a comic. His inoffensive, friendly style of comedy kept his audiences laughing for decades. He first played in clubs and speakeasies, but his break came on Kate Smith's radio show in 1937. Smith's manager Ted Collins booked him on the show, became his manager, and secured an increasing number of appearances on such highly rated network radio shows as The Fleischmann's Yeast Hour hosted by Rudy Vallee.

During the 1940s, Youngman tried to work into films as an actor, but he found little work in Hollywood. He returned to nightclubs and worked steadily, performing as many as 200 shows per year. Working with writer/producer Danny Shapiro, in 1959 Youngman recorded The Primitive Sounds of Henny Youngman, a live album for National Recording Corporation performed at the Celebrity Club in St. Louis. Later, the album was re-released as a CD.

Like many comedians, Henny Youngman treated his profession as a working job, one where making a living is difficult, and getting paid for the work is all-important. In numerous interviews, Youngman's advice to other entertainers was to nem di gelt (Yiddish for "take the money").

He was quoted in an interview with the online magazine Eye: "I get on the plane. I go and do the job, grab the money and I come home and I keep it clean. Those are my rules. Sinatra does the same thing, only he has a helicopter waiting. That's the difference."

When the New York Telephone Company started its Dial-a-Joke in 1974, over three million people called in one month to hear 30 seconds of Youngman's material—the most ever for a comedian.

Youngman never retired, and he performed his stage act in venues worldwide until his final days. As his fame passed into legendary status, he never considered himself aloof or above others, and he never refused to perform a show in a small venue or unknown club. In a tribute to Youngman, TV and animation producer Mark Evanier described him in a way that emphasized both his money consciousness and his love of performing:

He would take his fiddle and go to some hotel that had banquet rooms. He'd consult the daily directory in the lobby and find a party—usually a bar mitzvah reception—and he would go up to the room and ask to speak to whoever was paying for the affair. "I'm Henny Youngman," he would tell that person. "I was playing a date in another banquet room here and one of the waiters suggested you might want to have me do my act for your gathering here." He would negotiate whatever price he could get—$200, $500, preferably in cash—and he would do his act for them.

Roger Ebert described a similar episode in a 2011 film review:

I once observed Henny Youngman taping a TV show in the old NBC studios at the Merchandise Mart. We got into an elevator together. It stopped at the second floor, a private club. A wedding was under way. Youngman got off the elevator, asked to meet the father of the bride and said, "I'm Henny Youngman. I'll do 10 minutes for $100."

Youngman made numerous appearances on television, including a long-running stint on Rowan and Martin's Laugh-In. In 1955, he hosted a TV series entitled The Henny and Rocky Show, appearing with champion boxer Rocky Graziano. He had cameo appearances in several movies, including Won Ton Ton, the Dog Who Saved Hollywood; History of the World, Part I; and Goodfellas.

He had a larger role as the strip-club owner in Herschell Gordon Lewis's The Gore Gore Girls.

His autobiography is entitled Take My Life, Please!

Youngman's last movie appearance was in Daniel Robert Cohn's film Eyes Beyond Seeing, in which he has a cameo as a mental patient claiming to be Henny Youngman.

== Comedy routine ==
Henny Youngman's stage performances included a series of short, one-line jokes told in rapid succession. For example: "A doctor gave his patient six months to live... but he couldn't pay his bill, so he gave him another six months." Another example: "My wife's purse was stolen, but I didn't cancel her credit cards. Why should I? The guy who stole 'em spends less than she does!"

He performed while holding his trademark prop of a violin and bow, occasionally playing a short interlude of "Smoke Gets In Your Eyes" on the violin in between jokes.

== Personal life ==
Youngman's wife, Sadie Cohen, was often the butt of his jokes ("My wife said to me, 'For our anniversary I want to go somewhere I've never been before.' I said, 'Try the kitchen!'", or "My wife's cooking is fit for a king. [Gesturing as if feeding an invisible dog.] Here, King; here, King!" Also, "Last night my wife said the weather outside was fit for neither man nor beast, so we both stayed home.") In reality, though, the two were very close, with Sadie often accompanying her husband on his tours. The Youngmans remained married for 59 years until Sadie's death in 1987 after a prolonged illness. While she was ill, Henny had an ICU built in their bedroom so she could be taken care of at home (rather than in the hospital), as Sadie was terrified of hospitals.

Henny explained the origin of his classic line "Take my wife, please" as a misinterpretation: he took his wife to a radio show and asked a stagehand to escort his wife to a seat. But his request was taken as a joke, and Youngman used the line countless times ever after.

Youngman had two children, Gary and Marilyn. Gary started his career screenwriting and directing, continuing to work in the film industry in various capacities. Gary is best known for his 1976 film Rush It!

With the exception of a week following his wife's death, and the month he was in his final hospital stay, Youngman worked almost every day for over seventy years without vacations or other breaks.

== Death ==
Youngman developed pneumonia and died at Mount Sinai Medical Center in Manhattan on February 24, 1998, three weeks before his 92nd birthday. He is interred in the Mount Carmel Cemetery, Glendale, New York, next to his wife, Sadie.

== Filmography ==
- A Wave, a WAC and a Marine (1944) as O. Henry Brown
- You Can't Run Away from It (1956) as First Driver
- Nashville Rebel (1966) as himself
- The Unkissed Bride (1966) as himself
- The Gore Gore Girls (1972) as Marzdone Mobilie
- The Great Masquerade (1974) as himself
- Death Brings Roses (1975)
- Won Ton Ton, the Dog Who Saved Hollywood (1976) as Manny Farber
- Silent Movie (1976) as Fly-in-Soup Man
- History of the World, Part I (1981) as Chemist in the Roman Empire
- The Comeback Trail (1982) as himself
- National Lampoon's Movie Madness (1982) as Lawyer ("Municipalians")
- Amazon Women on the Moon (1987) as himself (segment "Roast Your Loved One")
- Goodfellas (1990) as himself
- Eyes Beyond Seeing (1995) as Mental Patient / Henny Youngman

== In poetry ==
Dorothea Grossman wrote a series called "The Henny Youngman Poems", which imagined mundane and humorous glimpses of Youngman.
