= List of Andromeda episodes =

This article is the listing of all episodes of Gene Roddenberry's Andromeda. Each season consists of 22 episodes, totaling 110 episodes over five seasons.

The 100th episode (#512, Pride Before the Fall) contains 108 seconds of outtakes (many intentional) at the end as a "thank you" to the viewers.

== Series overview ==
Season	Episodes	Originally released		
Season	Episodes	First released	Last released	Network
1	22	October 2, 2000	May 14, 2001	Syndicated
2	22	October 1, 2001	May 18, 2002	Syndicated
3	22	September 21, 2002	May 12, 2003	Syndicated
4	22	September 29, 2003	May 17, 2004	Syndicated
5	22	September 24, 2004	May 13, 2005	Sci-Fi

== Episodes ==
=== Season 1 (2000–2001) ===
The idea of the new Commonwealth proves unpopular; only six worlds actually sign the Commonwealth charter in this season. Major powers like the Than Hegemony or the Nietzschean Sabra and Jaguar prides are not really interested in the new Commonwealth; Dylan also manages to make quite a few enemies himself (including the most powerful of all Nietzschean Prides, Drago-Kazov). Dylan also encounters several dysfunctional remnants of the old High Guard and witnesses the consequences of some of his own actions 300 years before. He realizes that the old Commonwealth had made some mistakes, the repetition of which he has to avoid.

The unification of Andromeda's crew is the primary story arc of season one. Dylan's new crew does not really believe in the idea of the Commonwealth, and joins him only for personal gain. To their surprise they find that having something to fight for is not a bad thing. In the season finale, Beka, Dylan's First Officer, even promises to continue his mission if he dies.

In the season finale, Andromeda encounters the Magog World ship, a structure of twenty connected planets and an artificial sun. The World ship contains trillions of Magog and is equipped with a powerful weapon which creates miniature black holes. The season ends on a cliffhanger.

No. overall	No. in season	Title	Directed by	Written by	Original release date	Prod. code
1	1	"Under the Night"	Allan Kroeker	Robert Hewitt Wolfe	October 2, 2000	103
Captain Dylan Hunt is betrayed by his first officer when the Nietzschean prides betray the Systems Commonwealth. Stranded in his ship, the Andromeda Ascendant, near the event horizon of a black hole, Dylan is frozen in time for 300 years, until a mercenary salvage crew tries to claim the ancient ship for themselves. After a civil war leaves the universe in ruins, the last starship captain and a group of mercenaries set out to restore peace and order to the Commonwealth.
2	2	"An Affirming Flame"	Brenton Spencer	Robert Hewitt Wolfe	October 9, 2000	104
Captain Dylan Hunt attempts to drive the invaders from Andromeda. He manages to scare Gerentex off, but he leaves many of his employees behind. He takes the Eureka Maru and uses it to send the Andromeda, still without engine power, on a course back into the black hole. The remaining scavengers work with Dylan to regain engine control and break free from the gravity well. Once free, they regain control of the Maru from Gerentex and Dylan invites the survivors to join his crew and re-establish the Commonwealth.
3	3	"To Loose the Fateful Lightning"	Brenton Spencer	Matt Kiene & Joe Reinkemeyer	October 16, 2000	102
Dylan is manipulated into unlocking powerful weapons stores when the Andromeda discovers a Commonwealth space station populated by children who believe that he is the legendary "High Guard" who has come to bring peace by destroying their enemies. A group of child warriors bent on causing the destruction of solar systems is discovered on a Guard Station outside of the Dyhedra system.
4	4	"D Minus Zero"	Allan Eastman	Ashley Edward Miller & Zack Stentz	October 23, 2000	101
Dylan and the crew of the Andromeda face off against an unknown enemy when they discover a ship's recorder, forcing Dylan to deal with the tensions between him and his new crew.
5	5	"Double Helix"	Mike Rohl	Matt Kiene & Joe Reinkemeyer	October 30, 2000	106
The Andromeda finds a Nietzschean colony conducting pirate raids on a nearby Than planet. Dylan hopes that saving the Than will win support for his cause, but Tyr's loyalties are divided when the colony presents him with the opportunity to have a mate and a home if he gives them the Andromeda.
6	6	"Angel Dark, Demon Bright"	Allan Eastman	Robert Hewitt Wolfe	November 6, 2000	108
When a slipstream error throws the Andromeda back in time to the climactic battle of Nietzschean-Commonwealth war, Dylan and his crew must not only decide whether or not to interfere, but which side to interfere on. Ultimately, it is discovered that the Nietzscheans arrived at the Witchhead Nebula with 1,500 ships, three times more than was said to have been in the battle. The crew realize that their intervention is necessary to preserve history, and Dylan devises a strategy to destroy two-thirds of the massive fleet. When this plan succeeds, Tyr reveals that he knew the truth about the fleet size discrepancy all along – from a Nietzschean legend in which Andromeda's actions were attributed to "the Angel of Death" – but that no one at the time knew what really happened. With history back on track, Andromeda returns to her own time.
7	7	"The Ties That Blind"	David Warry-Smith	Story by : Ashley Edward Miller & Zack Stentz; Teleplay by : Ethlie Ann Vare	November 13, 2000	107
Answering a distress call from a Wayist vessel, Beka is surprised to find her brother aboard. Most of the crew seem suspicious of the pair of newcomers, most of all Rafe Valentine, given his sleazy history. When he steals the Maru to visit a monastery, Beka's warnings seem to be true. However, when she finds him at a Wayist monastery, she believes that he really has turned a new leaf. However, it soon becomes clear that they have an agenda of their own, connected to the 'Restors', a group of environmentalists attempting to prevent all space travel.
8	8	"The Banks of the Lethe"	David Winning	Ashley Edward Miller & Zack Stentz	November 20, 2000	109
Dylan discovers a way to communicate through a black hole with his former fiancée, on a ship sent to rescue the Andromeda in the past, but when faced with a possible reunion by transporting through time, he must decide whether to leave the future behind and abandon his mission to reform the Commonwealth. Resolving to time-travel back to the rescue ship, then return to the future with his lover, Dylan finds himself on the bridge of the Starry Wisdom just in time for a Nietzschean attack. The crew of the Wisdom trick their attackers into thinking the Andromeda is fully functional by nudging its orbit around the black hole, as Dylan sends a gravity-warped transmission threatening attack. The ruse works and the Nietzscheans leave, but Harper informs everyone that he can only lock on to Dylan to bring back. Dylan says goodbye and returns to his own time. Upon his return, he learns that while the efforts to alter Andromeda's destiny failed to free him in the past, the "nudges" made it possible for the Eureka Maru to save him in the present, so Sara saved him after all. Guest stars Sam Jenkins, Kevin Sorbo's real life wife, as Dr. Sara Riley, Captain Dylan Hunt's lost love.
9	9	"A Rose in the Ashes"	David Warry-Smith	Ethlie Ann Vare	November 27, 2000	105
While attempting to get the Arazians to rejoin the Commonwealth, he is arrested for sedition and sentenced to life imprisonment. Dylan and Rommie are imprisoned in a penal colony where no one is allowed out; even the inmates' children are forced to remain. As the ship's avatar's power source runs low, Dylan looks to an intelligent woman to help them escape. Meanwhile, with the help of Trance, the crew tracks down Dylan and Rommie's location, but discovers the colony's defenses would easily destroy the Eureka Maru. Dylan stages an uprising against the android warden of the prison and tries to shut down the defenses so that the Maru can rescue him, but is no match for the brutal warden. Rommie, knowing Dylan is in trouble, is able to use an improvised power source to recharge herself and destroys the warden, but runs out of power before she can do anything else. Dylan manages to shut down the defenses in time and the Maru safely rescues him and Rommie, but Dylan is left perplexed at how Trance randomly picked the right prison planet.
10	10	"All Great Neptune's Ocean"	Allan Harmon	Walter Jon Williams	January 15, 2001	110
Castalians come aboard to finalize the charter of the New Commonwealth. Tyr disrupts his visit by bringing up some past deeds the chancellor committed against Nietzscheans. Dylan orders Tyr to apologize, as Tyr visits the chancellor, the chancellor is killed and Tyr is found unconscious. Andromeda's crew must find the culprit.
11	11	"The Pearls That Were His Eyes"	David Winning	Ethlie Ann Vare	January 22, 2001	111
Upon nearing El Dorado Station, Beka receives a message from her 'uncle' Sid, who's in urgent trouble. She goes to meet him, with Trance in tow; Beka and Trance discover he is the leader of a large company dealing in a highly addictive drug called 'Flash'; meanwhile, the rest of the crew organize a 'garage sale' to gather money for new parts.
12	12	"The Mathematics of Tears"	T.J. Scott	Story by : Ashley Edward Miller & Zack Stentz; Teleplay by : Matt Kiene & Joe Reinkemeyer	January 29, 2001	112
While Trance has taken an unannounced vacation, Dylan and the rest of the crew investigate the remains of a derelict High Guard starship, the Pax Magellanic, with a skeleton crew who have not aged a day in 300 years, only for Andromeda to struggle with the ship's demented AI as the crew tries to piece together the mystery of what happened to the ship's slipstream drive and what caused the crew's immortality. Eventually, the mysteries are solved and the Pax is destroyed. Rommie sheds a tear for her sister's ultimate fate.
13	13	"Music of a Distant Drum"	Allan Kroeker	Robert Hewitt Wolfe	February 5, 2001	115
With the Eureka Maru having been infected by attack-nanobots that disrupt electrical systems, Tyr crash lands it on a Nietzschean controlled planet. Tyr has lost his memory. He is befriended by a small family. Some Nietzscheans arrive searching for Tyr and discover him and the crate he was transporting. Tyr must regain his memory.
14	14	"Harper 2.0"	Richard Flower	John Whelpley	February 12, 2001	113
Harper becomes a genius when a Perseid "downloads" immense amounts of knowledge into his brain. A bounty hunter arrives for the dead Perseid, and Dylan looks into why the Perseid was wanted. Unable to sleep, Harper begins to speak in various foreign languages, repair the ship, and invent new gadgets. The bounty hunter returns to recover the information the Perseid lost. Dylan and his crew discover information on the Magog.
15	15	"Forced Perspective"	George Mendeluk	Matt Kiene & Joe Reinkemeyer	February 19, 2001	114
While picking up parts for Andromeda, Dylan Hunt is arrested on charges for assassinating a planetary dictator 300 years ago, by one of the men who participated in the assassination, leaving Trance to rescue him and solve the mystery of how the man survived for three centuries. It is eventually revealed that the dictator was killed in self-defense by Gaheris Rhade, but the man set to replace him became as bad as he was and survived through cloning. When Dylan and Trance confront the man, Trance offers a peaceful solution: to abdicate power and include the rebels in the new government that forms so that everyone has a voice. The man, who had never wanted to become a tyrant, agrees.
16	16	"The Sum of Its Parts"	David Winning	Story by : Celeste Chan Wolfe; Teleplay by : Steven Barnes	February 26, 2001	118
The crew is contacted by a drone from the Consensus of Parts, a race of sentient machines who live in the space between galaxies. It claims to have been sent to make contact with them, but the drone proceeds to take over Andromeda in an attempt to escape his destruction. Through the drone, its 'master' tries to force Rommie to join the Consensus.
17	17	"Fear and Loathing in the Milky Way"	David Warry-Smith	Ashley Edward Miller & Zack Stentz	April 9, 2001	120
Gerentex kidnaps Trance and Harper and forces them to assist in his quest for power, as he claims to have discovered the location of a map to the lost Commonwealth capital, Tarn-Vedra.
18	18	"The Devil Take the Hindmost"	Allan Eastman	Ashley Edward Miller & Zack Stentz	April 16, 2001	116
While the rest of the crew of the Andromeda aid in relief efforts for a Than colony, Dylan and Rev respond to a request for aid from Rev's former master. They initially intended to help peaceful people protect themselves against slavers, but matters become complicated when it is revealed they have a genetic memory, passing down their memories to their children at birth. If Dylan teaches them to kill, their descendants will always remember how to take a life.
19	19	"The Honey Offering"	Brad Turner	Matt Kiene & Joe Reinkemeyer	April 23, 2001	121
Dylan tries to bring peace to two warring Nietzschean prides by escorting a princess of one to an arranged marriage with the other in exchange for free two systems, but when Dylan and the princess are forced to escape in the Eureka Maru while Andromeda lures away a fleet, he realizes that things aren't as they seem.
20	20	"Star-Crossed"	David Warry-Smith	Ethlie Ann Vare	April 30, 2001	117
Rommie falls in love with an android who was rescued from a destroyed ship, but she is betrayed when it is revealed that he is the avatar "Gabriel" of the warship, the Balance of Judgement, whose AI has gone insane over the years. The AI is the leader and founder of the Restor faction and Gabriel under its control, infects Rommie with a virus so she will broadcast the crew's plans to the Judgement. However, Dylan and the crew use Rommie to draw the heavy cruiser into a trap, distracting it by leaving Gabriel and Rommie alone aboard Andromeda and then deploying missiles along its trajectory from the Eureka Maru using only basic inertia. As his ship breaks apart, Gabriel is briefly freed from its control, but Rommie is forced to destroy him after discovering that the Judgement AI managed to transfer a backup copy of itself into him.
21	21	"It Makes a Lovely Light"	Michael Robison	Ethlie Ann Vare	May 7, 2001	119
For Dylan's birthday surprise, Harper overrides some of Andromeda's protocols to spring a surprise party. Beka gives him a unique gift; the map to Tarn-Vedra, the Commonwealth capital of legend, which is where Dylan was born. Beka attempts to pilot the Andromeda to Tarn-Vedra, the old capital of the Commonwealth which was cut off from the slipstream in the war. The stress of prolonged slipstream navigation causes her to become stressed and exhausted, but she seems addicted to the idea of succeeding. In desperation, she starts taking the psycho-stimulant drug 'Flash', but she succumbs to its effects and nearly dies from an overdose before Dylan and Harper can stop her.
22	22	"Its Hour Come 'Round at Last"	Allan Eastman	Robert Hewitt Wolfe	May 14, 2001	122
Harper accidentally activates a hidden personality stored away in Andromeda's system, causing her to forget the events of the past few years and re-enact a top secret mission. Since the mission pre-dates Dylan's assignment to Andromeda 300 years ago, he and the crew are powerless to stop the ship. While executing this mission, Andromeda becomes overrun by Magog.

=== Season 2 (2001–2002) ===
Season two begins with the crew of Andromeda in a seemingly hopeless situation. Dylan and Trance are revived by Beka, and Dylan goes to the Magog World ship with Rommie (the android avatar of Andromeda's AI) to recover Tyr, Harper and Rev. Harper is infested with Magog eggs, and Rev's loyalty is strained when he encounters the being the Magog call the Spirit of the Abyss. They believe it to be their creator and god. Although Dylan and Rommie rescue Tyr and Harper, Andromeda is badly damaged, Rev has a spiritual crisis, and there seems to be no possible way to extract the Magog larvae from Harper. A powerful drug will keep them dormant for a time, but it only delays the inevitable.

The season shows the crew reacting to the sudden necessity of the New Commonwealth after the discovery of the World ship (which will arrive at the Known Worlds in a few years), as they continue to make sure the dream comes true. Many worlds became more willing to sign the charter after learning of the World ship. Dylan becomes more ruthless in his actions as well. The episode "Ouroboros" (2:12) in the middle of this season became a major turning point for the whole series. "Ouroboros" was the last episode written solely by Robert Hewitt Wolfe, the show's original developer and head writer, though he returned a few episodes later to finish the writing job on "Dance of the Mayflies". The producers allegedly felt that the series was becoming too intellectual and complicated. One immediately visible change was Trance's transformation, she exchanged places with her own future version; the new Trance had a different (golden-skinned) appearance and a much more serious personality.

Brent Stait (Rev Bem) also left Andromeda in "Ouroboros" due to exhaustion, he clarified in an interview said:

I was chemically burned once but that was not due to allergy. The suit was a combination of Yak hair and synthetic, I believe, and it was very, very hot. The Latex was thick, covered my head and neck completely and the days on set were very long... I just woke up one morning and that was it. I couldn't put that suit on again. I was physically spent.

He reprises his role twice later, in seasons three and four. Ethlie Ann Vare, another writer, rounds out the list of people who departed the show this season.

In the second half of season two, the restoration of the Systems Commonwealth becomes a much less significant theme. The show mostly concentrated on Star Trek-style standalone adventures. However, by the end of the season, the new Commonwealth had gained a new powerful war fleet and a total of fifty worlds. This period also saw Kevin Sorbo reunited with his Hercules co-star Michael Hurst for one episode. Andromeda's Nietzschean crewman, Tyr Anasazi, is revealed to have a son, Tamerlane Anasazi, who is a genetic reincarnation of Drago Museveni, founder, and progenitor of the entire Nietzschean race. Since all the Nietzschean Prides believe that Museveni's genetic reincarnation will necessarily be a great leader, the Nietzschean Messiah, Tyr Anasazi gets a unique opportunity to unite all the Nietzschean Prides. He does not use it yet, biding his time.

In the season finale, the Systems Commonwealth is finally reinstated. A ceremony is held on board the Andromeda, but interrupted by the attack of unknown extra-dimensional aliens.

No. overall	No. in season	Title	Directed by	Written by	Original release date	Prod. code
23	1	"The Widening Gyre"	Allan Eastman	Robert Hewitt Wolfe	October 1, 2001	201
With the ship severely damaged and Tyr, Harper, and Rev having been abducted, Dylan leads the crew of the Andromeda in the battle against its deadliest enemy to rescue their captured crew-members. With help from Rev, who pretended to join the Magog, the group escapes and Andromeda launches a nova bomb into the World ship. However, due to the actions of the Spirit of the Abyss, the Magog leader and creator, the World ship survives, though severely damaged, while Andromeda gets away, also badly damaged. The World ship is discovered to be heading to the Known Worlds and the Commonwealth, once a dream, becomes a necessity to combat this threat.
24	2	"Exit Strategies"	T.J. Scott	Matt Kiene & Joe Reinkemeyer	October 8, 2001	202
Whilst returning to Andromeda with parts to repair Rommie, Dylan, Beka, Rev, and Tyr are pursued by a gang of Nietzscheans and are forced to make a crash landing on an icy planet. They must escape before Rev Bem's desire to feed either force him to kill or causes his body to digest itself. Harper and Rommie try to cope with their recent 'violations' by the Magog and repair the ship with Trance. Harper struggles to cope knowing there are Magog larvae living in his stomach.
25	3	"A Heart for Falsehood Framed"	David Winning	Ethlie Ann Vare	October 15, 2001	203
While docked at Peirpont Drift, a cop recognizes Beka and Seamus and notes that they are wanted for various crimes, but for some reason do not arrest them. Matters become complicated when Beka develops a relationship with the security chief on the station, who is a former thief known as 'Schrödinger's cat'. Meanwhile, Dylan tries to mediate a disagreement between the Than and an ally of the Free Trade Alliance. The crew must steal a jewel being fought over by a greedy Drift-owner and the Than to organize a peace treaty.
26	4	"Pitiless as the Sun"	Richard Flower	Emily Skopov	October 22, 2001	209
A somewhat xenophobic planet Inari, asks the Andromeda for help when its cargo vessels are attacked by unknown vessels. Trance is interrogated by that same species as they try to determine her origins, blaming one of her kind for inciting a civil war.
27	5	"Last Call at the Broken Hammer"	David Winning	Story by : Robert Hewitt Wolfe; Teleplay by : John Lloyd Parry	October 29, 2001	206
Dylan and crew attempt to find a long-lost Commonwealth leader, Ortiz, and bring her back into the fold, but the question of her identity proves more complicated than it initially appears. And while trying to protect her from the people who want her dead, Trance loses her tail. After faking her death to her pursuers, she joins the fight to rebuild the Commonwealth with Andromeda's crew.
28	6	"All Too Human"	T.J. Scott	Ashley Edward Miller & Zack Stentz	November 5, 2001	204
While Rommie tries to save a defector from a planet that hates AI's, the Eureka Maru plunges deep into the ocean after being crippled, leaving Harper, Tyr, and Rev struggling for survival as Dylan, Beka, and Trance attempt to stop a planet-destroying ship armed with Magog weapons. After saving Mobius they rush back to save their crew. Back on their crippled ship it soon becomes up to Tyr and Rev to save the ship, for Harper overdoses on his medication to keep the Magog eggs from hatching and falls into a coma. Rommie's defector is killed by its people. She finds out that the planet has allied itself with the Magog and has a ship, but she steals and rescues Rev, Tyr, Harper, and the Eureka Maru.
29	7	"Una Salus Victus"	Allan Kroeker	Ashley Edward Miller & Zack Stentz	November 12, 2001	207
With a deadly plague on the loose, Andromeda, captained by the inexperienced Harper escorts medical ships through Drago-Kazov space while Beka seeks stragglers from the convoy. When both Beka's ship and her enemy ships are damaged by each other, both women talk as they work to get their ships repaired in order to destroy the other one's ship. Harper finds being a captain is not as easy as it seems. In the end, Beka proves she is the better repairman and destroys the enemy's ship, but not before both women get the chance to understand each other's families and cultures. Dylan and Tyr try to stop the missile batteries trained on them; even if it means killing themselves along with their enemies, making the enemy surrender, but at a cost of wanting not just Tyr dead, but Andromeda's crew as well. Dylan gets an explanation about Tyr's "special cargo", which causes him to mistrust Tyr's intentions. After their mission is complete, Dylan denies Tyr access to his cargo, which in turn causes Tyr to mistrust Dylan, and shows that his "little stunt" has proven that he is vulnerable.
30	8	"Home Fires"	Michael Robison	Ethlie Ann Vare	November 19, 2001	205
Andromeda discovers a planet of Commonwealth survivors and descendants gathered together by Dylan's former fiancée after the Commonwealth fell, including the genetic reincarnation of Dylan's first officer Rhade. The colony has flourished. They have heard of the new Commonwealth. Some want to join, others feel they shouldn't. When the election to rejoin the Commonwealth goes against Andromeda's crew, an apparent Magog attack raises several questions.
31	9	"Into the Labyrinth"	Brad Turner	Ashley Edward Miller & Zack Stentz	November 26, 2001	208
While Andromeda is hosting a diplomatic conference, Harper encounters a reporter, an agent of the Abyss, who is able to remove the Magog larvae from his guts. She offers to remove them all in exchange for the information Harper previously had downloaded into his brain. She tempts Harper to join the Magog god. A high-ranking member of the Sabra-Jaguar pride arrives at the conference unannounced to join the Commonwealth.
32	10	"The Prince"	Allan Eastman	Erik Oleson	January 19, 2002	210
The Royal family flees their planet when a coup starts. Andromeda manages to rescue one member of the royal family, a young prince. Andromeda escorts him back to his homeworld, where they hope to get him back on the throne. Dylan and Tyr are appointed the Regents to the Prince. Each of them teaches the young prince how to lead, which method will the prince choose in the end. They find themselves facing significant challenges from the revolting nobles while trying to reinstate the prince's rule and negotiate a peaceful settlement.
33	11	"Bunker Hill"	Richard Flower	Matt Kiene & Joe Reinkemeyer	January 26, 2002	211
The Sabra-Jaguar pride goes to war with the Drago-Kazov, pulling Dylan and the Andromeda along with them, as per the terms of the Commonwealth treaty. Harper receives a message from a friend on Earth pledging his support for driving the Drago-Kazov clan off of Earth. Harper attempts to get the crew of the Andromeda to head for Earth to liberate it, but Dylan refuses to take the Andromeda to Earth. Instead, Harper takes the Maru with Rommie in tow to help with the resistance. Matters are complicated when Dylan finds the fleet to be larger than he expected.
34	12	"Ouroboros"	Jorge Montesi	Robert Hewitt Wolfe	February 2, 2002	212
After Rev Bem departs to try to find himself, the Magog eggs in Harper's belly are close to hatching. Harper and Hoone work on a Tesseract Machine to remove them, unintentionally triggering 'ripples' from the future that cause parts of Andromeda to start shifting to other time periods and culminate in Trance being replaced by her future self. Future selves, old allies, new enemies all collide on Andromeda.
35	13	"Lava and Rockets"	Mike Rohl	Ashley Edward Miller & Zack Stentz	February 9, 2002	213
Tyr and Dylan try to buy parts. When they're attacked, they agree to separate. Tyr returns to the Andromeda. Dylan outruns dangerous mercenaries by kidnapping a tourist barge and her pilot, while Tyr and Rommie must put aside their differences to find Dylan before the mercenaries do, leaving Harper to try to adapt to the "new" Trance.
36	14	"Be All My Sins Remembered"	Allan Eastman	Story by : Jill Sherwin; Teleplay by : Ethlie Ann Vare	February 16, 2002	216
Beka receives news of a former crew member's death. Dylan, Beka, and Harper are called to identify the body of Beka's lost crewmate Bobby Jensen. As they travel to claim his belongings, Harper and Beka tell Dylan more about their crewmate. They discover that he is actually alive and seek to force the Andromeda to help end a revolution that he started after he left the Maru.
37	15	"Dance of the Mayflies"	J. Miles Dale	Story by : Ashley Edward Miller & Zack Stentz; Teleplay by : Robert Hewitt Wolfe	February 23, 2002	214
The Andromeda is pursued by the Than after they rescue dying people from a drift, but when the victims come back as the walking dead, it is revealed that they are under the control of a hive-mind-entity known as the Bokur that infects and kills its victims. With Beka infected and Trance being used as a vessel to communicate, Dylan, Rommie and Harper must race against time to discover a defense and save their friends before they are all infected.
38	16	"In Heaven Now Are Three"	David Warry-Smith	Story by : Celeste Chan Wolfe; Teleplay by : Emily Skopov	March 2, 2002	215
Dylan, Beka and Trance attempt to attain the mystic 'Engine of Creation', capable of rewriting the universe according to the designs of whoever possesses it before someone else gets it, resulting in a brief encounter between Trance and another of her species.
39	17	"The Things We Cannot Change"	Jorge Montesi	Ethlie Ann Vare	April 13, 2002	221
During an investigation of a black hole, the Maru suffers a hull breach with Dylan on board. Dylan is blown out into space and finds himself married with a son in a world where there are no Magog and the Commonwealth is still intact (albeit falling from prolonged war). His wife pressures him to retire from the High Guard. Meanwhile, the crew of the Andromeda attempt to recover Dylan and the Maru. This is a clip show episode.
40	18	"The Fair Unknown"	Mike Rohl	John Lloyd Parry	April 20, 2002	217
The Andromeda finds a Calderan ship ravaged by what appears to be a Vedran, the creator race of the first Commonwealth. Dylan, Trance, and Rommie must rush to save a Vedran on Ral Parthea, the nature reserve planet dear to the Vedrans, from the deadly Kaldeans, but her demands after her rescue place Dylan in a difficult position.
41	19	"Belly of the Beast"	Allan Harmon	Matt Kiene & Joe Reinkemeyer	April 27, 2002	219
Andromeda receives a request for help from a planet saying it is about to be eaten by a "mythical" beast that eats planets known as the Cetus. They soon discover it's real and are promptly swallowed by the beast, with only Dylan and Trance in the Eureka Maru trying to figure out how to save his ship and crew. Each member of the crew is plagued by doubts about their mission on board the Andromeda as Rommie begins to shut down and the ship begins to dissolve.
42	20	"The Knight, Death, and the Devil"	Richard Flower	Ashley Edward Miller & Zack Stentz	May 4, 2002	218
Andromeda gets word of a fleet of High Guard ships in Tartarus. Dylan, Rommie, and Tyr embark on a quest to liberate captured ships of the High Guard from imprisonment with the help of Ryan, an AI with knowledge of the location, hampered by their unwillingness to become the slaves that they feel they would become if they gained captains once more, Beka is forced to convince the potential fiftieth planet in the New Systems Commonwealth to sign the charter without Dylan to win them over.
43	21	"Immaculate Perception"	Brad Turner	Matt Kiene & Joe Reinkemeyer	May 11, 2002	220
The knights of Genetic purity start attacking a cluster of Nietzschean prides. Tyr races to save his wife, Freya, and her Orca pride, from attack by the Genites, humans opposed to genetically-engineered humans (a particular problem as that includes almost all of the crew of Andromeda), he discovers that not only is he a father but that his son may be the foretold genetic reincarnation of Drago Museveni.
44	22	"Tunnel at the End of the Light"	Allan Eastman	Matt Kiene & Joe Reinkemeyer	May 18, 2002	222
At finally achieving his goal of fifty parties willing to join the New Commonwealth, Dylan hosts the signing of the New Commonwealth charter on board the Andromeda. With all the delegates aboard, he takes them to a barren system to avoid any interference from outside sources but does not succeed. Mysterious beings begin attacking delegates, who can phase through walls and make themselves invisible, but when Trance reveals that this crisis resulted in the destruction of Dylan's dream of a renewed Commonwealth, and only she and Beka survived, the crew must find a way to win a fight that they lost in Trance's future.

=== Season 3 (2002–2003) ===
For season three, Bob Engels was brought on the writing staff to fill the hole in that had been left by the departure of Robert Hewitt Wolfe and Ethlie Ann Vare. This season had the most episodic format of all. The Systems Commonwealth is already reunited, but there is not much progress in the fight with the Magog and the Abyss.

Several episodes of season three explore Trance and her actual role. The season ends with Nietzscheans withdrawing from the Commonwealth and Tyr Anasazi formally leaving the Andromeda.

No. overall	No. in season	Title	Directed by	Written by	Original release date	Prod. code
45	1	"If the Wheel is Fixed"	Allan Eastman	Bob Engels	September 21, 2002	301
Dylan attempts to rescue Tyr and Beka by taking the Maru back towards the tunnel but is forced to abandon it due to a large field of debris being sucked into the tunnel. When he returns, Beka and Tyr appear on Andromeda for no apparent reason. Now that her crew has been reunited, Andromeda attempts to break free from the gravitational pull of the tunnel. During the attempt, Beka tries to slip too early, causing Andromeda to be pulled into the tunnel. Dylan quickly takes control of the helm and pulls the ship out, but Tyr and Beka both seem to be acting strangely.
46	2	"The Shards of Rimni"	Brad Turner	Bob Engels & Matt Kiene	September 28, 2002	302
After Dylan receives a strange map in the mail, he is framed for the murder of the contract killer who sent him the package, leaving him and Harper in a race against time to clear their names before Commonwealth Security catches them, as well as to find the pieces of a mythical vase said to grant the owner the 'blessings of the cosmos', a piece of which Dylan acquired before his trip to the black hole.
47	3	"Mad to be Saved"	Jorge Montesi	Matt Kiene & Joe Reinkemeyer	October 5, 2002	303
Andromeda receives a distress call from a freighter and manages to get it into the docking bay, but it is venting oxygen and the bay doors are jammed open. Dylan and Tyr manage to save most of its crew from suffocation. They are a group of refugees fleeing an oppressive dictatorship, the Andromeda crew faces serious problems when the refugees are revealed to be severely mentally unbalanced due to government experiments, each of them brainwashed to believe that they're the doctor responsible for the condition of the others.
48	4	"Cui Bono"	Brad Turner	Ashley Edward Miller & Zack Stentz	October 11, 2002	304
Andromeda transports Beka's "Uncle" Sid when he runs for the top government office in the newly reformed Commonwealth, but matters are complicated when a seemingly failed assassination attempt puts him in a coma and his company opens up a revenge account that sends bounty hunters after everybody likely to have put out the hit in the first place.
49	5	"The Lone and Level Sands"	Jorge Montesi	Ashley Edward Miller & Zack Stentz	October 21, 2002	305
After an attack by pirates, Dylan, Tyr, Harper and Rommie encounter a spacecraft from Earth that set out to explore deep space hundreds of years ago, but tensions between the ship's captain and crew result in the Andromeda crew getting caught up in a mutiny as they try to repair the slipstream drive on the Eureka Maru.
50	6	"Slipfighter the Dogs of War"	Mike Rohl	Matt Kiene & Joe Reinkemeyer	October 28, 2002	306
Trance mourns the loss of her relative, Mesmer, but in the middle of the ceremony, Andromeda is hit by many massive shockwaves, sending the ship reeling. They discover that the shockwaves emanating from a star going supernova, and signs point towards the use of a weapon similar to a nova bomb. The Andromeda crews come to the conclusion that Marduk, a rogue planet, is the source of the weapons of mass destruction, but the Andromeda needs help to achieve its goals.
51	7	"The Leper's Kiss"	Mike Rohl	Matt Kiene & Joe Reinkemeyer	November 11, 2002	307
Another "founding father", Marshall Man-Ka-Lupe, of the New Commonwealth, contacts Dylan to help in taking down a very deadly assassin named "the Leper" who is currently targeting him. He has Dylan keep this mission top-secret, even from his superiors. In order to get information on the Leper's whereabouts, Dylan promotes himself as an agent of the Leper looking to hire talent for a hit. He manages to catch the Leper's sister, Sasha, in his trap and milks her for information.
52	8	"For Whom the Bell Tolls"	Philip David Segal	Naomi Janzen	November 18, 2002	308
During a solar storm, Dylan's forced to leave Beka and Harper planetside. When he manages to pick them up, he also picks up a creature that devours the Maru's electronics, They must find a way to stop the creatures before they do permanent damage to Andromeda. Also, the Andromeda is haunted by a crew member who died over 300 years ago.
53	9	"And Your Heart Will Fly Away"	Allan Eastman	Michael Cassutt	November 25, 2002	309
An unknown armored man appears on the command deck of the Andromeda and proceeds to engage Dylan in combat with a katana. After Dylan comes out on top, Tyr leaves in Harper's new and improved slipfighter without a word. The Andromeda encounters a kilometer-tall version of Dylan that opens fire on the ship, but when the Andromeda retaliates the giant replica vanishes. After destroying this they go on but discover they have been boarded by one Bartolome Naz; he is a creator of advanced weapons systems and he is looking for Tyr apparently, he paid to murder his wife but instead he fell in love with her.
54	10	"The Unconquerable Man"	J. Miles Dale	Ashley Edward Miller & Zack Stentz	January 20, 2003	310
In an alternate universe where Dylan died before being trapped in the black hole, Gaheris Rhade sets out to restore the Commonwealth, but his increasingly strained relationship with his crew, to say nothing of his negative views on the Nietzschean prides, make this a seemingly impossible task. This is a clip show episode.
55	11	"Delenda Est"	Richard Flower	Bob Engels	January 27, 2003	311
The mysterious race that attacked the first Commonwealth Charter signing returns, and it's up to the Andromeda crew to stop them again.
56	12	"The Dark Backward"	Michael Robison	Ashley Edward Miller & Zack Stentz	February 3, 2003	312
Trance sees a probable future that results in the deaths of the entire crew and the destruction of the Andromeda. She trims a bonsai tree, resetting the scenario to try a different approach. An object approaches the Andromeda and is not swayed from its intended target, even by Andromeda's defenses. A mysterious man in black armor appears before Harper, damaging systems he had just finished repairing then disappearing. He reappears on the bridge and kills Beka before disappearing again. Trance again trims her bonsai, again resetting the incident. She runs through a series of possible outcomes in order to save the crew from a deadly intruder.
57	13	"The Risk-All Point"	Michael Robison	Matt Kiene & Joe Reinkemeyer	February 10, 2003	313
While on their way in the Maru to the launching of the first new Commonwealth starship in over 300 years, Dylan, Beka and Tyr rush ahead to warn the new battleship, the Crimson Sunrise, of an incoming Nietzschean battle group. They suspect that there is an agent on board the Sunrise, and their suspicions are confirmed when the engines go critical and the Sunrise is destroyed. Many onboard the Sunrise survived in escape pods, but they discover the pods are leaking air. As they rescue the survivors, they also investigate the sabotage and realize that the saboteur may still be among them.
58	14	"The Right Horse"	Richard Flower	Emily Skopov	February 17, 2003	314
Beka is called as a character witness for a friend on a planet where lying and deception are punishable crimes. Dylan is away at a strategic defense summit. Beka manages to get into a fight with the authorities and demands to see her friend Able Ladrone. She and Tyr break him out of prison and hide him on board the Andromeda. He was under arrest for crimes against the defense conglomerate Techno-Core, but the crew of the Andromeda, especially Beka, believe him to be innocent.
59	15	"What Happens to a Rev Deferred?"	Allan Eastman	Matt Kiene & Joe Reinkemeyer	February 24, 2003	315
The Andromeda is supervising an evacuation of a planet doomed to explode when the crew sees a ship crewed by looters moving towards the planet instead of away from it. They receive a garbled message from the last remaining inhabitant of the planet, their old friend, Rev Bem. The crew mounts a rescue operation for Rev, planning on taking out any looters in their way, but their plans are changed when Andromeda detects a point singularity bomb inside the planet. This is a clip show episode.
60	16	"Point of the Spear"	Allan Harmon	Ashley Edward Miller & Zack Stentz	March 31, 2003	316
A newly colonized planet of the Commonwealth comes under attack by Pyrian "pyroformers", but when Dylan destroys the machines, the Pyrian fleet arrives to defend its property. Dylan hopes to talk them out of their goals, but they are not deterred. Dylan is forced into a battle he did not want, one where he is outmatched, to save the planet Samsarra and avoid a galactic war.
61	17	"Vault of the Heavens"	Jorge Montesi	Gordon Michael Woolvett	April 7, 2003	317
While in command of the Andromeda during the night shift, Harper decides to initiate a little race with a friendly Nietzschean vessel to the nearest slip-point. When he tries a trick he calls "Harper's Afterburner" to beat his rival to the slip-point and into slipstream he causes a malfunction in the engine that could cause the destruction of the Andromeda. The Andromeda receives communication from a system thousands of light-years away, but the signal appears to be only a few days old. Dylan hears voices telling him to pursue the signal to its source on a planet of "Fire and Ice" and he takes the Andromeda to the source, traveling through hostile Nietzschean-controlled space to do so.
62	18	"Deep Midnight's Voice"	Allan Harmon	Matt Kiene & Joe Reinkemeyer	April 14, 2003	318
The Andromeda gets caught in the middle of a battle between two Nietzschean prides, one of which is the Drago-Kazov. They manage to capture a hostile fighter from the unknown pride. He reveals that the Drago-Kazov believe that his pride has in its possession a legendary Nietzschean slip-scout, the Midnight's Voice, claimed to have mapped billions of transit points in the slipstream, as well as the slipstream itself. Dylan looks into the near-mythic tale of the Midnight's Voice while Tyr interrogates their Nietzschean captive. Rommie identifies the planet it most likely disappeared on. They discover it to be a planet that was colonized 10,000 years ago but the humans living there are no longer aware of their origins so any contact with them would be their first contact with the outside universe. Dylan, Beka, Tyr and Gaiton head down to the planet to find the slip-scout's map.
63	19	"The Illusion of Majesty"	Peter DeLuise	Joel Metzger	April 21, 2003	319
After exiting a rather turbulent part of slipstream, Andromeda finds itself in the middle of the Prolon system, an area full of radiation and dangerous materials, including corrosive waste. The Andromeda saves a hibernation capsule from destruction but sustains heavy damage at the hands of its pursuers, who demand that Dylan return the inhabitant, their princess who is not what she appears to be, to their custody.
64	20	"Twilight of the Idols"	Richard Flower	Ashley Edward Miller & Zack Stentz	April 28, 2003	320
Andromeda and her crew set out to find a colony of Nietzscheans that have disappeared. Andromeda encounters a group who has secretly been supporting them. Their leader claims to have a connection to the old Commonwealth. When Dylan hears the claims, he starts to have doubts.
65	21	"Day of Judgement, Day of Wrath"	Allan Eastman	Ashley Edward Miller & Zack Stentz	May 5, 2003	321
Tyr leaves the Andromeda while it is in dry-dock for repairs to seek out other survivors of his pride. The Balance of Judgement returns, taking over a new High Guard ship and Rommie. It is revealed that when it was destroyed, it transferred a copy of itself into Rommie as well as Gabriel. Using Rommie, the AI takes over the Resolution of Hector and forces Harper to build a new Avatar it names Remiel. Andromeda tracks down the ship and disables it while Dylan and Hector, the Avatar of the Resolution board the ship to stop Remiel and the AI. They free Rommie but are unable to defeat Remiel who kills Hector. However, Rommie manages to break through to the Balance AI and convince it to stop, reminding it of its original purpose as a High Guard ship. Remiel refuses to give up and tries to escape, but Rommie and Dylan blow him into space. Later all traces of the Balance AI are removed from the Resolution and Rommie.
66	22	"Shadows Cast by a Final Salute"	Jorge Montesi	Bob Engels	May 12, 2003	322
The Drago-Kazov clan begin a war against the Commonwealth and others. Tyr shows his true intentions. He has convinced the Nietzscheans as the genetic reincarnation of Drago Museveni - progenitor of his race. The Commonwealth fleet is lured into an ambush and later destroyed. Tyr tries to force Dylan into a decision to either save his crew or sacrifice Andromeda.

=== Season 4 (2003–2004) ===
Season four marked an extreme change in the writing staff. The writing team of Zack Stentz and Ashley Edward Miller, who had been with the show from the beginning and written more episodes of season three than anyone else, did not return for season four. The writing team of Matt Kiene and Joe Reinkemeyer, who had also been with the show from the beginning and who had written almost as many seasons three episodes as Zack and Ash, also did not return for season four, though Kiene did write a single episode on his own. The weight was mostly taken up by new writers: Larry and Paul Barber, who had no previous involvement with the show, wrote the bulk of season four. Other newcomers included Ted Mann, Scott Frost, John Kirk, Lawrence Meyers, and the team of Lu Abbott and Stacey Berman-Woodward, none of whom contributed more than one episode. Naomi Janzen, who had only written a single episode in the show's first three seasons put together, wrote four episodes in this season.

Dylan is nearly outlawed by the Systems Commonwealth he restored. The Collectors (originally keepers of historical information unknown to anyone else), allied with the Spirit of the Abyss, manipulate the fragile government of the New Commonwealth to show him in a bad light. The Abyss infiltrates the Commonwealth using many other agents as well. Eventually, the Collectors unite with Tyr Anasazi and his newly united Nietzschean Prides. Tyr mistrusts the Spirit of the Abyss and hopes to defeat it. He tries to find a map to the Route of Ages, a portal connecting all galaxies together. It is possible to weaken the Abyss by passing through it. Dylan gets the map instead but he allows Tyr to follow Andromeda through the Route of Ages as Tyr knows more about the Abyss. Andromeda is transported into a weird universe where thoughts manifest as reality. With Trance's help, Dylan defeats and kills Tyr who tried to make a deal with the Abyss.

Since the Route of Ages closes before the Andromeda can return, Dylan has to use Trance's help. She reveals that she is the Avatar of the Sun, with "the power to create and destroy". Trance destroys Andromeda and recreates it in the right universe. In this season, Dylan also finds a new crew member — Nietzschean Telemachus Rhade, who does not accept his race's betrayal of the Commonwealth and agrees to join Dylan. Rhade proves to be more manageable than Tyr Anasazi, whom he helped Dylan defeat. The Magog evolve and become more intelligent and cunning. In the season finale, their World ship is rediscovered. It is heading towards the Arkology, an old space station with a pacifist population. Dylan frantically tries to convince them that they have to defend themselves but the people of the Arkology hope to make peace with the Magog.

They pay dearly for that mistake, as the Magog never makes peace with anyone. Andromeda tries to defend the Arkology against the World ship, but is horribly outnumbered. The Arkology is destroyed along with all of its inhabitants. Rhade, Beka and Harper are left in absolutely hopeless situations. Rommie explodes after being shot through her stomach while saving Harper from the Magog. Trance asks Dylan to escape on a slip fighter through the Route of Ages, claiming that now there is nothing more important than saving his life; Marlowe, Arkology's leader (who had disappeared several hours before the battle) tells Dylan that they both are Paradine, two of the few ancient beings with incredible powers. Dylan reluctantly leaves through the Route (in a strange sequence where he finds himself in a large dark room and seemingly meets another version of himself). Trance turns into a sun and crashes into the World ship on the Andromeda.

No. overall	No. in season	Title	Directed by	Written by	Original release date	Prod. code
67	1	"Answers Given to Questions Never Asked"	Jorge Montesi	Bob Engels	September 29, 2003	401
Dylan receives a message from a collector claiming to have a hostage, and finds the remains of the Commonwealth fleet, leading them to the All Forces nullification point. They need to restore order to the Commonwealth.
68	2	"Pieces of Eight"	Jorge Montesi	Larry Barber & Paul Barber	October 6, 2003	402
The governing body of the Commonwealth has voted "no-confidence" in triumvir Tri-Jema, she sends Dylan to get the Andromeda refitted and visit an augur, who is told to be infallible. This augur, dubbed Citizen Eight, aims to take Tri-Jema's place as triumvir and, according to the triumvir, remove Dylan from command of the Andromeda. The robots sent to the Andromeda to start pre-upgrade repairs turn against the crew, forcing Dylan and Harper to shut them down. Dylan must deal with Citizen Eight before he can bring down the Commonwealth from within.
69	3	"Waking the Tyrant's Device"	Andrew Potter	Larry Barber & Paul Barber	October 13, 2003	403
Dylan's sent on a mission but isn't informed of the danger he faces. Andromeda's captured by a gravity field which is the target of their mission. Dylan discovers the moon's base of Kroton, a half-human, a half-android genius who created the Magog world ship. Ultimately the new World ship is destroyed, but the builder manages to escape.
70	4	"Double or Nothingness"	David Winning	John Whelpley	October 20, 2003	404
Andromeda investigates the site of a reported Nietzschean attack on a Commonwealth battleship but finds no sign of any conflict has occurred. Dylan is kidnapped and forced to play mind games for the amusement and monetary gain of weapon dealers. Dylan must deal with the Nietzscheans in order to uncover the truth of what happened in orbit.
71	5	"Harper/Delete"	Richard Flower	Naomi Janzen	October 27, 2003	405
"File D", a flexy that can erase people's minds, is in the hands of two Nietzschean siblings. One has a weapon which can eliminate higher brain function, whereas the other has her nephew hostage, with Andromeda and Harper trying to prevent its activation.
72	6	"Soon the Nearing Vortex"	Brad Turner	Larry Barber & Paul Barber	November 3, 2003	406
Telemachus Rhade, now a High Guard Lieutenant Commander, loses his prison transport in a battle with the Nietzscheans along with his only prisoner; Tyr Anasazi. Dylan welcomes Rhade aboard the Andromeda in order to recapture his former comrade. Tyr Anasazi joins with the Collectors to find the Route of Ages, thinking it will stop the Abyss. Tyr returns to Dylan to uncover the secret behind the Route of Ages.
73	7	"The World Turns All Around Her"	Peter DeLuise	Larry Barber & Paul Barber	November 10, 2003	407
The Collectors tell Tyr why they need the map for the Route of Ages. It's a map to the Abyss, and hopefully, a way to contain it. Tyr has Beka and the crew has the map. Now it's a race to the Route of Ages. Beka and Tyr are pulled through the Route of Ages, where the crew of the Andromeda pursues and confronts Tyr as he prepares to offer Dylan to the Abyss in exchange for Nietzschean safety in the upcoming war. Dylan and Rhade rescue Beka but are forced to kill Tyr as they escape. After Andromeda gets trapped in the Route of Ages, Trance reveals her true nature as the Avatar of a Sun and saves the crew, though only Dylan is aware of the truth.
74	8	"Conduit to Destiny"	Pat Williams	Lawrence Meyers	November 17, 2003	408
Andromeda receives a distress call from a Commonwealth prison, experiencing a riot the likes of which they've never dealt with before. Fate brings Dylan full circle to fulfill a planet’s destiny 300 years in the making when the crew return to a planet where a woman is supposed to merge with a power source. Dylan helps her do so and defeats the person trying to use her for her own gain and reveals that he was the mysterious soldier who had saved her life 300 years before and never returned as promised because he got trapped in the black hole.
75	9	"Machinery of the Mind"	David Winning	Ted Mann	January 12, 2004	409
Harper's key note speaker at a conference on dealing with the Magog threat. When a scientist is kidnapped, the crew thwarts an assassin’s attempt to steal the minds of the Commonwealth’s most brilliant scientists. Meanwhile, Dylan's kidnapped by the Collectors, who make him an offer.
76	10	"Exalted Reason, Resplendent Daughter"	Richard Flower	Naomi Janzen	January 19, 2004	410
Dylan hunts down a notorious outlaw who has kidnapped a Commonwealth leader’s daughter, Aleyiss San. Things are revealed to not be what they seem: the daughter was set up to be murdered by her insane father. Shineoa San, the self-proclaimed king of an important Commonwealth system, and the outlaw are actually more of a Robin Hood-type character than a villain. After stopping the woman's attempted assassination by her own father, Dylan invites the outlaw and his coalition of more than 1,100 planets to join the Commonwealth in exchange for his freedom and allowing him to marry the woman.
77	11	"The Torment, the Release"	Jorge Montesi	Bob Engels	January 26, 2004	411
Dylan being arrested and put on trial for treason against the Commonwealth was created. Leading the prosecution is Pish Tryan, a Collector with who Dylan has crossed paths before. Pish manages to requisition Rommie's files and proceeds to use recordings of previous events against Dylan. Meanwhile, his friends back on Andromeda are planning to help him get out of this potentially dangerous situation. Ultimately though Dylan will discover who amongst the senior Commonwealth still supports him and who is happy to have the Collectors controlling the Commonwealth. This is a clip show episode.
78	12	"The Spider's Stratagem"	Brad Turner	Emily Skopov	February 2, 2004	412
Andromeda dealing with Moldar, an oppressive ruler, who denies that he has anything to do with anything untoward. Then known smuggler Rox Nava is spotted in the system. Scans suggest she is smuggling people but when her ship is captured there are no signs of anybody... it turns out she is smuggling living bio-armor. The technology is like nothing in the Commonwealth so Dylan is determined to find its origin so he and Rox head to the planet she collected it from. Meanwhile, Beka and Rhade deliver a consignment of armor and discover just how dangerous it is.
79	13	"The Warmth of an Invisible Light"	Jorge Montesi	Matt Kiene	February 9, 2004	413
While trying to escape pursuing ships and low on fuel, Andromeda ends up in a dead galaxy and tries a new device of Harper's, which accidentally transfers Dylan to an alternate universe where he died a hero after stopping the Nietzschean rebellion 300 years earlier and Andromeda has been turned into a museum. In the new reality, the Commonwealth never fell, but Harper, now part cybernetic and manipulated by the Abyss, has taken it over with Rhade as his second in command and Beka the general of the rebellion. Dylan teams up with the alternate Rommie and a part of Trance that enters that reality looking for him to stop Harper. With the help of Beka, Dylan leads a counter-rebellion on board Andromeda and tries to reach out to Harper, believing he still has good in him. Alternate Rommie and Beka defeat Harper's forces, but Rhade activates Andromeda's self-destruct. Harper, whom Dylan did reach, decides to surrender, but Rhade kills him as the self-destruct reaches zero. However, Andromeda reveals she tricked him and orders Rhade to surrender as Harper's rule has now been overthrown. Beka and Rommie plan to work together to restore the Commonwealth to its former glory with the help of the Andromeda and Dylan has Trance return him to his world with Harper's device. Before she does, Trance gives him a "gift," the word "Amalthea" and upon his return, Dylan finds out he has only been gone thirty seconds. There, he learns that by rigging up the Eureka Maru to the Andromeda, the ship can now reach a nearby star, but unless one goes supernova, they won't be able to refuel. Dylan learns that one of the stars is Amalthea and orders Andromeda to it. Amalthea goes supernova and Andromeda is able to refuel. Trance mourns the loss of Amalthea as the star sacrificed itself for Andromeda.
80	14	"The Others"	Peter DeLuise	Scott Frost	February 16, 2004	414
When Andromeda comes across two relatively primitive ships that appear to have fought till they exhausted fuel and weapons both are brought on board in separate hangars. Each has one person on board who explains that they are on either side of a planetary civil war that has gone on for generations. Of course, each side blames the other. General Lach, of the northern race, accuses the southerners of unleashing biological weapons that have infected most of the North while Southerner Zara claims the North attacked the peace-loving South while denying the use of such weapons. An attempt to get them to talk goes horrible wrong when Lach bites Dylan, infecting him with the disease. It acts faster on him because he is a heavy-worlder. In an attempt to find a cure Rhade accompanies Lach to the northern settlement while Beka and Harper go with Zara to the southern encampment; before they can get the data that might help things go wrong and it looks as though they will be caught up in a major battle.
81	15	"Fear Burns Down to Ashes"	Peter DeLuise	John Kirk	February 23, 2004	415
Rev Bem contacts Dylan and tells him he will show him the weapon to defeat the Abyss but he must come alone. They meet on an infamously dangerous planet and Rev Bem's behavior seems rather different. Rev helps the Collectors capture and drug Dylan. When Dylan awakens he is aboard a dead ship heading into a black hole. When the rest of the crew realize something has happened to Dylan they follow clues that lead them to a Collector scientist who may be their only hope of finding Dylan.
82	16	"Lost in a Space that isn't There"	Peter DeLuise	Naomi Janzen, Paul Barber & Larry Barber	April 5, 2004	416
The crew discovers that Beka's behavior is being influenced by the Abyss after a Restorian attack, forcing Dylan to carry out a dangerous plan to rid her of its influence by traveling into Beka's mind. Dylan ultimately manages to trap the Abyss in a VR matrix, but it starts to take over Andromeda so Trance enters the matrix and uses her powers to defeat it. This is a clip show episode.
83	17	"Abridging the Devil's Divide"	Peter DeLuise	Gordon Michael Woolvett	April 12, 2004	417
Dylan, Harper and Rhade are aboard the Eureka Maru investigating the smuggling of certain minerals when they are attacked by people looking for Harper. They are eventually caught and it emerges that The Patriarch is still alive and he needs Harper's engineering know-how. He is planning to build a bridge between the planet and its moon. if that weren't enough to moon-end of the bridge is to be 200 years in the future. Harper agrees to help on the condition that Rhade isn't executed. Dylan tells Harper not to activate the bridge but he is desperate to find out if it works or not.
84	18	"Trusting the Gordian Maze"	Jorge Montesi	Larry Barber & Paul Barber	April 19, 2004	418
Indra Xicol, an emissary of Tri-Jema, arrives with an offer of peace. In return it is expected that Dylan will hand over the Route of Ages, unfortunately, it appears to have been stolen. Luckily there is a copy but that is hidden in a maze within a maze; looked after by a rather difficult couple. Dylan, Rhade and Indra's head to retrieve the copy from the couple looking after it. Rhade is soon separated from the other two. As they search together Dylan and Indra appear to be getting closer but can she really be trusted. Meanwhile, Tri-Jema arrives in a fleet and threatens Andromeda.
85	19	"A Symmetry of Imperfection"	Allan Harmon	Naomi Janzen	April 26, 2004	419
When Beka and a couple of lancers visit a remote colony. Contact is lost so Dylan and Trance head down to help. Beka finds no sign of settlers and soon it is obvious why; the planet is crawling with Magog. The lancers are lost but Dylan manages to rescue Beka, just in time to see a massive Magog ship arrive. Rommie sees it and orders Andromeda into the slipstream. Dylan is rather surprised but hides the Eureka Maru in an asteroid field until Rhade returns in a slip-fighter to guide them back. Their problems are far from over though; Andromeda has determined that Rommie, her autonomous avatar, is becoming too emotional so disconnected her from the system before running a complete scan of the ship's systems. While this is going on Andromeda refuses all orders; this makes it hard for those on the Maru to get back aboard and once they do get back they have to figure a way to fight off the Magog when they inevitably arrive.
86	20	"Time Out of Mind"	Allan Harmon	Lu Abbott & Stacey Berman-Woodward	May 3, 2004	420
Three Wayists are being transported aboard the Maru, except they aren't actually Wayists. Two of them turn on the third demanding he hand over a certain item; they are defeated but not before their victim is fatally wounded. Before he dies we learn that he is Wezlow, a True Collector who had worked aboard the Maru when Beka was a child. He makes it clear that she has something that the Abyss fears; but what she doesn't know. An item he was carrying leads the crew of the Andromeda to the Collector's secret hidden archive. Here they access the last file Wezlow had looked at, it is a recording made aboard the Maru when Beka was still a child. While they are investigating the recordings an agent of the Abyss arrives intent on finding what they are looking for first.
87	21	"The Dissonant Interval (Part One)"	Martin Wood	Paul Barber & Larry Barber	May 10, 2004	421
Andromeda rescuing an unarmed ship from former Commonwealth attackers. Onboard the ship is the ambassador from Arkology, a peaceful society on a space station, who believes he has negotiated peace with the approaching Magog. Shortly afterward he collapses and dies, he was infested by Magog. Andromeda returns to Arkology with the ambassador's pilot. Arkology is a vast spaceship in orbit around a planet; it is totally unarmed and unwilling to believe that they are in danger. Dylan tries to persuade them that they must leave but his arguments fall on deaf ears. Dylan also learns of his true heritage as a Paradine.
88	22	"The Dissonant Interval (Part Two)"	Martin Wood	Bob Engels	May 17, 2004	422
When Dylan can't move the Arkology, he chooses a standoff which he can't win. Things go badly: Rhade is surrounded, Rommie is destroyed, Harper is found by a Magog, and Beka is presumed killed, while Arkology is destroyed and Andromeda is invaded by Magog and severely damaged with the only survivors being Trance and Dylan. He tries to destroy the World ship by firing every Nova Bomb Andromeda has at it, but does little damage. Andromeda repels the Magog by venting her atmosphere and Trance convinces Dylan to abandon ship in a Slipfighter for the Route of Ages while she deals with the World ship. As Dylan heads into the Route of Ages, Trance pilots Andromeda into the center of the World ship, firing every missile the ship has as she goes to clear the way, saying her goodbyes. As Andromeda loses power, the ship enters the center of the World ship and Trance goes supernova apparently destroying the World ship. Dylan enters the Route of Ages where he encounters another version of himself. The two Dylans stare at each other for a moment before the other one walks away.

=== Season 5 (2004–2005) ===
Dylan Hunt reassembles the crew and adjusting the Seefra system and his newly discovered role as a Paradine, finds himself transported into the Seefra system — nine identical barren worlds with a superstitious population and two dim suns. Technology (especially spaceflight) is shunned, and water is treasured because of constant drought. Flavin, a Paradine, meets Dylan here, giving him cryptic hints about Dylan's destiny and what Seefra is before disappearing.

Dylan eventually finds Nietzschean warrior Telemachus Rhade, pilot Beka Valentine and super-genius engineer Seamus Harper on Seefra, and to his amazement, they all arrived in Seefra at different times and locations. Harper, in particular, arrived three years earlier with the remains of the android Rommie. He tried to repair her but failed, eventually building another android, Doyle, with some of Rommie's memories. Initially, he convinces her that she is human, but later her true identity is revealed by a rebel android. The reason for replacing Rommie with Doyle is Lexa Doig's pregnancy. Rommie was rebuilt by Doyle late in this season. Trance is also found, but she is weakened by her attempt to transport Andromeda and its crew to Seefra. She does not quite remember who she is and what she is supposed to do. Trance underwent a metamorphosis yet again; she is still golden-skinned but appears younger, and her personality resembles her first purple incarnation. Andromeda itself is transported to Seefra as well, but it has no power and no way to restore it. Trance partially recharges the ship's generators, but Andromeda still cannot move (apparently it needs 100 percent power) and its AI behavior is erratic.

The first half of the season deals with three main themes: Dylan's conflict with his crew, his attempts to restore Andromeda's power and the eventual discovery of the true role of Trance and the Seefra system. Rhade, Beka and Harper are all angry at Dylan for leaving them behind in the Battle of Arkology and for throwing them to Seefra without any way to get back to the Known Worlds. Their loyalty is strained several times, but seems finally reaffirmed after the intervention by Stranger, a Paradine sent by Dylan from an alternate future. Andromeda's power is eventually restored with ancient Vedran artifacts, but it is still unable to leave Seefra, it seems to be located in a "pocket universe" and the only way out is the Route of Ages. Although some characters come and leave through it, Dylan cannot use it. Seefra turns out to be Tarn-Vedra, the long-lost capital of the Commonwealth, but the Vedrans themselves left it long ago, disillusioned with humans. Seefra-1 is the original Tarn-Vedra and Seefra-2 to 9 are copies of it. Tarn-Vedra's original sun was somehow replaced by two artificial constructs, Methus-1 and Methus-2, but it's now damaged and emits deadly flares, which are the reason for Seefra's drought.

The Methus Diagram — a blueprint for the Seefra system, recovered with the help of the mysterious DJ Virgil Vox — also reveals the purpose of the eight extra planets. The Vedran sun will return someday, and destroy Seefra-2 through 9 to slow down and take its position. But because of the damage to Methus-2, this mechanism is not working, and the sun threatens to devastate the system completely.

As the second half of the season builds to major revelations and solutions. In the 100th episode of the series, the crew meets up with Peter, who they eventually deduce will become Drago Museveni, the progenitor of the Nietzschean race. He and Beka have a sexual tryst, after which he takes samples of Beka's DNA to mix with his own to create their children, applying bio-engineering and nanobot technology to these offspring to create the Nietzschean race. This makes Beka their Alpha Matriarch, and an instrumental part of the history of the Systems Commonwealth. Peter exits through the Route of Ages to an earlier time, so that the new race will have already existed for 16 generations when the first episode happens. The episode also sees Andromeda restored to full power. Trance remembers her identity when she meets Ione, the avatar of the Tarn-Vedra moon, and also she is the Tarn-Vedra sun. When she realizes this, her sun enters the Seefra system, and Dylan has to find a way to fix Methus-2 and evacuate eight doomed planets to Seefra-1.

Trance's "sisters" (who call themselves "the Nebula"), however, try to persuade her to join them. In their opinion the fate of Dylan, Seefra or the Known Worlds is irrelevant. Trance stubbornly refuses, and the Nebula imprisons her inside Methus-2, replacing her with Bad Trance (all Avatars of the Suns look alike). It takes some time for Dylan to realize the deception and rescue the real Trance. Dylan proceeds with the evacuation of the Seefra planets, although his plans are hindered by General Burma, a religious leader from Seefra-5. Burma is later revealed to be under the control of the Abyss. In a confrontation with Burma and Evil Trance, Dylan and Beka kill Burma, and Trance drives off her evil counterpart. In the series finale, the Vedran sun is back in place and people are safe on Seefra-1. Trance then contacts the Nebula — the Lambent Kith Nebula, the supreme council of the galaxies which includes fifty Avatars. Trance was once the oldest member of the Nebula, but disagreed with their views of organic life as something insignificant and left long ago. Together with Dylan, she appeals to the Nebula and its leader Maura, who plans to destroy the Abyss by expanding the All Forces Nullification Point until it consumes all galaxies. This incidentally will destroy everything alive in existence; only Seefra will survive. Maura refuses to reconsider their plans but allows Dylan and the Andromeda to return to the Known Worlds. When the Andromeda slipstreams to Tarazed, Dylan finds out that only four days have passed since the Battle of Arkology, and the Magog World ship is crippled but still operational. Rhade reunites with his wife (only to return to the Andromeda shortly).

Andromeda visits Earth (where Harper secretly plans to stay), but as soon as the ship arrives in the system, the planet is promptly destroyed by the Abyss. A huge Nietzschean fleet emerges from behind the debris, and Andromeda barely escapes. Dylan begins to suspect Maura's motives and soon realizes she is the avatar of the Abyss and that all of the Nebula were under its control. Maura had destroyed all Paradines (except Dylan). Trance has Dylan take Andromeda back to Seefra and the Abyss destroys Maura for her failure. At Seefra, Evil Trance returns and reveals herself to be the mysterious Virgil Vox, but Dylan can distinguish the real Trance from her counterpart and kills Vox.

After a massive battle with the Nietzscheans of the Drago-Kazov Pride, Dylan checks the Methus Diagram once again and discovers that Trance's sun is capable of destroying the Abyss. Andromeda returns to Seefra through the Route of Ages, followed by the Abyss. Trance manages to pull her sun closer and plunge it into the Abyss burning it and finally destroying it, as Dylan's battle is over. The Route of Ages transforms into a slipstream portal, allowing the Commonwealth fleet to return to Tarn-Vedra.

No. overall	No. in season	Title	Directed by	Written by	Original release date	Prod. code
89	1	"The Weight (Part One)"	Gordon Verheul	Bob Engels	September 24, 2004	501
Dylan has entered the Route of Ages and finds himself on a planet. He is met by a man called Flavin who welcomes him but it soon becomes clear the rest of the planet's inhabitants are wary of outsiders. Flavin tells him that Seefra-1 is one of nine identical planets and that occasionally new people arrive but leaving may be impossible and certainly nobody has left and come back. It later emerges that Dylan isn't the only member of Andromeda's crew on Seefra-1. Rhade is also there but he has been there much longer than Dylan and over that time he has grown bitter. Upon discovering the truth about planet Seefra-1 is Tarn-Vedra, his long-missing homeworld, Dylan must free its people and reunite his crew.
90	2	"The Weight (Part Two)"	Jorge Montesi	Naomi Janzen	October 1, 2004	502
Dylan and Rhade pick up a distress signal from Beka who is apparently on Seefra-9 so they set about acquiring a craft to get there, only to find her scheming with a trade mogul Jonah Darrega, who has claimed Andromeda for himself. The mogul tries to destroy Andromeda in the end, but Rhade sabotages his ship and Dylan realizes that the Core Creature is Trance in her sun form. Trance restores enough power to Andromeda for the ship to fire a counter-missile, but Beka is unhappy with Dylan leaving her in Seefra for what seemed like years and holds little loyalty to him anymore. Also, Trance regains her usual form but seems younger than when she went supernova at Arkology, but not as young as when they first met her. However, she only holds a vague re-collection of the crew and doesn't remember anything.
91	3	"Phear Phactor Phenom"	Richard Flower	Paul Barber & Larry Barber	October 8, 2004	503
The crew reunites with Harper and the mysterious 'Doyle' when they confront a geneticist bent on an idea of a Vedran re-birth. Harper is not happy to see his former boss, having adjusted to life on Seefra. In order to eliminate the tech ban that prevents her from realizing her goal, she plots to use fear to control the Seefra system. Soon Harper needs Dylan to help him out of this trouble.
92	4	"Decay of the Angel"	Jorge Montesi	Ashley Edward Miller & Zack Stentz	October 15, 2004	504
For all of her life, Doyle has been plagued by amnesia and nightmares. When Argent, a "revolutionary" android from the future arrives, Doyle discovers the truth about her life. It is discovered that Doyle is an android herself, created by Harper to hold Rommie's core programming when he was unable to rebuild her. Argent tries to entice Doyle to join him, but Doyle refuses and Harper destroys him and his men as well as their tesseract, but in doing so also destroys a possible way out of Seefra for the Andromeda crew.
93	5	"The Eschatology of Our Present"	Richard Flower	Paul Barber & Larry Barber	October 22, 2004	505
Dylan and Beka are aboard the Eureka Maru listening to Virgil Vox on the radio. They are somewhat surprised when he plays a song for Beka. She is offered a mysterious prize by Virgil Vox, Seefra's only DJ, and must confront the tech police leader, Ard Barton, who wants it for himself. With the guidance of Virgil Vox, Beka learns the truth about the Seefra system and locates the mysterious Methus Diagram, but is left with no clue as to its purpose.
94	6	"When Goes Around..."	Jorge Montesi	John Whelpley	October 29, 2004	506
Dylan and the crew encounter an officer of the original Commonwealth, who is trapped in a time loop. It is revealed that she was one of the scientists who pulled Tarn-Vedra into the Seefra system and she helps correct the mistake that causes Seefra to be a desert. Dylan attempts to save her, and decipher the code which restores Seefra to its proper alignment. When the time loop is broken, she leaves and it is unclear what happens to her, but on Seefra it finally rains.
95	7	"Attempting Screed"	David Winning	Paul Barber & Larry Barber	November 5, 2004	507
The return of Flavin sparks a conflict between two rival gangs over who gets his ship and the bounties within. Rhade and Harper play the two sides to make money off their enmity. Meanwhile, Flavin makes some rather cryptic comments before taking Dylan on a journey that is intended to teach him what it means to be a Paradine and his abilities.
96	8	"So Burn the Untamed Lands"	Jorge Montesi	Gillian Horvath	November 12, 2004	508
Harper discovers a crystal that can restore Andromeda to full power. In order to obtain some of the crystal, however, Rhade and Dylan must go undercover working for Cutter, the mine's owner, who uses slaves to extract it. The crew gets the crystal they need but are forced to use it as a bomb to destroy the mines as they free the slaves. Andromeda and Doyle argue over who controls the ship.
97	9	"What Will be Was Not"	Gordon Verheul	Naomi Janzen	November 19, 2004	509
Harper and Rhade are arguing over the latter's bar bill; Beka and Doyle get involved and soon they have set off a full-scale bar fight. As it breaks up Rhade states that they all know who is really to blame for their situation. He means Dylan but Trance enters at that moment and assumes they mean her. Believing she isn't wanted to leave and heads down into the tunnels of Seefra-1. Here she meets Orland, a sweeper responsible for keeping the tunnels clean and safe, who mistakes her for a princess. He has also discovered ancient Vedran technology including a weapon that turns its targets into stone. Dylan and Doyle head down to the tunnels, looking for Trance. He leads them to a Vedran chamber containing portals that can be used to tesseract to the other eight Seefra planets.
98	10	"The Test"	Brad Turner	Scott Frost	January 7, 2005	510
After an old man named Prysis is slain, a mysterious man, first appears as a ball of energy, arrives through the Route of Ages to find his killer. Beka, Rhade and Harper are the main suspects, and Dylan strikes a deal: the stranger will return Andromeda and its crew to the known worlds, in exchange for Dylan executing Prysis' murderer. In the end, Dylan is killed, but it is revealed that the stranger and Prysis are the same people after Dylan revives. Dylan realizes that the Stranger is a Paradine sent from the future to bring the crew back together as they used to be and he leaves behind a cube that has the potential to repower Andromeda.
99	11	"Through a Glass Darkly"	Jorge Montesi	Ashley Edward Miller & Zack Stentz	January 14, 2005	511
The crew helps rebels on Seefra-5 who are battling a local warlord. In order to help them escape, Harper attempts to rebuild the quantum teleporter with assistance from his old friend Höhne, a Perseid scientist thought to have been dead for years. While doing this he establishes that there is still a link to 300 years ago, before the fall of the Commonwealth. Dylan plans to use the device to both save his crew and the Commonwealth. This ultimately causes power to go out all across the planets and is restored when Höhne sacrifices himself to shut down the teleporter. The lack of power allows the rebels led by Rhade to defeat the warlord who flees the planet, but after he targets Andromeda, Dylan destroys his ship. Harper mourns his friend's death and discovers a message from him.
100	12	"Pride Before the Fall"	David Winning	Bob Engels	January 21, 2005	512
Dylan is in the process of acquiring a power source that could get Andromeda fully operational; then quake causes him to be trapped. He calls for help but Andromeda and Doyle can't agree on a plan and Beka is too busy with Peter, her new boyfriend. Luckily Rhade manages to rescue him and the power source. Peter, places the entire crew in danger with a series of tests, culminating in a startling discovery that may help the crew – if they can escape the Seefra system. Peter is defeated by Dylan while Andromeda, now restored to full power, saves Beka. Peter leaves through the Route of Ages and Dylan reveals the startling truth. Peter was Drago Museveni, the progenitor of the Nietzschean race. He used Beka's DNA to create the Nietzscheans which makes her their Alpha Matriarch. If the Andromeda ever returns to the Known World, this will give them an advantage over the Nietzscheans.
101	13	"Moonlight Becomes You"	Jorge Montesi	Lu Abbott & Stacey Berman-Woodward	January 28, 2005	513
Harper, Doyle, Beka and Rhade are searching the tunnels for what they believe to be Vedran's treasure. They find a door, which closes after Beka and Rhade enter; according to legend if they pass a test they will be rewarded. If they fail only madness awaits. Harper and Doyle try to open the door again but this only results in Doyle being severely damaged. Meanwhile back on Andromeda, Trance says she feels drawn to Seefra-2, suddenly she transports to the planet. Searching for answers, Trance encounters a man claiming to be a sun god. The man turns out to be Ione, the Avatar of Tarn Vedra's moon, and his and her meeting causes Trance's sun, the original Vedran star, to return to the Seefra system. Trance and Ione rescue Beka and Rhade, but he and Trance can never be together so he tesseracts away.
102	14	"Past is Prolix"	David Winning	Paul Barber & Larry Barber	February 4, 2005	514
Harper discovers an ancient Vedran program that will destroy eight of the nine planets in the system when activated. Dylan determines that it will be necessary to evacuate those planets but he will have other problems to deal with first. Trance's sun arrives via the Route of Ages as part of a plan to recreate Tarn Vedra. Trance faints and develops a fever that could ultimately destroy Andromeda. While this is going on the crystals that control the teleportation system linking the planets are stolen. Dylan and Orlund, the crystal's protector, try to retrieve them but it won't be easy as they are now in the possession of a dangerous thug who has no intention of returning them. If that weren't enough Rhade is refusing to do anything that could endanger Beka since he learns she is destined to be the matriarch of all Nietzscheans.
103	15	"The Opposites of Attraction"	Jorge Montesi	Gillian Horvath	February 11, 2005	515
Harper builds a giant parabolic reflector in an attempt to slow down the Tarn-Vedran sun and delay its collision with Seefra's planets, while a mysterious entity threatens Andromeda and its crew. It is revealed that the entity is the Avatar of the black hole, Andromeda had been stuck in for 300 years and that she and Dylan had a relationship while he was stuck which he doesn't remember. Ultimately Dylan is forced to trap her in a data file while Harper's reflector fails to work.
104	16	"Saving Light from a Black Sun"	Peter DeLuise	John Kirk	February 18, 2005	516
Methus-2, the Seefra system's second artificial sun, is due to turn off for an hour. Harper believes he has a way to extend that time to three hours. During this time, the others plan to head into the sun's core in order to repair it and fix the braking system that is supposed to guide Trance's sun into position. If successful they will save the system from Trance's approaching sun. Once inside they find themselves in a maze of corridors and soon they are all separated. If that weren't enough they aren't alone; Trance's 'sister' is also there and her sole concern is persuading Trance to re-join the nebula; even if that means endangering her friends. The crew succeeds in fixing the sun and getting the fuel, but Trance is replaced by her doppelgänger.
105	17	"Totaled Recall"	Martin Wood	Gordon Michael Woolvett	April 8, 2005	517
Dylan is gravely wounded in a lab accident but wakes up in the bar with Harper telling bad jokes. He is confronted by a man who is wielding Dylan's force-lances and delivers a cryptic message. After a quick fight with Dylan, the man drops to the floor without apparent cause but returns in the guise of Rhade to catch Dylan off guard, killing him swiftly. Dylan awakens on med-deck but finds that he has returned just after the accident and does not remember Trance. Dylan finds himself traveling through a series of alternate realities.
106	18	"Quantum Tractate Delirium"	Peter DeLuise	Paul Barber & Larry Barber	April 15, 2005	518
While Beka and Rhade are busy evacuating the inhabitants of Seefra-9 to Seefra-1, Dylan and Doyle test the new GFG lens, which allows them access to slipstream. However, Andromeda does not enter the slipstream event due to a logic override, assuming that slipstream has never worked in the Seefra system before. Rommie is rebuilt by Doyle for Dylan to override Andromeda's logic systems. Rommie turns on the crew after she is rebuilt.
107	19	"One More Day's Light"	Martin Wood	Al Septien & Turi Meyer	April 22, 2005	519
Dylan deals with the residents of Seefra-1 who are unhappy with the number of refugees arriving on their planet. With Trance's sun working its way through the Seefra system it is time for Seefra-5 to be evacuated. Rhade and Harper are there working to get the Vedran tesseract machine working but there are more than just technological problems. The planet is led by an extreme technophobe who believes the planetary instabilities are an illusion created by those wanting to lure them into slavery on Seefra-1. Rhade is captured while trying to help the leader's sister, who had tried to organize an evacuation. Above Seefra-5, Beka is surprised when she intercepts a ship containing three Nietzscheans, a race, apart from Rhade, unknown in the system. They appear to be impressed to learn that she is their Matriarch. Meanwhile, Trance has gone missing. They noted that she has behaved differently since the events on Methus-2.
108	20	"Chaos and the Stillness of It"	Martin Wood	Naomi Janzen	April 29, 2005	520
General Burma, Seefra-5's warlord, has taken Harper to Seefra-1. He then contacts Dylan and tells him he will kill Harper if his demands aren't met. Dylan makes it clear there will be no deal. He then heads to Methus-2 with Rhade hoping to confirm that Trance Gemini aboard the Andromeda isn't their old friend. This leaves Beka, Rommie and Doyle to try to locate Harper. They are looking in the wrong place though; Harper is no longer on Seefra-1; Burma forced him to take him and his men to Andromeda. Here we learn he is in league with an old enemy who the crew discovers is the Abyss. Dylan and Rhade succeed in rescuing Trance who defeats her evil counterpart and drives her away while Dylan and Beka manage to kill Burma.
109	21	"The Heart of the Journey (Part One)"	Jorge Montesi	Paul Barber & Larry Barber	May 6, 2005	521
Dylan and his crew deal with the survivors on Seefra-1 promising them that it will soon become like Tarn-Vedra once was. Harper works on getting the "low-tech" mechanism inside the planet to work properly, while Trance explores her new powers resulting from the re-establishment of her sun. She introduces Dylan to the group that her impersonator worked for, "the Nebula", a group of stars controlling all the galaxies, also an enemy of the Abyss. Trance's 'family' of sun avatars decides to destroy the Abyss – by expanding the All Forces Nullification Point until it consumes the Abyss and the three galaxies that make up the Known Worlds. Dylan also receives a message from Flavin who reveals that all of the Paradines have been killed and Dylan is the only one left. With the help of the leader of Trance's family, Maura, Andromeda finally returns to the Known Worlds only to discover that it has only been four days since they left. They also learn that the Nietzscheans are planning an attack on Tarazed and the World ship wasn't destroyed at Arkology as believed, just badly crippled. Andromeda heads to Earth where Harper secretly plans to stay, but the planet is destroyed by the Nietzscheans guided by the Abyss.
110	22	"The Heart of the Journey (Part Two)"	Jorge Montesi	Bob Engels	May 13, 2005	522
The final battle to save the New Systems Commonwealth begins as the Nietzscheans destroy Earth and attack Tarazed. Rhade chooses to stay on Tarazed with his family while the rest of the crew choose to remain behind on Andromeda to fight despite Maura offering them a chance to return to Seefra through the Route of Ages which the Avatars have no intention of destroying. Andromeda manages to hold its own, but is no match for the fleet. Maura confronts Dylan and attacks him, revealing herself to be an Avatar of the Abyss and the one that murdered the Paradines. Trance intervenes and orders Dylan to take the ship through the Route of Ages to Seefra. Dylan complies and the Abyss destroys Maura for failing it. At Seefra, Dylan realizes that the Methus Diagram is designed to show how to destroy the Abyss: burn it with Trance's sun. However, another Trance tesseracts in and demands they kill the first Trance, revealing that one of them is an imposter. After a brief hesitation, Dylan shoots the first Trance as the second Trance was crying and the Abyss has no emotions. The first Trance reveals herself to be the mysterious Virgil Vox and taunts the crew before Dylan kills her. The crew pilot Andromeda into the Route of Ages with Trance's sun being pulled along by her. The Abyss starts to emerge from the portal as they approach, but Andromeda is able to fly through it, pulling the sun in with it. Andromeda makes it out safely while the Abyss is destroyed. As the crew celebrates, the Route of Ages turns into a slipstream portal, reuniting Tarn-Vedra with the Known Worlds. A Commonwealth fleet arrives, Rhade among them, and reveals that the battle is over and his family is fine. As the rest of the crew leave to their tasks, Dylan celebrates the victory and the fact that after so long, he is home.
