= Gordon Michael Woolvett =

Canadian actor (b. 1970)

- Born: 1970 (age 55–56); Hamilton, Ontario, Canada
- Occupation: Actor
- Years active: 1984–present
- Spouse: Michele Morand (m. 2000)
- Children: 3
- Relatives: Jaimz Woolvett (brother)
- Website: www.gordonwoolvett.com

Gordon Michael Woolvett (born 1970) is a Canadian actor from Hamilton, Ontario.

== Career ==
Woolvett's most enduring role was as Seamus Zelazny Harper on the television series Andromeda (2000–2005). Prior to Andromeda he starred in another science fiction television series, Deepwater Black (known as Mission Genesis in the US). He was also credited as playing Mitch in the "Pariah" episode of the short-lived 1980s science-fiction/action series Captain Power and the Soldiers of the Future. He was in two episodes of Psi Factor: Chronicles of the Paranormal.

Woolvett was one of the first program jockeys for YTV's The Zone (then called The After-School Zone) and the original main host for a program called Video & Arcade Top 10 which also aired on YTV. He acted in the 1999 made-for-TV film Ultimate Deception with Yasmine Bleeth. He also appeared on the Canadian television series The Guard, which aired from 2008 to 2009 on Global Television Network.

In 1992, Woolvett was nominated for the Gemini Award for Best Performance by a Supporting Actor for his role in Princes in Exile (1990). He directed the documentary Around the World in 80 Anthems, which won Best Documentary at the seventh International Film Festival Manhattan in 2017.

In 2020, Woolvett began teaching acting, improv, scene study, movie making, screenwriting and performance to young actors aged 9–18 on the Outschool homeschooling platform.

== Personal life ==
Woolvett was born in 1970 in Hamilton, Ontario, Canada. He married Michele Morand on January 15, 2000. His brother is actor Jaimz Woolvett. He has three children.

== Filmography ==
=== Film ===
Year	Title	Role	Notes
1985	Joshua Now and Then	Teddy Shapiro	
1989	The Journey Home		
1990	Princes in Exile	Louis	
1992	Bordertown Café	Jimmy	
1995	Rude	Ricky	
1996	The Legend of Gator Face	Chip	
1998	Shadow Builder	Larry Eggers	
1998	Clutch	Spit	
1998	Bride of Chucky	David Collins	
2000	The Highwayman	Walter	
2006	Everything's Gone Green	Spike	
2014	Down Here	Coach Randall	

=== Television ===
Year	Title	Role	Notes
1984	The Edison Twins	Dave	"Diamonds"
1986	Act of Vengeance	Bobby	TV film
1986	9B	Kevin	TV film
1987	Airwaves	Greg	"Happy 16th", "A Second Look"
1987	Captain Power and the Soldiers of the Future	Mitch	"Pariah"
1988	Learning the Ropes	Brad	Recurring role
1988	My Secret Identity	Tim	"It Only Hurts for a Little While"
1989	T. and T.	Steve	"Thicker Than Water"
1990	The Campbells	Henry Clay	"A Proposal of Marriage"
1990	The World's Oldest Living Bridesmaid	Rodney	TV film
1992	E.N.G.	Nick	"To Kill with Kindness"
1992	Road to Avonlea	Rat	"When She Was Bad, She Was Horrid: Part 2"
1992	Maniac Mansion	John Cody	"Ike's New Buddy"
1993	Family Pictures	Soletski	TV film
1993	X-Rated	Tony Foster	TV film (series pilot)
1993	Wild Side Show	Host	Season 2 "13 episodes"
1994	The Mighty Jungle	Peter	"Allison's Restaurant"
1994	Side Effects	Chris Stokes	"House of Caduceus"
1994	Forever Knight	Kyle	"Can't Run, Can't Hide"
1995	Mysterious Island	Herbert Pencroft	Main role
1995	Heritage Minutes	Young	"The Paris Crew"
1996	Sliders	Judge	"The Young and the Relentless"
1996	Gone in a Heartbeat	Paul Hackett	TV film
1997	F/X: The Series	Jules	"Bad Influence"
1997	Mission Genesis	Reb Andersen	Main role
1997	Promise the Moon	Little Jay	TV film
1997	Peacekeepers	Pte. Daryl Huddy	TV film
1998	Psi Factor	Gary	"The Labyrinth"
1998	My Date with the President's Daughter	Clyde	TV film
1999	Ultimate Deception	Andy McThomas	TV film
2000	The 7th Portal	Thunderer / Peter Littlecloud (voice)	TV series
2000–2005	Andromeda	Seamus Harper	Main role
2003	Shattered City: The Halifax Explosion	Sergeant Sam Barlow	TV miniseries
2003	The Twilight Zone	Gordon	"Cold Fusion"
2007	Secrets of an Undercover Wife	Clayton	TV film
2007	Blood Ties	Steve Jeffries	"Gifted"
2008–09	The Guard	Barry Winter	Main role
2014	Supernatural	Ezra	"King of the Damned"
2015	Girlfriends' Guide to Divorce	Ferret Guy	"Rule #32"
2017	iZombie	James Weckler	"Spanking the Zombie", "Dirt Nap Time", "Conspiracy Weary"
2018	The Arrangement	Director (Frankie)	"Truth"
2023	Epic Career Quest	King Brady	1 episode
