= Keith Hamilton Cobb =

American actor (born 1962)

- Born: January 28, 1962 (age 64); North Tarrytown, New York, U.S.
- Occupation: Actor
- Years active: 1989–present

Keith Hamilton Cobb (born January 28, 1962) is an American actor.

== Career ==
He is best known for his roles as the ruthless Nietzschean mercenary Tyr Anasazi in the science-fiction series Gene Roddenberry's Andromeda from 2000 to 2005 and as Noah Keefer on All My Children from 1994 to 1996.

Cobb was born in North Tarrytown, New York; he graduated from New York University's Tisch School of the Arts in 1987. A classically trained actor, he appeared in a number of Shakespearean productions in the New York area before breaking into television in the mid 1990s. One of his first movies was the 1995 film Eyes Beyond Seeing in which he plays a mental patient who claims to be Jesus Christ.

In 1996, Cobb was named on People magazine's annual list of the "50 most beautiful people".

In 1999, Cobb was in two episodes of the Beastmaster television series, portraying a character very similar to his character from Andromeda.

He left the Andromeda TV series at the start of the fourth season, citing dissatisfaction over the development of his character and went back to stage productions.

Cobb's 2015 play American Moor explores the experiences of Black actors performing texts as written and directed by white writers and directors. The play garnered great academic acclaim. The play debuted Off-Broadway at the Cherry Lane Theatre in August 2019.

He continues to act in theater productions, including roles as Oberon and Duke Theseus in A Midsummer Night's Dream in New York's Geva Theater Center, and the bigoted Juror #10 in Twelve Angry Men at Briggs Opera House in White River Junction, Vermont.

== Filmography ==
=== Film ===
Keith Hamilton Cobb film credits
Year	Title	Role	Notes	Ref.
1989	Cold Light of Day	Billy	Uncredited	
1989	The American Experience	Felix	Documentary; flashback sequence	
1990	Astonished	Simon		
1995	Eyes Beyond Seeing	Jesus		

=== Television ===
Keith Hamilton Cobb television credits
Year	Title	Role	Notes	Ref.
1995	The Fresh Prince of Bel-Air	Royce #1	Episode: "As the Will Turns"	
1995–1996	All My Children	Noah Keefer	22 episodes	
1997	Boston Common	Lucas	Episode: "To Bare Is Human"	
1999	Total Recall 2070	Dilah	unknown episodes	
1999	Suddenly Susan	Dr. Michael Karpe	Episode: "Vicki Moves In"	
1999–2000	BeastMaster	Akili / Akili's Father	Episodes: "Obsession", "Valhalla"	
2000–2004	Andromeda	Tyr Anasazi	Main role (seasons 1–4), 68 episodes	
2003	One on One	Clay	Episode: "I Know What You Did Last Thursday"	
2003	The Twilight Zone	Commander Skyles	Episode: "Cold Fusion"	
2003–2005	The Young and the Restless	Damon Porter	139 episodes	
2006	Noah's Arc	Quincy	Recurring role, 5 episodes	
2007	CSI: Miami	Oscar's Lawyer	Episode: "Inside Out"	
2022	Law & Order	Judge Andrew Morton	Episode: "Free Speech"	

== Awards and nominations ==
In 1995 Cobb won the Soap Opera Digest Award - Outstanding Male Newcomer for his role of Noah Keefer on All My Children and in 1996 won the Soap Opera Digest Award - Hottest Soap Couple for his work on All My Children (shared with Sydney Penny).
