= Lexa Doig =

Canadian actress

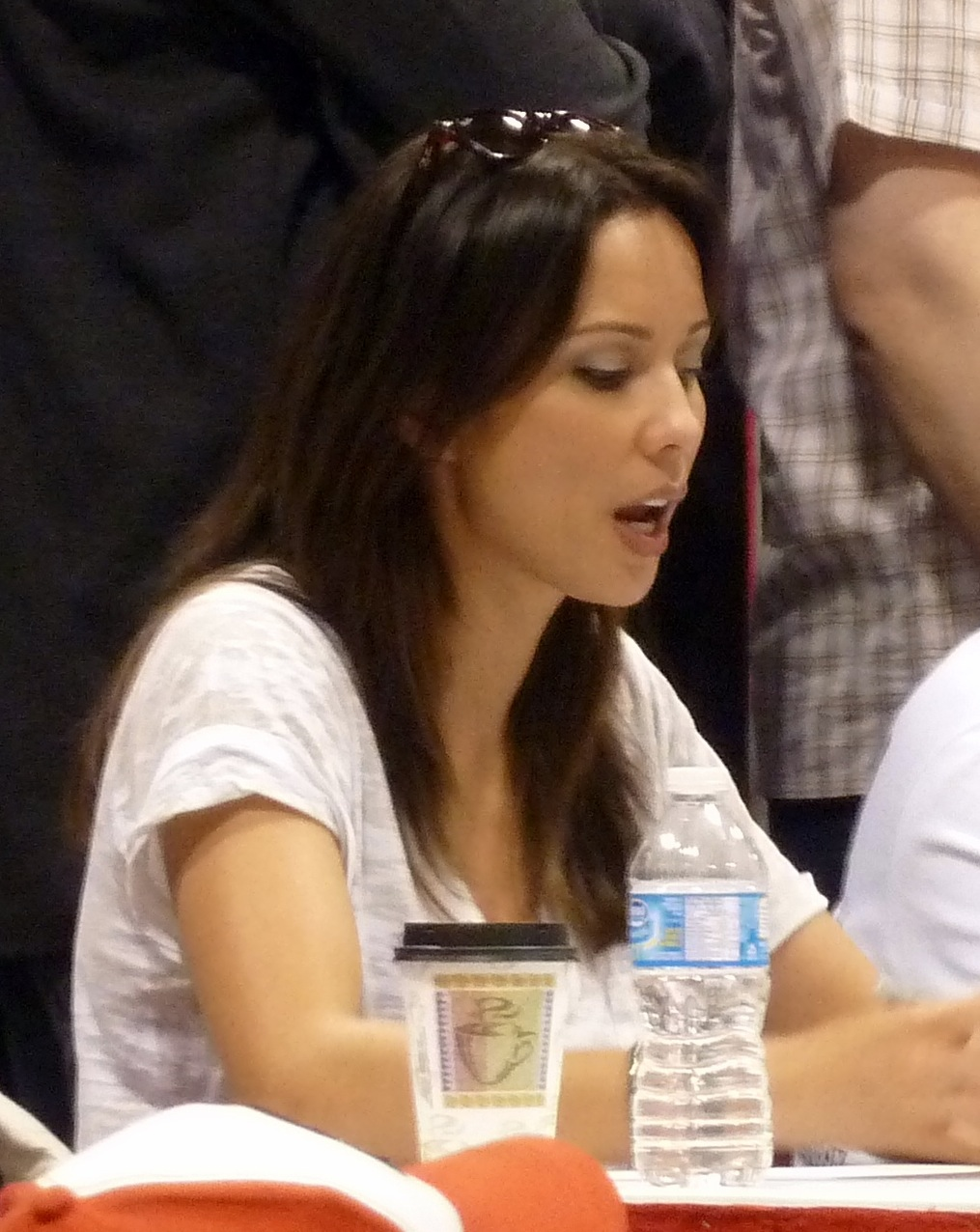
- Lexa Doig at Fan Expo 2011 in Toronto
- Born: Alexandra Lecciones Doig; June 8, 1973 (age 53); Toronto, Ontario, Canada
- Occupation: Actress
- Years active: 1993–present
- Spouse: Michael Shanks (m. 2003)
- Children: 2

Alexandra Lecciones Doig (born June 8, 1973) is a Canadian actress. She played the title role in the science fiction television series Andromeda (2000–2005). She also played the lead female role of Rowan in the science fiction-action horror film Jason X (2001), the tenth installment of the Friday the 13th film series. From 2015 to 2022, Doig appeared in the Aurora Teagarden mystery television film series on the Hallmark Mystery channel.

== Early life ==
Doig was born and grew up in Toronto, Ontario. Her deceased father was of Scottish descent and her mother is a native of City of Dumaguete, Philippines.

As a child, Doig studied rhythmic gymnastics, and as a teenager studied American Sign Language. She developed a strong interest in acting and was inspired to become an actor at age nine after she watched a theatre production of Porgy and Bess.

== Career ==
=== Early modelling ===
While completing secondary education at Don Mills Collegiate Institute, she enrolled in a vocational modelling program. There, at age 16, she was immediately offered representation by a talent agent and booked in various modelling projects. She chose to drop out from her final year in high school to pursue an acting career.

The initial media exposure led to her co-hosting the Canadian game show Video & Arcade Top 10. While auditioning for television and film roles, she worked on theatre productions of Romeo and Juliet and Arsenic and Old Lace.

=== Acting ===
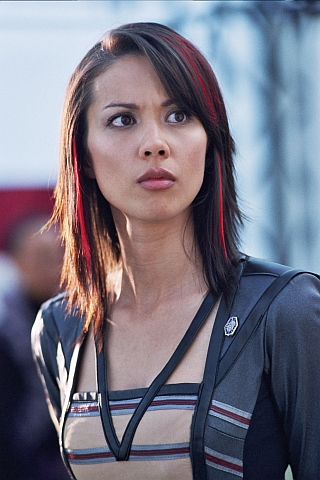
Doig as Rommie from Andromeda in 2004

Her first television acting role was as "Second Girl" on The Hidden Room in 1993. Her first recurring role was in the TV series TekWar in 1994 where she portrayed the role of Cowgirl. Her first movie role was in Jungleground (1995). Doig got her first big break with a starring role in the movie No Alibi in 2000. She also landed the title role in Gene Roddenberry's sci-fi TV series Andromeda where, from 2000 to 2005, she portrayed the Andromeda Ascendant ship's computer in three personas — as the ship's powerful AI (artificial intelligence) on the ship's screen, as the AI's hologram, and as Rommie, the android avatar of the AI.

In 2001, she played the female lead role of "Dr. Rowan LaFontaine" in the horror film Jason X, the tenth instalment of the Friday the 13th film series. In a recurring role as Dr. Carolyn Lam, Doig appeared in 11 episodes of the ninth and tenth seasons of Stargate SG-1 between 2005 and 2007. In 2010, Doig appeared in six episodes in the remake of V as the alien physician Dr. Leah Pearlman. In 2012, she began playing the role of Liber8 terrorist Sonya Valentine in the Canadian science fiction TV series Continuum.

In 2017, Doig began playing the recurring role of Talia al Ghul in the fifth season of Arrow. The same year she began portraying DeAnn Anderson, one of the main roles in the E! television series The Arrangement. In 2019, Doig joined the cast of the Netflix television series Virgin River, based on the Virgin River series of novels by Robyn Carr, playing Paige Lassiter.

== Personal life ==
Doig dated actor Michael Shanks after they met on the set of Andromeda, where the former starred and the latter guest-starred in the 2001 episode "Star Crossed". They married on August 2, 2003, and they worked together again in the 2003 episode "Day of Judgment, Day of Wrath" of the same TV series. The couple were castmates in the final two seasons of Stargate SG-1. They worked together in the action thriller Tactical Force (2011), in which Doig portrayed an LAPD SWAT officer and Shanks played the role of a Russian mob leader. They worked together on the Netflix Original series Virgin River (2019). They have two children, a son and a daughter, in addition to Shanks' child from a previous relationship.

Doig and Shanks are actively involved as charity fundraising partners for the Multiple Sclerosis Society of Canada.

== Filmography ==
=== Film ===
Year	Title	Role	Notes
1995	Jungleground	Spider	
1999	Teen Sorcery	Mercedes	Direct-to-video film
2000	No Alibi	Camille	
2001	Jason X	Rowan LaFontaine	
2011	Tactical Force	Jannard	

=== Television ===
Year	Title	Role	Notes
1993	The Hidden Room	Second Girl	Episode: "Marion & Jean"
1994	TekWar	Cowgirl	Television film
1994	TekWar: TekLords	Cowgirl	Television film
1994–1996	TekWar	Cowgirl	Recurring role (5 episodes)
1996	Taking the Falls	Netta	Episode: "From Russia with Love"
1996	F/X: The Series	Reporter	Episode: "French Kiss"
1996	Flash Gordon	Dale Arden	Main voice role
1996	Ready or Not	Receptionist	Episode: "Glamour Girl"
1997	While My Pretty One Sleeps	Tse Tse	Television film
1999	CI5: The New Professionals	Tina Backus	Main role
1999–2000	Traders	M.J. Sullivan	Recurring role (season 5), 5 episodes
2000	Code Name Phoenix	Conchita Flores	Television film
2000	Earth: Final Conflict	Joan Price	Episode: Abduction
2001	The Tracker	Kim Chang	Television film
2002	The Chris Isaak Show	Detective Lucy Ramirez	Episode: "Home of the Brave"
2004	Human Cargo	Rachel Sanders	Television miniseries
2005	The 4400	Wendy Paulson	4 episodes
2005	Killer Instinct	Hospital Doctor	Episode: "Forget Me Not"
2000–2005	Andromeda	Andromeda Ascendant / Rommie	Main role
2005–2007	Stargate SG-1	Dr. Carolyn Lam	Recurring role (seasons 9–10), 11 episodes
2007	Second Sight	Jenny Morris	Television film
2007–2008	Eureka	Dr. Anne Young	Episodes: "Maneater", "Best in Faux"
2008	Ba'al: The Storm God	Pena	Television film
2009	Fireball	Ava	Television film
2009	Supernatural	Risa	Episode: "The End"
2010	V	Dr. Leah Pearlman	Recurring role (season 1), 6 episodes
2010–2011	Smallville	Dr. Christina Lamell	Episodes: "Harvest", "Scion" (scenes deleted)
2011	Health Nutz	Ivonka	Episode: "Good News, Bad News"
2013	Primeval: New World	Dr. Mara Fridkin	Episodes: "The Sound of Thunder, Parts 1 & 2"
2012–2015	Continuum	Sonya Valentine	Main role (seasons 1–3)
2012–2014	Arctic Air	Petra Hossa	Recurring role, 9 episodes Nominated – Leo Award for Best Guest Performance by a Female in a Dramatic Series
2014	Saving Hope	Dr. Selina Quintos	3 episodes
2015	A Bone to Pick: An Aurora Teagarden Mystery	Sally Allison	Television film
2015	Real Murders: An Aurora Teagarden Mystery	Sally Allison	Television film
2016	Three Bedrooms, One Corpse: An Aurora Teagarden Mystery	Sally Allison	Television film
2016	The Julius House: An Aurora Teagarden Mystery	Sally Allison	Television film Nominated – Leo Award for Best Supporting Performance by a Female in a Television Movie
2017–2020	Arrow	Talia al Ghul	Recurring role (seasons 5, 7–8)
2017–2018	The Arrangement	Deann Anderson	Main role
2017	Dead Over Heels: An Aurora Teagarden Mystery	Sally Allison	Television film
2017	A Bundle of Trouble: An Aurora Teagarden Mystery	Sally Allison	Television film
2018	Reap What You Sew: An Aurora Teagarden Mystery	Sally Allison	Television film
2018	Aurora Teagarden Mysteries: The Disappearing Game	Sally Allison	Television film
2019	Aurora Teagarden Mysteries: A Game of Cat and Mouse	Sally Allison	Television film
2019	Aurora Teagarden Mysteries: An Inhertiance to Die For	Sally Allison	Television film
2019	Aurora Teagarden Mysteries: A Very Foul Play	Sally Allison	Television film
2019–2023	Virgin River	Paige Lassiter	Recurring role
2020	Aurora Teagarden Mysteries: Heist and Seek	Sally Allison	Television film
2020	Aurora Teagarden Mysteries: Reunited and it Feels So Deadly	Sally Allison	Television film
2021	Aurora Teagarden Mysteries: How to Con A Con	Sally Allison	Television film
2021	Aurora Teagarden Mysteries: Til Death Do Us Part	Sally Allison	Television film
2021	Chucky	Bree Wheeler	Recurring role (season 1)
2022	Aurora Teagarden Mysteries: Haunted By Murder	Sally Allison	Television film
2023	Goosebumps	Sarah	Recurring role
