= David Hemblen =

British–Canadian actor (1941–2020)

- Born: 16 September 1941; London, England, UK
- Died: 16 November 2020 (aged 79); Toronto, Ontario, Canada
- Occupation: Actor
- Years active: 1974–2007

David Hemblen (16 September 1941 – 16 November 2020) was an English–Canadian actor who frequently worked in Canadian film, television and theatre. He was born in London, England, and grew up in Toronto, Ontario. He is known for his role as George in La Femme Nikita, Customs inspector in Atom Egoyan's Exotica, Lord Dread/Lyman Taggert in Captain Power and the Soldiers of the Future, Detective Dick Hargrove in T. and T. and as Inspector Winterguild in TekWar. He is also known for his role as Johnathan Doors in Earth: Final Conflict and for voicing the character of Magneto in the X-Men animated series from 1992 to 1997.

== Early life and education ==
Born in London, England, Hemblen grew up in Toronto, Ontario, where he pursued a classical education before turning to theatre. He received an M.A. in English and was working towards a Ph.D. in medieval studies when he was spotted during a rehearsal of a university production by Clifford Williams of the Royal Shakespeare Company. Hemblen was offered a season at Toronto's Royal Alexandra Theatre. In the 1960s, Hemblen was a political activist and member of the Young Socialists.

== Career ==
Hemblen began his career in theatre in the 1960s. His stage career includes more than 70 productions as actor/director at major Canadian theatres, including the Stratford Festival and four seasons at the renowned Shaw Festival in Niagara-on-the-Lake. For his portrayal of Dr. Astrov in Toronto's Tarragon Theater production of Uncle Vanya, Hemblen received a Dora nomination for Best Leading Actor.

=== Film and television ===
Hemblen was a mainstay on the television series Earth: Final Conflict, playing Jonathan Doors, a role he is best known for. He appeared in the first two seasons as a main character and remained in the third season as a recurring character until being killed off in season four. He played recurring roles in A Nero Wolfe Mystery (Lewis Hewitt) and La Femme Nikita (George). He voiced Magneto on the popular show X-Men: The Animated Series, the Night Master on Yin Yang Yo!, the Vaultkeeper in Tales from the Cryptkeeper, Lord Dread/Lyman Taggart on Captain Power and the Soldiers of the Future, and Asmodeus Poisonteeth in Redwall.

Hemblen played a ruthless henchman Jones in Short Circuit 2 (1988), Reverend Buckley in Where the Spirit Lives (1989), and appeared as Christopher Newport in Pocahontas: The Legend (1999). He has also been featured in several Atom Egoyan films, such as Speaking Parts, The Sweet Hereafter (1997), Where the Truth Lies (2005), and Family Viewing (1987), for which he was nominated for a Genie Award.

In 1975, he starred in the children's television serial The Adventures of Timothy Pilgrim.

== Personal life and death ==
Hemblen lived most of the year in Toronto and made an annual winter visit to his second home in the south of France. He had one daughter, Kate, who is also an actress.

Hemblen died at the age of 79 on November 16, 2020.

== Filmography ==
=== Film ===
| Year | Title | Role | Notes |
|---|---|---|---|
| 1987 | Family Viewing | Stan | |
| 1988 | Short Circuit 2 | Jones | |
| 1988 | Norman's Awesome Experience | Septimus Fabius | |
| 1989 | Speaking Parts | Producer | |
| 1989 | Where the Spirit Lives | Reverend Buckley | |
| 1989 | Straight Line | Detective Hargrove | |
| 1991 | The Adjuster | Bert | |
| 1993 | A Man in Uniform | Father | |
| 1993 | M. Butterfly | Intelligence Officer #1 | |
| 1994 | Brainscan | Dr. Fromberg | |
| 1994 | Exotica | Customs Inspector | |
| 1994 | Mesmer | Dr. Ingehousz | |
| 1994 | Replikator | Police Chief | |
| 1995 | Tommy Boy | Archer | |
| 1995 | Pocahontas: The Legend | Christopher Newport | |
| 1995 | Iron Eagle on the Attack | Soviet Interrogator | |
| 1995 | The Champagne Safari | Charles Bedaux | Voice |
| 1996 | Hollow Point | Oleg Krezinsky | |
| 1996 | Fly Away Home | Dr. Killian | |
| 1996 | Maximum Risk | Dmitri Kirov | |
| 1997 | Booty Call | Dr. Blade | |
| 1997 | The Sweet Hereafter | Abbott | |
| 2001 | Rollerball | Serokin | |
| 2005 | Where the Truth Lies | NY Hotel Concierge | |

=== Television ===
| Year | Title | Role | Notes |
|---|---|---|---|
| 1975 | The Adventures of Timothy Pilgrim | Zachariah | 10 episodes |
| 1985 | Vista: The New Magicians | Narrator | Television film |
| 1986 | Hot Shots | Sebastian | Episode: "To Bee or Not to Bee" |
| 1986 | Night Heat | Braden Dean | Episode: "Another Country" |
| 1986 | Adderly | Mikhail Astrov | Episode: "The Dancing Lesson" |
| 1986 | The Campbells | Major George Henry Stevens | Episode: "A Real Lady" |
| 1987 | Basements | Mr. Hudd | Television film |
| 1987–1988 | Captain Power and the Soldiers of the Future | Lord Dread / Lyman Taggert | 22 episodes |
| 1987, 1992 | Street Legal | Curt MacDonald / Benton | 2 episodes |
| 1988 | Alfred Hitchcock Presents | Andrew Walker | Episode: "Murder Party" |
| 1988 | The Twilight Zone | Cutler | Episode: "20/20 Vision" |
| 1988–1990 | T. and T. | Detective Dick Hargrove | 26 episodes |
| 1990 | In Defense of a Married Man | Colin Barrie | Television film |
| 1990 | Counterstrike | Milos Janzan | Episode: "Art for Art's Sake" (S1.E4) |
| 1991 | Captain Power: The Beginning | Lord Dread | Television film |
| 1991 | Heritage Minutes | James Macleod | Episode: "Sitting Bull" |
| 1991 | Tropical Heat | Krieger | Episode: "Death's a Beach" |
| 1991 | Le peloton d'exécution | Sgt. Mortlake | Television film |
| 1992 | Counterstrike | Klaus Reichmann | Episode: "Cyborg" (S3.E9) |
| 1992 | Scales of Justice | Samuel Grange | Episode "Regina v Nelles" |
| 1992–1997 | X-Men: The Animated Series | Magneto, Various voices | 29 episodes |
| 1993 | Gross Misconduct: The Life of Brian Spencer | Munro | Television film |
| 1993 | Matrix | Shamus Cobb | Episode: "To Err is Human" |
| 1994–1994 | Tales from the Cryptkeeper | Various voices | 9 episodes |
| 1993 | Lifeline to Victory | Oldbest | Television film |
| 1994 | TekWar | Insp. Winterguild | Television film |
| 1994 | TekLords | Insp. Winterguild | Television film |
| 1994 | Model by Day | Captain | Television film |
| 1994 | RoboCop | Dr. Apollinaire Monet | Episode: "Face of Eve" |
| 1994 | Highlander: The Animated Series | Olak / Gorth | Episode: "The Suspended Village" |
| 1994–1995 | Wild C.A.T.S: Covert Action Teams | Additional voices | 13 episodes |
| 1995 | When the Dark Man Calls | Officer Erikson | Television film |
| 1995 | Hiroshima | Stephen Early | Television film |
| 1995 | The Song Spinner | Captain Nizzle | Television film |
| 1995 | Forever Knight | Dr. Max Venderwal | Episode: "Sons of Belial" |
| 1995 | The Neverending Story | Additional voices / Ysipy | 2 episodes |
| 1996 | Road to Avonlea | Lemuel Snibb | Episode: "Davey and the Mermaid" |
| 1996 | Ace Ventura: Pet Detective | Baron DeKlaus | 2 episodes |
| 1996 | Devil's Food | Deep Voice | Television film |
| 1996 | Goosebumps | Major McCall | Episode: "Revenge of the Lawn Gnomes" |
| 1996 | We the Jury | Judge Elton Roe | Television film |
| 1997 | Breach of Faith: A Family of Cops II | Mr. Yannis Ivanov | Television film |
| 1997 | The Outer Limits | Commandant | Episode: "The Camp" |
| 1997 | Inspired by Bach | Bert | Episode: "Sarabande" |
| 1997–2000 | Earth: Final Conflict | Jonathan Doors | 68 episodes |
| 1998 | Blazing Dragons | Duke Rudolf | Episode: "A Killer Makeover/The Age of Retention" |
| 1998 | The Adventures of Sam & Max: Freelance Police | Mack Salmon | Episode: "The Final Episode" |
| 1998 | The Last Don II | Bishop Enzo | 2 episodes |
| 1998 | Silver Surfer | The Supreme Intelligence / Husserl | 2 episodes |
| 1998 | Thunder Point | Sir Francis | Television film |
| 1999 | Judgment Day: The Ellie Nesler Story | Judge Polley | Television film |
| 1999 | Redwall | Asmodeus | 11 episodes |
| 1999 | Little Men | Mr. Able Jennings | Episode: "The Lantern Man" |
| 1999–2000 | Mythic Warriors | Various roles | 3 episodes |
| 1999–2000 | La Femme Nikita | George | 9 episodes |
| 2000 | Common Ground | Chester Burroughs | Television film |
| 2000 | Deliberate Intent | J. Michael Luttig | Television film |
| 2000 | Canada: A People's History | James Cook | Episode: "When the World Began" |
| 2000 | Redwall: The Movie | Asmodeus | Television film |
| 2000 | Building for Disasters | Narrator | Television film |
| 2001 | All Souls | Dr. Ryman Kreeger | Episode: "Pilot" |
| 2001 | Witchblade | Father John Bellamy | Episode: "Legion" |
| 2001 | Jane Doe | Phelps | Television film |
| 2001–2002 | Nero Wolfe | Lewis Hewitt | 4 episodes |
| 2002 | Salem Witch Trials | John Proctor | Television film |
| 2003 | The Piano Man's Daughter | Dr. Warren | Television film |
| 2006 | Yin Yang Yo! | Night Master | 2 episodes |
