= TekWar (TV series) =

TV series

- Also known as: William Shatner's TekWar
- Genre: Science fiction; Action
- Created by: William Shatner
- Developed by: Stephen Roloff
- Starring: Greg Evigan; Eugene Clark; Catherine Blythe; Torri Higginson; Natalie Radford; Maria del Mar; William Shatner
- Theme music composer: Warren Zevon
- Ending theme: "Real or Not"
- Composers: David Michael Frank; Louis Natale; Fred Mollin
- Countries of origin: Canada; United States
- Original language: English
- No. of seasons: 2
- No. of episodes: 22 (list of episodes)

Production
- Executive producers: William Shatner; Peter Sussman; Hans Beimler; Richard Manning
- Producers: Seaton McLean; Jamie Paul Rock; Stephen Roloff; John Calvert
- Production locations: Toronto, Ontario, Canada
- Editors: Bill Goddard; Dave Goard; Gary L. Smith
- Production companies: Atlantis Films Limited; Western International Communications; Lemli Productions; Universal Television

Original release
- Network: Syndication; CTV; USA Network; Sci Fi Channel
- Release: January 17, 1994 – February 9, 1996

TekWar is a television series, based on the TekWar novels ghost-written by Ron Goulart from outlines by William Shatner and developed for television by Stephen Roloff. The series follows Jake Cardigan (played by Greg Evigan), a former police officer turned private investigator working for Cosmos, a private security firm owned and operated by Walter Bascom (played by Shatner).

The series was broadcast in Canada on CTV and in the United States on USA Network and the Sci Fi Channel. The series, which was a co-production between Atlantis Films and Universal Television premiered on January 17, 1994 and ended on February 9, 1996.

== Overview ==
Set in the year 2044, the series follows Jake Cardigan, a former police officer who lost his badge after being framed for dealing in tek (an illicit narcotic-like substance) and murdering his fellow officers on a bust. Sentenced to fifteen years in cryo-detainment, Jake is released after four years, three months, and twenty-seven days.

Shortly after his release, Jake is contacted by Sid Gomez, his former partner. Sid is now in the private sector, working as an investigator for the large security firm Cosmos. After Sid reveals that it was Cosmos's CEO, Walter Bascom, who arranged to have him released early, Jake agrees to meet him. At the meeting, Jake agrees to work for Bascom as a private investigator going after Tek Lords, in return for Bascom's help in clearing his name.

== Cast ==
Character	Portrayed by	Occupation	Seasons	
Character	Portrayed by	Occupation	1	2
Jake Cardigan	Greg Evigan	Private Investigator, Cosmos	Main	Main
Sid Gomez	Eugene Clark	Private Investigator, Cosmos	Main	Main
Centra	Catherine Blythe	Assistant to Walter Bascom	Main	
Beth Kittridge	Torri Higginson	Doctor	Main	Main
Nika	Natalie Radford	Assistant to Walter Bascom		Main
Sam Houston	Maria del Mar	Private Investigator, Cosmos		Main
Walter Bascom	William Shatner	President & CEO, Cosmos	Main	Main
Lieutenant Winger	Maurice Dean Wint	Police Officer	Recurring	Recurring
Inspector Winterguild	David Hemblen	Police Officer	Recurring	
Sonny Hokori	Von Flores	Tek Lord	Recurring	
Danny Cardigan	Marc Marut; Christian Campbell	Student	Recurring	Recurring
Kate Cardigan	Sonja Smits	Housewife	Recurring	
Benett Sands	Ray Jewers	Businessman	Recurring	
Wiz	Dee McCafferty	Criminal	Recurring	
Cowgirl	Lexa Doig	Hacker	Recurring	Recurring
Wildside	Richard Chevolleau	Hacker	Recurring	Recurring
Shelley Grout	Dana Brooks	Special Agent, GSS		Recurring
Spaz	Ernie Grunwald	Hacker		Recurring
Carlyle Rossi	David Calderisi	CEO, Rossi Enterprises		Recurring

=== Main cast ===
- Greg Evigan as Jake Cardigan, a former police officer who, after being framed for crimes he did not commit goes to work for Walter Bascom at Cosmos. Jake uses a plasma propellant gun given to him by Bascom that fires non-lethal transparent pulses of plasma of varying intensities.
- Eugene Clark as Sid Gomez, a former police officer and Jake's partner at Cosmos.
- Catherine Blythe as Centra, Walter Bascom's assistant who provides technical support for Jake on his cases. She is a highly intelligent and a gifted technological expert.
- Torri Higginson as Beth Kittridge, an android who possesses all of the memories of the real Beth Kittridge. The android Beth discovers that the real Beth was a witness to the murders of Jake's partners and his near-death from a massive Tek overdose, from which she saved him. She grows to care for him and ultimately sacrifices herself to save Jake from a kamikaze android in the form of Jake's son. Near the end of the first TekWar movie, the real Beth is revealed to be alive. She is a doctor and is romantically involved with Jake Cardigan.
- Natalie Radford as Nika, another of Walter Bascom's assistants who provides technical support for Jake on his cases.
- Maria del Mar as Sam Houston, a police lieutenant and later Jake's partner at Cosmos.
- William Shatner as Walter Bascom, President and CEO of Cosmos. He is Jake's boss. He is shrewd, calculating and always seems to have an ulterior motive to his actions, but is a good man overall.

=== Recurring cast ===
- Maurice Dean Wint as Lieutenant Winger, an android police lieutenant who has an ongoing feud with Jake Cardigan. He was re-programmed by Sonny Hokori and was also responsible for the murders of Jake's partners and Jake's near-death of a Tek overdose. He was destroyed by Jake at the end of TekWar Season 1, but a new version of him returns to the job in Season 2.
- David Hemblen as Inspector Winterguild, Winger's partner. He doesn't believe that Jake was framed by the Tek Lords.
- Von Flores as Sonny Hokori, a Tek Lord. He framed Jake for dealing Tek and murder.
- Marc Marut and Christian Campbell as Danny Cardigan, Jake and Kate Cardigan's fifteen-year-old son. Danny is initially resentful of Jake's sudden return in TekWar, but it is shown in TekLords that they are rebuilding their relationship.
- Sonja Smits as Kate Cardigan, Jake's ex-wife and Danny's mother. She is married to wealthy industrialist Bennett Sands.
- Ray Jewers as Bennett Sands, a wealthy industrialist who is married to Kate Cardigan.
- Dee McCafferty as Wiz, a criminal Jake knows from his time as a police officer. He introduces Jake to Wildside and Cowgirl.
- Lexa Doig as Cowgirl, a hacker who frequently assists Jake on cases when he can't turn to Centra or Nika.
- Richard Chevolleau as Wildside, a hacker who works with Cowgirl.
- Dana Brooks as Shelley Grout, a government agent working for Government Special Services.
- Ernie Grunwald as Spaz, a hacker who works with Cowgirl.
- David Calderisi as Carlyle Rossi, CEO of Rossi Enterprises and foe of Jake Cardigan.

== Episodes ==
Tekwar began as a series of four television films which originally aired from January 17, 1994 to May 9, 1994. These are often referred to as the show's "first season" by fans and in episode guides despite not technically being a proper season. The series proper, or the "second season" if counting the movies as a season, consists of 18 hour-long episodes which originally aired between December 22, 1994 and February 9, 1996.

Season	Episodes	Originally aired		DVD release date			
Season	Episodes	Season premiere	Season finale	Region 1 (US)	Region 1 (CAN)	Region 2	Region 4
1	4	January 17, 1994	May 9, 1994	—N/a	May 24, 2011	—N/a	—N/a
2	18	December 22, 1994	February 9, 1996	June 10, 2008	April 20, 2004	—N/a	—N/a

== Development and production ==
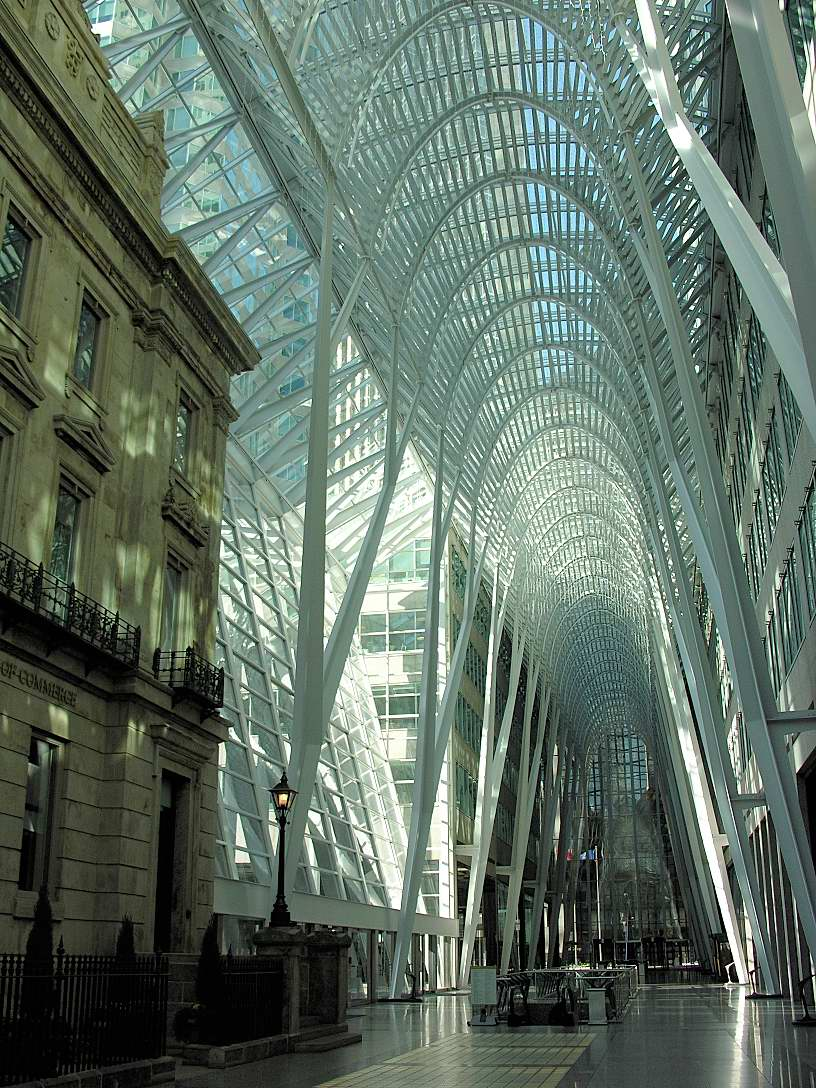
Brookfield Place in Toronto, Ontario, Canada was used for exterior shots of the Cosmos offices

TekWar was based on the series of Tek novels written by Ron Goulart from outlines by William Shatner. The initial idea for the novels occurred to Shatner in the 1980s. He said, "In the beginning I planned TekWar as a screenplay for myself to star in. I had this idea of putting T.J. Hooker into a futuristic milieu." But it was not until the 1988 Writers Guild of America strike stalled production on Star Trek V: The Final Frontier that he found time to write. Shatner said, "I'd doodle with a paragraph and it would grow into two pages. Then I'd fiddle with the two pages and that would become 20 pages. Eventually the book sort of evolved by itself."

While the novels and the later television series follow the same general storyline, setting the story 200 years in the future almost derailed any film or television adaptation. When Shatner approached networks and studios to pitch the idea of a TekWar project, he was told that it would be too expensive to produce. Marvel Comics eventually approached Shatner with the idea of launching a series of TekWar comic books. William Shatner sold the rights to Marvel for a comic book series under the condition that it be set only 50 years in the future.

Following the first TekWar comic book, Shatner was approached by studios interested in a film. Shatner's own production company, Lemli Productions, took a deal with Atlantis Films. Shortly thereafter, Steven Roloff was hired to develop the series for television. Roloff explained his role by saying "I was just supposed to sit around and think about how we would actually try to create the future for television on a television budget with those restrictions, knowing that we wouldn't be financed like Star Trek, and to put together a pitch book. So, I did that over a period of a few months and put together a pitch document which included a series of images and a kind of written description of our world. That went out and, after a little bit of wheeling and dealing, Atlantis Films struck a deal with Universal."

Shatner began to have second thoughts about the project when both studios insisted that his name be attached for marketing reasons. He thought, "How would it be received? If it's a failure, it's awful because my name is right there. In fact, they advertised it as William Shatner's TekWar. My God, the responsibility!" Universal and Atlantis green-lit production on four two-hour TV movies for the show's first season. If they proved successful, an hour-long series would be commissioned to air in both Canada and the United States. Filming took place at Cinevillage Studios in Toronto, Ontario, Canada and on locations in Toronto including Eaton Centre to Ontario Place.

== Broadcast history ==
USA Network flyer promoting the series

The four movies were first broadcast in 1994 on CTV in Canada and in syndication in the United States as part of Universal Television's Action Pack. The US broadcasts came 7 – 10 days ahead of those in Canada, on January 17, 1994 and January 25, 1994, respectively. TekWar was a ratings success, with some US stations reporting an increase of 44% compared to the same timeslot in November. This success prompted CTV and Universal to commission eighteen hour-long episodes. While the series continued on CTV in Canada, Universal moved the series to USA Network.

The show's second season premiered on CTV on December 22, 1994 and on USA on January 7, 1995. The season premiered strongly, scoring a 3.4 rating, which at the time was the highest rated premiere in the history of basic cable. As time went viewership declined in both Canada and the United States with the season's fourth episode ("Promises To Keep") only attracting 600-700,000 viewers on CTV. Ratings continued to slide during the season. USA Network canceled the series on June 13, 1995. Due to a simulcast agreement, both CTV and USA Network pulled the series from their respective schedules shortly after airing the season's fourteenth episode ("Forget Me Not") on July 1, 1995, leaving four episodes unaired.

The Sci Fi Channel, a corporate sibling of USA Network, subsequently purchased the rights to rebroadcast the series and began airing the series in late 1995. In early 1996, as the Sci Fi Channel was about to begin broadcasting the four unaired episodes in the United States, CTV announced they would air the remaining episodes of TekWar. The four unaired episodes began airing on CTV and Sci Fi Channel on January 20, 1996 and concluded on CTV on February 9, 1996 and on the Sci Fi Channel on February 10, 1996.

== Adult animated adaptation ==
A reboot as an adult animated adaptation was announced in September 2021. The project will be developed and written by Matt Michnovetz and produced by Pure Imagination Studios with Shatner's Shatner Universe.

== Critical reception ==
TekWar received average reviews. The Los Angeles Times said of the series: "No one will confuse William Shatner's TekWar with serious science-fiction. With Greg Evigan as a disgraced ex-cop teaming with another ex-cop, who's black, and a female android, it's a lot like 'The Mod Squad Visits Wild Palms'." The Pittsburgh Post-Gazette gave a negative review: "Keep the action flowing and the gizmos glowing and maybe no one will notice that your plot lacks the credibility of a politician's promise. It almost works for William Shatner, who has produced and directed the first of four telemovies based on his TekWar science-fiction novels."

Entertainment Weekly gave TekWar a grade of "D" saying: "This is basically your average cop show in a post-20th-century setting: Dullbladerunner. In this vision of the future, your house can be invested with enough artificial intelligence to tell you when your wife left to run errands, but society still hasn't found a cure for crime: there are a lot of rotten, poorly-shaven thugs out on those mean streets. Intended to be hard-boiled, the dialogue in TekWar is instead just pitiful. When a policeman tells Jake, 'I play by the rules,' our hero snaps back, 'Then start a band.' Huh?" Matt Roush of USA Today also gave a mixed review: "TekWar, the first of several futuristic B-thrillers based on William Shatner's genre novels, suggests a cross of Wild Palms with Starsky and Hutch. The gizmos and visual shimmer rarely disguise the fact this is just a gussied-up cop show. TekWar, directed by Shatner, gets the project off to a slick and zippy start, from the moment framed cop Jake Cardigan is revived after four years in cryo-submersion. Since Jake is played by plastic hunk Greg Evigan, awake is merely a relative term."

== Home video releases ==
=== VHS releases ===
Universal Studios Home Entertainment and CIC Video released the TV movies, comprising the show's first season, on 4 VHS tapes in 1995 in the United Kingdom and the United States. CIC Video also released the first TV movie, TekWar, on VHS in Germany in 1995. The 18 hour-long episodes, which constitute the show's second season, were never released on VHS in the US, however one tape was released in the UK in 2000 by Universal/Sci-Fi under the Cult TV Classics branding. It contained three episodes, Killer Instinct, Chill Factor and Deadline.

VHS release	Episodes	Originally aired	VHS release date		
VHS release	Episodes	Originally aired	United States (NTSC)	United Kingdom (PAL)	Germany (PAL)
TekWar	1	January 17, 1994	February 21, 1995	June 1, 1995	1995
TekLords	1	February 14, 1994	1995	June 1, 1995	—N/a
TekLab	1	February 21, 1994	1995	June 1, 1995	—N/a
TekJustice	1	May 9, 1994	1995	June 1, 1995	—N/a

=== DVD releases ===
Koch International released a DVD set titled TekWar - The Complete First Season (Volumes 1 - 5) in Canada on April 20, 2004. Despite its title, the set only contained the 18 hour-long episodes. Several years later, on June 10, 2008, Image Entertainment released a DVD set titled TekWar in the United States, also containing the 18 episodes.

After repeated delays, Alliance Home Entertainment released a DVD set in Canada titled TekWar - The Complete Series on May 24, 2011. The DVD set utilised cover art licensed from Image Entertainment. It was later reported that Alliance's DVD release did, in fact, include the four TV movies, billed on the set as being "the original 4 part pilot".

The series has yet to be released on DVD in Europe (Region 2).

There was also a DOS video game developed and published by Capstone, featuring digitized scenes recorded in front of a blue screen starring William Shatner. The first person shooter is considered one of the worst games made using the Build Engine, which was used to create other popular games such as Duke Nukem 3D and Blood.

DVD release	Episodes	Originally aired	DVD release date			
DVD release	Episodes	Originally aired	Region 1 (US)	Region 1 (CAN)	Region 2	Region 4
TekWar - The Complete First Season	18	1994–1996	—N/a	April 20, 2004	—N/a	—N/a
TekWar	18	1994–1996	June 10, 2008	—N/a	—N/a	—N/a
TekWar - The Complete Series	22	1994–1996	—N/a	May 24, 2011	—N/a	August 15, 2012

== International broadcasting ==
Country	Network	Premiere date
UK	Sky One	Fall 1995
Germany	RTL Television	Fall 1995
