= Eugene Clark (actor) =

American-Canadian actor and former football player (b. 1951)

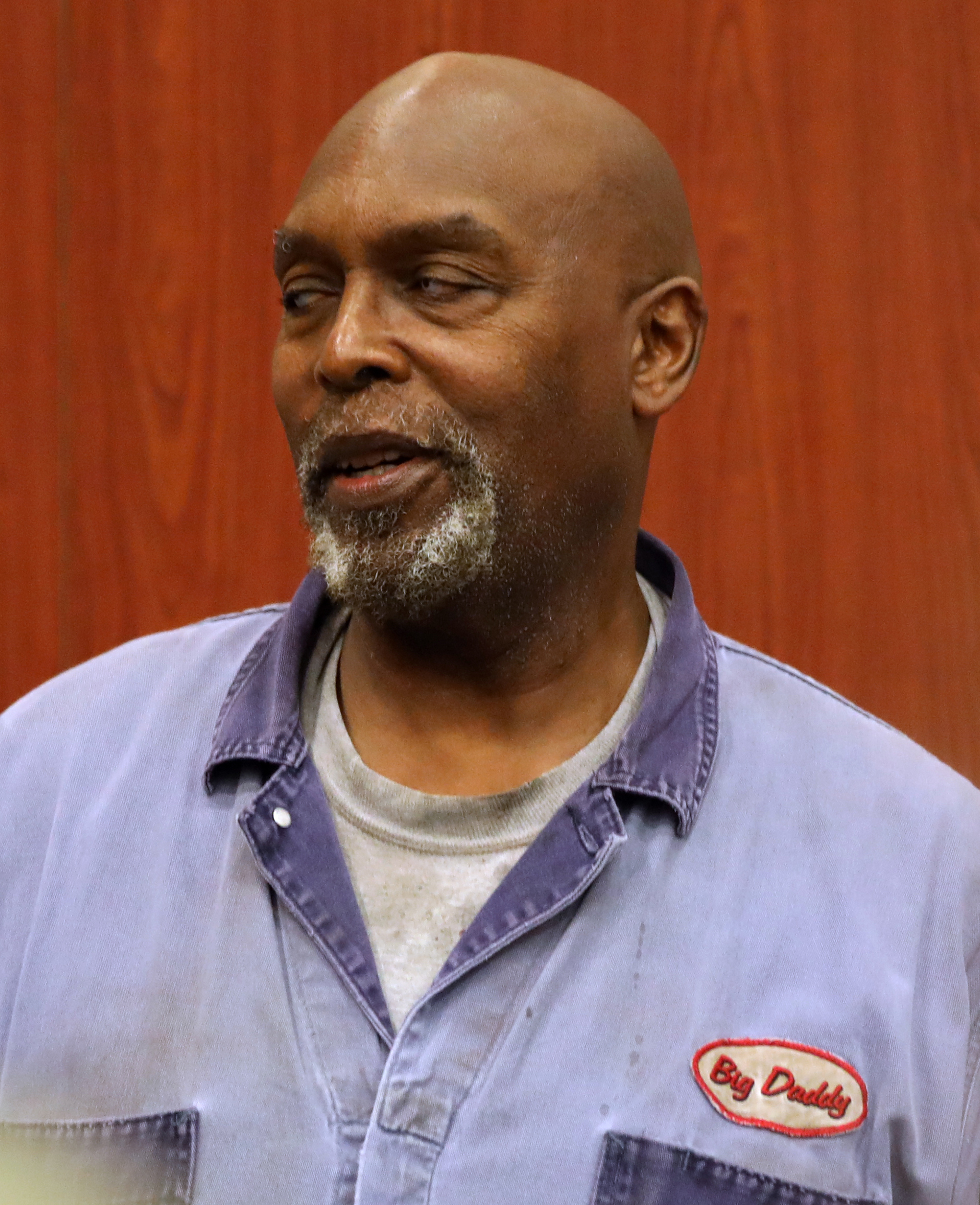
- Clark in 2024
- Born: Anthony Eugene Clark; December 3, 1951 (age 74); Tampa, Florida, U.S.
- Other names: Eugene A. Clark; Eugene Clarke; Gene Clark
- Football career

Profile
- Position: Offensive guard

Career information
- College: UCLA
- NFL draft: 1975: 9th round

Career history
- Toronto Argonauts (1977–1978)

Awards and highlights
- First-team All-Pac-8 (1974)
- Website: www.eugeneaclark.com

Eugene Anthony Clark (born December 3, 1951) is an American-Canadian actor and former professional football offensive guard.

He played two seasons in the Canadian Football League (CFL) for the Toronto Argonauts, in 1977 and 1978. As an actor, Clark is known for his role as Detective Colby Burns in the 1980s police drama Night Heat, which earned him a 1987 Gemini Award for Best Supporting Actor in a Drama Program or Series. He is also known for his role as the zombie 'Big Daddy' in George A. Romero's Land of the Dead (2005), and his work in musical theatre.

== Early life ==
Clark was born in Tampa, Florida, and was raised in Florida and Riverside, California. He graduated from Riverside Polytechnic High School, and earned a Bachelor's Degree in Psychology from the University of California, Los Angeles.

== Football career ==
He was an actor four years before he began playing college football and he was an all-conference offensive guard at UCLA. Named to the first All-Star teams for both the Pacific-8 and the West Coast Athletic Conference, Clark also received All Star All American Honorable Mention Laurels, played in the Hula Bowl and was selected by the Pittsburgh Steelers in the ninth round of the 1975 NFL draft. While he did not appear in a National Football League game, he did play in the Canadian Football League for 20 games for the Toronto Argonauts (in 1977 and 1978). (Note: A scan of a 1978 Toronto Argonauts program shows Clark's football biography and correct birthdate.)

== Acting career ==
Clark had a prominent co-starring role as Sid Gomez in the 1990s science fiction show William Shatner's Tek War.

He also appeared on Night Heat, RoboCop: Prime Directives, The Twilight Zone, Side Effects, Tropical Heat, Sue Thomas: F.B.Eye, The L.A. Complex, and made a cameo in Trailer Park Boys: The Movie. He also starred in the VH1 film Man in the Mirror: The Michael Jackson Story, Fighting the Odds: The Marilyn Gambrell Story', and the thriller Legend of the Mountain Witch.

Clark played the role of Mufasa in the Ontario production of The Lion King for two years.

Clark's best-known theatrical film role was in George A. Romero's Land of the Dead as the head zombie, "Big Daddy".

== Filmography ==
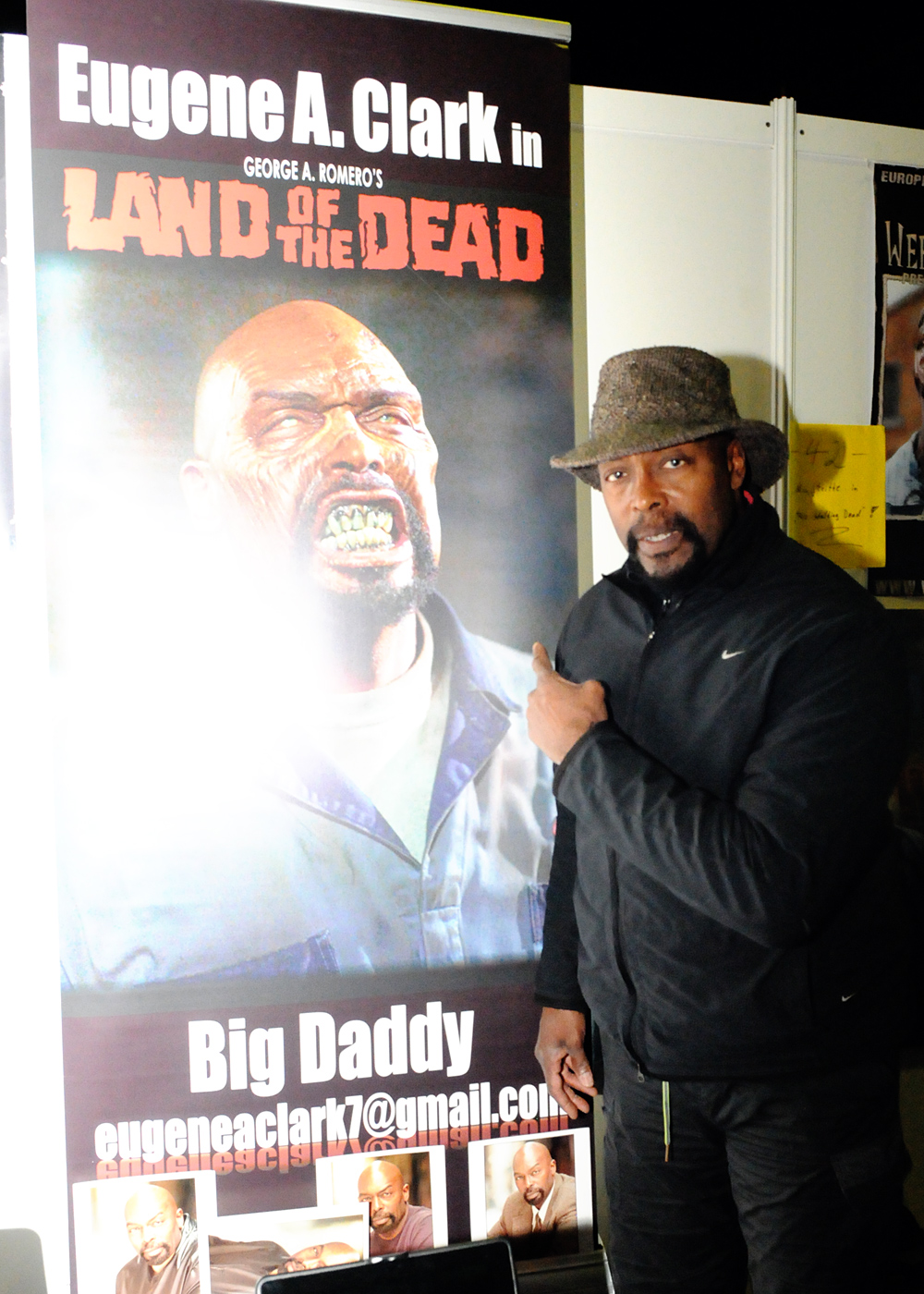
Clark at the Weekend Of Horrors 11 Convention Oberhausen, Germany, 2013

=== Film ===
Year	Title	Role	Notes
1981	Improper Channels	Security Guard #1	
1983	The Funny Farm	Myles	
1984	The House of Dies Drear	River Ross Darrow	TV movie
1984	Thrillkill	Grissom	
1985	Martin's Day	Hydro Repairman	
1985	Shellgame	Big Edward	TV movie
1986	Flying	Roy Teler	
1986	Doing Life	Wiggins	TV movie
1986	Unnatural Causes	Roberts	TV movie
1987	Three Men and a Baby	Man at Party #1	
1988	The Good Mother	Arch	
1989	The Unknown Mission	Craig Ashby	
1989	Mindfield	Hugh McVeigh	
1990	The Kissing Place	Bus Driver	TV movie
1990	Johnny Ryan	Joe Johnson	TV movie
1991	Knight Rider 2000	Officer Kurt Miller	TV movie
1991	Plymouth	Larry	TV movie
1992	The Swordsman	Police Captain	
1992	From the Files of Joseph Wambaugh: A Jury of One	Det. Dick Price	TV movie
1992	Split Images	Malik	TV movie
1993	Trial & Error	Andrew Barnes/Sandi Richards	TV movie
1993	Brian Spencer	Lenn Wright	TV movie
1994	TekWar	Sid Gomez	TV movie
1994	TekWar: TekLords	Sid Gomez	TV movie
1994	TekWar: TekLab	Sid Gomez	TV movie
1994	TekWar: TekJustice	Sid Gomez	TV movie
1994	Fatal Vows: The Alexandra O'Hara Story	Det. Cabrillo	TV movie
1995	Falling for You	Detective	TV movie
1995	Gladiator Cop	Police Captain	
1997	Joe Torre: Curveballs Along the Way	Bob Watson	TV movie
1997	Face Down	Captain McGuiness	TV movie
1997	Windsor Protocol	Vice President Anson Powers	TV movie
1998	Down in the Delta	Citizen 1	
1998	Free of Eden	'Fast' Freddie	TV movie
1998	Earthquake in New York	-	TV movie
1998	Dead Husbands	Sheriff Moss	TV movie
1999	In the Company of Spies	Edward Boyd	TV movie
1999	One Heart Broken Into Song	Hud Jarvis	
2000	The Magic of Marciano	Del	
2000	On Hostile Ground	Mayor John Lafitte	TV movie
2000	Who Killed Atlanta's Children?	Dave	TV movie
2000	Turn It Up	Marshall	
2000	Slow Burn	Attorney Marlowe King	
2001	Cause of Death	Det. Carmine De Luca	
2001	Loves Music, Loves to Dance	Desk Sergeant	TV movie
2002	Redeemer	-	TV movie
2003	Jasper, Texas	Don Clark	TV movie
2004	Reversible Errors	Chief Harold Greer	TV movie
2004	Man in the Mirror: The Michael Jackson Story	Bobby	TV movie
2005	Murder at the Presidio	Captain Donovan	TV movie
2005	Land of the Dead	Big Daddy	
2005	Fighting the Odds: The Marilyn Gambrell Story	Reginald Spivey	TV movie
2005	Knights of the South Bronx	Gene	TV movie
2006	Trailer Park Boys: The Movie	Cadillac	
2006	Doomstown	Officer Connors	TV movie
2007	Still Small Voices	Sergeant Gillett	TV movie
2007	Resurrecting the Champ	Washburn	
2007	Talk to Me	Bar Patron 2	TV movie
2007	Stir of Echoes: The Homecoming	Older Vet	TV movie
2009	Walled In	Burnett	
2009	Dolan's Cadillac	Tink	
2009	Deadliest Sea	Moss	TV movie
2009	Too Late to Say Goodbye	Richmond Chief	TV movie
2011	High Chicago	Buzz	
2012	Home Again	Principle Raye	
2012	Aladdin and the Death Lamp	Khalil	TV movie
2012	A Dark Truth	Clive Bell	
2014	Bully Fighters	Judge Princeton Sanders	Short
2014	An En Vogue Christmas	Nathan	TV movie
2015	Born to Be Blue	Henry Azuka	
2015	Look Again	Clarence	
2017	Bruno & Boots: This Can't Be Happening at Macdonald Hall	King Diaz	TV movie
2017	The Recall	Eddie Jackson	
2017	Christmas Next Door	Nick	TV movie
2019	Nostalgic Christmas	Martin DeLong	TV movie
2020	The Clark Sisters: First Ladies of Gospel	Presiding Bishop	TV movie
2020	Marry Me This Christmas	'Pops' Reed	TV movie
2021	The Long Island Serial Killer: A Mother's Hunt for Justice	Herc Zinneman	TV movie
2022	Designing Christmas	Vern	TV movie
2022	All I Didn’t Want for Christmas	Stan Harris	TV movie
2023	Deadly Estate	Harry Belfort	TV movie
2024	Mistletoe & Matrimony	-	TV movie

=== Television ===
Year	Title	Role	Notes
1973	Kung Fu	Comanchero	Episode: "The Spirit-Helper"
1976	Most Wanted	Cleveland Jones	Episode: "The Heisman Killer"
1985–89	Night Heat	Detective Colby Burns	Main Cast
1986	Seeing Things	Lonnie	Episode: "Optical Illusion"
1986	Philip Marlowe, Private Eye	Rufe	Episode: "Pickup on Noon Street"
1986	Hot Shots	Det. Colby Burns	Episode: "Accidental Victims" & "Riot"
1987	Echoes in the Darkness	Proctor Nowell	Episode: "Part I & II"
1987	Street Legal	Judge Rawlings	Episode: "Lost and Lonely Hearts"
1988	Alfred Hitchcock Presents	Andy Wilson	Episode: "User Deadly"
1988	War of the Worlds	Sgt. Gordon Reynolds	Episode: "The Resurrection: Part 1 & 2"
1989	The Twilight Zone	Capt. Henry Kincaid	Episode: "The Wall"
1989	Life Goes On	Ritcher	Episode: "Pilot"
1989	E.N.G.	Garbageman	Episode: "Dirty Trick"
1990	Equal Justice	Rev. Marcus Calvin	Episode: "Pilot"
1990	Nasty Boys	-	Episode: "Flesh and Blood"
1990	Carol & Company	Joey	Episode: "Reunion"
1990–91	E.N.G.	John Elman	Main Cast: Season 2
1991	In the Heat of the Night	L.A.P.D. Detective	Episode: "Just a Country Boy"
1991	Street Legal	Delroy Payne	Episode: "Shades of Difference" & "Questions of Dignity"
1991	Counterstrike	Clayton	Episode: "Fire in the Streets"
1991–92	Tropical Heat	Ollie Porte	Recurring Cast: Season 1-2
1992	Secret Service	Fats	Episode: "A Teller of Tales/Food for Thought"
1992	Great Scott!	Coach	Episode: "Pilot" & "Hair Scare"
1993	Top Cops	Wisdom	Episode: "Craig Chew/Denny Joyce/Norman Pressley"
1994	Catwalk	Burr	Episode: "Killing Time"
1994–95	TekWar	Sid Gomez	Main Cast
1995–96	Side Effects	Ray Whelan	Recurring Cast: Season 2
1996	Lonesome Dove: The Series	Foley	Episode: "Partners"
1997	Due South	Joe Mendelson	Episode: "Strange Bedfellows"
1998	The Last Don II	Agent McKiff	Episode: "Part I & II"
1998	Traders	-	Episode: "The Falcon and the Showman"
1999	Little Men	Samuel Tyler	Episode: "The Living Years"
1999	Earth: Final Conflict	Mayor Carter Dubois	Episode: "Déjà Vu"
1999	The City	Russell Carter	Episode: "Joy Ride: Part II"
2001	RoboCop: Prime Directives	Carver RH	Episode: "Meltdown"
2002	Doc	Coach Thomas	Episode: "Love of the Game"
2002–04	Sue Thomas: F.B.Eye	Ted Garrett	Recurring Cast
2003	The Wonderful World of Disney	Preacher #1	Episode: "Sounder"
2003	The District	Eugene Birch	Episode: "Blind Eye"
2004	Threat Matrix	Honorable Justice Lamb	Episode: "19 Seconds"
2005	Tilt	Dr. Marcellin	Episode: "Risk Tolerance"
2005	This Is Wonderland	Reverend Thomas	Guest Cast: Season 2-3
2007–10	The Latest Buzz	Mr. Pierce	Recurring Cast: Season 2-3
2009	The Line	Currie	Recurring Cast
2009	Majority Rules!	Frank	Episode: "Go Girl!"
2010–12	Wingin' It	Coach Heinrich	Recurring Cast
2011	Breakout Kings	The Mayor	Episode: "Where in the World Is Carmen Vega"
2011	Dan for Mayor	Police Chief Paddy O'Malley	Episode: "Awkward Speedoo"
2012	The Firm	Judge Pruill	Episode: "Chapter Five"
2012	Lost Girl	Fletcher	Episode: "The Girl Who Fae'd with Fire"
2012	The Listener	Abbassi Ayim	Episode: "The Taking"
2012	The L.A. Complex	Walter Dougan	Recurring Cast: Season 2
2013	Cracked	ETF Squad Leader	Episode: "Swans"
2014	Remedy	Curtis Decker	Episode: "The Little Things"
2014–17	Space Riders: Division Earth	Commander Stern	Recurring Cast
2015	The Art of More	Edward Leigh Mason	Main Cast: Season 1
2017	Private Eyes	Judge	Episode: "The P.I. Code"
2017	Dark Matter	Sheriff Vargas	Episode: "Isn't That a Paradox?"
2017	Frankie Drake Mysteries	Jack Porter	Episode: "Mother of Pearl"
2018	In Contempt	Franklin	Recurring Cast
2020	Blue's Clues & You!	Potato (voice)	Episode: "Growing with Blue"
2021	Coroner	Delmar McAvoy	Recurring Cast: Season 2
2020–22	Transplant	Marcus Curtis	Recurring Cast: Season 1, Guest: Season 2
2023	Hudson & Rex	Dave Nearing	Episode: "Lost and Found"
2023	Star Trek: Strange New Worlds	Vulcan Judge	Episode: "Ad Astra per Aspera"
2024	The Madness	Clarence	Recurring Cast
