= Marc Marut =

Canadian actor (born 1979)

- Born: April 11, 1979 (age 47); Winnipeg, Manitoba, Canada
- Years active: 1985-2004

Marc Marut (born April 11, 1979) is a former Canadian actor best known for playing the mentally deranged Johnny McFarley in the 1994 horror film The Paperboy when he was 14 years old. He has acted and appeared in various television series and films including the TV adaptation of Welcome to Dead House, Road to Avonlea, Kung Fu: The Legend Continues, Tekwar, Harrison Bergeron, and Street Legal.

== Personal life ==
Marut was born in Winnipeg, Manitoba and started his acting career in 1985 as Gavroche in the first Canadian production of Les Misérables in Toronto, Ontario. As a child actor, Marut gained mainstream attention outside of Canada for his lead role in The Paperboy, a film which was critically panned but has also since received a cult following. He is also known for playing Ray, a boy killed by mutated workers at a chemical factory in a small town, in Welcome to Dead House. He has appeared in a number of films, television series, theatrical productions and television commercials, mostly Canadian-based.

== Filmography ==
Year	Title	Role
1990	War of Worlds	Patrick
1990	My secret Identity	Young Benjamin
1991	Hammerman	Additional Voices
1992	Beyond Reality	Uncredited
1993	Street Legal	Luke Mcleod
1995	Kung Fu: The Legend Continues	Jason
1996	Ready Or Not	Henry
1997	Welcome to Dead House	Ray
1992	I'll Never Get to Heaven	George
1994	TekWar	Danny Cardigan
1994	Car 54, Where are you?	Kid in Chorus
1994	TekWar: TekLords	Danny Cardigan
1994	TekWar: TekJustice	Danny Cardigan
1994	The Paperboy	Johnny McFarley
1995	Harrison Bergeron	Todd
1996	Ed McBain's 87th Precinct: Ice	Park Rapist
1998	Happy Christmas, Miss King	Elbert Werts
1999	Cruel Justice	Quinn
2004	72 Hours: True Crime	Paul W.
