= Torri Higginson =

Canadian actress (born 1969)

- Higginson in 2026
- Born: Sarah Victoria Higginson; December 6, 1969 (age 56); Burlington, Ontario, Canada
- Occupation: Actress
- Years active: 1991–present

Sarah Victoria Higginson (born December 6, 1969) is a Canadian actress. She is best known for portraying Elizabeth Weir in the science fiction series Stargate Atlantis (2004–2008). Her other roles include Beth Kittridge in TekWar, Commander Delaney Truffault in Dark Matter (2015–2017), and Natalie Lawson in This Life (2015–2016).

Higginson is also a theatre actress, and has appeared in such plays as Three Tall Women, Weldon Rising, and Picasso at the Lapin Agile.

== Early life ==
Higginson was born in Burlington, Ontario, to Welsh parents. Her family moved around frequently, and she spent her childhood variously in Toronto, Montreal, Chicago, and Wales. Higginson and her sister were raised by a single mother. At the age of 18, she moved to England and studied to become an actor at the Guildhall School of Music and Drama in London, later returning to Canada.

== Career ==
In 1995, two years prior to Stargate SG-1's premiere, Higginson starred in the movie Jungleground with three other actors who would play roles in the Stargate franchise: Peter Williams (Apophis), JR Bourne (Martouf), and Lexa Doig (Dr. Lam). Higginson took over the role of Elizabeth Weir from Jessica Steen, appearing first in a guest spot in the season eight premiere of Stargate SG-1. Her character was carried over onto the spinoff Stargate Atlantis, where she starred in the main cast until the end of the show's third season, afterwards being reduced from a main cast member to a recurring role in the fourth season. She did not reprise the role for the show's fifth season.

In 2015, Higginson was cast in the CBC Television drama series This Life as Natalie Lawson, a lifestyle columnist and single mother who is diagnosed with terminal cancer. The series ran for two seasons, and was ultimately cancelled on January 24, 2017. In 2016, she portrayed Dr. Kessler on the KindaTV web series Inhuman Condition.

From 2015 to 2017 she had a recurring role as Delaney Truffault in the science fiction series Dark Matter, which was created by former Stargate producers Joseph Mallozzi and Paul Mullie.

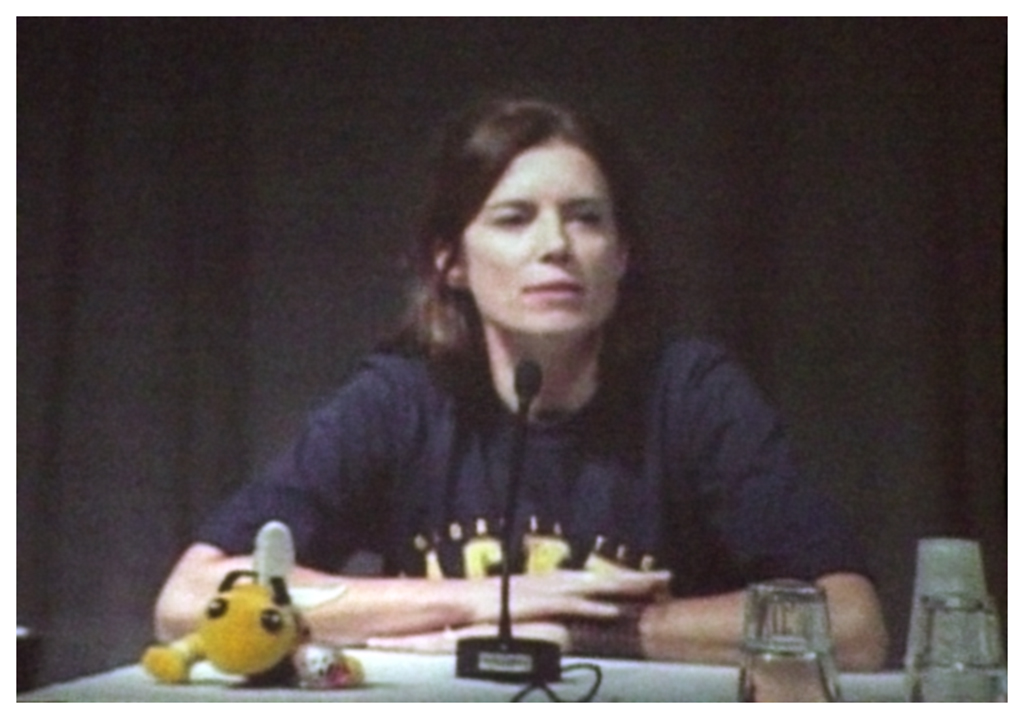
Higginson in 2006

In February 2021, it was announced that Higginson, who had a recurring role on the CTV medical series Transplant, was upgraded to a regular cast member for season 2 after the rights for the show were acquired by NBC.

== Personal life ==
Higginson lives in Los Angeles.

== Accolades ==
Higginson won a Gemini Award for Best Performance by an Actress in a Continuing Leading Dramatic Role for The City in 2000. In 2004, she was nominated for a Saturn Award for Best Supporting Actress on Television for her performance in Stargate Atlantis.

== Filmography ==
=== Films ===
Torri Higginson film credits
Year	Title	Role	Ref.
1991	The Photographer's Wife	Suzanna	
1995	Jungleground	Samantha Woods	
1995	When the Bullet Hits the Bone	Allison Doherty	
1995	Memory Run (Synapse)	Kristen	
1996	The English Patient	Mary	
1998	Double Take	Peggy	
1998	Airborne	Sara Gemmel	
2000	Rats	Nancy	
2001	Turning Paige	Sheila Newlands	
2003	Autopsy Room Four	Katie Arlen	
2003	Crust	Alice	
2003	Intent	Detective Jessica Cavallo	
2004	Vendetta: No Conscience, No Mercy	Lorraine Healey	
2005	Irish Eyes	Lorraine Healey	
2006	Save My Soul	Terra	
2007	You, Me, Love (Yumi in Love)	Leslie	
2009	Smile of April	Angie	
2016	The History of Love	Charlotte Singer	
2016	Blood Hunters	Marion	
2017	Nobility	Cdr. Eugenia Pikeman	
2017	Ordinary Days	Marie Cook	
2021	Lethal Love	Sandra Sullivan	

=== Television ===
Torri Higginson television credits
Year	Title	Role	Notes	Ref.
1992	Forever Knight	Erica	Episode: "Last Act"	
1992	The Women of Windsor	Gwen	TV movie	
1993	Family Pictures	Liddie	TV movie	
1993	E.N.G.	Madeline Shannon	Episode: "The Good Samaritan"	
1994	Counterstrike	Susan Kimberley	Episode: "Clear Cut"	
1994	TekWar	Beth Kittridge	TV movie	
1994	TekWar	Beth Kittridge	4 episodes	
1994	TekWar: TekLords	Beth Kittridge	TV movie	
1994	TekWar: TekJustice	Beth Kittridge	TV movie	
1997	Psi Factor: Chronicles of the Paranormal	Blythe Hall	1 episode	
1997	The Absolute Truth	Unknown	TV movie	
1997	Balls Up	Jenny	TV movie	
1998	Highlander: The Raven	Claudia Hoffman	Episode: "Reborn"	
1999	The Outer Limits	Alyssa Selwyn	Episode: "The Haven"	
1999	Storm of the Century	Angela Carver	TV miniseries	
1999	Family of Cops 3	Caroline Chandler	TV movie	
1999	The City	Katharine Strachan	TV movie	
2000	Twice in a Lifetime	Becca Curtis	Episode: "Sins of our Father"	
2001	'Twas the Night	Abby Wrigley	TV movie	
2001	Canada: A People's History	Susan Agnes Bernard	2 episodes	
2002	Bliss	Kate	Episode: "Valentine's Day in Jail"	
2002	Stone Undercover	Aurora 'Isabelle' MacDonald	Episode: "Dead Dog Rain" parts 1 & 2	
2004	Stargate SG-1	Elizabeth Weir	3 episodes	
2004	Preview to Atlantis	Elizabeth Weir	TV special	
2004	From Stargate to Atlantis: Sci Fi Lowdown	Elizabeth Weir	TV special	
2004–2008	Stargate Atlantis	Elizabeth Weir	63 episodes	
2007–2009	NCIS	Jordan Hampton	2 episodes	
2008	Desperate Hours: An Amber Alert	Chief Geiger	TV movie	
2008	Eleventh Hour	Alex	Episode: "Titans"	
2010	Stonehenge Apocalypse	Kaycee Leeds	TV movie	
2010	The Cult	Evelyn	TV movie	
2010	The Whole Truth	Judge Jerue	1 episode	
2011	Criminal Minds: Suspect Behavior	Nurse Karen	Episode: "See No Evil"	
2011	Chase	Sandra	Episode: "Father Figure"	
2015	This Life	Natalie Lawson	20 episodes	
2015–2017	Dark Matter	Delaney Truffault	10 episodes	
2016	Inhuman Condition	Michelle Kessler	33 episodes; web series	
2018	NCIS: Los Angeles	CIA Deputy Director for Operations, Alison Baker	1 episode	
2020–2024	Transplant	Claire Malone	48 episodes	
2025	Sullivan's Crossing	Marissa Jones	2 episodes	
