= Von Flores =

Canadian actor

- Born: Valentin Andres Tanga Flores IV; 5 April 1960 (age 66); Malabon, Metro Manila, Philippines
- Education: American Academy of Dramatic Arts
- Occupation: Actor
- Years active: 1987–present
- Children: 2

Valentin Andres Tanga "Von" Flores IV (born 5 April 1960) is a Filipino-Canadian actor, best known for his television work. He notably starred as Ronald Sandoval on the science-fiction series Earth: Final Conflict (1997–2002), and portrayed Manny Santos' father Joseph Santos on Degrassi: The Next Generation (2005–08)

== Early life and education ==
Von was born in Malabon and lived in Pateros until age 13 when his family migrated to Toronto, Ontario, Canada. He studied at the American Academy of Dramatic Arts in New York City and the Centre for Actors' Study in Toronto.

== Career ==
Flores' first audition landed him a guest starring role on Night Heat. Flores went on to perform roles in a number of television productions, including the series Kung Fu: The Legend Continues and the Atlantis Films TekWar, TekJustice and TekLords TV movies. He has guest starred on such series as The Adventures of Sinbad, Lonesome Dove: The Outlaw Years, Forever Knight, E.N.G., Street Legal and Degrassi: The Next Generation.

Flores played Ronald Sandoval in Gene Roddenberry's Earth: Final Conflict, one of the lead characters and the only character to regularly appear in all 5 seasons.

Flores has also appeared in feature films, most notably in the critically acclaimed I Love a Man in Uniform and Eclipse. He also appeared in the 1995 film Picture Perfect as well as in the 1998 film Dogboys with Dean Cain and Tia Carrere.

Flores played Suba, a uranium smuggler in La Femme Nikita episode "Treason" (S1E7), which was broadcast on CTV and USA Network. In other works, he has played multiple roles in a variety of episodes from the internationally acclaimed television programme Mayday, his first role coming as Captain Ed Reyes in the season three episode "Bomb on Board" (Philippine Airlines Flight 434). Since then, he has played Captain Zaharie Ahmad Shah in "Where is Malaysia 370?" (Malaysia Airlines flight 370) and co-pilot Zuwaldi in "Lethal Turn" (Garuda Indonesia Flight 152). More recently, he has played the part of the lead investigators in the episodes "Caught on Tape" (TransAsia Airways Flight 235), "Deadly Go Round" (China Airlines Flight 140), "No Warning" (Trigana Air Flight 267), "Grounded: Boeing Max 8" (Lion Air Flight 610), and "Power Struggle" (Sriwijaya Air Flight 182).

== Filmography ==
=== Film ===
Year	Title	Role	Notes
1989	Renegades	Gangbanger	
1989	Fireballs	Japanese Fireman	
1991	The Big Slice	Sing Won Duck	
1993	A Man in Uniform	Kenny	
1993	Zero Patience	Ray	
1994	Car 54, Where Are You?	Mr. Kim	
1994	Eclipse	Henry	
1994	Soft Deceit	Hooker / Detective	
1995	Johnny Mnemonic	Viet Scientist	
1996	Foreign Bodies	Denny	
1996	Darkman III: Die Darkman Die	Johnny Lee	
1997	The Assignment	Koj	
2004	Ham & Cheese	A.D. (MOW)	
2004	The Confessor	Father Andrews	
2019	Let It Snow	Mr. Bernal	

=== Television ===
Year	Title	Role	Notes
1988	Night Heat	Danny Kai	Episode: "Chinatown"
1988	War of the Worlds	Alex	Episode: "A Multitude of Idols"
1988, 1990	Friday the 13th: The Series	Hitoshi Tanaka / A.J.	2 episodes
1989	My Secret Identity	Dan Chen	Episode: "The Eyes of the Shadow"
1989	Street Legal	Domingo Apalma	Episode: "Soul Custody"
1989	E.N.G.	Seiji Koko	Episode: "The Chilling Effect"
1991	Top Cops	Cinco	Episode: "Memorial Show"
1992	Beyond Reality	Soong	Episode: "The Fire Within"
1993	The Hidden Room	Vinh	Episode: "While She Was Out"
1993–96	Kung Fu: The Legend Continues	Jack Wong / Marco	8 episodes
1994	TekWar	Sonny Hokori	Television film
1994	TekLords	Sonny Hokori	Television film
1994	Model by Day	Johnny Lee	Television film
1994	TekWar: TekJustice	Sonny Hokori	Television film
1994	Forever Knight	Tran	Episode: "Can't Run, Can't Hide"
1995	Down Came a Blackbird	Minh	Television film
1995	Picture Windows	Judo Instructor	Episode: "Armed Response"
1995	Picture Perfect	Marco	Television film
1996	Gridlock	Mr. Seven	Television film
1996	Conundrum	Linh Tze Chou	Television film
1996	Lonesome Dove: The Series	Harry	Episode: "The Robbery"
1996	F/X: The Series	Albert Volk	Episode: "The Ring"
1996, 1997	The Adventures of Sinbad	Tetsu	2 episodes
1997	La Femme Nikita	Suba	Episode: "Treason"
1997	Johnny 2.0	Carlos	Television film
1997–2002	Earth: Final Conflict	Ronald Sandoval / Jason	Main cast
1998	Blood on Her Hands	Mike Lee	Television film
1998	Dogboys	Miguel	Television film
1998	Universal Soldier II: Brothers in Arms	Jong Sung	Television film
1999	Sirens	Assistant Coroner	Television film
2001	My Daughter's Secret Life	Kong	Television film
2001	Largo Winch	Ahmed Pangkor	2 episodes
2002	Adventure Inc.	Che Lao	Episode: "Memento Mori"
2003	Starhunter	Darnell	Episode: "Torment"
2004	Doc	Mr. Euchi	Episode: "No Pain, No Gain"
2004	Home Beyond the Sun	Colonel Khan	Television film
2005	Plague City: SARS in Toronto	Father Louis	Television film
2005	Human Trafficking	Rico	Miniseries
2005–08	Degrassi: The Next Generation	Mr. Joseph Santos	8 episodes
2005–25	Air Crash Investigation	Various roles	9 episodes
2006	This Is Wonderland	Sammy	Episode #3.13
2006	Cow Belles	Nick Perez	Television film
2006	Angela's Eyes	Kevin	Episode: "Eyes on the Prize"
2008	ReGenesis	Mr. Lee	Episode: "Hep Burn and Melinkov"
2008	Degrassi Spring Break Movie	Mr. Santos	Television film
2008	Never Cry Werewolf	Detective Stalling	Television film
2009	The Line	Eddie	15 episodes
2009	The Dating Guy	Customs Agent	Episode: "Boner Donor"
2009	Cra$h & Burn	Efram Garcia	Episode: "Freedom"
2009	The Border	Ashin Nanda	Episode: "Dying Art"
2011	InSecurity	Dr. Ho Lung	Episode: "Spies on Ice"
2011	Skins	Hamilton Valero	Episode: "Daisy"
2011	Lost Girl	Donovan	Episode: "Death Didn't Become Him"
2012	Rookie Blue	Edwin Santos	Episode: "A Good Shoot"
2013	The Listener	Tai Ling	Episode: "Witness for the Prosecution"
2013	Nikita	Kramer	2 episodes
2014	Lucky 7	Dr. Chu	Episode: "Five More Minutes"
2015	Killjoys	Suspicious Man	Episode: "Escape Velocity"
2017	Conviction	Lu Jin	Episode: "Black Orchid"
2017	Designated Survivor	Dr. Shen	Episode: "Outbreak"
2018	The Detectives	Detective Joe Malicdern	Episode: "Home"
2018	Frankie Drake Mysteries	Curator	Episode: "The Old Switcheroo"
2019	Private Eyes	Irving Guzman	Episode: "It Happened One Fight"
2019	5000 Years of Heroes	Li Yiji	2 episodes
2020	Coroner	Mario	Episode: "Borders"
2020	Nurses	Tenzin	Episode: "Chrysalis"
2020	Rising Suns	Charles Montenegro	3 episodes
