= The Paperboy (1994 film) =

1994 film by Douglas Jackson

- Official VHS cover
- Directed by: Douglas Jackson
- Written by: David E. Peckinpah
- Produced by: Tom Berry; Franco Battista; Stefan Wodoslawsky; Pierre David; Henry Seggerman
- Starring: Alexandra Paul; Marc Marut; William Katt; Karyn Dwyer; Krista Errickson; Frances Bay
- Cinematography: Rodney Gibbons
- Edited by: Yves Langlois
- Music by: Milan Kymlicka
- Production company: Allegro Films
- Distributed by: Image Organization
- Release date: November 16, 1994
- Running time: 89 minutes
- Country: Canada
- Language: English
- Budget: $2 million

The Paperboy is a 1994 Canadian horror film starring Alexandra Paul, Marc Marut and William Katt.

== Plot ==
Johnny McFarley, a 12-year-old paperboy, arrives at elderly Mrs. Thorpe's home and asphyxiates her with a plastic bag.

When her daughter Melissa returns home from teaching seventh grade English, she receives a phone call telling her that her mother has died. Melissa and her daughter, Cammie, travel back to Melissa's hometown for the funeral. Once they arrive at Mrs. Thorpe's home, they are greeted by an enthusiastic Johnny, who offers to take their luggage inside. Johnny asks permission to join them at the funeral. While he's riding in the funeral limousine, Johnny reveals that his mother is dead and his father, a salesman, is rarely around because of his nature job.

At the funeral home, he and Cammie sneak inside the room where the caskets are kept. Johnny gets in one, making Cammie uncomfortable; he intimidates her into keeping this secret.

Afterwards, Johnny hides a baby monitor inside the Thorpe house so he can eavesdrop. Later, Melissa invites Johnny to a barbecue she and Cammie are having; Johnny accepts on condition he is allowed to cook. Johnny takes a video of the BBQ while he waits for Melissa, only to discover that she is going on a date with her boyfriend. After seeing Brenda come over, that was Cammie's babysitter who dislikes Johnny, Johnny reacts violently by smashing a barbecue plate and then runs to his home.

Johnny returns to Melissa's house to apologize, only to find Brenda making out with her boyfriend. Brenda catches him and tells Melissa about Johnny spying on her. Brenda catches Johnny on his bicycle and sprays him with water. Johnny seeks revenge by causing Brenda to fall and injure herself which is successful in his scheme, then explains casually to Melissa that Brenda broke her neck and is now paraplegic.

When Johnny takes Cammie along to collect money from his paper route, he tells her that his customer Mrs. Rosemont is a witch. When Johnny goes to retrieve his money from the mailbox, Mrs. Rosemont warns Cammie that Johnny is "not right in the head", has the Mark of Cain, and that she should avoid him. When Melissa hears about this, she confronts Rosemont, who says she was only warning Cammie: "That McFarley boy, he's bad!"

Johnny sneaks into Melissa's house to make an apple pie, telling Melissa his mom always made him one when he behaved. Melissa is not pleased. She tells Johnny she is not his mother and asks him to leave. Johnny gets mad and breaks a plate. He then pulls back a knife as if he is going to stab Melissa and Cammie, but instead stabs the table and glares at them. Later that night, Johnny, along with his father, apologizes. Melissa tells Johnny he's not allowed to visit unless he is invited. She tells his father he should spend more time with him. Johnny's father gives his son a set of golf clubs to apologize for being absent, and tells Johnny that they will be spending much more time together in California because of a recent promotion. Fearing that he will not see "his family" again, Johnny kills his father with a fold-out putter, declaring he already has a new life. Johnny moves his father's car into the garage and calls his company, telling them he is ill and no longer interested in his promotion.

Melissa learns from Mrs. Rosemont that Johnny was emotionally and physically abused by his authoritarian, religious mother, and that he murdered her by pushing her downstairs. Melissa calls Brian and tells him they can have Johnny placed in foster care if they can prove he's neglected as well as abused. Johnny overhears this (owing to his eavesdropping device); he grows angry and rides his bike to Mrs. Rosemont's house. He snatches her asthma inhaler and makes her believe he killed her dog – he actually smashed ketchup bottles while the dog was in a different room, completely fine. Mrs. Rosemont has a fatal asthma attack.

Johnny goes to Brian's workplace, knocks him out, and sets him and the marina on fire. Unknown to Johnny, Brian manages to regain consciousness and escapes. Johnny then calls Melissa and tells her to come to his house. Melissa refuses until she hears Cammie calling her name. Johnny reveals that he killed Melissa's mother to lure them to the house in hopes of starting a new family. Melissa frantically searches Johnny's house wherever she hears Cammie's voice only to find that the sound has been coming from Johnny's home movie and the baby monitor in the basement. Melissa refuses to be Johnny's mother, declaring that she and her family do not love him. After being enraged and heartbroken, Johnny tries to bury Melissa in a hole created for his father, but she escapes.

Now completely unhinged, Johnny pursues Melissa and Cammie with a pickaxe. Johnny and Melissa struggle with the axe until the police arrive. Johnny frantically claims Melissa is crazy and tried to kill him, even saying she murdered his father. However, to his horror, Johnny sees Brian step out of the squad car, saying that it's over, having already told the police everything. The cops take Johnny away as he breaks down hysterically and vainly begs for Melissa to tell them that he is a good boy and for the cops to let him go, while the cops have a talk with Melissa, Brian and Cammie about the whole situation with Johnny as the movie ends.

== Cast ==
- Marc Marut as Johnny McFarley
- Alexandra Paul as Melissa Thorpe
- William Katt as Brian
- Karyn Dwyer as Brenda
- Krista Errickson as Diana
- Frances Bay as Mrs. Rosemont
- Brigid Tierney as Cammie Thorpe
- Barry Flatman as Mr. McFarley
- Derek Johnston as Brenda's Boyfriend
- Claire Riley as Jeanne Stalcup
- Jenny Campbell as Tiffany
- Mathieu Kermoyan as Uri
- Bobo Vian as Dora
- James Rae as Travis
- Frelin The Dog as Peaches The Dog
- Sam Stone (uncredited) as Police Sergeant

== Production ==
=== Filming ===
Principal photography started on July 26, 1993, and ended on August 27, 1993.

== Reception ==
When the film appeared on VHS, Entertainment Weekly gave it an enthusiastic review: "incredibly fun... the best movie about an evil kid since The Omen".
