= Picture Perfect (1995 film) =

1995 American TV movie

- VHS cover art
- Directed by: Joseph L. Scanlan
- Written by: Gregory K. Pincus
- Produced by: Julian Marks
- Starring: Richard Karn; Dave Thomas; Mary Page Keller; Lisa Jakub; Christian Campbell; Cecilley Carroll; John Lefebvre; Nada Despotovich; Von Flores
- Cinematography: Laszlo George
- Edited by: David B. Thompson
- Music by: Micky Erbe; Maribeth Solomon
- Distributed by: Feature Films for Families; American Broadcasting Company
- Release date: October 14, 1995
- Running time: 96 minutes
- Country: United States
- Language: English

Picture Perfect is a 1995 made-for-television comedy film by Feature Films for Families (FFFF) starring Richard Karn and Dave Thomas. First telecast October 14, 1995, on ABC, the film follows the attempt by two families to fool Ernie Barrett, owner and CEO of Barrett's Natural Soda, into believing that they are one family.

== Plot ==
Alan Walters and his single mother, Vicky, live next door to widower George Thomas and his daughters, J.J. and Delia. The three children are close friends, united by their dislike for Vicky's boyfriend Bob Blanford and nosy neighbor Eve Scrimmer. However, the children's parents hate each other.

George, a struggling children's book author, has decided to sell their house. To prevent this, J.J. and Alan enter both families as one in a contest to find the perfect family, sponsored by Barrett's Natural Soda. The winning family would receive $100,000 cash, college tuition for all the kids, a new house, a life-time supply of Barrett's Natural Soda, and a pre-release taste of the newest flavor of soda. After padding their entry essay with exaggerations and lies, the company's CEO, Ernie Barnett, shows up at the Walters' house to announce them as a finalist family. The kids are thrilled until Ernie reveals that he and Marco, a documentary cameraman, have come to live with them for a week to document their 'perfect' family. The children are forced to tell their parents about their plot. Vicky and George plan to tell Barrett the truth when they are confronted by FBI agents Sloan and Malone, investigating Barrett for industrial espionage. They insist that it is the 'patriotic duty' of the family to continue the ruse in order to gain Ernie's trust and obtain samples of the new soda flavor.

George and the girls quickly move into the Walters' house just in time to welcome Ernie and Marco with the camera. George and Vicky find it difficult to live together peacefully, while the children keep Ernie distracted. Alan's Grandma Matilda arrives to take the families to the beach for a day of fun, and attempts to play matchmaker with George and Vicky, much to their chagrin. While at the beach, Alan is approached by Sloan and Malone, who reveal that they now know about the deception going on. They threaten Alan that if he does not get them a sample of the new soda flavor, the whole family could be thrown into prison for fraud. Meanwhile, Vicky's suspicious boyfriend Bob has followed them to the beach and insists that Vicky meet his parents this week as the next step in their relationship.

Once the families are back home, Matilda asks Ernie out for dinner the next day. George realizes he has forgotten a date with his editor, Amanda Holt, who only agrees to edit his books if he goes out with her. He makes an excuse and reschedules. The next day, kids all realize too late that all three couples are headed to the same nice restaurant for dinner. They all spend the evening attempting to prevent their dates from discovering the truth, while trying to keep the lies straight. The kids come to the rescue. Back home, Vicky and George discover that they both feel pushed into their current relationships.

Alan quits his band because they want to play songs he dislikes. George, who used to play guitar, convinces him to keep playing. The whole family attends an open mike night at a local pub, because Ernie believes that George plays there every week. George gets stage fright until Alan comes up on stage and joins him with an electric guitar. George and Alan perform You Really Got Me. After watching taped reruns of their performance at home, Ernie declares that he has seen enough, and has decided they are his 'Perfect Family'. This upsets J.J., who tells her father that she is worried that after they turn Ernie over to the FBI, everything will go back to the way it was, and no one will be happy.

At the family barbeque the next day, Ernie has the samples of the new Barret's Natural Soda flavor. Ms. Scrimmer arrives to expose the families' deception to Ernie, and Bob shows up to confront Vicky. They fall for each other and leave together. George's editor Amanda also drops by, and since Ernie is watching, George has to maintain the lie that he's married to Vicky. She dumps him and says he'll never publish again. Alan grabs a can of the new soda and goes out front to meet Sloan and Malone. Instead of handing them the can, he accuses them of not being real FBI agents. After they threatened him at the beach, he called the FBI, who denied they were agents. Alan pours the can out, but Malone tastes some off the driveway, and reveals the new flavor to be chocolate. Marco the cameraman appears with a gun and a badge, revealing himself as a real undercover agent with the FBI. He arrests Sloan and Malone as industrial spies for Barrett's largest competitor.

Ernie declares them the official winners of the contest, but Vicky and George come clean. They insist that they are not a family. Ernie counters that they have all lived together for a week, and that they demonstrated all the qualities of a perfect family. Ernie is upset, thinking he has to start the contest over again. However, George and Vicky realize that they have fallen in love and share a kiss. They win the contest and have a beautiful wedding, with all of their friends, family, and neighbors in attendance.

== Cast ==
- Richard Karn as George Thomas:

A widower, struggling to make enough to support his two daughters. He frequently clashes with his neighbor Vicky.

- Mary Page Keller as Vicky Walters:

A strong-willed single mother struggling to make ends meet for her and her son after her husband leaves her.

- Dave Thomas as Ernie Barrett:

Founder and CEO of his own soda company, Barrett's Natural Soda. Because he believes that family values are the most important aspect of life and business, he designs a contest to find the 'perfect family' to represent his brand.

- Lisa Jakub as J.J. Thomas:

George's older daughter and Alan's best friend.

- Nada Despotovich as Eve Scrimmer:

The classic nosy neighbor, she uncovers the two families' deception and attempts to blow their cover by telling Mr. Barrett.

- Christian Campbell as Alan Walters:

Vicky's teenage son and J.J.'s best friend. He plays guitar in a high school band and is great with computers.

- Cecilley Carroll as Deila Thomas:

George's younger daughter, Deila is much smarter than others her age and loves to read mysteries.

- Von Flores as Marco:

Mr. Barrett's documentary filmmaker, and an undercover FBI field agent.

- John Lefebvre as Bob Blanford:

Vicky's clueless boyfriend, who wants to move the relationship to the next level. The children dislike Bob and attempt to get rid of him multiple times. During the deception, the family tells Mr. Barrett that Bob is their next-door neighbor, a Mr. Popporoppakovsky.

- Lori Hallier as Amanda Holt:

George's editor, she is constantly blackmailing George to go out with her, or she will refuse to edit his novels.

Other cast members include Barbara Gordon as Alan's Grandma Matilda, Peter Keleghan as Agent Sloan and Ric Reid as Agent Malone, FBI agents who are investigating Ernie Barrett, Michelyn Emelle as FBI Agent Ella, Bill Copeland and Maggie Howard as Harvey and Rachel Blanford, Bob's parents, Robert Windsor as Maitre D', and Addison Bell as Bruce Miller.
