= Hammerman =

Animated television series

- Created by: MC Hammer
- Directed by: Michael Maliani
- Starring: MC Hammer
- Voices of: Neil Crone; Clark Johnson; Jeff Jones; Miguel Lee; Joe Matheson; Susan Roman; Ron Rubin; Carmen Twillie; Louise Vallance; Maurice Dean Wint
- Composers: The Music Team; Mark Simon (additional music)
- Countries of origin: United States; Canada; Italy
- No. of seasons: 1
- No. of episodes: 13

Production
- Executive producers: Andy Heyward; Louis Burrell
- Producer: Kevin O'Donnell
- Editors: Mark A. McNally; Susan Odjakjian
- Running time: 23 minutes
- Production companies: DIC Animation City; Bustin' Productions, Inc. Reteitalia

Original release
- Network: ABC (United States); Telecinco (Spain)
- Release: September 7, 1991 – 1992

Hammerman is an animated series, starring rapper MC Hammer, which aired for thirteen episodes on ABC in the fall of 1991. It was produced by DIC Animation City and Italian company Reteitalia S.p.A., in association with Spanish network Telecinco.

== Synopsis ==
Youth center worker Stanley Burrell (Hammer's real name) owns a pair of magical dancing shoes (which are alive and can speak), which when worn cause Burrell to transform into the superhero Hammerman. He frequently gets advice from his "Gramps", who was a former owner of the shoes and was known as Soulman. While in the guise of Hammerman, Burrell was dressed in MC Hammer's signature purple Hammer pants and myriad golden chains.

The show was hosted by the real MC Hammer, who also sang the show's theme song, telling about the origin of Hammerman. Back in the 1960s and 1970s, Gramps (Robert Nameson) was the superhero Soulman, but as he grew older, he grew weaker and was forced to retire. Gramps and his granddaughter Jodie traveled to find the next new superhero. Their search was over when they met Stanley and he put on the shoes. In each episode, Hammerman faced various social issues; at the end of each episode, MC Hammer would speak to the audience and provide methods to address these issues themselves.

== Cast ==
- MC Hammer - Hammerman/Stanley Burrell (live action)
- Neil Crone
- Clark Johnson - Hammerman (cartoon)
- Jeff Jones
- Miguel Lee
- Joe Matheson
- Susan Roman - Hammerman's Would-Be Girlfriend
- Ron Rubin - Righty
- Carmen Twillie - Fly Girls
- Louise Vallance - Jodie
- Maurice Dean Wint - Showbiz

=== Additional voices ===
- Philip Akin
- Réal Andrews
- Jason Burke
- George Buza
- Len Carlson
- Rob Cowan
- Michelyn Emelle
- Dan Hennessey - Boss Grindenheimer
- Marc Marut
- Greg Morton
- Jackie Richardson
- Judith Scott
- Errol Slue
- Michael Stark
- John Stocker - Defacely Marmeister
- Marlow Vella
- Richard Yearwood

== Episodes ==
While the airdates and order of most episodes is unknown, "Defeated Graffiti", the first episode (as confirmed by MC Hammer's comments at the beginning of the episode), aired on September 7, 1991. The cartoon aired on Saturday mornings at 10 AM on ABC.

No.	Title	Written by	Original release date
1	"Defeated Graffiti"	Reed Shelly and Bruce Shelly	September 7, 1991
Hammerman and the Oaktown Rec Center Kids confront a crime wave that sweeps the neighborhood.
2	"Winnie's Winner"	Martha Moran	October 19, 1991
3	"Rapoleon"	Bob Forward and Eve Forward	November 16, 1991
4	"If the Shoe Fits"	Steven Weiss & Paul Dell	November 30, 1991
5	"Nobody's Perfect"	Robert Askin	December 7, 1991
6	"Dropping Out"	Robert Askin	1992
7	"Lights, Camera, Hammer!"	Robert Askin	1992
8	"Blast From the Past"	Robert Askin	1992
9	"Who's Who"	Bob Forward and Eve Forward	1992
10	"Work This!"	Darin Scott	1992

== Critical reception ==
Entertainment Weekly journalist Dalton Ross listed Hammerman at the top of his list "Top 5 Most Ridiculous Things to Be Turned Into a Saturday Morning Cartoon", and described the show as "idiotic".
