= Ray Jewers =

Canadian actor (1945–1993)

- Born: Raymond Jewers; 15 October 1945; Canada
- Died: 3 October 1993 (aged 47)
- Occupation: actor
- Years active: 1977–1993
- Children: Jack Jewers (son)

Ray Jewers (15 October 1945 – 3 October 1993) was a Canadian actor. On stage, he was a member of the cast of several Shakespeare productions, including some with the Royal Shakespeare Company.

== Filmography ==
=== Film ===
- Twilight's Last Gleaming (1977) as Sgt. Domino
- A Bridge Too Far (1977) as U.S. radio operator
- The Spy Who Loved Me (1977) as USS Wayne Crewman
- Valentino (1977) as Electrician
- Jaguar Lives! (1979) as Jessup
- Scum (1979) as Gym Instructor
- Edge of Sanity (1989) as Inspector Newcomen
- The Phantom of the Opera (1989) as Elise

=== Television films ===
- Gulag (1985) as T.V. Interviewer
- The Return of Sherlock Holmes (1987) as Singer
- J.F.K.: Reckless Youth (1993) as Patriotic Man
- Dieppe (1993) as Army Captain
- TekWar (1994) as Bennett Sands
- TekWar: TekLords (1994) as Bennett Sands
- Wild Justice (1994) as Admiral (final film role)

=== Television appearances ===
- Road to Avonlea (1994) as Mr. Ambrose – episode Modern Times
- Dempsey and Makepeace (1985) as Phil Parris – episode Armed and Extremely Dangerous
