= TekLords =

- Also known as: TekWar: TekLords
- Genre: Science Fiction
- Created by: William Shatner
- Written by: Westbrook Claridge; Morgan Gendel; Alfonse Ruggiero; William Shatner
- Directed by: George Bloomfield
- Starring: Greg Evigan; Eugene Clark; Torri Higginson; William Shatner
- Theme music composer: Louis Natale
- Countries of origin: United States; Canada
- Original language: English

Production
- Executive producers: William Shatner; Peter Alan Sussman (as Peter Sussman)
- Producers: Jamie Paul Rock; Stephen Roloff
- Production location: Toronto
- Cinematography: Rodney Charters
- Editor: Dave Goard
- Running time: 96 minutes
- Production company: Universal Television

Original release
- Release: February 20, 1994

TekWar: TekLords is a 1994 TV movie based on a series of books by William Shatner. It is the second TV movie made from the series of books. It aired on 20 February 1994 and is preceded by TekWar (23 January 1994). It was followed by TekWar: TekLab (27 February 1994) and TekWar: TekJustice (14 May 1994).

== Plot ==
Drug lords take over the empire left by convicted Sonny Hokori.

== Cast ==
Actor	Role
Greg Evigan	Jake Cardigan
Eugene Clark	Sid Gomez
Torri Higginson	Beth Kittridge
William Shatner	Walter H. Bascom
Sonja Smits	Kate Cardigan
Ray Jewers	Bennett Sands
Von Flores	Sonny Hokori
Uni Park	Tora Hokori

== See also ==
- TekWar (TV series)
