= Earth: Final Conflict =

American-Canadian television series

- Created by: Gene Roddenberry
- Directed by: David Winning
- Countries of origin: Canada; United States
- Original language: English
- No. of seasons: 5
- No. of episodes: 110 (list of episodes)

Production
- Executive producers: David Kirschner; Majel Barrett-Roddenberry; Richard C. Okie; Seaton McLean
- Running time: 43 minutes
- Production companies: Atlantis Films (1997–1998) (season 1); Alliance Atlantis Communications (1998–2002) (seasons 2–5); Roddenberry/Kirschner Productions; Tribune Entertainment

Original release
- Network: First-run syndication (1997–2002); CTV (1997–1999); NewNet (1999–2002)
- Release: October 6, 1997 – May 20, 2002

Earth: Final Conflict is a science fiction television series based on ideas developed by Gene Roddenberry. The series was produced under the guidance of his widow, Majel Barrett-Roddenberry, who possessed notes kept by Roddenberry that would provide the conceptual basis for the series. It ran for five seasons between October 6, 1997, and May 20, 2002.

== Setting ==
Early in the 21st century, a race of aliens, the Taelons (often referred to as "the Companions"), travel to Earth and take up residence in limited numbers. The Taelons possess highly advanced technologies, many of which they share with humanity, seemingly out of generosity and good will. As a result of these advances, disease, war and pollution are nearly eliminated within three years of their arrival. Despite this, some question whether the Taelons' motives are as benevolent as they appear, and a resistance movement forms to halt the Taelons' ever-growing influence on humanity.

== Development ==
After the cancellation of Star Trek in 1969, its creator Gene Roddenberry began working on other projects, producing scripts and pilot episodes that were shown to various networks, including Genesis II and The Questor Tapes. He began early planning for a project called Battleground: Earth, a science fiction series set in the near future when a group of aliens land on Earth under a banner of peace. Roddenberry wrote the initial for the series in 1976 long before the similarly themed 1983 TV miniseries V.

20th Century Fox Television expressed interest in producing a pilot episode for the series, but Roddenberry's busy schedule prevented it. When the order for the pilot came in, he was in England filming a TV movie, which was followed by work on the Star Trek films and later the TV series Star Trek: The Next Generation. When he died in 1991, Battleground: Earth had yet to be produced.

In the mid-1990s, Roddenberry's widow, Majel Barrett-Roddenberry, began to develop the project. The series was put into production by Atlantis Films and syndicated by Tribune Entertainment with the companies hoping to tap into the blockbuster success of Independence Day. It was renamed Earth: Final Conflict to avoid confusion with L. Ron Hubbard's Battlefield Earth. The success of the show led to the development of one other posthumous Roddenberry project, Andromeda.

=== Alien design ===
For the design of the Taelons, Stephen Roloff referenced Buddha, Bodhisattvas, Ancient Egyptian Pharaohs, Jesus Christ, and other religious and spiritual figures for their humanoid design, while their true form was created using 100% computer-generated imagery provided by Calibre Digital.

== Series ==
The show premiered on October 6, 1997, and ran for five seasons. The finale was broadcast on May 20, 2002.

The show had an unusually high turnover rate among the regular cast, partially due to contractual disagreements between the cast and the producers. Almost all of the show's major characters were killed or otherwise removed within a season or two of being introduced. In fact, the only character to appear as a regular during all five seasons was FBI Agent Ronald Sandoval (Von Flores), one of the show's antagonists.

The fifth season of the show was a radical departure from the storyline of the previous seasons, with the Taelons being replaced by a new and more openly hostile alien race, a group of energy vampires called the Atavus.

== Cast ==
- Kevin Kilner as William Boone, Companion Protector/Resistance agent (season 1; two episodes in season 5)
- Lisa Howard as Lili Marquette, interdimensional shuttle pilot/Resistance agent (seasons 1–2; recurring seasons 3–4)
- Von Flores as Ronald Sandoval, Companion Protector (seasons 1–5)
- Richard Chevolleau as Marcus "Augur" Deveraux, Resistance hacker (seasons 1–3, recurring season 4)
- Leni Parker as Da’an, the North American Companion (seasons 1–4)
- David Hemblen as Jonathan Doors, Resistance leader (seasons 1–3; recurring season 4)
- Robert Leeshock as Liam Kincaid, Companion Protector/Resistance agent (seasons 2–4; the last episode of season 5)
- Anita La Selva as Zo’or, United Nations Companion, later Leader of the Taelon Synod (seasons 2–4; recurring seasons 1 and two episodes of season 5)
- Jayne Heitmeyer as Renee Palmer, Companion business liaison/Resistance agent (seasons 3–5)
- Melinda Deines as Juliet Street, Resistance hacker (seasons 4–5)
- Guylaine St-Onge as Juda, Atavus warrior (season 5)
- Alan van Sprang as Howlyn, Atavus leader (season 5)
- Helen Taylor as Ra’jel, Sire of the Synod (season 5)
- Majel Barrett-Roddenberry as Julianne Belman, Doctor and CVI expert/Resistance agent (season 1; recurring season 2 and 3)

== Synopsis ==
=== Season 1 ===
The story begins three years after the Taelons arrived on Earth. The Taelons have used their advanced technology to help humanity achieve a better quality of life. Nonetheless, the North American Taelon Companion, Da'an, is targeted by an assassin while making a speech. Jonathan Doors, a businessman with close ties to the Taelons, is killed while Da'an is unharmed. Da'an is impressed by Police Commander Boone's work in protecting him from the assassination attempt and offers him a spot as a Taelon Protector, a personal bodyguard and envoy for a particular Taelon.

Boone politely refuses because he wants to start a family with his wife. Deep down, he doesn't trust the Taelons completely. Subsequently, Boone's wife is killed in a mysterious automobile accident and Boone finds out that Jonathan Doors faked his own death so that he could focus on an underground resistance movement that he founded in secret. Boone believes the Taelons have sinister intentions, and wants to find out their true motives. He also believes that the Taelons had something to do with the death of his wife. Because of this, Boone agrees to work as a double agent for the resistance in order to find answers. He accepts Da'an's offer to become a Protector, and receives a Cyber-Viral Implant (CVI) that gives him enhanced mental abilities – including perfect recall. While most CVIs alter the minds of their hosts so they become singularly loyal to the Taelons above all others, including friends, family, and the human race as a whole, the Resistance sees to it that Boone receives a modified CVI that leaves his loyalties the way they were. Agent Boone receives a bioengineered weapon, called a Skrill, that attaches to his arm. Boone is joined by fellow double agent and former Marine Lili Marquette. She is an accomplished pilot of the Taelon shuttlecraft (that can travel in interdimensional space). On the Taelon side, Boone works with another protector, Agent Ronald Sandoval. Sandoval is apparently fully loyal to the Taelons, thanks to his CVI.

Boone soon finds out that Sandoval had Boone's wife killed so that he would join the Taelons. Sandoval explains that his own wife held him back and that he was forced to put her in a mental institution to get her out of the way. He did not want Boone to have the same problem, so he had his wife killed. Boone (who would have been forced to agree if his CVI had not been modified) pretends to understand and continues his duties for the Resistance.

A strange satellite is found in an Amish community. Lili and Boone investigate. In later episodes, the satellite ends up in the Resistance base. It has the ability to make replicants and later kills a Resistance scientist. The probe later winds up in the hands of the Taelons.

Boone introduces Lili to Marcus Deveraux, a technical genius and computer hacker better known by the nickname "Augur," whom Boone often hires when he needs technical skills. Later Lili and Boone become acquainted with Jonathan Doors's state-of-the-art base for the Resistance. They learn that Augur was actually a member of the Resistance all along.

Boone continues to search for the true motives of the Taelons and actually becomes good friends with Da'an, a spiritual and very charismatic being who seems to personally hold humans in high regard. A less sympathetic Taelon named Zo'or is introduced. Boone finds out that a Taelon named Ma'el visited Earth centuries ago and predicted that humanity would one day be equal to the Taelons. Sandoval meets an Irish Protector, Siobhan Beckett, who seems to fancy him.

Sandoval's CVI malfunctions and frees him of Taelon control. He saves his wife from the mental institution but comes close to death. The Resistance captures the couple, and Boone convinces Doors to return Sandoval to the Taelons and give Sandoval's wife safe passage. While Sandoval is made to believe that Boone killed his wife to make him feel the same pain he inflicted upon Boone, before he is reimplanted and feels nothing again.

The Taelons order an investigation into a psychic invasion of their commonality, leading Boone and the resistance to learn that Ma'el gave humans psychic abilities so they would have a chance to be seen as equals when Taelons and humans met again.

The resistance successfully infects the Taelon headquarters in Washington with a computer virus, which unexpectedly spreads through Taelon technology world-wide, leading to a threat to human technology that is connected to Taelon technology. Boone and Sandoval work to destroy the virus. An enormous mothership appears in the skies, before disappearing in inter-dimensional space.

Boone discovers more Taelon experiments performed on humans while they are traveling through a new, world-wide, inter-dimensional travel system. Some humans are given an implant similar to a CVI, while others, including his sister, are used for some unknown breeding experiment. The continued use and function of this travel system appears to be another point of contention between Da’an and Zo’or.

A virus is extracted from the strange probe for testing. It is highly contagious and communicable between Taelons and humans. White supremacists steal a sample of the virus and unleash it in a housing center, affecting the entire surrounding area. A cure is discovered, but not before hundreds are killed.

The fiancé of the resistance scientist killed by the previously mentioned probe becomes determined to find a way to get his love back. The Resistance breaks into a Taelon installation in which the probe is located. The scientist gets his fiancée back at the cost of his own life. The probe is supposedly destroyed.

An ancient Taelon pod is discovered to have landed in Earth's past, and inside is an enemy of the Taelons named Ha'gel. Ha'gel is of the Kimera species which the Taelons had apparently wronged millennia ago. Ha'gel has the power to temporarily assume other forms, leaving his victims temporarily incapacitated. Ha'gel steals Sandoval's form and impregnates Siobhan Beckett. Boone tries to confront the alien but Ha'gel is frightened. Boone is badly wounded and Ha'gel is killed. Boone is in critical condition, as Beckett goes into labor while in the custody of the Resistance. Zo'or seemingly vaporizes Boone's body.

=== Season 2 ===
Beckett gives birth as the Resistance is saddened by the news that Boone has died. The protector's baby is a Kimeran/human hybrid and grows at a rapid rate. He takes the name "Liam Kincaid" and immediately takes action as an adult. Beckett's memory is wiped and she is sent back to the Taelons. The recovered fiancée is really a replicant of the mysterious probe, which is from another alien race known as the Jaridians. The probe replicant kills the leader of the Taelon Synod. Liam saves Da'an and is recruited to become his new protector. Liam joins the Resistance but doesn't get along with Doors. Lili is forced to work under Sandoval but continues her double agent duties. Zo'or becomes the new Taelon leader, with Sandoval becoming his personal protector.

Da'an realizes who and what Liam is but keeps his secret, and the two become good friends. Da'an and Zo'or battle over each other's ideologies. Zo'or believes humans should serve the Taelons, while Da'an thinks humanity is worthy of being their equals. The Taelons prepare Earth for war with the Jaridians, who believe humans have sided with the Taelons.

Augur's experiments accidentally sever Da’an's connection to the Commonality, causing him to revert to a primitive state the Taelons call an Atavus. Zo’or orders Da’an's death, claiming he is a threat to the Synod and that Da’an will never be able to rejoin the Commonality. Liam is able to reconnect Da’an to the Commonality, restoring his physical form.

Zo’or tries to destroy the Liberation by manipulating human brain waves, but a lucky trip through a time-portal gives Liam the hints he needs to prevent it.

An attempt by Doors to have Liam killed results in Liam and Augur being cast into a parallel dimension, where they see humanity without the influence of Ma’al. They return with Maya, who was Kayla's (Lili's) sister and Jason's (Sandoval's) wife in her dimension.

Augur is arrested in Russia and sentenced to death. A Taelon representative, Lazarus, recruits him for an experimental procedure to create super-soldiers. Lazarus regains his memories, restores Augur's memories then attempts a coup on the Taelon mothership.

The Resistance finds out that the CVI's motivational imperative wears off after a time, leaving the protectors restored to their own wills. Liam senses that the CVI of his mother, long-serving Protector Siobhan Beckett, has malfunctioned and attempts to locate her. Beckett has to deal internally with all the wrongs she has committed while in an altered mental state. Also concerned, Zo'or sends Sandoval to locate Beckett, but Liam locates her first. He joins his dying mother and shares with her energetically/telepathically revealing his true origin. She realizes who he is as she passes away.

Doors decides to take the Resistance above ground and runs for president. The Resistance members are pardoned in a deal Doors is able to make.

Sandoval becomes intrigued by Maya, and begins a search for her. She begins to suffer from being in the wrong dimension. Her counterpart in this dimension, Isabel, is tracked down. Lili discovers Isabel is her half-sister from her father's secret life. Maya and Isabel are united so the two can merge and both survive in one body. The dead body is left for Sandoval to find, to discourage him from pursuing Maya/Isabel any more.

A Jaridian soldier escapes from the Taelon mothership, taking Lili hostage. Liam pursues them through inter-dimensional space, and the three are stranded on a Kimera station. After navigating their way to the heart of the station, Liam lets the Jaridian go and reports his demise on the station to Sandoval and Zo'or.

Chandler and his stolen shuttle reappear to attempt an attack on a Taelon embassy.

Teens are being recruited to become front line soldiers in the Taelon war. Da’an recalls the soldiers after threatening to betray Zo’or's plans to the humans.

Former Resistance members come to Lili and Augur concerned over humanity's protection. The Resistance is reformed under Liam's leadership. Da'an warns Liam that reforming the Resistance is a bad idea, but decides not to betray them to the Synod.

A Taelon crashes on Earth, claiming to be sympathetic to the humans. He claims the entire plan the Taelons have for humanity was conceived by Da’an.

Augur is hired to help complete a weapon called the Forge to use against the Jaridians. Liam and Da’an disagree about the weapon.

A Jaridian probe crashes on Earth after taking a partial hit from the Taelons. The resistance finds it, but are captured before they begin to examine it. After finding a black ops group that is also preparing to survive whatever the Taelons may bring, they cooperate to examine the probe, and discover it is a message probe with plans for an advanced communications device, with an offer from the Jaridians to cooperate to defeat the Taelons.

Zo'or sets the Resistance and Doors up when he has an assassination attempt made on President Thompson. Thompson survives and declares martial law. The Resistance members are targeted and many are brought to the Taelon Mothership. Liam and Augur try to rescue Doors but are pinned down. Lili tries to destroy the mothership in a last-ditch effort to save Earth.

=== Season 3 ===
Lili's plan backfires and she is believed dead, and exposed as a traitor to the Taelons. Liam and Augur are rescued by a Volunteer (a human foot soldier who has been augmented to a lesser degree than a Protector). Doors, on the other hand, is captured. Doors is able to cut a deal with Zo'or to give himself freedom while ensuring that his company can secretly resist the Taelons. The Volunteer is really one of his people, Renee Palmer, the new CEO of Doors International. Martial law is repealed and many of the Resistance members are returned. Lili is revealed to be alive, but in secret captivity, under Sandoval's control. He alters her DNA and sends her off into deep space. Liam and Augur continue to lead the resistance.

Though Doors proceeds to do work separately from the Resistance, Renee and Liam find their interests frequently overlapping, and occasionally assist each other. Their relationship gradually develops into a close partnership. At the same time, Da'an and Liam's relationship becomes strained, as Zo'or continues his ambitious plans from his position of leadership. Meanwhile, Sandoval seems to be working towards a clandestine agenda of his own, as he begins concealing information from the Taelons. Unbeknownst to anyone else, Lili arrives at the alien planet Sandoval sent her to, but because her perception is being altered, she does not realize this. The alien planet turns out to be the homeworld of the Jaridians, and Lili is tricked into delivering Taelon Inter-Dimensional (ID) travel technology to their leaders.

After the illusion ends, she realizes that she is in fact, on Jaridia, and is horrified once she figures out that the ID drives she unwittingly gave her new captors, are exactly what they needed to invade Earth. Time passes back on Earth, during which it is revealed that Zo'or is Da'an's child, Jonathan Doors dies saving his son, and Renee continues to work with Liam. Lili eventually leaves Jaridia, bound for Earth, with a Jaridian named Vorjack, whose half-human, half-Jaridian child she is carrying. Their arrival complicates the plans of both the Taelons and the Resistance, particularly as Vorjack struggles with the atmospheric conditions on Earth. As the new hybrid baby is about to be born, Liam and Renee help Lili through a difficult delivery.

=== Season 4 ===
Da'an helps to make sure that the Human/Jaridian hybrid lives. The Jaridians are dying, and Vorjack had hoped that the child would hold the key to their salvation, but this does not happen as expected. Before Vorjack dies from being on Earth for too long for his body to handle, Liam thinks quickly and saves his life. Lili, the Jaridian, and their hybrid child, manage to escape as Liam wishes them well.

Augur runs into trouble with the law and is forced into hiding. He offers his friend Juliet Street, a.k.a. J.Street, the opportunity to take over his role in the Resistance, and she accepts. She proves savvy and intelligent, eventually revealing that she has the rare ability to think and calculate in multiple dimensions, which makes her a target for the increasingly desperate Taelons.

The Resistance goes above ground once again when Renee and Liam team up with an international group, the Atlantic National Alliance, dedicated to defending human interests against the Taelons.

Toward the end of the season, it is discovered that the Taelons are a dying race as well; their core energy is almost spent. More and more Taelons are entering stasis, and Zo'or becomes increasingly desperate to save his species.

Liam and Renee discover a regeneration chamber hidden deep in a volcano, set in place long ago by Ma'el. Liam realizes that all species are interconnected and he must play a role in saving the Taelons, despite all the trouble they have caused. He brings them out of stasis. To conserve energy, they combine their essence into just six Taelons who go down to the regeneration chamber. At the same time, the remainder of Vorjack's Jaridian fleet arrives on the scene. Zo'or, greedy to ensure his own survival, touches an energy pool in the chamber and is absorbed into it. Liam convinces the Jaridians to attempt a "joining" with the Taelons, which, it is believed, will return them to an earlier evolutionary form that is better suited to survival. As the volcano erupts, the joining procedure begins with Liam's help, but it is unclear who or what will survive.

=== Season 5 ===
Liam, the Taelons, and the Jaridians have disappeared but their efforts, far from saving everyone, have doomed the galaxy: they have awakened a version of the Atavus protospecies, a race of energy vampires that preceded the Taelons and Jaridians. Renee and Street are the only ones who know the truth of what's happening: the Resistance is disbanded and the human governments are in no rush to accept the beginning of another war with an alien race. Their only ally is Raj'el, the first and now the last of the Taelons, who is forced to provide covert support from the heart of the Taelon mothership.

To make matters worse, Sandoval, left in control of the Taelon mothership, allies with the Atavus leaders Howlyn and Juda. Together, they are able to keep their presence hidden for much of the season. Their plan is to create an army of Atavus-Human hybrids by means of a joining process, then use the hybrids to awaken other Atavus hives hidden around the world.

As the season progresses, a few familiar faces re-enter the fight: William Boone is brought back as a trap for Renee, but he quickly joins her side. In response, Sandoval and Howlyn revive Zo'or, giving him a new body as a female Atavus, but Renee and Boone are able to defeat their nemesis once and for all.

Final Conflict comes to a head when Liam returns to help Renee stop Howlyn from unleashing his elite warriors from the long-buried Atavus mothership. At the end of the series, Liam, Renee and Raj'el depart in the Taelon mothership, resolving to bring the few trustworthy Atavus home and indulge in a little adventure along the way.

== Broadcasting ==
The series was first shown on CTV in 1997 and ran for two seasons until the network decided to cancel it due to low ratings. The show was, however, resurrected by CHUM Limited and was moved to their NewNet network for the remainder of its run. The series was broadcast in syndication in the United States.

The series has been re-shown daily on Bravo, and later by Horror, in the United Kingdom, Showcase in Canada, Jimmy in Italy, and Bangladesh Television in Bangladesh. In 2024, it is available on Tubi in the U.S. The series aired in the Republic of Ireland on RTÉ Two from 22 March 1999 to 2005.

Currently, September 2026, the series is streaming on Amazon Prime Video.

== Home media ==
=== Region 1 ===
ADV Films released seasons three, four, and five on DVD in 2003. Due to different companies owning different rights for different seasons, these were the only seasons they were able to negotiate the distribution rights for. The episodes are presented in uncropped 16x9 widescreen on six discs per season. There were only minimal extras.

On May 5, 2009, Universal Studios Home Entertainment released Season One on DVD in the US. The episodes are presented in 4x3 full-screen on five discs with a small handful of extras included. The episodes appear uncut but are time compressed, running at a slightly faster pace, resulting in each episode running approximately two minutes shorter than in their original unaltered forms. On July 27, 2010, Season Two was released on DVD in the US.

Alliance Home Entertainment has released all five seasons on DVD in Canada. All of these are bare-bones releases, no extras at all and are presented in 4x3 full-screen on six discs per season with both English and French audio tracks. Season One is presented at its original pacing.

=== Regions 2 and 4 ===
Universal Pictures UK released the first season on DVD in the UK on April 3, 2006.

Pandastorm Pictures started to release the series in Germany on May 29, 2015. Season 2 followed on September 18, 2015. Season 3 followed on January 29, 2016, Season 4 on April, 15th, 2016 On February 4, 2019, the German publisher Pandastorm Pictures had to announce via their Facebook page, that so far it was impossible to find all of the rights holders for Earth: Final Conflict – season five – it is quite likely by now, that they will not be able to publish season five in Germany. They announced the release of Series 1 and Series 2 as region free, sound: German DD 2.0, English DD 2.0 and subtitles: English.

Via Vision Entertainment has released all five seasons on DVD in Australia.

DVD Name	Release dates				
DVD Name	Region 1	Region 1 (CAN)	Region 2	Region 2 (DE)	Region 4
The Complete 1st Season	May 5, 2009	June 29, 2010	April 3, 2006	May 29, 2015	December 6, 2006
The Complete 2nd Season	July 27, 2010	July 27, 2010	—N/a	September 18, 2015	April 1, 2009
The Complete 3rd Season	August 5, 2003	August 31, 2010	—N/a	January 29, 2016	July 1, 2009
The Complete 4th Season	September 16, 2003	September 28, 2010	—N/a	April 15, 2016	March 10, 2010
The Complete 5th Season	October 28, 2003	October 26, 2010	—N/a	—N/a	September 1, 2010
