= List of TekWar episodes =

TekWar is a North American television series based on the TekWar novels written by William Shatner and developed for television by Stephen Roloff. The series followed Jake Cardigan, a former police officer turned private investigator working for Cosmos, a private security firm owned and operated by Walter Bascom.

== Series overview ==
Season	Episodes	Originally aired		DVD release date			
Season	Episodes	Season premiere	Season finale	Region 1 (US)	Region 1 (CAN)	Region 2	Region 4
1	4	January 17, 1994	May 9, 1994	—N/a	May 24, 2011	—N/a	—N/a
2	18	December 22, 1994	February 9, 1996	June 10, 2008	April 20, 2004	—N/a	—N/a

== Episodes ==
=== Season 1 (1994) ===
No. overall	No. in series	Title	Directed by	Written by	Canadian air date	U.S. air date
1	1	"TekWar" "TekWar: The Movie"	William Shatner	Alfonse Ruggiero, Jr. & Westbrook Claridge	January 25, 1994	January 17, 1994
Police officer Jake Cardigan has been framed by an unknown enemy and imprisoned in suspended animation for dealing in "Tek" and for the murder of his fellow officers. After serving only four years of his 15-year sentence, Cardigan is released where he finds his wife and son are gone. As he sets off to track them down, his former partner, Sid Gomez, reveals that his release was arranged by Walter Bascom, the head of the Cosmos Security. In return for his help in locating a missing scientist, Bascom agrees to help Cardigan clear his name. Sheena Easton guest-stars as Warbride, an environmental revolutionary and old lover of Cardigan's.
2	2	"TekLords"	George Bloomfield	Story by : Alfonse Ruggiero, Jr. & Westbrook Claridge; Teleplay by : Alfonse Ruggiero, Jr. & Westbrook Claridge & Morgan Gendel	February 24, 1994	February 14, 1994
When Inspector Winterguild is found in a coma, Bascom has Beth Kittridge search computer records which show that the last thing Winterguild saw while in the Cyber-Matrix was the image of TekLord Sonny Hokori's long-dead sister, Tora. Cardigan traces the computer virus that caused the image to a computer hacker who is under TekLord Hokori's orders. It is only a matter of time before the virus attacks the entire city's Cyber-Matrix.
3	3	"TekLab"	Timothy Bond	Story by : Westbrook Claridge; Teleplay by : Chris Haddock	March 1, 1994	February 21, 1994
Jake Cardigan and Sid Gomez attend a gala at the Tower of London which marks the start of a campaign to restore the British monarchy. The festivities are disturbed, however, when the aging Prince Albert is found murdered and the sword Excalibur stolen. Prince Richard accepts the support of the Monarchist Party to become King but the thief who stole Excalibur vows Richard will never reach the throne. Suspecting the involvement of Tek gangs, Sid and Jake follow the sword's trail to Westminster Abbey and are taken prisoner and they soon discover that the Monarchist Party is supported by the TekLords and with them, Prince Richard plans to reign over an evil Tek empire.
4	4	"TekJustice" "TekJustice: The Final Showdown"	Jerry Ciccoritti	Story by : Morgan Gendel; Teleplay by : Jim Macak	May 19, 1994	May 9, 1994
Jake Cardigan is arrested for the murder of his ex-wife's husband. He confesses and refuses to assist his lawyer, Eugene Leopold, in his own defense. A quick scan of the police files show that he is covering for the real killer, his own son, Danny Cardigan. A re-examination of forensic evidence soon proves that neither Jake nor Danny are responsible for the murder. Jake Cardigan and Sid Gomez realise that Tek Lord Sonny Hokori is responsible and vow to bring him to justice. Sandahl Bergman guest-stars as Valkyrie, Sonny Hokori's bodyguard.

=== Season 2 (1994–1996) ===
No. overall	No. in series	Title	Directed by	Written by	Canadian air date	U.S. air date
5	1	"Sellout"	William Shatner	Story by : Morgan Gendel & Westbrook Claridge & Clifton Campbell; Teleplay by : Richard Manning & Hans Beimler	December 22, 1994	January 16, 1995
Marty Dollar is a television mogul who owns an interactive cable-shopping network that rakes in millions. Claiming that he's also a humanitarian who wants to stamp out Tek use, he hires scientist Beth Kittridge to come up with a way of making Tek non-addictive. However, Dollar is merely using her for his own devious plans. She'll have to synthesize diphenarine, the addictive substance in Tek, in order to experiment. Dollar plans to put the diphenarine into the music players he sells over the air, turning millions into addicts and creating a world of demand for a product only he can sell.
6	2	"Unknown Soldier"	Allan Kroeker	Robin Jill Bernheim	December 29, 1994	January 7, 1995
Electra is an attractive young woman and a military veteran who was turned into an "X-Class Soldier", a biologically enhanced "killing machine" with subcutaneous armor implants and cybernetically-augmented strength. After Electra assists Jake in a fight, he helps her get a job at Cosmos. Jake does not suspect that, by night, Electra is using her skills to assassinate those she believes are responsible for the atrocities of the war and the massacre of her fellow soldiers.
7	3	"Tek Posse"	George Bloomfield	Richard Manning & Hans Beimler	January 5, 1995	January 9, 1995
Clean-cut, charismatic ex-attorney general John Grant creates a military SWAT team to hunt down Teklords. Informally dubbed the Tek Posse, it has a powerful new tool – a prototype mind prober that can act as a super lie-detector and confession-inducer. Grant recruits Jake away from Cosmos to join the elite Tek Posse. However, after an innocent civilian is accidentally killed during a raid, Jake begins to suspect that Grant's "door-kicking, no-warrant-needed, brute force" means aren't justified by the ends.
8	4	"Promises To Keep"	Allan Kroeker	James Kahn	January 12, 1995	January 23, 1995
Beth Kittridge gets a call for help from Tom Weston – the lost love of her life, who has been presumed dead for five years. Tom has stayed in hiding because his research has led him close to a means of eliminating Tek and, for this reason, the Teklords want him dead. Jake has to come to terms with his feelings for Beth and ultimately let her go where both her heart and sense of duty lead her.
9	5	"Stay of Execution"	Allan Kroeker	Marc Scott Zicree	January 19, 1995	January 30, 1995
Terrorist Alec Seeger has managed to take control of Weathercon, the global weather control system, and is threatening to unleash deadly storms unless his demands are met. Jake is drafted to help in the manhunt for Alec, and is paired with Lianna Cruz, a former terrorist comrade of Alec's who has been serving out a prison sentence in the "freezer." If Lianna cooperates, the government will reduce her sentence. Their mission is to follow a lead to Yeltsingrad and use Lianna's knowledge of the city and Alec's other ex-comrades to find him. As they race against the clock, Jake has to find out whether Lianna is on his side or simply setting him up for a fall.
10	6	"Alter Ego"	Ken Girotti	David Bennett Carren & J. Larry Carroll	March 2, 1995	February 6, 1995
Miles Connor, a powerful Teklord busted by Jake and Sid, has been sent into cryogenic incarceration for his crimes. However, Connor soon reappears in person and begins killing those responsible for putting him away. When Jake and Sid check the freezer to see if Connor has escaped, they find that he is indeed still in prison. They discover that the new Connor is a computer program, an artificial intelligence personality simulation that the "real" Connor developed in order to maintain his empire. The program, having inherited Connor's ambition, ruthlessness and desire for revenge, proves to be far deadlier than any human opponent.
11	7	"Killer Instinct"	Stefan Scaini	Barry M. Schkolnick	March 9, 1995	February 20, 1995
A street cop is gunned down in cold blood by a clean-cut teenage boy. His father blames a controversial and ultra-violent interactive virtual-reality game in which cops and Tek Lords battle for supremacy. The game's manufacturer denies responsibility for the killings. He claims that it is merely a game, and he can't help it if a few lunatics are going off the deep end. Jake and Sid soon discover that an unknown hacker has introduced a virus into the game to incite violent acts. Worse still, the game is only the beginning. The virus also shows up on the Adway and even on the police network, pushing normal people to commit enraged, destructive acts. Jake must find the hacker before his own exposure to the virus pushes him over the edge.
12	8	"Chill Factor"	Bruce Pittman	Robin Jill Bernheim	March 30, 1995	February 27, 1995
Lowell, a convicted felon who is about to be "frozen," injects himself with an inactive, non-virulent form of a deadly virus. The freezer's computer, believing a real infection is underway, automatically aborts Lowell's incarceration and "unfreezes" several other convicts to whom the virus has spread via the cry-support systems. Lowell, mobilizing these other convicts, takes the warden and several observers hostage. Unknown to Lowell, the freezer's computer has recently been upgraded to assume complete control of security and is attempting to neutralize the virus by sterilizing the facility and killing everyone inside. Jake Cardigan, who is one of the hostages, must convince the others that their only hope for survival is to fake death by entering cryogenic freeze at a level deep enough to fool the computer into thinking they have died. However, at such a deep level of cryofreeze, the terrifying communal freezer nightmares will also be intensified and Jake and the others will have to endure hellish hallucinations that can literally kill them with their own fear.
13	9	"Deadline"	Allan Kroeker	J. Larry Carroll & David Bennett Carren	April 6, 1995	March 27, 1995
Police android Winger is attacked by an assailant who steals his Cortical Relay Unit, a critical biochip, from his brain. Without the CRU, Winger's brain will deteriorate and he'll die within 18 hours. Winger cannot replace the biochip since a new law, "The Thornton Act," has outlawed the production of new androids and their replacement parts. Since the police force's policy is to phase out androids, he can't reveal the truth to them. Instead, he hires adversary Jake Cardigan to find his assailant and recover his CRU. In his search for Winger's assailant, Jake is continuously hampered by news commentator and media demagogue Gerald Rhodes, who is an avid anti-android activist and follower of the late Senator John Thornton. Rhodes is on a crusade, convinced that Thornton was killed by an android in revenge for his anti-android legislation. As he races against time to save Winger's life, Jake discovers that the most likely suspects are innocent while the most unlikely are guilty and, Rhodes campaign is different than it appears to be.
14	10	"Carlotta's Room"	Bruce Pittman	James Kahn	April 13, 1995	April 8, 1995
Jake is approached by his politician friend David Lane, who has been frequenting a brothel and has fallen in love with Carlotta, one of the prostitutes. Carlotta is supposedly a virtual reality prostitute, an interactive computer-generated program of a woman. However, David is convinced that Carlotta is not a creation of virtual reality technology; she is just too realistic. He believes that Carlotta is a real woman who is somehow being held prisoner and forced into virtual reality sex, transmitted by remote. When David approaches the brothel's madame to buy the "Carlotta" program, the madame refuses and instead attempts to blackmail David to vote affirmative on an upcoming cyber-property bill. A desperate David has turned to Jake as a last resort. Then, when David is murdered, Jake takes on the strange case in earnest and uncovers the sad story of Carlotta who, although not exactly a computer image, is not exactly the imprisoned woman David had in mind.
15	11	"Deep Cover"	Allan Kroeker	Robin Jill Bernheim	June 10, 1995	June 10, 1995
Cassandra Del Amo and her brothers Ian and Michael, the remaining members of a once powerful mob family, are determined to reign once more and by gaining access to a deadly nuclear arsenal, they'll have the tools to consolidate the Tek industry and rule again. The Del Amo organization is tight and Cassandra's favorite tool, a deadly mind-probe, makes it virtually impossible for outsiders to penetrate. Sam Houston, the newest member of Cosmos and Jake's new partner, agrees to infiltrate the family by allowing herself to undergo mind-sculpting, the only known method around the mind probe. Implanted with an alpha-wave oscillator which stimulates her dormant personality with a new personality, Sam becomes Sabrina Daniels, an outlaw whose father once worked for the Del Amos. Planted in a jail cell with the recently incarcerated Michael Del Amo, Sam ingratiates herself into the family by helping Michael escape and soon becomes Cassandra's protege. When a leak within the police department blows her cover, the Del Amos destroy the oscillator that keeps her true identity in check and Jake must race against time to keep from losing Sam forever.
16	12	"Cyberhunt"	Allan Eastman	Richard Manning & Hans Beimler	June 17, 1995	June 17, 1995
Nika finds herself on the other side of the law when an old friend from her renegade days lures her into using her expert hacker skills to locate and claim a long-lost shipment of bullion hidden in cyberspace. When Nika gets too deeply involved, Jake must defy orders to save his friend from the government, an underworld crime lord and the shipment itself. Nika feels that her expert hacker skills are taken for granted at Cosmos Security and becomes enticed when Fab, her former partner-in-crime, gives her the ultimate challenge: find a long-lost shipment of bullion hidden in cyberspace. Nika accepts the challenge but soon discovers that she has violated Government Special Services cyberspace and is considered a felon. Meanwhile, Carlyle Rossi, a terrifying underworld figure keeps a close watch on Nika and plans to let her find the shipment so he can claim it. Jake desperately tries to get Nika to trust him in order to save her from the government, the crime-lords and the shipment itself, which carries with it hidden danger.
17	13	"Zero Tolerance"	Allan Kroeker	David Bennett Carren & J. Larry Carroll	June 24, 1995	June 24, 1995
Jake is contacted by a mysterious man named Peter who praises him for his efforts in the war against Tek. Sensing a connection between his mystery caller and the recent deaths of two Teklords, Jake soon discovers that Peter, together with his sister Rachel, has concocted a potion that rapidly kills anyone who has ever used Tek. Although diabolical Teklords are the initial victims of this potion, Jake quickly realizes its dire implications. Asked to join in their cause, Jake, a former Tek user, must tread carefully as he tries to unravel Peter and Rachel's twisted plot before it ensures death of millions of innocent citizens.
18	14	"Forget Me Not"	Ken Girotti	James Kahn	July 1, 1995	July 1, 1995
A dazed Jake awakens from an alley bruised and bloodied and shows up at Cosmos with a significant memory loss. A doctor reveals to Jake that his memories have been extracted and that in a short time his brain will essentially short-circuit. Nika manages to identify a man named Artie as another victim of memory extraction. Jake and Sam pay Artie a visit and discover that although he is slow, he has total recall and has received many of Jake's memories as well as those of other people. Jake soon realizes that he, in turn, now has some of Artie's memories. Jake gets to the bottom of this mystery and finds out that during his term in cryogenic prison, the memories of the cellmates were inadvertently shared. All of those memories were then downloaded into Artie by Hermano Lobo, a fellow inmate, so he can locate a hidden shipment of solid rocket fuel. Jake must prevent Lobo from getting to the shipment and regain his memory before its too late.
19	15	"The Gate"	Bruce Pittman	Marc Scott Zicree	January 20, 1996	January 20, 1996
Feeling stressed by parental expectations and academic pressures, Dan and his best friend Peter take a break from their studies and follow a mysterious girl named Tina to a party. Tina lures Peter into a portal where he dons a headset and disappears. Jake is rebuffed by Dan when he tries to help him find Peter. On his own, Dan locates Tina, wears the headset and disappears just as Peter did. Dan arrives at a self-contained "Utopia-like" environment where he meets Tina and Peter. Although this world looks real to them, they are, in fact in a comatose state and dreaming the experience. Dr. Golden, the creator of this cybersphere, escapes before Jake can confront her. Jake and Sam soon discover that Dr. Golden is using the teenagers' minds to fuel an advanced computer and that it will eventually kill them. Faced with the prospect of losing his son, Jake risks his own life and enters the cybersphere, even though there may not be a way out.
20	16	"Skin Deep"	Hans Beimler	Dean Butler	January 27, 1996	January 27, 1996
Jake can't believe it when Sharon Neville, a love lost many years ago, walks back into his life only to report her own murder. He's even more skeptical when she turns out to be a professional identity double who says the killer was none other than Sharon's husband, Police Commissioner Bob Neville and that Sharon was murdered because she had evidence he was dealing Tek. When Sharon's body is found, Jake realizes the woman is telling the truth and goes after Neville. However, the Police Commissioner is one step ahead of him and uses his position and power to frame Jake for Sharon's murder. On the run from the police, Jake must turn to Sam to help prove his innocence and prevent Neville from releasing a massive shipment of Tek into the city.
21	17	"Redemption"	Bruce Pittman	J. Larry Carroll & David Bennett Carren & Robin Jill Bernheim	February 2, 1996	February 3, 1996
Bascom orders a reluctant Jake to provide security for Frank Avery, a former mayor and Tek addict who is running for re- election. Jake, an admitted cynic who mistrusts politicians and Tek users, is slowly "won over" by Avery after the candidate saves a suicidal Tek Head and upon witnessing his daughter Gwen's genuine devotion to her father. Meanwhile, the Teklords have sent in Trask, known as "the fixer," to foil Avery's campaign and ensure a victory for their figurehead candidate Kyle Brackett. Jake and Sam realize that Avery is being set up by someone with an advanced morph mask and frantically search for a nullifier to reveal his identity. Time runs short as the polls continue to shift in Brackett's favor, and a mole within Avery's campaign tries to have him killed.
22	18	"Betrayal"	William Shatner	Lisabeth Shatner	February 9, 1996	February 10, 1996
While monitoring an illegal weapons shipment at Teklord Julian Lambert's hideout, Jake and Sam find themselves in the middle of an ambush. Someone leaked information about the bust to Lambert. Suspecting a spy in their midst, Bascom hires security specialist Jeffrey Spader to plug any leaks that may be coming from inside Cosmos. Spader has carte blanche to keep an eye on everyone's activities and he's paying particular attention to Jake who, coincidentally, has been at the scene of every bust that's gone awry. He even knows that Jake has been having recurring nightmares, a side effect of his days spent in the freezer, and has been seeing therapist Janet Blake. When the subject of a security trace requested by Jake turns up dead, Spader figures Jake as the leak. And when Spader is found murdered after an altercation with Jake, even Bascom has a hard time believing Jake's innocence. Unbeknownst to Jake, he's become a pawn in a deadly game.
