= TekWar =

Series of science fiction novels by William Shatner and Ron Goulart

- Created by: William Shatner
- Original work: TekWar

Print publications
- Comics: TekWorld

Films and television
- Television series: TekWar

Games
- Video game: William Shatner's TekWar

TekWar is a series of science fiction novels created by Canadian actor William Shatner, ghost-written by American writer Ron Goulart, and published by Putnam beginning in October 1989. The novels gave rise to a comic book series, video game, and later TV movies and a series, both of the latter featuring Shatner.

== Premise ==
The 22nd century universe is centered on "Tek"—an illegal, addictive, mind-altering digital drug in the form of a microchip. The drug creates a simulated reality (and in the films and TV series taps into "the matrix" hyperspace). In the later novels, a new version called "SuperTek" has improved efficiency, is less likely to cause brain damage in users, and features a shared reality, similar to the TV version's "matrix". The protagonist, Jake Cardigan, is a former police officer framed for dealing the drug four years prior to the start of the first novel. Having been sentenced to 15 years' cryo-imprisonment, Cardigan's parole and release are arranged by Walt Bascom, the head of private investigation firm Cosmos, who uncovered the frame-up, thereby proving Cardigan's innocence. In return Bascom wishes to employ him as an expert in a series of Tek-related crimes, mostly in Greater Los Angeles, referred to as "GLA". In the first few novels Cardigan is portrayed as a recovering Tek-user with several lapses, but this aspect diminishes as the novels progress—in the first book Gomez comments that 70% of users relapse, while it is implied in later novels that to break the addiction for even a light user is impossible.

Partnered with Sid Gomez, the two form a good cop, bad cop partnership with Cardigan's past continually being brought up as a foil for his new career—most honest people he meets distrust him, and most dishonest people attempt to kill him for perceived slights in the drug trade. However, the two prove an effective team and stay a core duo throughout the series, with input from informants, employees of both Cosmos, other detective agencies, and Cardigan's son Dan and his girlfriend Molly—both of whom are enrolled in the GLA police academy and as such have access to police files through their own informant.

The 22nd century is populated with artificial intelligence such as integrated computer systems and "andies" which range from obvious metal robots to highly sophisticated simulacra, some of which are accurate enough to deceive an observer into thinking they are human. A later plot device is the use of "kamikaze" andies that are designed to be realistic enough to get close to their target, whereupon they explode—killing their target and destroying themselves and as such any evidence that could be traced back to the controller.

Each novel covers a specific case; all are Tek-related, but most include sub-plots which involve non-Tek issues and travel out of the GLA, occasionally to other countries or as far as orbiting satellites. A shadowy government agency known as OCO—the Office of Clandestine Operations—is a frequent antagonist in the novels, albeit usually keeping to the background and supporting the particular novel's villain.

== Background ==
Shatner began to write notes that would become the novels on the set of Star Trek V: The Final Frontier, with the original book an attempt to blend elements from Star Trek and his 1980s police drama T. J. Hooker.

In a 1989 interview Shatner explained how he developed the concept, main characters and basic story outlines. These notes were developed in collaboration with Goulart, who wrote the final manuscript.

== Novels ==
1. TekWar (1989) ISBN 0-399-13495-6
2. TekLords (1991) ISBN 0-399-13616-9
3. TekLab (1991) ISBN 0-399-13736-X
4. Tek Vengeance (1993) ISBN 0-399-13788-2
5. Tek Secret (1993) ISBN 0-399-13892-7
6. Tek Power (1994) ISBN 0-399-13997-4
7. Tek Money (1995) ISBN 0-399-14109-X
8. Tek Kill (1996) ISBN 0-399-14202-9
9. Tek Net (1997) ISBN 0-399-14339-4

== Comic book series ==
In 1992, TekWar was adapted into a comic book series.

A new TekWar comic book adaptation, entitled The Tek War Chronicles, by Shatner and comic book writer Scott Davis with art by Erich Owen and colors by Michelle Davies, was released by Bluewater Productions on June 24, 2009. As of 2010, The Tek War Chronicles is available digitally exclusively through Devil's Due Digital.

=== Trading cards ===
Trading cards with comic book artwork were published by Cardz in 1993.

== Television films and series ==
The TekWar novels became a television franchise with TV films in 1994, then a series.

TV movies
Title	Original airdate	Runtime
TekWar	January 17, 1994	97 minutes
TekLords	February 20, 1994	96 minutes
TekWar: TekLab	February 27, 1994	105 minutes
TekWar: TekJustice	May 14, 1994	100 minutes

The first three were adaptations of the books, while TekJustice was an original movie.

TekWar TV series
Episode no.	Episode title	Original airdate
1	"Sellout"	December 22, 1994
2	"Unknown Soldier"	December 29, 1994
3	"Tek Posse"	January 5, 1995
4	"Promises to Keep"	January 12, 1995
5	"Stay of Execution"	January 19, 1995
6	"Alter Ego"	March 2, 1995
7	"Killer Instinct"	March 9, 1995
8	"Chill Factor"	March 30, 1995
9	"Deadline"	April 6, 1995
10	"Carlotta's Room"	April 13, 1995
11	"Deep Cover"	June 10, 1995
12	"Cyberhunt"	June 17, 1995
13	"Zero Tolerance"	June 24, 1995
14	"Forget Me Not"	July 1, 1995
15	"The Gate"	January 20, 1996
16	"Skin Deep"	January 27, 1996
17	"Redemption"	February 2, 1996
18	"Betrayal"	February 19, 1996

=== Adult animated adaptation ===
An adult animated adaptation/reboot of TekWar was announced in September 2021. The project will be developed and written by Matt Michnovetz and produced by Pure Imagination Studios with Shatner's Shatner Universe.

== Video game ==
TekWar was also made into a 1995 computer game by Capstone Software using the Build engine.
