= List of disaster films =

This list of disaster films represents over half a century of films within the genre. Disaster films are motion pictures which depict an impending or ongoing disaster as a central plot feature. The films typically feature large casts and multiple storylines and focus on the protagonists attempts to avert, escape, or cope with the disaster presented.

== Man-made disasters ==
- Ablaze (2001)
- Backdraft (1991)
- The Burning Sea (2021)
- City on Fire (1979)
- The Core (2003)
- Crack in the World (1965)
- Dante's Inferno (1935)
- Daylight (1996)
- Deepwater Horizon (2016)
- Fire! (1977)
- Firestorm (1998)
- In Old Chicago (1937)
- Ladder 49 (2004)
- Pandora (2016)
- Red Skies of Montana (1952)
- The Tower (2012)
- The Towering Inferno (1974)
- Trapped (2001)

== Natural disasters ==
- 10.0 Earthquake (2014)
- 10.5 (2004)
- 13 Minutes (2021)
- 2012 (2009)
- 2012: Doomsday (2008)
- After the Shock (1990)
- Aftershock: Earthquake in New York (1999)
- Armageddon (1998)
- Asteroid (1997)
- Avalanche (1978)
- Beyond the Poseidon Adventure (1979)
- California Firestorm (2002)
- Christmas Icetastrophe (2014)
- Christmas Twister (2012)
- Cyclone (1978)
- Dante's Peak (1997)
- The Day After Tomorrow (2004)
- Deep Impact (1998)
- Deluge (1933) "the first studio produced narrative disaster picture."
- Devil Winds (2003)
- Disaster Zone: Volcano in New York (2006)
- Earthquake (1974)
- Earthquake in New York (1998)
- Fire Twister (2015)
- Flood (2007)
- Flood! (1976)
- Flood: A River's Rampage (1997)
- Geostorm (2017)
- The Great Los Angeles Earthquake (1990)
- Greenland (2020)
- Hard Rain (1998)
- Heatwave! (1974)
- The Hurricane (1937)
- Hurricane (1979)
- Ice (1998)
- The Impossible (2012)
- Into the Storm (2014)
- Killer Flood: The Day the Dam Broke (2003)
- Krakatoa, East of Java (1969)
- Magma: Volcanic Disaster (2006)
- Meteor (1979)
- Nature Unleashed: Avalanche (2004)
- Nature Unleashed: Earthquake (2005)
- Nature Unleashed: Fire (2004)
- Nature Unleashed: Tornado (2005)
- Night of the Twisters (1996)
- The Night the World Exploded (1957)
- NYC: Tornado Terror (2008)
- On Hostile Ground (2000)
- The Perfect Storm (2000)
- Pompeii (2014)
- Poseidon (2006)
- The Poseidon Adventure (1972)
- The Quake (2018)
- The Rains Came (1939)
- Raise the Titanic (1980)
- S.O.S. Titanic (1979)
- San Andreas (2015)
- San Francisco (1936)
- Seattle Superstorm (2012)
- St. Helens (1981)
- Storm (1999)
- Super Cyclone (2012)
- The Happening (2008)
- Tidal Wave (1973)
- Tidal Wave (2009)
- Tidal Wave: No Escape (1997)
- Titanic (1953)
- Titanic (1996)
- Titanic (1997)
- Titanic: The Legend Goes On (2000)
- Tornado! (1996)
- Tornado Warning (2002)
- Twister (1996)
- Twisters (2024)
- Tycus (1998)
- Volcano (1997)
- The Volcano Disaster (also known as Nature Unleashed: Volcano, 2005)
- Volcano: Fire on the Mountain (1997)
- The Wave (2015)
- When Time Ran Out (1980)

== End of days ==
- The Day After (1983)
- Voyage to the Bottom of the Sea (1961)
- When Worlds Collide (1951)
- Knowing (2009)

== Aircraft ==
- Airport (film series), 1970s series of four airplane-themed disaster films
  - Airport (1970 film), a film based on Arthur Hailey's book
  - Airport 1975, sequel to the 1970 film
  - Airport '77, sequel to Airport 1975
  - The Concorde ... Airport '79, 1979 sequel to Airport '77
- Airspeed (1998)
- Alive (1993)
- The Doomsday Flight (1966)
- Fire and Rain (1989)
- The Flight of the Phoenix (1965)
- Flight of the Phoenix (2004)
- The High and the Mighty (1954)
- The Hindenburg (1975)
- Sully (2016)
- Survive! (1976)
- Turbulence (1997)
- United 93 (2006)
- Zero Hour! (1957)

== The atomic age ==
- Atomic Train (1999)
- Atomic Twister (2002)
- Control (1987)
- Friend of the World (2020)
- The Lost Missile (1958)
- Miracle Mile (1988)
- On the Beach (1959)
- Panic in Year Zero! (1962)

== Epidemics and pandemics ==
- The Andromeda Strain (1971)
- The Cassandra Crossing (1976)
- Contagion (2011)
- Outbreak (1995)
- Perfect Sense (2011)
- Plague (1979)
- The Stand (1994)
- Virus (1980)
- Virus (1995)
- Warning Sign (1985)

== Shipwrecks ==
- Beyond the Poseidon Adventure (1979)
- Britannic (2000)
- The Finest Hours (2016)
- Gray Lady Down (1978)
- K-19: The Widowmaker (2002)
- The Last Voyage (1960)
- The Legend of the Titanic (1999)
- A Night to Remember (1958)
- Poseidon (2006)
- The Poseidon Adventure (1972)
- The Poseidon Adventure (2005)
- Raise the Titanic (1980)
- S.O.S. Titanic (1979)
- Titanic (1953)
- Titanic (1996)
- Titanic (1997)
- Titanic: The Legend Goes On (2000)

== See also ==
- Apocalyptic and post-apocalyptic fiction
- Cultural significance of tornadoes § Motion pictures with a tornado theme
- List of apocalyptic films
- List of firefighting films
- List of monster movies
- List of natural horror films
- List of zombie films
- Survival film

== Bibliography ==
- Halliwell, Leslie (1979). Halliwell's Film Guide. New York: Granada Publishing.
- Kay, Glenn; Rose, Michael (2006). Disaster Movies. Chicago: A Capella/Chicago Review Press. ISBN 9781556526121 – via Internet Archive.
