= Night of the Twisters =

1984 book by Ivy Ruckman

- Author: Ivy Ruckman
- Cover artist: Joyce Hopkins
- Language: English
- Genre: Young adult drama
- Set in: Grand Island, Nebraska
- Publisher: Harper & Row
- Publication date: 1984
- Publication place: United States
- Media type: Print (paperback, hardcover)
- Pages: 153
- ISBN: 0-690-04408-9

Night of the Twisters is a young adult realistic fiction novel by Ivy Ruckman that was released in 1984 by publisher Harper & Row (now HarperCollins). The book is a semi-fictionalized account of the 1980 Grand Island tornado outbreak, which produced seven tornadoes (including three that rotated anti-cyclonically) in and around Grand Island, Nebraska, on the evening of June 3, 1980, killing five people and injuring 134. It is told from the point of view of its 12-year-old protagonist Danny Hatch, who – after his home and neighborhood are destroyed by one of the tornadoes – begins a search for his parents as the event takes place.

The book won six literary awards including the Golden Sower Award, the Iowa Children's Choice Award and the Sequoyah Children's Book Award and as well as an Outstanding Science Trade Books for Children recommendation by the National Science Teachers Association and Children's Book Council. A loosely adapted made-for-cable television film of the same name was released on February 14, 1996, airing on The Family Channel (now Freeform).

== Plot ==
At 5:00 p.m. on June 3, 1980, Danny and his best friend Arthur Darlington – a California native with six sisters – take a bike trip to the Mormon Island State Recreation Area to go on their first swim of the summer. There, they discuss the art class taught by Danny's aunt, Goldie, where Arthur created a bull roarer as part of a Native American crafts project; while at Mormon Island, they run into Arthur's 14-year-old older sister Stacey – whom Danny is infatuated with – and 10-year-old younger sister Ronnie Vae, whom Arthur declines to give a ride home before the storm hits. On their way home, Danny and Arthur endure strong winds while cutting through the Fonner Park parking lot and Sand Crane Drive.

An hour later, Danny asks his mother Linda – who quit her job as a hairdresser to take care of her infant son Ryan – to see if Arthur can stay for dinner, while his father John plans to head out to his parents' farm in Phillips after dinner to fix a tractor. After dinner, Goldie arrives to borrow a ball to attend a bowling league night at Meves Bowl. The boys take a bike ride through their neighborhood, run into their elderly neighbor, Belle Smiley, whose hair Linda is supposed to style before a church bazaar that Friday – and visit the Darlington's house. When they return to the Hatch house, as Linda sews a birthday dress for Grandma Hatch, Arthur sits down to watch television, but the show they turn to on KGIN (Note: The book identifies KGIN by its real-life brand name, "10/11," in respective reference to Lincoln parent station KOLN and its Grand Island-based satellite.) is interrupted by a weather bulletin about a tornado and funnel cloud sightings north of Grand Island, in St. Paul and Dannebrog. Linda leaves to check on Mrs. Smiley after being unable to contact her by phone, placing Danny and Arthur in charge of looking after Ryan. Tornado sirens then blare. Danny tries to use the phone to warn his grandparents and John of the oncoming tornado, only for the siren to cut off after Danny hangs up when the phone line cuts out.

Seconds later, the sirens sound again, and Arthur rushes to tell Danny of a tornado alert that was broadcast over the radio. Right then, a tornado hits their neighborhood, sending Danny and Arthur scrambling to get Ryan and take cover in the basement. As the twister starts to obliterate the Hatches' home, they ride out the storm in the shower of the basement's bathroom; they remain there after the tornado passes, as rain and hail hit them from above the hole where the house's first floor once stood, and as water from one of the severed underground pipes seeps in underneath them. Danny and Arthur escape from the basement (with Ryan in tow) through the collapsing floor beams with the help of Stacey (who arrived after the storm passed, searching for Arthur). She informs Arthur that the rest of their family is alive, although Ronnie Vae was sucked out of the Darlingtons' now-demolished home (as she, Stacey and Mrs. Darlington could not fit under the master bed with the other four Darlington children, leaving the three having to resort to lying flat on the floor) and knocked unconscious after landing into the bushes of their neighbors, the Winegars. Stacey and Arthur spot Linda running toward them, later recalling how she and Mrs. Smiley took shelter.

As rescuers search for residents unaccounted for, Danny, Arthur and Stacey volunteer to search for Mrs. Smiley, who is trapped in her roofless house, to the reluctant allowance of Linda, who takes Ryan and boards a bus to a shelter. The three go to rescue Belle from the basement, using her kitchen table to navigate to her amid the partially collapsed back stairs, after Dan and Arthur find her asleep on a sofa, which they use as a makeshift ladder to get her and themselves out the window with Stacey helping from outside. While seeking information about his dad, Danny learns that tornadoes were reported near Phillips, where John and Danny's grandparents are. As Dan, Stacey and Arthur are transported by the police with other evacuees to the Kmart on South Locust Street (one of the few buildings that escaped damage from another tornado that hit the business district minutes after the one that destroyed the Hatches' and Darlingtons' neighborhood struck), Danny struggles to find out what happened to the Hatch farm, when he hears a message on the two-way radio that Meves Bowl was struck. The police car experiences a close call, when another tornado touches down nearby and cuts through their path; Officer Kelly – who begins to lose his vision after the car's windows shatter from the twister's outer winds, spraying his eyes with flying glass – then asks Dan to help steer the car to the Grand Island Police Department headquarters, eventually letting Danny take over driving.

At the police station, Dan, Arthur and Stacey are moved to the women's room of the jail that is serving as an emergency shelter for some tornado victims, where at one point, they listen to stories from other families who lost their homes in the first tornado; Arthur wonders if playing with the bull roarer caused the tornadoes due to a Hopi legend that its roar brings about whirlwinds, leading Dan to wonder himself if the tornado was his punishment for his jealousy and resentment of Ryan. Struggling to sleep, Stacey helps calm Danny down by quoting scripture, when the generator at the station goes out partway through the verse, knocking out power to the building. The next morning, Danny, Arthur and Stacey discuss walking to the Kmart and an armory, when the jail matron, Mrs. Minetti, asks the policewoman on duty to take the kids there on her way to her house in Doniphan.

At the armory, Stacey and Arthur reunite with their father, working in his office, who was out searching for his two oldest children the previous night. Before Minetti escorts Danny to the Kmart where Linda and Ryan are, Mr. Darlington reveals that he does not know the whereabouts of John or Goldie. With all streets barricaded either by bulldozers and emergency vehicles or downed lines and water on the roadway, Danny walks to the Kmart on his own. There, he finds out the store's parking lot was turned into an emergency command post and all civilians taken to the store were evacuated during the night due to high water, being transported to other shelters.

As Dan runs to his destroyed house to see if either of his parents went there, John – with Linda and Ryan in the passenger's seat – drives up behind in his pickup truck as Danny crosses Fonner Park, where the family is reunited. The tornado that hit Phillips had missed the farm (although the crops in the farmland were flooded by the rain accompanying the storm), and John spent much of the overnight searching around Grand Island for the rest of the family after returning to town and the remnants of their home on Sand Crane Drive around 1:15 a.m., eventually finding Linda and Ryan at a Presbyterian church – where they and Mrs. Smiley were sleeping on a rug in the minister's study – three hours and 15 minutes later but unable to find Danny when at the police station.

The family temporarily stays on the Hatch farm, along with Arthur, whose family members stay elsewhere, with Stacey living with her friend Evelyn, while Ronnie Vae (who went mute for three days after the tornado) stays with cousins in California, before the Hatches and Darlingtons move into government-provided trailers in August. Goldie – who, after being rescued from the destroyed Meves Bowl, was taken to Omaha by a truck driver, where she stays in a hotel, before reuniting with the Hatches on the farm the following Friday by transport from a Red Cross volunteer – opts to move into an apartment closer to the center of Grand Island. People in and outside of town help bring food and supplies to Grand Island, including Mrs. Smiley, who – aided by Mennonites – serves canned food to people there.

On June 3, 1981, the Hatches throw a party commemorating the first anniversary of the tornado in their newly rebuilt home. They have adopted a new cat, Minerva II, to replace the one who disappeared during the tornado and Arthur's mother has given birth to a seventh child, Tempest June. Mrs. Smiley died three months before, while waiting for a doctor's appointment.

== Background ==
Ivy Ruckman – a native of Hastings, Nebraska (26 miles [42 km] south of Grand Island) – based the book on the experiences of her first cousin, Florence Rozendal, following the Grand Island tornado outbreak, the common nickname of which the book's title is derived. The home on Bismark Road in Grand Island that was inhabited by Rozendal, her husband, Harley, and their three children – sons Mark and Ryan, and daughter Cindy – was destroyed by an F4 tornado that caused severe damage throughout the southern portion of the city during the early evening of June 3. (The Rozendahls later rebuilt a new home in the same location where the original once stood.) Ruckman learned of the tornado's impact on Grand Island during a radio news report that ran hours after the storm, and subsequently made multiple failed attempts to contact her cousin by phone, eventually discovering that Florence and her family had survived several days later, when – while visiting her cousin's mother in Hastings – a police officer notified them that she had made it through the storm; Ruckman talked to Rozendahl ten days after the tornado struck. In October 1981, Ruckman attempted to get Rozendahl to write an account of her experiences during the tornado for a piece in Reader's Digest, which paid $1,000 for first-person reports of major events.

After Rozendahl's account was rejected by the magazine, Ruckman chose to adapt the story into a book, noting that no children's books about tornadoes had existed at the time. When Ruckman began to research the events of the outbreak in May 1982, when preparing to write the book (at which time, most areas of the city that were destroyed by the tornadoes were already rebuilt), the Rozendal family recalled to her stories of how they survived the tornado and other personal accounts in its aftermath. The book incorporates events occurring to the Rozendahls in the book; among them, Florence – like Linda Hatch – had been sewing a dress at her kitchen table, as her children repeatedly asked if they were going to shelter in the basement as the weather worsened; as experienced by Danny and Arthur before the tornado hit the Hatch home, the Rozendahls heard sucking noises emanating from their sink and pipe drains, and sought cover from the tornado in their basement shower (where Danny, Arthur and Ryan sheltered within the Hatch family's home in the book). Florence's son Ryan, an infant at the time of the storm, also served as the namesake for the infant son of John and Linda in the book, while Kelly Buck, a deputy with the Hall County Sheriff's Department who had spotted the first of the seven tornadoes in northwest Grand Island and who died from an inoperable brain tumor two months before Ruckman sought to interview him, inspired the character of Officer Kelly.

As the book was based on the real-life events of the storm, Ruckman also incorporated references to cities and landmarks within Hall County and central Nebraska into the book (including points of interest within Grand Island such as Dodge Elementary School, Mormon Island State Park and the Fonner Park horse racetrack, as well as the nearby towns of Dannebrog, Phillips and St. Paul) as well as an Associated Press report on the storm that is included as the book's foreword; however, the neighborhood depicted as the one where Danny lived was partially fictionalized, although incorporating two real-life streets in the city, Sand Crane Drive and Fonda Way. Ruckman stated in a 1990 interview with the Grand Island Independent that writing Night of the Twisters gave her more of a respect at the power of severe weather, acknowledging, "I'm a lot more afraid of tornadoes than I used to be."

== Film adaptation ==
Night of the Twisters is a 1996 American disaster film that was based on the book and directed by Timothy Bond. The film premiered on February 14, 1996 on The Family Channel (now Freeform). The movie version is a loose adaptation of Ruckman's novel, set in the fictional Nebraska town of Blainsworth, in which a teenaged aspiring artist Danny (Devon Sawa) deals with his father (John Schneider) – who is renamed Jack and established as his stepfather, whereas Danny's biological father died in a plane crash years prior – constantly pushing him into being an athlete.

As the film is structured as a coming-of-age story, most of the adaptation both follows portions of as well as differs from the book (among the differences, Danny's mother – who is renamed Laura (Lori Hallier) – works as a diner waitress, instead of as a hair dresser-turned-homemaker; the inclusion of characters such as storm chaser Bob Iverson (David Ferry) and a more prominent role of Danny's grandmother; as well as the absence of four of Arthur's younger siblings and the Hatch family cat, Minerva), with more of a focus on Danny's heroic efforts to try and reunite with his family. The movie also stars Amos Crawley as Arthur Darlington, Laura Bertram as Stacey Darlington and Alex and Thomas Lastewka as Ryan Hatch.
