= 1980 Grand Island tornado outbreak =

1980 windstorm in Grand Island, Nebraska, USA

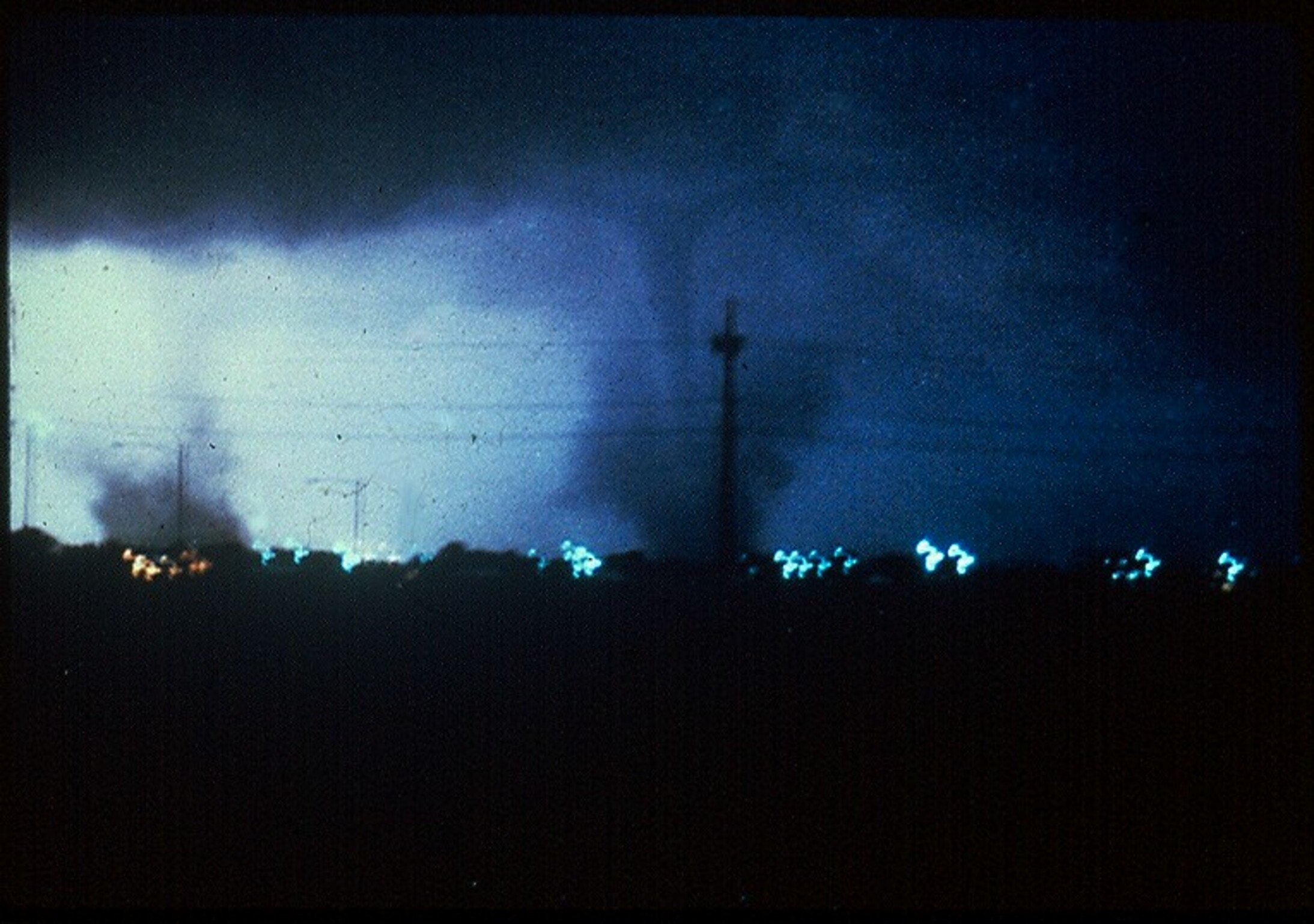
- One of two known photographs of the Grand Island tornadoes.

Meteorological history
- Duration: June 3, 1980

Tornado outbreak
- Tornadoes: 29
- Max. rating: F4 tornado
- Duration: 2 days

Overall effects
- Fatalities: 6
- Injuries: 413
- Damage: $300 million (1980 USD) $1.122 billion (2024 USD)
- Areas affected: Midwestern and Northeastern United States
- Part of the tornado outbreaks of 1980

The 1980 Grand Island tornado outbreak, also known as The Night of the Twisters, was a tornado outbreak that produced a series of destructive and exceptionally erratic tornadoes that affected the city of Grand Island, Nebraska, on June 3, 1980. Seven tornadoes occurred in or near the city that night, killing five people and injuring 200.

The name generally used by Grand Island area residents for the event, "The Night of the Twisters", comes from the semi-fictionalized book of the same name, loosely based on the June 3, 1980 tornadoes, by author Ivy Ruckman, which in turn inspired a made-for-TV movie of the same name that premiered on The Family Channel (now Freeform) in February 1996. While the outbreak is best known for the Grand Island tornado family on June 3, the event as a whole produced 29 tornadoes across two days, causing severe damage as far east as Pennsylvania. In addition to the five deaths that occurred in the Grand Island area, the outbreak injured a total of 413 across seven states.

== Outbreak description ==
The outbreak began on June 2, producing strong tornadoes in Iowa, Indiana, and Ohio, including one that struck the east side of Indianapolis. One fatality occurred near Crawfordsville, Indiana. Tornado activity continued on June 3, with additional strong tornadoes touching down in Pennsylvania, Maryland, West Virginia, and Nebraska. Over a span of three hours on the evening of June 3, 1980, a slow-moving supercell complex moving across Grand Island, Nebraska, spawned several tornadoes. The resulting outbreak was one of the most unusual in United States history: The supercells moved over the city at only 8 mph (13 km/h); of the seven tornadoes, three of them were anticyclonic; and the tornadoes did not move in a straight line, with most looping back over their own path at least once.

== Confirmed tornadoes ==
Confirmed tornadoes by Fujita rating
FU	F0	F1	F2	F3	F4	F5	Total
0	2	11	9	4	3	0	29

=== June 2 event ===
List of confirmed tornadoes – Monday, June 2, 1980 (Note: All dates are based on the local time zone where the tornado touched down; however, all times are in Coordinated Universal Time for consistency.)
F#	Location	County / Parish	State	Start Coord.	Time (UTC)	Path length	Max width	Summary
F2	SW of Belvidere	Thayer	NE	40.23°N 97.6°W	0930	2 mi (3.2 km)	300 yd (270 m)	
F2	S of Allerton	Wayne	IA	40.65°N 93.42°W	1230	4.7 mi (7.6 km)	80 yd (73 m)	Tornado struck a farm, twisting the house off its foundation and destroying several outbuildings. Six train cars were derailed and another home lost its roof.
F1	SW of Numa	Appanoose	IA	40.67°N 93.02°W	1300	2 mi (3.2 km)	30 yd (27 m)	Three people were injured.
F2	Cincinnati to SE of West Grove	Appanoose, Davis	IA	40.63°N 92.92°W	1305	19.8 mi (31.9 km)	80 yd (73 m)	Trees were damaged and three homes were partially unroofed. Three trailer homes were destroyed, and other homes and trailers were damaged. A Masonic Lodge was damaged as well. There were five injuries, all of which occurred in trailer homes.
F2	SSW of Covington	Fountain	IN	40.13°N 87.4°W	1800	0.1 mi (0.16 km)	10 yd (9.1 m)	A hardware store and four homes were destroyed in Covington.
F3	SW of Waynetown to Ladoga	Montgomery	IN	40.08°N 87.07°W	1800	18.1 mi (29.1 km)	10 yd (9.1 m)	1 death – High-end F3 damage and serious injuries occurred southwest of Crawfordsville. One woman was killed when her trailer was obliterated and scattered over 30 acres. Caused $2,000,000 in damage and injured 16 people.
F2	Northern Indianapolis	Marion	IN	39.78°N 86.15°W	1900	0.1 mi (0.16 km)	10 yd (9.1 m)	A high-end F2 tornado struck the east side of Indianapolis, destroying four homes and damaging a dozen others. Flying debris caused a traffic accident on I-465. Six people were injured.
F2	New Palestine	Hancock	IN	39.72°N 85.88°W	1930	0.1 mi (0.16 km)	10 yd (9.1 m)	A high-end F2 tornado tore apart many homes in town and ripped the roof off of a grocery store. A high school and an elementary school were heavily damaged. Four people were injured, including a woman who was trapped in the debris of her trailer home.
F0	SW of Rushville	Rush	IN	39.72°N 85.88°W	2000	0.1 mi (0.16 km)	10 yd (9.1 m)	One person was injured.
F1	Wyoming to S of Madeira	Hamilton	OH	39.23°N 84.47°W	2105	6.2 mi (10.0 km)	70 yd (64 m)	There were 15 injuries.
F4	Lamoni to NW of Powersville, MO	Decatur, Wayne	IA	40.62°N 93.92°W	2125	31.2 mi (50.2 km)	140 yd (130 m)	A long-track, violent tornado completely destroyed a farmhouse near Davis City, and unroofed a fertilizer plant.
F1	S of Epworth to S of Peosta	Dubuque	IA	42.43°N 90.93°W	2320	3.6 mi (5.8 km)	50 yd (46 m)	
F1	Tippecanoe Lake	Kosciusko	IN	41.32°N 85.75°W	2330	0.1 mi (0.16 km)	10 yd (9.1 m)	One person was injured.
F1	SW of Oak Hill to W of Patriot	Jackson, Lawrence, Gallia	OH	39.23°N 84.47°W	2330	11.5 mi (18.5 km)	150 yd (140 m)	Two homes were unroofed and seven farm buildings were destroyed near the rural community of Blackford. Grazulis lists this tornado as an F2.
F1	SW of Dixon, IN and OH	Adams	IN	40.92°N 84.83°W	0000	0.1 mi (0.16 km)	10 yd (9.1 m)	Three people were injured.
F1	E of Manchester	Washtenaw	MI	42.15°N 84°W	0535	0.1 mi (0.16 km)	10 yd (9.1 m)	

=== June 3 event ===
List of confirmed tornadoes – Tuesday, June 3, 1980
F#	Location	County / Parish	State	Start Coord.	Time (UTC)	Path length	Max width	Summary
F4	NW of Harrison Township to Vandergrift to SE of Orchard Hills	Allegheny, Westmoreland, Armstrong	PA	40.65°N 79.73°W	1630	11.8 mi (19.0 km)	10 yd (9.1 m)	A restaurant and two stores were severely damaged in Natrona Heights, with 12 injuries at that location. Seven homes were damaged in Vandergrift, and a trailer park in Apollo was devastated. One home was nearly leveled by this tornado. Caused $6,000,000 in damage and injured 140 people. Rated F3 by Grazulis.
F2	Avonmore to Clarksburg	Indiana	PA	40.53°N 79.47°W	1705	4.9 mi (7.9 km)	10 yd (9.1 m)	A half dozen homes, a helicopter, and three trailers were torn apart. Six people were injured.
F3	SE of Ridgedale, West Virginia to Oakland, Maryland	Monongalia (WV), Preston (WV), Garrett (MD)	WV, MD	39.53°N 79.9°W	1705	29.8 mi (48.0 km)	150 yd (140 m)	In West Virginia, 28 homes were destroyed and 102 others were damaged. Thirteen businesses and nine public buildings were damaged as well. Reedsville was hard hit. A mobile home park there was destroyed, and a two-year-old child was thrown nearly a mile into a field, but survived. The tornado continued into Maryland where two trailer homes were destroyed, 15 permanent homes were damaged, and 12 farms were damaged. Caused $7,000,000 in damage and 19 injuries. Most destructive West Virginia tornado since 1944.
F1	Vincentown	Burlington	NJ	39.93°N 74.75°W	2000	0.5 mi (0.80 km)	30 yd (27 m)	
F2	N of Dover to N of Gilberts Corner	Loudoun	VA	39°N 77.67°W	2000	2.7 mi (4.3 km)	100 yd (91 m)	
F0	N of Watford City	McKenzie	ND	47.88°N 103.38°W	2130	0.1 mi (0.16 km)	10 yd (9.1 m)	
F3	SW of St. Libory to Western Grand Island	Hall	NE	41.02°N 98.4°W	0145–0234	6.4 mi (10.3 km)	700 yd (640 m)	1 death – Tornado touched down 11 miles northwest of Grand Island. First of seven tornadoes to hit the city in just over two hours. Farm homes outside of town were torn apart, and a woman was killed while trying to drive to a relative's house. 25 others were injured and caused an estimated $2.5 million in damages. Although the straight line (and official) path length of the tornado was only about 7.0 miles (11.3 km), the actual length was over double that at 14.5 miles (23.3 km) because the track was highly unusual in that it looped and crossed itself numerous times, while spending 49 minutes on the ground.
F1	Northwestern Grand Island	Hall	NE	40.95°N 98.37°W	0200–0212	0.8 mi (1.3 km)	150 yd (140 m)	Small anticyclonic tornado briefly touched down in the northern edges of Grand Island, just east of the first tornado. Second of seven tornadoes to hit the city in just over two hours. The tornado caused an estimated $25,000 in damages and five injuries. First of three anticyclonic tornadoes.
F3	Grand Island	Hall	NE	40.97°N 98.35°W	0205–0230	2.3 mi (3.7 km)	500 yd (460 m)	1 death – Tornado touched down north of Grand Island and moved into the city near Airport Road, between US 281 and Webb Road. Third of seven tornadoes to hit the city in just over two hours. The tornado injured 40, killed one, and caused an estimated $2.5 million in damages. Although most damage was rated F0, several homes were heavily damaged and some F3 damage was noted near the veteran's home, which had windows blown out. Second of three anticyclonic tornadoes. While the path is officially listed as 2.3 miles (3.7 km), the distance covered by the tornado was 3.5 miles (5.6 km) due to its curving nature.
F1	Southeastern Grand Island	Hall	NE	40.88°N 98.3°W	0246–0250	2.3 mi (3.7 km)	100 yd (91 m)	Fourth of seven tornadoes to hit the city in just over two hours. Tornado touched down southeast of Grand Island and moved toward the southwest, west, and north. This was the last of three anticyclonic tornadoes.
F4	Grand Island	Hall	NE	40.92°N 98.3°W	0316–0328	1.1 mi (1.8 km)	1,700 yd (1,600 m)	3 deaths – Fifth of seven tornadoes to hit the city in just over two hours. Tornado touched down just east of Grand Island, then moved west into the city. Once within the city, the tornado turned south and followed Locust Street, causing some of the most intense damage of the outbreak to businesses and neighboring residences, some of which were "obliterated". Numerous homes, vehicles, businesses, trees, and power lines were destroyed. Damages exceeded $200 million, and 110 people were injured. While the path length is listed as 1.1 miles (1.8 km), the curving path of the tornado covered a distance of 6 miles (9.7 km). Peak winds in the most intense damage areas were estimated to be at 250 miles per hour (400 km/h).
F2	SE of Grand Island	Hall	NE	40.9°N 98.28°W	0325–0335	3.4 mi (5.5 km)	1,700 yd (1,600 m)	A large tornado touched down southeast of Grand Island, causing significant damage in rural areas. Sixth of the seven tornadoes that hit Grand Island. The tornado caused an estimated $2.5 million in damages and 18 injuries. While the official track is listed at 3.4 miles (5.5 km), the curving path of the tornado caused it to travel a total distance of 6 miles (9.7 km).
F1	SE of Grand Island to N of Giltner	Hall, Hamilton	NE	40.83°N 98.28°W	0400–0430	4.1 mi (6.6 km)	2,000 yd (1,800 m)	A large tornado touched down southeast of Grand Island. Last of the seven tornadoes in the area. The tornado caused an estimated $2.5 million in damages and two injuries. The tornado tracked across mostly rural areas and avoided many homes. While the official track is listed at 4.1 miles (6.6 km), the tornado looped numerous times, traveling a total distance of 13.4 miles (21.6 km).

== Notable tornadoes ==
Central Indiana
- Top: A map of where tornadoes and other severe storms in West-Central Indiana struck. Bottom: Damage to a home in the Moore Heights subdivision south of Crawfordsville.

Meteorological history
- Formed: June 2, 1980; 1:00 p.m. EDT (UTC−04:00)
- Dissipated: June 2, 1980; 3:00 p.m. EDT (UTC−04:00)
- Duration: 2 hours

Tornadoes
- Tornadoes: 5 confirmed
- Max. rating: F3 tornado
- Duration: ~2 hours
- Highest winds: 158–206 mph (254–332 km/h)

Overall effects
- Fatalities: 1
- Injuries: 27
- Damage: >$18 million (1980 USD) $73.18 million (2026 USD)
- Areas affected: Fountain, Montgomery, Marion, Hancock, and Rush counties in Indiana

During the early afternoon hours of June 2, several powerful thunderstorms formed in eastern Illinois, and tracked southeastward into Indiana. These storms produced a total of five tornadoes across its track through Indiana, starting from 1:00 pm EDT, to around 3:00 pm EDT. Funnel clouds were first reported in Benton County near I-65 at 11:12 am EDT, and near Mellott in Montgomery County at 11:25 am EDT.

The first tornado touched down at around 1:00 pm EDT near the town of Covington in Fountain County. The tornado tracked into Covington at 1:05 pm EDT, and immediately demolished the top story of a hardware store. The tornado also damaged or destroyed 7 homes in town before leaving to the southeast. The tornado was last seen south of Veedersburg, paralleled to I-75. The tornado caused $5 million USD (1980) to the town of Covington, and an additional $9 million USD (1980) in rural areas. Two people were injured, with only one injury noted to be serious. The tornado was rated as F2.

Damage to a home along Richardt Avenue in Indianapolis.

The second tornado was spotted near Waynetown in the northwest parts of Montgomery County at around 1:15 pm EDT. The tornado was described as dipping up and down as it tracked southeastward at a rapid speed. The tornado did little damage until south of Crawfordsville, where the tornado rapidly intensified as it approached the Moore Heights subdivision. Several homes in the subdivision were heavily damaged, with nine being completely destroyed at near-F4 intensity. Then the tornado struck the Rock River Feed and Fur Company, completely destroying the structure. The tornado continued south towards the town of Ladoga, where the tornado struck several mobile homes, killing a mother and injuring her son in one trailer that was scattered over 30 acres. The tornado lifted north of Ladoga at 2:00 pm EDT after tracking for 18.1 miles (29.13 km). The tornado caused an estimated $2 million USD (1980), claimed the life of one, and injured 16 others. The tornado was rated as F3.

At 2:20 pm EDT, the third tornado touched down in the city of Indianapolis. The short lived but powerful tornado touched down along East Pleasant Run Parkway South Drive, instantly destroying a camper in the driveway of a home, and a six foot diameter oak tree was split in half in the backyard. A stop sign on the corner of Marianne Avenue and Arlene Drive was bent to the ground. The tornado then destroyed the garage of a home on Marianne Avenue before rapidly intensifying and destroyed four to six homes on the corner of Marianne and Richardt Avenue at near-F3 intensity, with a dozen other homes receiving lesser damage. The tornado threw debris from the homes onto I-465, causing a car accident. The tornado then lifted after crossing the embankment of I-70 and I-465. The tornado was rated as F2.

The remnants of a grain silo that was thrown a quarter mile by a tornado east of New Palestine.

At 2:30 pm EDT, the fourth tornado touched down near the town of New Palestine in Hancock County. The tornado first struck both the elementary and high schools in the southern part of town. The tornado removed huge sections off while breaking several windows from both schools. The tornado also ripped a gaping hole in the high schools agricultural building while throwing bleachers across the football field. Cars in the barking lot were moved, with one having its roof removed. The tornado then struck the J. B. Clayborn Shoe Store on Bitter Road, completely leveling the structure. Then the tornado struck structures on Main Street, with every business having its front windows blown out and multiple having chunks torn out of the structures, with one grocery store being un-roofed. Then the tornado struck two trailer homes, flipping both. The tornado then tore apart multiple homes at near-F3 intensity. Then the tornado uprooted several trees along Sugar Creek before leaving town to the southeast. The tornado continued to track along U.S. 52 before striking the Carleton Apartments, tossing a boat into one of the 16 units. Every window of the apartments were blow out before the tornado then turned due north, where it struck a farm, shredding the barn and grain silo. Parts of the silo were thrown up to a quarter-mile away. The tornado lifted shortly after, tracking for four miles. The tornado injured four people and caused $2 million USD (1980) in damages. The tornado was rated as F2.

The last tornado touched down in rural Rush County southwest of Rushville at around 3:00 pm EDT. The brief tornado uprooted several trees, with one falling onto a vehicle, injuring one person before lifting. The tornado was rated as F0. The tornadoes in total caused more than $18 million USD (1980) in damages, claiming the life of one, and injuring a further 27 over the estimated 2 hour duration.

Two more tornadoes touched down in the northeast portions of Indiana on June 2, both being rated as F1, and causing a combined four injuries.

=== Natrona Heights–Apollo–Vandergrift, Pennsylvania ===
Natrona Heights–Apollo–Vandergrift, Pennsylvania
- An aerial view of the Edgewood Trailer Court in Apollo after the tornado.

Meteorological history
- Formed: June 3, 1980; 12:30 p.m. EDT (UTC−04:00)
- Dissipated: June 3, 1980; Unknown

F4 tornado
- on the Fujita scale
- Highest winds: 207–260 mph (333–418 km/h)

Overall effects
- Fatalities: 0
- Injuries: 140
- Damage: $6 million (1980 USD) $24.31 million (2026 USD)

Fishers Big Wheel discount department store in Natrona Heights following the tornado.

At 12:30 pm EDT, a tornado touched down in Allegheny County in western Pennsylvania. The tornado tracked east-southeastward where it tracked into Natrona Heights. The Heights Plaza Shopping Center in Natrona Heights, a horse-shoe shaped mall of around 50 stores, was directly struck, resulting in two stores and a restaurant being severely damaged. A quarter of Fishers Big Wheel discount department store was left completely destroyed, with a majority of the structures roof being completely removed.

=== Reedsville–Kingwood, West Virginia/Crellin, Maryland ===
Reedsville–Kingwood, West Virginia/Crellin, Maryland
- A map of the tornadoes track through West Virginia and Maryland.

Meteorological history
- Formed: June 3, 1980; 2:30 p.m. EDT (UTC−04:00)
- Dissipated: June 3, 1980; ~3:35 p.m. EDT (UTC−04:00)
- Duration: 1 hour, 5 minutes

F3 tornado
- on the Fujita scale
- Highest winds: 158–206 mph (254–332 km/h)

Overall effects
- Fatalities: 0
- Injuries: 19
- Damage: $4.34 million (1980 USD) $17.64 million (2026 USD)

At 2:30 pm EDT, a tornado touched down Ridgedale in far eastern Monogalia County in northeast West Virginia. The tornado tracked east-southeastward into Preston County, where it struck Reedsville, a community that had a population of 400 at the time. The Reedsville fire hall had its roof completely torn off by the tornado, and the new fire hall which was under construction at the time, suffered significant damage to one side of the structure. The tornado then continued southeast where it struck the southern sections of Kingwood. The Kingwood Mobile Home Village took a direct hit, where extensive damage occurred. A two year old child in the mobile home park was thrown into a pasture a mile away from her trailer. She suffered a fractured leg and various head injures. The tornado continued to track southeastward where it passed 2.5 miles south of Terra Alta.

The tornado then crossed into Garrett County, Maryland at 2:55 pm EDT. The debris filled tornado demolished two mobile homes near the state line, with a man from one of the trailers being thrown 50 feet while attempting to seek shelter. The tornado then impacted rural farms before striking the community of Crellin. 15 homes in Crellin were damaged by the tornado, with one home being destroyed when a tree fell through the roof of the home. Several trees were uprooted as the tornado destroyed buildings on 12 farms across its track in Maryland. The tornado continued southeastward until it crossed Backbone Mountain when the tornado lifted.

In total, the tornado tracked for 29 miles across three counties in two states, 24 miles of the track was in West Virginia, with the remaining 5 miles in Maryland. Damage in West Virginia was estimated to be $4 million USD (1980). 28 homes in West Virginia being completely destroyed, 42 suffering major damage, and 60 suffering minor damage, alongside 13 businesses and 9 public buildings being heavily damaged by the tornado. Total property damage in Maryland was estimated to be $300,000 USD (1980), with additional crop damage adding an additional $40 thousand USD (1980). 19 people were injured by the tornado, 15 in West Virginia, and four in Maryland.

This tornado was the most destructive and devastating to strike the state of West Virginia since June 23, 1944.

=== Grand Island, Nebraska tornado family ===
Grand Island, Nebraska
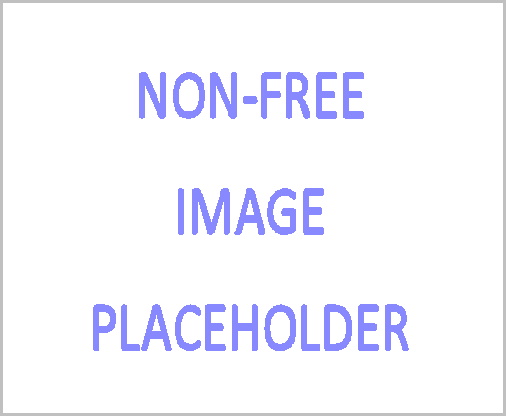
- The Bismark–South Locust tornado in Grand Island on June 3 being illuminated by lightning.

Meteorological history
- Formed: June 3, 1980; 8:45 p.m. CDT (UTC−05:00)
- Dissipated: June 3, 1980; 11:30 p.m. CDT (UTC−05:00)
- Duration: 2 hours, 45 minutes

Tornado family
- Tornadoes: 7
- Max. rating: F4 tornado
- Highest winds: 250 mph (400 km/h) (Bismark–South Locust F4)

Overall effects
- Fatalities: 5
- Injuries: 200–250
- Damage: $305.1 million (1980 USD) $1.24 billion (2026 USD)

A map of the Grand Island tornado tracks made by Ted Fujita and Roger Wakimoto.

An aerial view of the business district on South Locust Street after being struck by the fifth tornado.

During the late evening hours of June 3, a slow-moving but powerful supercell in Nebraska produced seven tornadoes in and around the city of Grand Island, Nebraska over the course of 2 hours and 45 minutes, starting from 8:45 pm CDT, and concluding at 11:30 pm CDT. Three of the seven tornadoes were anti-cyclonic, and every tornado had highly erratic paths due to the slow forward speed of the parent thunderstorm complex.

The first tornado touched down at 8:45 pm CDT around 11 miles northwest of Grand Island, or 3 miles north of Prairie Creek. The tornado impacted several farmsteads northwest of Grand Island before causing significant damage to the Capital Heights subdivision. The tornado remained on the ground for 45 minutes, injuring 25 people, and claiming the life of a woman trying to drive to a relatives farm. Despite having a straight-line path of only 7 miles, the tornadoes highly erratic and twisting path lead to the tornado tracking for 14.5 miles. The tornado was rated as F3.

The second and third tornadoes touched down near Webb and Airport roads at 9:00 pm CDT and 9:05 pm CDT respectively. Both tornadoes were anti-cyclonic and initially tracked north-northeast before shifting due south. At around the same time, local resident Rod Gartner captured a photograph of the second and third tornadoes on the ground. The second tornado lifted at 9:12 pm CDT, as the third tornado tracked into northern Grand Island, causing F3 damage around the VA hospital before lifting at 9:30 pm CDT just north of downtown. The second tornado was rated as F1 and injured 5 people, and the third tornado was rated as F3 and injured 40.

The fourth tornado touched down near Highway 34 and Shady Bend Road and initially tracked southwest before turning north and lifting just south of Highway 34. The tornado was the last anti-cyclonic tornado of the family and was rated as F1.

After a 26 minute period of no tornadoes, the fifth tornado, often nicknamed the "South Locust tornado", touched down in the Eagles Lake and Crystal lake areas of east Grand Island. The tornado tracked due west just north and along Bismark Road, striking Meves Bowling Alley. The bowling alley suffered significant damage as multiple non load-bearing walls collapsed along with significant portions of the metal roofing being stripped off. The tornado then became violent as it turned southwestward, tearing through residential areas along Bismark and Fonner Roads. The tornado then turned due south, striking the business district on South Locust Street where the tornado obliterated homes and businesses at peak intensity. The tornado began turning southeast before crossing Highway 34, weakening in intensity as it tracked another half-mile southeastward before lifting at 10:28 pm CDT. The tornado was the strongest and deadliest of the family, claiming the lives of 4 people and injuring 110. The tornado was rated as F4 with winds of 250 miles per hour.

The sixth tornado touched down at 10:25 pm CDT east of Shady Bend Road, tracking southwest near Stuhr Road before turning southeast and traveling south of Shimmer Road before lifting 1 mile south of the Hall/Hamilton County Bridge. The tornado injured 18 people over its 4 mile long track, and was rated as F2.

The last tornado of the family touched down southeast of the Hall/Hamilton County Bridge. The tornado tracked east-northeast for 13 miles over rural farmland before lifting south of Phillips, Nebraska. The tornado injured 2 people and was rated as F1.

1,038 homes and 35 businesses in Grand Island suffered minor damage, 415 homes and 23 businesses suffered major damage, and 531 homes and 49 businesses were completely destroyed. Outside of Grand Island, 20 farms and 80 farm buildings suffered minor damage, 11 farms suffered major damage, and 35 farms, 48 farm buildings, and 100 grain silos were destroyed, along side 17 square miles of farmland being affected. Resulting damages totaled up to $305.1 million USD in 1980. ($1.24 billion USD in 2026). The tornadoes claimed the lives of 5 people, and reportedly hospitalized 250 others.

== Aftermath ==
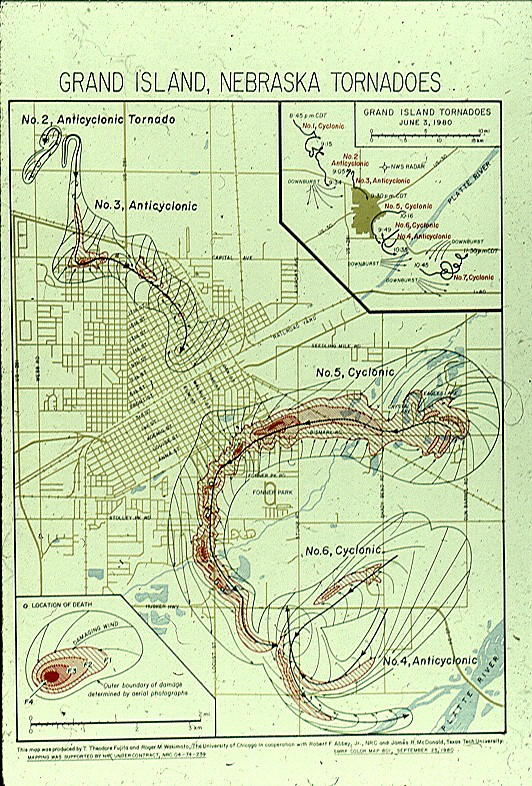
Map of surveyed tornado tracks through the Grand Island area by Ted Fujita.

The tornadoes in Grand Island, Nebraska killed five, injured 200, and caused an estimated more than $285 million (USD) ($1.02 billion 2022 USD) in damage. In Nebraska, tornado warnings allowed people to get to safety in time, which prevented a higher death toll. The South Locust Street area in Grand Island was hardest hit, struck by the fifth tornado of the night (a high-end F4 tornado). Much of the rubble and debris left by the tornadoes was placed in a landfill that now forms Tornado Hill, a popular biking and sledding spot in Grand Island today.

== Fictionalized accounts of the event ==
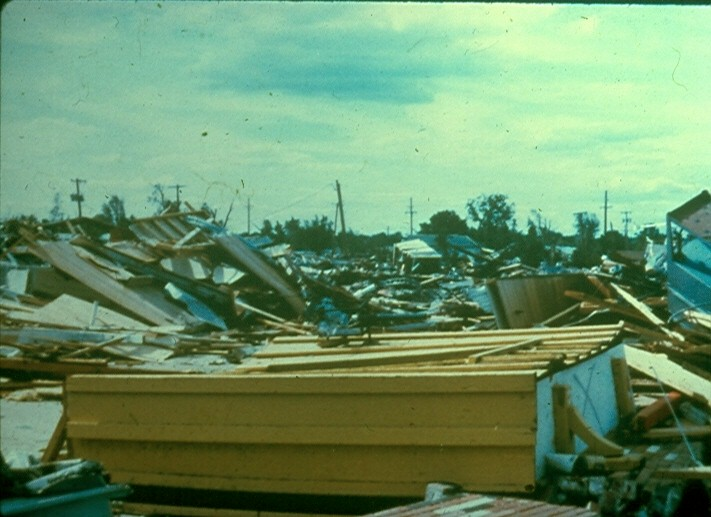
Damage from the Grand Island tornadoes.

=== Book ===
In 1984, a semi-fictionalized book version of this significant tornado outbreak by children's author Ivy Ruckman, a native of Nebraska, was released under the title Night of the Twisters. The book told the story of Danny Hatch, a pre-teen and his family, and what happened to them as the event took place.

=== Television film ===
The book inspired a made-for-cable television original movie of the same name, that premiered on February 14, 1996, on The Family Channel (now Freeform). The movie version still centered on the Hatch Family and most of the characters in the book were adapted to the film. However, there were several discrepancies from the movie and the book version. The most notable being the town in the movie is changed from Grand Island to the fictional town of Blainsworth, which Ivy Ruckman reportedly was disappointed about as it took some of the reality out of the actual event. Danny's father's name is changed to Jack in the film (played by John Schneider) and is mentioned to be his stepfather as Danny's real father is revealed to have died in a plane crash when Danny was six years old. One somewhat prominent character in the movie was Bob Iverson (played by David Ferry), who was not included in the book.

Danny's mother's occupation is also changed to waitress. The last scene in the film in which the Hatch family tries to outrun a tornado in a car lent to them at a shelter was added specifically for the film and was not in the book, either. Danny and his friend Arthur's (played by Devon Sawa and Amos Crawley) ages are also changed to their mid-teens (though their ages are never mentioned in the film).

== See also ==
- List of North American tornadoes and tornado outbreaks
