= Cultural significance of tornadoes =

"A single experience of this awful convulsion of the elements suffices to fasten the memory of its occurrence upon the mind with such a dreadful force that no effort can efface the remembrance of it. The destructive violence of this storm exceeds in its power, fierceness, and grandeur all other phenomena of the atmosphere."

— John Park Finley, Tornadoes, 1887

Tornado damage to human-made structures is a result of the high wind velocity and windblown debris. Tornadic winds have been measured in excess of 300 mph (480 km/h). Tornadoes are a serious hazard to life and limb. As such, people in tornado-prone areas often adopt plans of action in case a tornado approaches.

== Tornadoes in society ==
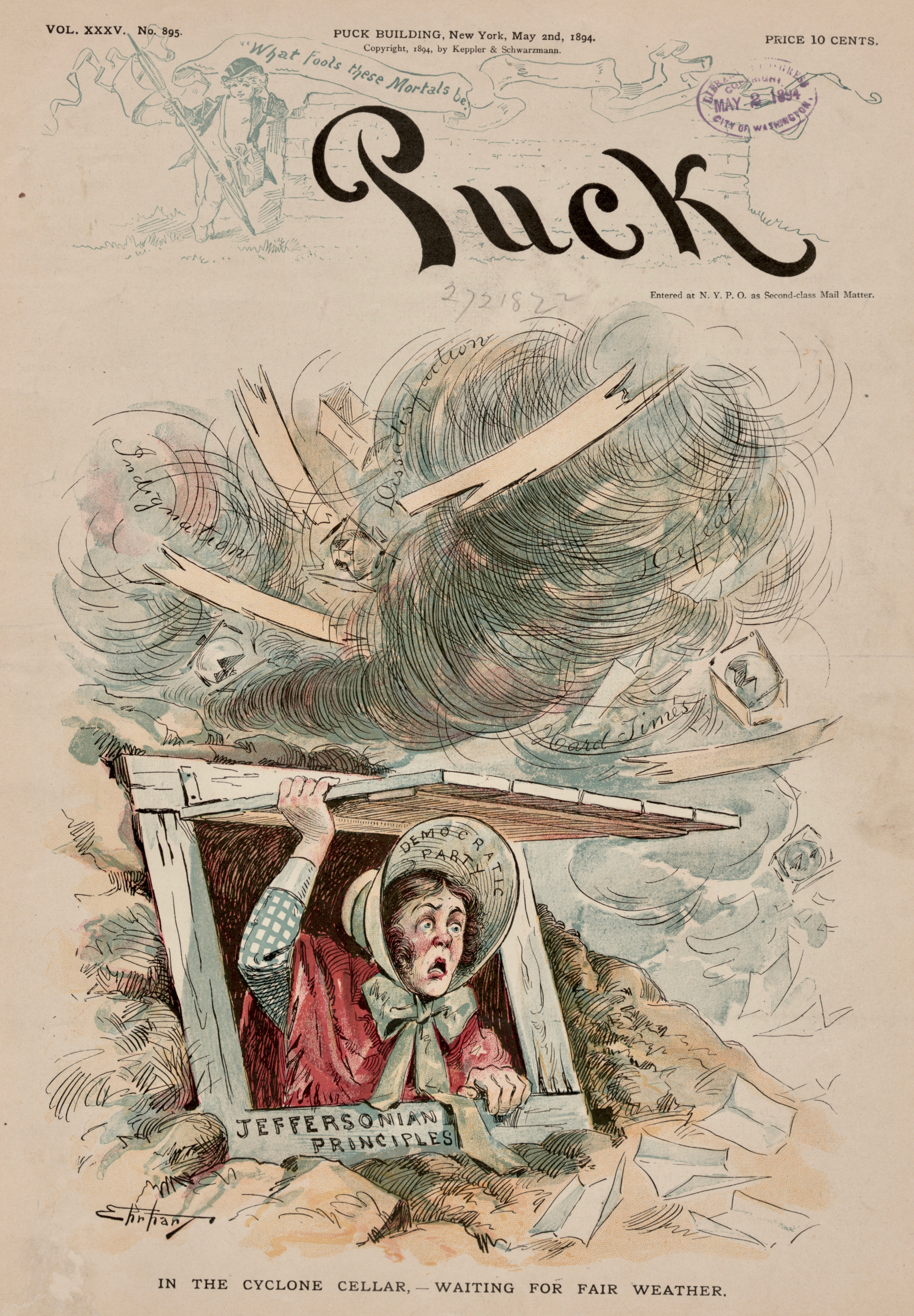
Cyclone as metaphor for political change in the 1894 United States elections; the farm woman taking shelter is labeled 'Democratic Party'. Puck magazine (1894)

Storm cellars are often used as a means of shelter in case of tornadoes or tropical cyclones. Common in tornado-prone areas, they have been around for more than 100 years—even referenced in the famous 1939 film The Wizard of Oz. Consisting either of a simple underground room, or an elaborate above-ground bunker, they are usually small rooms, designed to keep debris from entering and causing injury. When properly constructed, they can survive an EF5 tornado. While it is unknown how many lives have been saved by storm cellars, the number is undoubtedly high.

Some individuals and hobbyists, known as storm chasers, enjoy pursuing thunderstorms and tornadoes to explore their many visual and scientific aspects. Attempts have been made by some storm chasers from educational and scientific institutions to drop probes in the path of oncoming tornadoes in an effort to analyze the interior of the storms, but only about five drops have been successful since around 1990.

Due to the relative rarity and large scale of destructive power that tornadoes possess, their occurrence or the possibility that they may occur can often create what could be considered sensationalism in their reporting. This results in so-called weather wars, in which competing local media outlets, particularly TV news stations, engage in continually escalating technological one-upsmanship and drama in order to increase their market share. This is especially evident in tornado-prone markets, such as those in the Great Plains.

According to Environment Canada, the chances of being killed by a tornado are 12 million to 1 (12,000,000:1). One may revise this yearly and/or regionally, but the probability may be factually stated to be low. Regardless, tornadoes cause millions of dollars in damage, both economic and physical, many deaths, and hundreds of injuries every year. Though exceedingly rare, particularly damaging tornadoes have been known to cause upwards of several billion dollars in damages, such as the Joplin tornado. The tornado has been used by cartoonists for over 100 years as a metaphor for political upheaval. The storm cellar has also been used as a metaphor for seeking safety, as shown in the cartoon from 1894 at right.

According to political interpretations of The Wonderful Wizard of Oz, the tornado takes Dorothy to a utopia, the Land of Oz, and kills the Wicked Witch of the East, who had oppressed "the little people", the Munchkins.

A 1960s advertising campaign for the household cleaner Ajax claimed the product "Cleans like a white tornado".

Numerous athletic teams across the United States employ a tornado for their mascot. There are 124 high schools, colleges, and professional sports teams that use "Tornadoes," or a variant, as their team nicknames. Another 68 teams use "Cyclones" (a common colloquialism for "tornado" in parts of the U.S.) or a form thereof.

== Motion pictures with a tornado theme ==
- The Wizard of Oz (1939)
- Twister (1989)
- Mr. and Mrs. Bridge (1990)
- Night of the Twisters (1996), the first original motion picture made for The Family Channel loosely based on the 1984 Ivy Ruckman book of the same name
- Tornado! (1996)
- Twister (1996)
- Storm Chasers: Revenge of the Twister (1998)
- Atomic Twister (2001)
- The Day After Tomorrow (2004)
- Category 7: The End of the World (2005)
- Tornado Glory (2006)
- NYC: Tornado Terror (2008)
- The Sharknado series of films (2013–2018)
- Into the Storm (2014)
- Twisters (2024)

== See also ==
- List of tornadoes and tornado outbreaks
- Tornado myths
