= Ridgedale, West Virginia =

Ridgedale may refer to:

- Ridgedale, Hampshire County, West Virginia
- Ridgedale, Monongalia County, West Virginia, an unincorporated community in Monongalia County, West Virginia
