= Lani Billard =

Canadian actress and singer (born 1979)

- Born: 20 June 1979 (age 47); Toronto, Ontario, Canada
- Education: Unionville High School
- Occupations: Actress, Singer, Drummer
- Years active: 1992-present
- Known for: Ready or Not

Lani Billard (born 20 June 1979) is a Canadian actress, drummer, and singer, she is best known for her role in the 1990s as Elizabeth "Busy" Ramone on the Canadian television series Ready or Not from 1993 to 1997. Before her Ready or Not fame, she was frequently cast on a show called Friends of Research and Odd Gadgets F.R.O.G. a children's science series produced by Toronto's OWL-TV. F.R.O.G.s 30-minute episodes follow four pre-teens who examine the "whys" of science with animation and provide the latest news gathered by kids, documentary style. Billard has also appeared in Owning Mahowny, Bonds (a short film) Sarah Polley's award-winning film Stories We Tell documentary, Let's Rap (short film) & Saving Hope (TV series). While she acted with fellow castmate Laura Bertram on the Canadian Television series Ready or Not into Season 5, in 1996 she would appear with Bertram in the TV movie Sins of Silence for a brief scene.

Billard was raised Jewish and attended Unionville High School in Markham, Ontario, where she graduated in 1997.

Billard has since become a vocalist, singing independently and collaborating with Canadian acts such as iLL Vibe, L.S, & Grossman. She has provided backing vocals and drumming for her 'Ready Or Not' fellow castmate, Tamara Podemski for Podemski's group "Spirit Nation" which performs in Podemski's native Ojibwa language. Lani is professionally trained to play drums and percussion. She has a three-octave singing range.

== Personal life ==
When not performing, Billard practices reiki on animals. She stopped TV film appearances in 2017 until the reboot production for Ready or Not was announced as a teaser update on Billard's Instagram account on 28 May 2020. Billard is openly lesbian and has supported local LGBTQ events in Ontario for many years. Her Ready or Not tomboy character "Busy Ramone" is often referred to as a Canadian LGBTQ/lesbian icon, despite being written in the series as heterosexual.

== Filmography ==
Film and television
Year	Title	Role	Notes
1992	F.R.O.G.	Herself	Series
1993–1997	Ready or Not	Elizabeth "Busy" Ramone	65 episodes
1996	Sins of Silence	Girl (uncredited)	TV movie
2003	Owning Mahowny	Tori, The Teller	Film
2010	Bonds	Amy	Short film
2011	Deep Tissue	Herself	TV movie
2012	Stories We Tell	Susy Buchan	(Documentary)
2013	Let's Rap	Kids TV Exec	(Short)
2017	Saving Hope	Siobhan; episode: "Dr. Robot"	TV series
2020	Ready or Not Reboot	Elizabeth "Busy" Ramone	(TBA)
