= Tornado preparedness =

Safety precautions made before and during a tornado

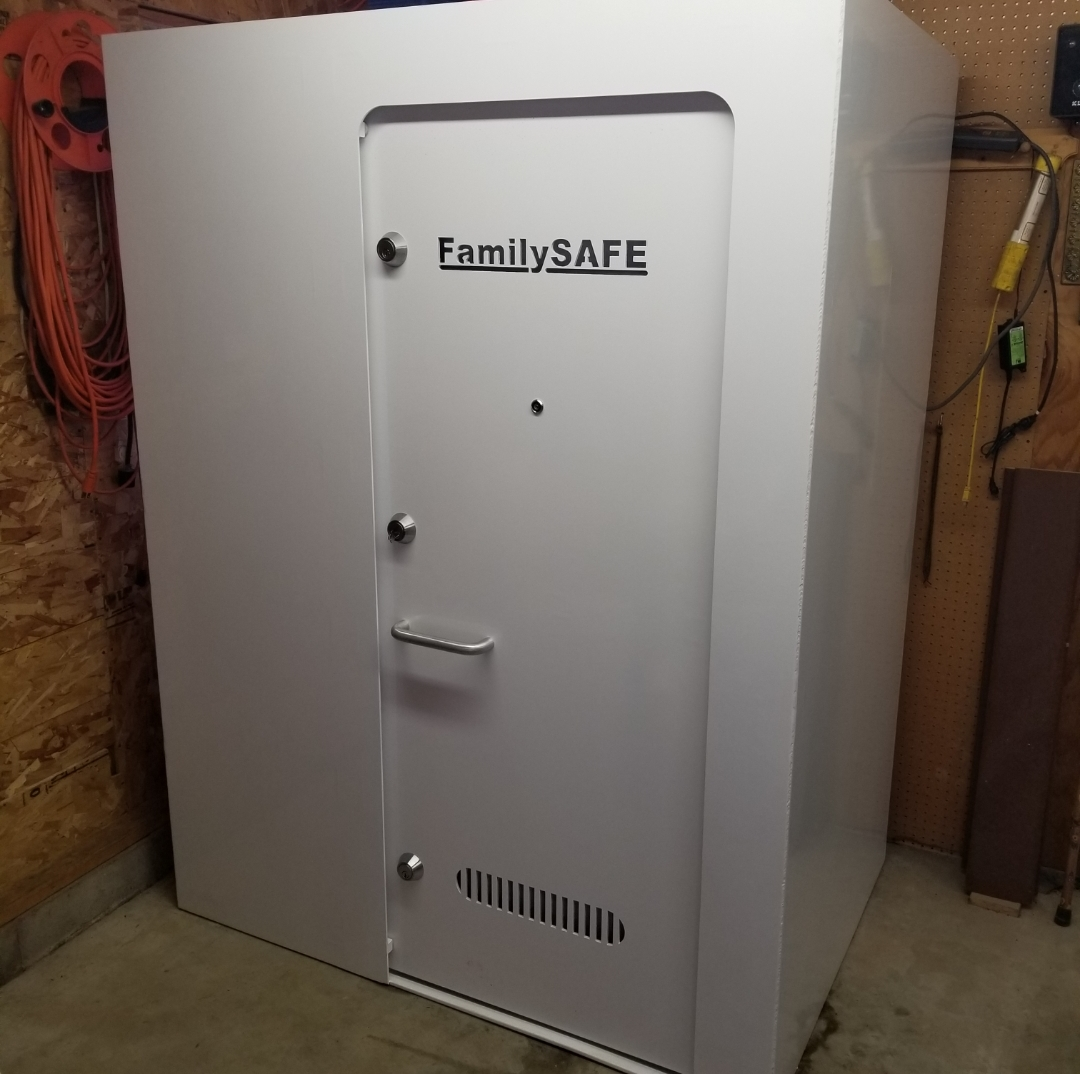
Modern above ground storm shelter

The term "tornado preparedness" refers to safety precautions made before the arrival of and during a tornado. Historically, the steps taken have varied greatly, depending on location, or time remaining before a tornado was expected. For example, in rural areas, people might prepare to enter an external storm cellar, in case the main building collapses, and thereby allow exit without needing rescue from the main building as in urban areas. Because tropical storms have spawned many tornadoes, hurricane preparations also involve tornadoes. The term "tornado preparedness" has been used by government agencies, emergency response groups, schools, insurance companies, and others.

== Dangers of tornadoes ==
Some tornadoes are the most violent storms in nature. Tornadoes have varied in strength, and some tornadoes have been mostly invisible due to a lack of loose dirt or debris in the funnel cloud. Spawned from severe thunderstorms, tornadoes have caused fatalities and devastated neighborhoods within seconds of arrival.

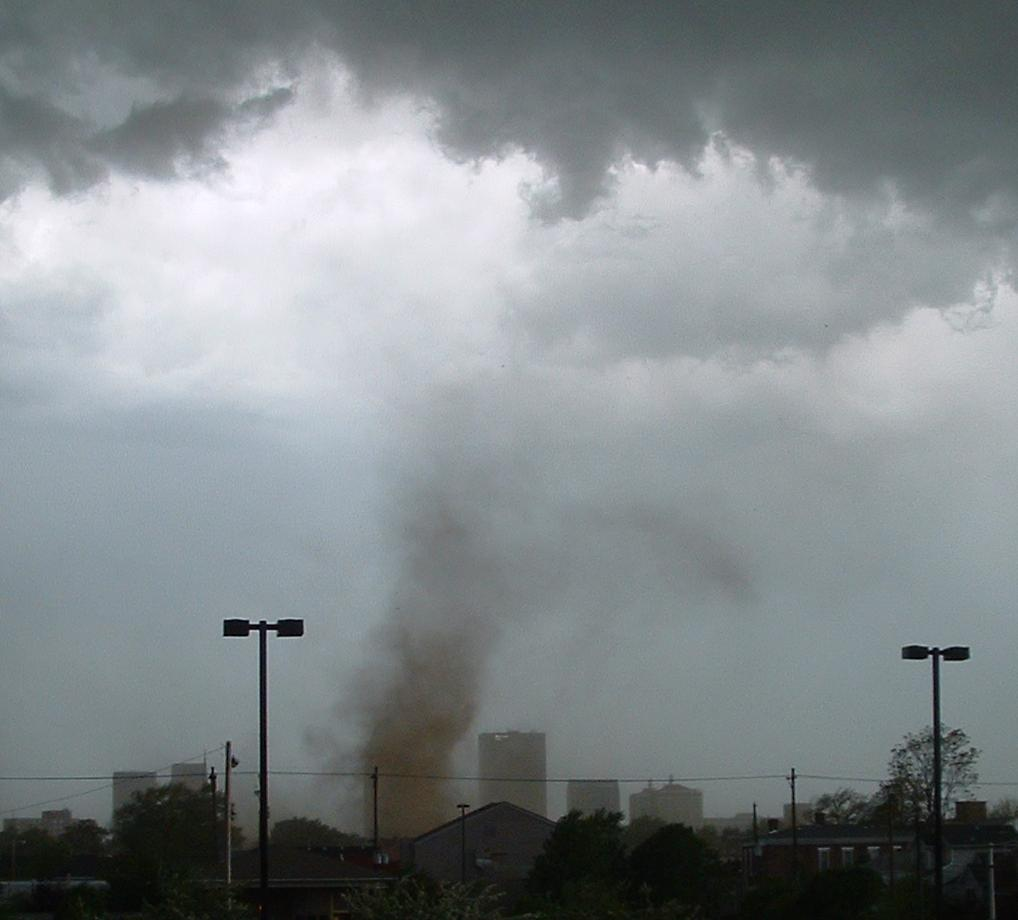
A tornado with no obvious funnel from the upper clouds, although the rotating dust cloud indicates strong winds at the surface.

A tornado operates as a rotating, funnel-shaped cloud that extends downward from a thunderstorm, to the ground, with swirling winds which have reached 300 miles per hour (480 km/h). The wind speed might be difficult to imagine: traveling the length of a U.S. football field within 1 second (over 130 meters or 430 feet per second). Damage paths have been in excess of one mile (1.6 km) wide and 50 miles long (80 km).

Not all tornadoes are easily seen. A tornado funnel can be transparent until reaching an area with loose dirt and debris. Also, some tornadoes have been seen against sunlit areas, but rain or nearby low-hanging clouds has obscured other tornadoes. Occasionally, tornadoes have developed so suddenly that little, if any, advance warning was possible.

Before a tornado strikes an area, the wind has been known to die down and the air to become very still. A cloud of debris has sometimes marked the bottom of a tornado even when the funnel was not visible. Tornadoes typically occur along the trailing edge of a thunderstorm.

The following is a summary of typical tornadoes:

- They may strike quickly, with little or no warning.
- They may appear nearly transparent until dust and debris are picked up or a cloud forms in the funnel.
- The average tornado moves southwest to northeast in the U.S., but tornadoes have been known to move in any direction.
- The average forward speed of a tornado is 30 miles per hour (48 km/h), but has varied from stationary to 70 mph (110 km/h).
- Tornadoes can also accompany tropical storms and hurricanes as they move onto land.
- Waterspouts are tornadoes that form over water.
- Tornadoes are most frequently reported east of the Rocky Mountains during spring and summer months.
- Peak tornado season in the southern U.S. states is March through May; in the northern states, it is late spring through early summer.
- Tornadoes are most likely to occur between 3 p.m. and 9 p.m. (local time), but it is possible for them to occur any time.

== Steps when expecting storms to arrive ==
The U.S. Federal Emergency Management Agency (FEMA) has advised the following precautions before a storm reaches an area:

- Be alert to the changing weather conditions.
- Listen to NOAA Weather Radio and/or Skywarn, or to local commercial radio or television newscasts for the latest information.
- Watch various common danger signs, including:

- large hail stones;
- a large, dark, low-lying cloud (particularly if rotating);
- loud roar of wind, sounding similar to a freight train.

Upon seeing an approaching storm or noticing any of the danger signs, they were advised to prepare to take shelter immediately, such as moving to a safe room, internal stairway, or other safe-haven area.

All individuals and families should have a disaster preparedness kit made prior to tornado. According to FEMA the kit should include items needed to shelter in place in the event of a disaster such as a tornado for up to 72 hours following impact.

== Actions taken during tornadoes ==
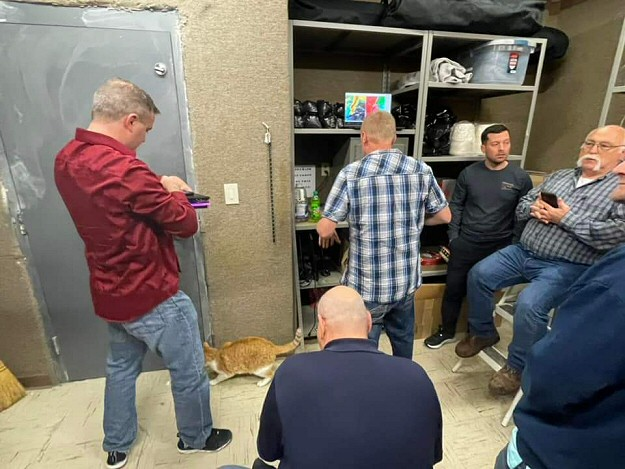
National Weather Service employees take cover as an intense tornado tracks less than 1 mi (1.6 km) south of them

Generally accepted tips to minimize risk of injury or death during and after a tornado include wearing sturdy shoes or boots, a helmet, long sleeves, gloves, and a heavy quilt or coat. These can offer extra protection from shards of glass, splinters and other airborne objects.

Ahead of an expected tornado outbreak, the Department of Homeland Security has outlined the following basic items as beneficial to have:

- Water
- Food
- Tools and emergency supplies
- First aid supplies
- Clothing and bedding
- Special needs items

In addition, they advise to refill and properly store prescription medicines, get some extra cash for when credit cards do not work, fill automobiles with fuel, stock extension cords and power strips, and to consider making motel/hotel reservations (at a location that is more than 50 miles) for several nights starting after the time of the tornado strike.

During August 2010, FEMA advised people to perform the following actions when a tornado struck.

Location	Action taken
In a structure (e.g., residence, small building, school, nursing home, hospital, factory, shopping center, high-rise building, restaurant)	They were to enter a pre-designated shelter area such as a safe room, basement, storm cellar, or the lowest building level. If there was no basement, then to the center of an interior room on the lowest level (closet, interior hallway) away from corners, windows, doors, and outside walls. The goal has been to put as many walls as possible between the safe room and the outside. They were advised to get under a sturdy table or other object and use arms to protect their head and neck, and not open windows.
In a vehicle, trailer, or mobile home	They were advised to leave immediately and enter the lowest floor of a sturdy, nearby building or a storm shelter. Mobile homes, even if tied down, offer little protection from tornadoes. If a car is flipped by high winds, there is also the danger of broken glass.
On the outside with no shelter	They were advised to lie flat in a nearby ditch or depression and cover head with their hands. Also, to beware of the potential for flooding there. They were advised to not stay under an overpass or bridge (where winds or debris might be funneled). It was safer to be in a low, flat location. The advice was to never try to outrun a tornado in urban or congested areas in a car or truck, but instead, to leave the vehicle immediately for safe shelter. Flying debris from tornadoes causes most fatalities and injuries.

Because some preparations vary, depending on location, people have been advised to consult their local area preparedness plans, rather than assume the plans are similar for all areas, such as which local buildings have been designated as storm shelters.

A 2012 study of tornado injuries found that wearing a helmet such as those used for American football or bicycling, is an effective way to reduce injuries and deaths from head trauma. As of 2012, the CDC endorsed only general head protection, but recommended that if helmets are to be used, they be kept close by to avoid wasting time searching for them.

After the 2013 Moore tornado, it became apparent that thousands of people attempt to flee major tornadoes, and this has been credited with reducing the death toll. However, during this event some people were killed as the tornado passed over the traffic jam caused by the impromptu evacuation. In addition to urban traffic, evacuation can also be hampered by flash flooding produced by associated thunderstorms, and the need to be certain about the position and direction of the tornado. Others who did not flee the Moore tornado were also killed because the buildings they were hiding in were completely destroyed, highlighting the need for storm shelters and safe rooms constructed specifically to withstand very high winds.

== Actions taken after tornadoes ==
Wear thick-soled shoes (or boots), long pants, and work gloves during cleanup.

Avoid injury from electric shock, electrocution, debris (nails, broken glass, sharp ends of broken wood), contaminated water, and carbon monoxide poisoning.

== Long-term preparations ==
Depending on location, various safe-haven areas have been prepared. The goal has been to avoid outer walls which might collapse when a roof section becomes airborne and the walls below lose their upper support: many interior rooms resist collapse longer, due to smaller walls interconnected to each other, while outer walls deflect the force of the winds. Because mobile homes typically lack foundation anchors and present a large surface-area sail (to catch wind), the advice has been to seek a safe haven elsewhere, such as in a stronger nearby building. When a mobile home begins to roll, people have been injured by hitting objects inside, or being crushed when a trailer suddenly hits the ground and begins to collapse around them.

In a multi-story building, an internal stairway (away from broken windows) often acts as a safe haven, due to the stairs reinforcing the walls and blocking any major debris falling from above. If a stairway is lined with windows, then there would be the danger of flying glass, so an interior stairway, or small inner room, would be preferable.

In private homes, some similar stairway rooms have been used, or an interior room/closet kept clear to quickly allow entry when a storm is seen or heard approaching (the wind roar intensifies, sounding like a swift "freight train" coming nearer, louder). With weeks or months to prepare, an interior safe room can be constructed, with space for emergency water, food and flashlights, and a telephone to call for rescue if the exit becomes blocked by falling debris. Some above-ground safe rooms have been built with steel-rebar rods in cement-filled cinder blocks, to withstand winds of 250 miles per hour (400 km/h). Rural homes might have an outside storm cellar, or other external bunker, to avoid being trapped within a collapsing house. In rural homes, generators are also helpful to maintain power with enough fuel for a few days.

There were no building codes requiring tornado shelters nor specifically designed to prevent tornado damage until the 2011 Joplin tornado prompted a local ordinance requiring hurricane ties or similar fasteners. The state of Oklahoma adopted the minimum U.S. standard that year for the first time, but did not add high-wind protections like those in Florida designed to protect against hurricanes. Other states in Tornado Alley have no statewide building codes. The National Association of Home Builders opposes even "safe rooms" on the basis of cost/reward. The chance of any given location in Tornado Alley getting hit by an F-2 tornado (strong enough to do major structural damage and exceeding the 90 mph guideline for straightline winds) is about 1 every 4,000-5,000 years; in other areas the annual probability is one in several million. The most stringent building codes only require earthquake strengthening for a 1 in every 500-1,000 year probability.

The U.S. Federal Emergency Management Agency has spent tens millions of dollars subsidizing the construction of shelters and safe rooms in both private and public buildings. Many buildings in Tornado Alley do not have basements, because unlike in more northern areas, there is no need for a deep foundation to get below the frost line, in some places the water table is high, and expansion and contraction of clay-heavy soils can produce additional pressure on buildings that can cause leaks if not reinforced.

North of the equator, tornadoes generally travel between a northerly and easterly direction and cause the most damage on the southwest corner of buildings and that the north side and northeast corner of buildings were safest. Professor Joseph Eagleman of the University of Kansas found that 75 percent of the homes hit were most damaged in the southwest corner. He found that the southwest corner and the south side were the least safe. South of the equator, the south side and the southeast corner were safest.

== Medical preparations ==
Having a first aid kit in the safe haven is advised to help victims recover from minor injuries. People needing prescription medications could have a medicine bag ready to take to shelter. Some people have reported their "ears popping" due to the change in air pressure, but those effects seem to be temporary. Covering people with mattresses or cushions has helped avoid injury from flying debris, as walls collapsed nearby.

Injuries sustained during a tornado vary in nature and in severity. The most common injuries experienced during a tornado are complex contaminated soft tissue wounds and account for more than 50% of the cases seen by emergency rooms following a tornado. These wounds will most likely be contaminated with soil and foreign bodies due to high wind speeds caused by tornadoes. Fractures are the second most common injury obtained after a tornado strikes and account for up to 30% of total injuries. Head injuries are also commonly reported during a tornado, but severe head injuries only account for less than 10% of the total. Even though only 10% of reported head injuries are severe, they are the most common cause of death following a tornado. Blunt trauma to the chest and abdomen are also injuries obtained following a tornado, but only account for less than 10% of overall injuries.

== Tornado drills ==
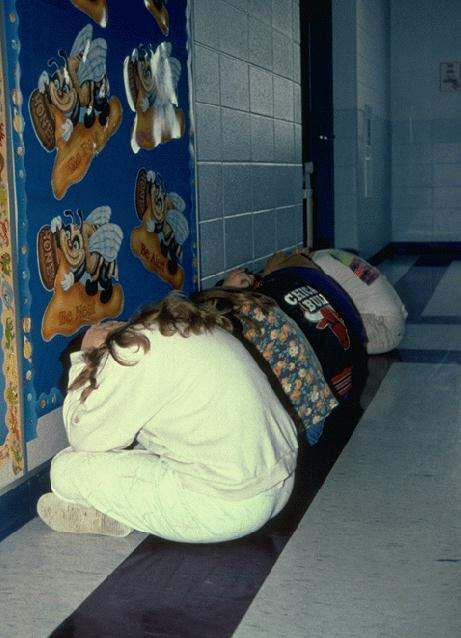
Students participate in a tornado drill, lining up along an interior wall and covering their heads.

Tornado drills (also known as severe weather drills) are an important element in tornado preparedness. Like any other safety drills, they increase chances of correct response to a real tornado threat.

Most states in the midwestern and southern United States conduct a statewide tornado drill in late winter or early spring in preparation for the severe weather season. During these drills, the National Weather Service issues test tornado warnings, and local Emergency Alert Systems and/or NOAA Weather Radio (normally as a Required Weekly Test or Required Monthly Test; Live Tornado Warning Codes can only be used if a waiver from the FCC is granted since "Live Code Testing" is prohibited per regulations) are activated along with outdoor warning sirens. Schools and businesses may also conduct a tornado drill simultaneously.

A tornado drill is a procedure of practicing to take cover in a specified location in the event that a tornado strikes an area. This safety drill is an important element of tornado preparedness.

Generally, a signal is given, such as a series of tones (ex. Continuous Tone), or a voice announcement. Upon receiving the signal, building occupants of schools, hospitals, factories, shopping centers, etc. proceed to a designated location, usually an interior room or corridor with no windows, and assume a protective position.

In homes and small buildings one must go to the basement or an interior room on the lowest floor (closet, bathroom), to stay away from glass.

Cars and mobile homes must be abandoned, if there is small chance to drive away.

In some jurisdictions, schools are required to conduct regular tornado drills, though generally less frequently than fire drills.

During school tornado drills students are required to huddle up against the walls (picture above) of the building usually the hallway to prevent harm to the students and sometimes staff (teachers, janitors, etc) will also huddle against the wall to prevent harm.

=== Tornado drills by state ===
In many states tornado drills are part of the Severe Weather Awareness Week.

- Alabama
- Florida
- Kansas
- Georgia
- Indiana
- Iowa
- Louisiana
- Ohio
- Oklahoma
- Michigan
- Minnesota
- Mississippi
- Missouri
- Texas
- Virginia
- Wisconsin
- North Carolina

== See also ==
- Tornado myths
- Derecho
- Secondary flow
- Tornadoes of 2026
- Cultural significance of tornadoes
- List of tropical cyclone-spawned tornadoes
- List of tornadoes and tornado outbreaks
- Whirlwind (atmospheric phenomenon)
- Microburst
- Emergency management
- Tropical cyclone warnings and watches
- Tornado watch
- Tornado warning
