= Ready or Not (Canadian TV series) =

1993 Canadian television series

- Series logo
- Created by: Alyse Rosenberg
- Starring: Laura Bertram; Lani Billard; Gail Kerbel; John Lefebvre; Diana Reis; Gerry Mendicino; Joseph Griffin; Fab Filippo; Jason Deline
- Composers: Asher Ettinger; Tony Kosinec
- Country of origin: Canada
- No. of seasons: 5
- No. of episodes: 65

Production
- Executive producers: John Brunton; Barbara Bowlby; Alyse Rosenberg
- Running time: 26 minutes
- Production company: Insight Production Company Ltd.

Original release
- Network: Global Television Network
- Release: April 3, 1993 – 1997

Series' title card

Ready or Not is a Canadian teen drama television series that aired on the Showtime Movie Channel (April 3, 1993 – 1997) and later on The Disney Channel (April 4, 1996 – 2000) and Global Television Network for five seasons and 65 episodes between 1993 and 1997 in both Canada and the United States.

The show centred on two adolescent girls and their friendship and coming-of-age, addressing difficult topics like divorce, racism, consent, and body image. In June 2021, it was announced the show is in preliminary development for a reboot series.

== Premise ==
The program follows two teenage girls in the suburbs of Toronto, best friends Amanda Zimm and Elizabeth "Busy" Ramone, throughout life's struggles as well as showcasing the different households they grew up in. Amanda is a Jewish Canadian only child raised by liberal former hippie parents including a mother that was into New Age philosophy and often tried to incorporate it into her parenting. Busy, in contrast, is from a more conservative and traditional Italian Canadian Catholic household with three older brothers. Busy and Amanda's personalities and interests are opposites; while Busy is a tomboy who drums and loves sports, Amanda is a girly girl who is boy crazy and dreams of being a model or actress. The series' five year run begins with the girls in grade 6 and ends with them graduating grade 9.

== Cast ==
=== Principals ===
- Laura Bertram as Amanda Zimm
- Lani Billard as Elizabeth "Busy" Ramone
- Gail Kerbel as Phyllis Zimm
- John Lefebvre as Leonard Zimm
- Diana Reis as Lucy Ramone
- Gerry Mendicino as Sam Ramone
- Joseph Griffin as Manuel "Manny" Ramone
- Fab Filippo as Dominick "Dom" Ramone (main, seasons 1–3; guest, season 5)
- Noah Plener as Francis "Frankie" Ramone

=== Recurring ===
- Benjamin Plener as Michael "Monkey Ears"
- Amy Smith as Chrissy Frazer (seasons 1 & 2)
- Jesse Nilsson as Justin (season 1)
- Matthew Moore as Emory (seasons 1 & 2)
- Omari Moore as Troy Edwards (seasons 1 & 2)
- Keram Malicki-Sanchez as "The Lizard", aka. "The Liz" (seasons 1, 3 & 4)
- Keith White as Petrocelli (seasons 1, 3 & 4)
- Karl Pruner as Stephen Bennett (seasons 4 & 5)
- Ross Hull as Danny Masters (seasons 2–3)
- Amos Crawley as Bernie Sagittarius "Sag" Chearney (seasons 3 & 4)
- Ryan Gosling as Matt Kalinsky (season 4)
- Jason Deline as Ernie Lipnit (season 4)
- Tamara Podemski as Carla (seasons 4 & 5)
- Kari Matchett as Sheila Ramone (seasons 4 & 5)
- Daniel Enright as Milan (season 5)

== Development ==
In 1988, Alyse Rosenberg wrote a pilot for a show based on her own experience of wearing a bra to school for the first time, saying, "I wrote the series so kids wouldn’t feel so alone. Adolescence is such an incredible period of life. It makes or breaks the sense of self". Two years later, Global Television Network showed interest in her pilot and agreed to produce it. The series originated as a short film, titled Thirty-Two Double A. Eventually the producers saw that the show had the potential to be popular and turned it into a series. Director and screenwriter Nicole Holofcener’s first professional job was writing for the show.

At the time of Ready or Not's original run, there were few shows that showed a realistic portrayal of adolescence. Speaking about the lack of programming for teens and pre-teens, Rosenberg said, “Television has a huge effect on teens, especially on girls, who can be made to feel completely inadequate. We are trying to offer alternative ways to navigate the rocky road of adolescence, without being cutesy". As the series creator and executive producer, Rosenberg "wanted to make sure that the show’s situations about real-life issues mirror real-life responses, which don’t always produce the happiest of endings," saying, "The world is not just black and white".

== Legacy ==
Ready or Not gained a cult following for being a rare show that depicted adolescence through the perspectives of two female best friends. Kathleen Newman-Bremang of Refinery29 wrote, “For a very specific demo (older Canadian millennials, mostly women), Ready or Not episodes are seared into our brains like Backstreet Boys lyrics or Spice Girls outfits.” The show was notable for depicting situations ranging from interracial relationships, homophobia, bullying, and peer pressure, “and for not shying away from conversations about sex or the societal expectations associated with it.”

It has been compared to My So-Called Life, another 1990s TV show that dealt with similar topics. Though the show Degrassi is the more well-known Canadian teen TV series, Newman-Bremang argued Ready or Not was at times more adept at “navigating life’s big problems with nuance,” commenting, “teen girls are often portrayed on television as one-note bratty caricatures, but Ready or Not gave us two with depth, and the show treated girlhood mistakes with the levity and gravitas they deserve.” In 1996, Ready or Not won a Gemini Award for best youth series. The show has been said to be in development for a reboot.

== Episodes ==
=== Season 1 (1993) ===
| No. overall | No. in season | Title | Directed by | Written by | Original release date |
|---|---|---|---|---|---|
| 1 | 1 | "Thirty-Two Double A" | Alyse Rosenberg | Alyse Rosenberg | April 3, 1993 |
After some attention from an older boy Amanda thinks she is ready for a bra, even though her breasts haven't developed. Once she gets to school however, she realizes maybe she's not.
| 2 | 2 | "Smoke Screen" | Graeme Campbell | Story by : Alyse Rosenberg; Teleplay by : Hart Hanson | 1993 |
Busy's brother Frankie starts hanging with a tough new crowd and smoking. After Busy tries to stop him, she decides to act like him in order to hang out with him again.
| 3 | 3 | "Model Perfect" | Sandy Wilson | Story by : Alyse Rosenberg; Teleplay by : Beverley Cooper | 1993 |
After joining the swim team, Amanda is wishing her body looked more like Chrissy’s. At home her parents try to lose weight for an upcoming high school reunion giving Amanda the idea to diet.
| 4 | 4 | "Busy's Curse" | Alyse Rosenberg | Story by : Alyse Rosenberg; Teleplay by : Nicole Holofcener | 1993 |
Busy starts her period. She doesn’t see becoming a woman as her mom and Amanda do and worries she won't be the same person she was before.
| 5 | 5 | "The Big Gulp" | Graeme Campbell | Alyse Rosenberg | 1993 |
Amanda and Busy crash Chrissy's girls-only slumber party, followed by Justin and his friends who drink too much and humiliate one of Justin's shy friends into playing a kissing game.
| 6 | 6 | "Members Only" | Stacey Stewart Curtis | Alyse Rosenberg | 1993 |
Chrissy's rich friends exclude her from a party at their country club. Wanting to show she can afford things they have, she lures Amanda into shoplifting a sweater with the promise of being shown how to be cool.
| 7 | 7 | "The Worst Thing That Happened and The Best Thing That Didn't" | Alyse Rosenberg | Story by : Alyse Rosenberg; Teleplay by : Marlene Matthews | 1993 |
After Busy's pregnant mom loses the baby, Busy blames herself and her family for not helping their mom around the house. Amanda asks her crush, Justin, to attend a party with her; but with the upcoming funeral she can't decide which to attend.
| 8 | 8 | "He Loves Me, He Loves Me Not" | Stacey Stewart Curtis | Story by : Alyse Rosenberg; Teleplay by : Nicole Holofcener | 1993 |
Busy develops a crush on her karate instructor, only to see him kiss another man. Busy wonders if that makes her gay and if being gay is wrong.
| 9 | 9 | "Double Talk" | Graeme Campbell | Story by : Alyse Rosenberg; Teleplay by : John May & Suzanne Bolch | 1993 |
On an overnight band trip, Amanda walks in on Chrissy and Justin in a closet. When the two do not return until morning, rumors spread. While Justin is praised, everyone calls Chrissy a slut.
| 10 | 10 | "Black or White or Maybe Grey" | Alyse Rosenberg | Story by : Alyse Rosenberg; Teleplay by : Nicole Holofcener | 1993 |
Troy gets a job working for Busy's dad. However, after money goes missing, Busy's father fires Troy and shows his racist side.
| 11 | 11 | "Origins of Man" | Stefan Scaini | Story by : Alyse Rosenberg; Teleplay by : Hart Hanson | 1993 |
Amanda is paired up with Michael to do a report of the origins of man but their religious upbringings conflict with evolution. Michael develops a crush on Amanda and learns about how boys reach puberty.
| 12 | 12 | "Wild Life" | Graeme Campbell | Marlene Matthews | 1993 |
A garage band catches the eye of both Amanda and Busy. Busy is asked to play drums but Amanda’s role as band manager is nothing but humiliating.
| 13 | 13 | "Tricky Kisses" | Alyse Rosenberg | Alyse Rosenberg | 1993 |
Busy's mother decides to move out to re-think her life. Amanda throws a party with the hopes of having her first kiss.

=== Season 2 (1994) ===
| No. overall | No. in season | Title | Directed by | Written by | Original release date |
|---|---|---|---|---|---|
| 14 | 1 | "Beyond the Birds and the Bees" | Stacey Stewart Curtis | Story by : Sheri Elwood; Teleplay by : Anna Bourque | 1994 |
While babysitting, the girls find a "guide to sex" book. In a panic, Amanda takes the book home and then to school. Michael then steals the book, photocopies it, then sells to students.
| 15 | 2 | "First Date" | Alyse Rosenberg | Alyse Rosenberg | 1994 |
Busy gets asked on a date by Troy. After taking advice from everyone, she decides to get dressed up and look more feminine.
| 16 | 3 | "Family Therapy" | Stacey Stewart Curtis | Story by : Alyse Rosenberg; Teleplay by : Nicole Holofcener | 1994 |
Busy's mom agrees to return home only if the family attends therapy together. Busy decides to take on the role as housewife in order to keep her mom from leaving again.
| 17 | 4 | "Poor Little Rich Girl" | Stefan Scaini | Story by : Alyse Rosenberg; Teleplay by : Sondra Kelly | 1994 |
When Amanda's father loses his job she decides to earn the money for new clothes herself by getting a job or winning a $1000 dance-a-thon contest.
| 18 | 5 | "A Little White Lie" | Stacey Stewart Curtis | Story by : Alyse Rosenberg; Teleplay by : Bill Murtagh | 1994 |
After winning tickets to a concert, Busy lies to Amanda in order to take Troy. Amanda, still wanting to go to the concert, asks her mom to pull a few strings to get some tickets.
| 19 | 6 | "White Girls Can't Jump" | Stefan Scaini | Story by : Alyse Rosenberg; Teleplay by : Peter Meech | 1994 |
Busy tries out for the senior basketball team. While in an argument with the black captain, she repeats comments her father made and is labeled a racist.
| 20 | 7 | "Break Up" | Stacey Stewart Curtis | Story by : Alyse Rosenberg; Teleplay by : Peter Mitchell | 1994 |
Amanda's father moves out. Unable to cope with the issues at home, Amanda decides to live in the mall.
| 21 | 8 | "Amanda's Romance" | Eleanore Lindo | Story by : Alyse Rosenberg; Teleplay by : Leila Basen | 1994 |
Amanda and her mother move into a new apartment, where she meets Danny. Unfortunately Danny's constant jokes and teasing goes too far.
| 22 | 9 | "Dear Troy" | Stefan Scaini | Story by : Alyse Rosenberg; Teleplay by : Ann-Marie MacDonald | 1994 |
Troy gives Busy a special ring. Busy is unsure about whether she is ready to be that close and avoids Troy.
| 23 | 10 | "The New Deal" | Alyse Rosenberg | Story by : Alyse Rosenberg; Teleplay by : Nicole Holofcener | 1994 |
Amanda's mom starts dating and it appears like she’s dating a different guy every night. After her mom poses nude in an art class, Amanda has had enough.
| 24 | 11 | "Monkey See, Monkey Do" | Allan King | Peter Mitchell and Alyse Rosenberg | 1994 |
Busy is asked by Peter, an aspiring rock star, to play the drum on his demo tape. However, while practicing at his house, Busy sees where Peter gets his abusive temper.
| 25 | 12 | "Flunky" | Stefan Scaini | Story by : Alyse Rosenberg; Teleplay by : Nicole Holofcener | 1994 |
When Chrissy is moved to the grade 7 English class, Amanda is asked to tutor her. In an attempt to brush off the teacher's pet persona, Amanda tries to be more cool.
| 26 | 13 | "Am I Perverted or What?" | Alyse Rosenberg | Story by : Alyse Rosenberg; Teleplay by : Leila Basen | 1994 |
When Amanda and Busy listen to a sex talk radio station, they believe that Busy's brother Dom is one of the callers and is having sex. Amanda thinks her curiosity of intimacy means she's a sex-crazed pervert.

=== Season 3 (1995) ===
| No. overall | No. in season | Title | Directed by | Written by | Original release date |
|---|---|---|---|---|---|
| 27 | 1 | "My Buddy Buddy" | Alyse Rosenberg | Alyse Rosenberg | 1995 |
Amanda and Busy go to summer camp only to find they were placed in different cabins. Amanda tries to fit in with her cabin by teasing a younger girl, Jessica.
| 28 | 2 | "The Last Hurrah" | Alan Kroeker | Susin Nielsen | 1995 |
While trying to steal the boys' flag, things take a turn for the worse. That same night, Amanda starts her period.
| 29 | 3 | "Tongue Tied" | Alyse Rosenberg | Alyse Rosenberg | 1995 |
After overhearing and misinterpreting the French-speaking boys staying at Amanda’s; Busy thinks her bust is too small and tries on different bras in the hopes one will make her more appealing.
| 30 | 4 | "Under One Roof" | Allan King | Alyse Rosenberg | 1995 |
Busy's band starts to influence her; she refuses to eat meat and pierces her nose creating a rift between her and her father. When the band finally lands a gig, it’s the same day as her family reunion.
| 31 | 5 | "Crossing the Line" | Joanna McIntyre | Anna Bourque | 1995 |
Busy and Amanda go to a sports park with Frankie. A guy Busy likes assaults her when they are alone. Amanda and Frankie kiss.
| 32 | 6 | "Three's a Crowd" | Allan King | Susin Nielsen | 1995 |
Busy begins to notice Amanda and Frankie's relationship and does not like it. Frankie gets teased for dating a younger girl.
| 33 | 7 | "Crater Face" | Alyse Rosenberg | Leila Basen | 1995 |
When Danny returns from New York with terrible acne, Amanda worries what everyone will think of her.
| 34 | 8 | "Thin Ice" | Peter Rowe | Alyse Rosenberg | 1995 |
A casting director picks Busy for an audition over Amanda for a commercial starring Kurt Browning.
| 35 | 9 | "Swear to God" | Alyse Rosenberg | Alyse Rosenberg | 1995 |
After being embarrassed for not knowing her religion (due in large part to being raised in a rather agnostic household), Amanda studies Judaism but is unsure if she can handle the abuse the other Jewish kids go through.
| 36 | 10 | "Just Friends" | E. Jane Thompson | Susin Nielsen | 1995 |
Busy's friend takes more interest in Amanda than her, so Busy attempts to change this.
| 37 | 11 | "Sweet Thirteen" | Joanna McIntyre | Susin Nielsen | 1995 |
Amanda is disappointed when she finds she hadn’t done the things she hoped she would have done by the time she turned 13. In an attempt to cross some things off her list, she invites some older kids over who promise to show her a good time.
| 38 | 12 | "Sister, Sister" | Joanna McIntyre | Sheri Elwood | 1995 |
Amanda's mother's boyfriend, Mel, invites Amanda and her mom over for the weekend to meet his daughter, but Amanda becomes jealous when her mom gives Mel's daughter special treatment. When someone mistakes the two as mother and daughter Amanda reaches her breaking point.
| 39 | 13 | "Nothing in Common" | Peter Rowe | Alyse Rosenberg | 1995 |
When Busy’s Uncle comes to visit, Amanda sees it as an opportunity to get her writings read by a real author, but when Busy loses Amanda's box of writings the two argue, deciding they have nothing in common, and stop being friends.

=== Season 4 (1996) ===
| No. overall | No. in season | Title | Directed by | Written by | Original air date |
|---|---|---|---|---|---|
| 40 | 1 | "First Day of Junior High" | Stacey Stewart Curtis | Dawn Ritchie | 1996 |
New to junior high, Busy is worried about being beat-up by the same family that attacked her brothers. Amanda hopes to become one of the popular girls.
| 41 | 2 | "The Grass is Greener" | Peter Rowe | Alyse Rosenberg | 1996 |
After complaining about how the other has it made, Busy and Amanda switch lives for the weekend.
| 42 | 3 | "Where Do I Belong?" | Allan Kroeker | Story by : Edwina Follows; Teleplay by : Barry Stevens | 1996 |
Busy's band decides to replace her with another drummer who's much better than she is.
| 43 | 4 | "Glamour Girl" | E. Jane Thompson | Story by : Alyse Rosenberg; Teleplay by : Anna Bourque | 1996 |
Amanda gets the chance to be a model, but it's not all what she expected and when she overhears the director say she would need a nose job Amanda debates whether or not she really wants to be a model.
| 44 | 5 | "I Do, I Don't" | Allan King | Dawn Ritchie | 1996 |
When Busy's brother gets married and moves into the family's house, she doesn't know how she feels about all the changes.
| 45 | 6 | "The Girlfriend" | Stacey Stewart Curtis | Story by : Edwina Follows; Teleplay by : Susin Nielsen | 1996 |
When Sag's old girlfriend moves back, Busy realizes she may have feelings for him. Amanda wants to try bungee jumping.
| 46 | 7 | "Prince Charming" | John L'Ecuyer | Alyse Rosenberg | 1996 |
Amanda develops a crush on her art teacher when she gets sick of living with her mother.
| 47 | 8 | "Family Album" | Allan Kroeker | Edgar Lyall | 1996 |
Amanda finds a photo of her father with another woman with whom she thinks he was cheating on her mother.
| 48 | 9 | "First Serious Party" | Alex Chapple | Story by : Sheri Elwood; Teleplay by : Barry Stevens | 1996 |
When Amanda's mom goes out of town, she hosts a party with non-alcoholic beer.
| 49 | 10 | "Heroes" | Stacey Stewart Curtis | Julie Lacey | 1996 |
A boy in a wheelchair joins the school, making Busy uncomfortable when he is around.
| 50 | 11 | "Warts and All" | Allan Kroeker | Story by : Anna Bourque; Teleplay by : Anita Kapila | 1996 |
When a group of girls invite Amanda out but not Busy, she decides to even the playing field by telling them about Amanda's wart.
| 51 | 12 | "Girls Night In" | E. Jane Thompson | Deborah Jarvis | 1996 |
Busy invites Amanda over to watch a racy softcore French film on video when everyone is out of the house. Unfortunately, her brother's interfering wife decides to come home early.
| 52 | 13 | "What's Yours is Mine" | Alan Goluboff | Story by : Dawn Ritchie; Teleplay by : Deborah Jarvis & Edgar Lyall | 1996 |
Amanda wants to attend an exclusive arts camp but with the deadline approaching she decides to use someone else's work as her own.

=== Season 5 (1997) ===
| No. overall | No. in season | Title | Directed by | Written by | Original release date |
|---|---|---|---|---|---|
| 53 | 1 | "Coming Home" | Alan Goluboff | Julie Lacey | 1997 |
Busy runs into Dom in town, who has not been home from college in weeks. She suspects something is wrong.
| 54 | 2 | "Your Fifteen Minutes are Up" | Alan Goluboff | Ann Macnaughton | 1997 |
Busy rescues a girl who fell in the river, and everyone wants to hear their story. However, Busy becomes overwhelmed with the sudden attention.
| 55 | 3 | "Cross My Heart" | Bruce McDonald | Alyse Rosenberg | 1997 |
Amanda is entrusted to babysit Steven's daughter when she would rather go to her acting group.
| 56 | 4 | "Your Own Money" | Allan King | Edwina Follows | 1997 |
Busy decides to get a real job so she can afford Steven's old keyboard. When her father finds out about it, he starts charging her rent and utilities.
| 57 | 5 | "Let Me Make My Own Mistakes" | Stephen Withrow | Sondra Kelly | 1997 |
Amanda's grades start dropping and it seems her involvement in the after-school arts program is the reason.
| 58 | 6 | "When a Kiss is Just a Kiss" | Roz Owen | Jennifer Cowan | 1997 |
Busy has a crush on two guys at the same time, and what she thinks is an innocent kiss was viewed by one of the guys.
| 59 | 7 | "Get a Life" | Alex Chapple | Barry Stevens | 1997 |
The girls are not aware they have the option to attend an arts high school. Amanda looks promising but Busy might have trouble getting in.
| 60 | 8 | "Saint Carla" | John L'ecuyer | Dawn Ritchie | 1997 |
A classmate dies in a car accident. Busy does not understand why she is not as upset as everyone else. Amanda is asked to take over Carla's lead role in the school play.
| 61 | 9 | "Graduation" | Alan Goluboff | Edgar Lyall | 1997 |
The girls graduate from grade 9. Amanda debates inviting her father, and Busy finds out the truth about her own father's high school education.
| 62 | 10 | "Second Generation" | John L'ecuyer | Barbara O'Kelly | 1997 |
While working the family hot dog stand, Busy meets the competition: the son of her father's rival.
| 63 | 11 | "All or Nothing" | Bruce McDonald | Edwina Follows | 1997 |
Amanda joins an animal rights group, but without the support of Milan, she thinks she may need to end the relationship.
| 64 | 12 | "Great is... Great" | Allan Kroeker | Ann Macnaughton | 1997 |
Amanda's mother finally marries Steven, making Amanda think of her own wedding and her feelings for Milan.
| 65 | 13 | "Hello, Goodbye" | Alyse Rosenberg | Alyse Rosenberg | 1997 |
Amanda has to move to the west coast, leaving Busy behind. An accident at a party held in an old building may change those plans forever. The episode also features a flashback revealing the girls' first meeting.

== Syndication ==
In the late 1990s, the Disney Channel began airing Ready or Not in syndication. However, certain episodes Disney felt were inappropriate for their audience, such as “Origins of Man” and “Am I Perverted or What?”, were not aired on the network.

== International broadcasts ==
- In Mexico, the show was dubbed into Spanish as "Tiempos inolvidables" and aired on Televisa from 1996 to 2001.
- In the Czech Republic, the show was dubbed into Czech as "Připraveny nebo ne" and aired in the late 1990s.
- In Australia, the show aired on ABC TV and was shown every Friday at 5:30pm. It debuted in 1994 and again aired from 1996 to 1998. It was also shown on weekday mornings at 11:30am during the school holidays between 1997 and 1998.
- In Nigeria, the show aired on RSTV, a regional TV channel serving the southern city of Portharcout and neighbouring states. It was shown on Friday at 5:00pm, at the end of a kids block known as K-Time. It aired in 2005 to 2006.
- In Brazil, the series was shown by Rede Globo, first on Saturday afternoons, in 1994, after Xuxa Park. Subsequently, it began to be shown in the early hours of Friday to Saturday.
- In Italy, the show was dubbed into Italian as "Siete pronti?" and aired on Junior TV from 1994 and on Disney Channel Italy in the late 1990s.
- In Germany, the show was dubbed into German as "Amanda & Betsy" and aired on ZDF from 1994 to 1997.
