= Blindside (film) =

- Directed by: Paul Lynch
- Written by: Richard Beattie
- Produced by: Peter R. Simpson
- Starring: Harvey Keitel
- Cinematography: Rene Ohashi
- Music by: Paul Zaza
- Release dates: August 28, 1987 (Montreal World Film Festival); June 29, 1988 (wide release)
- Running time: 98 minutes
- Country: Canada
- Language: English

Blindside is a 1987 Canadian film directed by Paul Lynch and starring Harvey Keitel.

== Plot ==
"A surveillance wizard becomes involved with the underworld after his wife's suicide."

Penfield Gruber is a former scientist and surveillance expert who resigned and now runs a neglected motel. Criminals offer him money to spy on a resident, under coercion.

== Cast ==
- Harvey Keitel as Penfield Gruber
- Lori Hallier as Julie
- Lolita Davidovich as Adele
- Michael Rudder as Freelong
- Cordelia Strube as Dolman
- Durango Coy as Borden
- Alan Fawcett as Gilchrist
- James Kidnie as Sandy

== Production ==
On 16 November 1986, filming began.

== Release ==
On 28 August 1987, was shown at Montreal World Film Festival, and released in United States.

== Reception ==
"...dull, Canadian-made thriller..."

"...it was never really intended to have a theatrical run..." — Paul Lynch
