= Ice (1998 film) =

1998 TV film by Jean de Segonzac

- Written by: Roderick Taylor; Bruce A. Taylor
- Directed by: Jean de Segonzac
- Starring: Grant Show; Udo Kier; Flex Alexander; Eva La Rue
- Music by: Lawrence Shragge
- Countries of origin: United States; Germany
- Original language: English

Production
- Producers: Don Enright; Laurie McLarty
- Cinematography: Mike Fash
- Editor: Ralph Brunjes
- Running time: 93 minutes

Original release
- Network: ABC; ProSieben
- Release: November 29, 1998

Ice is a 1998 television disaster film starring Grant Show, Udo Kier, Flex Alexander and Eva La Rue. The film has a premise similar to The Day After Tomorrow, a science fiction disaster film released six years later. Although completely in English, it first premiered in Germany in 1998 before being aired on ABC in the United States in 2000.

== Plot ==
An increase in sunspot activity causes disastrous, long-term consequences for the Earth. Los Angeles is, just as the rest of the world, covered with a layer of ice and snow. The government has collapsed and everyone is on their own. Chaos and crime prevails. Together with scientist Dr. Kistler - who is certain that this is the onset of a new Ice Age and that these conditions will not pass for another decade - and a small group of survivors, LAPD officer Robert Drake leaves in the direction of Long Beach Harbor to meet with a government ship which will take them to Guam, where it is warmer.

On the way, Kistler's car freezes over and then a police car hits him. Then the journey becomes a highly dangerous one. Moreover, what Kistler has not told them is that the ship is only coming to pick him up.

== Cast ==
- Grant Show as Robert Drake
- Udo Kier as Dr. Norman Kistler
- Eva LaRue as Alison
- Flex Alexander as Kelvin
- Audie England as Julie
- Michael Riley as Greg
- Kyle Fairlie as Max
- Art Hindle as US President
- Diego Fuentes as Zapata
- Kristin Booth as Jessica
- Gordon Michael Woolvett as Soldier
- John Bourgeois as Dr. Golding
- Elias Zarou as Dr. Tyson
- Peter Virgile as Chief of Staff
- J.C. Kenny as Newscaster

== See also ==
- List of disaster films
