= Lori Hallier =

Canadian actress (born 1959)

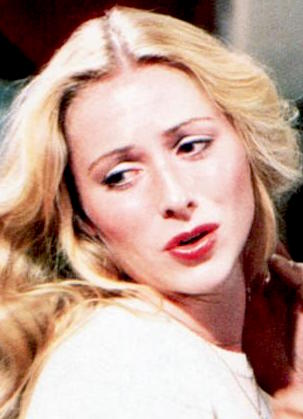
- Hallier in My Bloody Valentine (1981)
- Born: Lori Hallier; July 8, 1959 (age 67); Victoria, British Columbia, Canada
- Education: University of Victoria; National Theatre School
- Occupation: Actress
- Years active: 1980–present
- Known for: My Bloody Valentine; Santa Barbara; Days of Our Lives

Lori Hallier (born July 8, 1959) is a Canadian film, stage, and television actress. She made her film debut in 1981, starring as Sarah Mercer in George Mihalka's slasher film My Bloody Valentine (1981). She subsequently starred in Warning Sign (1985), Night of the Twisters (1996), My Name Is Tanino (2002), and Monte Walsh (2003). Hallier had a recurring role as Shannon Pressman in the television series Santa Barbara (1990). In 2017, Hallier portrayed Alice in the Netflix comedy film Christmas Inheritance.

== Early life ==
Hallier was born July 8, 1959, in Victoria, British Columbia, to Gerry and Vivian Hallier. She has a sister, Kerry, and a brother, Dale. Hallier was raised in Victoria, where she attended the Reynolds Secondary School. She studied theatre for two years at the University of Victoria before graduating from the National Theatre School in Montreal in 1980.

According to the autobiography of former British Columbia Premier John Horgan, Hallier and he were in the same class from Grade 1 to Grade 12, and in Grade 1 were voted King and Queen of Hearts on Valentine's Day.

== Career ==
Hallier made her film debut as Sarah Mercer in the 1981 cult classic slasher film My Bloody Valentine. After filming My Bloody Valentine in Nova Scotia, Hallier returned to Victoria, where she appeared in stage productions for the Bastion Theatre Company, as well as a production of Names and Nicknames with Richard Margison.

In 1982, Hallier appeared in a short-run Showtime soap opera entitled Love at the Crossroads, opposite George Touliatos, Eve Crawford, and Vivian Reis, in which she portrays Michelle, a starlet attempting to make it in Hollywood. A review of the series in the Akron Beacon Journal dismissed the series, but noted: "Lori Hallier and Eve Crawford vindicate themselves despite the horrid script; their performances are better than those in most daytime soaps."

The following year, she appeared in two episodes of the Canadian series Loving Friends and Perfect Couples, after which she relocated to Los Angeles, California, to pursue further work in television. She made appearances on several 1980s American television series such as The Dukes of Hazzard, Trapper John, M.D., and Simon & Simon. In 1986, Hallier co-starred with Harvey Keitel in the thriller Blindside, and in 1989, she appeared as Yvette on the popular soap opera Days of Our Lives, following this role with a recurring role as Shannon Pressman on the daytime drama Santa Barbara in 1990.

In 1996, Hallier appeared in the horror film Night of the Twisters. After appearing in the television movies Leona Helmsley: The Queen of Mean and A Woman Scorned: The Betty Broderick Story, Hallier became associated with supernatural and science fiction through her work on series such as Star Trek: Voyager and Poltergeist: The Legacy in 1997.

In 2000, she portrayed Joanna Lanier in the television series In a Heartbeat. That same year, she appeared in Thomas and the Magic Railroad as the mother of Lily (played by Mara Wilson). In 2002, she was cast in the film My Name Is Tanino. The following year, she starred in the popular Canadian program Strange Days at Blake Holsey High, followed by a supporting role in the Western Monte Walsh (2003), opposite Tom Selleck and Isabella Rossellini. In 2008, she appeared in a supporting role in the Canadian-produced miniseries The Summitt, opposite Bruce Greenwood, Christopher Plummer, and Wendy Crewson.

In 2017, Hallier portrayed Alice in the Netflix comedy film Christmas Inheritance, opposite Eliza Taylor, Jake Lacy, and Andie MacDowell.

== Personal life ==
Hallier lived in Los Angeles for 17 years after relocating there in the mid-1980s. In a 2009 interview, she recalled: "I went on a lark and drove around in a rented convertible and lived the high life. My hair turned white, my skin turned brown. I had big hair, shoulder pads, big earrings. The '80s were a fun time... [but Los Angeles] is a torture chamber of expectations." As of 2009, she resided in Toronto, Ontario.

== Filmography ==
=== Film ===
Year	Title	Role	Notes
1981	My Bloody Valentine	Sarah Mercer	
1985	Warning Sign	TV Reporter	
1987	Blindside	Julie	
1987	The Gunfighters	Sally Wells	Television film
1988	Higher Education	Nicole Hubert	
1990	Leona Helmsley: The Queen of Mean	Sarah	Television film
1992	A Woman Scorned: The Betty Broderick Story	Joan	Television film
1995	Picture Perfect	Amanda Holt	
1996	No One Could Protect Her	Carol	
1996	Night of the Twisters	Laura Hatch	Television film
1996	Moonshine Highway	Rose	Television film
1996	Buried Secrets	Cynthia	Television film
1998	Running Wild	Rachel Thompson	Television film
1998	Recipe for Revenge	Sophie Westin	Television film
2000	All-American Girl: The Mary Kay Letourneau Story	Jan Griffin	Television film
2000	Thomas and the Magic Railroad	Lily's Mother	
2000	The Other Me	Mom	Television film
2002	My Name Is Tanino	Leslie Garfield	
2003	Monte Walsh	Mary Wilder	
2003	Ghost Cat	Brenda	Television film
2006	Heartstopper	Mrs. Wexler	
2006	Black Widower	Marie Wagner	
2008	Bull	Volk	
2012	Christmas with Holly	Liz Cooper	Television film
2016	Flower Shop Mystery: Mum's the Word	Mrs. Ryan	Television film
2013	A Fish Story	Funeral Director	
2017	Christmas Inheritance	Alice	Television film
2018	SKIN	Nancy Morgan	
2018	Christmas in Love	Marian Carlingson	Television film
2019	Astronaut	Ventura Mission Control	
2019	Our Christmas Love Song	Anne	Television film

=== Television ===
Year	Title	Role	Notes
1980	Bizarre	Various Characters	
1982	Love at the Crossroads	Michelle	6 episodes
1982	Seeing Things	Elizabeth	Episode: "Looking Back"
1983	Loving Friends and Perfect Couples	Ann	2 episodes
1983	Trapper John, M.D.	Dr. Elizabeth Amber	Episode: "Old Man Liver"
1984	The Dukes of Hazzard	Dr. Debbie Davis	Episode: "Dr. Jekyll and Mr. Duke"
1984	Cover Up	Lady Abigail Babcock	Episode: "Writer's Block"
1984	Matt Houston	Nora Fulton	Episode: "The Honeymoon Murders"
1987	Alfred Hitchcock Presents	Samantha Cook	Episode: "If the Shoe Fits"
1987	Diamonds	Zoe Chapman	Episode: "There Once Was a Lady from Kathmandu"
1987–1988	Adderly	Anna Korman / Ruth	2 episodes
1987–1988	Night Heat	Terry Morrison / Sandra Lane	2 episodes
1988	Simon & Simon	Kristen Forne / McCafferty	Episode: "Second Swell"
1988	The Twilight Zone	Tom's Secretary	Episode: "Appointment on Route 17"
1988–1990	War of the Worlds	Mindy Cooper / Teri	2 episodes
1988–1990	Friday's Curse	Helen Garrett / Jennifer	2 episodes
1989	Street Legal	Danielle St. John	Episode: "Film Noir"
1989-1990	Days of Our Lives	Yvette Dupres	48 episodes
1990	Santa Barbara	Shannon Pressman	16 episodes
1990	The Hitchhiker	Sherri	Episode: "New Dawn"
1991	Civil Wars	'Cricket' Pillman	Episode: "A Long, Fat Frontal Presentation"
1991–1992	Jake and the Fatman	Carolyn Lloyd / Taylor Peters / Meghann Peters	3 episodes
1991–1993	Tropical Heat	Kerra Lane / Madge	2 episodes
1992	Katts and Dog	Unknown	Episode: "Falling Out Among Thieves"
1992	Forever Knight	Lyn Fiori	Episode: "Dead Issue"
1992–1993	Secret Service	Springer / Young	2 episodes
1993	Matlock	Janet Moore	Episode: "The Defendant"
1993–1996	Kung Fu: The Legend Continues	Kimberly St. Clair / Marilyn	2 episodes
1994	RoboCop: The Series	Tori Tolin	Episode: "When Justice Fails"
1996	Side Effects	Candice Saunders	Episode: "Sex, Death, and Rock & Roll"
1997	Star Trek: Voyager	Dr. Riley Frazier	Episode: "Unity"
1997	Poltergeist: The Legacy	Angeline D'Arcy	Episode: "Ransom"
1998	The Wonderful World of Disney	Sally Jeffries	Episode: "Mr. Headmistress"
1999	The City	Marsha Hensen	Episode: "Departures"
1999	Total Recall 2070	Barbara Raymond	Episode: "Infiltration"
1999	PSI Factor: Chronicles of the Paranormal	Hannah Griffin	Episode: "John Doe"
1999	Twice in a Lifetime	Julie's Mother	Episode: "Double Exposure"
2000	Honey, I Shrunk the Kids: The TV Show	Persia McQueen	Episode: "Honey, I'm the Wrong Arm of the Law"
2000–2001	In a Heartbeat	Joanna Lanier	7 episodes
2002	Doc	Gail Black	Episode: "Busy Man"
2002	The 5th Quadrant	Judy Mathis	Episode: "American Psychokinesis"
2002	Body & Soul	Melissa Hunt	Episode: "Letting Go"
2003	Blue Murder	Miranda Burke	Episode: "Boy Band"
2003	Sue Thomas: F.B.Eye	Betty Vanderwylen	2 episodes
2004	Bury the Lead	Gemma Jane	Episode: "The Revenge Specialist"
2002–2006	Strange Days at Blake Holsey High	Kelly Trent	4 episodes
2008	The Summit	Ditchburn	Miniseries; 2 episodes
2009	Flashpoint	Dr. Redfield	Episode: "Exit Wounds"
2012	Rookie Blue	Nicole Marshall	Episode: "The Girlfriend Experience"
2014	Sensitive Skin	Ashotep IX	Episode: "The Mummy"
