= Laura Bertram =

Canadian actress (b. 1978)

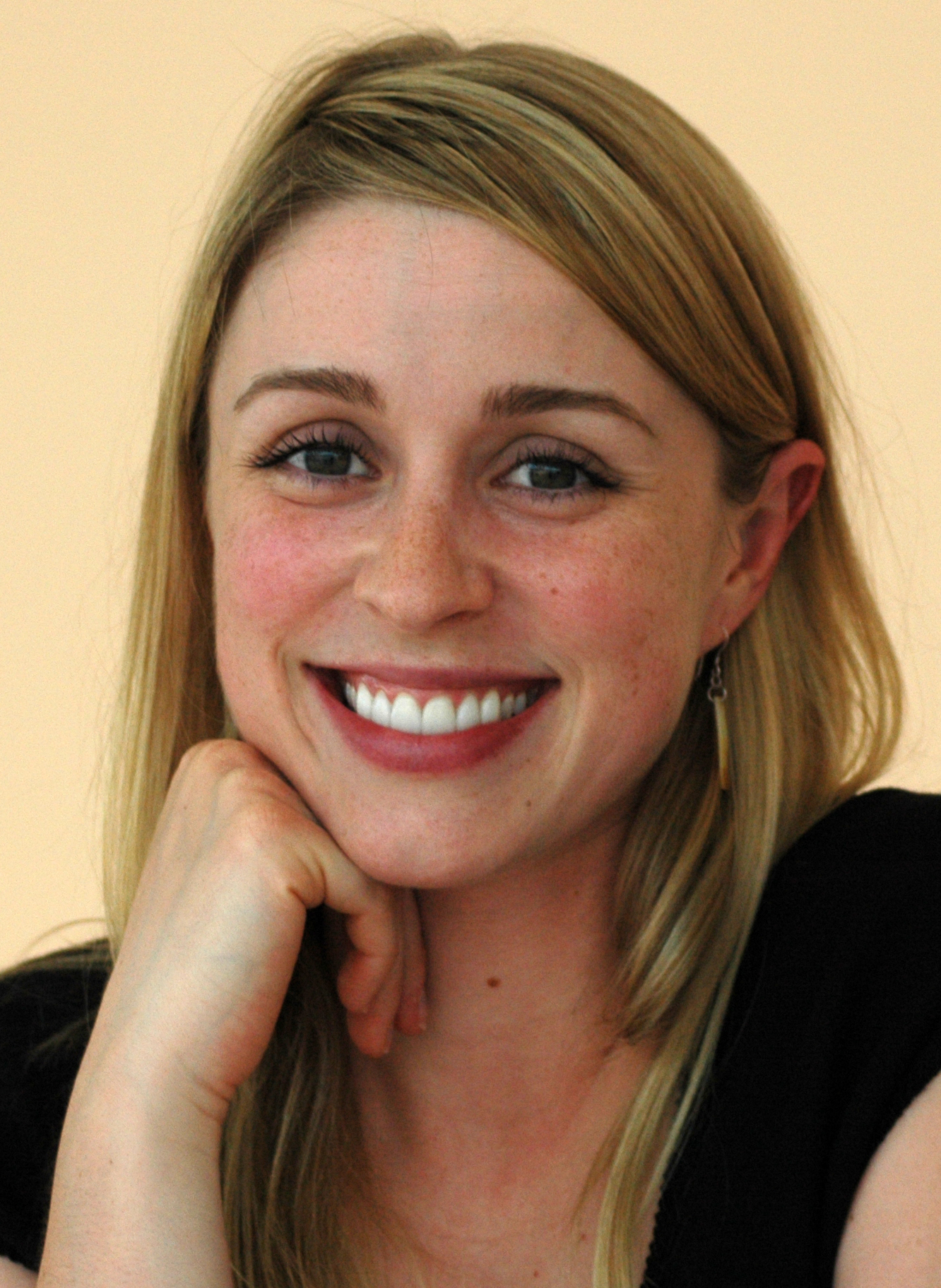
- Bertram in June 2007
- Born: Laura Maureen Bertram; 5 September 1978 (age 48); Toronto, Ontario, Canada
- Education: University of Guelph
- Occupations: Actress, teacher
- Years active: 1992–present
- Known for: Ready or Not; Andromeda
- Spouse: Yes
- Children: 2
- Awards: Gemini Award (X2)

Laura Maureen Bertram (born 5 September 1978) is a Canadian actress best known for her roles as Amanda Zimm in Ready or Not and Trance Gemini in Andromeda.

== Life and career ==
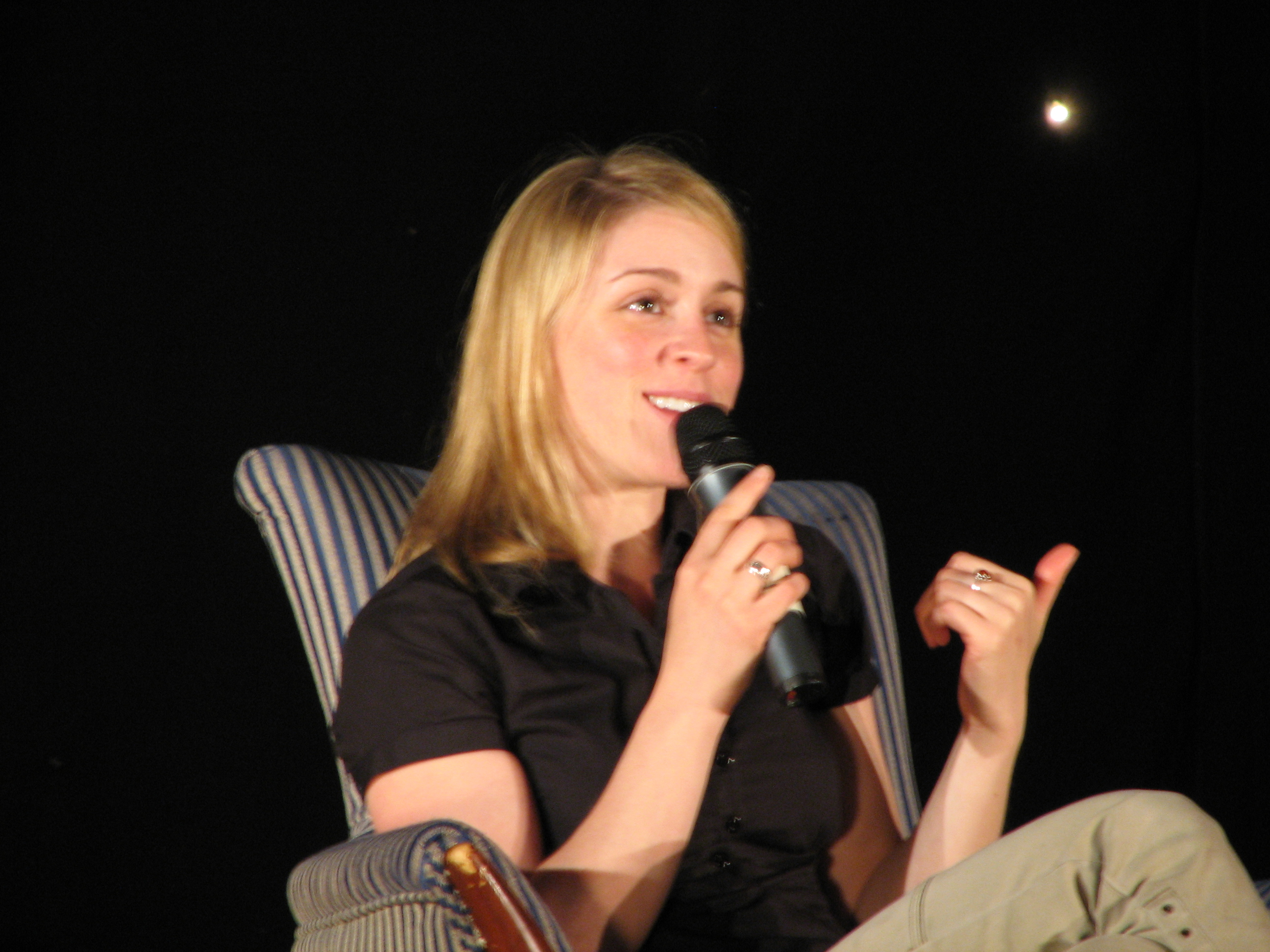
Actress Laura Bertram at Decalogy 10 in 2007

Bertram was born in Toronto, Ontario, and lives in Vancouver, British Columbia. She earned her degree in history from the University of Guelph. She has two younger sisters who are former actresses. In 1997, Bertram was a ceramics instructor at Kilcoo Camp. She also used to sing in the Canadian Children's Opera Chorus.

Her credits include the TV series Ready or Not, Are You Afraid of the Dark?, Seasons of Love, Andromeda as Trance Gemini, Supernatural, and the movies Night of the Twisters, and Dear America: So Far From Home. She appeared in Season 2 of Robson Arms.

Bertram was a high school teacher; in addition, she also taught young actors at Biz Studio in Vancouver.

Bertram is married with two children.

== Awards ==
Bertram has won two Gemini Awards for "Best Performance in a Children's or Youth Program or Series" for Ready or Not in 1995 and for "Best Performance in a Children's or Youth Program or Series" for Ready or Not in 1998.

She has also been nominated for two Gemini Awards for "Best Performance in a Children's or Youth Program or Series" for Ready or Not in 1996 and for Best Performance by an Actress in a Leading Role in a Dramatic Program or Mini-Series for Platinum in 1998.

== Filmography ==
=== Film ===
Year	Title	Role	Notes
1998	Elimination Dance		Short
2004	1974	Girl	Short
2005	A Nice Cup of Tea		Short
2006	Fracture	Holly	Video short
2008	Control Alt Delete	Sarah	
2008	Toxic Skies	Anna	
2010	Gunless	Alice	
2010	Punkin	Laura Lippy	Short
2011	50/50	Claire	
2011	Traveling at the Speed of Life	Josee	
2012	Random Acts of Romance	Holly	
2017	Mystic: A Murder Mystery	The Narrator	

=== Television ===
Year	Title	Role	Notes
1992, 1995	Are You Afraid of the Dark?	Amanda Cameron / Laurel	Episodes: "The Tale of the Lonely Ghost", "The Tale of the Mystical Mirror"
1993	Family Pictures	Nina (12-15)	TV miniseries
1993	Kung Fu: The Legend Continues	Young Valerie	Episode: "Reunion"
1993	Street Legal	Karen Brandis	Episode: "What's Love Got to Do With It?"
1993–1997	Ready or Not	Amanda Zimm	Lead role
1994	Road to Avonlea	Adeline Hodgson	Episode: "Someone to Believe In"
1996	The Boys Next Door	Cashier	TV film
1996	Night of the Twisters	Stacey Jones	TV film
1996	Sins of Silence	Carrie	TV film
1997	Wind at My Back	Suzanne Nelson	Episode: "Back in My Arms Again"
1997	Fast Track	Laurie	Episode: "The Race Fan"
1997	Platinum	Jessica Webb	TV film
1997	Deepwater Black	Aurora	Episode: "Aurora"
1998	Twitch City	Babe	Episode: "My Pet, My Hero"
1999	Dear America: So Far from Home	Mary Driscoll	TV film
1999	Seasons of Love	Judith Brewster	Episodes: "1.1", "1.2"
2000–2005	Andromeda	Trance Gemini	Main role
2001	Soul Food	Melissa Greene	Episode: "Life Lessons"
2006	Murder on Pleasant Drive	Janice II	TV film
2006	Veiled Truth	Kimberly	TV film
2007	Robson Arms	Chris Colton	Main role (season 2)
2008	Bridal Fever	Tina	TV film
2010	Supernatural	Corey's Roommate	Episode: "You Can't Handle the Truth"
2010	The Good Witch's Gift	Betty	TV film
2010	The Cult	Dina	TV film
2011	Once Upon a Time	Donna	Episode: "That Still Small Voice"
2014	Arctic Air	Megan	Episode: "On the Edge"
2014–2015	When Calls the Heart	Mary Dunbar	Recurring role (seasons 1–2)
2016	A Wish for Christmas	Nicole	TV film
2017	Signed, Sealed, Delivered: Home Again	Peggy	TV film
2018	Winter's Dream	Lindsay	TV film
2019	Unspeakable	Kelly Girard	TV miniseries
2019	Are You Afraid of the Dark?	Story Mother	Episode: "Submitted for Approval"
2020	Christmas Tree in Colorado	Phoebe	TV film
2021	Family Law	Karen	Episode: "Parenthood"
2023	Blessings of Christmas	Janet	TV film

== Awards and nominations ==
Year	Award	Category	Production	Result	Ref.
1995	Gemini Award	Best Performance in a Children's or Youth Program or Series	Ready or Not (for episode #2.13: "Am I Perverted or What?")	Won	
1996	Gemini Award	Best Performance in a Children's or Youth Program or Series	Ready or Not (for episode #3.7: "Crater Face")	Nominated	
1998	Gemini Award	Best Performance in a Children's or Youth Program or Series	Ready or Not (for episode #5.9: "Graduation")	Won	
1998	Gemini Award	Best Performance by an Actress in a Leading Role in a Dramatic Program or Miniseries	Platinum	Nominated	
2003	Leo Award	Dramatic Series: Best Supporting Performance – Female	Andromeda (for episode #3.12: "The Dark Backward")	Nominated	
