= David Ferry (actor) =

Canadian actor and theatre director

- Occupations: Actor, theatre director
- Years active: 1978–present

David Ferry is a Canadian actor and Dora Award–winning theatre director.

Ferry was nominated for a Genie Award, for best supporting actor in Hounds of Notre Dame. He was also star of the popular Canadian radio programme Midnight Cab. He was born in St. John's, Newfoundland.

== Filmography ==
- 1978 High-Ballin'
- 1979 Parallels
- 1980 Powderheads
- 1980 The Hounds of Notre Dame
- 1989 The Last Winter
- 1995 Darkman II: The Return of Durant
- 1996 Night of the Twisters
- 1998 Glory & Honor
- 1999 Resurrection
- 1999 The Boondock Saints
- 1999 Storm of the Century
- 2000 The Crossing
- 2006 Man of the Year
- 2009 The Boondock Saints II: All Saints Day
- 2018 The Detail
- 2020 The Oak Room
