= Night of the Twisters (film) =

1996 American television film directed by Timothy Bond

- DVD cover
- Genre: Action; Drama; Family
- Based on: Night of the Twisters by Ivy Ruckman
- Written by: Sam Graham; Chris Hubbell
- Directed by: Timothy Bond
- Starring: Devon Sawa; Amos Crawley; John Schneider; Lori Hallier; Laura Bertram; David Ferry
- Music by: Lawrence Shragge
- Countries of origin: Canada; United States
- Original language: English

Production
- Executive producers: William F. Burns; Anne Marie La Traverse; Wayne Rogers
- Producers: Michael Lambermont; Stephen Roloff; Sean Ryerson
- Production locations: Kleinburg, Ontario, Canada
- Cinematography: Peter Benison
- Editor: Gary L. Smith
- Running time: 92 minutes
- Production companies: MTM Enterprises; Atlantis Communications; PorchLight Entertainment; International Family Entertainment, Inc.

Original release
- Network: The Family Channel
- Release: February 11, 1996

Night of the Twisters is a 1996 made-for-television disaster film that was directed by Timothy Bond. The film premiered on The Family Channel (now Freeform) on February 11, 1996, as the cable channel's first original movie (and appeared on the channel until 2004, under its successor brands Fox Family and ABC Family).

Filmed in Kleinburg, Ontario, Canada, it is based loosely on the 1984 young-adult novel of the same title by Ivy Ruckman, itself a semi-fictionalized account of an outbreak of seven tornadoes that struck Grand Island, Nebraska on June 3, 1980, which killed five people and injured 134 others; the film adaptation, however, is set in the fictional Nebraska town of Blainsworth, which serves as a stand-in for Grand Island. The film centers on a family's struggle to survive a night as a bizarre tornado-producing supercell thunderstorm tracks into and becomes stationary over their town.

== Plot ==
At 1:16 p.m. on a Fall afternoon in 1996, Bob Iverson, a storm chaser with the Kansas State Tornado Center relaying information to the National Weather Service on a chase assignment, is driving down a country road in rural Central Nebraska to track a supercell thunderstorm. While observing the storm, Bob spots a tornado touching down almost a mile south of his location; he warns a family living nearby, right as their daughter Sarah, arrives home from school, about the oncoming twister, which sends them running into their root cellar before it destroys their farm.

Meanwhile, in Blainsworth (120 miles (190 km) southwest of the first tornado's location), aspiring teenage artist Danny Hatch, who is constantly being pushed by his stepfather, Jack (a former football star who owns a struggling sporting goods store), to be an athlete, damages his bike while participating in a bicycle race at the town's fall festival and falls behind the other racers; Jack pushes Danny into finishing the race nonetheless. Danny then wins a new bike in a raffle held by the local bank. While Danny tries out his new bike, he and his best friend Arthur Darlington run into Arthur's sisters, teenager Stacey (whom Dan has a crush on and has been put in charge of her siblings while their parents are on a trip back home in California) and preteen Ronnie Vae. The boys arrive at Danny's house as his mother Laura is making dinner; with Laura leaving for her waitressing shift at the Salty Dawg diner and Jack out running errands until sundown (having arranged for Danny's aunt Jenny, a claims adjuster, to drive her sister Laura to work in his place), Laura asks Dan to babysit his infant half-brother, Ryan.

At 3:37 p.m., while continuing to track the severe weather creeping toward the town, Bob decides to head southwest into Blainsworth, as Stan, the meteorologist Bob is radioing to, is astonished at the anticyclonic weather pattern for the fall. Early that evening, as the storm reaches town, Bob meets Laura while getting coffee at the diner. Not long after arriving home, Jack—after seeing a KHAS-12 weather bulletin about a tornado warning for rural Howard County, including the nearby towns of St. Paul and Dannebrog—leaves to check on his mother Belle, Danny's grandmother, who was asleep in her rocking chair when he called to alert her about a tornado spotted just 14 miles (23 km) northwest of Blainsworth. Tornado sirens then blare throughout town, only to cut off twice as Danny goes to get Ryan from his crib. A violent tornado then hits Blainsworth's Capital Heights neighborhood, with the noises emitting from the drains throughout the house notifying Dan and Arthur of its arrival; they and Ryan take cover in the basement bathroom's shower tub as the twister obliterates the Hatch residence.

Danny and Arthur escape from the basement through the collapsing beams where the first floor once stood. The boys leave the demolished house to find Arthur's sisters, and soon run into Stacey and Ronnie Vae, who survived the twister in the Darlington's now-wrecked home. The group stumbles upon the body of the town bank's manager, who was killed by the tornado, and decide to take his abandoned car to go search for Danny's family. Laura and Jenny are trapped inside the tornado-ravaged diner, where they took cover after Jenny's car malfunctions upon arriving to pick up Laura from work. Danny and Stacey, who evaded a police blockade to reach Belle's farm to find Jack (and left Arthur and Ronnie Vae behind to be escorted by police to a nearby shelter), find a wounded Belle underneath wooden boards blown off the barn near her house, which survived intact.

As Danny and Stacey rush to get Belle treated for her injuries, Dan finds Jack pinned underneath his overturned truck, which is covered in fallen power lines, on a closed road. After Danny and Stacey's initial attempt to free Jack nearly injures him further, Dan pulls him out from under the truck with the help of emergency crews; instead of being an opportunity for him to see Dan as reliable, Jack just gives his stepson a simple thank-you for rescuing him. Laura and Jenny—who were rescued before Jack and Danny get to the diner to look for them—are brought to the town's community center, where Laura struggles to locate her family and Jenny forms a connection with Bob; they are later forced to take cover as three tornadoes touch down nearby. Later at the shelter, Danny reveals to Stacey that Jack is only his stepfather and that his real father, pilot Daniel Sr., died in a plane crash when Danny was 6. After confessing that he feels he is not good enough in Jack's eyes and acknowledging his stepfather's good qualities, Stacey helps Danny consider that the two could try to find common ground.

Danny sneaks himself and Ryan into the Jeep loaned to Jack, who volunteered to bring a replacement two-way transmitter to the community center, to go look for Laura with him. Just after Bob drives Jenny and Laura over to the destroyed house to search for Jack, Danny and Ryan, the Jeep arrives in the driveway and the family is reunited. Three tornadoes then touch down nearby, forcing them to try to escape in their vehicles. The twister that trails behind them lifts a car belonging to a family from the Hatches’ neighborhood who attempted to outrun it, destroys buildings in its path and hurls a large tree branch into the Jeep's windshield, knocking Jack unconscious and prompting Danny to take over driving them out of the storm's path. The Hatches, along with Bob and Jenny, reach an overpass, where the twister blows out the Jeep's back window and nearly sucks Danny out before it dissipates. As they walk out from under the overpass just as the sun rises on a clear day after the storm passes, Jack admits he is proud of Danny.

One year after the storm, Danny is dating Stacey; Arthur became class president; Bob and Jenny got married and are preparing for the birth of their twins; Jack, now supportive of Danny, became a high school football coach and took up new hobbies after the storm destroyed his shop; and Belle died soon after visiting the family. Danny admits that surviving the storm made him appreciate living life to the fullest.

== Cast ==
- Devon Sawa as Danny Hatch
- John Schneider as Jack Hatch
- Lori Hallier as Laura Hatch
- David Ferry as Bob Iverson
- Helen Hughes as Grandma Belle "Zephyr" Hatch
- Amos Crawley as Arthur Darlington
- Laura Bertram as Stacey Darlington
- Jhene Erwin as Jenny Hatch
- Alex and Thomas Lastewka as Ryan Hatch

== Reception ==
At the time of the film's release in 1996, Night of the Twisters received positive ratings when it aired on The Family Channel, but received very poor reviews from critics, many of whom criticized the special effects used in the film. The Family Channel continued to air the film until 2004, under its Fox Family and ABC Family brands. The Movie Aired in Canada on CTV on May 4, 1997.

== Availability ==
Night of the Twisters was released on VHS by GoodTimes Entertainment and MTM Home Video shortly after its television release. As VHS became less popular, the film was re-released on DVD by GT Media in 2006.
