= Ridgedale, Monongalia County, West Virginia =

Ridgedale
- Unincorporated community
- Location within the state of West Virginia Ridgedale (the United States)
- Coordinates: 39°32′49″N 79°56′8″W
- Country: United States
- State: West Virginia
- County: Monongalia
- Elevation: 1,529 ft (466 m)
- Time zone: UTC-5 (Eastern (EST))
  - Summer (DST): UTC-4 (EDT)
- GNIS ID: 1555479

Ridgedale is an unincorporated community in Monongalia County, West Virginia, United States.
