= Ivy Ruckman =

American novelist (1931–2021)

Ivy Ruckman (May 25, 1931 – June 8, 2021), formally Iva Mae Myers Ruckman, was an American author of books for children and young adults. Her works include Melba the Brain and Night of the Twisters, inspired by a 1980 tornado event, the latter of which was made into a 1996 movie. Night of the Twisters was a best seller. A graduate of Hastings College, Ruckman lived in Salt Lake City, Utah.

Ivy died on June 8, 2021. She was 90 years old.
