= Stargate Universe season 2 =

Stargate Universe
- Season 2
- DVD cover
- No. of episodes: 20

Release
- Original network: Syfy
- Original release: September 28, 2010 – May 17, 2011

Season chronology
- ← Previous; Season 1

The second and final season of Stargate Universe was announced by Syfy on December 13, 2009. Like the first season, the second season consisted of 20 episodes. The series was moved from the franchise's long history of Friday to Tuesday, along with Caprica, as Syfy had picked up WWE Friday Night SmackDown. The series resumed on September 28, 2009, USA. In Ireland & UK, the series resumed on October 5 at 9pm on Sky1 and Sky1 HD.

Syfy announced on December 16, 2010, that it would not be picking Stargate Universe up for a third season and that the Spring 2011 season would be the last to air on its channel.

== Main cast ==
- Starring Robert Carlyle as Dr. Nicholas Rush
- Louis Ferreira as Colonel Everett Young
- Brian J. Smith as First Lieutenant Matthew Scott
- Elyse Levesque as Chloe Armstrong
- David Blue as Eli Wallace
- Alaina Huffman as First Lieutenant Tamara Johansen
- With Jamil Walker Smith as Master Sergeant Ronald Greer
- And Ming-Na as Camile Wray

== Episodes ==
Episodes in bold are continuous episodes, where the story spans over 2 or more episodes.

No. overall	No. in season	Title	Directed by	Written by	Original release date	US viewers (millions)
21	1	"**Intervention**"	Andy Mikita	Joseph Mallozzi & Paul Mullie	September 28, 2010	1.175
Colonel Young and the crew continue to clash with the Lucian Alliance soldiers over control of the Destiny, while the unconscious Lt. Johansen experiences a vision about her unborn child. Most of the crew is dumped on a passing planet. Telford continues to pretend to be on the Lucian Alliance's side, attempting to help Young and the crew. Eventually, after Kiva dies of her wounds and one of the Lucian Alliance members kills her insane replacement Dannic, Rush, Eli, Brody and Chloe are able to force the rest to surrender, retaking the ship.
22	2	"Aftermath"	William Waring	Robert C. Cooper	October 5, 2010	1.070
Rush finds Destiny's bridge, but keeps it a secret. With the ship low on food and extra (Lucian Alliance) mouths to feed, Rush uses bridge commands to drop out of FTL and send a shuttle to investigate a dangerous planet that Destiny wanted to ignore. While Young and Wray argue over the future of the Alliance captives, the shuttle crashes on the planet while Destiny prepares to jump to FTL. The team finds and re-activates the planet's Stargate. All but a small number of Alliance members are abandoned on the planet, but Hunter Riley, who is mortally wounded in the crash, dies after asking Young to end his suffering.
23	3	"Awakening"	Andy Mikita	Joseph Mallozzi & Paul Mullie	October 12, 2010	1.222
The Destiny docks with an ancient Stargate-seeding ship. Rush, Eli, and the scientists try to link the ships' power together to dial Earth, while Scott and Greer explore the ship. The group encounters an alien and tries to befriend it. When Col. Young decides to capture the alien, the alien escapes and the other aliens that were with it decide to reverse the energy transfer, interrupting the dialing and threatening to leave Destiny power-drained and adrift. Eventually Rush manages to unlink the two ships in time, but Telford is left behind.
24	4	"Pathogen"	Robert Carlyle	Carl Binder	October 19, 2010	0.974
Eli and Scott realize Chloe is acting strangely, prompting a thorough investigation of possible alien control over her. Eli is called to Earth to deal with his ailing mother, while Young grants Lucian Alliance prisoners limited freedom of movement throughout the ship. After investigating the alien influence over Chloe, Rush stages a "cure" for her, intending to reassure the rest of the crew while using her enhanced intelligence for his own ends.
25	5	"Cloverdale"	Alex Chapple	Brad Wright	October 26, 2010	1.012
Matthew Scott is infected by a plant-like alien organism and hallucinates a life on earth involving the rest of the Destiny crew. Reluctant to bring the infection back to the ship, Johansen and Rush try to find a cure for Scott's infection on the planet while Greer leads a team defending their position against the aggressive plants. Chloe's alien infection protects her from infection by the plants, and a transfusion ultimately cures Scott, but leaves them both under suspicion of alien influence.
26	6	"Trial and Error"	Andy Mikita	Joseph Mallozzi & Paul Mullie	November 2, 2010	0.967
Young has a series of vivid dreams, wherein the aliens who infected Chloe surround Destiny and destroy the ship no matter how he responds to their demands. Young questions his sanity and confides in Wray. Meanwhile, Eli is working with Ginn, the Lucian Alliance scientist, and Greer challenges Eli to act on her attraction to him. The ship drops out of FTL with no countdown clock, and while Scott attempts to rouse Young from his alcohol-fueled slump, Eli discovers that the ship has been running a series of combat simulations that mirror Young's dreams. The crew prepares for an attack, but once Young accepts Scott's challenge and arrives to take charge of the defenses, the ship jumps back to FTL. Brody and Volker believe Destiny has decided that Young is now the proper commander, while the jump to FTL was actually prompted by Rush, working from the still-secret bridge.
27	7	"**The Greater Good**"	William Waring	Carl Binder	November 9, 2010	1.074
Rush and Young investigate an abandoned alien craft adrift just outside Destiny, accidentally activating its engines. Ginn travels to earth while Dr. Perry comes aboard via the Ancient communication stones to assist with Rush's "maneuvering calculations". After she follows Rush's coded instructions to the bridge, Eli, Volker, and Brody follow. While Young and Rush awkwardly await rescue, Rush tells Young the Destiny's mission is actually to explore an anomaly in the background radiation of the universe and asks for his help to complete the mission. Simeon escapes from his guard and is seen menacing Dr. Perry in Ginn's body.
28	8	"**Malice**"	Robert C. Cooper	Robert C. Cooper	November 16, 2010	1.025
Simeon makes his escape from Destiny after killing Ginn/Amanda Perry and taking Dr. Park hostage, with Rush in hot pursuit. Young orders Scott, Greer, and James to retrieve Simeon alive from the planet as he may have information about a Lucian Alliance attack on Earth, but Rush kills him anyway, apparently in grief at the loss of Dr Perry. Meanwhile, Eli, Brody, and Volker try to override the bridge controls and buy time for the manhunt by keeping Destiny from jumping away. Chloe, with her enhanced alien intelligence and equations Rush has had her solving as recreation, is able to fly Destiny back to retrieve Rush.
29	9	"Visitation"	William Waring	Remi Aubuchon	November 23, 2010	1.169
Destiny exits FTL to find a shuttle alongside. They rapidly ascertain that it is the one left behind on planet Eden ("Faith"), complete with the personnel who had stayed behind on the planet. Young, Greer, and the rest of the crew instantly sense something "off" in the new arrivals, who have few memories of their life on the planet. Wray begins interviewing them under hypnosis, after one returnee dies mysteriously. While TJ searches for a medical answer, Chloe continues to physically transform, and begins to record her goodbyes via Kino.
30	10	"**Resurgence**"	William Waring	Joseph Mallozzi & Paul Mullie	November 30, 2010	1.094
With their new-found control over Destiny, Rush convinces Young that they should investigate a faint energy reading well off Destiny's flight path—a decision that will cause them deadly harm throughout the remainder of the series. The crew finds a destroyed alien fleet and the "cluster" of automated drones that defeated it. When Destiny's FTL drives are knocked out by the drone cluster, Telford arrives in a seed ship to help and accounts his experience with the "Ursini" aliens after being left on the seed ship ("Awakening"). Eli is approached by several people looking to help him deal with the loss of Ginn. Chloe escapes her quarters after beating a guard outside her room and is found working at a terminal saying it's too late for something.
31	11	"**Deliverance**"	Peter DeLuise	Joseph Mallozzi & Paul Mullie	March 8, 2011	1.035
Destiny is locked in a battle with a drone "cluster" and surprised that Chloe has contacted the aliens who abducted her in "Space (part 1)". The aliens engage the drones, allowing Destiny to destroy the command ship. The Ursini aliens, on the seed ship, send a message that contacting their lost colony has alerted a second drone cluster. This cluster has destroyed the Ursini colony, leaving those on the seed ship the last of their species. The Destiny crew study an inert drone while Chloe is sent to the "Space (part 1)" aliens to reverse her transformation—in return for Destiny's help against the coming drones. When the drone cluster arrives, Chloe's aliens leave while the Ursini sacrifice themselves and the seed ship to buy Destiny time. When Eli and Rush reactivate the remnants of the first cluster of drones and turn them on the second, Destiny is able to limp into FTL. Chloe's body is restored, though she confides to Rush that she still has enhanced mental abilities.
32	12	"Twin Destinies"	Peter DeLuise	Brad Wright	March 15, 2011	0.928
Eli suggests that he's found a way to dial the Stargate home to Earth, stirring excitement amongst the crew. But Rush has reservations about the plan. Everything seems to be going according to plan when a Rush from twelve hours in the future shows up to warn them not to try it as it killed everyone but himself and Telford (who made it back to present-day Earth) in the future he came from. The crew raids the future Destiny for parts and supplies for their own ship, but Future Rush accidentally kills present Telford in a fit of rage and remains behind to use the interface chair as future Destiny falls into a star and is destroyed.
33	13	"Alliances"	Peter DeLuise	Linda McGibney	March 22, 2011	0.814
After switching bodies with Senator Michaels and Doctor Andrew Covel, Camile Wray and Sgt. Greer are trapped within the rubble of Homeworld Command after an attack by a cloaked Lucian Alliance cargo ship. Michaels and Covel conduct reviews of the viability of another Icarus-like effort and Rush's signal findings, respectively. On Earth, Wray, Greer, and an airman named Evans fail to escape the building, but discover high radiation levels consistent with an unexploded naquadria bomb. Wray exposes Evans as an Alliance plant and Greer shoots him. They reach the bomb, but are unable to disarm it. The crew uses an FTL jump to sever the connection for a few seconds so Varro can tell Wray and Greer how to defuse the bomb, but he runs out of time. Varro then instructs Michaels and Covel what to do and Rush severs the connection. It is unclear if they succeeded, as communication stone contact with Homeworld Command remains severed.
34	14	"Hope"	William Waring	Carl Binder	March 29, 2011	0.876
When Chloe falls asleep during her turn awaiting contact with Earth, her body is possessed by Ginn, whose mind survived after she was strangled while using the Ancient communication stones ("The Greater Good"). Ginn is unaware of her death and experiences unexplained choking incidents. As Ginn grows weaker, Chloe and eventually Amanda Perry resurface, alternating control of Chloe's body. Ginn and Perry are uploaded to the Destiny's mainframe using the chair interface, but a power surge during the upload knocks out systems across the ship. Volker has been diagnosed with end-stage renal disease which requires a kidney transplant from Greer, who is a match. With no stones connection to Earth to get a surgeon, TJ attempts the transplant using information from the Ancient database. The power surge knocks out her access to the database, but Perry, now part of the ship, uses her connection to the database to guide TJ through the rest of the surgery. Perry and Ginn appear to Rush and Eli, respectively. Finally, a connection to Earth is established and Telford informs the crew that the bomb at Homeworld Security ("Alliances") was successfully disarmed.
35	15	"Seizure"	Helen Shaver	Remi Aubuchon	April 5, 2011	0.823
After an Earth negotiating team led by Richard Woolsey fails to convince the Langarans to allow an attempt to dial Destiny from their naquadria-rich home planet, Telford suspects they have cut a deal with the Lucian Alliance. Telford and Young plot a daring operation to test Rodney McKay's new dialing protocols, which he asserts solve the problems which led to the destruction of the two previous planets upon dialing Destiny's nine-chevron address. When McKay comes aboard Destiny to confer with Eli, Rush is found unresponsive in the interface chair, having uploaded his consciousness into the ship's computer where he shares a simulation with Amanda Perry. The earth team gains control of the naquadria-powered Stargate by a communication stone subterfuge that allows Young to co-opt the Langaran administrator's body, but the ruse is detected before McKay can finish dialing Destiny. After Rush and Perry fail to return Rush's consciousness to his body, Eli is forced to intervene, by locking away Ginn and Perry's consciousnesses in an inaccessible part of the computer. Rush awakens next to Volker and Greer, who are still recovering from the kidney transplant.
36	16	"The Hunt"	Andy Mikita	Joseph Mallozzi & Paul Mullie	April 12, 2011	1.020
An expeditionary team from Destiny encounters wildlife in a forested world, including a catlike predator who injures Scott and Park before vanishing with TJ and one other soldier. Young leads a futile search for the missing pair, while Greer struggles with an apparent loss of nerve. Varro and the other Lucian Alliance prisoners offer their expertise with tracking the creature, but the combined forces walk into a trap set by the creature, where James and Young are wounded and forced to return to the ship. After a futile counter-ambush, Greer and Varro are left as the only two continuing the search. TJ directs them to the creatures' lair, where it perceives the fire she'd built as a sign of intelligence and allows Greer to lead them back to the ship. Meanwhile, Rush, Eli and Brody find a section of the ship filled with stasis chambers. Eli and Brody ignore Rush's direction and investigate the chambers, and Rush activates a chamber from the bridge, freezing Brody and leaving Eli scrambling for solutions. Rush later de-activates the stasis chamber from the bridge, keeping his involvement to himself.
37	17	"**Common Descent**"	Peter DeLuise	Robert C. Cooper	April 26, 2011	0.861
Destiny escapes another drone attack, prompting suspicions the drone motherships are somehow tracking Destiny. The crew destroys the captured drone the next time the ship leaves FTL. Needing lime for the life support system, Scott and Greer explore a nearby planet and encounter two humans from a local settlement who recognize them as their ancestors. Eli hypothesizes that the crew of the ship from Twin Destinies were thrown back 2,000 years and founded a (now technologically advanced) society on a planet they call Novus. The settlers, actually colonists from Novus who have been out of gate contact for 30 years, help to resupply Destiny and ask for transport to Novus in exchange. Drones arrive and attack both the planet and ship simultaneously; the planet's Stargate is disabled and Destiny is forced to flee without Eli, Scott, Chloe, Greer and Wray. Rush suggests the drones are homing in on the energy of a wormhole created by an active stargate. Eli manages to use the Stargate's network connection to send Destiny a Morse code message that the drones had left. Upon returning, the crew takes on the colonists and travel to Novus, only to find it in a planet-wide volcanic winter and no sign of anyone.
38	18	"**Epilogue**"	Alex Chapple	Carl Binder	May 3, 2011	1.092
On Novus, the crew visits an abandoned bunker containing the entire Tenaran archive. From the archive, they learn that after the Novus stargate was destroyed by seismic activity the planet's two countries united and built sub-light ships to travel to one of its other colonies. The crew begins downloading the Tenaran database to Destiny and learns from Kino records of their other selves' lives. TJ learns that she developed ALS five years after their arrival and died shortly thereafter, while Volker was the first of the Destiny crew to die on the planet. Yaozu, the leader of the Novus settlers, believes the people of Novus developed a cure for ALS that's somewhere in the database, but earthquakes destroy the facility and city while Destiny has only uploaded one third of the database. The crew stays on the surface as long as possible, and Varro is seriously injured in a fall. Rush finds a new material in the bunker that will fix the CO2 scrubbers for years, but the ALS cure is not uploaded before earthquakes consume the archive bunker. Destiny sets course for the Novus colony to reunite the settlers with the other Novus colonists, who will arrive ahead of the sub-light ships ferrying the population off the doomed planet.
39	19	"Blockade"	Andy Mikita	Linda McGibney	May 10, 2011	0.993
When the Destiny tries to recharge in a star, they are met by drones. Trying another star, they discover the same. Low on power, Eli proposes a risky alternative: recharge the ship in a blue supergiant star instead which the drones would never expect. In order to accomplish the plan, the crew travels through the Stargate to a nearby planet, which turns out to be another Novus colony that is empty while Eli and Rush stay behind to manually pilot the ship while wearing the Ancient environmental suits which will protect them from the extreme heat. Dr. Park stays behind as well to save as many plants as possible from the Destiny garden, but gets trapped when the ship seals it off. The plan works and Destiny recharges, but the dome breaks and Park is flash-blinded before Eli manages to rescue her. On the planet, the crew discovers it has been destroyed by drones and encounters two which they destroy. They learn that thanks to a diversion, many of the people on the planet managed to escape through the Stargate before it was devastated. When a Control Ship shows up, the crew is forced to evacuate a little early, but by that point, Destiny is safe again. The trick won't work twice however and the drones will likely be waiting next time Destiny tries to recharge.
40	20	"Gauntlet"	Andy Mikita	Joseph Mallozzi & Paul Mullie	May 17, 2011	1.134
Eli discovers a way to track the command ships over long distances. The crew learns an ambush is waiting at every resupply point in the current galaxy. The crew modifies the ship's shields to specifically counteract the drone weapons and drops out of FTL right on top of a command ship. Destiny takes severe damage before destroying the command ship. Returning to FTL, the crew has supplies for one month. Eli proposes a plan to put the entire crew in the stasis pods for about 3 years, with the energy saved allowing the ship to stay in FTL until reaching the next galaxy. Vignettes are shown of several crew members making a final visit to earth via the Ancient communication stones. The crew learns some of the pods are damaged, prompting a daring plan to use a shuttle as a distraction while an away team gathers minerals from a dangerous planet. After successful repairs, all but Rush, Young and Eli are placed in stasis. A final pod is discovered to be non-functional. Rush volunteers to stay out and fix it, but Young speaks to Eli, who asserts his intelligence and willingness to try and fix the broken pod. If he fails, there will not be enough power to keep him alive and make it to the next galaxy. Young and Rush enter stasis, as the ship's systems power down. The episode closes with Eli standing on the observation deck, smiling in an enigmatic way, as Destiny makes its way through the galaxy in FTL.

== Ratings ==
The season premiere drew 1.175 million viewers in the US, lower than any episode in Season 1. Through its second season, SGU viewership continued to decline, falling below 1 million by the fourth episode and measuring only 0.814 million viewers for its thirteenth episode. Series co-creator Brad Wright attributed this decline to its change in timeslot (from Friday night to Tuesday night, and then again to Monday night), stating:

I don’t think if we, for any reason, go away, it is an issue necessarily of the quality of the product that we’ve been making. I think getting moved on the schedule has hurt us. And the fact that some of the fans that liked SG-1 and Atlantis were so angry that they have deliberately hurt us, which is unfortunate.

Syfy announced on December 16, 2010, that it would not be picking Stargate Universe up for a third season.

=== Reaction to Cancellation ===
After the cancellation of Stargate Universe, Stargate fans reacted angrily towards Syfy. On May 12, 2011, Syfy released a letter explaining its reasons for the series' cancellation. The letter discussed the fact that ratings during the first season had fallen significantly on the Friday timeslot, dropping over 25% of its viewership during the long hiatus between the first and second half of the season. This prompted Syfy to start the second season in the Tuesday slot making room on Friday for wrestling. Despite Stargate Universe being jerked to Tuesday, the show managed to keep 75% of its audience. Despite this, SyFy cancelled the show replacing it again with wrestling.

== Media releases ==
DVD/Blu-ray Name	Episodes	DVD release date			Blu-ray release date	
DVD/Blu-ray Name	Episodes	Region 1	Region 2	Region 4	Region A	Region B
Stargate Universe Season 2	20	May 31, 2011	July 4, 2011	November 2, 2011	—N/a	—N/a

== See also ==
- List of Stargate Universe episodes
