= Stargate Universe season 1 =

Stargate Universe
- Season 1
- DVD cover
- No. of episodes: 20

Release
- Original network: Syfy
- Original release: October 2, 2009 – June 11, 2010

Season chronology
- Next → Season 2

The first season of Stargate Universe consists of 20 episodes. Brad Wright and Robert C. Cooper wrote the three-part series opener named "Air", which was originally planned to be a two-parter. The first two parts of "Air" premiered on Syfy on October 2, 2009, with regularly weekly airing beginning on October 9, 2009. "Fire" was originally going to be the title for episode four, but the story and script was too big to be able to fit into one episode, so the producers changed it to become a two-parter called "Darkness" and "Light", therefore pushing all future episodes forward one slot. "Justice" was the mid-season finale. The back half of the first season aired on Friday April 2, 2010 on Space and Syfy.

British channel Sky1 acquired the exclusive UK rights to Stargate Universe and began airing the series from October 6, 2009. The series then aired on Space in Canada. In Australia Stargate Universe commenced airing on free-to-air-TV on Network TEN from 20:30 on Monday 14 December 2009, broadcasting the first two episodes: "Air (Part 1)" and "Air (Part 2)" as a movie-length premiere. However, Network TEN dropped the series after just three weeks. All available episodes were however fast-tracked from the US and broadcast on the Sci Fi Channel on Foxtel screening in Australia only 'days' after the US.

== Main cast ==
- Starring Robert Carlyle as Dr. Nicholas Rush
- Louis Ferreira as Colonel Everett Young
- Brian J. Smith as First Lieutenant Matthew Scott
- Elyse Levesque as Chloe Armstrong
- David Blue as Eli Wallace
- Alaina Huffman as First Lieutenant Tamara Johansen
- With Jamil Walker Smith as Master Sergeant Ronald Greer
- And Ming-Na as Camile Wray

== Episodes ==
Episodes in bold are continuous episodes, where the story spans over 2 or more episodes.

No. overall	No. in season	Title	Directed by	Written by	Original release date	US viewers (millions)
1	1	"**Air**"	Andy Mikita	Brad Wright & Robert C. Cooper	October 2, 2009	2.346
2	2	"**Air**"	Andy Mikita	Brad Wright & Robert C. Cooper	October 2, 2009	2.346
3	3	"**Air**"	Andy Mikita	Brad Wright & Robert C. Cooper	October 9, 2009	2.346
Part 1: During an official visit to the top secret base Icarus, an attack from space forces the team to evacuate. Rather than dialing Earth, Dr. Nicholas Rush dials a ninth chevron address, sending them to Destiny, an Ancient starship located billions of lightyears from Earth. Part 2: After arriving on the Destiny, the team discovers that the ship's life support system is failing, and they must find a way to fix it. Part 3: The Destiny dials the Stargate to a desert planet which has a mineral needed to repair the life support system. Meanwhile, Chloe Armstrong has a last chance to see her mother.
4	4	"**Darkness**"	Peter DeLuise	Brad Wright	October 16, 2009	2.099
Power fails on the Destiny, but the ship has maneuvered toward three probably-habitable planets to save the crew. Meanwhile, Eli Wallace records individual messages from the crew in case they do not survive.
5	5	"**Light**"	Peter DeLuise	Brad Wright	October 23, 2009	2.015
Following from the end of "Darkness", the Destiny is on a collision course with a star. A plan is devised to use the last working shuttle to evacuate to one of the three planets. However, there is only room for seventeen people and no time for additional trips, so a lottery is held to determine who will leave. Ultimately it's discovered Destiny was flying into the sun to replenish its power and afterwards the shuttle docks with Destiny which jumps back into FTL.
6	6	"Water"	William Waring	Story by : Brad Wright, Robert C. Cooper & Carl Binder; Teleplay by : Carl Binder	October 30, 2009	1.974
The ship drops out of FTL in range of an ice planet so the crew can replenish their water supply. While Scott and Young look for suitable ice, the rest of the crew learns that the living dust cloud from "Air (Part 3)" has stowed away on the ship and is rapidly absorbing their remaining water.
7	7	"Earth"	Ernest Dickerson	Story by : Brad Wright, Robert C. Cooper & Martin Gero; Teleplay by : Martin Gero	November 6, 2009	1.626
Young, Eli, and Chloe use the Ancient communication device to contact Earth. Telford takes over command of the Destiny during the switch, while Williams and Jack O'Neill inform the trio about a potentially dangerous plan that could bring them all back to Earth.
8	8	"Time"	Robert C. Cooper	Robert C. Cooper	November 13, 2009	1.802
During a mission to a jungle planet, the crew finds a Kino from the future that predicts their death from a virulent disease. However, even armed with the knowledge of their deaths, finding a way to stop the disease proves problematic.
9	9	"Life"	Alex Chapple	Carl Binder	November 20, 2009	1.891
The scientific crew finds an ancient chair interface similar to one in Antarctica used by O'Neill. Lt. Scott and Camille visit their loved ones using the Ancient communication stones.
10	10	"Justice"	William Waring	Alan McCullough	December 4, 2009	1.340
Sgt. Spencer is found dead, and Col. Young is implicated in his possible murder. Meanwhile, a crew member tries to use the chair interface and Rush is marooned on an alien planet, when Col. Young discovers that Rush is the one who framed him.
11	11	"**Space**"	Andy Mikita	Joseph Mallozzi & Paul Mullie	April 2, 2010	1.486
A malfunction with the Ancient communication stones leads Young to discover an alien presence near the Destiny. When they show up off the bow of the Destiny, everyone but Young is surprised. They immediately send boarding ships toward Destiny, and begin attacking. In the skirmish, Chloe is abducted. Young uses the stones again, gaining control of one of the aliens, finding Rush on board. Using alien tech, they briefly communicate, before Young is ripped back to his body. Rush is then left with the alien, suddenly back in its own body. He gets a flash of thoughts from the alien, learning the layout of the ship and the location of Chloe. He frees her, and they fly back to Destiny in one of the alien attack vessels. After arriving back at Destiny, Rush corroborates Young's story about the rock slide.
12	12	"**Divided**"	Félix Enríquez Alcalá	Joseph Mallozzi & Paul Mullie	April 9, 2010	1.600
Following the alien attack, Rush suspects there is a tracking device aboard Destiny. Meanwhile, dissatisfied with the military leadership, the civilian population stages a coup to take control of the ship.
13	13	"Faith"	William Waring	Denis McGrath	April 16, 2010	1.422
The Destiny arrives at a star system that should not exist. The crew discovers a planet there that could meet all of their needs.
14	14	"Human"	Robert C. Cooper	Jeff Vlaming	April 23, 2010	1.313
Rush risks his life in an experiment involving the ship's chair interface and flashes back to when he was recruited into the Stargate Program. Gloria Rush, his deceased wife, and Michael Shanks as Daniel Jackson appear in the flashbacks.
15	15	"Lost"	Rohn Schmidt	Martin Gero	April 30, 2010	1.587
The offworld team is trapped in some ruins on a planet, and the ordeal brings back memories of Greer's abusive father and inept mother. Meanwhile, the crew on the Destiny continues their attempt at gaining access to the ship's flight controls, so they can rescue Eli, Chloe, Scott and Greer.
16	16	"Sabotage"	Peter DeLuise	Barbara Marshall	May 7, 2010	1.391
One of the FTL drives of Destiny explodes, and the crew suspects the aliens that kidnapped Rush and Chloe have taken control of one of the crew members.
17	17	"Pain"	William Waring	Carl Binder	May 14, 2010	1.554
When the crew suffers from vivid hallucinations that tap into their personal fears, Tamara Johansen isolates the affected from the rest and then tries to seek out the cause of the affliction as it spreads and becomes life-threatening.
18	18	"**Subversion**"	Alex Chapple	Joseph Mallozzi & Paul Mullie	May 21, 2010	1.454
A blended memory from an Ancient communication stones side effect causes Rush to suspect Colonel Telford of collaborating with the Lucian Alliance. Colonel Young and General Jack O'Neill formulate a plan to expose the mole, which requires a little help from Daniel Jackson.
19	19	"**Incursion**"	Andy Mikita	Joseph Mallozzi & Paul Mullie	June 4, 2010	1.178
20	20	"**Incursion**"	Andy Mikita	Joseph Mallozzi & Paul Mullie	June 11, 2010	1.469
Part 1: The Lucian Alliance finds a way to board the Destiny and takes several crew members hostage. Samantha Carter tries to locate the captured Rush and the planet from which they are gating to Destiny. Later the ship has a power failure which causes failure of an attempt by Young to overpower the Lucian Alliance leader, Kiva, who shoots a hostage in retaliation. They later realize these power failures are caused by the radiation of a binary neutron star and Destiny is diverting all power to the shields to compensate. Part 2: Young decides to surrender control of the ship while sending Rush to hide and regain control from one of the other panels aided by Telford. When Kiva and Telford shoot each other, the new leader of the Lucian Alliance decides this must be a plot and separates the civilians from the military personnel to "put an end to this". All military personnel are about to be executed when the next burst hits the ship.

== Reception ==
The series premier was watched by 2.346 million viewers. By the end of the season the show had maintained 65% of its audience, with the finale drawing 1.469 million viewers, which was higher than the premier of Breaking Bad.

== Media releases ==
DVD/Blu-ray Name	Episodes	DVD release date			Blu-ray release date	
DVD/Blu-ray Name	Episodes	Region 1	Region 2	Region 4	Region A	Region B
Stargate: Universe – Extended Pilot	2	—N/a	—N/a	February 3, 2010	—N/a	—N/a
Stargate SG-U: 1.0	10	February 9, 2010	—N/a	—N/a	February 9, 2010	—N/a
Stargate SG-U: 1.5	10	July 27, 2010	—N/a	—N/a	July 27, 2010	—N/a
Stargate Universe Season 1	20	October 5, 2010	July 5, 2010	January 12, 2011	October 5, 2010	July 5, 2010

== See also ==
- List of Stargate Universe episodes
