= Sabotage (Stargate Universe) =

- Stargate Universe episode
- Colonel Young and Dr. Nicholas Rush watch over Jeremy Franklin as he interfaces with the chair
- Episode no.: Season 1 Episode 16
- Directed by: Peter DeLuise
- Written by: Barbara Marshall
- Production code: 116
- Original air date: May 7, 2010

Guest appearances
- Julia Benson as Vanessa James; Haig Sutherland as Sgt. Hunter Riley; Peter Kelamis as Adam Brody; Jennifer Spence as Lisa Park; Jeffrey Bowyer-Chapman as Darren Becker; Mark Burgess as Jeremy Franklin; Patrick Gilmore as Dr. Dale Volker; Kathleen Munroe as Dr. Amanda Perry; Michael Karl Richards as Major Peterson; Catherine Lough Haggquist as Mary; Vera Mendoza-Cuadra as Airman; Reiko Aylesworth as Sharon

Episode chronology
← Previous "Lost"	Next → "Pain"

"Sabotage" is the sixteenth episode of military science fiction television series Stargate Universe. The episode originally aired on May 7, 2010 on Syfy in the United States, and on SPACE in Canada. The episode was directed by, Peter DeLuise who previously directed the two episode arc, Darkness and Light. It was written by Barbara Marshall.

In this episode, the Destiny begins its journey to the next galaxy. However Dr. Nicholas Rush (Robert Carlyle) calculates that the ship will fall 50,000 light years short of its target. To resolve this problem, Rush brings in Dr. Amanda Perry (Kathleen Munroe) to help increase the efficiency of the FTL drives. However their efforts are hampered as a hostile force has managed to disable the Destiny's FTL drive and begin an attack in order to gain control of the ship.

== Plot ==
Colonel Young (Louis Ferreira) has gathered everyone in the gateroom to inform them of the situation. He issues an order for strict rationing of food and water as there are no more gates to replenish their supplies. Rush calls Young away to inform him that the ship will fall short of its destination by 50,000 light years. Brody (Peter Kelamis) suggests increasing the efficiency of the FTL drive so power will not be an issue. However, with limited knowledge of drive technology, Rush calls in Dr. Amanda Perry to help. At first Lt. James offers to exchange bodies with Perry. However, Perry uses a wheelchair and uses a respirator to breathe; James is unable to adapt and is forced to return. Wray (Ming-Na) subsequently volunteers her body so she can spend time at home.

Suddenly there is an explosion aboard the Destiny and it drops out of FTL. As Rush and Perry try to figure what has happened, there is an incoming wormhole. It's Eli (David Blue), Chloe (Elyse Levesque) and Scott who have returned. As T.J. (Alaina Huffman) checks on the health of the three, Eli explains he thought someone aboard Destiny managed to help them dial-in, as he had done nothing on his end. Young orders Eli back to work to help get the ship fixed.

Lt. James tends to Franklin (Mark Burgess) and believes despite his unresponsive affect, that he understands what is transpiring but lacks control over his body. However, James does have her doubts about this belief, citing lack of sleep caused by a nightmare about being trapped in a dark room. T.J. thinks it's just a phantom memory from Perry.

As Perry gathers calculations from Eli, she reveals to him she has feelings for Rush. After examining the situation, Perry concludes that the Destiny should now be able to make it across the void despite the overload to the FTL drive. The overload has happened in the least efficient module and bypassing it would fix the ship and increase overall efficiency. Eli decides to use a robot they found in "Faith" to aid in the repairs. Meanwhile, Young decides to send a team to the planet Eli, Chloe and Scott were occupying to gather supplies. However the hostile aliens from "Space" are there waiting, leaving no choice but to fix the Destiny.

Three weeks pass and the repairs are nearly complete. After a night of drinking from a still that Brody made, Perry invites Rush to her room. The pair attempt to get intimate but Rush stops himself, citing the events in "Human". They are interrupted by T.J. coming to collect them for a meeting with Young.

Young informs them that when James came back to her own body, she knocked the stones onto the floor, thus never wiping the stone clean. One of the aliens then used this opportunity to connect to James and sabotage Destiny before broadcasting its location. Young prepares his soldiers for the battle before he is to sit in the chair interface to try to get the FTL up and running. However, Franklin, who seems to have regained some of his faculties, tells James to take him to the chair. He takes the place of Young and orders them to leave the room. Franklin is able to engage the FTL but upon re-entering the chair room Young and James find that Franklin is missing.

== Controversy ==
The casting call for Amanda Perry, originally to be cast as Eleanor Perry, contained some poorly chosen words which sparked controversy.

[ELEANOR PERRY] (35-40) and quite attractive. A brilliant scientist who happens to be a quadriplegic. Affected since childhood, her disability has rendered her body physically useless. However, after being brought on board the Destiny as the only person who may be able to save the ship and her crew from certain annihilation, she is given temporary powers that enable her to walk again and to finally experience intimacy.sptv050769..Strong guest lead. NAMES PREFERRED. ACTRESS MUST BE PHYSICALLY THIN. (THINK CALISTA FLOCKHART).

BA Haller from his blog at Media Dis&Dat responded negatively to the casting call saying "I'm profoundly disturbed by what this casting call suggests about disabilities (that a person's body is 'useless' unless fully abled, for example, that a disability is something that should be fixed, that people with disabilities do not have sex lives, and that a person with a disability is less than fully realized as a human being.) The casting call is making the rounds on the blogosphere, and is being roundly criticized in some quarters but welcomed in others."

Sarah Warn from AfterEllen.com chose to take aim at the network, saying "wow. And this is from the network that, when they received a failing grade from GLAAD a few weeks ago, said "we need to work harder." If this is working harder, I'd hate to see what slacking off would look like."

Series creators, Brad Wright and Robert Cooper responded by saying the following:

Recently, a casting breakdown was released to agents for an upcoming character in our television show, Stargate Universe. The character, Doctor Eleanor Perry, is a brilliant scientist at the top of her field, who also happens to be a quadriplegic. As part of a science fiction conceit that is core to our series, Perry's consciousness is temporarily exchanged with one our series main characters, Camile Wray, who is a lesbian. In the course of the story, Perry has the experience of being able bodied for the first time since she was a child. At the same time, Wray, temporarily encumbered by Perry's physical disability, experiences the unconditional love of her life partner. The language of the breakdown was insensitive and inaccurate, and we sincerely apologize to those who may have been offended. The audition pages that have been under scrutiny were from an early draft and released out of context. It is our desire and intention to portray both characters with dignity and respect, while remaining mindful of the ethical issues we're raising.

== Reception ==
Sabotage was viewed by 1.391 million live viewers, resulting in a 0.9 Household rating, a 0.6 among adults 18-49.

Carl England of Den of Geek said it was a "great episode that brought the whole crew together pretty well." Among England's praises, was the ending, calling it "mind-boggling," and saying that the "showrunners and writers of SGU consistently deliver superb endings that mean a lot to the show." Particular praise was given to the scenes with Dr. Rush and Perry, citing that it "really bring home the effect of the episode Human, which centred on his life prior to the Stargate." However, England was rather negative of the now-standard 20 episode season for the Stargate franchise, and stated he wished there was a little more room to spread the plot a bit more.

Ramsey Isler of IGN rated "Sabotage" a "Decent" 7.2 out of 10. Isler was generally negative about the episode, citing some of the plot to be "ridiculously convenient to the point of contrivance." Among Isler's complaints was the sudden arrival of Eli, Chloe and Scott, saying that the "drama set up in the previous episode is squandered". Also, the revelation that James had caused the FTL drive to explode, was "kind of random." Isler also did not like the plot device of the communication stones being used for intimacy. Meredith Woerner from Io9 was also very negative with the episode. Woerner's biggest complaint was with Eli, Chloe and Scott, saying "was I alone in screaming "No, no no no no no no" at the TV when the gate linked up again?" Among her other complaints was the lack of character development for Wray and the quick explanation of the device that was found in the episode "Faith". Overall, Woerner said: "I was hesitant to invest in another story line that may or may not be solved by a simple reset. I still have high hopes for the series[,] because the last few episodes have continually elevated the material and characters."
