= Human (Stargate Universe) =

- Stargate Universe episode
- Dr. Rush and his wife Gloria
- Episode no.: Season 1 Episode 14
- Directed by: Robert C. Cooper
- Written by: Jeff Vlaming
- Production code: 114
- Original air date: April 23, 2010

Guest appearances
- Julia Benson as Vanessa James; Haig Sutherland as Sgt. Hunter Riley; Peter Kelamis as Adam Brody; Patrick Gilmore as Dale Volker; Michael Shanks as Daniel Jackson; Suleka Mathew as Constance; Louise Lombard as Gloria Rush; Chad Krowchuk as Student; Ron Halder as Priest; Jasmine Chan as Little Girl; Melina Lam as Little Girl's Mother

Episode chronology
← Previous "Faith"	Next → "Lost"

"Human" is the fourteenth episode of military science fiction television series Stargate Universe. The episode originally aired on April 23, 2010 on Syfy in the United States, and on SPACE in Canada. The episode was directed by series creator, Robert C. Cooper and was written by Jeff Vlaming. The episode focuses on Dr. Rush working on modifying the chair interface, so that he can use it in an attempt to gain access to the master code while replaying the memories during his wife's dying days. The episode was viewed by 1.3 million Americans and was generally well received.

== Plot ==
Dr. Nicholas Rush (Robert Carlyle) uses the Ancient repository chair, which was previously used by Jeremy Franklin, who almost died using it. Rush devises a program which allows the chair to download the information slowly, and works out how to crack the master code to finally gain control of Destiny. He replays the memories from when his wife, Gloria (Louise Lombard), was dying from cancer, and when Daniel Jackson (Michael Shanks) recruited him to the Stargate program. When Rush finds the master code, he will exit the program. In the meantime, Colonel Young (Louis Ferreira) learns of this and considers disconnecting him if Rush's life is threatened. As Rush is about to give up, he realises a recurring element popping up everywhere; the number 46. When he visits Gloria at her death bed, she reveals that the number is a reference to Human genetics; 46 is the normal number of chromosomes for humans. After disconnecting himself from the chair, Rush writes a program to crack the master code, which is a specific gene used by the Ancients.

In the meantime, Destiny drops out of FTL near a planet that contains a ruined city. Greer (Jamil Walker Smith), Scott (Brian J. Smith), Eli (David Blue) and Chloe (Elyse Levesque) explore the ruins. Searching for the civilisation that lived there, the Kino gets lost in a network of tunnels. While looking for it, Greer encounters a giant spider and shoots it, causing the tunnels to collapse. A team led by Vanessa James (Julia Benson) arrives to dig them out, but with little time remaining, she resorts to using C4. However, the resulting explosion makes matters worse. Scott orders her to leave. The episode ends with Destiny jumping back to FTL, stranding the four on the planet.

== Production ==
The original title to the episode was "Lucid"; this was changed to "Human" by episode director Robert C. Cooper.

== Reception ==
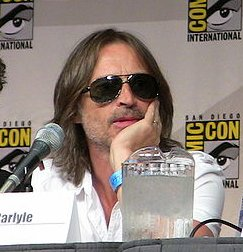
The episode's praise was mostly directed towards Robert Carlyle's performance, and his character's development.

The episode was initially viewed by 1.313 million live viewers in the United States, resulting in a 0.8 Household rating, a 0.4 among adults 18-49. Carl England of Den of Geek positively received the episode, due to being the first episode to centrally focus on Rush, citing "something I've wanted to happen since day one", and that much of Rush's history before the series wasn't disclosed. The episode was also praised for Carlyle's performance, and the endings of both story lines. However, England was critical with the scenes on the alien planet, stating "the scenes on the alien planet drag it down a little, as the lack of emotion held within do not play well against the heightened emotions of Dr Rush's storyline."

Ramsey Isler of IGN rated "Human" a "great" 8.7 out of 10, calling the episode "a very well written dramatic story". It was praised for Rush's character development, particularly that this was a good "origin story" for the character. Islar was also somewhat critical with the planet scenes, stating that he was "hoping there would be more suspense and maybe some horror-style scares", and found the cliffhanger disappointing. Meredith Woerner from Io9 stated that the episode showed promise and that the episode laced the original Stargate style and banter with raw SGU drama that the series was trying to create. Woerner praised "Human" for Michael Shanks's performance, which he felt brought charisma to the series, as well as Carlyle's performance, particularly the scenes between him and Louise Lombard. However, Woerner had mixed feelings towards Chloe's role in the episode's secondary storyline.

The episode was nominated for three Leo Awards. Robert C. Cooper was nominated for "Best Direction in a Dramatic Series". Also, Michael Blundell was nominated for "Best Cinematography in a Dramatic Series", while Rick Martin was nominated for "Best Picture Editing in a Dramatic Series".
