= Faith (Stargate Universe) =

- Stargate Universe episode
- The shuttle doing a flyover of the obelisk
- Episode no.: Season 1 Episode 13
- Directed by: William Waring
- Written by: Denis McGrath
- Production code: 113
- Original air date: April 16, 2010

Guest appearances
- Julia Benson as Vanessa James; Jennifer Spence as Lisa Park; Peter Kelamis as Adam Brody; Mark Burgess as Jeremy Franklin; Patrick Gilmore as Dale Volker; Tygh Runyan as Dr. Caine; Vincent Gale as Morrison; Darcy Laurie as Airman Dunning

Episode chronology
← Previous "Divided"	Next → "Human"

"Faith" is the thirteenth episode of military science fiction television series Stargate Universe. The episode originally aired on April 16, 2010 on Syfy in the United States, and on SPACE in Canada. The episode was directed by William Waring who directed two other episodes for the series. The episode was written by Denis McGrath, and this episode represents his first foray into the Stargate franchise.

In this episode, the Destiny finds herself drawn to the gravity well of a sun, leading the ship off-course. However, there is no trace of the sun in the database, and as the Destiny uses a parabolic manoeuvre to correct its course which will take roughly a month, the crew uses this time to explore a habitable planet and collect supplies.

== Plot ==
Destiny mysteriously exits FTL in a star system that the ship does not recognise; the seeding ships never informed Destiny of the system, and the habitable planet orbiting it. It is later revealed that the star is only 200 million years old, too young to start a system. Dr. Rush (Robert Carlyle) believes that the ship has dropped out of FTL in order to correct its course by performing a parabolic maneuver, which will take a month. In the meantime, a team uses the opportunity to explore the planet; the team finds fresh fruit, water and plants with medicinal attributes, which the expedition can take back with them. Also, during a flyover in the shuttle, Scott (Brian J. Smith) spots an artificial obelisk at least 2000 feet high.

While Destiny is out of shuttle range for the next few weeks, the team on the planet settles in. Rush uses the time to explore more of the ship, where he and his team make numerous new discoveries. Adam Brody (Peter Kelamis) and Lisa Park (Jennifer Spence) repair the second shuttle where Senator Armstrong sacrificed himself to save the crew. Eli (David Blue) and Wray (Ming-Na) discuss the possibility that the system might have been built by possibly the most advanced race in the Universe. Tension between the military and civilians since the coup passes. On the planet, T.J. (Alaina Huffman) is revealed to be pregnant with Colonel Young's (Louis Ferreira) baby.

During their last days on the planet, the team on the planet see the obelisk sending a beam of light into the night sky. By the time Destiny is back in range, Young learns that several of them wish to stay on the planet, including Robert Caine (Tygh Runyan) who believes that a higher power is responsible for creating the planet as a "lifeline" for the expedition, as well as believing that the race responsible will find them and return them to Earth. Young goes down to the planet with the partially repaired shuttle, and offers it to those who wish to stay, so long as all the military personnel return to Destiny, otherwise everyone will be returned by force. With the military personnel back on Destiny, a few civilians remain on the planet while Destiny jumps back to FTL. In the end, the expedition enjoy a feast from the food they brought from the planet.

== Reception ==
Carl England of Den of Geek found the episode more inclined to the dramatic side of the series, but noted, "it shouldn't ward off sci-fi fans, as it teases many alien-related plot points to come back to in later weeks." Overall, England said that "this episode may not have been as great as last week's, but it's a really good entry in the season one catalogue." IGN's Ramsey Isler was much more negative than Carl England, describing the episode as "a return to the slow stuff, and it really killed a lot of momentum." Among the complaints that Isler had was the re-bonding of the Destiny crew which he understood because of the recent mutiny but said, "it makes perfect sense, it just doesn't make for good drama." Isler also found the pregnancy of Lt. Johansen a little cliché citing he does not, "like that this is somewhat of a stereotypical role for a woman to be thrown into." Meredith Woerner from io9.com generally favoured the episode. Woerner had felt a little slighted by the ending of Divided but said this episode, "didn't attempt to end everything with a big shiny reset bow forcibly tied on in the end. And I loved it." She goes onto say it was, "a healthy dose of reality as soap dishy as it was." Woerner praised the character development of Lt. Johansen stating that, "we watched TJ, a normally calm and cool character, unravel for obvious reasons. Then we the audience got to weigh all the possible options with her. And even though we never really knowing the full story we assumed by her attitude you knew it couldn't have been pretty." However Woerner did have her complaints; citing Dr. Caine, "lunatic ramblings about the obelisk alien overlords."
