= Chupacabra vs. the Alamo =

2013 television film by Terry Igram

- Genre: Sci-fi horror
- Written by: Peter Sullivan
- Story by: Peter Sullivan; Jeffrey Schenck
- Directed by: Terry Igram
- Starring: Erik Estrada; Julia Benson
- Theme music composer: Stu Goldberg
- Country of origin: Canada
- Original language: English

Production
- Executive producers: Jeffrey Schenck; Kirk Shaw; Devi Singh
- Producer: Bryant Pike
- Cinematography: Anthony C. Metchie
- Editor: Nicole Ratcliffe
- Running time: 88 minutes
- Budget: $2 million

Original release
- Network: Syfy
- Release: March 23, 2013

Chupacabra vs. the Alamo is a 2013 made-for-TV movie about a pack of Chupacabra that use a tunnel to escape from Mexico to San Antonio, Texas. In their travels, however, they engage in many violent attacks. They begin to kill local residents and various drug cartel members.

The film stars Erik Estrada and Julia Benson as the protagonists. It was directed by Terry Ingram with the story by Peter Sullivan and Jeffrey Schenck. The movie was released in the U.S. and Canada initially and then later in Brazil and Germany under the titles Chupacabra and Chupacabra – Angriff der Killerbestien.

== Plot ==
A group of corpses are found in a tunnel, where they were attacked and killed by Chupacabras. The following day, Carlos Seguin (Erik Estrada) and Tracy Taylor (Julia Benson) begin to investigate the killings and discover a dying man who has also been attacked by the Chupacabras. The dying man identifies his killers as "Diablo" (Spanish for the Devil).

Tracy soon discovers a pile of bones deeper within the tunnel. A Chupacabra attacks Tracy, but she is able to kill it and the dead body is then taken back to a lab to study.

Later in the film, DEA Agent Perez (Aleks Paunovic), one of Seguin's partners, is searching the field with his dog. Both are eventually killed by a pack of Chupacabras. Before the man is killed, he takes a picture of one of the Chupacabras, which Carlos later finds while investigating the murders.

The Chupacabras attack a group of teenagers during a Cinco de Mayo party, forcing Sienna (Nicole Muñoz), Carlos' daughter and one of her friends to hide inside the school. They are able to call Carlos, who is able to shoot the Chupacabras. However, later while they are recovering in their home, another pack of Chupacabras attacks, this time injuring Sienna and killing her friend, Brooke.

After being relieved by his boss, Carlos enlists the aid of his son's gang. One of his friends, DEA Agent Wilcox (Zak Santiago) also comes up to help with a tactical team. Using the signal from a transponder that Taylor tagged unto one of the Chupacabras, the group trace the pack of monsters into a nearby warehouse. However, they end up being ambushed by the Chupacabras with most of the tactical team being killed.

In the climax, Carlos and the group of survivors lead the Chupacabras to the Alamo, where a battle takes place. In the end, they kill all the Chupacabras by blowing up the Alamo.

== Cast ==
- Erik Estrada as DEA Agent Carlos Seguin
- Julia Benson as Tracy Taylor
- Jorge Vargas as Tommy Seguin / "Spider" (Jorge Vargas Jr.)
- Vanesa Tomasino as DEA Agent Dani (Vanesa Tomasino Rodriguez)
- Nicole Muñoz as Sienna Seguin (Nicole Munoz)
- Chad Krowchuk as Crockett
- Brent McLaren as "Loco"
- Cassandra Fernandez as "Shorty"
- Bishop Brigante as "Gordo"
- Anja Savcic as Brooke
- Aleks Paunovic as DEA Agent Perez
- Zak Santiago as Commander Wilcox
- Jorge Montesi as DEA Director Collins
- Jose Os as Javier
- Dave Dimapilis as Juan
- Nick Mandryk as Colin
- Madison Smith as Darius
- Jessica Harmon as Jenny
- Matthew Harrison as Dr. Michael Fielding
- Frances Flanagan as Agatha
- David Nykl as Medical Examiner
- Samuel Patrick Chu as Sam

== Production ==
The movie was shot on location in San Antonio, Texas. It was distributed by Echo Bridge Home Entertainment in the USA and by Signature Entertainment in the UK on DVD. Digital Post Services was used for ADR Recording in post production.

== Promotion ==
The tagline for the film was "Chupacabras attack with a vengeance and this time they're taking on the Alamo".

== Reception ==
The movie has no rating on the Rotten Tomatoes site and there are no readily available rating numbers (Nielsen or otherwise) for its airing.
