= Matthew Scott (Stargate) =

Fictional character

- Brian J. Smith as Matthew Scott
- First appearance: "Air"
- Created by: Robert C. Cooper & Brad Wright
- Portrayed by: Brian J. Smith

In-universe information
- Species: Human (Tau'ri)
- Gender: Male
- Occupation: United States Air Force; First Lieutenant
- Children: Matthew Balic (son, with Annie)

First Lieutenant Matthew Scott, USAF is a fictional character from the 2010 science fiction television series, Stargate Universe, the third live-action series in the Stargate franchise, which centers on a group of soldiers and civilians trapped on the Ancient vessel Destiny. He is portrayed by Brian J. Smith. Matthew Scott holds the rank of First Lieutenant, and is described as a skilled and well-trained junior SGC member in his twenties, but is "mentally unprepared for the urgency of the situation" aboard the Destiny.

Originally named Jared Nash, Scott was among the first characters to have been created in the series. Before being cast, Smith had not seen the Stargate series, but caught up with much of SG-1 afterward. The character has been well received by critics as well as some of the cast and crew of the series.

== Character arc ==
In season one, Scott is said to be 26 years old. At age 4, his parents were killed in a car crash and he was raised by a priest whose alcoholism led to his death when Scott was 16. He originally planned to enter the priesthood until he slept with a girl, Annie Balic, and she fell pregnant. Though Annie told Scott she was not going to go through with the pregnancy she changed her mind and had a boy who she named Matt, after his father.

In the present day, Scott is in a physical relationship with fellow Icarus Base officer Vanessa James (Julia Benson). After the base falls under attack, Colonel Everett Young (Louis Ferreira) has him lead the expedition to the nine-chevron address after Nicholas Rush (Robert Carlyle) dials it instead of Earth. Scott becomes the leader of the expedition's first off-world mission, where he finds lime to repair the CO_{2} scrubbers on the Destiny, having followed a strange, swirling cloud of dust to its location. While on the ship he develops a friendship, and later intimate relationship with Chloe Armstrong (Elyse Levesque). In the second half of the first season, Scott participates in an off-world mission with Chloe, Eli (David Blue) and Greer; during the mission, he and the team end up trapped underground, and Destiny leaves without them. After Destiny leaves the galaxy without them, the planet's Stargate mysteriously activates to Destiny and they step through, not knowing until later that it was the work of the blue aliens introduced in "Space".

=== Characterization ===
"Matt really gets thrown around a lot and has no problem sacrificing himself. He wants desperately for everyone to get back to their families and he'd rather die than fail."

— Brian J. Smith describing Scott's role

Actor Brian J. Smith believed Scott started out like something of "the background character in SG-1" and that in Universe he's "all of a sudden [...] this main character in this tragedy." He describes Scott as "an emotional leader" and a "deceptively simple guy," with a very intense and sad back story full of loss and challenges. Scott would also be "at his best" in the episode "Water", and be "at his worst" in the episode "Pain". He is shown to be fairly religious, which is proven by reciting the words to Psalm 23 in "Darkness". Smith commented that Scott views Colonel Young as a father figure, but throughout the first season he is "starting to see him becoming something ugly and demented," though "he can forgive" and "he can learn." Concerning Scott's relationship with Chloe, Smith believed that although "so much happened so fast," behind the scenes, they share common hopes, dreams and fears, and tease and joke with each other. He also believed Scott would view Eli as "bizarre and weird, and doesn't quite know what to make of him," but respects his brain power and friendliness, and doesn't think there is a sense of threat or competition between Scott and Eli concerning Chloe, since they both "understand the place that each of them have in Chloe's life."

== Conceptual history ==
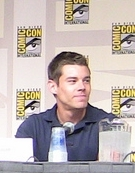
Brian J. Smith, who originally didn't want to portray a regular in a television series, was attracted to Scott's backstory and the writing of the pilot.

In the original casting call of the series, Matthew Scott was originally named Jared Nash. He was among the first of the main characters to have been created by Brad Wright and Robert C. Cooper. Scott was created as a flawed hero, since the viewers could identify with this better than a "perfect hero"; in SG-1 and Atlantis, all the characters often knew the solution to various problems, but the creators didn't want this to be the case in Universe. Wright and Cooper also made the character religious because they avoided doing so in characters in the past.

Before being cast, Brian J. Smith had been working as a stage actor in New York City for a year and a half and had seen a couple of Stargate episodes. When he was looking to start a television career, he saw himself to play for guest spots or multi-episode characters rather than series regulars. When he was approached for the role, he was attracted to the writing of the pilot episode and a talk with Robert C. Cooper, who outlined the new approach to shooting the series. He was also attracted to his character's backstory, and was impressed to see "a young man in his twenties portrayed this way," and that the writers did not create Scott in other series where actors Smith's age are portrayed as egotistical, mindless, and sex-craved players.

Smith taped his Stargate Universe audition and was invited to a screen test in Los Angeles. He received the news of being cast a few days after the screen test. He prepared for the role by doing military research, particularly by reading books based on the Vietnam War, and talking with Angelique McDonald, one of the series' Air Force advisers, about the nature of and how vulnerable First Lieutenants really are. He had not seen the Stargate TV series before being cast, but caught up with much of SG-1 afterwards. Smith has said that one of his favourite episodes in the first season was "Air", partly due to the filming in White Sands, New Mexico, but also said it was one of the most difficult to film, and "Life". When acting for the role, Smith wanted to make everything real. In an interview with SFX, Smith expressed being anxious and nervous over performing nude scenes in the series, stating "When you're doing a scene and you're very scantily clad, you can get a little bit nervous and don't know how it's going to turn out."

== Reception ==
According to Consulting Producer Joseph Mallozzi, Brian J. Smith was "always a pleasure to talk to", "extremely talented" and reminded him and the character as "a young Ben Browder." Smith himself positively received his character, saying "I just like the kid, I like him a lot." Fellow actor Jamil Walker Smith named Scott his favorite character. Mark Wilson of About.com called Brian J. Smith as Matthew Scott a "breakout performance", and that although Smith was relatively fresh out of Juilliard School, he is able to "bring to bear his own situation as a novice shouldering a significant portion of the weight of a show like this."
