= List of Stargate Universe episodes =

Stargate Universe is a Canadian-American military science fiction television series created by Brad Wright and Robert C. Cooper as a spin off from its sister shows, Stargate SG-1 and Stargate Atlantis.

The show has stand-alone episodes as well as multi-part episodes, and it also has more season-long story and character arcs running through every episode than any other Stargate series. Brad Wright was hopeful that the show would last three or more seasons. On December 16, 2010, Entertainment Weekly reported that the show would end after the second season.

== Series overview ==
Season	Episodes	Originally released	
Season	Episodes	First released	Last released
1	20	October 2, 2009	June 11, 2010
2	20	September 28, 2010	May 9, 2011

Episodes in bold are continuous episodes, where the story spans over 2 or more episodes.

== Television series ==
=== Season 1 (2009–10) ===
The first season consists of 20 episodes. Brad Wright and Robert C. Cooper wrote the three-parter series opener named "Air", which was originally planned to be a two-parter. The first two parts of "Air" premiered on Syfy on October 2, 2009, with regularly weekly airing beginning on October 9, 2009. "Fire" was originally going to be the title for episode four, but the story and script was too big to be able to fit into one episode, so the producers changed it to become a two-parter called "Darkness" and "Light", therefore pushing all future episodes forward one slot. "Justice" was the mid-season finale. The back half of the first season aired on Friday April 2, 2010 on Space and Syfy.

British channel Sky1 acquired the exclusive UK rights to Stargate Universe and began airing the series from October 6, 2009. The series currently airs on Space in Canada. In Australia Stargate Universe commenced airing on free-to-air-TV on Network Ten from 20:30 on Monday 14 December 2009, broadcasting the first two episodes: "Air (Part 1)" and "Air (Part 2)" as a movie-length premiere. However, Network Ten dropped the series after just three weeks. All available episodes were however fast-tracked from the US and broadcast on the Sci Fi Channel on Foxtel screening in Australia only 'days' after the US.

Episodes in bold are continuous episodes, where the story spans over 2 or more episodes.

No. overall	No. in season	Title	Directed by	Written by	Original release date	US viewers (millions)
1	1	"**Air**"	Andy Mikita	Brad Wright & Robert C. Cooper	October 2, 2009	2.346
2	2	"**Air**"	Andy Mikita	Brad Wright & Robert C. Cooper	October 2, 2009	2.346
3	3	"**Air**"	Andy Mikita	Brad Wright & Robert C. Cooper	October 9, 2009	2.346
4	4	"**Darkness**"	Peter DeLuise	Brad Wright	October 16, 2009	2.099
5	5	"**Light**"	Peter DeLuise	Brad Wright	October 23, 2009	2.015
6	6	"Water"	William Waring	Story by : Brad Wright, Robert C. Cooper & Carl Binder; Teleplay by : Carl Binder	October 30, 2009	1.974
7	7	"Earth"	Ernest Dickerson	Story by : Brad Wright, Robert C. Cooper & Martin Gero; Teleplay by : Martin Gero	November 6, 2009	1.626
8	8	"Time"	Robert C. Cooper	Robert C. Cooper	November 13, 2009	1.802
9	9	"Life"	Alex Chapple	Carl Binder	November 20, 2009	1.891
10	10	"Justice"	William Waring	Alan McCullough	December 4, 2009	1.340
11	11	"**Space**"	Andy Mikita	Joseph Mallozzi & Paul Mullie	April 2, 2010	1.486
12	12	"**Divided**"	Félix Enríquez Alcalá	Joseph Mallozzi & Paul Mullie	April 9, 2010	1.600
13	13	"Faith"	William Waring	Denis McGrath	April 16, 2010	1.422
14	14	"Human"	Robert C. Cooper	Jeff Vlaming	April 23, 2010	1.313
15	15	"Lost"	Rohn Schmidt	Martin Gero	April 30, 2010	1.587
16	16	"Sabotage"	Peter DeLuise	Barbara Marshall	May 7, 2010	1.391
17	17	"Pain"	William Waring	Carl Binder	May 14, 2010	1.554
18	18	"**Subversion**"	Alex Chapple	Joseph Mallozzi & Paul Mullie	May 21, 2010	1.454
19	19	"**Incursion**"	Andy Mikita	Joseph Mallozzi & Paul Mullie	June 4, 2010	1.178
20	20	"**Incursion**"	Andy Mikita	Joseph Mallozzi & Paul Mullie	June 11, 2010	1.469

The final episode of Season 1, "Incursion (Part 2)", had World Premiere on the German TV channel "RTL2". RTL2 aired the episode one week ahead of Syfy, in combination with "Incursion (Part1)".

=== Season 2 (2010–11) ===
The second season of Stargate Universe was announced by Syfy on December 13, 2009. Like the first season, the second season consisted of 20 episodes. Nine episodes had already been reserved by the primary series writers. The series was moved from the franchise's usual time on Friday to Tuesday, along with Caprica. This was due to Syfy picking up WWE Friday Night SmackDown. The series resumed on September 28, 2010, USA. In Ireland & UK the series resumed on October 5 at 9pm on Sky1 and Sky1 HD. Syfy announced the series cancellation during the mid-season hiatus. Syfy aired the remainder of season two consisting of the final 10 episodes which were all filmed before the series was cancelled. The second half of Season 2 began airing on Mondays as of March 7. In Canada, the second half of Season 2 began airing on Tuesdays as of March 8 at 10pm on the Space Channel.

Episodes in bold are continuous episodes, where the story spans over 2 or more episodes.

No. overall	No. in season	Title	Directed by	Written by	Original release date	US viewers (millions)
21	1	"**Intervention**"	Andy Mikita	Joseph Mallozzi & Paul Mullie	September 28, 2010	1.175
22	2	"Aftermath"	William Waring	Robert C. Cooper	October 5, 2010	1.070
23	3	"Awakening"	Andy Mikita	Joseph Mallozzi & Paul Mullie	October 12, 2010	1.222
24	4	"Pathogen"	Robert Carlyle	Carl Binder	October 19, 2010	0.974
25	5	"Cloverdale"	Alex Chapple	Brad Wright	October 26, 2010	1.012
26	6	"Trial and Error"	Andy Mikita	Joseph Mallozzi & Paul Mullie	November 2, 2010	0.967
27	7	"**The Greater Good**"	William Waring	Carl Binder	November 9, 2010	1.074
28	8	"**Malice**"	Robert C. Cooper	Robert C. Cooper	November 16, 2010	1.025
29	9	"Visitation"	William Waring	Remi Aubuchon	November 23, 2010	1.169
30	10	"**Resurgence**"	William Waring	Joseph Mallozzi & Paul Mullie	November 30, 2010	1.094
31	11	"**Deliverance**"	Peter DeLuise	Joseph Mallozzi & Paul Mullie	March 8, 2011	1.035
32	12	"Twin Destinies"	Peter DeLuise	Brad Wright	March 15, 2011	0.928
33	13	"Alliances"	Peter DeLuise	Linda McGibney	March 22, 2011	0.814
34	14	"Hope"	William Waring	Carl Binder	March 29, 2011	0.876
35	15	"Seizure"	Helen Shaver	Remi Aubuchon	April 5, 2011	0.823
36	16	"The Hunt"	Andy Mikita	Joseph Mallozzi & Paul Mullie	April 12, 2011	1.020
37	17	"**Common Descent**"	Peter DeLuise	Robert C. Cooper	April 26, 2011	0.861
38	18	"**Epilogue**"	Alex Chapple	Carl Binder	May 3, 2011	1.092
39	19	"Blockade"	Andy Mikita	Linda McGibney	May 10, 2011	0.993
40	20	"Gauntlet"	Andy Mikita	Joseph Mallozzi & Paul Mullie	May 17, 2011	1.134

== Webisodes ==
Stargate Universe Kino

Thirty-four webisodes have also been released to tie into the series. The webisodes use "SG·U Stargate Universe KINO" as their title card. They center on the Kino (described by Mallozzi as an Ancient version of the MALP) following around the crew of the Destiny. The webisodes are available for viewing at the Kino character profile.

No.	Title	Original release date
Kino–1	"Get Outta Here"	October 22, 2009
Eli spies on Col. Young with the Kino.
Kino–2	"Not The Com Lab"	October 22, 2009
Eli gets lost trying to find the com lab.
Kino–3	"No Idea"	October 22, 2009
Eli is exploring the ship and has no idea what room he is in.
Kino–4	"The Stargate Room"	October 22, 2009
Eli shows the Gate Room.
Kino–5	"Eli's Room"	October 22, 2009
Eli shows his room.
Kino–6	"Don't Encourage Him"	October 23, 2009
Eli talks through the Kino to Scott, Johansen, and Greer. Greer warns Eli not to use the Kino to spy on women, in response to the failed attempt to spy on Lt. James in "Darkness".
Kino–7	"Corridor Conversation"	October 23, 2009
Eli spies on Chloe and Lt. Scott.
Kino–8	"Marked Hatch"	October 26, 2009
Eli talks about one of the hatches that is sealing a damaged compartment.
Kino–9	"Not Supposed To Be In Here"	October 26, 2009
Eli shows one of the shuttles.
Kino–10	"Nobody Cares"	October 26, 2009
Eli interviews Chloe.
Kino–11	"Kino Race"	November 2, 2009
Riley and Eli have a race with Kinos.
Kino–12	"Covered Kino"	November 2, 2009
Lt. James covers a Kino that's watching the shower room.
Kino–13	"Variety"	November 2, 2009
Becker, the chef, watches as Inman isolates banana-flavored esters from chemical impurities in water from the ice planet for him to use. At the end, the ship shakes suddenly and everyone leaves to find out what happened.
Kino–14	"You Okay?"	November 9, 2009
Lt. Scott tries to comfort Chloe after the recently-failed attempt to dial home in "Earth".
Kino–15	"Do I Look Stupid?"	November 9, 2009
Lt. Scott and Dr. Volker help Dr. Brody and Sgt. Riley put on the space suits so they can start repairing damaged power conduits. Brody is self-conscious about how the suit looks and can't get his balance. Riley realizes that he has to go to the bathroom, but is reluctant to go in the suit despite it being made for that. Volker takes the opportunity to tease him about it.
Kino–16	"All Telford's Fault"	November 9, 2009
Dr. Park tries to comfort Dr. Brody after Sgt. Riley's accident in "Earth". Brody blames Telford for putting Riley in danger, and decides to help Rush instead. This leads into Rush's scheme to get rid of Telford at the end of the episode.
Kino–17	"What's That Light?"	November 14, 2009
Dr. Brody and Dr. Park have rigged an interface between the radios and Destiny's intercom, but are having trouble distinguishing between the public and private channels, leading to some unfortunate on-air comments.
Kino–18	"New Kind of Crazy"	November 19, 2009
Following from the end of "Time", Eli and Lt. Scott detail how they found the two Kinos which were sent back in time in the two alternate timelines. With that knowledge, T.J. is developing a cure for the disease which they are all infected with. Both Eli and Scott relay their thanks to the alternate Scott who sacrificed his life, and Eli wishes that for once they could have a day where death isn't staring them in the face.
Kino–19	"Only Run When Chased"	November 19, 2009
Eli, Dr. Park, Dr. Volker, and Dr. Brody are watching South Park when Lt. Scott comes in to assign them their daily exercise regimen: a two-mile run in under 21 minutes. Eli claims this to be impossible, and bets Scott a protein bar that he can't do it. When Scott runs off to prove them wrong, they all go back to watching South Park.
Kino–20	"Want Me To Bust Him Up?"	November 25, 2009
Greer finds Dr. Park crying and attempts to comfort her.
Kino–21	"The Apple Core"	December 9, 2009
Eli shows the control interface room, which he has nicknamed the "Apple Core". Brody objects to the name, but his fellow scientists simply go along with Eli's nickname to annoy him.
Kino–22	"Not Just For Posterity"	December 9, 2009
Dr. Park records a video diary for her family and friends, but records more than she intended when she forgets how to use the pause button.
Kino–23	"We Volunteer To Do This"	April 16, 2010
Eli interviews Airman Kelly, while her consciousness is in Chloe's body, about why she volunteered to use the Ancient communication stones.
Kino–24	"Wait For It"	April 23, 2010
Dr. Brody attempts to take revenge on Sgt. Riley by playing a prank on him.
Kino–25	"Drop The Sirs"	May 14, 2010
Scott tells Greer to be sometimes less formal. After that they chat a bit.
Kino–26	"Like a Hug"	May 19, 2010
TJ and Dr. Park discuss Rush's relationship with Dr. Perry.
Kino–27	"Chloe's Room"	August 9, 2010
Eli stops by Chloe's room while he's touring the ship, but she doesn't answer the door.
Kino–28	"Disgusting Habit"	August 9, 2010
Sgt. Spencer and Dr. Brody sneak a smoke and catch the Kino watching them.
Kino–29	"Favorite Meal Of All Time"	August 9, 2010
Sgt. Greer refuses, but Dr. Park, Dr. Brody, Lt. James, Dr. Franklin and Lt. Scott share their favorite meals.
Kino–30	"Not Being There"	August 9, 2010
Riley gives an update on his family back home on Earth.
Kino–31	"One Long Endless Night"	January 27, 2011
Lt. James talks about keeping time on the Destiny. Camile wishes James a happy birthday.
Kino–32	"Horrible Accident"	January 28, 2011
Sgt. Riley uses the Kino to check up on Eli in the infirmary.
Kino–33	"Painful Moments"	January 31, 2011
Brody, Park, Morrison, Sgt. Riley and Eli recount their most emotionally painful moments in life.
Kino–34	"All The Stages"	February 1, 2011
Lt. James documents all the stages she's gone through while aboard the Destiny.

== DVD and Blu-ray releases ==
Season	Product	Episodes	DVD release date			Blu-ray release date	
Season	Product	Episodes	Region 1	Region 2	Region 4	Region A	Region B
**1**	Stargate Universe - SG-U: 1.0	10	February 9, 2010	—N/a	—N/a	February 9, 2010	—N/a
**1**	Stargate Universe - SG-U: 1.5	10	July 27, 2010	—N/a	—N/a	July 27, 2010	—N/a
**1**	Stargate Universe - Complete Season 1	20	October 5, 2010	July 5, 2010	January 12, 2011	October 5, 2010	July 5, 2010
**2**	Stargate Universe - The Complete Final Season	20	May 31, 2011	July 4, 2011	November 2, 2011	—N/a	—N/a
1–2	Stargate Universe - The Complete Seasons 1-2	40	—N/a	August 29, 2011	November 2, 2011	January 15, 2021	January 15, 2021

== See also ==
- List of Stargate SG-1 episodes
- List of Stargate Atlantis episodes
