= List of Stargate Universe characters =

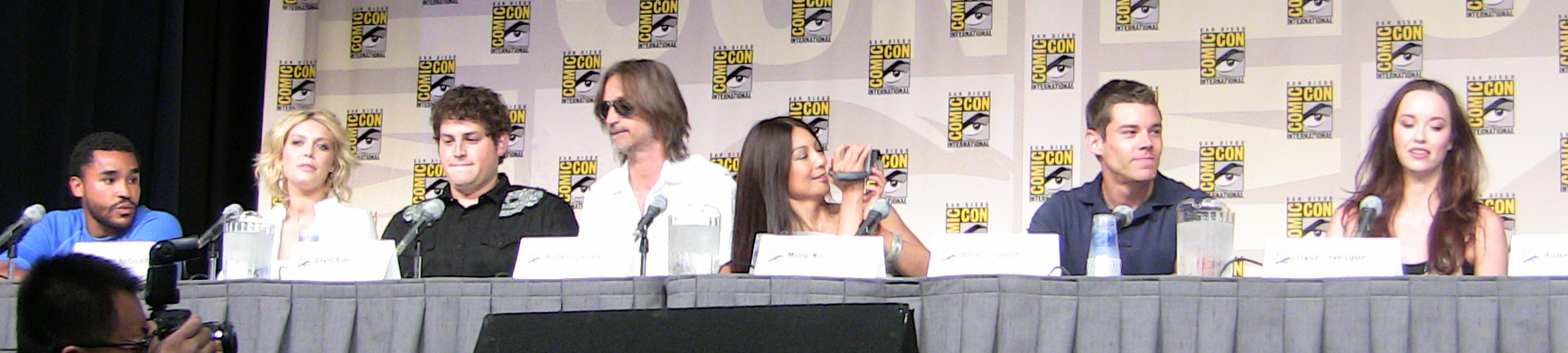
The SGU cast at Comic Con 2009

Stargate Universe (SGU) is an American-Canadian military science fiction television drama series which made its premiere on October 2, 2009, on the Syfy channel.

== Main characters ==
=== Nicholas Rush ===
Nicholas Rush (portrayed by Robert Carlyle) is an expert in Ancient technology. His research was hindered while he was married to Gloria Rush (Louise Lombard). Since her death, he has become more dedicated to science. He spearheads the Icarus Project, his main priority being to explore the mystery behind the ninth chevron of the Stargate. Rush was stationed at the Icarus Base in 2009, in order to do research on the ninth chevron. During an attack on the base, Rush and Eli Wallace figure out how to dial the ninth chevron, and are responsible for sending the remaining Icarus personnel to an Ancient ship known as the Destiny, a spaceship situated in a far-away galaxy, with no way of returning to Earth. Rush is greatly obsessed with completing Destiny's mission and won't let anyone stop him.

=== Everett Young ===
Louis Ferreira as Everett Young

Everett Young (portrayed by Louis Ferreira) is a USAF Colonel. Young is 40 years old and has been married to Emily Young since 2005. His crew was forced through the Stargate, ultimately becoming stranded on the Destiny. As the most senior military personnel, he becomes Captain aboard the Destiny. It is revealed in later episodes that while in command of Icarus Base, he had a brief affair with a subordinate junior officer Lt. Johansen, resulting in her pregnancy. It is this affair coupled with his refusal to put his wife before his military career that ultimately leads to the end of his marriage. As commented by Dr. Rush, Colonel Young has been through hell in his time on-board Destiny which almost caused him to go insane.

==== Character arc ====
Young is 40 years old and has been married to Emily Young since 2005. His crew was forced through the Stargate, ultimately becoming stranded on the Destiny. Young is seriously injured during their first arrival and it falls to Lieutenant Matthew Scott to lead the Icarus personnel until he is able to recover. He then becomes team leader aboard the Destiny.

However, Young has a difficult time, as he must try and lead a ship with divided loyalties. While the military personnel do not question his authority, the civilians and scientists have a harder time accepting his leadership. Even some of his superiors back on Earth are not confident in his ability to lead the crew although General Jack O'Neill says that Young was his first choice to head up the Expedition but Young turned him down. However, despite numerous power struggles and attempts to usurp him, Young has managed to stay in command. Due to the ship's divided loyalties, Scott, Greer, Johansen, and Eli are the only crew members he absolutely trusts. He even has Eli secretly use the Kinos to spy on the rest of the crew. Young has rocky relations with the civilian crew, and is personal enemies with Rush. After discovering a plot by Rush to frame him for murder, Young assaults Rush and leaves him to die on an uninhabited world in a fit of rage. When he finds out Rush is still alive on an alien ship, Young attempts to have the ship destroyed, but fails to prevent Rush from returning to the ship. However, as he freed Rush from his imprisonment aboard the ship himself and because Chloe Armstrong was still on board, it is possible he merely did this to protect Destiny. Both men then make an uneasy truce not to disclose the true events of their confrontation. Rush's distrust of Young's potential actions when he finds out he has a tracking device in his chest leads Rush to instigate a mutiny with Camile Wray, but it fails. Afterwards Young makes an effort to get along with Rush.

Meanwhile, Young leaves behind a strained personal life back on Earth. His wife, Emily, is divorcing him due to his continual habit of putting his military career before their marriage and an affair he had with his subordinate Lt. Johansen. To make matters worse, Colonel Telford tries to begin a relationship with Emily, and attempts to manipulate Emily into thinking that Young is still sleeping with Lt. Johansen. It is later revealed that Telford was brainwashed into helping the Lucian Alliance in their attempts to board Destiny—whether or not Telford's dislike of Young is a result of this brainwashing remains unclear. Young breaks the brainwashing on Telford by venting the atmosphere in the room he's in, killing him, then revives him. After being revived and free of brainwashing, Telford expresses to Young how truly horrified he was by his actions and is grateful for what Young did to free him. Also, Young has a friendlier and more comradely attitude towards Telford.

Young's affair with Lt. T.J. Johansen is not revealed until weeks after they're stranded on the Destiny, although it becomes clear via flashbacks that T.J. had resigned and planned on leaving the mission for unknown reasons. T.J.'s worried about Young's condition after he's severely injured upon arrival, which leads to Camile Wray becoming suspicious of the true nature of their friendship. Young's estranged wife later reveals he cheated on her, and via a dream Young has, it became clear his affair was with T.J. Although they are no longer sleeping together, they still care about each other and, according to Lt. Scott, exchange longing looks throughout their stay on the Destiny. After 22 weeks, T.J. tells Young she's pregnant with their child, and Young promises to take care of her and raise their child together. When the ship is taken over by the Lucian Alliance in the season 1 finale, T.J., along with others, is taken hostage. Young goes to extreme lengths to get T.J. back and it's shown he's even willing to trade his men for her. However, when a plan backfires, Young and his men are taken hostage as well and while they are about to be killed for their betrayal, T.J. is shot in the abdomen. Rush, Eli, Chloe and Brody manage to retake the ship, but T.J. loses the baby although she survives herself.

After the loss of his daughter, Sgt. Riley, whom Young euthanizes at Riley's own request, and his marriage, Young drifts into depression, drinks heavily and loses focus on his duties as commanding officer of the Destiny. He has trouble controlling his actions, repeatedly using excessive force against opponents and those who question him. In addition to his assault and abandonment of Rush, he also lies to use the communication stones to go back to earth and assault Telford, and assaults Rush on several other occasions. When Destiny itself tests his fitness to command, Young almost gives up completely until Lieutenant Scott, who is asked to take command by Rush and Wray, convinces him to pull himself out of his despair and take command once more. This, and Destiny's apparent "bond" to him as leader cause him to regain his self-respect and his leadership abilities. When he discovers that Rush long ago took control of the Destiny by breaking the ship's codes, Young is furious and nearly kills him as a result. Rush explains his motives for doing so to Young, including Destiny's true mission, and asks Young for his support in completing it. Young accedes to the point that when the crew has a chance to return home and Rush intends to stay behind with volunteers to complete the mission, Young chooses to stay as well to lead those who stay; in an alternate timeline, Young makes a speech that helps convince people to stay.

==== Conceptual history ====
"I was like ‘Sci-Fi: I don't know enough about it,' and I operate in a very strange way in that I sometimes ask the universe for signs. Like, ‘am I supposed to do this?' It's a strange thing that I ask."
—Louis Ferreira talking about why he chose the role.

After doing an audition for the role of Young for Stargate Universe, Louis Ferreira was not sure if it was a role he wanted to take on. He wanted a sign, which eventually happened when someone dumped their boat on Ferreira's front yard. Ferreira had always wanted to own a boat in the Vancouver area. He became more interested in the role when he found out that Robert Carlyle already had a part in the series, due to Ferreira being a big "fan" of Carlyle's acting. Ferreira was also supportive of the idea to move the Stargate franchise in a new direction.

Described in the initial character breakdown as a "handsome, capable, former SG team leader" in his 40s who holds the rank of Colonel. He is "like the Jack O'Neill of ten years ago" yet has sharper edges. Young is Rush's nemesis on the ship.

=== Matthew Scott ===
Matthew Scott (portrayed by Brian J. Smith) is a USAF First Lieutenant. After Icarus Base falls under attack, Colonel Everett Young has Lt. Scott lead the expedition to the nine-chevron address after Nicholas Rush dials it instead of Earth. After arriving on-board Destiny, Young, who was injured during the evacuation, temporarily puts Scott in command. When Young recovers, Scott remains as military second-in-command and leads the away teams. Lt. Scott develops a relationship with Chloe Armstrong and used to have one with Lt. Vanessa James before coming on-board Destiny. He is great friends with Sergeant Ronald Greer and Eli Wallace. Prior to joining the Air Force, Scott fathered a child which he had no knowledge of until years later.

=== Chloe Armstrong ===
Chloe Armstrong, (portrayed by Elyse Levesque), is the 23-year-old daughter of a US Senator, whose character is tested "after her father's tragic death and the dire circumstances of being trapped on a spaceship". Her father had political oversight over the Icarus project trying to dial the Stargate's ninth chevron. She holds a degree in political science from Harvard and she is also the aide of her father, Alan Armstrong, until he sacrifices himself in the pilot. She is pursuing a relationship with Matthew Scott while developing a strong friendship with Eli Wallace, who is romantically attracted to her. She is either oblivious to Eli's romantic feelings or she chooses to ignore them. She considers Eli her one true friend and says she realizes that before she met Eli, she never had a true friend. In Incursion, after being injured and trapped in the bow of the ship with Eli, she indicates she is aware of his romantic feelings although she does not say it out loud and Eli later kisses her on the cheek.

In the first-season episode, "Space", Chloe is taken captive by an unknown alien race who desires to capture the Destiny. She is placed in stasis, until Rush, who has been taken captive as well after Young abandoned him on a desert planet, rescues her and they both manage to escape the alien ship. In "Incursion (Part 2)", Chloe is shot in the leg while escaping the Alliance forces with Eli but is miraculously healed afterwards, although she cannot explain the phenomena. In "Pathogen", she discovers that she has been blacking out and reappearing at other locations in a daze, with no memory of how she got there. Under her trance state, Chloe is able to come up with solutions to equations related to Destiny that Rush has problems solving.

Rush and Young deduce she may have been infected with a pathogen by the aliens, who had captured her to serve towards an unknown goal. Rush comes up with the idea to use the Ancient repository chair to remove the pathogen from her brain, but he privately confirms her suspicions that she could not be cured and is now secretly using her to help unlock the Destiny's capabilities. Chloe's condition is later discovered again, and she is locked up.

Chloe had started changing into an alien and the blackouts started again. Eventually it got so bad that the crew was planning to put her off the ship at the next possible opportunity after Chloe had summoned the aliens, although she had claimed to be in control of herself and had a good reason for it. The crew ended up making a deal with the aliens to remove the pathogen, but Chloe retained the ability to do immensely complicated equations and believes that the aliens will be more determined than ever to capture Destiny with whatever they got from her.

=== Eli Wallace ===
David Blue as Eli Wallace

Eli Wallace (portrayed by David Blue) studied at the Massachusetts Institute of Technology (MIT), but dropped out before graduating due to his mother Maryann Wallace, a registered nurse (whom he lives with), who was infected by HIV due to a needlestick injury from an infected hypodermic needle while treating an HIV infected drug addict violently resisting treatment. Now struggling to help pay for the expensive medical bills before joining Stargate Command, Wallace was unemployed and spent most of his time playing video games, most notably Prometheus.

In the pilot episode, Eli solves a problem in the Prometheus video game, which was actually a mathematical proof procured from the Ancient Database. For this accomplishment, he is offered the opportunity to join the Icarus project to help Rush solve the mystery behind the ninth chevron of the Stargate, while the Air Force agrees to pay for his mother's treatment. He is later sent to Destiny as part of the group of refugees fleeing the Lucian Alliance attack. Shortly after arrival, Eli found "flying camera balls" he named "kinos" (essentially an advanced Ancient version of the M.A.L.P. probes used by Stargate Command). Eli records many of the crew's interactions and personal testaments for a documentary-like archive of their voyage on-board Destiny.

Eli has unrequited feelings for fellow Destiny crew-member Chloe Armstrong, which causes some occasional friction with his friend Lt. Scott (who is in a relationship with Armstrong). Eli later enters into a relationship with Lucian Alliance technical specialist Ginn, but this is tragically cut short by her murder at the hands of Alliance soldier Simeon.

==== Character arc ====
Eli was an extremely gifted child with both a high IQ and strong creative intuition. At age 14, he grew closer to his mother, Maryann, when his father abandoned them ("Time"). He was accepted into MIT's advanced mathematics program where he studied for several years. However, his mother, a nurse, contracted HIV from an accidental needle prick, and he dropped out of school to care for her. Needing a supplemental income and flexible work hours, he started several odd jobs when they were available; he often needed to quit because of the frequency and duration of his mother's treatments, as well as the unpredictable nature of acute attacks, leading to periods of unemployment.

During one such period in 2009, Eli discovered an online game called Prometheus, featuring several extremely difficult puzzles widely believed to be 'unsolvable' by the gaming community. In truth, the game itself was a recruiting tool developed by Stargate Command at the urging of Chloe Armstrong, who insisted that the medium might be an unconventional way of finding new talent. As such, the puzzles were based on real Ancient artifacts and calculations left behind in the Ancient Database, which required learning their alien language and solving mathematical proofs. Deeply engaged, Eli spent many of his off-work and unemployed hours for over a month solving the problem, only to have the game abruptly end upon solving the puzzle. Within a day of finding the solution, Dr. Nicholas Rush and General Jack O'Neill arrive in person to offer him a chance to see the fruits of his labor, but do not elaborate on the details. He politely refused, prompting them to beam him aboard the George Hammond; Rush wins Eli over by promising that the Air Force will provide his mother with the best medical care they have to offer.

Eli is transported to the Icarus Base to help Rush solve the mystery behind the ninth chevron of the Stargate. He jokingly gives himself the nickname "Math Boy" during a dinner conversation, which sticks. Though his formula is initially unsuccessful, during an attack on the base, Eli solves the problem under extreme pressure, allowing Rush to dial the ninth chevron. As a result, the remaining Icarus personnel are sent to the Destiny, an Ancient spaceship several billion light-years from Earth.

On Destiny, Eli quickly proves his value through his intelligence and creativity, and by rapidly translating many of the ship's systems and deciphering the technology on board; while not as fluent in the Ancient language as Rush, he demonstrates more adaptability in leveraging their discoveries, notably by using the Kino technology to scout gated worlds (sometimes acting as a 'black box'), record diaries from the crew, patrol as security drones, and improvise a material sled for hauling cargo. Each of the main leaders come to rely on Eli for different reasons: Rush respects Eli's intelligence, even when he secretly resents it; Young relies on Eli as a "second opinion" because he does not trust Rush; and Wray trusts his motivations, as she believes Rush does not want to return to Earth. As a consequence, Eli is a frequent participant in secret plans and meetings, causing the crew to come straight to him when they feel that they are being left in the dark.

As such, Eli increasingly confronts his own fears of abandonment and his self-doubts as the leaders and crew come to rely on him. He initially bonds with Chloe Bennet, hoping to pursue her romantically; however, her interest in Lt. Scott causes Eli to keep things platonic, becoming her most trusted confidant on the ship and a surrogate "big brother". Eli is particularly close to Sgt. Riley, with whom they share technical interests, and he is visibly distraught by Riley's death in the line of duty. His relationship with Rush is initially strained, as Rush sees him as a competitor and someone with "unearned" success, as Eli's natural intelligence and creativity are nearly on par with his own, even without having completed college or dedicating himself to years of additional study, as he did. Eli discovers that in an alternate timeline, he married Cpl. Barnes and started a family with her, though once the disaster that would have caused the schism is avoided, he decides against acting on this knowledge for the time being. Eli forms two unconventional friendships: one with Sgt. Greer, whom he respects and fears, and a second with Camile Wray who shares his homesickness.

In season 2, Rush quietly mentors Eli to develop greater objectivity and focus, with their relationship becoming less adversarial. After the Lucian Alliance boarding party is defeated on Destiny, Eli becomes infatuated with one of their technicians, Ginn. With some urging from Sgt. Greer, he romantically pursues her and they begin a relationship, which improves both his morale and confidence. Eli and Rush find that their relationship becomes more complicated when Ginn volunteers to use the Ancient Communication stones to swap places with Amanda Perry, a brilliant former colleague of Dr. Rush's with whom he becomes involved with romantically. Dr. Rush and Eli's relationship strains over the use the stones, as Rush's romantic gestures are physically shared with Ginn. In spite of this, Eli supports Ginn throughout the process and advocates forgiving her part in the Lucian raid. When Simeon, a Lucian alliance hard-liner, believes that Ginn has betrayed valuable intelligence, he murders Ginn while Amanda Perry is using her body. Eli is devastated by the loss, as is Dr. Rush, and both attempt to pursue Simeon with the intent of killing him in retaliation; however, Eli is talked down by Lt. Scott and Sgt. Greer, both of whom acknowledge that Eli is not a murderer. Even when Rush eventually does kill Simeon, Eli is still deeply disturbed by this chain of events. Later, when Ginn and Amanda Perry's memories resurface in Chloe when she uses the stones, Eli has a chance at closure by reuniting with Ginn, briefly, and by transferring her consciousness and memories to Destiny's computer banks, which Eli finds more satisfying than trying to avenge her.

The end of season 2 is a cliffhanger for which Eli is crucial: everyone on the ship has been put into stasis pods except for Eli, who volunteers to stay behind (in lieu of the untrustworthy Dr. Rush) to figure out how to fix the final, malfunctioning stasis pod so that he too can go into stasis. Before fixing his pod he goes to the observation deck and looks out at the stars as Destiny shuts down most of its systems around him. Eli smiles enigmatically as the show ends.

==== Conceptual history ====
"You tend to take parts of your roles home with you, which is why it's always good when you're playing a fun role."
—Blue talking about his work on SGU.

David Blue became a fan of Stargate SG-1 when it moved from Showtime to the SCI FI Channel (now known as Syfy) and used to watch it when he came home from school. He also later caught up with Stargate Atlantis. His interest in the franchise later influenced him to audition for one of the main roles. Blue was shooting a scene for an episode of Ugly Betty when he heard that the Stargate Universe producers were casting actors. He soon after had an audition and a screen test. Blue has commented that he wanted the role even more when he heard that Robert Carlyle had been signed on for a part.

Blue had never acted in the science fiction genre before being cast for Stargate Universe. Prior to Stargate Universe, he was best known for his portrayal of Cliff in Ugly Betty. Blue himself has said that Stargate Universe is "completely different" from his previous work.

=== Tamara Johansen ===
Alaina Huffman as Tamara Johansen

Tamara Johansen (portrayed by Canadian actress Alaina Huffman) is a USAF First Lieutenant. She comes from a modest background and dreamed of being a doctor but could not afford medical school and the Air Force was her best option. However, after receiving a scholarship, T. J. had elected to leave the Stargate program to attend medical school, much to the dismay of IOA representative Camile Wray. After Doctor Simms died during the attack on the Icarus Base, she ended up being the only person stranded aboard the Destiny with medical training. TJ was shown to be pregnant (with Col. Young's baby) in the middle of Season 1. Later, during the Lucian Alliance invasion of Destiny, TJ was shot and the baby died. However, TJ saw a vision of her baby being kept safe by Dr. Caine and some other Icarus refugees who had remained behind on the alien planet (named "Eden" by the crew) in the episode "Faith". Since Caine and the others' return (and subsequent death) without any memory of the baby in "Visitation" (episode 2.09), it is unknown whether the baby really died on-board Destiny, or underwent some other fate.

Johansen made her first appearance in the pilot episode, "Air", first broadcast in the United States and Canada in 2009. It was later revealed Johansen is pregnant with Colonel Young's child after the two had an affair before being stranded on the ship.

==== Character arc ====
Johansen comes from a modest background and dreamed of being a doctor, but could not afford medical school. Instead, she joined the Air Force. However, after receiving a scholarship, she elected to leave the Stargate program to attend medical school, much to the dismay of IOA representative Camile Wray. After Doctor Simms dies during the attack on the Icarus Base, she is the only medically trained person aboard the Destiny, and is forced to assume doctor-like responsibilities over the rest of the people aboard ship. Lieutenant Johansen is third in Destiny's chain of command, after Colonel Everett Young and First Lieutenant Matthew Scott.

In the pilot episode, it's said that TJ resigned from her position as paramedic, and although it's not revealed why, it's obvious Col. Young knows more about it. It's later revealed via a dream Col. Young has that he and TJ were romantically involved with each other prior to arriving on Destiny, and that when their affair ended, TJ decided to resign. While visiting an Earth-like planet, TJ tells Chloe that she is pregnant with Colonel Young's child, and that conception occurred about 15 weeks earlier, while they were still at the Icarus base. It is unclear if the pregnancy prompted her desire to resign her commission. In any event, although she was scheduled to leave two weeks before the evacuation to the Destiny, she did not leave as planned for reasons never made clear. Eventually she tells Young about the pregnancy, and he promises her they will make it work.

Weeks later, Destiny is taken over by the Lucian Alliance, and battle ensues. In the finale of the first season, TJ is shot in her abdomen, and although she survives, her very premature daughter does not. However, while unconscious, TJ sees a vision of her baby being kept safe by Dr. Caine and some other Icarus refugees who had remained behind on the alien Earth-like planet (named "Eden" by the crew) in the episode "Faith". This leads TJ to believe that some kind of mystical, religious force has protected her baby. However, some time later, Caine and the others return, without any memory of the baby in "Visitation" (episode 2.09). The people of Destiny believe that all of the people who had been left behind on the planet died, and the aliens who had made the planet resurrected them and returned them to the Destiny, but that they could not resurrect their souls, so all of them die again, after remembering the circumstances of their first death. Young believes that the Destiny implanted the memory into TJ in order to help her to cope with her baby's death. TJ still holds out hope that there was some truth to her vision.

TJ is well liked by everyone of the crew. Chloe starts to see TJ as her friend, and even Dr. Rush and Master Sgt. Greer, who generally do not like people, seem to have the utmost respect for her. As their time on the Destiny lengthens, TJ begins performing increasingly complicated medical procedures, including a kidney transplant. Nearing the end of the series she finds out that the alternate her on Novus died of ALS which cannot be cured, though they download some of the archives from the planet there is no cure found in the archives.

==== Conceptual history ====
In the character breakdown for the series, Tamara Johansen was originally named Tamara Jon, and was of Asian descent. After Huffman was cast for the role, the character's surname was changed to Johansen and her ethnicity was changed to European.

=== Ronald Greer ===
Jamil Walker Smith as Ronald Greer

Ronald Greer (portrayed by Jamil Walker Smith) is a USMC Master Sergeant, serving in the Stargate program at Icarus Base. Ronald Greer is a "big, strong, silent" Marine with a mysterious past who lacks control over his temper in non-combat situations. He is shown to be quick to anger, which Rush assumes is the result of having come from a poor background. Before the Lucian Alliance attack that led to the evacuation to Destiny, he was imprisoned and awaiting court martial for assaulting Colonel Telford. He is best friends with Lt. Scott.

==== Character arc ====
Greer is brought up by his loving mother Angela Greer and abusive father Reginald Greer. Greer's father deprived him of food; physically abused both his wife and Ronald; and would lock him away in a cupboard, making Greer claustrophobic in later life. Ronald enlists in the United States Marine Corps after failing to get the scholarship he was seeking. He eventually is incorporated into the Stargate Program at the rank of Master Sergeant, serving at Icarus Base. He is shown to be quick to anger, which Rush assumes is the result of having come from a poor background. Before the base attack that led to the evacuation to Destiny, he was imprisoned and awaiting court martial for assaulting Colonel Telford in front of a staff meeting at Icarus base prior to the attack. Greer's commanding officer, Everett Young, releases him after the base falls under attack, telling him to consider the charges against him dropped.

On board the Destiny, he works side by side with Matthew Scott, who was put in charge after Colonel Young was injured, following the attack on Icarus Base. On the first mission to retrieve a needed mineral off-world, Nicholas Rush reveals that Greer was not on his list for Icarus Base personnel.

==== Conceptual history ====
In early casting documents, Greer was named Ron "Psycho" Stasiak. Before working on Stargate Universe, Jamil was best known for his vocal portrayal of Gerald in the Nickelodeon animated series Hey Arnold!. Prior to auditioning, he was not a fan of the show; however, he did know about the Stargate franchise.

In an interview with Sky 1 'Stargate-superfan' Nidai, Jamil stated that he went into the audition 'not wanting the part', on the belief that if he didn't want it, he would end up getting it, due to previous experiences. Jamil described his character as a 'hard nut' and a 'tough guy', but saying underneath his character was a teddy bear. In an interview for MGM's Stargate Universe Character biography's, Jamil mentioned that his character's personal traits are all things that he himself wants to develop in his own life: "...he is disciplined, he is willing to die for something bigger than himself, he understands the power of being part of a team and leaving his ego at the door."

==== Reception ====
Maureen Ryan of the Chicago Tribune criticized the character portrayed by Jamil Walker Smith: "perhaps the intention was to have Master Sergeant Ronald Greer come off as a rebellious yet courageous hothead but the character is just a one-dimensional, obnoxious idiot". Brian J. Smith (who portrays the character of Matthew Scott from the series) called Jamil's Greer his favorite on the series; likewise, Jamil stated his favorite character was that of Scott. The character is compared to Eric Bana's character, "Hoot", in Black Hawk Down. Kevin Cole of Fused Film was very positive of Jamil's contribution to SGU: "He is a cowboy that will bring a lot of interesting development throughout the series. Walker really makes him work with casual smiles and little subtleties and nuances that this guy should have."

=== Camile Wray ===
Camile Wray (portrayed by Ming-Na Wen) was the head of human resources on Icarus Base, and becomes the highest-ranking IOA member stranded on-board Destiny, acting as the ship's de facto civilian leader (but still subordinate to Col. Young in the overall chain-of-command). As a result, Wray is Col. Young's main political adversary with her authority supported by the IOA leadership on Earth. Wray briefly took command of Destiny in the episode "Justice" when Colonel Young was suspected of murdering Sergeant Spencer. In the episode "Divided", she teamed up with Dr. Rush to lead a civilian coup d'état against military rule on the ship. She is the first openly LGBT character in the Stargate franchise and her long-time partner back on Earth, Sharon, first appeared in the episode "Life" in a recurring role.

Wray's character is initially described as having "a false sense of importance and superiority to the other military and civilian population along with a stubborn way of asserting it". Mallozzi thought in December 2008 that the character "has a lot of potential for getting under Young and co.'s skin. She's a definite love her or hate her type of character, one who'll prove the bane to many a series regular, and probably some viewers as well."

Initially considered as a potentially recurring character, she was listed as a part of the main cast in the pilot, but in subsequent episodes as a guest star. However, as of "Justice", on screen credits list her as part of the main cast.

== Recurring characters on Destiny ==
=== Darren Becker ===
Airman Darren Becker is portrayed by actor Jeffrey Bowyer-Chapman. He worked in the mess on Icarus base and is now stranded on the Destiny. His number one duty is to ration out the food and water at mealtimes, which are done in small groups scheduled twenty minutes apart. He was one of the people chosen in the lottery to survive the presumed destruction of the Destiny when it was on a collision course with a sun, but, fortunately, that was a false alarm and he returned to the Ancients' ship to once again serve protein powder meals in the mess.

=== Adam Brody ===
Adam Brody is portrayed by Australian actor Peter Kelamis. Brody is an engineer and knows how to read Ancient. He is used mostly in determining the function of various computer systems. His translations are sometimes incorrect, but for the most part, he is very competent at what he does. He was one of those chosen by lottery to board the only working shuttle and survive on a nearby planet when the Destiny appeared to be on a catastrophic collision course with a sun. Fortunately, that proved to be a false alarm, and Brody returned with the others to the Destiny. Brody developed a good working relationship with Sgt. Riley as the two were often called on to fix broken systems together due to their knowledge of the Ancient language. After Riley was injured trying to make sure that Col. Telford's science team didn't blow up the Destiny during their attempt to channel energy to the Stargate while the Destiny recharged its reserves inside a sun's corona, Brody chooses to support Dr. Rush, agreeing that the plan is too dangerous. Of the civilian science crew, Brody is the most dedicated and trustworthy according to Young; on orders from Young, Brody is the one who drains the air from Telford's room during his interrogation and ultimately seals in Rush's team during the incursion. Besides Dr. Rush, no other crewman has a matching overall knowledge of the ship and its functions. When Riley dies due to a shuttle accident, Brody takes it hard, visibly turning even more cynical about the ship's desperate situation.

Brody's handiwork extends beyond the ship's systems. He builds a Still with spare parts, giving the crew access to alcohol. In the penultimate season 2 episode 'Blockade', Colonel Young remarks that Brody can make more bullets to replenish their dwindling ammo supply.

=== Robert Caine ===
Doctor Caine is portrayed by Canadian actor and musician Tygh Runyan. Caine was on the first away team led by a civilian, chosen by Camile Wray who had taken command of the Destiny during Young's "trial" for the murder of Sgt. Spencer. The team, led by Dr. Dale Volker, went to a rocky planet they came upon a crashed space ship in a canyon. Caine detected no EM fields or radiation emanating from the alien vessel, and the rest of the team could find no immediate means of entry.

Caine describes himself as "just an IT tech", but he became familiar with the Ancient communication stones, as well as other systems aboard the ship. He was one of those who elected to stay behind on an alien planet named Eden in "Faith", due to him developing a belief in God. This changed Caine's entire personality. (1.13); He is seen again in "Visitation" (2.09) with the others who stayed behind. It is revealed that the others all died on the planet and were resurrected by unknown aliens only to die again on Destiny. Caine is not seen dying on the planet or on Destiny, so his fate is unknown. He was seen on the planet in the cold, so it is likely he died there from hypothermia.

=== Curtis ===
Master Sergeant Curtis is portrayed by Bradley Stryker. After arriving on Destiny, Curtis accompanied Lt. Matthew Scott to a desert planet. He, along with Jeremy Franklin and Andrea Palmer, believed that Nicholas Rush is more concerned about the ship than their survival. The three decided to explore one of the locked out addresses provided by the Destiny, but only Curtis and Palmer made it through; Franklin is shot by Ronald Greer on Rush's order before he can pass through the Stargate. Because Franklin was holding the dialing remote, Curtis and Palmer are stranded on the other side. Repeated attempts to contact them return only static, and they are left behind when the Destiny automatically returns to faster-than-light following the end of its 12-hour countdown.

=== Jeremy Franklin ===
Doctor Jeremy Franklin is portrayed by Mark Burgess. He assisted in the surveying of the Destiny and sealing leaks. He was one of the members of the first away team to a planet selected by the Destiny to help in the ship's air system repairs. When he was about to follow Andrea Palmer and Sgt. Curtis to another planet, Dr Rush ordered Greer to shoot him to prevent him from stepping through the Stargate to certain death. Lt. Tamara Johansen removed the bullet that had lodged in his right shoulder. He doesn't trust people in authority now that their food and water are being rationed, but has participated in away missions to gather food as well as to manage the hydroponics lab to grow food. Just after spotting the first sprout, Franklin decided to sit in the chair version of the Ancient Repository of Knowledge that was found in a newly discovered portion of the ship. Not meant for humans, whose physiology is somewhat different from that of the Ancients, Franklin effectively fried his brain and he was left in a catatonic state. Due to the events of the episode "Sabotage" (1.16), Franklin has apparently vanished while once again using the Ancient chair, but subsequently appears to Rush on the bridge. It's eventually revealed that the ship may have uploaded his consciousness and was using him to interact with Rush, before Rush shut it down. His body has never been found.

=== Vanessa James ===
Second Lieutenant Vanessa James is portrayed by Canadian actor Julia Benson. She was stationed at the Icarus Base before the attack. At the time of the evacuation, she is having an intimate relationship with First Lieutenant Matthew Scott, which they are trying to keep hidden from other personnel.

Benson previously portrayed Willa, a one-time character in the Stargate Atlantis episode "Irresistible". She was credited as Julia Anderson (her birthname) in this episode, but had subsequently married and changed her last name to Benson.

=== Andrea Palmer ===
Doctor Andrea Palmer is portrayed by Christina Schild. After arriving on Destiny, she was selected by Rush to go to a desert planet to find lime deposits which they needed to use to repair the ship's life-support system. Away from her superiors, Palmer told Curtis, Jeremy Franklin and Eli Wallace that Rush's only concern is repairing the ship. Curtis and Franklin agree, and, in spite of Eli's protests, decide to try one of the addresses the Destiny locked out. She and Curtis step through the Gate in the hope of finding a suitable planet to live on. Eli dials the planet several times after that to ascertain their fate, but cannot make radio contact. The Destiny ultimately departs without them.

=== Lisa Park ===
Doctor Lisa Park is portrayed by Canadian actress Jennifer Spence. Park was a scientist who participated in the Stargate Program, and was stationed at the Icarus Base. One of her first duties on the ship was to help Nicholas Rush repair the failing life support system. She worked alongside Adam Brody. In the 22nd "Kino" webisode, Park composed a video love letter to "Gary", but, due to a mistake with the pause button, left the camera running while she had sex with an unnamed shipmate. In "Blockade" Park volunteers to wear the third environment suit and harvest medicinal herbs in the hydroponics dome as the ship approaches a blue supergiant star to refuel. She is trapped in the dome, which loses pressure during the in-star transit. While Park survives, she is blinded by the intense, unfiltered sunlight.

=== Hunter Riley ===
Senior Airman Hunter Riley is portrayed by Haig Sutherland. In the pilot episode, his job includes dialing the Stargate and interpreting Ancient symbols and language. He identified the eight-symbol Stargate address which can connect to Earth, though it cannot be dialed due to power requirements. In "Aftermath", Riley suffers severe injuries in a shuttle crash and is unable to be extricated from the debris pinning him. Unwilling to die a slow death, Riley pleads with Colonel Young to end his life, which Young reluctantly does. (Note: Although Riley is referred to as a Sergeant, his rank insignia is that of a Senior Airman.)

=== Spencer ===
Sergeant Spencer is portrayed by Josh Blacker. Spencer was probably one of the most tightly wound people aboard the Destiny. He was eager to get home and looked out only for himself. He hoarded power bars and water when these items were being rationed. He attempted to start a riot during the lottery to select those who would survive on the shuttle when the Destiny appeared to be on a fatal collision course into a sun. Sgt. Greer struck him so hard that he lost consciousness and remained so long after the lottery was completed. He was caught hoarding and locked up by Lt. Johansen when Young was off-world, but the colonel let him out with a warning. A week after running out of a prescription sleeping medication, he committed suicide by shooting himself in the head with his service handgun.

=== David Telford ===
Lou Diamond Phillips as David Telford

Colonel David Telford, portrayed by Lou Diamond Phillips, is a recurring character on Stargate Universe. Telford does not make the journey to the Destiny, but is rescued by the Hammond and returned to Earth, effectively limiting the character's appearances in the series. In part three of "Air", he is revealed to be the main contact between Destiny and Earth, taking the majority of the shifts with the Ancient communication stones. In "Darkness", he seeks to get Colonel Everett Young replaced, having lost faith in his ability to command when he arrives in the middle of a complete power failure which he believes neither Young nor Nicholas Rush (at the time incapacitated after a nervous breakdown) saw coming.

He is revealed to be a traitor and spy—having been turned by the Lucian Alliance during an undercover assignment—passing confidential information of the SGC to the Lucian Alliance in the eighteenth episode, Subversion. The information the Lucian Alliance gained through Telford's espionage caused the deaths of at least thirty-seven people on a SGC outpost and the attack on the Icarus Base that caused many deaths, and the personnel fleeing by dialing the ninth chevron, leading them to their current situation aboard the Destiny. His spying reveals the Icarus program to dial the ninth chevron to the Lucian Alliance—which they show much interest in, wishing to wrest control of the ship from the SGC—and also allows the Alliance to capture the consciousness of Dr. Nicholas Rush while he is occupying Col. Telford's body while they are using an Ancient Communication Device. The Lucian Alliance uses Dr. Rush to further their attempts—after finding another Icarus-class planet—to dial the nine-chevron address to board and seize control of the Destiny. Telford is not a true Alliance member, but merely brainwashed. Telford is eventually freed from his brainwashing by Colonel Young, who by venting the atmosphere in Telford's compartment, temporarily kills him. Young then revives Telford. Killing and reviving him in that manner breaks Telford's brainwashing and he immediately tells Young all he knows, leading to an attack by the George Hammond on the Lucian Alliance base. Telford remembers everything he did under Alliance control and is truly horrified by it, showing that he is in fact a good man when not being controlled, and is grateful to Young for freeing him. When the Alliance arrives on Destiny with Rush in Telford's body, the connection between them is broken and Telford returns to his own body and remains free of the brainwashing. Telford pretends to still be brainwashed and on the Lucian Alliance side so he can aid the Destiny crew in the invasion and convinces Kiva to trust him. He aids the Expedition as a mole on the Alliance side and later shoots Kiva at the same time she shoots him. The bullet that hit him passed through cleanly and although he was in a lot of pain, he was not seriously wounded. Kiva, however, was hit in the liver and mortally wounded and died later despite Doctor Brightman and three other doctors efforts, leaving Dannic in charge. Simeon later confronts him about his shooting and Kiva's death and Telford claims they were ambushed and he didn't see who did it although Simeon doesn't seem to entirely buy his story. After Rush gave Dannic the ultimatum of surrendering or dying, Telford tried to convince Dannic to surrender telling him Rush wasn't bluffing. However, Dannic, who had been growing increasingly irrational, went insane and decided to die rather than surrender leading Telford to believe that Dannic wanted the ship for himself and not the Alliance. Dannic went to kill Telford, but was killed from behind by Ginn who had realized Telford was right and surrendered to Rush.

In the second-season episode "Awakening", when the Destiny stops nearby an Ancient Stargate seeding vessel, Telford goes on board as an escort to T.J. to evaluate a mysterious alien who has awakened inside the ship. Rush's idea to siphon energy from the seeding vessel to Destiny fails when the aliens incapacitate him and his guard and reverse the energy transfer. Telford volunteers to stay behind and attempt to stop the energy transfer from draining Destiny's reactors while the others retreat. However, he is left behind on the vessel when Rush manually decouples Destiny away in order to stop the transfer and Destiny goes into FTL. His fate is left unknown as more of the aliens awaken and surround him. Telford returns in the episode "Resurgence", where it is revealed the aliens, known as the Ursini, asked him for help against a hostile power. Telford stayed alive by eating consumables found in the alien stasis pods and worked with the Ursini to repair the seeding ship and go after the Destiny. The ship reaches the Destiny when it is under attack by drones and Telford goes back to the Destiny explaining the situation between the Ursini and the mysterious hostile race to Young and the others. He acts as liaison between the two forces and is deeply saddened by the Ursini's sacrifice for the Destiny crew.

In "Twin Destinies", a Telford from an alternate future makes it home to Earth in the present, coming from twelve hours in the future. When a Rush from the same future shows up, present day Telford is suspicious of his story and confronts him about it. Enraged, Future Rush accidentally shoves Telford into a live power conduit, electrocuting him to death, but the Telford from the future remains alive on Earth.

In "Alliances," the Telford from the future connects to Destiny to find out what happened and is informed of the death of his other self, though it is passed off as an accident. Telford doesn't seem to entirely believe the story, but lets it go in favor of warning the crew of a visit by Senator Michaels and Doctor Andrew Covel. On Earth, he greets Wray and Greer when they switch with Michaels and Covel and explains the Alliance threat to them. When the Alliance cargo ship crashes into the building, Telford makes it out and makes radio contact with Wray. He explains about the Alliance naquadria bomb and the fact that the bomb squad can't get in. Telford is reluctant to let Wray and Greer go after the bomb, but allows them to in the end as there is no choice. When Wray tries to contact him for disarming instructions, she is unable to get through as there's too much interference from radiation. In "Hope," over six days later, Telford connects with Destiny to inform the crew that there had been a problem with the communications stones on the Earth end and that the naquadria bomb had been successfully disarmed.

In "Blockade" when Eli and Rush come up with a plan to recharge Destiny inside a blue supergiant star, Telford switches with Lieutenant Matthew Scott to discuss the plan and doesn't like it, but agrees to pitch it to the people on Earth. However, he is informed that they're doing it and just letting him know, pointing out that he isn't even really there which makes him uncomfortable. In "Gauntlet", after learning that the drones are at every planet with a Stargate and every star between Destiny's position and the end of the galaxy, Rush and Young switch with people on Earth to let him know and ask for supplies from Earth which he says is impossible. After Eli comes up with a plan to skip the rest of the galaxy with the crew in stasis, Young visits Telford one last time to report and say goodbye. Telford asks if he'll go see his ex-wife, but Young tells him he's not going to reopen old wounds. Telford, feeling guilty for his part in their breakup while brainwashed, tries to apologize for what he did, but Young forgives him, saying his marriage was in trouble long before Telford came along. Before Young leaves, Telford promises to be waiting for him when he wakes up and to not give up on Young and the crew of Destiny which Young appreciates.

In the casting breakdown, he was called a proud and "stubbornly confident" lifelong military man holding the rank of colonel. Telford's given name was first disclosed by Joseph Mallozzi as "Zak, Zach, Zac, [or] Zack", but the official MGM website names him "David". The cast status of Lou Diamond Phillips as a permanent or recurring SGU actor was unclear. Philips was named in a press release along with the confirmed main cast in February 2009 but he appears in only five of the first nine episodes. He played the title role in a new stage musical in May 2009 and was a contestant in I'm a Celebrity…Get Me out of Here! in June 2009, both shows taking place during the shooting period of SGU. On September 22, 2009, a press release by SyFy detailing their October schedule, confirmed that Philips would indeed be a guest star.

=== Dale Volker ===
Doctor Dale Volker is an astrophysicist portrayed by Patrick Gilmore. During the evacuation, his arm is broken. He takes part in an inventory check after arriving on the Destiny and is dismayed to find all the boxes are labeled with a bar code and they have no bar code reader.

The character of Volker began as a simple side character, but actor Patrick Gilmore's excellent portrayal of Volker impressed show-runners and Volker has subsequently been given more screen time and more back story.

As season 2 progresses and Volker becomes even more prominent, he becomes more useful and productive within the science team. However, most of the science team are frequently critical of both his work and theories (especially Rush), though his usefulness seems to have improved greatly from season 1. He also seems to develop a friendship with Brody, possibly because Brody is the only one on the science team who is not immediately critical of any work he does.

In the second-season episode 'Hope', Volker suffers renal failure and undergoes a transplant operation with a Kidney donated by Sgt. Greer. Volker develops romantic feelings for Dr Park, though the feelings are not reciprocated.

=== Alan Armstrong ===
Senator Alan Armstrong is portrayed by Christopher McDonald, and appeared in the series pilot as a United States senator from California with political oversight over the Stargate program. Armstrong was on a tour of Icarus base with his daughter Chloe when the base was attacked by the Lucian Alliance, and was part of the group of refugees that fled through the Stargate to Destiny. He then sacrificed himself in order to seal a leak on board one of Destiny's shuttle-craft, so as to save his daughter and the rest of the crew. He has subsequently appeared as a hallucination to Chloe.

== Recurring Lucian Alliance characters ==
The Lucian Alliance was introduced in season 9 of Stargate SG-1, where their story arc was left unfinished. In the opening episode of Stargate Universe, "Air Part 1", three Ha'tak vessels, which at the time are presumed to be under the control of the Lucian Alliance, attack Icarus Base, forcing its personnel to evacuate through the stargate to the Ancient starship Destiny. The Lucian Alliance make an appearance in the last three episodes of Stargate Universe season 1, when it is revealed in the episode "Subversion" that Colonel Telford was a spy used to gather information on the Icarus Project, and confirmed that they were responsible for the attack on the Icarus Base. Rush is captured by Kiva, a human commander for the alliance, and uses him to finish the work they had started in creating a wormhole connection with Destiny. After the death of Kiva at the hands of Telford and being forced into an impossible situation by Rush, the Lucian Alliance forces on board Destiny surrendered and were taken prisoner before all but a select few of them were abandoned on another planet. • Producer Joseph Mallozzi explained in retrospect, "Much of the Lucian Alliance we saw in SG-1 was inept and, dare I say it, a bit goofy. They fit in with SG-1's lighter, more high adventure-driven tone but would have stood out (and not in a good way) in the new series [Stargate Universe]. As a result, I was initially leery at the prospect of introducing them to SGU but, as so often happened over the course of my many years in the franchise, I trusted in Brad [Wright] and Robert [C. Cooper] and, in the end, that trust was rewarded with a terrific story element that not only succeeded as planned (creating the chaos that leads to the Icarus evacuation in the pilot, seeding the mole throughline, and, later in season one, setting up the incursion scenario) but offered up plenty of interesting story material for future episodes (as evidenced in the first half of season two). The Alliance was always envisioned as a loose coalition of mercenary groups so it made sense that certain factions would have been more capable and threatening than others."

=== Varro ===
Varro is portrayed by actor Mike Dopud. As Commander Kiva's chief lieutenant in the Lucian Alliance, Varro was David Telford's primary contact on Earth when Telford was working as a sleeper agent. He led the Lucian strike team on board Destiny during the incursion where he was wounded during the gunfight. As negotiations commenced, Kiva forced T.J. to work on him before any of the other Lucian soldiers or the wounded civilians from the regular Earth crew until his prognosis improved. When he had sufficiently healed, he offered his thanks to T.J., who refused his gesture at making peace between the two crews. After Kiva's death in the shootout with Telford, Varro assumed command where he attempted to keep the Lucian factions together while acting in a humanitarian fashion toward the captured Earth crew and military personnel, stopping a blanket execution of the military personnel and devising a resourceful plan to recruit doctors from Earth to work on both sides using the Ancient communication stones. He is eventually usurped and abandoned along with the Lucian soldiers most loyal to him with the Earth crew. Upon the rescue of Col. Young and the Destiny crew, Varro and his people have rejoined the remaining Lucian factions on board. Later, when TJ checks his wound which is doing well, Varro tries to comfort her over the loss of her baby revealing some of his own history: he was married and his wife always worried about him on missions for the Lucian Alliance until she was killed in a storm in awning collapse. Due to this, Varro is able to understand what TJ is going through and can sympathize with her more than the rest of the crew. When most of the Alliance forces are abandoned on another planet, Varro is one of the few chosen to remain behind. He later makes a deal with Colonel Young to provide information for a rumored upcoming Alliance attack on Earth in exchange for their freedom on board the ship. It is revealed that while Varro and much of the Alliance members remaining on the ship are actually cooperating, Simeon is not which infuriates Varro. Varro develops a friendly relationship with TJ and approaches her about helping more after the betrayal of Simeon caused him to be locked up again. When Destiny comes into conflict with the alien drones, TJ calls him in to offer him to help her in the infirmary, which he accepts.

In the episode "Twin Destinies", in the alternate timeline Varro is one of the Destiny crew members that volunteers to remain behind with Rush when the attempt is made by the others to return to Earth. He is apparently killed when forced to travel through an unstable wormhole in an attempt to return to Earth.

Later, when Senator Michaels and Doctor Covel come aboard, TJ reveals she has had Varro start helping her out in the infirmary after the attack as he turns out to be pretty good at first-aid. The two are clearly at ease with one another and TJ trusts Varro enough to affirm that trust to Colonel Young. When Varro learns of the naquadria bomb on Earth, he offers his help in disarming it as he knows about that type of bomb. Using an FTL jump to temporarily sever the connection, Varro quickly tries to explain the process to Wray and Greer, but isn't able to finish in time. Eventually Rush figures out how to disconnect the Ancient communication stones and Varro explains it to Michaels and Covel so when they return to their own bodies, they can finish the disarming. Telford later reveals that the disarming is successful when he connects with a crew-member over six days later.

In "The Hunt", when TJ goes missing, Varro offers his and his people's help in searching for her as they are experienced hunters while the crew is not. While Young and Scott are reluctant to allow it, they do as they desperately need the help and Varro has a point. During the search, all of Varro's team is killed and Young is injured. Varro stops Greer from chasing after the creatures having realized it was smart and trying to lure him into a trap. Varro is able to temporarily stitch up Young's wound and convinces him to return to the ship as he would just slow them down. Young, showing trust in Varro, gives him his pistol and orders him to bring back TJ. Varro and Greer (who distrusts Varro) are forced to continue on alone and Varro admits that he's not sure he and Greer will be able to perform the rescue, but is willing to keep going. He compares Greer to a friend of his who died in a suicide mission, trying to convince him not to end up like that. When the two reach the creature's lair, Greer gives Varro C4 to create a distraction while he rescues TJ and Corporal Reynolds. Varro is successful and loses the creatures chasing him and hooks up with Greer, TJ and Reynolds who the creature let go when it realized they were intelligent. On the ship, Varro is released into the general population as a full crewmember at the recommendation of Greer (having apparently earned his trust during the rescue) and TJ visits him to give him her condolences on the death of his people and lets him know he isn't alone. The two nearly kiss, but Young interrupts as Varro had offered to help cook a "space deer" Greer killed and Airman Becker is ready. At a feast for the crew, Varro and Becker serve the deer, the first meat the crew has had in a while.

In "Epilogue", it is revealed that the Varro from the alternate timeline didn't die but ended up 2,000 years in the past with the rest of the crew minus Rush. He settles on the planet they name Novus and is disappointed when Young and TJ rekindle their relationship and start a family. At Scott and Chloe's wedding he develops an interest in Lieutenant Vanessa James and the two end up having a family. In the present, Varro helps gather supplies from the Novus bunker and rushes to TJ's side when it is learned she will have ALS in the future. He tries to comfort her, not knowing the disease isn't something you just catch and is slightly annoyed when Colonel Young arrives to comfort her. When the group learns that there's a cure in the Novus database, Varro votes to stay as long as possible to transfer all of it to Destiny in hopes of curing TJ, but an approaching fault line shuts down power and disrupts this. As the stairway collapsed several levels above and the elevator is out with the power, Varro is forced to climb an emergency ladder and saves TJ when she falls. However the ladder breaks and he falls too. After getting the others to safety, Young goes back for and rescues him. Varro survives, but is badly injured.

Later in "Blockade", a mostly recovered Varro travels to a Novus colony while Eli, Rush and Doctor Lisa Park stay behind on Destiny to recharge the ship in a bluegiant star. Young has him stay behind with most of the crew when some of them go to search the city, telling Varro to protect the remainder. When a drone approaches, alerted by Morrison trying to dial the Stargate, Varro teams up with Lieutenant James to take it down: James lures it in with a radio call and Varro destroys it with a rocket launcher. When the others return, James gives him the credit. Varro returns to the recharged ship ten minutes early with everyone else when a drone Command Ship arrives, forcing an immediate evacuation. In "Gauntlet", Varro goes into stasis with the rest of the crew after saying goodbye to TJ.

=== Ginn ===
Portrayed by actress Julie McNiven, Ginn is a member of the Lucian Alliance working toward taking over the Destiny during the incursion. As a technical expert and engineer, she initially works toward commandeering the ship's controls away from the Earth crew. During open hostilities with the Earth crew, Ginn sides with the most violent of the Lucian factions out of fear, mainly due to a brief physical assault by the faction's leader, Dannic, who threatened to kill her if she ceased being useful. With Varro and his soldiers off the ship, when Rush threatened to kill everyone on board (except for the few who managed to get behind protective shielding) with radiation, Ginn effectively ended the stalemate by shooting Dannic. She has since rejoined the other Lucian Alliance members. As Camile Wray has started making overtures at recruiting the more stable Lucian Alliance members to join the Destiny crew, Ginn is her initial point of contact. During their discussions, Ginn reveals that she was recruited into the alliance by force as a child when local Lucian warlords forcibly conscripted her planet at gunpoint. Ginn is later allowed to join Eli's research, and the two begin an intimate romantic relationship. She is murdered by Simeon when he kills Amanda Perry while the two have switched bodies. Thanks to her help, Eli is able to develop a way to dial Earth from within a star that in an alternate future allows David Telford to get home, but also causes the ship and crew to be thrown 12 hours into the past and for everyone else to die before the Nicholas Rush from that timeline changes the timeline. It is later shown that her consciousness survived inside the Ancient communication device, and she resurfaces in Chloe when Chloe attempts to connect to Earth. She is unaware of her death and is horrified by the news. She kisses Eli, but he rebuffs her as it is too strange when she is in Chloe's body. During her time in Chloe's body, she seems to re-experience her strangling death several times and her consciousness grows weaker, allowing Chloe and Amanda Perry (who also survived in the device) to surface. Eventually a plan is devised to upload her into the ship's mainframe, in hopes of being able to download her into another body in the future. Ginn is initially hesitant, but Eli convinces her, telling her it will be worth it to be able to interact with the ship's crew and survive. During the transfer, Ginn experiences another choking incident where she seems to see Simeon killing her, which causes a power surge, but the transfer is successful. Ginn, now a part of the ship, later appears to Eli and tells him he was right about it being worth it to be part of the ship and interact with him, but appears saddened that she can't touch him. According to Eli the two later have an argument about using the interface chair to interact physically as it is dangerous and she doesn't appear to him for days. Eli believes it's because she's angry and upset, but in truth it's because Amanda Perry, who has accidentally trapped Rush in a simulation, is suppressing her in an attempt to fix the problem on her own leaving her unable to respond to Eli's calls for her. Eli also believes that Perry got the idea to put Rush in the interface chair from her. Distracting Perry with an emergency FTL drop-out, Ginn manages to appear to Eli and tells him that he's the only one that can free Rush and starts to tell him how, but is suppressed by Perry again. Eli figures out what she means anyway and moves her and Perry into quarantine in the ship's mainframe, locking them out from all the systems. This leaves Eli devastated and furious at Rush.

=== Simeon ===
Simeon, portrayed by veteran television and film actor Robert Knepper, is introduced as a Lucian Alliance soldier during the incursion. His loyalties so far have remained vague except to support the strongest or most capable leader at any given time, first following Commander Kiva, then Varro, and then Dannic until the incursion comes to an end. Of the Lucian soldiers, he is the only one to doubt Telford's account of the shootout with Commander Kiva, questioning how Telford could have been taken by surprise and shot in the front instead of his back. Besides Varro, he is the most analytical of the Lucian soldiers. After the incursion, Simeon proves to be unwilling to mix with the rest of the Destiny crew and Greer takes it upon himself to keep him under close scrutiny while he moves around the ship. He also refuses to share information with the crew, giving them false information and is mad when he discovers everyone else is cooperating. He later murders Ginn and Amanda Perry as Ginn reveals to Earth that he has the information Earth needs about a possible attack against it and escapes from the ship, killing a few crew-members along the way. He battles the crew on a desert planet and indicates that the attack on Earth is retaliatory and that his own family was affected in someway by the war with Earth so he wants revenge. The crew all give up except Rush (wanting revenge for Perry's murder) who causes a stampede which runs right over Simeon, severely injuring him. Helpless and at Rush's mercy, Simeon pleads that he has critical information, but Rush just shoots him in the head, killing him in revenge for Perry's death.

== Recurring characters on Earth ==
=== Carl Strom ===
Carl Strom is portrayed by actor Carlo Rota. Strom is an IOA representative and Camile Wray's supervisor, Carl Strom believes that the IOA should have full control of the Destiny. He does everything he can to see that this becomes a reality.

=== Emily Young ===
Emily Young is portrayed by Ona Grauer, who previously played the Ancient Ayiana in SG-1 and Atlantis. Emily Young is Col. Everett Young's wife who was upset when her husband took the position as the Icarus Base commander. When Young visited her in Col. Telford's body, Emily could barely take in the news of her husband's situation. Not knowing if or when Everett will return home, Emily seemed ready to divorce him on the spot, but she wished him well and that he would remain safe. When Young came back for another visit, Emily was more sympathetic with his situation and even had sexual intercourse with him while he was in Col. Telford's body. It is suggested that she is having an affair with Telford—as himself, not containing her husband's consciousness—herself, but Lou Diamond Phillips deconfirmed this in an interview. Telford later attempted to put a wedge between Young and Emily by telling Emily that Young had resumed his affair with Lt. Tamara Johansen on the Destiny. It is likely Telford did this to cause Young problems. It is later revealed that Telford was brainwashed at the time he did that and is horrified by it along with everything else he did after Colonel Young freed him. She eventually asks for a divorce from Young which he apparently gives her. When Young is about to go into stasis for three years, he decides not to go see her, saying it'll just reopen old wounds and he doesn't want that. When Telford tries to apologize for his role in the breakup of the marriage, Young forgives him saying Emily and himself had had problems long before Telford intervened.

== Stargate crossover characters ==
Several characters who initially appeared in Stargate SG-1 or Stargate Atlantis have made appearances in Universe. From the beginning, Robert C. Cooper had ruled out the permanent inclusion of any well-known characters from the two previous Stargate series, although "there will certainly be plenty of opportunity for cross over, and there certainly might be some familiar faces in the premiere and in subsequent episodes".

- Jack O'Neill (played by Richard Dean Anderson) in "Air" (Part 1+3), "Earth", "Subversion", "Incursion" (Part 1)
- Samantha Carter (played by Amanda Tapping) in "Air" (Part 1), "Incursion" (Part 1)
- Daniel Jackson (played by Michael Shanks) in "Air" (Part 1), "Human", "Subversion", "Incursion" (Part 1)
- Major Marks (played by Martin Christopher) in "Air" (Part 1)
- Walter Harriman (played by Gary Jones) in "Air" (Part 1)
- Bill Lee (played by Bill Dow) in "Air" (Part 2) and "Twin Destinies"
- Rodney McKay (played by David Hewlett) in "Seizure"
- Richard Woolsey (played by Robert Picardo) in "Seizure".
  - Brad Wright had approached Picardo at the beginning of SGU season 1, and Picardo had declared his interest in appearing early on in the show.

== See also ==
- List of Stargate SG-1 characters
- List of Stargate Atlantis characters
