= Julia Benson =

Canadian actress

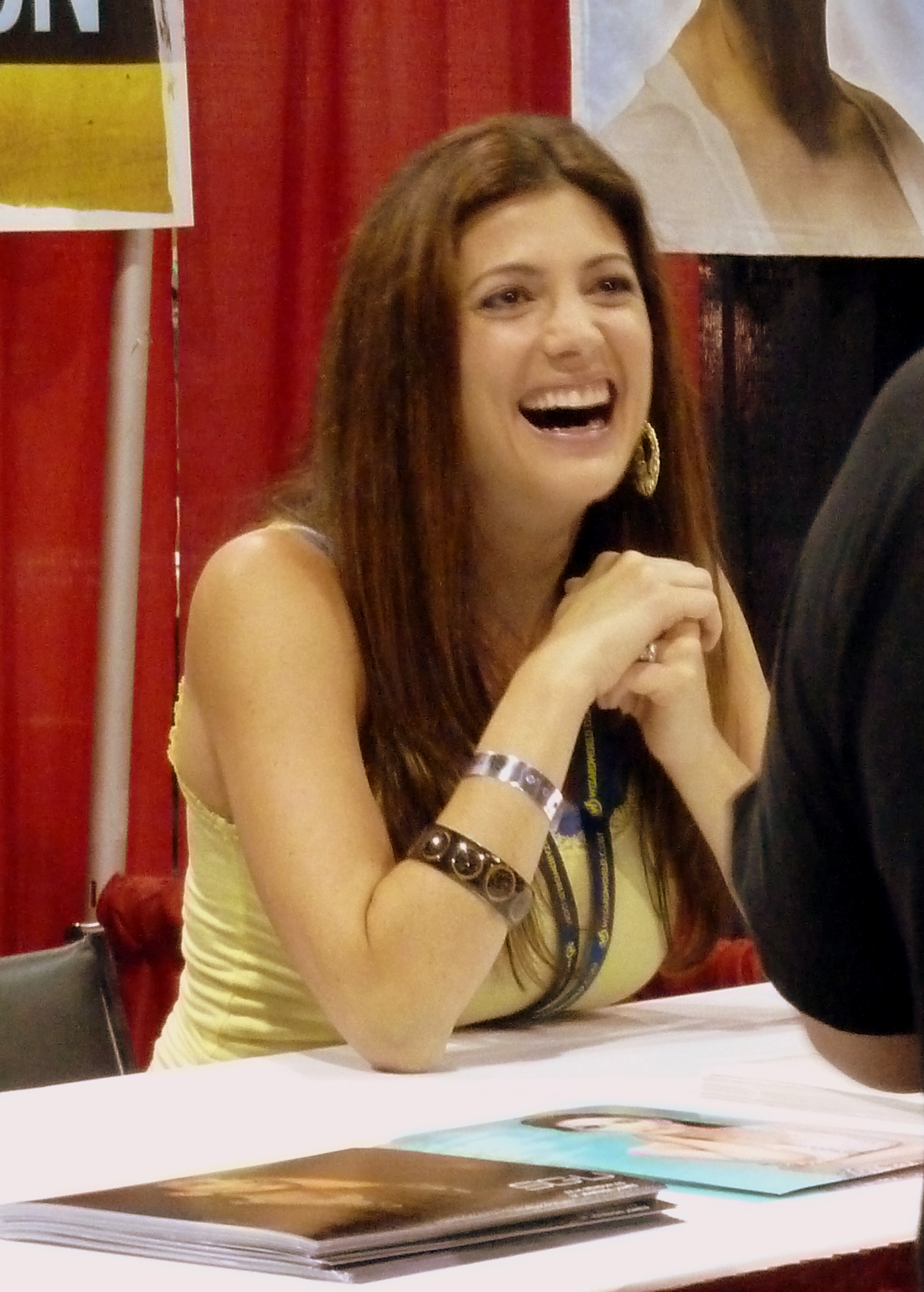
- Julia Benson at 2011 Wizard World Chicago
- Born: Julia Anderson; 26 June 1979 (age 47); Winnipeg, Manitoba, Canada
- Occupation: Actress
- Years active: 2003–present
- Spouse: Peter Benson (m. 2009)
- Children: 1

Julia Benson (née Anderson; 26 June 1979) is a Canadian actress. She played the character Vanessa James in the science fiction series Stargate Universe.

== Early life ==
Julia Anderson was born in Winnipeg, Manitoba, Canada. She trained as a ballet, tap, jazz dancer since age six. She graduated from the University of British Columbia (Vancouver) in 2001 with a degree in theatre and psychology. She trained as an actress at David Mamet's Atlantic Theater Company in New York City.

== Career ==
Benson played the role of Anna in the 2007 film Road to Victory about a stripper who falls in love with a football player who is unable to sexually perform due to an injury. She trained with a dancer from Brandi's strip club in Vancouver, British Columbia.

From 2009 to 2011, Benson appeared as 2nd Lt. Vanessa James in both seasons of TV science fiction series Stargate Universe. Her performance in the show's first-season episode "Pain" earned her a 2010 Leo award as "Best Supporting Performance by a Female in a Dramatic Series".

== Filmography ==
=== Films ===
Year	Title	Role	Notes
2005	Crazy Late	Sarah Jones	Short film
2007	Road to Victory	Anna	
2007	Zero Hour	Allie	
2007	Numb	Sara's Girlfriend	
2008	Blonde and Blonder	Last Dancer in Line	
2008	Robin, Chuck, and Shirley	Shirley Sutherland	Short film
2009	Scott's Lands	Melissa	Short film
2009	Everything's Coming Up Rosie	Catherine	Short film
2012	Now and Forever	Lucy Redd	Short film, completed
2012	Death Do Us Part	Kennedy	Post-production
2013	Kid Cannabis	Julie Morgan	Post-production
2013	Leap 4 Your Life	Julianna	Post-production
2013	That Burning Feeling	Joyce	
2014	Death Do Us Part	Kennedy Jamieson	Producer, Writer
2014	What an Idiot	Jackie	
2015	Dead Rising: Watchtower	Amy	
2016	Interrogation	Sara Ward	
2017	My Little Pony: The Movie	Additional voices	
2018	To All the Boys I've Loved Before	Ms. Kavinsky	
TBA	The Ferret Squad	Marcie	In production
2022	Hello, Goodbye, And Everything In Between	Claudia	

=== Television ===
Year	Title	Role	Notes
2003	Tru Calling	Tara	Episode: "Past Tense"
2005	The Dead Zone	Crying Girl	Episode: "The Collector"
2006	The Evidence	Sadie McAbee	Episode: "Stringers"
2006	Stargate Atlantis	Willa	Episode: "Irresistible"
2007	Masters of Horror	Abbey Addison	Episode: "Right to Die"
2007	My Neighbor's Keeper	Mom	TV film
2007	Reaper	Gloria	Episode: "All Mine"
2007	Supernatural	Woman at Bar	Episode: "Sin City"
2007	Whistler	James	Episode: "Passion Plays"
2007	Aliens in America	Clerk	Episode: "Church"
2008	Past Lies	Sarah	TV film
2008	The Unquiet	Christina	TV film
2008	Smallville	Nurse	Episode: "Arctic"
2009	Mr. Troop Mom	CC Turner	TV film
2009	Harper's Island	Officer Tyra Coulter	Episode: "Snap"
2009	SGU Stargate Universe Kino	Vanessa James	Episode: "Covered Kino"
2009–11	Stargate Universe	Lt. Vanessa James	Recurring role (36 episodes)
2010	The Ex-Convict's Guide	Shirley Sutherland	Episodes: "Be Gracious", "Respect the Rules of the House", "Do Not Convert Your Host's Possessions – Into Weapons", "Remember to Bid Your Host a Gracious Farewell!"
2010	Lying to Be Perfect	Joy	TV film (Lifetime)
2010–11	SGU Stargate Universe Kino	Vanessa James	Episodes: "Wait for It", "Favorite Meal of All Time", "One Long Endless Night", "All the Stages"
2011	Shattered	Hostess	Episode: "Unaired Pilot"
2011	Hiccups	Penelope	Episode: "Welcome Back Potter"
2011	R.L. Stine's The Haunting Hour	Mom	Episodes: "Brush with Madness", "Sick"
2011	Earth's Final Hours	Chloe Edwards	TV film
2012	Mr. Young	Bianca Boyd	Episode: "Mr. Sci-Fi"
2013	Chupacabra vs. the Alamo	Tracy	TV film (Syfy)
2014–15	Cedar Cove	Jeri Drake	Episodes: "Trials and Tribulations", "One Day at a Time", "Point of No Return", "Secrets and Lies", "Stand and Deliver", "Resolutions and Revelations", "Hello Again", "A Helping Hand", "Civil War", "Batter Up", "Runaway", "The Good Fight"
2017	A Bramble House Christmas	Molly	Television film (Hallmark)
2018	Marrying Father Christmas	Ellie Whitcomb	Television film (Hallmark Movies and Mysteries)
2018	Reap What You Sew: An Aurora Teagarden Mystery	Lizzie Allison	Television film (Hallmark Movies and Mysteries)
2019	The Order	Professor Robin Benson	3 episodes
2019	Aurora Teagarden Mysteries: An Inheritance to Die For	Lizzie Allison	Television film (Hallmark Movies and Mysteries)
2019	BH90210	Female Exec	Episode: "The Pitch"
2020	Love is a Piece of Cake	Suzanne Cooper	Television film
2020	Chateau Christmas	Kate	TV film
2021	Seasoned With Love	Winona Applegate	Television film, with Peter Benson
