= Jamil Walker Smith =

American actor (born 1982)

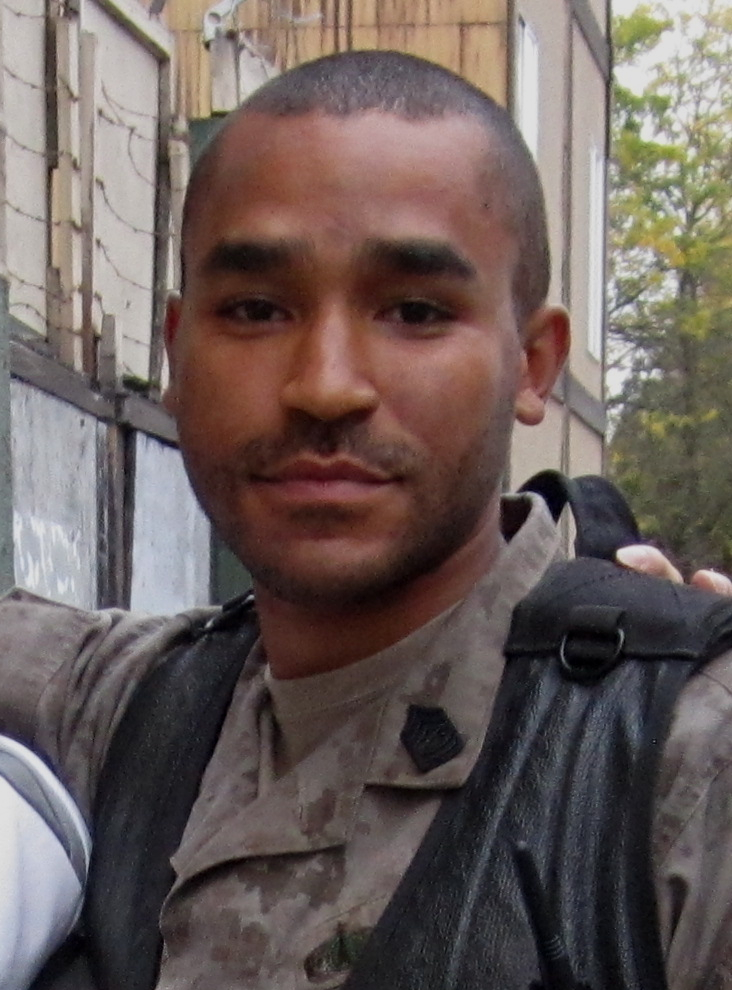
- Smith in 2010
- Born: August 20, 1982 (age 43); New York City, New York, U.S.
- Other names: Jamil Smith, Jamil Walker
- Occupations: Actor; director; producer; writer
- Years active: 1994–present
- Known for: Gerald Johanssen (Hey Arnold!); Ronald Greer (Stargate Universe)

Jamil Walker Smith (born August 20, 1982) is an American actor, director, producer and writer. His best known role is as the voice of Gerald, a fourth grader and Arnold's best friend in the Nickelodeon animated TV series Hey Arnold!. He also appeared on several shows like Sister, Sister; Girlfriends; Bones; The X-Files; and The Bernie Mac Show. He is an actor by trade and writes, acts and directs his own short film projects. He played Master Sergeant Ronald Greer in both seasons of Stargate Universe.

== Early life ==
Smith was born on August 20, 1982, in New York City, New York. Smith has been a professional actor since the age of 6, performing in local theaters in Los Angeles, where he was nominated for two NAACP Theatre Awards and was selected as a California Arts Scholar. Smith's first job in the business was at the age of 12, guest starring in an episode of the Fox sitcom The Sinbad Show. Smith majored in Theater Arts at SUNY Purchase. Smith is managed by Luber Roklin Entertainment.

== Career ==
Smith wrote, directed and fully financed The American Dream, a narrative feature for which he won the New Visions Award at Cinequest and Best Director at Urbanworld Film Festival. Smith most recently starred in the latest feature from the Bellflower filmmakers, Chuck Hank and the San Diego Twins. Smith also appeared on NBC's Ironside, and was a series regular on the Syfy Network's Stargate Universe. Smith wrote and directed the short film, The Son, which premiered at Urbanworld, where he met programmer Brittany Ballard and together they decided to launch Little Plow Films. Smith co-wrote and directed I Want to be Ready, the screen adaptation of Ayelet Waldman's acclaimed novel, Daughter's Keeper, for which he holds the film/TV option. Smith is currently premiering Wild Geese, his first short work as co-writer/co-director at international film festivals throughout 2013–2014, while he develops his third feature, Steal That Horse, an original narrative he co-wrote, will co-direct and star in this fall. Smith has also written The Pyn, a satirical romp through the prison industrial complex, which he plans to direct in 2015. Smith teaches acting at Baldwin Hills Elementary School. Smith won the 2013 New Leaders Council "40 Under 40" Media Leadership Award. He appeared on General Hospital in 2014 as "Immigration Agent" Jeffery Scribner.

== Filmography ==
=== Film ===
Year	Title	Role	Notes
1994	Hey Arnold!: 24 Hours to Live	Gerald Johanssen (voice)	Short film
2002	Hey Arnold!: The Movie	Gerald Johanssen / Rasta Guy (voices)	
2005	Halfway Decent	Tom Jr.	
2007	The Son	The Son	Short film
2008	In the Wind	Shuky	Short film
2010	Quit	Confidence Man	
2010	Make a Movie Like...	Luis	
2011	The American Dream	Luis	Director and screenwriter
2017	Newness	Chef Dominic	
2017	Hey Arnold!: The Jungle Movie	Paulo / Pirate 2 / Guard 2 (voices)	

=== Television ===
Year	Title	Role	Notes
1994	The Sinbad Show	Ernie	Episode: "Love Lessons"
1995	A Whole New Ballgame	Guest star	Episode: "Opening Day"
1995	The X-Files	Chester Bonaparte	Episode: "Fresh Bones"
1995	ABC Weekend Specials	Temba	Episode: "Jirimpimbira: An African Folk Tale"
1995	Hangin' with Mr. Cooper	Jake	Episode: "The Matchmaker"
1996–2004	Hey Arnold!	Gerald Johanssen (voice)	79 episodes
1996	Sister, Sister	Mike	4 episodes
1996–97	Waynehead	Mo' Money Jr.	13 episodes
1997	Pacific Blue	Hunchey	Episode: "Runaway"
1997	Touched by an Angel	Darnell	Episode: "Nothing But Net"
1997	413 Hope St.	Tyreak Thomas	Episode: "Quentin Goes Home"
1999	Promised Land	Jimmy Gibson	Episode: "A Day in the Life"
2001	NYPD Blue	Michael Murray	Episode: "Mom's Way"
2002	Philly	Darnell Lane	Episode: "Mojo Rising"
2002	The Bernie Mac Show	Skateboarder	Episode: "Mac Local 137"
2005	Blind Justice	Deshawn Oliver	Episode: "Up on the Roof"
2005	Medium	Raymond Vargas	Episode: "Pilot"
2005	Supernatural	Luis	Episode: "Pilot"
2007	Girlfriends	Kenny Phelan	2 episodes
2007	Cold Case	Malik/Theseus	Episode: "It takes a Village"
2007	Celebrity Deathmatch	50 Cent (voice)	Episode: "Where's Lohan?"
2008	Bones	Colby Page	Episode: "Player Under Pressure"
2009–11	Stargate Universe	Ronald Greer	Main cast (40 episodes)
2010	Canada AM	Himself	Interview
2013	Ironside	Guest star	Episode: "Uptown Murders"
2014	General Hospital	Jeffrey Scribner	Recurring role
2016	Pure Genius	Sergeant Ryan Hamilton	Episode:"You Must Remember This"
2022	The Rookie (TV series)	Curtis Jones	3 episodes

=== Video games ===
Year	Title	Role
2004	Shark Tale	Bernie / Additional Tenant Fish
2004	Shark Tale: Fintastic Fun!	Bernie
2004	Grand Theft Auto: San Andreas	Pedestrian
