= Nicholas Rush =

Fictional character from Stargate Universe

- Robert Carlyle as Nicholas Rush
- First appearance: "Air"
- Last appearance: "Gauntlet"
- Portrayed by: Robert Carlyle

In-universe information
- Occupation: Stargate Command; Scientist personnel
- Family: Gloria Rush (wife, deceased)

Dr. Nicholas Rush is a fictional character in the 2010 Canadian-American Metro-Goldwyn-Mayer-Syfy television series Stargate Universe, a military science fiction serial drama about the adventures of a present-day, multinational exploration team unable to return to Earth after an evacuation to the Ancient spaceship Destiny, which is traveling in a distant corner of the universe. He is portrayed by Scottish actor Robert Carlyle. Carlyle, while at first skeptical towards the show, got an interest in the character of Rush because he felt Rush was a "very interesting" character to portray.

Rush is a Machiavellian scientist whose life's work is uncovering the mysteries behind the ninth chevron of the Stargate, which ultimately leads him and personnel from the Icarus Base through the Stargate to a far-away galaxy where they must fight for their own survival. Rush made his first appearance in the pilot episode, "Air", first broadcast in the United States and Canada in 2009.

== Character arc ==
In "Air", Rush is revealed to have come from a poor background. His father worked at the shipyards in Glasgow, Scotland. He studied at Oxford University whilst working two jobs. As a result, he believes he has earned the right to give orders to others without being questioned. In the episode "Human", Rush is seen in his flashbacks as giving a lecture at a university, and at least two people have characteristic "Cal" clothes, suggesting that he was teaching at University of California, Berkeley.

Rush is an expert in Ancient technology. His research was hindered while he was married to Gloria Rush (Louise Lombard). Since her death, he has become more dedicated to science. He spearheads the Icarus Project, his main priority being to explore the mystery behind the ninth chevron of the Stargate. Rush was stationed at the Icarus Base in 2009, in order to do research on the ninth chevron. Rush had a hand in selecting the personnel, and notes that Ronald Greer and Matthew Scott were not among those he would have approved.

During an attack on the base, Rush and Eli Wallace figure out how to dial the ninth chevron, and are responsible for sending the remaining Icarus personnel to an Ancient ship known as the Destiny, a spaceship situated in a far-away galaxy, with no way of returning to Earth. Halfway through the first season, the crew discovers an early version of the Ancient repository of knowledge, which may provide crucial details for full manual control of Destiny and a way to return to Earth. However, Young explicitly forbids anyone from using it, citing dangerous circumstances of previous encounters with such devices. In response, Rush capitalizes on the suspicious death of a crew member to frame Young for murder, thereby forcing a temporary leadership change which allows a science team to activate the device. When Young is vindicated and learns of this duplicity, he confronts Rush, eventually battering him unconscious, and strands him on a planet alone with what seems to be a wrecked alien starship. Rush then attempts to fix the craft and is captured by an alien race that is aware of the Destiny and desire to capture it. He manages to escape and make his way back to the Destiny, where he and Young make a deal not to disclose the events where Young left him to die. However, in the following episode Rush rallies the civilian population of Destiny and threatens to starve the military population into submission. It's also revealed that the Aliens had implanted a tracking device in Rush and used it to find Destiny and attacked them. In the middle of the attack the implant was removed and Destiny escaped.

In "Subversion", Rush suspects Colonel Telford of being a spy for the Lucian Alliance, after experiencing a blended memory caused by the side effect of using the communication stones. Under General Jack O'Neill and Colonel Young's plan, Rush is sent into Telford's body and tries to uncover evidence of his relation with the Alliance while Daniel Jackson shadows him. However, the Lucian Alliance suspects that the Telford they are meeting with is in fact someone else, and Rush is then kidnapped and tortured into revealing his true identity. Learning who he is, Kiva, the leader of the Alliance group, uses him to unlock the ninth chevron on a Stargate under their command on another planet and use it to transport on board Destiny and take it over. Rush is returned to his own body when he returns to Destiny and manages to escape detection while the Alliance attempt to take over the ship. He eventually gains control of Destiny's shield systems and threatens to expose the Alliance to deadly radiation from a nearby pulsar until they finally surrender. At the beginning of the second season, Rush is revealed to have discovered the control bridge of Destiny for some time while exploring the ship and kept it secret from the rest of the crew. He is now able to control the warp navigation system and steer the Destiny anywhere he wants. However, due to further experimentation with the ship's controls, Rush indirectly causes the loss of two of the crew. (Riley in "Aftermath" and Telford in "Awakening"). He is also revealed to have been trying to solve equations pertaining to Destiny by writing them all over the walls of an unused corridor.

In "Pathogen", Rush deduces that Chloe, who has been blacking out and reappearing in a trance, has been infected by a pathogen introduced by the aliens who captured both of them in "Space". He comes up with an idea to use the Ancient repository chair to cure Chloe of the pathogen. After Rush is pressed by Chloe after the treatment, he admits that he knows that she wasn't cured. Rush intends to use Chloe's advanced intelligence while in her trance state to help him solve his equations, while disregarding the danger she may pose.

== Conceptual history ==
=== Conception and casting ===
"I do get drawn to these outside-the-box type characters. People that don't really fit in, that have their own kind of world going on in their head the whole time. I enjoy characters like that, I enjoy playing people like that and Rush is certainly like that."
— Robert Carlyle talking about why he chose the role.

Before being contacted by Brad Wright and Robert C. Cooper, Robert Carlyle had watched the original feature film, Stargate (1994) and had been aware of Stargate SG-1 and Stargate Atlantis. He was sent around 200 episodes of the franchise, concluding that he was "more impressed by SG-1 than Atlantis", but felt the producers had "something."

While at first reluctant because it was different from his earlier work, he had no negative views of science fiction and was a fan of Star Trek: The Original Series when he was a child.

Carlyle was then again contacted by Wright and Cooper, the first thing Carlyle said to them was "Guys, I'm really flattered, but why do you want me to do this?", the two replied laughing, saying "Well, what do you mean?" Carlyle replied "My style is not what you’ve been doing. I can adapt and I can change and stuff like that, but I don’t think I would necessarily want to specifically for this," further saying he was not in the same mold as Richard Dean Anderson (Jack O'Neill) and Joe Flanigan (John Sheppard). Cooper told him Stargate Universe would become a "very different Stargate", with a new way of telling the stories and a different style, which was one of the reasons for choosing Carlyle for the main role. After the discussion, Wright and Cooper sent Carlyle the script for the pilot episode. Carlyle felt it was a "quite complex" story, which made him interested in the character of Rush.

=== Development ===
After finishing casting the character, most of the script work was done by Brad Wright. Robert Carlyle felt the character was so well made, that it had to be something both Wright and Robert C. Cooper had thought about for years. When the script is finished, Carlyle is allowed to rearrange sentences throughout the various scripts. Carlyle called the working relationship between Wright and Cooper, "a wonderful collaborative relationship." When asked if he would return for future seasons, Carlyle replied "I must say that I'm really enjoying this—more than I ever would have believed. So if this character remains interesting to play, then I'll keep doing this until they give me the hook."

== Reception ==
Overall, the character was positively received. The New York Times reviewer Mike Hale while positive towards Stargate Universe, he said it only had "one ace up its sleeve", that being Robert Carlyle. Hale praised his acting for being of an "entirely different caliber" than previous stars such as "Richard Dean Anderson, Michael Shanks and Amanda Tapping". A reviewer from The Boston Globe, who reviewed the pilot episode, "Air", felt that the characters were portrayed by many "formidable actors", but the most notable was the "always-wonderful" Carlyle. Mark Wilson from About.com said, "Carlyle is forced to play a tough game... and he does it well." An unnamed reviewer from The Straits Times said the character left "viewers delightfully confused" to the question, is he good or bad?
