= Sonata (Moonlight) =

- Moonlight episode
- Mick tells Beth that he loves her, and they kiss.
- Episode no.: Season 1 Episode 16
- Directed by: Fred Toye
- Written by: Ethan Erwin; Kira Snyder
- Production code: 116
- Original air date: May 16, 2008

Guest appearances
- Jacob Vargas; David Blue; Eric Winter; Heather Stephens; Claudia Black; Erika Schaefer

Episode chronology
← Previous "What's Left Behind"	Next → —

"Sonata" is the season and series finale of the American paranormal romance television drama Moonlight, which first aired on CBS on May 16, 2008 in the United States. It was written by Ethan Erwin and Kira Snyder, and directed by Fred Toye. The series revolves around Mick St. John (Alex O'Loughlin), a private investigator who has been a vampire for over fifty years. When a vampire threatens to name all the vampires of Los Angeles, Mick is helped by his girlfriend Beth Turner (Sophia Myles) and the rest of the vampires to track her down.

Due to the 2007–2008 Writers Guild of America strike, production of Moonlight halted on December 19, 2007, and only twelve episodes of the original thirteen-episode order were made. Once the Writers' Strike ended, CBS announced that Moonlight would return April 25, 2008 with four new episodes, to be part of the series' first season. On May 13, 2008, CBS announced that Moonlight was officially canceled. "Sonata" was watched by 7.47 million viewers upon its original broadcast, and received generally positive reviews for providing closure of the characters and storylines.

== Plot ==
Beth meets with Emma Monaghan, a vampire who had sired the man she fell in love with so they could be together forever. Beth is surprised when she learns that Emma and her husband Jackson are still together after 150 years. Emma kills Dominiq, a basketball player with ties to Josef Kostan (Jason Dohring) and several other vampires. She is imprisoned, but she threatens to name every vampire in Los Angeles unless Mick breaks her out. Mick and the other vampires team up and help her escape, but are forced to kill her and Jackson due to treason, as she had threatened to expose her fellow vampires. Talbot receives a list of names of all the vampires in the area, including Mick, from an unknown source. Beth tells Mick that she cannot continue to date Mick because of their vampire-human situation, Mick leaves but doesn't go farther than a few steps out the door before he comes running back in. Mick says that he loves her and they kiss.

== Reception ==
According to the Nielsen ratings system, "Sonata" was watched by 7.47 million viewers upon its original broadcast in the United States, making it the 41st most watched episode of the week. Jen Creer of TV Squad appreciated that the finale provided closure, while still "keeping things open in case it was continued". She praised the character of Logan, and enjoyed the lines written by the writers. Creer said that she would have preferred Mick and Beth staying apart, but felt that because of the series' cancellation, the reunion was a better ending. John Kubicek of BuddyTV noted the "brilliant homage" with the mention of Hearst College in Veronica Mars, of which Dohring was a regular cast member. Kubicek thought that he would miss Logan most, and hoped that he would see David Blue on another television series.

== Series cancellation ==
Les Moonves, President of CBS, stated on December 4, 2007 that Moonlight was likely to return for a second season. Due to the Writers' strike, production of the series was halted by December 19, 2007, and only twelve episodes of the original thirteen-episode order were produced. Once the Writers' Strike ended, CBS announced that Moonlight would return April 25, 2008 with four new episodes, to be part of the series' first season. On May 13, 2008, CBS announced that Moonlight was officially canceled. Following the CBS cancellation, Warner Bros. Television inquired with other outlets about their interest in the series. One of the outlets approached was Media Rights Capital, which is responsible for The CW's Sunday night programming, although it decided not to acquire the series. It was later reported that the Sci Fi Channel was considering picking up the series. Writer and executive producer Harry Werksman said that "talks" were under way for a second season, and noted the possibility of a film. On June 23, 2008, James Hibberd of The Hollywood Reporter reported that efforts to sell Moonlight to another network had failed, and that the series was permanently canceled.
