= Out of the Past (disambiguation) =

Out of the Past is a 1947 American film noir.

Out of the Past may also refer to:

== Film ==
- Out of the Past (1927 film), an American silent drama film
- Out of the Past (1933 film), a British crime film
- Out of the Past (1998 film), an American LGBTQ documentary

== Television episodes ==
- "Out of the Past" (Agents of S.H.I.E.L.D.), 2020
- "Out of the Past" (Altered Carbon), 2018
- "Out of the Past" (Batman Beyond), 2000
- "Out of the Past" (The Legend of Korra), 2012
- "Out of the Past" (Moonlight), 2007
- "Out of the Past" (Roseanne), 1996
- "Out of the Past" (X-Men), 1994
