= No Such Thing =

No Such Thing may refer to:

- "No Such Thing" (Chris Cornell song), a 2007 single
- No Such Thing (film), a 2001 film by Hal Hartley
- "No Such Thing" (John Mayer song), a 2001 single
- "No Such Thing", a song by Dwight Yoakam from Population Me, 2003
- "There's No Such Thing As A Jaggy Snake"
- "No Such Thing as Vampires", the pilot episode of the TV series Moonlight
- There's No Such Thing as Vampires, a 2020 horror film

== See also ==
- There's no such thing as a free lunch or TINSTAAFL
