= Gabrielle Stanton =

American television writer and producer

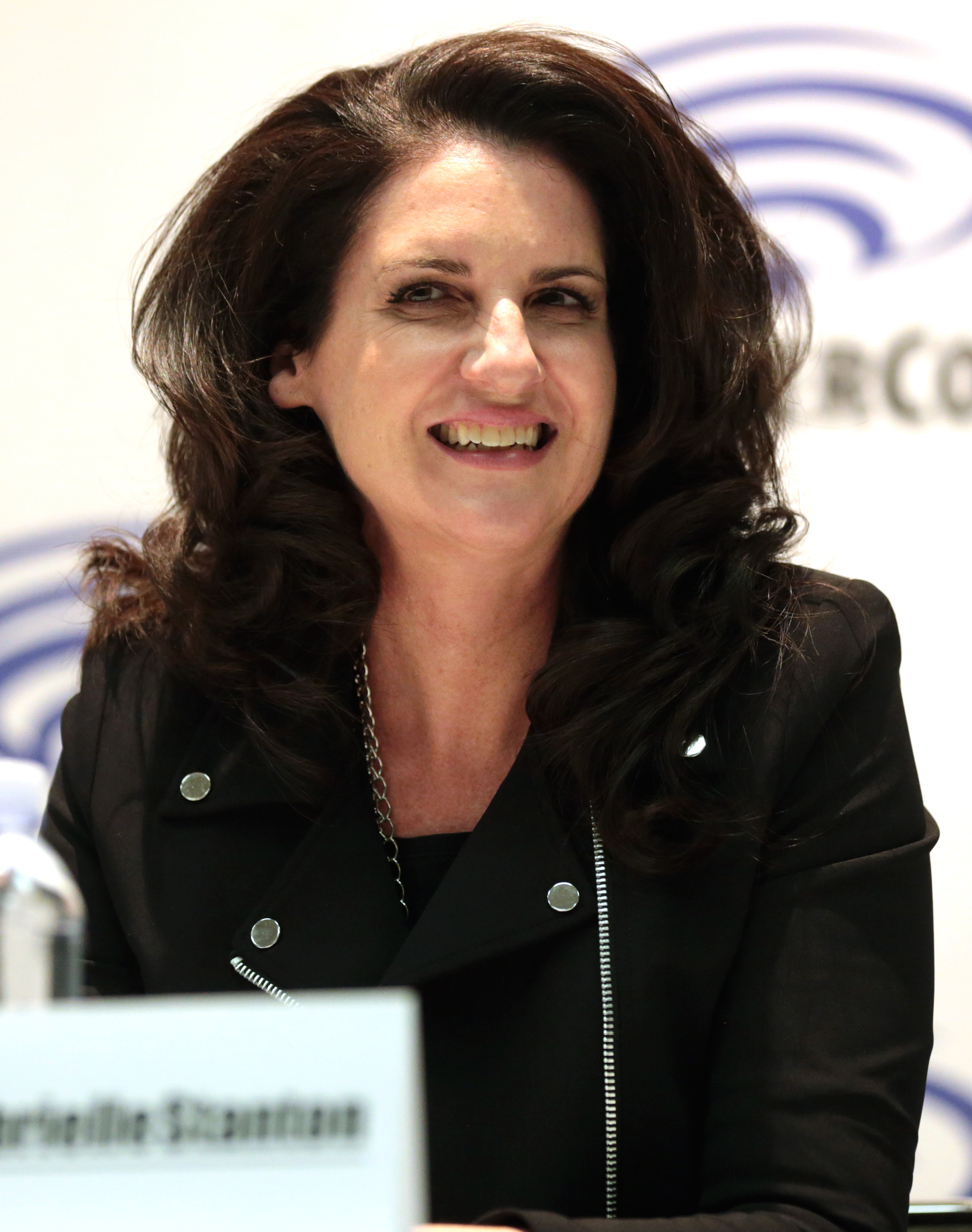
- Born: South Orange, New Jersey
- Education: Barnard College
- Occupations: Television producer, screenwriter
- Spouse: Harry Werksman (divorced)
- Writing career
- Notable works: Grey's Anatomy, Ugly Betty, Haven, The Vampire Diaries, The Flash, The Summer I Turned Pretty

Gabrielle Gail Stanton (born in South Orange, New Jersey) is an American television writer and producer. She is known for her work on the ABC series Grey's Anatomy and Ugly Betty, for The CW's The Flash, and for Syfy's Stephen King adaptation series Haven.

== Life and career ==
After attending the all-girls Kent Place School in Summit, New Jersey and graduating from the women's Barnard College and Columbia University in Manhattan, New York, Stanton worked as the national publicity coordinator in the New York office of the Public Broadcasting Service until 1991. In 1992 she made her way into the film industry as the assistant to writer-producer George Zaloom on the film Encino Man and later appeared in the 1998 film Free Enterprise in a minor role as the character "Gabrielle", while her then husband and writing partner Harry Werksman also appeared in the film as "Harry". She also worked on the movie Edward Scissorhands. It was also in 1998 that she broke into television. Her first job was on Star Trek: Deep Space Nine, which she followed with writing positions on V.I.P. and the science fiction series Earth: Final Conflict, Farscape, The Invisible Man and Veritas: The Quest, in the latter two of which she also served as co-producer. She wrote the teleplay for the made-for-television movie Deathlands before she was hired as a writer and producer for the medical drama series Grey's Anatomy, for which she made her debut with the 2005 episodes "Who's Zoomin' Who" and "Much Too Much". Her work on Grey's Anatomy earned her a shared Primetime Emmy Award nomination with the other production crew members in the Outstanding Drama Series category and one Writers Guild of America Award and two nominations; nominations in 2006 and 2007 for Dramatic Series, and a win in 2006 in the New Series category. She moved from Grey's Anatomy to the dramedy series Ugly Betty in 2007, writing the episode "Petra-Gate" and serving as a supervising producer for eight other episodes. She and the other Ugly Betty producers were nominated in 2007 for a Primetime Emmy Award in the Outstanding Comedy Series category.

Stanton also worked on the CBS television series Moonlight, for which she wrote three episodes and served as first co-executive producer, then executive producer. Upon its cancellation in May 2008, she served as co-executive producer on the ABC series Castle, then as consulting producer on The CW's The Vampire Diaries. Stanton was a co-executive producer on the ABC series The Gates.

She served as showrunner for the Syfy series Haven over its five-season run. She then joined the writing team of The CW superhero drama The Flash, where she also served as consulting producer for the last five episode of the first season. She co-wrote the teleplay for the season finale, along with showrunner Andrew Kreisberg, "Fast Enough". Entering its sophomore year. Stanton was promoted to co-showrunner/executive producer; co-writing the teleplay, again with Kreisberg, for the premiere, "The Man Who Saved Central City". Next she co-penned the pivotal sixth episode, "Enter Zoom", with story editor Brooke Eikmeier. At the conclusion of 2015, Stanton departed the series for uncited reasons. Prior to joining Flash, Stanton had written a first-season episode of its parent-series Arrow, "Trust But Verify".

== Personal life ==
Stanton and her former husband Harry Werksman announced their wedding plans in April 1991 and married in July 1991 in the chapel of New College at the University of Oxford, where Werksman had just received his master of letters degree in English history in June. They divorced in 2008. Her father is James Stanton, a lawyer, and she has a sister named Lexie.
