= David Blue =

David Blue may refer to:

- David Blue (musician) (1941–1982), American singer-songwriter and actor
- David Blue (actor) (born 1982), American actor, writer, producer and director
- David Blu (born 1980), American-Israeli professional basketball player
