= Winning a Battle, Losing the War =

Winning a Battle, Losing the War may refer to:

- "Winning the battle but losing the war", a concept related to a Pyrrhic victory
- "Winning a Battle, Losing the War" (Grey's Anatomy), an episode of the US television medical drama Grey's Anatomy
- "Winning a Battle, Losing the War" (song), a song by Kings of Convenience
