= David Blue (actor) =

American actor

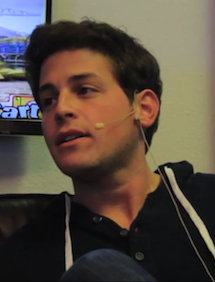
- David Blue in 2013
- Occupation: Actor
- Years active: 2002–present

David Blue is an American actor. He is known for his portrayal of Cliff St. Paul on Ugly Betty, Eli Wallace on the Syfy series Stargate Universe, and Rick Twitler on both Nickelodeon's Henry Danger and Danger Force.

== Early life ==
Blue grew up in Florida. He attended Countryside High School in Clearwater, Florida, and graduated from the University of Central Florida in Orlando with a Bachelor of Fine Arts in Acting and Musical Theatre Performance.

== Career ==
His first starring role came in the film Winter Follies, directed by Darren Lynn Bousman who also helmed Saw II, Saw III, and Saw IV.

Blue was one of the eight selected for the Apprentice program at the Actors Theatre of Louisville, where he worked with many artists, such as Jennifer Hubbard and Sullivan Canaday White. He was also later granted a scholarship to the British Academy of Dramatic Arts but his career prevented him from accepting straight away. He has training in many different acting styles including Method, Meisner, Viewpoints, and Suzuki. David has also had extensive improvisation training and comedy experience.

Blue performed in the premiere workshop production of Ain't No Mountain High Enough at the Mark Taper Forum. The musical was based on the works of Motown creator Berry Gordy and directed by Kenny Leon who had previously directed Sean Combs in the Broadway production of A Raisin in the Sun. The musical co-starred such TV/Film/Theatre talent as Cleavant Derricks and Ellis Williams.

On Ugly Betty, Blue starred as Cliff St. Paul, a photographer at Mode magazine and love interest to Wilhelmina Slater's faithful assistant, Marc St. James, played by Michael Urie. Before his breakthrough role on Ugly Betty, David made guest appearances on Veronica Mars, FX's series Dirt, and Disney's comedy The Suite Life of Zack & Cody. Blue received a large following on CBS's Moonlight as Logan Griffen, a technology-obsessed vampire recluse who often assists Mick St. John, played by Alex O'Loughlin. CBS chose to not renew Moonlight after its first season. One of Blue's feature film appearances was in The Comebacks, a comedy spoof on inspirational sports movies starring David Koechner, Matthew Lawrence, and Bradley Cooper.

Blue was part of the one-night celebrity staging of Howard Ashman's unproduced musical Dreamstuff. The musical was re-imagined by Howard's partners Marsha Malamet and Dennis Green and performed one night only at Los Angeles' Hayworth Theatre as part of the Bruno Kirby celebrity reading series, directed by his Ugly Betty co-star Michael Urie. David starred in the show alongside Eden Espinosa, Fred Willard, Vicki Lewis, and Luke Macfarlane.

Blue was one of the leads on Syfy's Stargate Universe. Starring opposite Robert Carlyle, David played the role of Eli Wallace.

Blue had a podcast channel called Out of the Blue where he interviews famous actors such as Torri Higginson, Claudia Black, Robert Picardo and Chase Masterson can be accessed on his Patreon page.

== Filmography ==
=== Film ===
| Year | Title | Role | Notes |
|---|---|---|---|
| 2004 | Dark Reality | Carey's boyfriend | Deleted scenes |
| 2007 | The Comebacks | LaCrosse partygoer | |
| 2012 | White Room: O2B3 | Six | Short film |
| 2012 | Divorce Invitation | Rick | |
| 2013 | The Ownership of the Ring | Frodo / Bounder (voice) | Short film |
| 2015 | Wrestling Isn't Wrestling | Theater audience member | Short film |
| 2015 | Shevenge | Brad | Short film |
| 2016 | Injection | Martin Fischer | Short film |
| 2016 | Dance Night Obsession | Tony | |
| 2017 | The Concessionaires Must Die! | Scott Frakes | |
| 2018 | The Competition | Jacob Hatcher | |
| 2018 | Lear's Shadow | Stephen | |
| 2020 | Atypical Wednesday | Sam | |

=== Television and video games ===
| Year | Title | Role | Notes |
|---|---|---|---|
| 2002 | Judas: Traitor or Friend? | Re-creation actor | Television film |
| 2002 | Scrubs | Medical intern | Episode: "My Lucky Day" |
| 2004 | UFO Files | Re-creation actor | Episode: "UFOs in the Bible" |
| 2004 | World of Warcraft | Blade Lord Ta'yak / General Pa'valak (voice) | Video game |
| 2006 | Veronica Mars | Beefy Resident | Episode: "Spit & Eggs" |
| 2006 | The Suite Life of Zack & Cody | Dr. Chip Walters | Episode: "Nurse Zack" |
| 2007–08 | Ugly Betty | Cliff St. Paul | Recurring role (7 episodes) |
| 2007 | Dirt | Toby | Episode: "The Thing Under the Bed" |
| 2007 | The Game | Waiter | Episode: "Diary of a Mad Black Woman, Redux" |
| 2008 | Moonlight | Logan Griffen | 5 episodes |
| 2008 | This Can't Be My Life | Stage Manager | Episode: "The Pink Pages" |
| 2009–2011 | Stargate Universe | Eli Wallace | 40 episodes |
| 2009–2011 | Stargate Universe Kino | Eli Wallace | 18 episodes |
| 2012 | World of Warcraft: Mists of Pandaria | Blade Lord Tayak / General Pav'alak (voice) | Video game |
| 2013–2015 | EastSiders | David | Recurring role (4 1/2 episodes) |
| 2013 | Rizzoli & Isles | Peter Kaufman | Episode: "Partners in Crime" |
| 2013 | Castle | Kyle | Episode: "A Murder Is Forever" |
| 2014 | Breadwinners | Nibbles (voice) | Episode: "The Brave and the Mold" |
| 2014 | Shelf Life | New boyfriend (voice) | Episode: "Retooned" |
| 2014 | Sunset Overdrive | Sam / Comic Book Store Announcer / Fargarth #2 (voice) | Video game |
| 2015 | Suspense | Dr. John Holden | Episode: "Casting the Runes" |
| 2016 | Stalking LeVar | Mason Grey | 3 episodes |
| 2017 | Totally Megan | Ryan | Episode: "Crush" |
| 2017 | 12 Days of Giving | Baxter Billings | Television film |
| 2017 | Sunset Glory: Doolittle's Heroes | C-46 Pilot Jefferson | Episode: "Goldenrod" |
| 2018 | Orbital Redux | Sebastian | Episode: "Autoreply" |
| 2019–2020 | Henry Danger | Rick Twitler | 4 episodes |
| 2019–2020 | The Game of Rassilon | Captain Gregg Kinnear | 5 episodes |
| 2019–2020 | (home)Schooled | Tom | 1 episode |
| 2022 | NCIS | Charlie Samuels | Episode: "Turkey Trot" |
| 2021–23 | Danger Force | Rick Twitler | 5 episodes |
