= Moonlight (American TV series) =

American television series (2007–2008)

- Genre: Fantasy drama Crime drama Thriller; Supernational
- Created by: Ron Koslow; Trevor Munson
- Starring: Alex O'Loughlin; Sophia Myles; Jason Dohring; Shannyn Sossamon
- Narrated by: Alex O'Loughlin
- Composers: Trevor Morris; John Frizzell
- Country of origin: United States
- No. of seasons: 1
- No. of episodes: 16

Production
- Executive producers: Ron Koslow; Trevor Munson; Gerard Bocaccio; Joel Silver; Rod Holcomb; Chip Johannessen; Gabrielle Stanton; Harry Werksman; David Barrett; David Greenwalt
- Running time: 42 minutes
- Production companies: Warner Bros. Television; Silver Pictures Television

Original release
- Network: CBS
- Release: September 28, 2007 – May 16, 2008

Moonlight is an American paranormal romance television drama created by Ron Koslow and Trevor Munson, who was also executive producer for all episodes with Joel Silver, Gerard Bocaccio, Gabrielle Stanton and Harry Werksman. The series follows private investigator Mick St. John (Alex O'Loughlin), who was turned into a vampire by his bride Coraline (Shannyn Sossamon) on the couple's wedding night fifty-five years earlier. In the present day, he struggles with his attraction to a mortal woman, Beth Turner (Sophia Myles), his friendship with his mentor and fellow vampire Josef Kostan (Jason Dohring), and his dealings with other vampires in Los Angeles.

The series was commissioned by Warner Bros. Television in 2007 as a presentation lasting 14–20 minutes. Alex O'Loughlin, Shannon Lucio, Rade Šerbedžija and Amber Valletta were cast in the lead roles, and Rod Holcomb was hired as director. David Greenwalt joined the staff in May 2007 as showrunner and executive producer with Joel Silver; however, health reasons forced Greenwalt to leave the series. All of the original actors, apart from the male lead role, were recast in June 2007 with Sophia Myles, Jason Dohring and Shannyn Sossamon. A retooled, full-length pilot for television audiences was then shot.

Moonlight premiered on September 28, 2007, and was shown on Friday nights on CBS. Although it was received poorly by critics, the pilot finished first among total viewers and adults aged 18–49 for its night. The series received generally negative reviews, and averaged 7.57 million American viewers per episode. Many critics criticized the acting and the writing; however, Jason Dohring's performance was praised. Moonlight went on hiatus due to the 2007–2008 Writers Guild of America strike, but returned with four new episodes once the strike ended. On May 13, 2008, CBS announced that Moonlight was officially canceled.

== Plot ==
The pilot introduces Mick St. John, a private investigator who has been a vampire for over fifty years. He meets Beth Turner, a reporter for the online newspaper BuzzWire, at the scene of the murder of a young woman. Mick and Beth begin investigating the crime together, helping each other to catch the killer. Flashbacks to 22 years ago show a domestic fight between Mick and his ex-wife Coraline Duvall over a kidnapped girl. Mick sets fire to the house and rescues the girl, leaving Coraline to the fire. It is revealed that the little girl has grown up to be Beth, and that Mick has tried to watch over her and keep her safe over the years. In the present, Beth discovers that Mick is a vampire, and Mick reveals how one becomes a vampire and tells her the story of how he was turned by his bride, Coraline, on their wedding night.

Beth asks Mick to help her friend Morgan find her stolen cameras. When he meets her, Mick is completely shocked; Morgan is identical to his ex-wife, Coraline. He becomes even more confused when his vampiric sense of smell tells him that Morgan is human. Mick tries to expose Morgan as Coraline, but finally comes to believe that she is a doppelgänger when he sees that she does not have the fleur de lis tattoo on her shoulder as Coraline did. When alone, Morgan scrubs away the heavy makeup that has been covering the tattoo. Beth snoops through Mick's property, and finds out Mick was the one who protected her as a little girl when she was kidnapped. Morgan goes with Mick to his apartment to clean up after almost getting hit by a car. Mick joins her in the shower and finally sees the tattoo on her shoulder, revealing her identity as Coraline. When Beth learns that Morgan is really Coraline, the lady who kidnapped her as a child, she goes to Mick's apartment and stabs her with a wooden stake, narrowly missing her heart, not realizing that she has become human. Coraline goes to hospital, but recovers and leaves after being revealed to be a vampire again. Beth's boyfriend Josh is kidnapped by a dangerous Los Angeles–based gang. Mick and Beth witness the event and drive after him, but Josh is shot. Beth realizes that Josh is dying, and begs Mick to turn him into a vampire; he refuses and Josh dies. While putting Josh's affairs in order, Beth discovers that Josh was about to propose to her.

Mick encounters two vampires who are looking for Coraline. Once they leave, Mick visits his vampire friend Josef, who tells him that one of them was Lance (Jason Butler Harner), a rich and powerful vampire. Mick finds Coraline at a storage facility working on a compound for the vampire cure. Coraline explains that during the French Revolution there were seven siblings of royal blood who were vampires, two of whom were Lance and Coraline. She then uses the compound to cure Mick's vampirism, although Lance arrives and takes her away. Mick enjoys life as a human, although the cure is only temporary. Beth's boss at BuzzWire is killed, and a new assistant district attorney named Benjamin Talbot (Eric Winter) investigates the murder. Mick and Beth discuss the problems of having a romantic relationship, and although they end up kissing, Mick tells her he needs time to figure things out. Photos of Mick getting hit by a vehicle find their way into the hands of Talbot. Mick and Beth decide to start a romantic relationship, and go to a restaurant for their first date. When Beth quits her job at BuzzWire and becomes unemployed, Talbot offers her a job as a civilian investigator. Talbot receives a list of names of all the vampires in the area, including Mick, from an unknown source. Beth tells Mick that she cannot continue to date him because of their vampire-human situation, but Mick says that he loves her and they kiss.

=== Vampire mythology ===
The conventions of Moonlight are based, in part, on a unique mythology. Some parts of the mythology that are common include a sire, that is the vampire who turns a human into a vampire; though in the show the sire must teach him or her how to live as one. A vampire's bite is not enough to turn a human into a vampire; the human, when near death, must drink the sire's blood or have vampire blood in his or her system at the moment of death. The process of vampirization also affects their genetics, causing their DNA to be fundamentally altered to suit their bodies' new state. This makes genetic testing between vampires and their human relatives impossible unless the vampire has a sample of their own human DNA from before they were turned, such as a lock of hair. They must consume human blood to survive. They also develop psychic powers and can glimpse the future and the past. This ability, along with their night vision, is an extension of their heightened senses. Daylight does not kill vampires, but does make them progressively weaker. Silver and fire are toxic, whereas garlic, holy water and crucifixes are benign. A vampire's image cannot be captured with analogue cameras containing silver emulsion in the film; digital cameras are able to capture an image because they do not use silver emulsion. Though undead, vampires have a pulse, are not cold-blooded (but still don't produce body heat as seen in episode 11 so that heat signature cameras won't see them), and cannot turn into a bat. The only ways to kill them are by decapitation or burning; a stake through the heart is painful but only causes paralysis. Moonlight vampires have many of the preternatural abilities described in vampire mythology; they have superhuman strength and speed, they heal rapidly from any wound, they can defy gravity to a limited degree to perform parkour feats, their bite has hypnotic effects on weak-minded humans, and they are immortal. Their powers increase as they get older. Their blood has drug-like effects when consumed by humans; causing euphoria and temporarily heightened senses.

== Episodes ==
No.	Title	Directed by	Written by	Original release date	US viewers (millions)
1	"No Such Thing as Vampires"	Rod Holcomb	Ron Koslow & Trevor Munson	September 28, 2007	8.54
At the crime scene of a murdered college student, vampire P.I. Mick St. John meets Beth Turner, a reporter for the online newspaper BuzzWire. Although two puncture wounds to the neck make it appear that the girl was killed by vampires, Mick knows that this was not the case; his vampiric sense of smell does not pick up any scent of vampires. Mick and Beth find the girl's professor, a self-proclaimed vampire who uses his knowledge of vampire lore to seduce female college students. Beth goes undercover to see what she can find out about the professor, but is kidnapped by the professor's assistant. Mick comes to her rescue, using his vampire strength to overcome him. It is revealed that Mick has met Beth before; he saved her when she was a child from his ex-wife Coraline.
2	"Out of the Past"	Fred Toye	David Greenwalt	October 5, 2007	8.04
Mick becomes furious when convicted killer Lee Jay Spalding is released from prison; Spalding had previously killed a woman Mick was supposed to protect. Mick is concerned that Spalding is not the reformed man he pretends to be. Spalding knows Mick is a vampire, and while incarcerated, has been planning to kill him. Beth's friend Julia writes a book about Spalding, portraying him as a great man, but Spalding kidnaps Julia and tells Mick that if he does not turn himself into the police, he will kill her. Mick rescues Julia, but is shot in the process by silver bullets. Beth arrives and sees Spalding about to kill Mick, who is helpless on the ground, and shoots him instead. Due to his own gunshot wounds, Mick begins to lose his energy and rushes home to feed on some blood. While feeding, Beth arrives at Mick's house and sees him with his fangs out and blood all over his face.
3	"Dr. Feelgood"	Scott Lautanen	Gabrielle Stanton & Harry Werksman	October 12, 2007	7.10
While Beth struggles to cope with the discovery that Mick is a vampire, the two work together to find a killer who is a newly turned vampire. As they race to find him, they encounter his sire, the vampire who turned him, but who did not train him how to understand or handle his urges. Mick reveals to Beth how one becomes a vampire and tells her the story of how he was turned on his wedding night by his ex-wife, Coraline. He also tells her that he trusts her.
4	"Fever"	Fred Toye	Jill Blotevogel	October 19, 2007	7.67
Beth's boyfriend Josh is prosecuting powerful arms dealer Amir Fayed for murder, but because of a leak in his department, Josh's star witness, Leni Hayes, is in serious danger. Leni is placed in a safe house, but when Fayed's hitman arrives, she is forced to flee to the Mojave Desert. Mick is called to protect Leni, who finds her just before the hitman catches her. The pair get stranded in the desert, where the blazing sun takes its toll on Mick, who grows progressively weaker. They find shelter in an abandoned motel, and Mick persuades Leni to call Beth. Realizing that Mick has experienced a prolonged exposure to sunlight and is near death, Beth rushes to his side and, overcoming her fear, allows him to feed off her just long enough to restore his life force. Leni returns to testify, and Fayed is convicted.
5	"Arrested Development"	Michael Fields	Chip Johannessen	October 26, 2007	8.39
After being forced to feed on Beth's blood, Mick tries to avoid her. To keep busy, Mick takes a case to find a young woman, while Beth works on a story about a possible serial killer who has relocated to Los Angeles. Despite the initial awkwardness, the two agree to work together when they realize that the serial killer's next target is the young woman Mick is searching for. The killer turns out to be a teenage vampire who claims to be 200 years old, trapped forever as appearing too young, who has channeled his rage into killing prostitutes. Beth and Mick are able to save the young woman just before the vampire murders her, who is able to escape. After a struggle between Mick and the killer in a carnival, the latter is killed by a passing rollercoaster. Later, when Beth encounters Mick, they kiss.
6	"B.C."	Paul Holahan	Erin Maher & Kathryn Reindl	November 2, 2007	7.55
Josef asks Mick to find Lola, a vampire with whom he has had an on-again, off-again relationship for 100 years. Meanwhile, Beth is doing a story on a model who died of a drug overdose during a photo shoot. Both investigations lead to the morgue, where Beth and Mick realize their cases are related. They end up working together when Josef's lover turns out to be a "drug" dealer, killing other vampires and selling their blood to humans as a drug. The vampire blood makes a human feel almost like a vampire; powerful and sexy, but it can easily lead to fatal overdose. Curious, Beth tries the drug and, under its influence, tries to seduce Mick, although he resists her. When Beth learns that Josh and the police are about to raid the warehouse where Lola makes the drug, she tips Mick off and he manages to blow up Lola and her operation before the police arrive.
7	"The Ringer"	Chris Fisher	Josh Pate	November 9, 2007	7.90
Beth asks Mick to help her photographer friend Morgan find her stolen cameras. When he meets her, Mick is completely shocked; Morgan is identical to his ex-wife and sire, Coraline. He becomes even more confused when his vampiric sense of smell tells him that Morgan is human, but the photographs Morgan took replicate the way in which Mick killed Coraline. As he investigates, Mick attempts to discover whether Morgan really is Coraline, and how she might have "cured" herself. Although Beth is reluctant to admit it, she gets a little jealous over Mick's fascination with Morgan. Mick tries to expose Morgan as Coraline, but finally comes to believe that Morgan is a doppelgänger when he sees that she does not have the fleur de lis tattoo on her shoulder as Coraline did. When alone, Morgan scrubs away the heavy makeup that has been covering her shoulder tattoo: a fleur de lis.
8	"12:04 AM"	Dennis Smith	Jill Blotevogel	November 16, 2007	8.16
Beth helps a girl named Audrey whose parents were murdered by a cult leader named Donovan Shepherd. Beth relates to Audrey as she recalls her own posttraumatic stress disorder from her own kidnapping, and realizes that the police never caught the woman who took her. After Shepherd is executed, Audrey gets a threatening phone call from him and catches a glimpse of him through Beth's apartment's window. Mick finds out that Shepherd was turned into a vampire by his priest just before his execution, and manages to kill him before he captures Audrey. While snooping through Mick's property, Beth finds out that he was the one who protected her as a little girl when she was kidnapped. She finds pictures of herself in a file at his home.
9	"Fleur de Lis"	James Whitmore, Jr.	Gabrielle Stanton & Harry Werksman	November 23, 2007	7.32
When Mick works closely on a case with Morgan, Beth grows jealous and decides to research Morgan's background. While working one the case together, Morgan drops constant hints to Mick about her real identity. While working on the case, they share a kiss and Morgan later tells Mick that she is perfect for him, not Beth. After Mick saves her life from a speeding car, Morgan goes with Mick to his apartment to clean up. Mick joins her in the shower and finally sees the tattoo on her shoulder, revealing her identity as Coraline. When Beth learns that Morgan is really Coraline, and the lady who kidnapped her when she was a little girl, she goes to Mick's apartment and stabs her through the heart with a wooden stake, not realizing that she has somehow become human again. Beth is the one narrating this episode instead of Mick.
10	"Sleeping Beauty"	John Kretchmer	Ron Koslow & Trevor Munson	December 14, 2007	7.57
A dying wealthy man hires a hitman to kill Josef to avenge his daughter's supposed murder 55 years ago. Mick investigates the attempt on Josef's life and suspects that the hitman knows about Josef being a vampire. Beth does her own investigating for BuzzWire, and helps Mick find the hitman's identity. The twin investigations lead Mick and Beth to New York City, where they discover that the dying man's daughter is still alive but in a comatose state, yet has somehow not aged since the day of her disappearance. Josef reveals that they had fallen in love 55 years ago and his attempt to turn her into a vampire caused her to go into a coma. When the hitman arrives and again attempts to kill Josef, Mick grabs the hitman and kills him. Meanwhile, Coraline recovers and leaves the hospital after being revealed to be a vampire again.
11	"Love Lasts Forever"	Paul Holahan	Josh Pate	January 11, 2008	8.32
Mick is enlisted by Josh to protect Beth when she is threatened by the MS-13, a dangerous Los Angeles-based gang. Beth insists that Josh, who has been working on convicting a member of the gang, should not drop the case, so he arranges police protection for her. When Josh leaves her building alone, he is kidnapped by the gang and driven away. Mick and Beth witness the event and chase after him. When they finally catch up, Mick attacks the kidnappers, but one manages to shoot Josh. Beth realizes that Josh is dying, and begs Mick to turn him into a vampire. Mick refuses, and Josh dies. Beth becomes engulfed in grief and storms off, leaving Mick behind.
12	"The Mortal Cure"	Eric Laneuville	Chip Johannessen	January 18, 2008	8.17
While putting Josh's affairs in order, Beth discovers evidence leading her to believe Josh was cheating on her. When she investigates, Beth learns that Josh was about to propose to her, and that the woman she thought he was cheating with was actually a jeweler. Mick encounters two vampires at his house who ask him to help them find Coraline. Mick asks Josef who they were, and Josef tells him that one of them was Lance, a rich and powerful vampire. Mick finds her at a storage facility working with a scientist on a compound for the vampire cure, and Mick discovers that Coraline is a vampire again. Coraline finally explains that during the French Revolution there were seven siblings of royal blood who were vampires, two of which were Lance and Coraline. She then uses the compound to cure Mick's vampirism, but Lance arrives and, angry that she took the compound and put Mick into their bloodline without their consent 50 years ago, he takes her away to be punished.
13	"Fated To Pretend"	David Barrett	Gabrielle Stanton & Harry Werksman	April 25, 2008	7.93
Mick is enjoying life as a human, although he reveals the cure is only temporary. Beth's BuzzWire boss Maureen is killed after telling Beth she had an interesting story to pursue, and a new assistant district attorney named Benjamin Talbot investigates the murder. Beth and Mick launch their own investigation, which Talbot warns could taint any evidence and let Maureen's killer walk free. During an interview, Maureen's murderer, a vampire, kidnaps Beth and Talbot. Knowing he is helpless as a human, Mick asks Josef to turn him back into a vampire. Mick and Josef go after the vampire, and manage to save Beth and Talbot without the latter realizing what really happened. Afterwards, Mick and Beth discuss the problems of having a romantic relationship, and although they end up kissing, Mick tells her he needs time to figure things out.
14	"Click"	Scott Lautanen	Erin Maher & Kathryn Reindl	May 2, 2008	7.89
Mick is hired as part of a security detail for Tierney Taylor (Peyton List), a famous actress who feels her life is threatened by aggressive paparazzi. Due to the death of Maureen, BuzzWire has a new boss, Grant Lewis, who tells the staff that he wants a scoop, regardless of its credibility. When Taylor is killed, Mick and Beth team up to find the killer, suspecting Dean Foster, a photographer who was obsessed with Taylor. When Mick is hit by a vehicle, Beth receives an email from Foster, containing photos from the incident. Beth goes to Josef for help, and although he manages to kill Foster before the photos are leaked, they find their way into the hands of Benjamin Talbot. Mick and Beth decide to start a romantic relationship, and go to a restaurant for their first date.
15	"What's Left Behind"	Chris Fisher	Jill Blotevogel	May 9, 2008	7.61
Mick and Beth investigate the kidnapping of a young boy named Jacob. When Mick learns that the boy was the grandson of his World War II buddy, with whose wife he had an affair, he realizes that he may be the boy's grandfather. The man responsible for the kidnapping, Ken Verdolino, stalks Beth and attempts to attack her. Mick goes to Verdolino's house and saves Jacob, but Verdolino commits suicide in the process. Talbot offers Beth a job as a civilian investigator, knowing she is unemployed after quitting Buzzwire. During the investigation, Mick contemplates the possibility of having a family and gathers a DNA sample to determine if he is Jacob's grandfather; he later tells Beth the results were negative.
16	"Sonata"	Fred Toye	Ethan Erwin	May 16, 2008	7.47
Beth meets with Emma Monaghan, a vampire who had sired the man she fell in love with so they could be together forever. Beth is surprised when she learns that Emma and her husband Jackson are still together after 150 years. Emma kills Dominic, a basketball player with ties to Josef and several other vampires. She is imprisoned, but she threatens to name every vampire in Los Angeles unless Mick breaks her out. Mick and the other vampires team up and help her escape, but are forced to kill her and Jackson due to treason, as she had threatened to expose her fellow vampires. Talbot receives a list of names of all the vampires in the area, including Mick, from an unknown source. Beth tells Mick that she cannot continue to date Mick because of their vampire-human situation, but Mick says that he loves her and they kiss.

== Cast and characters ==
After re-casting, the main stars of Moonlight were (left to right): Jason Dohring as Josef Kostan, Shannyn Sossamon as Coraline Duvall, Alex O'Loughlin as Mick St. John, and Sophia Myles as Beth Turner.

=== Main ===
- Alex O'Loughlin portrays Mick St. John, a private investigator who was turned into a vampire on the night of their wedding by his bride, Coraline. Mick is 85 years old; unlike other vampires, he has standards and does not hunt women, children, or innocents. Although he realizes that he has feelings for Beth, he is reluctant to continue a romantic relationship with her, knowing that being a vampire would hinder any sort of normal life. He is shown to be unusually mature and physically strong for a vampire of his age.
- Sophia Myles portrays Beth Turner, an internet reporter and Mick's love interest. Beth has some memories of being rescued from a kidnapper by Mick 22 years previously, but does not initially realize that Mick is the same man. At the beginning of the series, she is dating an assistant district attorney, Josh Lindsey (Jordan Belfi), but later develops a romantic relationship with Mick, whom she begins dating after Lindsey's death.
- Jason Dohring portrays Josef Kostan, a 410-year-old vampire and Mick's mentor and friend. Josef is a businessman who indulges himself with luxuries, from an expensive house to the company of numerous beautiful women who are more than happy to sate his desire for blood. Josef is Mick's second sire, ending the latter's brief stint as a human.
- Shannyn Sossamon portrays Coraline Duvall, St. John's ex-wife and original sire. A courtesan in early 18th century France, she is approximately 340 years old. After turning Mick into a vampire, the couple became estranged and Coraline was presumed dead for more than twenty years. When she returns under the pseudonym Morgan, she appears to be completely human and claims to have a cure for vampirism, which Mick becomes desperate to obtain.

=== Supporting ===
- Jacob Vargas as Guillermo Gasol, a morgue worker who steals blood from dead bodies for himself and other vampires.
- Brian J. White as Lieutenant Carl Davis, one of Beth's contacts and a friend of Mick.
- Jordan Belfi as Josh Lindsey, Beth's boyfriend who works in the district attorney's office. Josh is killed by a member of the MS-13 gang.
- Tami Roman as Maureen Williams, Beth's boss at BuzzWire. Maureen is killed by a vampire over one of her stories.
- Kevin Weisman as Steve Balfour, a friend of Beth and co-worker at BuzzWire.
- David Blue as Logan Griffin, a vampire computer hacker and technology-obsessed recluse who Mick often goes to for help.
- Erika Ringor as Officer Theresa Novak, a police officer who sometimes gets involved with Mick and Beth's affairs.
- Eric Winter as Benjamin Talbot, an assistant district attorney who offers Beth a job.
- Nate Mooney as Ryder England, a vampire hacker employed by Josef Kostan who helps Mick and Beth find a vampire draining and killing escorts.

== Production ==
=== Conception and crew ===
Trevor Munson conceived the character of Mick Angel in 2004 and spent two and a half years writing a novel featuring the character. The story was adapted into a feature film script, and Bruce Willis was considered as a possibility for the lead role. The script was shown to Nina Tassler at CBS, who paired Munson with Ron Koslow, creator of Beauty and the Beast, to rewrite the script as a television series. The series was titled Twilight, and Koslow and Munson wrote the pilot, which Warner Bros. Television initially commissioned as a presentation lasting 14–20 minutes in January 2007. Joel Silver and Gerard Bocaccio were hired to be executive producers on the project under the former's production banner, Silver Pictures, in the same month. Alex O'Loughlin and Shannon Lucio were cast in the presentation, and Rod Holcomb was hired as director. The project was renamed Moonlight when picked up by CBS on May 14, 2007, prior to the upfronts. David Greenwalt, creator of Miracles and co-creator of Angel, joined the staff in May 2007 as showrunner and executive producer alongside Silver. CBS had hired Greenwalt during the pilot process to restructure the original concept by Koslow and Munson, but health reasons forced Greenwalt to leave the series, and Chip Johannessen took over showrunner duties in August 2007.

=== Casting ===
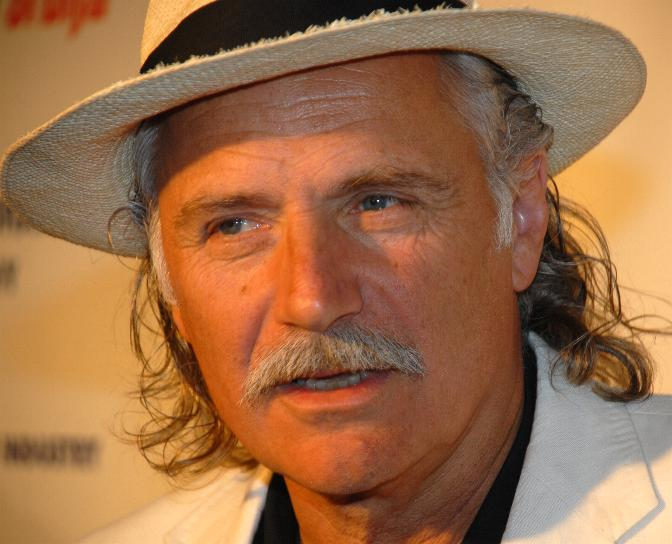
Rade Šerbedžija was originally cast to play Josef Kostan, but was replaced by Jason Dohring to make way for a younger cast.

During Greenwalt's restructuring of the pilot, all of the original actors save for the male lead role of Mick St. John were recast in June 2007: Shannon Lucio, Rade Šerbedžija and Amber Valletta were originally cast in the roles of Beth Turner, Josef Kostan and Coraline Duvall respectively before Sophia Myles, Jason Dohring and Shannyn Sossamon replaced them. With this almost entirely different cast, a retooled, full-length pilot for television audiences was re-shot. Joel Silver approached Dohring "out of the blue and said, 'There's a role, and I'm making it younger'". Dohring read two pages of script featuring Josef, and was interested by the character's "dark" and "sharp" personality. Dohring had to go through the normal audition process and was not sure he would have gotten the role without Silver, who had "pushed it all the way through to the end".

Munson explained that the goal of the casting changes was "to lighten the show up a bit". He believed the changes granted the studio and network's wish to "make it a little younger and hipper". O'Loughlin felt that the whole cast's becoming "a little bit younger" especially affected the character Josef, as the originally chosen actor, Šerbedžija, was twice Jason Dohring's age. The creators and the network were concerned that Josef, whose relationship with Mick was important, would appear as more of a "father figure" rather than as a friend. O'Loughlin supported the recasting of Josef with a younger actor due to the resulting "level of ease in that age difference".

=== Promotion and distribution ===
To promote the series, Silver and the main cast attended the Comic-Con International on July 27, 2007, where the series was featured. Moonlight premiered on September 28, 2007, airing on Friday nights at 9:00/8:00c on CBS, following Ghost Whisperer. Internationally, CTV began airing the series in Canada in simulcast with the American broadcast; Living began airing the series in the United Kingdom on February 19, 2008; and Nine Network in Australia began airing Moonlight on December 12, 2007, although it stopped showing the series after the eighth episode. The series finale aired on May 16, 2008, in the United States. The Sci Fi Channel began airing repeats of the series on January 23, 2009, on Fridays at 9 pm/ET. The series averaged one million viewers per episode on the Sci Fi Channel, making it one of the better-performing acquired series of the channel in recent years. Warner Home Video released the complete first season on DVD on January 20, 2009. On May 5, 2010, it was announced that reruns of the series would be paired with The Vampire Diaries repeats throughout the summer on The CW.

=== Cancellation ===
Les Moonves, President of CBS, stated on December 4, 2007, that Moonlight was likely to return for a second season. Due to the 2007–2008 Writers Guild of America strike, production of the series was halted by December 19, 2007, and only twelve episodes of the original thirteen-episode order were produced. Once the Writers' Strike ended, CBS announced that Moonlight would return on April 25, 2008, with four new episodes, to be part of the series' first season. On May 13, 2008, CBS announced that Moonlight was officially cancelled. Following the CBS cancellation, Warner Bros. Television inquired with other outlets about their interest in the series. One of the outlets approached was Media Rights Capital, which is responsible for The CW's Sunday night programming, although it decided not to acquire the series. It was later reported that Syfy was considering picking up the series. Writer and executive producer Harry Werksman said that "talks" were under way for a second season, and noted the possibility of a film. On June 23, 2008, James Hibberd of The Hollywood Reporter reported that efforts to sell Moonlight to another network had failed, and that the series was permanently cancelled.

== Broadcast syndication ==
Syfy acquired the rights to air the show. In summer 2010, The CW announced that it would air repeats of the show on Thursdays at 9:00 pm following The Vampire Diaries encores. The first episode aired on June 3 and attracted 1.41 million viewers and a 0.5 rating in adults aged 18–49. The repeat of the finale episode aired on August 26, 2010, and then the network removed it from the schedule.

== Reception ==
Moonlight attracted a loyal and devoted fan base which included internet communities. Fans Christine Contilli, Elizabeth McGinnis, and Barbara Arnold coordinated with the American Red Cross, CBS, and Warner Bros for a series of charity blood drives involving 33 states, and Alex O'Loughlin became a national spokesman for the charity. The series averaged 7.57 million American viewers per episode, ranking 89 out of 281 in the 2007–08 ratings. The pilot, "No Such Thing as Vampires", finished first among total viewers and adults aged 18–49 for its night, and was seen by 8.54 million American viewers. By comparison, the series finale, "Sonata", was watched by 7.47 million viewers upon its original broadcast, making it the 41st-most watched episode of the week. Moonlight was the 90th-most watched series of the 2007–2008 Television season with 7.53 million viewers.

=== Critical response ===
Reviews were generally negative for the pilot, and the early episodes. Metacritic gave the pilot a Metascore of 38 out of 100, signifying generally negative reviews. Tim Goodman of the San Francisco Chronicle considered the series to be "the worst new fall show". The writing was criticized as "ponderous", and having "familiar, conventional plots". The dialogue was described by Maureen Ryan of the Chicago Tribune as "groan-inducing". The acting of the pilot was criticized as "sub-par" and "woeful". Matthew Gilbert of The Boston Globe depreciated the chemistry between O'Loughlin and Myles as "artificial", and said that they "exchange lines of dialogue with a stilted rhythm and no natural flow". O'Loughlin was described as a "flatliner", and "passable in the lead role". Not all reviews, however, were as negative. Kara Howland of TV Guide gave the pilot a positive review, and thought it was a "solid start". Travis Fickett of IGN praised the actors, however, and felt that O'Loughlin did "a decent job", and that Myles was "perhaps the most promising aspect of the show". Ryan commended Myles as "reasonably good". Several critics praised Jason Dohring's portrayal of Josef. One said that he gave the series "a small burst of energy", while another said that he made it "crackle with a bit of wit". Dohring was described as "a welcome presence", and one critic wished for "a bit more screen time".

Reviews of the second episode were generally more positive than the pilot. Travis Fickett of IGN described the episode, and the series as a whole, as "vampire mediocrity with a slight hint of potential". He compared the episode to the television series Angel, saying it was "weaker on virtually every front". Jen Creer of TV Squad criticized the writing, but said she felt that Sophia Myles was doing a "decent job of developing her character and embracing the material". Carl Cortez of iFMagazine.com said this episode improved "leaps and bounds", and was a "step in the right direction". He gave the episode a 'C' rating, saying the direction was "lifeless" and the acting was "stilted". AOL TV placed the show in its list of TV's Biggest Guilty Pleasures. Rotten Tomatoes gives the series a critic rating of 22%.

=== Awards and nominations ===
- People's Choice Award for Favorite New TV Drama, 2008
- Saturn Award for Best Television Series Release on DVD, 2009 (awarded by the Academy of Science Fiction, Fantasy & Horror Films)

== See also ==
- Vampire film
- List of vampire television series
