= If Tomorrow Never Comes (Grey's Anatomy) =

- Grey's Anatomy episode
- Episode no.: Season 1 Episode 6
- Directed by: Scott Brazil
- Written by: Krista Vernoff
- Production code: 106
- Original air date: May 1, 2005

Guest appearances
- Alex Alexander as Annie Connors; Bruce Weitz as Mr. Levangie

Episode chronology
← Previous "Shake Your Groove Thing"	Next → "The Self-Destruct Button"
- Grey's Anatomy season 1

"If Tomorrow Never Comes" is the sixth episode of the first season of the American television medical drama Grey's Anatomy, which first aired on ABC on May 1, 2005. The episode was written by Krista Vernoff and was directed by Scott Brazil.

On its initial airing, the episode garnered an American audience of 18.54 million viewers and received mixed-to-positive reviews from television critics.

== Plot ==
The episode opens with a voice-over narration from Meredith Grey (Ellen Pompeo) about conquering fear, taking action, and valuing effort over regret.

The interns are left speechless when Annie Connors (played by Alex Alexander) arrives with a massive, record-breaking tumor, though her prognosis is grim. Derek Shepherd (Patrick Dempsey) and Meredith Grey (Ellen Pompeo) face potential risks to their jobs after Miranda Bailey (Chandra Wilson) discovers their relationship, making it clear that Derek should not give Meredith any special treatment. Meanwhile, Izzie Stevens (Katherine Heigl) encourages George O'Malley (T. R. Knight) to ask Meredith out, and the relationship between Cristina Yang (Sandra Oh) and Preston Burke (Isaiah Washington) continues to deepen.

== Production ==
This episode marked the first written by Krista Vernoff, who would later go on to become the showrunner of the series for several seasons. Vernoff revealed that in the original storyline, the woman with the tumor was supposed to survive. However, after writing the script, Vernoff decided that the character had to die. Since the episode's theme was procrastination, Vernoff explained, "The message I wanted to give was not, 'Hey, it’s okay to put off going to see a doctor for two years because it all turns out alright in the end.'"

== Release ==
"If Tomorrow Never Comes" debuted on Sunday, May 1, 2005, winning its time slot with 18.54 million viewers, an 8.5 average share, and achieving a record high for the show among young adult viewers. It ranked sixth overall among programs airing that week. Building on the strong ratings from the first five episodes, the show's renewal for a second season was announced shortly after.

== Reception ==
"If Tomorrow Never Comes" received mixed-to-positive reviews from television critics upon telecast. In 2006, the Ottawa Citizen described this early episode as "not among Grey's Anatomy's best, but the signs of future greatness are there". In 2009, Variety listed the tumor storyline from this episode as one of the 10 "most bizarre medical maladies" in the first 100 episodes of the series.
