= Malia Jones =

American model and surfer

- Born: March 27, 1977 (age 49); Loma Linda, California, United States
- Occupations: Model, surfer
- Spouse: Alex O'Loughlin (m. 2014)
- Children: 2

Malia Jones (born March 27, 1977) is an American model and surfer.

== Life and career ==
Jones was born in Loma Linda, California, and moved to Kailua, Hawaii, at the age of two. Jones is of Hawaiian-Filipino, German and English descent. She began to surf competitively in her early teens, and at age 15 won the girls' division of the United States Amateur Surfing Championship. Surfing Magazine spotted her while she was competing and asked her to model for their swimsuit issue, and thus a second career was born.

Since then, she has appeared on the cover of over a dozen magazines, and has been named one of the "50 Most Beautiful People" by People magazine, and one of America's "10 Sexiest Athletes" by Esquire. She has also been a Sports Illustrated swimsuit model. Jones has done TV commercials for American Express, Capri Sun, Coca-Cola, Corona Beer, and VO5 shampoo. Jones was also a consultant for the Disney movie Lilo & Stitch. She also designs a line of swimwear for Mambo Graphics sportswear.

She married surfer Conan Hayes in 1999 then divorced. In 2007, she married Australian professional surfer Luke Stedman. In 2009, she gave birth to the couple's son, Spike. Jones divided her time between Hawaii, France and Sydney, Australia.

Her son with actor Alex O'Loughlin, Lion, was born in 2012. Jones and O'Loughlin married in Hawaii on April 18, 2014. They and their three sons (O'Loughlin's son, O'Loughlin and Jones's son, and Jones's son from her previous marriage) live in Hawaii.
