= Grey's Anatomy season 1 =

Grey's Anatomy
- Season 1
- DVD cover art for the first season of Grey's Anatomy
- Showrunners: James Parriott; Shonda Rhimes
- Starring: Ellen Pompeo; Sandra Oh; Katherine Heigl; Justin Chambers; T. R. Knight; Chandra Wilson; James Pickens Jr.; Isaiah Washington; Patrick Dempsey
- No. of episodes: 9

Release
- Original network: ABC
- Original release: March 27 – May 22, 2005

Season chronology
- Next → Season 2

The first season of the American television medical drama Grey's Anatomy began airing in the United States on the American Broadcasting Company (ABC) channel on March 27, 2005, and concluded on May 22, 2005, and consisted of only nine episodes, making it the shortest season to date. Season one had nine series regulars, three of whom have been part of the main cast ever since. The season initially served as a mid-season replacement for the legal drama Boston Legal, airing in the Sunday night time slot at 10:00, after Desperate Housewives. The season was officially released on DVD as two-disc Region 1 box set under the title of Grey's Anatomy: Season One on February 14, 2006, by Buena Vista Home Entertainment.

The series' protagonist and title character is Dr. Meredith Grey (Ellen Pompeo), who is accepted into the residency program at the fictional Seattle Grace Hospital. She joins the program as an intern and is assigned to work under their resident Dr. Miranda Bailey (Chandra Wilson), along with fellow interns: the extremely competitive Dr. Cristina Yang (Sandra Oh), the insecure Dr. George O'Malley (T. R. Knight), ex-model Dr. Izzie Stevens (Katherine Heigl), and the arrogant Dr. Alex Karev (Justin Chambers). The surgical wing is primarily supervised by the Chief of Surgery Dr. Richard Webber (James Pickens Jr.). Dr. Preston Burke (Isaiah Washington) is the head of cardiothoracic surgery. Meredith begins a romantic relationship with her attending Derek Shepherd (Patrick Dempsey), a stranger she had a one-night stand with. Her mother is renowned surgeon Ellis Grey (Kate Burton), who now has Alzheimer's.

The season's reviews and critiques were highly positive, and the series received several awards and nominations for the cast and crew including three nominations at the 57th Primetime Emmy Awards including Outstanding Supporting Actress in a Drama Series for Oh. The series also received three nominations at the Golden Globe Awards with the series itself being nominated for Best Drama Series, Dempsey nominated for Best Actor in a Drama Series, Oh winning the Best Supporting Actress while the entire cast was nominated in the Outstanding Cast – Drama Series category. Oh also won the Outstanding Actress in a Drama Series at the 12th Screen Actors Guild Awards.

The last four episodes, written and shot to air as the final episodes of the first season, actually aired as part of the beginning of the second season, due to the high number of viewers that watched "Who's Zoomin' Who?", the season's highest-rated episode with 22.22 million viewers tuning in. The series was chosen in the top 10 for several 2005 "best of television" lists, including USA Today, San Jose Mercury News, The New York Times, The Boston Globe and Chicago Tribune. Screen Rant ranked the season at number seven on their 2023 ranking of the 19 Grey's Anatomy seasons that had aired at the time.

== Episodes ==
The number in the "No. in series" column refers to the episode's number within the overall series, whereas the number in the "No. in season" column refers to the episode's number within this particular season. "U.S. viewers in millions" refers to the number of Americans in millions who watched the episodes live. The first season's episodes are altogether 387 minutes in length. Each episode of this season is named after a song.

No. overall	No. in season	Title	Directed by	Written by	Original release date	Prod. code	U.S. viewers (millions)
1	1	"A Hard Day's Night"	Peter Horton	Shonda Rhimes	March 27, 2005	101	16.25
Meredith Grey (Ellen Pompeo) wakes up after a one-night stand to start her first shift as a surgical intern. The first shift for Meredith and the new surgical interns—Cristina Yang (Sandra Oh), Izzie Stevens (Katherine Heigl), George O'Malley (T.R. Knight), and Alex Karev (Justin Chambers)—proves eventful and backbreaking. While working, Meredith realizes that the man from her one-night stand is Dr. Derek Shepherd (Patrick Dempsey), her attending physician. Derek enlists the interns' work to solve the case of a teenage girl baton twirler who has seizures. Meredith and Cristina realize that she has an aneurysm that was burst by a fall.
2	2	"The First Cut Is the Deepest"	Peter Horton	Shonda Rhimes	April 3, 2005	102	17.71
Meredith looks for roommates to share her mother's house with, but initially does not want to room with Izzie and George. Derek and Meredith tend to a rape victim. While looking at newborn babies in the hospital, Meredith and George discover a newborn baby's ailment, but a fellow intern tries to dismiss their concerns. Izzie helps out a Chinese woman whose daughter is in need of medical care. Derek and Dr. Preston Burke (Isaiah Washington) quarrel over the Chief of Surgery position.
3	3	"Winning a Battle, Losing the War"	Tony Goldwyn	Shonda Rhimes	April 10, 2005	103	17.99
Competition between the interns over patients ensues after an annual unauthorized bike race causes many injuries. Izzie has trouble locating the family of a near brain-dead man, and Cristina is excited when the patient's family agrees to harvest his organs if he dies, leading Miranda Bailey (Chandra Wilson) to lecture her on bedside manner. A patient who is a friend of Dr. Richard Webber (James Pickens, Jr.) flirts with George. One of the patients from the bike race flirts with Meredith.
4	4	"No Man's Land"	Adam Davidson	James D. Parriott	April 17, 2005	104	19.18
When a retired nurse at Seattle Grace is admitted, Cristina takes on her case and befriends her. A patient who recognizes Izzie from a modeling photo does not want her to treat him. Meredith and Derek treat a construction worker who surprisingly survived his injuries, but they have bad news for his wife about his future. Alex humiliates Izzie in front of the staff by posting her modeling photo all over the hospital.
5	5	"Shake Your Groove Thing"	John David Coles	Ann Hamilton	April 24, 2005	105	17.90
Izzie plans a party for her boyfriend; however, when she elects to perform brain surgery instead of going to the party, he realizes their lives are going in different directions and breaks up with her. Meanwhile, Meredith believes she may be in trouble when something goes wrong during a procedure. Bailey and Webber extract a surgical towel from an old patient of Burke's. At the party, Bailey spots Derek and Meredith together in Meredith's car. Cristina and Burke have sex in an on-call room.
6	6	"If Tomorrow Never Comes"	Scott Brazil	Krista Vernoff	May 1, 2005	106	17.88
When Derek picks Meredith to assist in surgery on a patient with Parkinson's disease, Bailey thinks he is showing favoritism and is tough on Meredith. Alex befriends a patient who has a very large tumor, but when he talks about her behind her back, she requests he be removed from her case. Alex's pager runs out of batteries, which means Izzie has to perform a dangerous procedure on her own. Absent: James Pickens Jr. as Richard Webber
7	7	"The Self-Destruct Button"	Darnell Martin	Kip Koenig	May 8, 2005	107	18.87
Derek spends the night at Meredith's, which they try to keep secret from Izzie and George. George suspects an anesthesiologist of drinking before major surgeries but is scolded when he speaks up. Alex treats a man who enjoys being in pain. Izzie treats a man who swallowed his girlfriend's keys to stop her from leaving. Meredith treats a teen who had a gastric bypass in Mexico that she doesn't want her parents knowing about. It turns out that the anesthesiologist does drink before surgeries, and he gets kicked out of the OR. Cristina believes she's caught the flu, only to discover that she is pregnant. Absent: James Pickens Jr. as Richard Webber
8	8	"Save Me"	Sarah Pia Anderson	Mimi Schmir	May 15, 2005	108	18.33
Alex treats a teenage Orthodox Jew who refuses surgery when she learns the procedure goes against her beliefs. Cristina has trouble relating to a pregnant woman who has terminal cancer and refuses to abort the baby. Meredith and Derek clash over their relationship and how best to treat a man who is becoming paralyzed. Izzie is mesmerized by a patient who has psychic abilities; the patient is later diagnosed with arteriovenous malformation. Absent: James Pickens Jr. as Richard Webber
9	9	"Who's Zoomin' Who?"	Wendey Stanzler	Gabrielle Stanton & Harry Werksman, Jr.	May 22, 2005	109	22.22
When a number of interns, including George, are diagnosed with STDs, Dr. Webber calls an emergency meeting. Meanwhile, Meredith, Derek, and Bailey have to perform an operation on Dr. Webber without anyone else knowing. Izzie and Cristina want to perform an unauthorized autopsy against the patient's family's wishes. Burke, George, and Alex treat one of Burke's male friends, who is discovered to have an ovary and is sterile. Dr. Webber wakes up from his operation to find out that Meredith and Derek are together. Meredith is shocked when someone from Derek's past arrives at Seattle Grace: his wife, Addison (Kate Walsh).

== Cast and characters ==
=== Main ===
- Ellen Pompeo as Dr. Meredith Grey
- Sandra Oh as Dr. Cristina Yang
- Katherine Heigl as Dr. Izzie Stevens
- Justin Chambers as Dr. Alex Karev
- T. R. Knight as Dr. George O'Malley
- Chandra Wilson as Dr. Miranda Bailey
- James Pickens Jr.. as Dr. Richard Webber
- Isaiah Washington as Dr. Preston Burke
- Patrick Dempsey as Dr. Derek Shepherd

=== Notable guests ===
- Kate Walsh as Dr. Addison Montgomery
- Kate Burton as Ellis Grey
- Sarah Utterback as Olivia Harper
- Skyler Shaye as Katie Bryce
- Kathryn Joosten as Stephanie Drake
- Kevin Rahm as Mr. Duff
- Lauren Bowles as Alice Franklin
- Anjul Nigam as Dr. Raj Sen
- Anna Maria Horsford as Elizabeth Fallon
- Robin Pearson Rose as Patricia Murphy

== Production ==
=== Development ===
The series was created by Shonda Rhimes and was aired on the ABC Network in the U.S. The season was produced by Touchstone Television, currently ABC Signature, The Mark Gordon Company, ShondaLand Production Company, and was distributed by Buena Vista International, Inc. The season's executive producers were Rhimes, Betsy Beers, Mark Gordon, James D. Parriott, Krista Vernoff, Rob Corn, and Mark Wilding. The staff writers were Rhimes, Parriott, Ann Hamilton, Vernoff, Kip Koenig, Mimi Schmir, Gabrielle Stanton, and Harry Werksman, Jr. The directors throughout the season were Peter Horton, Tony Goldwyn, Adam Davidson. John David Coles, Scott Brazil, Darnell Martin, Sarah Pia Anderson, and Wendey Stanzler. Rhimes served as the season's showrunner. She and Horton, who wrote and directed the first two episodes respectively, would also have written and directed the season's final two episodes, had they not been transferred into the second season.

The show was announced in May 2004, where it had originally been scheduled to air from January 2005 on Monday nights at 10:00pm EST, before it was decided that Supernanny would instead air in that time slot, with Grey's Anatomy switched to be the mid-season replacement for Boston Legal on Sunday nights, with the debut delayed until March. It was originally scheduled to run in the Boston Legal time slot for just four weeks, but after receiving high ratings remained in the time-slot for the remainder of the season. ABC Entertainment President Steve McPherson commented on the scheduling decision: "Ultimately we decided that, without having adequate lead time or marketing dollars to devote to moving either show so late in the season, we'd continue to let Grey's build on its tremendous momentum through May". Prior to broadcast, it was announced that the show's title would change from Grey's Anatomy to Complications, although ultimately this did not come to pass.

Francie Calfo, executive vice president for development at ABC Entertainment, commented on the show's conception: "I think there was a need for this kind of show on our air, specifically a medical show. And Shonda found a twist on it that made it perfect for where we're at right now. Medical shows are hard, and it was hard trying to figure out where ours could be different. But where everybody else is speeding up their medical shows, she found a way to slow it down, so you get to know the characters. There's definitely a strong female appeal to it". Rhimes explained that she had found the idea of a show about smart women competing against one another an interesting one.

=== Casting ===
Nine actors had star billing in the show's first season. Series creator Shonda Rhimes wanted a diverse cast, and so created characters without pre-specified races. Determined not to have a show in which "all the extras are white, except the lone janitor", she has created what The New York Times has called "one of the most colorful backgrounds in television." Rhimes used a "blind-casting" technique, which resulted in several roles going to actors of different racial backgrounds than first envisioned. Isaiah Washington, eventually cast as Preston Burke, was originally considered for the role of Derek Shepherd, while Burke was initially to be played by a white actor who dropped out at the last moment. Chandra Wilson was cast in the role of Miranda Bailey, who Rhimes had imagined as a blonde until auditioning Wilson. The Campus have observed that the Grey's Anatomy cast is actually more diverse than the city it emulates, noting that Seattle is actually 70% Caucasian.

The nine characters who appear as series-regulars in the first season all work in the fictional Seattle Grace Hospital. Five of the characters are interns: Meredith Grey portrayed by Ellen Pompeo, who is in a romantic relationship with her attending Derek Shepherd, and is the daughter of the renowned surgeon Ellis Grey, who now has Alzheimer's; Cristina Yang portrayed by Sandra Oh, an extremely competitive intern who befriends Meredith and begins a relationship with Preston Burke; Izzie Stevens portrayed by Katherine Heigl, an ex-model who struggles to be recognized as a doctor; Alex Karev portrayed by Justin Chambers, an arrogant intern who initially annoys his colleagues, and George O'Malley portrayed by T. R. Knight, an insecure intern with a lack of confidence, who develops a crush on Meredith. The interns are mentored by their resident Miranda Bailey portrayed by Chandra Wilson, a disciplined woman who is nicknamed "The Nazi". The surgical program is led by the Chief of Surgery Dr. Richard Webber portrayed by James Pickens Jr. In his employ are Preston Burke and Derek Shepherd from New York portrayed by Isaiah Washington and Patrick Dempsey respectively. Guest stars include Meredith's mother Ellis, portrayed by Kate Burton, nurse Olivia Harper portrayed by Sarah Utterback, who serves as a love-interest for Alex and George, and Derek's estranged wife Addison Montgomery played by Kate Walsh.

== Release ==
The first season's ratings were consistently high, ranking #1 in its time-slot and leading its closest competition by 7.2 million viewers. It delivered ABC's best audience retention following Desperate Housewives, was the highest-rated show amongst 18-to-49-year-olds in 13 years since The Young Indiana Jones Chronicles, and produced ABC's strongest series performance in the hour in more than 4 years. Commenting on the first season's high ratings, Magna Global USA media analyst Steve Sternberg stated: "Roughly 80 percent of households during primetime only have one TV set on. People are looking for shows they can watch with other household members. And just as Desperate Housewives reaches a broad audience – younger, older, male, female – so does Grey's Anatomy". The season finale was watched by 22.22 million viewers, and was ranked No. 9 in viewership.

Although no clip shows were produced during the season, the events that occur are recapped in "Straight to Heart", a clip show which aired one week before the winter holiday hiatus of the second season ended.

== Reception ==
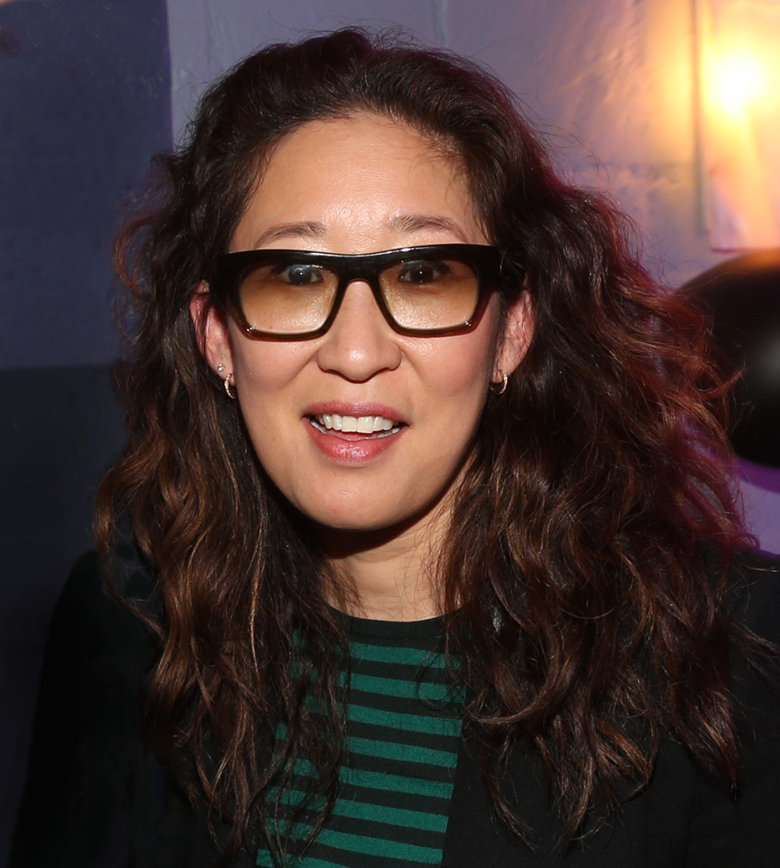
Sandra Oh received her first out of five consecutive Primetime Emmy Award nominations, for her performance during the season

The first season of Grey's received positive reviews from critics. In regard to the first season, New York Daily News named Grey's Anatomy a "winner", whereas Newsday expressed a positive opinion by stating "You simply can't stop watching!" Walter Chaw from Film Freak Central said the show was "so odious, so repugnant, that it's impossible not to have predicted its newly-minted role as the most popular program in the land." The Washington Post's Tom Shales was critical of the early series, finding it reminiscent of ER and commenting that: "The show is much more a matter of commercial calculation than an honest attempt to try something fresh and different." He called Rhimes' script for the pilot episode "nothing but a casserole made of equal parts ham-and-corn", writing that overall: "It's a 'new' show only in the sense that Dr. Frankenstein's monster was a new man." Kate Aurthur for The New York Times deemed the show a hybrid of Ally McBeal, Sex and the City and ER, writing of the news that it had become the highest-rated midseason drama in 12 years that: "When you parse its ratings, Grey's Anatomy underscores one of the real lessons of the current season - men will watch shows with a female lead. That goes against conventional wisdom, which dictates that it's easier to get women to watch shows aimed at men." Review Stream gave positive reviews regarding the pilot episode, "A Hard Day's Night", due to the undeniable chemistry between Ellen Pompeo and Patrick Dempsey from the series' first scene. Regarding Miranda Bailey's appearance in the pilot, ReviewStream.com stated "She's such a small woman but wait until she speaks." HomeTheaterInfo.com, however, had a mixed perspectives on the pilot, noting that the storylines were similar to fellow ABC series Desperate Housewives, but also "brilliantly written, extremely well-acted and directed to near perfection." IGN gave a positive review stating, "The show isn't derivative, and actually maintains a tenuous edge over its predecessor, the characters resemble real people - who are fragile, and yes, fallible." and added, "this facile description does little justice to the show's tightly-wound plotting, character subtleties, or masterful acting, it speaks to the intangible nature of what differentiates the wheat from the chaff, so to speak, in network television."

== Awards ==
Sandra Oh won Best Supporting Actress – Series, Miniseries or Television Film at the 63rd Golden Globe Awards and Outstanding Performance by a Female Actor in a Drama Series at the 12th Screen Actors Guild Awards in 2005 for her portrayal of Cristina Yang during Grey's Anatomy's first season.

The season also resulted in a number of awards nominations. At the 2005 Directors Guild of America Awards, Peter Horton received a nomination for the Best Directing in a Drama Series, for his work on the series premiere "A Hard Day's Night". He was nominated for the same award and episode at the 57th Primetime Emmy Awards, which also saw Grey's Anatomy nominated for Outstanding Casting for a Drama Series, and Oh was nominated Outstanding Supporting Actress in a Drama Series. Patrick Dempsey was nominated for Best Actor – Television Series Drama at the 63rd Golden Globe Awards, where the show was also nominated Best Television Series – Drama.

The Producers Guild of America Awards in 2005 saw the season again nominated for Best Producer in a Drama Series, while that year's Satellite Awards saw the show nominated for Best Television Series – Drama, and Oh nominated for Best Supporting Actress – Series, Miniseries or Television Film. Dempsey was nominated for the Outstanding Performance by a Male Actor in a Drama Series at the 12th Screen Actors Guild Awards, where the whole cast were also nominated for Outstanding Performance by an Ensemble in a Drama Series. Ellen Pompeo and Justin Chambers were also nominated for Choice TV Breakout Performances at the 2005 Teen Choice Awards.

== DVD release ==
Grey's Anatomy: Season One was released as a widescreen 2-disc Region 1 DVD box set in the USA on February 14, 2006. It was distributed by Buena Vista. In addition to all the episodes that had aired, it included an alternate title-sequence, audio commentaries, an extended pilot episode and a making-of featurette. The same set was released on October 11, 2006, in Region 2, featuring the planned 14 episodes over 3 discs.

The first season was officially released on DVD in Region 1 on February 14, 2006, during the show's second season. Under the title Grey's Anatomy: Season One, the box set consists of episodes with Dolby Digital 5.1 surround sound and widescreen format. It also contained extras available only on DVD, including extended episodes, footage from behind the scenes, audio commentaries and unaired scenes cut from the aired episodes. The same set was released in Region 4 on April 26, 2006, almost 3 months after its original release in the United States, whereas its release date in Region 4 was October 11, 2006. The UK set contained the original 14 episodes, being released as a 3-disc box-set.

Grey's Anatomy: The Complete First Season
Set Details		Special Features
9 Episodes (1 extended); 2-Disc Set; English (Dolby Digital 5.1 Surround); Audio Commentaries		Under the Knife: Behind the Scenes of Grey's Anatomy; Anatomy Of A Pilot; Dissecting Grey's Anatomy; Pilot - Shonda Rhimes and Peter Horton; Pilot - Sandra Oh, Katherine Heigl and T. R. Knight; Alternate title track; Avant-garde trailer
Release Dates
Region 1	Region 2	Region 4
February 14, 2006	October 11, 2006	April 26, 2006
