= Bruce Weitz =

American actor (born 1943)

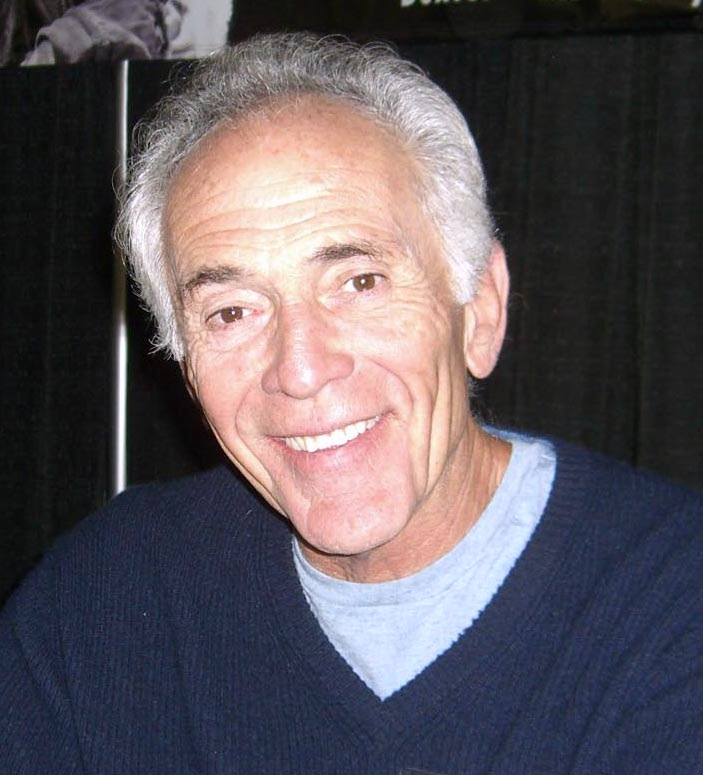
- Weitz at the Big Apple Convention in Manhattan, 2009
- Born: Bruce Peter Weitz; May 27, 1943 (age 83); Norwalk, Connecticut, U.S.
- Occupation: Actor
- Years active: 1976–present
- Known for: Sgt. Michael Belker – Hill Street Blues
- Spouses: Cecilia Hart (m. 1971; div. 1980); Vivian Davis (m. 1986)
- Children: 1

Bruce Peter Weitz (born May 27, 1943) is an American actor, best known for his role as Sgt. Michael "Mick" Belker in the TV series Hill Street Blues, which ran from 1981 until 1987. For his role in the series, he received six nominations for Emmy Awards and two for Golden Globe Awards, winning the 1984 Emmy for Outstanding Supporting Actor in a Drama Series. He is also known for playing Stuart Caley, MSNBC boss, in Deep Impact.

== Biography ==
Weitz was born on May 27, 1943, in Norwalk, Connecticut, the son of Sybil (née Rubel), a homemaker, and Joseph Weitz, who owned a liquor store.

Weitz appeared in the films Deep Impact, Half Past Dead and El Cortez. His guest appearances on television include NYPD Blue, Quincy, Midnight Caller, Sisters, Superman: The Animated Series as Bruno Mannheim, JAG, The X-Files, The West Wing, and Highlander: The Series. Weitz portrayed Anthony Zacchara on General Hospital from 2007 to 2012.

Weitz married actress Cecilia Hart in 1971; they divorced in 1980. Weitz has been married to Vivian Davis since 1986; they have one son. In 2001, Weitz was named honorary mayor of Reseda, Los Angeles.

== Selected filmography ==
=== Television ===
Year	Title	Role	Notes
1975	Columbo	Cook	Episode: "A Case of Immunity"; uncredited
1976	Ryan's Hope	Benjamin Levine	2 episodes
1977	Quincy, M.E.	Boyd	Episode: "The Hero Syndrome"
1978	Happy Days	Robert Clark	Episode: "Kid Stuff"
1981	Death of a Centerfold	Paul Snider	Television film
1981–1987	Hill Street Blues	Mick Belker	Main cast (142 episodes)
1987–1988	Mama's Boy	Jake McCaskey	6 episodes
1989	A Deadly Silence	Detective McCready	Television film
1989	A Cry for Help: The Tracey Thurman Story	Burton Weinstein	Television film
1989	Midnight Caller	Ed Adderly	Episode: "Mercy Me"
1990	Rainbow Drive	Dan Crawford	Television film
1991–1992	Anything but Love	Mike Urbanek	27 episodes
1994	Highlander: The Series	Tommy Sullivan	Episode: "The Fighter"
1994	Duckman	Mad Bomber (voice)	Episode: "I, Duckman"
1994	The Byrds of Paradise	Murray Rubenstein	3 episodes
1994	Batman: The Animated Series	Lyle Bolton / Lock-Up (voice)	Episode: "Lock-Up"
1994	Lois & Clark: The New Adventures of Superman	Martin Snell	Episode: "Church of Metropolis"
1995	The X-Files	Moe Bocks	Episode: "Irresistible"
1995	Aaahh!!! Real Monsters	Luxor, Porg (voice)	2 episodes
1995	Murder, She Wrote	Max Franklin	Episode: "Twice Dead"
1995	Her Hidden Truth	Ricky Levine	Television film
1996	NYPD Blue	Lawrence Curry	Episode: "Yes Sir, That's My Baby"
1996–1998	Superman: The Animated Series	Bruno Mannheim (voice)	4 episodes
1997	JAG	Chief Petty Officer Paul Bauwer	Episode: "The Guardian"
1998	Due South	Huck	Episode: "Dr Longball"
1999	The Wacky Adventures of Ronald McDonald	Blather (voice)	Episode: "The Legend of Grimace Island"
2000	The West Wing	Senate Majority Leader	Episode: "Mandatory Minimums"
2002	Third Watch	Uncle Mike	Episode: "Two Hundred and Thirty-Three Days"
2002–2003	Judging Amy	Martin	5 episodes
2002–2003	The Guardian	Jake's Father	2 episodes
2003	ER	Alderman John Bright	4 episodes
2003	The Practice	Robert Webb	Episode: "Rape Shield"
2004	JAG	Hank Olin	Episode: "The Man on the Bridge"
2004	Sue Thomas: F.B.Eye	Wes Kenner	Episode: "The Mentor"
2005	Grey's Anatomy	Edward Levangie	Episode: "If Tomorrow Never Comes"
2005	Ghost Whisperer	Tobias Northrop	Episode: "Lost Boys"
2006	Though None Go with Me	Will Bishop	Television film
2007	Dexter	Lenny Asher	Episode: "Morning Comes"
2007–2012	General Hospital	Antony Zacchara	234 episodes
2008	CSI: Crime Scene Investigation	Leon Slocomb	Episode: "The Happy Place"
2013	The Young and the Restless	Barry	2 episodes
2021	For All Mankind	William Waverly	Episode: "Don't Be Cruel"

=== Film ===
Year	Title	Role	Notes
1977	The Private Files of J. Edgar Hoover	Voice on Tape	
1994	The Liars' Club	Jack	
1995	Prehysteria! 3	Hal McGregor	
1998	Deep Impact	Stuart Caley	
2001	Mach 2	Phil Jefferson	
2002	Half Past Dead	Lester McKenna	
2004	Dinocroc	Dr. Campell	
2007	The Dukes	Toulio	
2008	Triloquist	Dummy (voice)	
2008	My Apocalypse	Jack Savage	
2009	Imps*	Larry	
