= No Such Thing as Vampires =

- Moonlight episode
- Beth Turner (Sophia Myles) tries to take a picture of the body of a murdered young woman.
- Episode no.: Season 1 Episode 1
- Directed by: Rod Holcomb
- Written by: Trevor Munson; Ron Koslow
- Production code: 101
- Original air date: September 28, 2007

Guest appearances
- Brian J. White as Lt. Carl Davis; Jacob Vargas as Guillermo; Kevin Weisman as Steve Blafour; Tami Roman as Maureen "Mo" Williams; Rudolf Martin as Christian Ellis; Dean O'Gorman as Daniel; Shoshana Bush as Chloe

Episode chronology
← Previous —	Next → "Out of the Past"

"No Such Thing as Vampires" is the pilot episode of the American paranormal romance television drama Moonlight, which premiered on CBS on September 28, 2007. It was written by series creators/executive producers Trevor Munson and Ron Koslow, and directed by executive producer Rod Holcomb. The pilot introduces Mick St. John (Alex O'Loughlin), a private investigator who has been a vampire for over 50 years; Beth Turner (Sophia Myles), St. John's love interest; Josef Kostan (Jason Dohring), St. John's mentor and friend; and Coraline Duvall (Shannyn Sossamon), St. John's ex-wife and sire.

== Plot ==
Private investigator Mick St. John dreams of being interviewed by a woman off-camera, where he reveals that he is 84 years old, and that unlike other vampires, he does not hunt women, children or innocents. Mick's job leads him to the scene of a murdered young woman, who had been pregnant with twins, and where Beth, an online newspaper reporter for the BuzzWire, notices two large puncture wounds on the woman's neck. While walking around the scene, she meets Mick and tells him he looks very familiar, but he insists that they do not know each other. Beth gives the murder article a vampire theme, using the puncture wounds as inspiration. The article makes Josef, a 400-year-old vampire friend of Mick's, concerned for the safety of vampires. To gather more authentic information about the murder, Mick goes to the morgue, where his friend Guillermo (Jacob Vargas) supplies him with blood. Mick does not detect any traces of vampire contact on the dead woman, eliminating them as her reason of death. Mick then comes across Beth at the dead woman's apartment, where they find a necklace containing a blood vial.

Professor Ellis (Rudolf Martin), a lecturer of the dead woman, gives a eulogy at her funeral. Chloe, a friend of the dead woman, attacks and slashes the neck of Ellis, whose blood Mick recognizes from the vial. Beth tracks down Chloe, who explains that the professor believes he is a vampire and has a vampire-worshipping blood cult. Later, Mick finds Chloe's body and realizes that she was murdered by Ellis. Knowing that Beth has gone to Ellis's class, he rushes to save her. After the class, Beth talks to Ellis about vampires and the young woman's murder, but he discovers that she is wearing a wire. Ellis attacks Beth and although she escapes, she is kidnapped by the professor's assistant. Mick finds the assistant, defeats him, and carries unconscious Beth to his apartment. In flashbacks to 22 years in the past, Mick investigates the case of a missing girl. In a domestic fight between Mick and his ex-wife Coraline over the kidnapped girl, Mick stabs Coraline's heart with the leg of a broken chair. He lights the house on fire and rescues the girl, leaving Coraline to the fire. It is revealed that the little girl is Beth, and that Mick has tried to watch over her and keep her safe. In the present, Beth awakens and remembers that Mick was stabbed by the assistant, and that he was the one who saved her as a child. Mick dismisses these claims as being caused by her head injury. Thanking him for saving her, she hugs him.

== Production ==
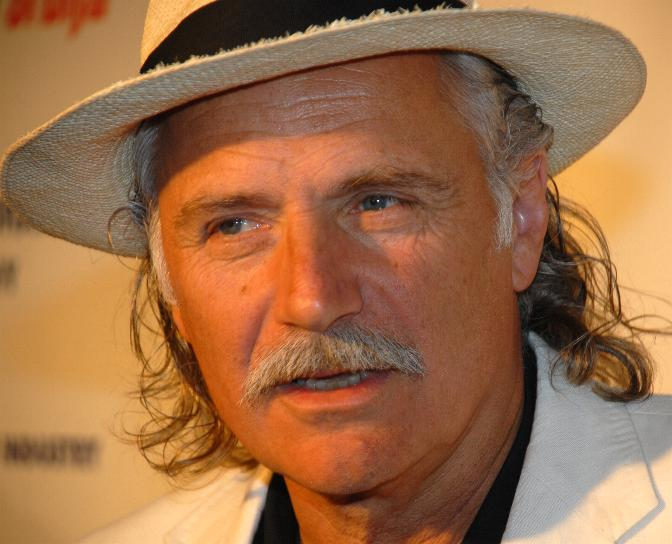
Rade Šerbedžija was originally cast to play Josef Kostan, but was replaced by Jason Dohring to make way for a younger cast.

Trevor Munson conceived the character of Mick Angel in 2004 and spent two and a half years writing a novel featuring the character. The story was adapted into a feature film script, and Bruce Willis was considered as a possibility for the lead role. The script was shown to Nina Tassler at CBS, who paired Munson with Ron Koslow, creator of Beauty and the Beast, to rewrite the script as a television series. The series was titled Twilight, and Koslow and Munson wrote the pilot, which Warner Bros. Television initially commissioned in January 2007 as a presentation lasting 14–20 minutes. Joel Silver and Gerard Bocaccio were hired to be executive producers on the project under the former's production banner, Silver Pictures, in the same month. Alex O'Loughlin and Shannon Lucio were cast in the presentation, and Rod Holcomb was hired as director.

The project was renamed Moonlight when picked up by CBS on May 14, 2007, prior the upfronts. David Greenwalt, creator of Miracles and co-creator of Angel, joined the staff in May 2007 as showrunner and executive producer alongside Silver. CBS hired Greenwalt during the pilot process to restructure the original concept by Koslow and Munson, however health reasons forced him to leave the series, and Chip Johannessen took over showrunner duties in August 2007. All of the original actors save for the lead role of Mick St. John were recast in June 2007: Shannon Lucio, Rade Šerbedžija and Amber Valletta were originally cast in the roles of Beth Turner, Josef Kostan and Coraline Duvall respectively before Sophia Myles, Jason Dohring and Shannyn Sossamon replaced them. With an almost entirely different cast, a retooled full-length pilot for television audiences was shot. To promote the series, Silver, along with the rest of the main cast, attended the Comic-Con International in San Diego on July 27, 2007, where the show was featured.

According to Dohring, Silver had unexpectedly phoned him and said, "There's a role, and I'm making it younger". Dohring read two pages of script featuring Josef, and was interested by the character's "dark" and "sharp" personality. Dohring had to go through the normal audition process and was not sure if he would have gotten the role without Silver, who had "pushed it all the way through to the end". Munson explained that the goal of the casting changes was "to lighten the show up a bit". He believed the changes granted the studio's and network's wish to "make it a little younger and hipper". O'Laughlin felt that the whole cast's becoming "a little bit younger" especially affected the character Josef, as the originally chosen actor, Šerbedžija, was twice Dohring's age. The creators and the network were concerned that Josef, whose relationship with Mick was important, would appear as more of a "father figure" rather than as a friend. O'Laughlin supported the recasting of Josef with a younger actor due to the resulting "level of ease in that age difference".

== Reception ==
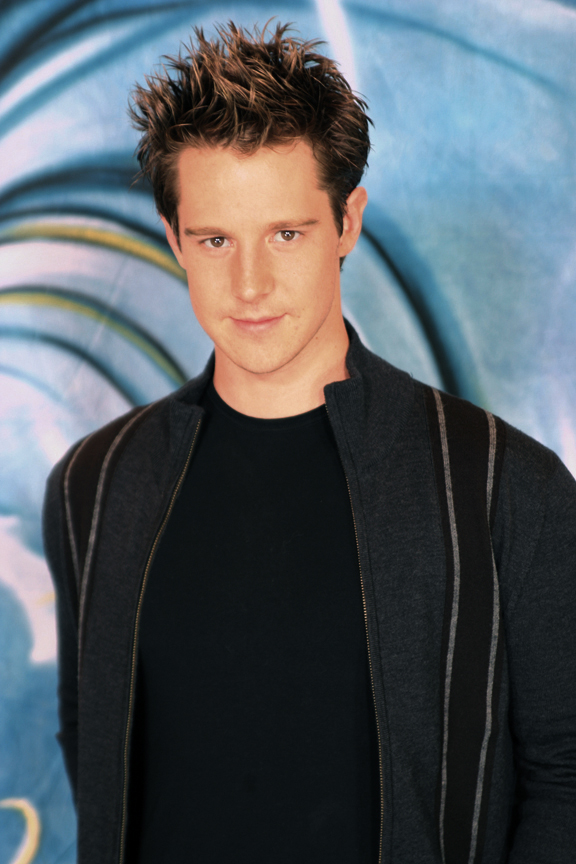
Although reviews of the pilot were generally unfavorable, Jason Dohring was praised by several critics.

"No Such Thing as Vampires" finished first among total viewers and adults 18–49 for its night. It was seen by 8.54 million American viewers, and received a 5.7 household rating and a 10% share of all televisions in use. The critical responses to the pilot were overall unfavorable. Several critics compared it detrimentally with the television series Buffy the Vampire Slayer and its spinoff Angel, as well as other vampire-related media, including Forever Knight, Blood Ties, The Night Stalker, Dark Shadows and the works of Anne Rice. Tim Goodman of the San Francisco Chronicle considered it as a "flat-out awful" pilot of what "may well be the worst new fall show". Rob Owen of the Pittsburgh Post-Gazette described the pilot as "a weak, generic private-eye drama with a vampire story overlay", and Matthew Gilbert of the Boston Globe felt that it came close to a "full-on nightmare".

The writing of the pilot was criticized as "ponderous", and having "familiar, conventional plots". One critic claimed it did not offer much "to inspire an actor", while another thought it had the "worst writing of the new season". The dialogue was described as "groan-inducing". Tom Shales of The Washington Post criticized the series creators' decision to make St. John a private investigator, and felt that they "appear eager to avoid what makes their show unique". Mary McNamara of the Los Angeles Times saw promise in the series, but remarked it got "lost between concept and execution, and instead of suspense we get silliness, as if the creators were determined to use only the clichés of both genres". The acting of the pilot was criticized as "sub-par" and "woeful". Robert Bianco of USA Today felt that Moonlight had a "less adept cast" than Angel. Matthew Gilbert of the Boston Globe deprecated the chemistry between O'Loughlin and Myles as "artificial", and said that they "exchange lines of dialogue with a stilted rhythm and no natural flow". O'Loughlin was described as a "flatliner", and "passable in the lead role", while Sossamon's appearance was said to be "preposterously not-scary". Travis Fickett of IGN praised the actors, however, and felt that O'Loughlin did "a decent job", and that Myles was "perhaps the most promising aspect of the show". Maureen Ryan of the Chicago Tribune commended Myles as "reasonably good".

Not all reviews, however, were negative. Sarah Stegall of SF Scope gave the pilot a decent review, and said that if Moonlight could survive "the Friday night time slot" and the "thwarted expectations of [vampire] fans who were expecting Blade", she thought it would "rock". Kara Howland of TV Guide gave the pilot a positive review, and thought it was a "solid start". Several critics praised Jason Dohring's portrayal of Josef. One said that he gave the pilot "a small burst of energy", while another said that he made it "crackle with a bit of wit". Dohring was described as "a welcome presence", and one critic wished for "a bit more screen time". Travis Fickett of IGN praised the action scenes, and noted, "once the action gets started, it plays well".
