= Oyster Farmer =

- Promotional poster
- Directed by: Anna Reeves
- Written by: Anna Reeves
- Produced by: Anthony Buckley; Piers Tempest
- Starring: Alex O'Loughlin; Jim Norton; Diana Glenn; Kerry Armstrong
- Cinematography: Alun Bollinger
- Edited by: Peter Beston; Jamie Trevill
- Music by: Stephen Warbeck
- Production companies: Anthony Buckley Films; Tempo Productions Limited
- Distributed by: Sherman Pictures
- Release date: 10 September 2004
- Running time: 91 minutes
- Countries: Australia; United Kingdom
- Language: English

Oyster Farmer is a 2004 Australian romantic comedy/drama film about a 24 year old man who runs away to the Hawkesbury River and finds a job with eighth-generation oyster farmers. It was written and directed by Anna Reeves, produced by Anthony Buckley and Piers Tempest, and stars Alex O'Loughlin and Diana Glenn. The film was both set and filmed in the Hawkesbury River region, Sydney.

== Plot ==
Jack Flange is caring for his sister Nikki, who is in hospital following a serious car accident and is facing dwindling health insurance money to pay for her recovery. To circumvent this, Jack stages a hijack of a payroll van at the Sydney Fish Markets. He sends the money to himself via an Australia Post Box at the crime scene to avoid getting caught. Jack waits for the arrival of the money in Brooklyn, where he lands among a community who make their living off the Hawkesbury River. Amongst these is eight-generation oyster farmer Brownie and his elderly father Mumbles, who Jack applies to for a job as cover while he waits for the money’s arrival. Jack meets Pearl, a cleaning lady with an inclination for expensive shoes. Brownie frequently argues with Mumbles, who believes his advice on oyster farming to be crucial to Brownie’s business. Brownie’s oysters continually spawn prematurely and lack quality, and have done since the departure of Brownie’s estranged wife Trish. Mumbles believes Trish to be the only person capable of salvaging Brownie’s operation since she is highly skilled and has since started her own business. Where Brownie’s oysters decline in value, Trish’s are flourishing.

Jack’s money fails to arrive, making him increasingly anxious. Brownie is concerned for his business and is convinced Trish still loves him, telling Mumbles that they are not getting divorced and that she is just going through a phase. Police officers arrive to interview the oyster farmers in relation to the missing funds at the fish market. Jack tells the officers he was at the fish markets at the time of the robbery but did not see any suspicious behaviour. Jack meets Slug, a wastewater manager who irritates Brownie and gets in a fight with Jack after threatening Mumbles and the other oyster farmers. Jack’s money ends up at the bottom of the Hawkesbury River after the postal worker transporting it has a heart attack and dies. Mumbles continues to insist on Trish’s assistance as Brownie’s oysters steadily decline in condition and Brownie continues to dismiss his advice.

Slug harasses Pearl and threatens Jack when he discovers his interest in her. Pearl arrives at Jack’s house to ask for a lift, and he asks her why she continually deals with Slug’s actions. They argue about each other’s intentions and end up kissing. Jack meets Trish officially, and helps her carry equipment onto her boat. Jack and Trish discuss her abilities and prowess as an oyster farmer, and Jack inquires as to why she left Brownie. Trish says it was because Brownie did not let her help with his business and, oddly, refused to buy her a bathtub. Mumbles reveals to Jack that Slug is actually Pearl’s father. Brownie sees Jack helping Trish again and is irritated by it. Mumbles insists Brownie reconcile with Trish, and Jack suggests by buying her a bathtub. Though he takes Jack’s advice, Brownie begins to suspect Jack and Trish have something between them.

Pearl gets a job at the post office, and Jack pesters her about the whereabouts of his package. Pearl counters by inquiring about its contents and recipient, and Jack says the package is for his sister. Pearl jokes that her co-worker suspects Jack of robbing the fish markets and mailing the money to himself, which he dismisses adamantly. Jack meets and fishes with Skippy, a Vietnam veteran who warns Jack not to sneak around where he is not wanted. Mumbles believes Slug is dumping wastewater in the river to sabotage Brownie’s harvest and confronts him, but Slug denies the accusation. Jack tells Pearl that Nikki is transferring to Gosford hospital. After Pearl confronts him about wastewater dumping, Slug repeatedly denies it and tells Pearl he is abandoning his business. Pearl’s dog runs away to Jack’s house and eats his TV remote, which subsequently kills him. Jack and Mumbles try to resuscitate the dog and in doing so, accidentally knock his body into the river just as Pearl arrives. They deny seeing the dog and Pearl continues looking. Brownie tells Jack that Pearl’s credit card had to be cut up and she has had to be bailed out of jail multiple times, all to do with her shoe habit. Brownie also suggests he buy Pearl a new dog, which he does. Jack and Pearl spend more time together, and eventually sleep together.

Brownie finally asks Trish for help with his oysters, and interrogates Trish about the secret to her success, with her response being that she sings to her oysters. When Brownie laughs at her, she yells at him and tells him she is not coming back to him. The two reconcile and kiss after their son comes into the room. Brownie states his intention to buy back the leases on which Trish farms her oysters to give her full ownership of them, and to give Jack two leases of oyster farms if he takes Mumbles with him. Jack accepts.

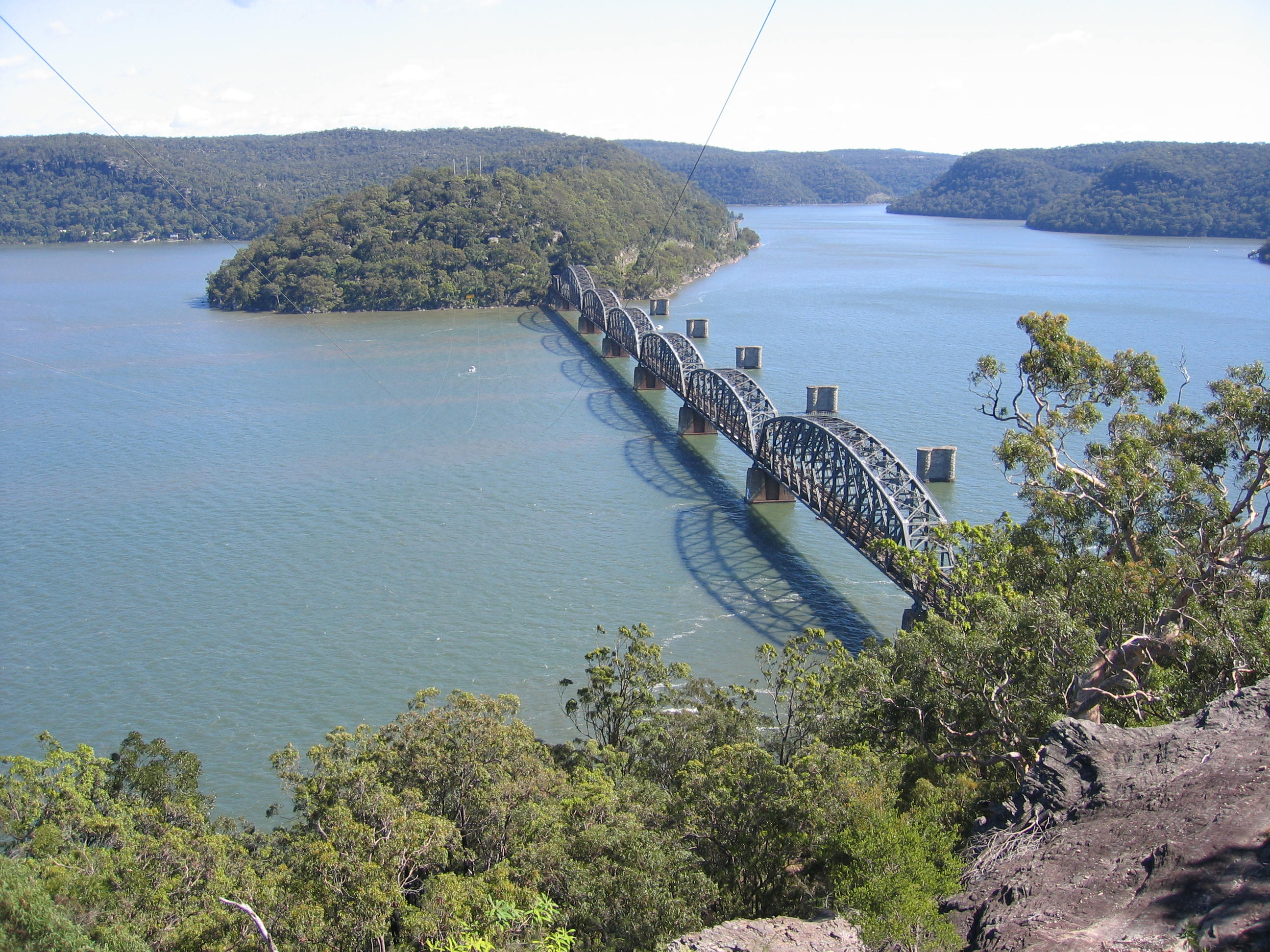
The Hawkesbury River Rail Bridge, where Jack and Nikki are seen travelling to Gosford in the film's final scenes

Jack discovers Mumbles is the one who stole his package of money after losing it to the river, and that he cut up the money and decorated the bathtub Brownie bought Trish with it. Mumbles insists Jack was a terrible criminal, and that the thought would have only given Jack a bad conscience. Jack is horrified, berates Mumbles and states that he is going to quit his job. At an annual oyster competition, Brownie wins first prize, surprising himself and prompting a proud reaction from Trish. Jack moves to Gosford with Nikki. Brownie and Mumbles surprise Trish with her bathtub, and Mumbles reveals to Brownie that Jack quit, disappointing Brownie and Trish. On the train to Gosford, Jack realises his desire to stay at the Hawkesbury River and gets off at the nearest train station. While Brownie, Trish, Mumbles and the rest of the oyster farmers celebrate their win, Jack and Pearl are seen in Trish’s bathtub.

== Cast ==
- Alex O'Loughlin (credited as Alex O'Lachlan) as Jack Flange, a criminal who steals money from a fish market van to help pay the medical bills of his ill sister.
- Jim Norton as Mumbles, Brownie's Irish-born father
- Diana Glenn as Pearl, Jack's love interest
- David Field as Brownie, Jack's boss
- Kerry Armstrong as Trish, Brownie's estranged wife
- Claudia Harrison as Nikki Flange, Jack's sister
- Alan Cinis as Slug, a waste manager who regularly annoys Brownie, Mumbles, Jack and the other oyster farmers under Brownie's employment
- Jack Thompson as Skippy
- Bob Yearley as Bruce
- Brady Kitchingham as Heath
- Gary Henderson as Barry
- Brian Howarth as Barney
- Bill Wisely as Old Man Peterson
- Ian Johnson as Oyster Farmer #1
- Peter Johnson (actor) as Oyster Farmer #2
- Natalie McCurry as Pearl's Mother

== Themes and interpretations ==
=== Regional, working life ===
Oyster Farmer’s thematic and contextual settings are a highly valid aspect of its ambience. Many critics have perceived that the Australian backdrop of the Hawkesbury River and the physical labours of its occupants attribute a recognisable sense of Australian life and its dominant ‘mateship culture’ to the film’s thematic scheme. Paul Byrnes of the Sydney Morning Herald addresses the foundations of this perception in noting ‘the film has an almost ethnographic feel, combining the details of the working lives of the characters with a sly sense of comedy’. Richard Kuipers takes a similar approach to the film’s interpretation, prefacing the film as a ‘small, carefully composed film that rejoices in the parochial lingo and mores of its richly textured characters’ Philip Cenere describes the role the setting plays; ‘it sets the mood, frames the town, and defines the characters. Few settings have so clearly shaped a film’. Jami Bernard of the NY Daily News comments on the effectiveness of the chosen location, observing that ‘The realistic scenes of oyster farming and the beauty of the Hawkesbury River lend this movie a degree of fascination that its taciturn, beer-swilling characters can't provide’. The cultural backdrop provided by the location, urban dialect and working lives of the characters establishes a strong sense of Australian familiarity that pervades the film’s aesthetic.

=== Isolation ===
The comedic elements of the film are balanced with the isolation experienced by the protagonist. Byrnes elaborates by affirming ‘Reeves is careful in early scenes not to overplay the comedy’. Jack’s understanding and relation to the community is frequently undermined, as the film ‘shifts in tone and sense of incompleteness can be seen as a function of Jack's imperfect understanding of the community’. This theme is showcased by the protagonist in his efforts to conceal his motives behind starting work with the local oyster business.

=== Regret and crime ===
Crime is interpreted by reviewers as the catalyst for the film’s events. Sharon Hurst summarises the film as capturing ‘vague feelings about the bitter-sweet quality of life – its longings, broken dreams, hopes, past baggage, forgiveness, and coming to terms and just getting on with it’. The identification of the protagonist’s regret and anxiety to cover his actions is also interpreted as another aspect of his characterisation.

=== Family dynamics ===
Budding family dynamics are an additional element of the film’s subplot. Paul Byrnes of the NFSA briefly addresses these relationships in his excerpt ‘Everyone Needs a Drama’, observing that ‘Brownie’s estrangement from his wife Trish is given almost as much screen time as the burgeoning romance of Jack and Pearl’. The frustration of the relationship between Brownie and his father is also aforementioned, as Byrnes stated ‘Reeves establishes a strong sense of the precarious nature of the trade, but overlays a sense of deep tribal superstition, most of which comes from (Brownie’s) old Irish father, known as Mumbles’.

=== Feminism ===
Catherine Simpson of Macquarie University observed that the film "provides its audience with a novel reconfiguring of gender relations in a small, tight-knit river community – a space rarely glimpsed on screen". Simpson elucidates that the film's "black comic tone" and female directorial lead reconfigures the hierarchical structure of small, regional, working towns. Simpson categorises Trish and her solitary farming endeavours as the balance to the camera’s ‘endless objectification of the central male protagonist’. Brian McFarlane makes a similar observation, stating that Trish's local knowledge of the environment are expressed in her "legendary powers over the spawning habits of oysters" and subsequently become vital for the local industry, despite her colleague's prejudices.

== Production ==
=== Development ===
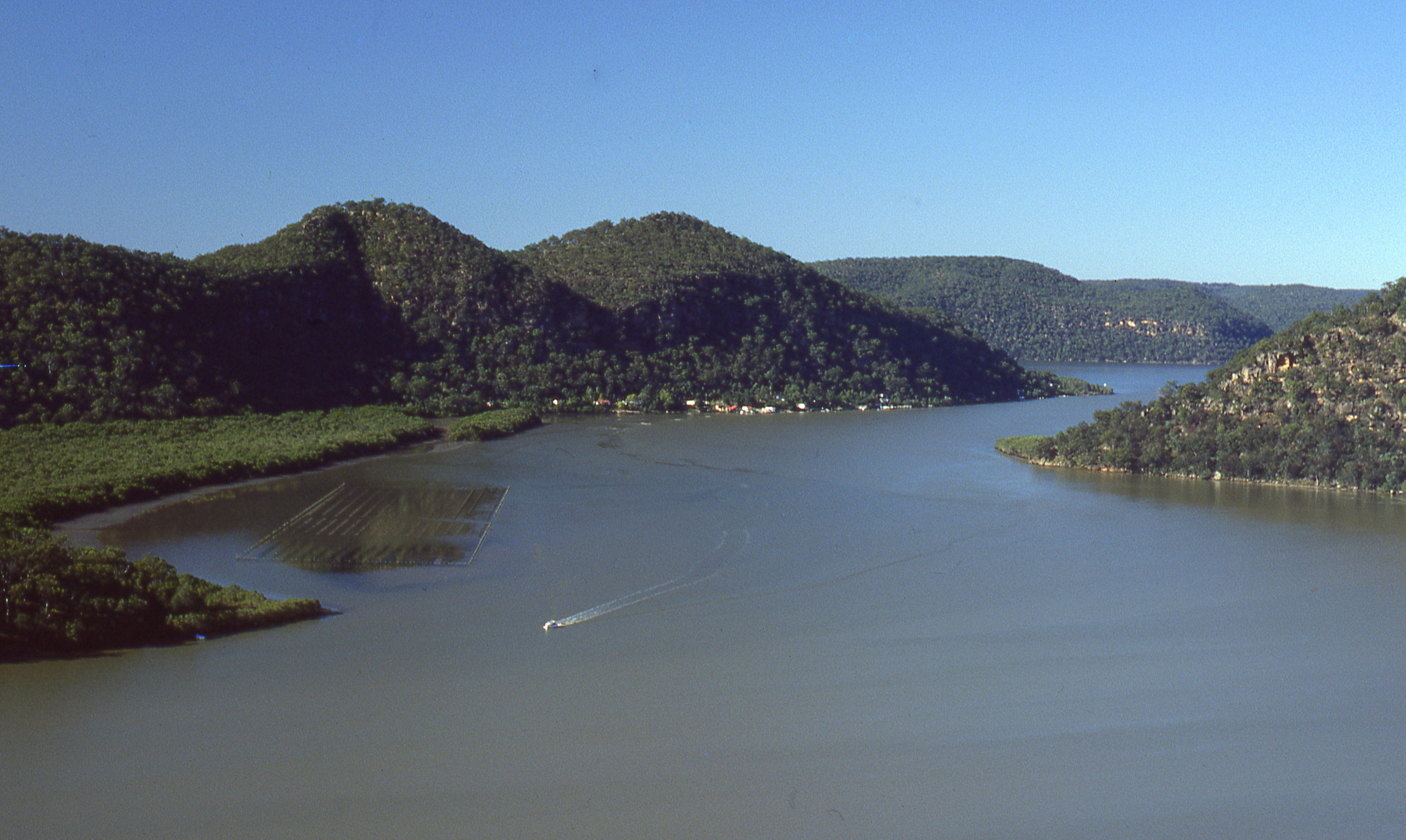
The Hawkesbury River, where Oyster Farmer was filmed

Reeves stated that she chose the area due to her 'love of the river's epic landscape' and its ability to attribute 'a sense of its vastness and isolation’ to the film. Reeves further justified her choice of filming location by stating that she was 'so struck by the beauty and drama of the Hawkesbury River, a place of remote and eccentric charm so close to the city, that she spent four years immersing herself in its culture, especially the lives of the oyster farmers' prior to filming. Paul Byrnes commented on Reeves’ choice, saying the chosen location ‘provides a serene and peaceful setting against which to contrast the inner turmoil and dramas of the characters who make their living from it’. The economic significance of the Hawkesbury River region to the film's narrative was also a factor in Reeves' selection, being one of the primary sites of oyster production and harvesting in New South Wales, with up to 23 permit holders farming within 400 hectares of oyster leases.

=== Filming ===
Filming took place in various locations within the Sydney and Hawkesbury River region, including Brooklyn and Wondabyne in the Hornsby Shire, as well as on the Hawkesbury River itself.

=== Post-production ===
Oyster Farmer enjoyed some free publicity, due to rumours that its star Alex O'Loughlin was a finalist for the recast role of James Bond in preparation for the development of Casino Royale. O'Loughlin reportedly screen tested for the role following the withdrawal of Pierce Brosnan in 2003, but the role eventually went to Daniel Craig.

== Release ==
=== Box office ===
Marking Reeves’ directorial debut, Oyster Farmer ran for approximately six months in Australia, grossing $2,383,051 by the second half of 2005. The film opened the Commonwealth Film Festival in Manchester in 2007, with Reeves presenting the film at the festival’s opening on 29 April 2007.

=== Critical reception ===
Oyster Farmer received generally mixed reviews from critics. The online reviews aggregate Rotten Tomatoes gave the film a rating of 52% based on 16 reviews, with an average rating of 5.7 out of 10. Metacritic gave the film a 51 out of 100 based on 8 reviews, consisting of both ‘mixed and average reviews’. IMDb gave Oyster Farmer a weighted average of 6.5 out of 10, based on 1,208 reviews.

Critics of Oyster Farmer generally focused on the accuracy of the characterisations and the substantiality of the script, generally forming positive, mixed, and negative accounts. Laura Kern of the New York Times claimed ‘this darkly humorous, sometimes even raunchy film mostly eludes a typical cutesy, feel-good formula’. Sean Axmaker of the Seattle Post-Intelligencer made a similar assessment, stating ‘at times it gets lost in the backwaters, but the eccentric characters and offbeat humour make it an entertaining detour’. The Sydney Morning Herald’s Doug Anderson chose to forefront the effectiveness of the chosen landscape, noting the landscape deserves co-star billing thanks to Alun Bollinger's cinematography.’. A positive outlook was expressed by Megan Spencer of SBS, who said ‘The characters are well drawn and authentic, and Reeves clearly had a ball fashioning the language of this film and the dialogue’. Sharon Hurst of Cinephilia wrote that ‘Although there is nothing remarkable to the plot, The Oyster Farmer looks feels fresh and original’. Frank Scheck of The Hollywood Reporter considered the film to be substantially lacking, commenting that it ‘fails to overcome its hokey script and cliched characterizations’. V.A Musetto of the New York Post took a similar approach, stating ‘While her cast is talented, Reeves doesn’t concentrate long enough on any plotline or character to build viewer interest’.

=== Accolades ===
Oyster Farmer was nominated for two AACTA awards (for Best Picture and Best Cinematography), two FCCA awards (for Best Cinematography and Best Actress in a Supporting Role (Kerry Armstrong)) and two IF awards (for Best Cinematography and Best Production Design).

== See also ==
- Cinema of Australia
