= Out of the Past (Moonlight) =

- Moonlight episode
- Mick St. John (Alex O'Loughlin) and Beth Turner (Sophia Myles).
- Episode no.: Season 1 Episode 2
- Directed by: Fred Toye
- Written by: David Greenwalt
- Original air date: October 5, 2007

Guest appearances
- Jordan Belfi as Josh Lindsey; Tami Roman as Marreen Williams; David Fabrizio as Lee Jay Spaulding

Episode chronology
← Previous "No Such Thing as Vampires"	Next → "Dr. Feelgood"

"Out of the Past" is the second episode of the first season of the American supernatural television drama Moonlight, which premiered on CBS on September 28, 2007 in the United States. It was written by David Greenwalt and directed by Fred Toye.

== Plot ==
Beth is reporting for BuzzWire about Lee Jay Spaulding, a criminal being released on parole after twenty-five years in prison. Many people believe that he did not commit the crime, including Beth's interview subject and friend Julia, who has written a book about Spaulding. At home, Mick is watching the report, and cannot believe that Spaulding is being released. In a flashback to 1983, Mick is shown being told that a woman he had been hired to protect had been found dead. The police believe it is a self-inflicted gunshot wound, but Mick knows Spaulding is responsible. Mick goes after Spaulding, biting a chunk out of his neck, but a detective shows up. Mick is forced to flee, and now Spaulding knows that Mick is a vampire. In the present day, Josef tells Mick that he needs to kill Spaulding before he kills Mick.

Beth dreams about her abduction as a child, and calls out Mick's name in her sleep. Beth is confused as to why she keeps on dreaming of Mick saving her, but her boyfriend Josh says it is probably because he saved her last week. Back at BuzzWire, Julia invites Beth to her book's release party, and shows her a copy. Beth is shocked because there is a picture of Mick in the book, and it seems Mick has not aged at all. Beth drops by Mick's apartment to give him a gift for saving her, but also shows him the picture. Mick tells Beth that it is his father, and that Spaulding's a killer. Meanwhile, Spaulding is shown gathering wooden stakes and forging vampire-killing weapons. Mick goes to visit Bobby, the detective from Spaulding's case. They discuss Spaulding's murderous ways, and Mick thinks that Julia is in danger. Bobby gives Mick a file on evidence they could not admit during the case and reminds him Mick needs to be careful. At the book party, Mick is shown placing a GPS under Julia's car. Mick is then introduced to Spaulding, while Beth detects the tension. After a speech about rising above challenges, Spaulding attacks Mick in the bathroom. Spaulding stabs a stake through Mick's heart, which paralyzes him, leaving him powerless. Spaulding smashes his own head through the window and cries for help, saying Mick attacked him. Spaulding refuses to press charges, which makes Mick and Beth argue about whether or not Spaulding is a killer.

Beth, not being able to find any evidence that Mick's father existed, goes to visit Bobby to find out more. He tells her that Mick is "one of a kind" and though he never had a son, he would have wanted him to be just like Mick. At Mick's apartment, Spaulding waits for him with a bag of Mick's store-bought blood. He congratulates Mick on being the only one to see through his reformed act, and shoots himself in the arm with Mick's gun. Mick quickly gathers up his blood stores and leaves. Mick meets with Josef, who tells him that he needs to dispose of Spaulding as quickly as possible. At home, Beth discusses the Mick situation with Josh. Mick shows up and tries to explain why he ran after Spaulding was shot. He tells Beth and Josh that he panicked, and that Spaulding shot himself. Beth believes Mick and shows Josh the evidence file from 1983. Then she sets up a streaming video feed for Mick on BuzzWire so Mick can proclaim his innocence to the internets and expose the evidence against Spaulding. Julia takes Spaulding home from the hospital, but is soon held hostage by Spaulding and his friends in a warehouse. Spaulding calls Mick and insists that Mick turn himself in, or Julia will be killed.

Mick and Beth track Julia's car by the GPS Mick planted earlier. He gives Beth a gun, and tells her to wait outside. When she is not looking, Mick jumps onto the roof. He tries to save Julia, but as she runs away, she sees him being shot by silver buckshot, which is like poison to vampires. As Spaulding fires up a blowtorch, Beth comes in and fatally shoots Spalding in the throat. The police arrive and take Spaulding's body away. Beth tells the police that she shot Spaulding, and then takes off. At his apartment, Mick drinks some blood trying to heal himself from the damage. Beth arrives, and he turns away, huddled on the floor as he begs her not to look at him. Beth asks why she keeps dreaming about him, and then gets close enough to see that Mick is holding a bag of blood, which is smeared on his face and hands. He still has his face angled away, but he finally turns to her, showing a shocked Beth his vampire visage and telling her what he is.

== Reception ==
"Out of the Past" was seen by 8.04 million American viewers, receiving a 5.2 household rating and a 9% share of all televisions in use.

Travis Fickett of IGN gave the episode a mainly negative review, giving it a 6.5 out of 10. He described the episode, and the series as a whole, as "vampire mediocrity with a slight hint of potential". He compared the episode to the television series Angel, saying it was "weaker on virtually every front". Jen Creer of TV Squad criticized the writing, but said she felt that Sophia Myles was doing a "decent job of developing her character and embracing the material". Carl Cortez of iFMagazine.com said this episode improved "leaps and bounds", and was a "step in the right direction". He gave the episode a 'C' rating, saying the direction was "lifeless" and the acting was "stilted".
