= Sullivan Canaday White =

Sullivan Canaday White (born February 8, 1966) is an American theater director, producer and educator in Lexington, Kentucky.

== Personal life ==
Sullivan Canaday White is a theater director, producer and educator in Lexington, Kentucky. Born on February 8, 1966, White attended primary and secondary schools in Estill County, Kentucky, and received a BA from the University of Kentucky (1988), an MA from Northwestern University (1995), and an MFA from Virginia Commonwealth University (2007).

== Teaching ==
White has taught acting at Kentucky Conservatory Theatre, North Carolina Theatre Conservatory for Performing Arts, Kentucky Governor's School for the Arts, Wofford College, and Actors Theatre of Louisville, where she was Director of the Apprentice/Intern Company from 1999 to 2001. White is an associate professor at Transylvania University and has been Program Director for Theater since 2010. White's Master's thesis, Training the Theatre Artist, was completed in 2007.

== Directing ==
White has directed primarily new and contemporary American plays in New York, Kentucky, Virginia and South Carolina. In 2002, her world premiere production of Sheri Wilner's Bake-Off was described by Bruce Weber, theatre critic for The New York Times, as "the clear apex of this year's...Humana Festival of New American Plays..." In 2005, Rich Copley of the Lexington Herald-Leader wrote, "Last night's world premier of celebrated Kentucky author Silas House's debut as a playwright was an unqualified theatrical event. The play was worth the fanfare, both in terms of the script and the production it was given by the University of Kentucky and director Sullivan Canaday White." And in 2015, Washington Post critic Jane Horwitz noted that playwright Ginna "Hoben and [director Sullivan Canaday] White have whipped up a funny, surprisingly raw show for grown-ups that, it should be noted, entertained the men in the audience equally well."

== Producing ==
In 2010, White launched a new theatre company, Project SEE, in Lexington with Ellie Clark and Evan Bergman. Her directorial credits with that company include boom, The 12 Dates of Christmas, Burn This, and Big Love. In 2016, Project SEE became the first professional resident theatre at Transylvania University with White's second production of No Spring Chicken.
