= Harry Werksman =

American television producer

Harry M. Werksman Jr. is an American television screenwriter and producer.

== Biography ==
Harry Werksman was born Pittsburgh and grew up in Palm Springs before leaving to attend St. George's School in Newport, Rhode Island.

He then attended Northwestern University and received a BA in history and political science. He is member of Pi Sigma Alpha, National Honorary Political Science Society, was awarded a Special Political Science Departmental Certificate in international relations and his honors thesis examined the historical roots of emerging capitalist economic systems in the sixteenth century.

Werksman then went on to New College, Oxford University, and graduated with a Master of Letters (M.Litt.) in modern history. His thesis was titled "Politics, Religion and Social Control in Wiltshire, 1603-1625". He was also the first American captain in the more than 150 year history of New College Boat Club.

After moving back to the United States, he shifted his focus away from academics working for Winner/Wagner & Associates, specializing in crisis management communications, and with Winner Wagner & Mandabach during the successful 1992 Martin Luther King Jr. Holiday campaign in Arizona where he developed speaker's kits and trained spokespeople.

During this time, Werksman was also a contributing writer to various publications, including: The LA Reader, Sci Fi Universe Magazine, Eon Magazine, Universal's 13thStreet and The Star Trek Fact Files. He also worked as a researcher for the Survivors of the Shoah Visual History Foundation before becoming a full-time writer.

Werksman has worked for over 25 years as a TV writer-producer. His credits include: Eon-4, Star Trek: DS9, V.I.P., Earth: Final Conflict, Farscape, The Invisible Man, Deathlands: Homeward Bound, Veritas: The Quest, Grey's Anatomy, Ugly Betty, Moonlight, Final Fantasy XV and Castle.

He has sold four original one-hour pilots - one of which was chosen by the Writers Guild of America as one of the best pilots in its 5th Annual Unproduced Television Scripts competition – and also taught screenwriting at both the American Film Institute's MFA Program, UCLA Extension – Writer's Program, New York Film Academy (Los Angeles) and NYU's Tisch School of the Arts.

Werksman has been nominated for two Emmys, one Golden Globe, one Saturn Award, one People's Choice Award and three WGA Awards. He won a WGA Award for Grey's Anatomy, a Golden Globe for Ugly Betty, and both a People's Choice Award and a Saturn Award for Moonlight.

He currently lives in Santa Fe, New Mexico with his wife Amanda Cook Werksman.
