= Alex O'Loughlin =

Australian actor (born 1976)

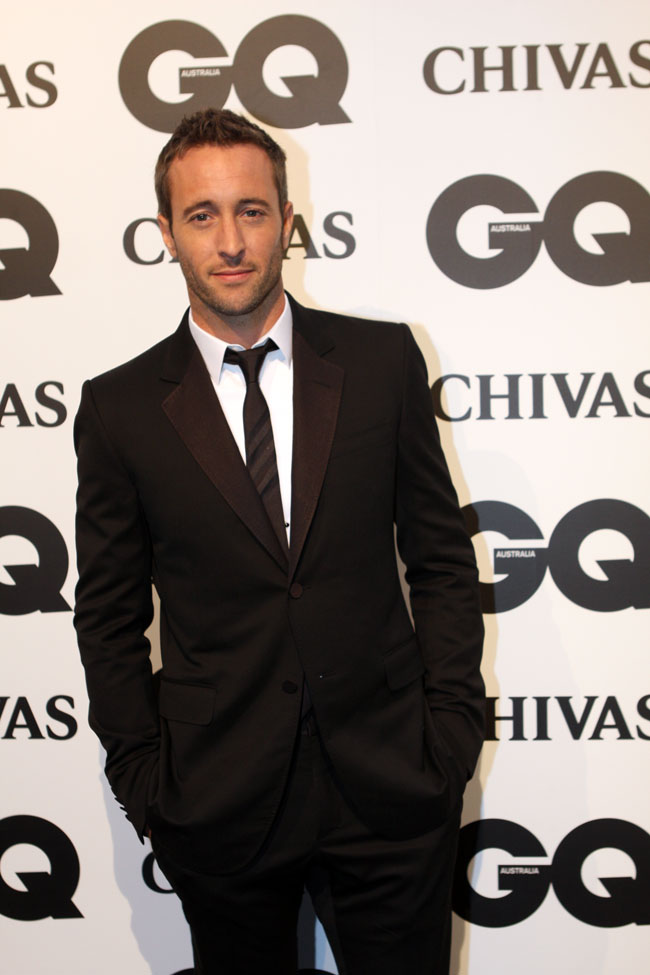
- O'Loughlin at the 2011 GQ Men of the Year Awards
- Born: 24 August 1976 (age 50); Canberra, Australian Capital Territory, Australia
- Occupations: Actor; writer; director; producer
- Years active: 2001–2020
- Spouse: Malia Jones (m. 2014)
- Children: 2

Alex O'Loughlin (born 24 August 1976) is a retired Australian actor. He is known for his portrayal of Lieutenant Commander Steve McGarrett on CBS' remake of the TV series Hawaii Five-0 (2010–2020). He had starring roles in the films Oyster Farmer (2004) and The Back-up Plan (2010), as well as on such television series as Moonlight (2007–2008) and Three Rivers (2009–2010).

Born in Canberra, O'Loughlin was educated at the National Institute of Dramatic Art (NIDA) in Sydney.

== Early life ==
O'Loughlin was born on 24 August 1976, in Canberra, Australia. He is of Irish and Scottish descent. His father is a physics and astronomy teacher in Sydney and his mother is a nurse.

O'Loughlin has stated that he had "a bit of OCD" as a child. He enrolled at the National Institute of Dramatic Art (NIDA) in Sydney in 1999 and graduated in June 2002 after completing a three-year, full-time Bachelor of Dramatic Art program.

== Career ==
O'Loughlin began working in short films and fringe theatre as a teenager in Sydney. One of his first acting jobs was an extra in a commercial, playing a marine. After graduating from NIDA, he began his career in Australian television and film productions. Some of his TV credits include roles in BlackJack: Sweet Science, Love Bytes and White Collar Blue.

In 2004, he landed his first film role, the lead in Oyster Farmer. He later appeared in Man-Thing, Feed, and in the Australian miniseries The Incredible Journey of Mary Bryant, for which he was nominated as Best Lead Actor in Television from the Australian Film Institute Awards in 2005 and as Most Outstanding Actor in a Drama Series from the Logie Awards in 2006. O'Loughlin joined the cast of The Shield in 2007 as Detective Kevin Hiatt, the newest member of the strike team.

In 2005, he screen-tested for the film role of James Bond. As he told one interviewer: "I met with [director] Martin Campbell here in Los Angeles at his office on the Sony [Pictures] lot and he asked me to fly to London and test and we tested at Pinewood [Studios]. It was the biggest screen test I've ever done. It was very comprehensive. I had tuxedos and suits cut for it and hair cuts."

He left The Shield in 2007 after he won the lead role on the CBS series Moonlight, where he played private investigator and vampire Mick St. John. The filming of Moonlight was interrupted by the Hollywood writers strike. There was speculation that the series would be dropped but fan pressure prevailed and the show was given four additional episodes to try to regain its audience share. Despite it being the highest rated show in its Friday evening slot, CBS did not commission a second season. After its cancellation, a fan-based charity campaign to win a second-season renewal for Moonlight by holding blood drives proved unsuccessful.

In August 2008, CBS signed a talent development deal with O'Loughlin as the star of a TV series to be developed by writer Mark Gordon, but it did not materialise. He was cast in the lead role of the CBS hospital drama Three Rivers, developed by producer Carol Barbee, which aired Sunday evenings in the 2009–2010 season.

In April 2009, he guest-starred in an episode of Criminal Minds in the season 4 episode, "The Big Wheel", as an OCD-ridden serial killer, Vincent Rowlings. In December 2009, CBS pulled Three Rivers from its schedule. O'Loughlin starred alongside Jennifer Lopez in the 2010 romantic comedy film The Back-up Plan.

O'Loughlin was cast in the CBS remake of Hawaii Five-0 portraying Lieutenant Commander Steve McGarrett, which premiered on 20 September 2010. The show won "Favorite New TV Drama" at the 2010–11 People's Choice Awards. Subsequently, BuddyTV ranked him #2 on its "TV's 100 Sexiest Men of 2010" list and #9 in 2011.

On 2 March 2012, CBS announced that O'Loughlin would miss shooting some episodes of Hawaii Five-0 to seek drug treatment related to pain management medication prescribed after a shoulder injury. He was slated to miss at least one episode from the second season.

In August 2013, the Los Angeles–based non-profit Australians in Film announced that O'Loughlin would be honored with a Breakthrough Award at a ceremony held on 24 October 2013 in Los Angeles.

Hawaii Five-0's stunts left O'Loughlin battling numerous injuries, to include herniated discs in his neck, nerve damage, torn shoulder muscles, and torn bicep tendons. In 2018 he almost quit the show after a spinal injury. O'Loughlin eventually filmed 10 seasons before announcing his desire to leave due to ongoing injuries. Producers considered replacing him, before cancelling the show in 2020.

== Personal life ==
O'Loughlin's first son, Saxon, was born in 1997, to a girlfriend from whom he has since separated. In 2005, he began dating actress/singer Holly Valance. They separated in February 2009.

He has a second son Lion born in 2012 with model and surfer Malia Jones. O'Loughlin and Jones married in Hawaii on 18 April 2014. He became a stepfather to Jones's son Spike from her previous relationship.

He took on the role of ambassador for Donate Life America in 2009.

O'Loughlin is an experienced practitioner of Brazilian Jiu-Jitsu, training alongside his Hawaii Five-0 co-star Scott Caan and MMA veteran Egan Inoue. At the 2022 ADCC World Championship, O'Loughlin was promoted to black belt in the martial art in front of the crowd in attendance.

== Filmography ==
=== Film ===
Year	Title	Role
2004	Oyster Farmer	Jack Flange
2005	Man-Thing	Eric Fraser
2005	Feed	Michael Carter
2006	The Holiday	Kissing Couple
2007	The Invisible	Marcus Bohem
2007	August Rush	Marshall Connelly
2009	Whiteout	Russell Haden
2010	The Back-up Plan	Stan

=== Television ===
Year	Title	Role	Notes
2003	White Collar Blue	Ian Mack	Episode: "2:01"
2004	Love Bytes	Dave	Episode: "Net Nanny"
2004	Black Jack: Sweet Science	Luke Anderson	Television film
2005	The Incredible Journey of Mary Bryant	Will Bryant	Miniseries; Nominated‍—‌Australian Film Institute Award for Best Lead Actor in Television (2005); Nominated‍—‌Logie Award for Most Outstanding Actor in a Drama Series (2006)
2007	The Shield	Kevin Hiatt	7 episodes
2007–2008	Moonlight	Mick St. John	Won‍—‌People's Choice Award for Best Drama Series (2007–2008)
2009	Criminal Minds	Vincent Rowlings	Episode: "The Big Wheel"
2009–2010	Three Rivers	Dr. Andy Yablonski	13 episodes
2010–2020	Hawaii Five-0	Lieutenant Commander Steve McGarrett	Main role Won‍—‌People's Choice Award for Best New TV Drama (2010–2011); Also served as director (3 episodes, 2018–2019), writer (2 episodes, 2018–2019), and producer (2019–2020)

== Awards ==
Year	Award	Category	Work nominated	Result
2005	AFI Award	Best Lead Actor in Television	The Incredible Journey of Mary Bryant	Nominated
2006	Silver Logie Award	Most Outstanding Actor in a Drama Series	The Incredible Journey of Mary Bryant	Nominated
2013	Australians in Film Breakthrough Award	For International Success	Career	Won
