= SDX =

SDX or sdx may refer to:

- SDX, the IATA code for Sedona Airport, Arizona, United States
- SDX, the station code for Sidki railway station, Pakistan
- sdx, the ISO 639-3 code for Sibu Melanau language, Malaysia and Brunei
- Sadako DX, a 2022 Japanese supernatural comedy film
- Serdexmethylphenidate, prodrug of dexmethylphenidate
