= Sedona, Arizona =

City in Coconino and Yavapai counties, Arizona, US

- City
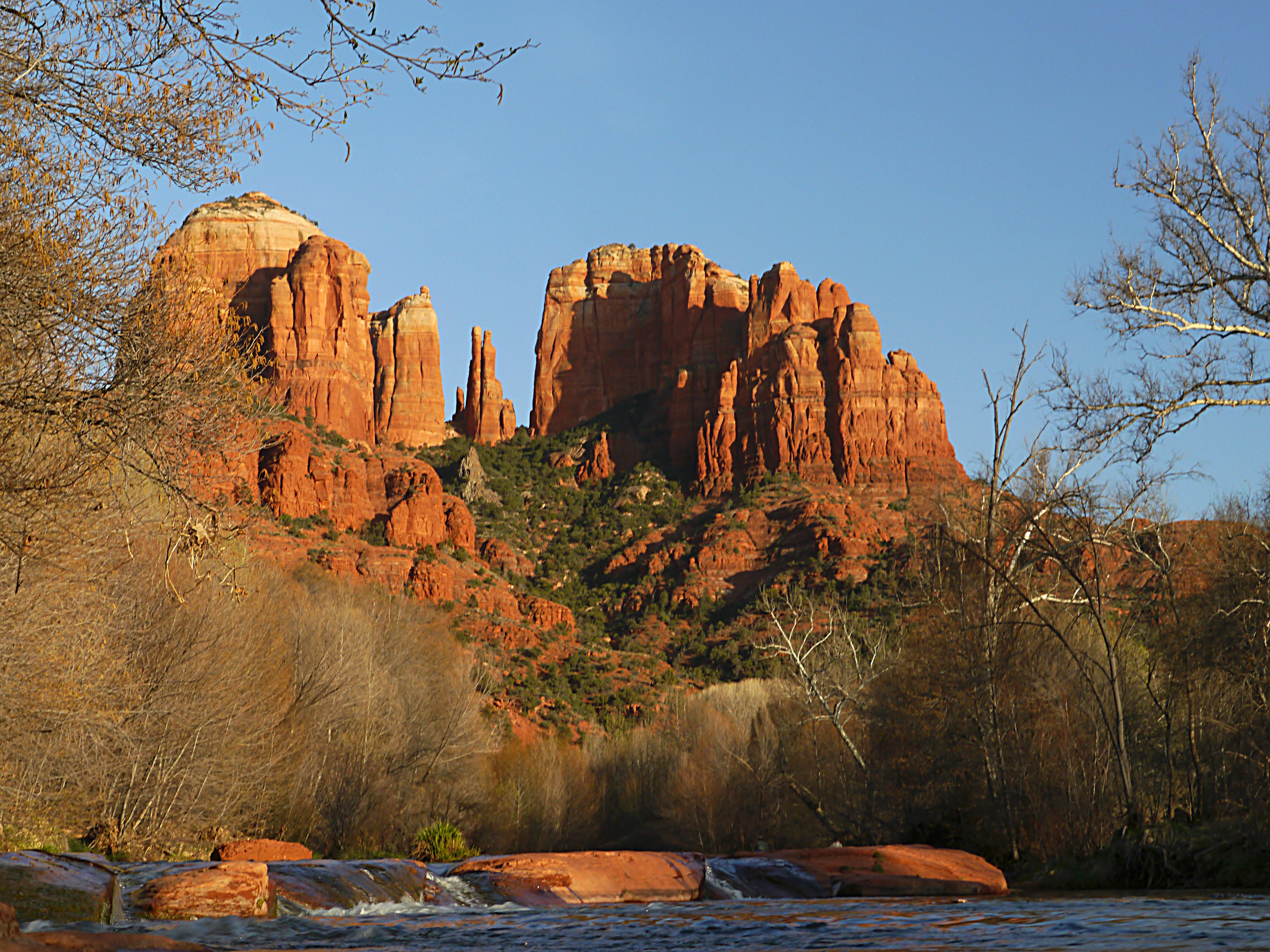
- Cathedral Rock

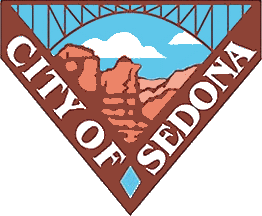
- Flag Seal
- Location of Sedona in Coconino County and Yavapai County, Arizona
- Location of Sedona Sedona (the United States)
- Coordinates: 34°52′11″N 111°45′40″W
- Country: United States
- State: Arizona
- Counties: Yavapai, Coconino
- Founded: 1902
- Incorporated: 1988

Government
  - Type: Council–Manager

Area
  - Total: 18.31 sq mi (47.41 km^{2})
  - Land: 18.26 sq mi (47.30 km^{2})
  - Water: 0.042 sq mi (0.11 km^{2})
- Elevation: 4,360 ft (1,330 m)

Population (2020)
  - Total: 9,684
  - Density: 530.3/sq mi (204.75/km^{2})
- Time zone: UTC−07:00 (MST)
- ZIP Code: 86336
- Area code: 928
- FIPS code: 04-65350
- GNIS feature ID: 2411858
- Website: www.sedonaaz.gov

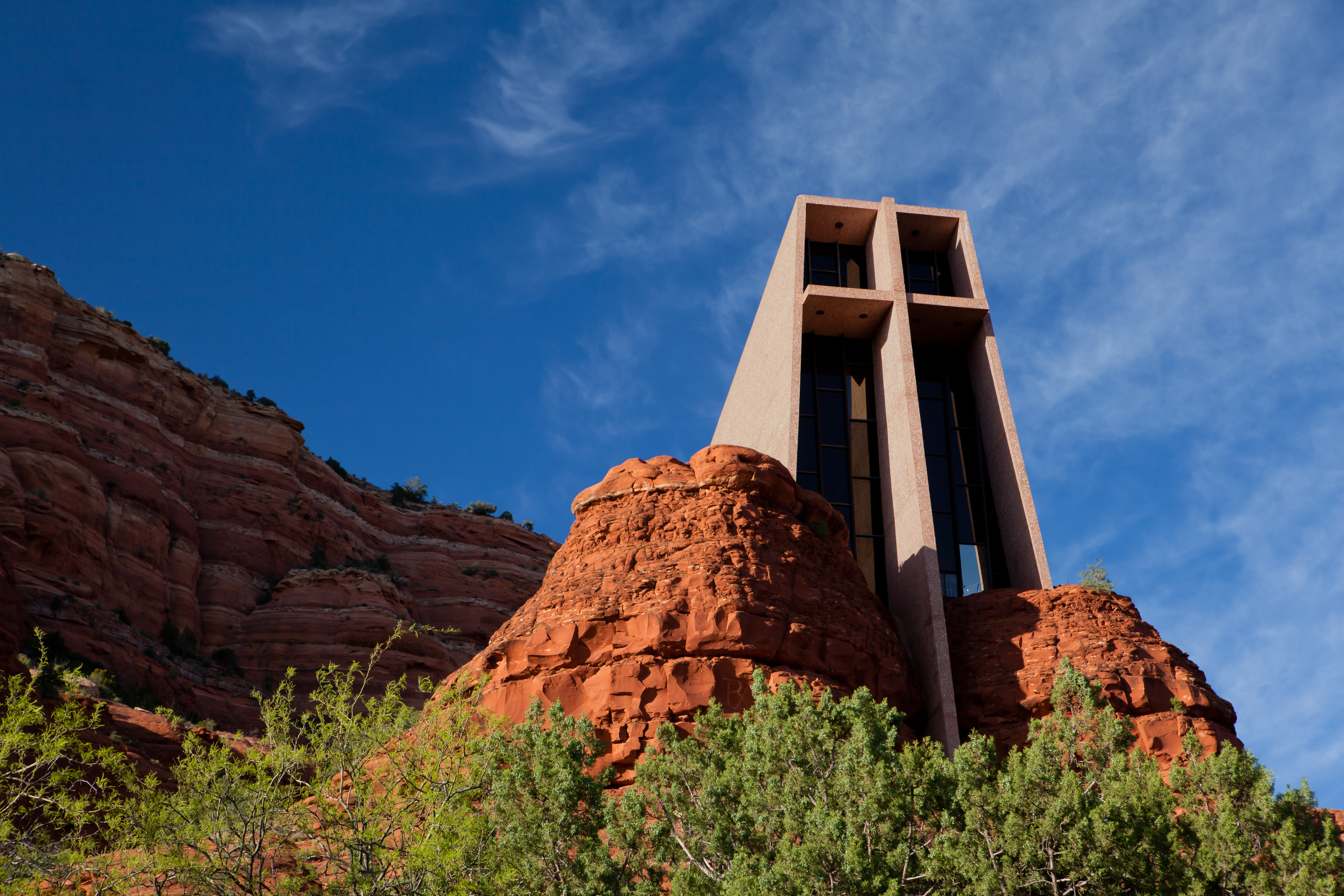
The Chapel of the Holy Cross

Sedona (/sɪˈdoʊnə/ si-DOH-nə) is a city straddling the county line between Coconino and Yavapai counties in the northern Verde Valley region of Arizona, United States. As of the 2020 census, Sedona had a population of 9,684. The city is within the Coconino National Forest.

Sedona's main attraction is its array of pink sandstone formations. The formations appear to glow in pink when illuminated by the rising or setting sun. The pink rocks form a popular backdrop for many activities, ranging from spiritual pursuits to the hundreds of hiking and mountain-biking trails.

Sedona is named for Sedona Schnebly, whose husband, Theodore Carlton Schnebly, was the city's first postmaster. She was celebrated for her hospitality and industriousness. Her mother, Amanda Miller, claimed to have made the name up because "it sounded pretty".

== History ==
=== Anglo-American settlement ===
The first European-American settler, John J. Thompson, moved to Oak Creek Canyon in 1876, an area well known for its peach and apple orchards. The early settlers were farmers and ranchers. In 1902, when the Sedona post office was established, there were 55 residents. In the mid-1950s, the first telephone directory listed 155 names. Some parts of the Sedona area were not electrified until the 1960s.

The area, then unincorporated, had no local government and was bisected by two counties. Growth increased after a resident discovered water. That meant area residents no longer had to transport water, and could directly build infrastructure.

Sedona began to develop as a tourist destination, vacation-home and retirement center in the 1950s. Most of the development seen today was constructed in the 1980s and 1990s. As of 2007, there are no large tracts of undeveloped land remaining.

=== Chapel of the Holy Cross ===
In 1956, construction of the Chapel of the Holy Cross was completed. The chapel rises 70 feet (21 m) out of a 1,000-foot (300 m) redrock cliff. The most prominent feature of the chapel is the cross. Later a chapel was added. Inside the chapel there is a window and a cross with benches and pews.

=== Cinematic legacy ===
Sedona played host to more than sixty Hollywood productions from the first years of movies into the 1970s. Stretching as far back as 1923, Sedona's pink rocks were a fixture in major Hollywood productions – including films such as Angel and the Badman, Desert Fury, Blood on the Moon, Johnny Guitar, The Last Wagon, 3:10 to Yuma and Broken Arrow. However, the surroundings typically were identified to audiences as the terrain of Texas, California, Nevada, and even Canada–US border territory. The town lent its name to the 2011 film Sedona, which is set in the community. Additionally, HIM, a film exploring the “reality” of reality dating television, was shot entirely in Sedona in 2023, and made its premiere at the Sedona International Film Festival in 2024.

=== Brins Fire ===
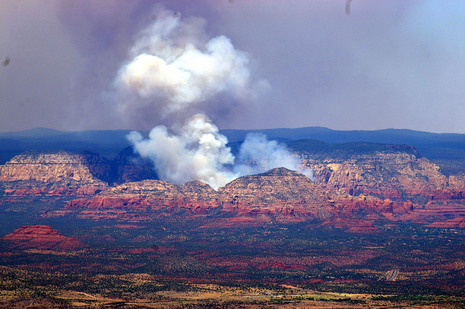
The Brins Fire of 2006

On June 18, 2006, a wildfire, reportedly started by campers, began about 1 mile (2 km) north of Sedona. The Brins Fire covered 4,317 acres (17 km^{2}) on Brins Mesa, Wilson Mountain and in Oak Creek Canyon before the US Forest Service declared it 100 percent contained on June 28. Containment cost was estimated at $6.4 million.

=== Slide Fire ===
On May 20, 2014, a wildfire started from an unknown cause began north of Sedona at Slide Rock State Park. The Slide Fire spread across 21,227 acres (86 km^{2}) in Oak Creek Canyon over nine days and prompted evacuations. State Route 89A opened to Flagstaff in June, but all parking and canyon access was closed to the public until October 1, 2014.

== Geography ==
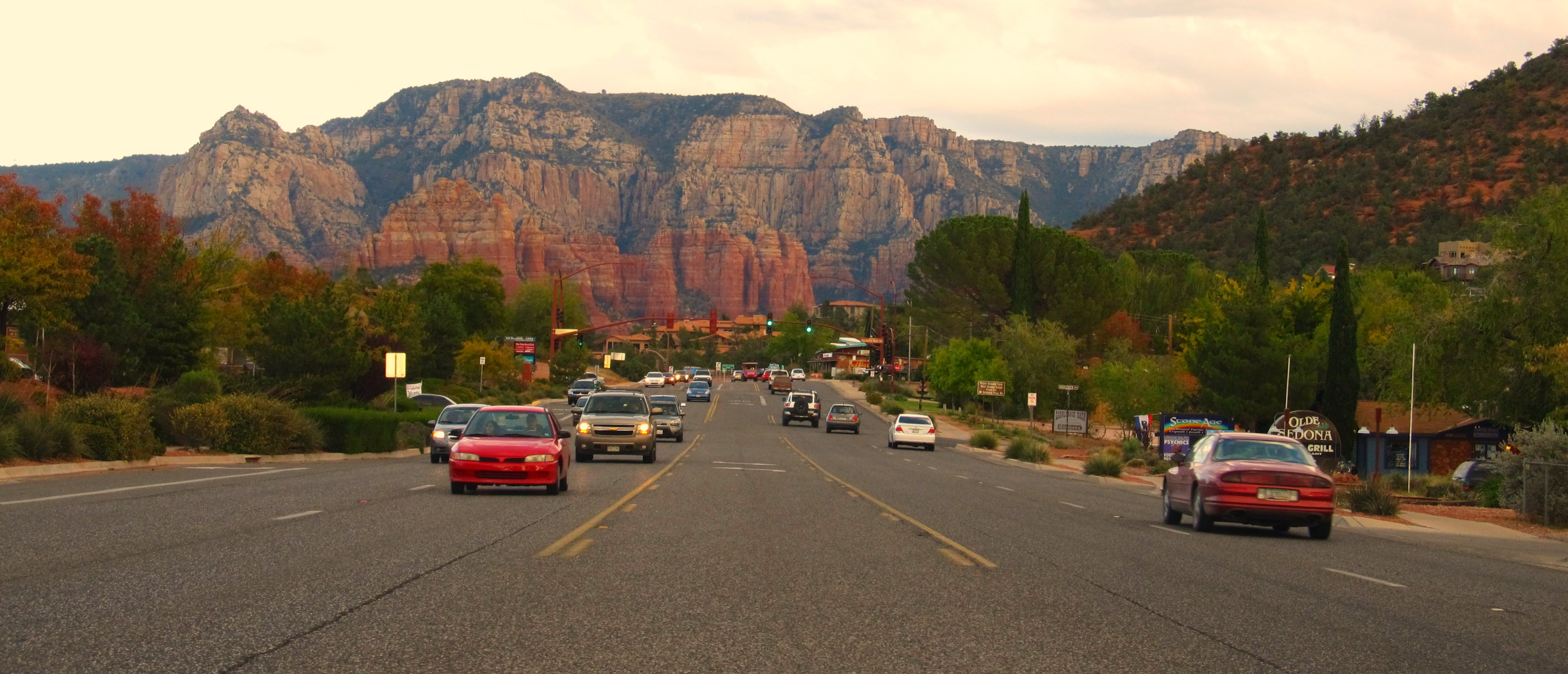
West Sedona – Route 89A

Sedona is located in the interior chaparral, semi-desert grassland, Great Basin conifer woodland biomes of northern Arizona. Sedona has mild winters and warm summers.

According to the United States Census Bureau, the city has a total area of 19.2 square miles (49.7 km^{2}) of which 0.04 square miles (0.1 km^{2}), or 0.22%, is water.

=== Flora ===
Sedona’s interior chaparral has many shrubs and small tree species of Quercus turbinella and Rhus ovata and a large population of Quercus palmeri. The Great Basin woodland has many small to medium trees of Pinus monophylla Var. fallax, Juniperus arizonica, Juniperus deppeana, Juniperus osteosperma, and Juniperus monosperma and a large population of Cupressus glabra. At higher elevations in Oak Creek Canyon Juniperus virginiana, Pinus edulis and other pines occur.

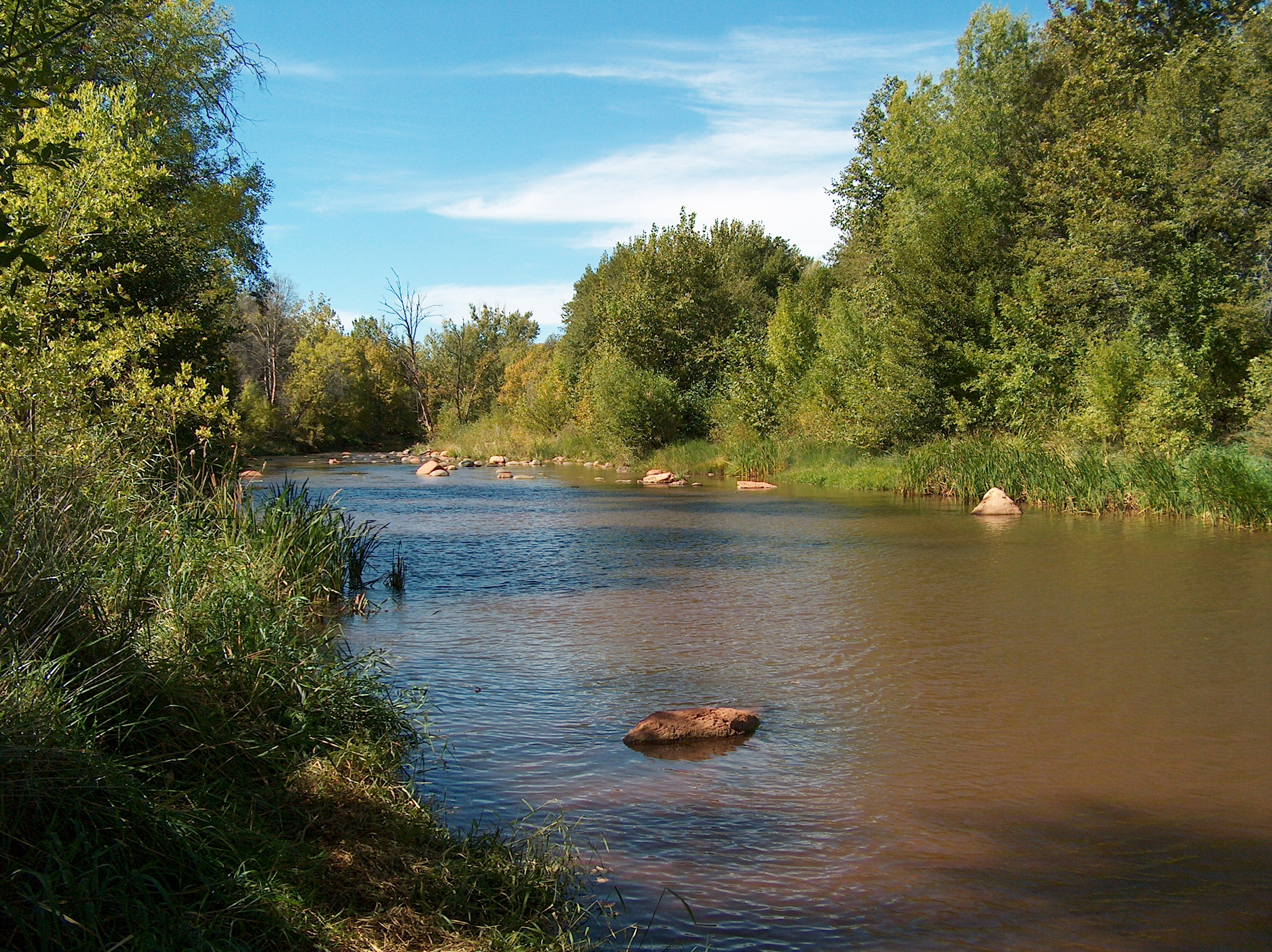
Oak Creek

=== Geology ===
The pink rocks of Sedona are formed by a unique layer of rock known as the Schnebly Hill Formation. The Schnebly Hill Formation is a thick layer of pink colored sandstone found only in the Sedona vicinity. The sandstone, a member of the Supai Group, was deposited during the Permian Period. Notable landforms in or around Sedona include the Seven Sacred Pools, Bell Rock, Capitol Butte, Cathedral Rock, Courthouse Butte, Devil's Kitchen Sinkhole, House Mountain, Two Nuns, and Wilson Mountain which is the highest.

=== Climate ===
Sedona has a cold semi-arid climate (BSk) and is a high desert. In January, the average high temperature is 58.3 °F (14.6 °C) with a low of 34.0 °F (1.1 °C). In July, the average high temperature is 96.9 °F (36.1 °C) with a low of 67.6 °F (19.8 °C). Annual precipitation is just over 17 inches (430 mm).

Climate data for Sedona, Arizona (1991–2020 normals, extremes 1943–2010)
Month	Jan	Feb	Mar	Apr	May	Jun	Jul	Aug	Sep	Oct	Nov	Dec	Year
Mean daily maximum °F (°C)	58.3 (14.6)	61.3 (16.3)	67.5 (19.7)	74.7 (23.7)	83.7 (28.7)	94.1 (34.5)	96.9 (36.1)	94.2 (34.6)	88.8 (31.6)	78.7 (25.9)	66.9 (19.4)	57.8 (14.3)	76.9 (25.0)
Daily mean °F (°C)	46.2 (7.9)	48.8 (9.3)	53.7 (12.1)	59.4 (15.2)	68.4 (20.2)	77.7 (25.4)	82.3 (27.9)	80.6 (27.0)	75.1 (23.9)	64.8 (18.2)	53.9 (12.2)	45.3 (7.4)	63.0 (17.2)
Mean daily minimum °F (°C)	34.0 (1.1)	36.2 (2.3)	39.8 (4.3)	44.0 (6.7)	53.2 (11.8)	61.2 (16.2)	67.6 (19.8)	66.9 (19.4)	61.4 (16.3)	51.0 (10.6)	40.9 (4.9)	32.8 (0.4)	49.1 (9.5)
Average precipitation inches (mm)	2.04 (52)	2.17 (55)	1.94 (49)	0.77 (20)	0.68 (17)	0.16 (4.1)	1.62 (41)	2.04 (52)	1.72 (44)	1.38 (35)	1.12 (28)	1.48 (38)	17.12 (435.1)
Average precipitation days (≥ 0.01 in)	5.5	5.6	5.8	3.3	2.7	1.4	6.4	9.0	4.7	3.3	3.4	3.8	54.9
Source: NOAA

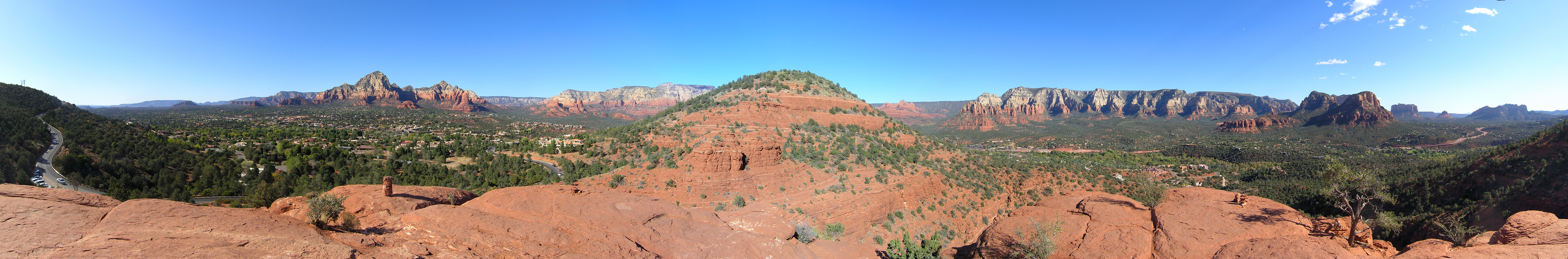
Panoramic view of Sedona from Airport Mesa. Bell Rock is located on the right side of the photo. Major parts of the town are in the middle of the photo. Capitol Butte is to the left.

== Demographics ==
Historical population
Census	Pop.	Note	%±
1970	2,022		—
1980	5,481		171.1%
1990	7,720		40.9%
2000	10,192		32.0%
2010	10,031		−1.6%
2020	9,684		−3.5%
U.S. Decennial Census

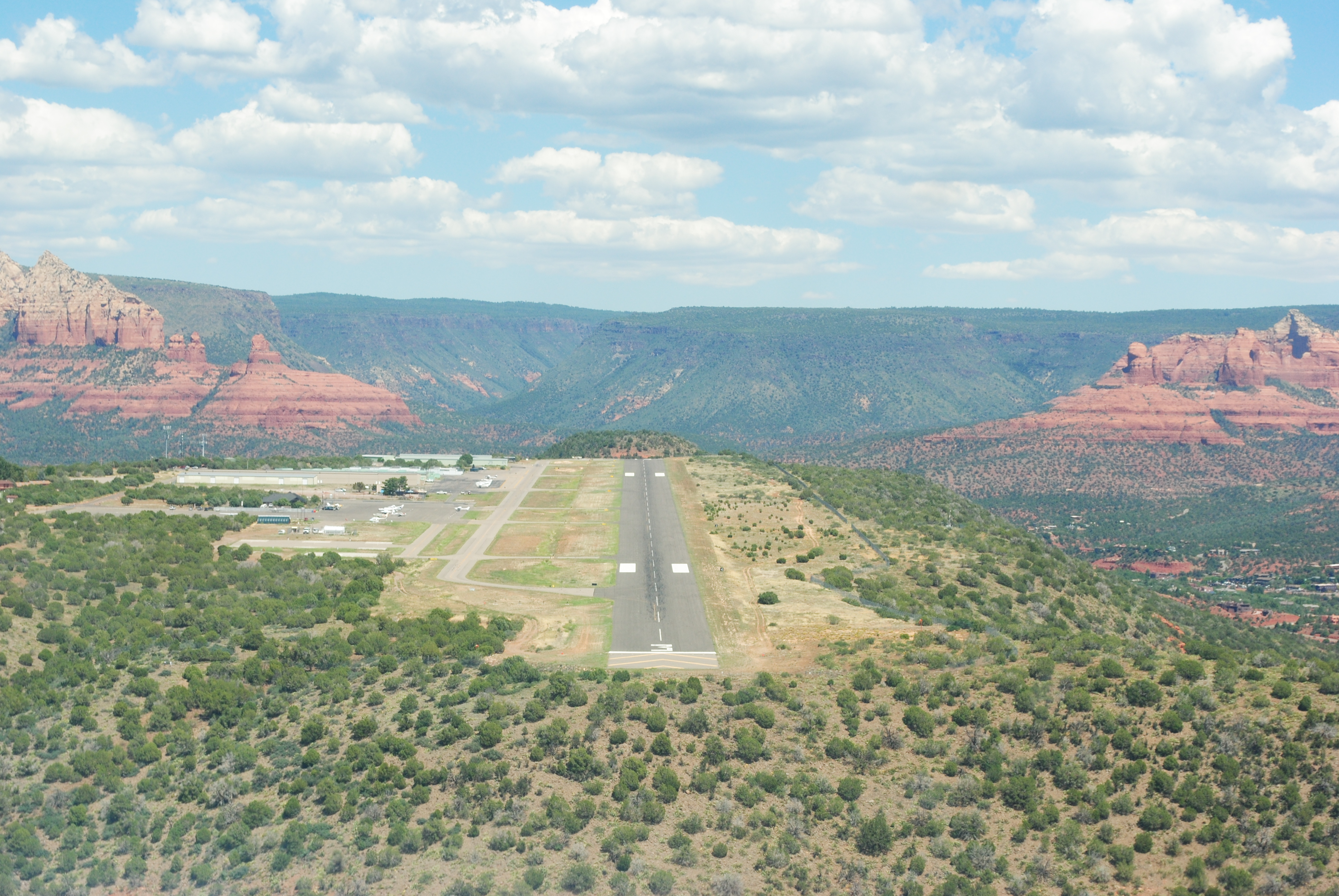
Sedona Airport viewed from the south, showing its location atop Airport Mesa

=== Racial and ethnic composition ===
Sedona city, Arizona – Racial composition
Race (NH = Non-Hispanic)	2020	2010	2000	1990	1980
White alone (NH)	80% (7,750)	81.6% (8,181)	88% (8,967)	93.7% (7,231)	97.9% (5,368)
Black alone (NH)	0.5% (50)	0.5% (46)	0.5% (49)	0.3% (21)	0% (0)
American Indian alone (NH)	0.5% (49)	0.5% (49)	0.4% (45)	0.3% (25)	0.5% (29)
Asian alone (NH)	2.4% (230)	1.8% (182)	0.9% (95)	0.5% (36)	0.4% (22)
Pacific Islander alone (NH)	0% (2)	0.1% (7)	0.1% (9)		
Other race alone (NH)	0.6% (58)	0.1% (15)	0.1% (7)	0% (2)	0% (0)
Multiracial (NH)	3.4% (332)	1.1% (113)	1.1% (113)	—	—
Hispanic/Latino (any race)	12.5% (1,213)	14.3% (1,438)	8.9% (907)	5.2% (405)	1.1% (62)

=== 2020 census ===
As of the 2020 census, Sedona had a population of 9,684. The median age was 62.6 years. 8.3% of residents were under the age of 18 and 43.7% of residents were 65 years of age or older. For every 100 females there were 88.1 males, and for every 100 females age 18 and over there were 87.1 males age 18 and over.

94.9% of residents lived in urban areas, while 5.1% lived in rural areas.

There were 4,997 households in Sedona, of which 11.1% had children under the age of 18 living in them. Of all households, 46.0% were married-couple households, 17.3% were households with a male householder and no spouse or partner present, and 29.9% were households with a female householder and no spouse or partner present. About 34.1% of all households were made up of individuals and 19.3% had someone living alone who was 65 years of age or older.

There were 6,671 housing units, of which 25.1% were vacant. The homeowner vacancy rate was 1.8% and the rental vacancy rate was 7.1%.

=== 2000 census ===
As of the census of 2000, there were 10,192 people, 4,928 households, and 2,863 families residing in the city. The population density was 548.0 inhabitants per square mile (211.6/km^{2}). There were 5,684 housing units at an average density of 305.6 per square mile (118.0/km^{2}). The racial makeup of the city was 92.2% White, 0.5% Black or African American, 0.5% Native American, 0.9% Asian, 0.1% Pacific Islander, 4.3% from other races, and 1.6% from two or more races. 8.9% of the population were Hispanic or Latino of any race.

At the 2000 census there were 7,229 people living in the Yavapai County (western) portion of the city (70.9% of its population) and 2,963 living in the Coconino County (eastern) portion (29.1%). By land area Yavapai had 66.2% of its area, versus 33.8% for Coconino.

There were 4,928 households, out of which 15.8% had children under the age of 18 living with them, 48.6% were married couples living together, 6.6% had a female householder with no husband present, and 41.9% were non-families. 32.2% of all households were made up of individuals, and 14.2% had someone living alone who was 65 years of age or older. The average household size was 2.06 and the average family size was 2.52.

In the city, 13.7% of the population was under the age of 18, 4.5% was from 18 to 24, 21.2% from 25 to 44, 35.0% from 45 to 64, and 25.6% was 65 years of age or older. The median age was 50 years. For every 100 females, there were 88.1 males. For every 100 females age 18 and over, there were 85.9 males.

The median income for a household in the city was $44,042, and the median income for a family was $52,659. Males had a median income of $32,067 versus $24,453 for females. The per capita income for the city was $31,350. About 4.7% of families and 9.7% of the population were below the poverty line, including 12.1% of those under age 18 and 5.0% of those age 65 or over.

== Arts and culture ==
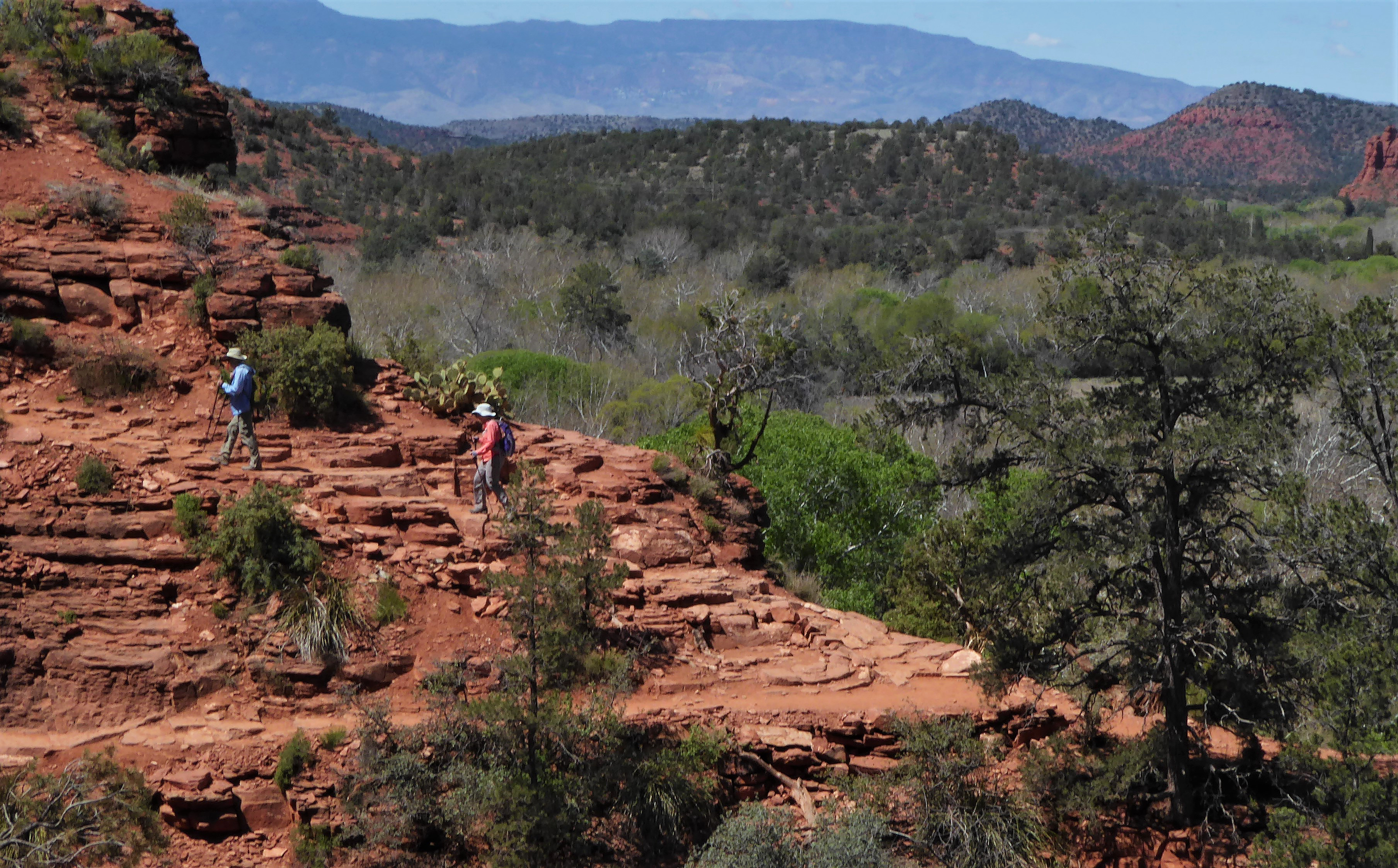
Hiking above Oak Creek, facing south

Annual events include:

- St. Patrick's Day parade, Celebration of Spring, Sedona Food Truck Festival, Red Dirt Concerts, Pumpkin Splash, and WagFest and Fair.
- Sedona Marathon.
- Sedona Miracle Annual Charity Fundraiser.
- Sedona Hummingbird Festival.
- The Sedona Solstice Festivals (summer and winter) at Unity of Sedona.

Arts organizations include:

- Chamber Music Sedona chamber-music program.
- Sedona Arts Center, founded in 1958, the oldest arts center in northern Arizona.
- Sedona International Film Festival, established in 1995.
- Greg Lawson Galleries.

A New Age tourist industry operates in Sedona, where José Arguelles organized the "Harmonic Convergence" in 1987. Some New Age proponents purport that "spiritual vortices" are concentrated in the Sedona area at Bell Rock, Airport Mesa, Cathedral Rock, and Boynton Canyon. The Sedona Wetlands Preserve is a popular area for birding.

== Government ==
Politically, Uptown Sedona, the Gallery District and the Chapel area (all in Coconino County) and West Sedona (in Yavapai County) form the City of Sedona. Founded in 1902, it was incorporated as a city in 1988. The unincorporated Village of Oak Creek, 7 miles (11 km) to the south and well outside the Sedona city limits, is a significant part of the Sedona community.

In 2013, Sedona became one of the Arizona municipalities to approve of civil unions for same-sex partners.

== Education ==
Sedona is in the Sedona-Oak Creek Unified School District. West Sedona School (Sedona-Oak Creek USD), serving grades K–6, is located at 570 Posse Ground Road. Sedona Red Rock High School (SRRHS), built in 1994, is located on the western edge of town in West Sedona. The school's mascot is the Scorpion. The high school's new campus, a series of single-story buildings, is located opposite the Sedona campus of Yavapai College. As of 2016, Sedona Red Rock High School holds grades 7–8 in the Junior High portion of campus.

Prior to the establishment of Sedona-Oak Creek USD, Flagstaff Unified School District included Sedona and operated the Sedona School. In the pre-1991 period some Sedona-area students attended Cottonwood-Oak Creek Elementary School District and Mingus Union High School District. The Sedona school district opened in 1991, taking territory and assets from Flagstaff USD. At the time, Sedona students continued to attend Flagstaff for high school.

Red Rock Early Learning Center is a year-round Preschool program designed for children aged 3–5 years old. Their normal school year runs from August to May each year, with a summer session offered during June and July. It is licensed by the ADHS, and located in West Sedona Elementary School building 300.

Verde Valley School, a boarding International Baccalaureate high school with many international students, is located between the Village of Oak Creek and Red Rock Crossing. It hosts numerous 'traditions' and performances open to the community. Their mascot is the coyote. Total attendance measures about 120 students per year, grades 9–12. Oscar-winning composer James Horner studied there (Titanic, Braveheart, Avatar, Legends of The Fall).

Sedona Charter School (SCS) is located behind the Sedona Public Library, serving as a Montessori-based school for grades K–8.

Yavapai College's Sedona Center for Arts & Technology includes the Sedona Film School, which offers certificates in independent filmmaking, the Business Partnership Program, the Osher Lifelong Learning Institute, and the University of Arizona Mini Med School.

== Infrastructure ==
=== Transportation ===
Sedona Airport is a non-towered general aviation airport located within the city limits. The nearest commercial airports are Flagstaff Pulliam Airport (26 miles (42 km) away), Prescott Regional Airport (68 miles (109 km) away), and Phoenix Sky Harbor International Airport (119 miles (192 km) away).

=== Healthcare ===
Verde Valley Medical Center – Sedona Campus is an outpatient facility providing 24/7 emergency services, cancer services, and primary and specialty healthcare to the Sedona/Oak Creek area. The facility is part of the Northern Arizona Healthcare system and is a subdivision of Verde Valley Medical Center in the nearby city of Cottonwood.

=== Cemeteries ===
Sedona's oldest burial ground is the Schuerman–Red Rock Cemetery, dating from 1893. Another pioneer cemetery is the Cooks Cedar Gate Cemetery, with an initial burial in 1918. The Sedona Community Cemetery, also known as Sedona Memorial Park, is on Pine Drive.

== Notable people ==
- Robert Adams – American Advaita teacher
- Samaire Armstrong – actress
- Michelle Branch – singer/songwriter
- Brandon Decker – singer/songwriter based in Sedona
- Gail Edwards – actress
- Max Ernst – surrealist and dadaist artist, brought international art world attention to Sedona when it was less than 100 people.
- Justin Frankel – computer programmer
- Kevin Geary – English portrait and abstract artist
- Steve George – musician/songwriter (Mr. Mister)
- James Gregory – television actor
- James Horner – film composer (studied at the Verde Valley School in the 1970s)
- Greg Lawson – American photographer, author, and publisher
- Sagan Lewis – actress, former program director of the Sedona International Film Festival
- Howard Madole – recognized as "Sedona's first architect", his influence is seen all over the city
- Tom O'Halleran – U. S. representative
- Israel Regardie – writer, occultist, and sometime secretary to Aleister Crowley
- Dorothea Tanning – artist, writer, feminist art icon

== In popular culture ==
- Sedona's McDonald's has turquoise Golden Arches.
  A film titled Sedona was released in 2012. It was the first feature film to be shot entirely in Sedona since the 1970s when the heyday of Hollywood filmmaking in the area ended. The cast includes Frances Fisher, Seth Peterson, Barry Corbin, Christopher Atkins, Lin Shaye and Beth Grant.
- In 1993, Sedona city officials refused to allow McDonald's restaurants in the city to use a yellow-colored "M" logo. They were concerned it would clash with the red rock of the city. McDonald's first choice as a replacement color, blue, was accepted by the city council. To this day, out of over 41,000 franchises, only the Sedona McDonald's has a blue "Golden Arches" logo.

== See also ==
- Mogollon Rim
