= Greg Lawson =

Greg Lawson may refer to:

- Greg Lawson (British musician), violinist, composer and conductor, lecturer at the Royal Conservatoire of Scotland
- Greg Lawson (American musician), American songwriter and producer
- Greg Lawson (photographer), American photographer
