= Sedona Wetlands Preserve =

Nature preserve in Arizona

- IUCN category IV (habitat/species management area)
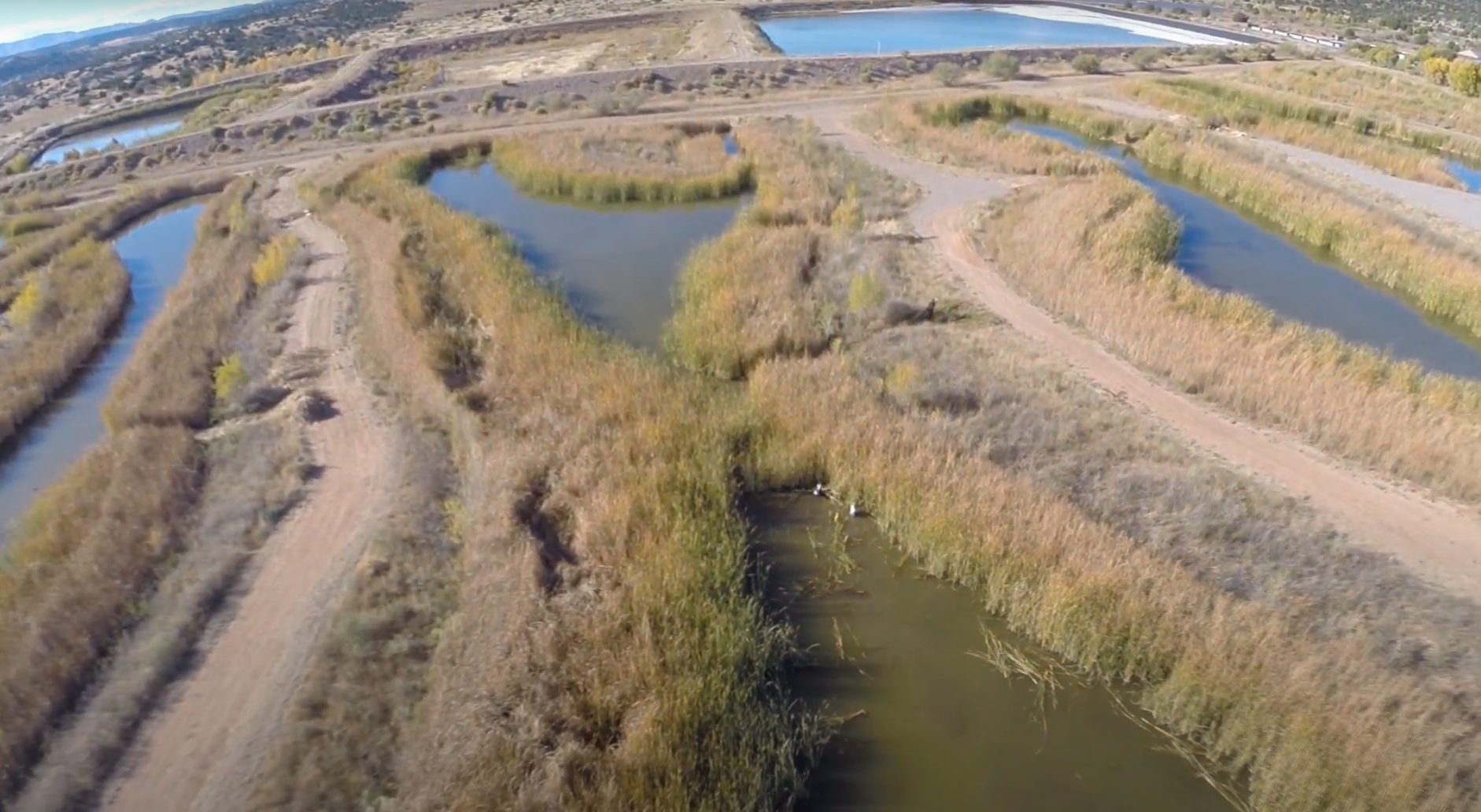
- The preserve in 2014

- Location within Arizona Location within the United States
- Location: 7500 AZ-89A, Sedona, AZ 86336
- Coordinates: 34.8300°N 111.8946°W
- Area: 27 acres (11 ha)
- Elevation: 3,773–3,978 ft (1,150–1,212 m)
- Established: September 27, 2013
- Operator: City of Sedona

The Sedona Wetlands Preserve is a nature preserve near Sedona, Arizona. It is composed of six man-made basins It is located south of the city's wastewater treatment facility. It is a popular destination for birdwatchers in Arizona as birds such as ducks and shorebirds are usually absent from the preserve's dry surroundings.

== History ==
The preserve was called the Sedona Wetlands during planning until a meeting in November 2012 concluded that "Preserve" was to be added to the name. It was dedicated on September 27, 2013. The preserve and the treatment facility cost $34 million in total.

== Description ==
The preserve occupies 27 acres (11 ha), with 12.2 acres (4.9 ha) being water. There are six basins in which water treated by the neighboring facility is discharged. The effluent that flows into the preserve has been treated to A+ quality standards. The basins exist to increase the evaporation of effluent and increase evapotranspiration. The basins' depth can range from fairly shallow to about 4 ft (1.2 m) deep.

Fishing, kayaking, and swimming are prohibited at the preserve. Islands have been constructed in some of the basins to allow wildlife to inhabit and breed in the area. Additionally, plants native to wetlands were added to attract animals and prevent erosion. The Northern Arizona Audubon Society offers free birding trips to the preserve seasonally. To control weeds, 200 grass carp were introduced to the ponds in 2015 under a permit from the Arizona Game and Fish Department. The fish will not be able to travel to other bodies of water as it is isolated.
