= Brian J. Smith =

American film, television, and stage actor (born 1981)

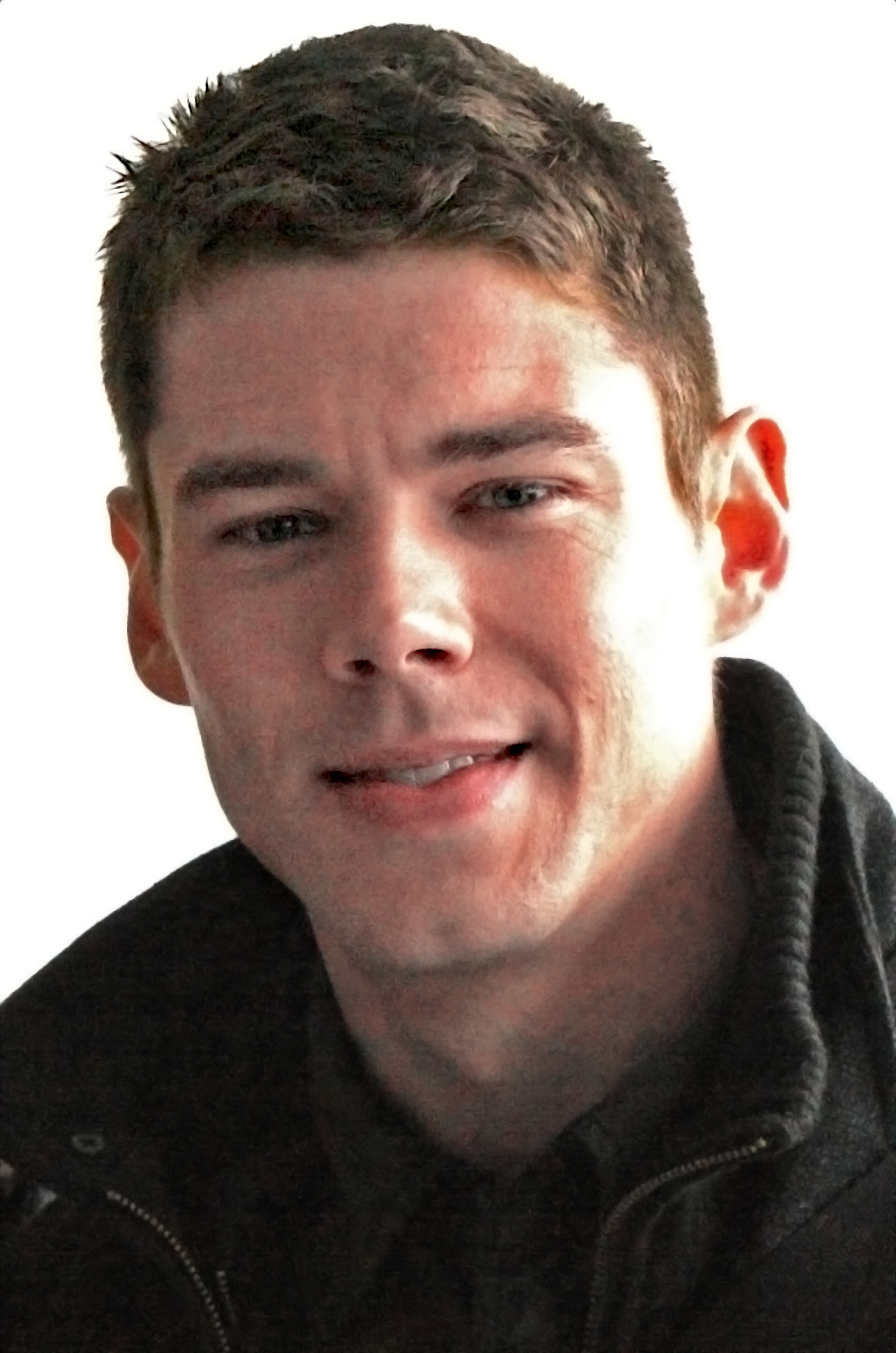
- Smith in 2010
- Born: Brian Jacob Smith; October 12, 1981 (age 44); Allen, Texas, U.S.
- Education: Collin College; Juilliard School (BFA)
- Occupation: Actor
- Years active: 2005–present

Brian Jacob Smith (born October 12, 1981) is an American actor. Smith is known for portraying Will Gorski in the Netflix-produced series Sense8 and Lieutenant Matthew Scott in the military science fiction television series Stargate Universe. He is also known for his Tony Award-nominated role as Jim O'Connor (The Gentleman Caller) in the 2013 Broadway revival of The Glass Menagerie.

== Early life and education ==
Smith is a native of Allen, Texas. He studied at the Quad C Theatre program at Collin County Community College in Plano, Texas. After he was an apprentice for one year at Stephens College in Columbia, Missouri, Smith moved to New York City to attend the Juilliard School Drama Division's four-year acting program (Group 36: 2003–2007). Smith graduated from Juilliard with a Bachelor of Fine Arts degree in 2007.

== Career ==
While enrolled at Collin College, Smith worked as theatre technician. He was later cast as Alex in A Clockwork Orange in a Quad C Theatre production to a positive review from the Dallas Observer. In 2005, he portrayed Trey, a gay man facing intolerance from the son of a fundamentalist preacher, in Hate Crime, an independent film that featured at gay and lesbian film festivals around the United States.

Upon graduating from Juilliard, Smith briefly considered joining the US Army due to several setbacks in his career.

Smith eventually received acting roles in two more independent films, Red Hook and The War Boys. In 2008, he appeared on Broadway in the play Come Back, Little Sheba as the character Turk. Smith was cast as Lieutenant Matthew Scott, a lead role in the 2009 Stargate television series, Stargate Universe, until its cancellation in 2010. He also guest-starred on Law & Order in 2009.

In 2011, Smith recurred on The CW's Gossip Girl and starred in the SyFy original film Red Faction: Origins. In April 2012, he began his run as Andrei in the hit Broadway show, The Columnist, which ended in July 2012. His next projects included the mini-series Coma from producer Tony Scott and an appearance on Warehouse 13 for SyFy.

From September 2013 to February 2014, he played The Gentleman Caller in a Broadway production of Tennessee Williams's The Glass Menagerie at the Booth Theatre. This role earned him 2014 Drama Desk and Tony Award nominations as Outstanding Featured Actor in a Play. In 2015, he appeared in the pilot episode of Quantico as one of the new FBI recruits.

Smith was a lead cast member on the Netflix original series Sense8 (2015–2018) playing the character Will Gorski. He followed up with main roles on Treadstone, a serial spin-off of the Bourne films, and the BBC World War II drama mini series World on Fire in 2019.

Smith played Berg in The Matrix Resurrections in 2021 and in 2023, was cast as Daniel Lennix, a lead character in FX on Hulu's series Class of '09 and as Ken in Essex County a Canadian television drama.

A House Is Not a Disco, his debut documentary film as a director, premiered at the 2024 SXSW festival.

== Personal life ==
On November 7, 2019, Smith came out as gay in an interview with Attitude.

== Filmography ==
=== Film ===
Year	Title	Role	Notes
2005	Hate Crime	Trey McCoy	
2009	The War Boys	George	
2009	Red Hook	Chappy	
2016	The Passing Season	Sam Alden	
2018	22 Chaser	Ben Dankert	
2021	The Matrix Resurrections	Berg	

=== Television ===
Year	Title	Role	Notes
2004	Stargate Atlantis	Soldier	Season 1, episode 10: "The Storm"
2009	Law & Order	Derek Sherman	Episode: "Crimebusters"
2009–2010	Stargate Universe Kino	Matthew Scott	Main role; 10 episodes
2009–2011	Stargate Universe	Matthew Scott	Main role; 40 episodes
2010	Agatha Christie's Poirot	Hector MacQueen	Episode: "Murder on the Orient Express"
2011	Gossip Girl	Max Harding	6 episodes
2011	Red Faction: Origins	Jake Mason	TV movie
2012	Warehouse 13	Jesse Ashton	Episode: "Personal Effects"
2012	Coma	Paul Carpin	2 episodes
2012	The Good Wife	Ricky Waters	Episode: "The Art of War"
2012	Person of Interest	Shayn Coleman	Episode: "Shadow Box"
2013	Blue Bloods	Robert Carter	Episode: "Devil's Breath"
2013	Defiance	Gordon McClintlock	2 episodes
2013	Unforgettable	John Curtis	Episode: "Past Tense"
2015	Quantico	Eric Packer	Episode: "Run"
2015–2018	Sense8	Will Gorski	Main role; 24 episodes
2018	L.A. Confidential	Ed Exley	Unsold series pilot
2019	Treadstone	Doug McKenna	Main role; 10 episodes
2019	World on Fire	Webster O'Connor	Main role; 6 episodes
2023	Essex County	Ken	Main role; 5 episodes
2023	Class of '09	Daniel Lennix	Miniseries; main cast
TBA	Vought Rising		Main role

=== Theatre ===
Year	Title	Role	Notes
2008	Come Back, Little Sheba	Turk	Manhattan Theatre Club; Broadway
2008	Good Boys and True	Brandon	Second Stage Theatre; Off-Broadway
2008	Three Changes	Gordon	Playwrights Horizons; Off-Broadway
2012	The Columnist	Andrei	Manhattan Theatre Club; Broadway
2013	The Glass Menagerie	The Gentleman Caller	American Repertory Theater; Boston, MA
2013	The Glass Menagerie	The Gentleman Caller	Booth Theatre; Broadway
2017	The Glass Menagerie	The Gentleman Caller	Duke of York's Theatre; London, UK
2017	Sweet Bird of Youth	Chance Wayne	Chichester Festival Theatre
2025	Grangeville	Arnie	Signature Theatre Company, Off-Broadway

== Awards and nominations ==
Year	Award	Category	Work	Result
2013	Elliot Norton Award	Outstanding Ensemble	The Glass Menagerie	Won
2014	Tony Award	Best Performance by an Actor in a Featured Role in a Play	The Glass Menagerie	Nominated
2014	Drama Desk Award	Outstanding Featured Actor in a Play	The Glass Menagerie	Nominated
2014	Drama League Award	Distinguished Performance	The Glass Menagerie	Nominated
2014	Outer Critics Circle Award	Outstanding Featured Actor in a Play	The Glass Menagerie	Won
2014	Broadway.com Audience Choice Award	Favorite Featured Actor in a Play	The Glass Menagerie	Nominated
2014	Broadway.com Audience Choice Award	Favorite Breakthrough Performance (Male)	The Glass Menagerie	Nominated
2014	BroadwayWorld.com Award	Best Featured Actor in a Play	The Glass Menagerie	Won
