= A House Is Not a Disco =

2024 film by Brian J. Smith

- Directed by: Brian J. Smith
- Produced by: Joe Conforti; Jeremy Truong
- Cinematography: Eric Schleicher
- Edited by: Blake Pruitt
- Music by: Simon P. Castonguay
- Production company: Rubbertape
- Release date: March 5, 2024 (SXSW)
- Running time: 90 minutes
- Country: United States
- Language: English

A House Is Not a Disco is an American documentary film, directed by Brian J. Smith and released in 2024. Smith's directorial debut, the film profiles the history and culture of Fire Island Pines, the beach resort community in New York which is one of the major meccas of LGBTQ culture in the United States.

Neil Patrick Harris and David Burtka signed on as executive producers of the film.

The film premiered at the 2024 SXSW festival. It was subsequently screened at the 2024 Inside Out Film and Video Festival.
