= Airport Mesa =

Scenic viewpoint in Sedona, Arizona

- Looking north from the mesa over West Sedona to Capitol Butte (Thunder Mountain) and Coffee Pot Rock
- Location: Airport Road, Sedona, Arizona, U.S.
- Coordinates: 34.855777°N 111.780059°W

Airport Mesa is a scenic overlook and hiking trail in Sedona, Arizona, United States. The overlook is located around 300 yards (900 ft) to the northeast of (and slightly below) Sedona Airport.

Two hiking trails converge at the mesa: the 1.5-mile (2.4 km) Brewer Trail and the 3.2-mile (5.1 km) Airport Loop Trail. The latter connects to Brewer Trail, Table Top Trail, Table Top Bogus Trail, Summit Trail, Bandit Trail and Sedona View Trail.

Another popular viewpoint is located a short distance up the hill, at the entrance to the airport.
