= Sedona Public Library =

Public library in Sedona, Arizona

Coordinates: 34.862496°N 111.818459°W

- Location: Sedona, Arizona, United States
- Established: 1958

Other information
- Director: Judy Poe
- Website: www.sedonalibrary.org

The Sedona Public Library (SPL) is a 501(c)(3) non-profit organization established in 1964 in Sedona, Arizona, United States.

The mission of this organization is to "enrich the lives of residents and visitors by serving as a center for community activities and providing information, cultural, and civic services that are responsive, affordable, and enjoyable." Specifically, the library serves the needs of the community of Sedona by providing youth and family services, community rooms, job finding resources, Internet access, online resources, print materials, eBooks, and entertainment services and much more.

In addition to a staff of 16 employees and a volunteer board of trustees, volunteer workers provide 16,000 hours of vital service to the library’s everyday operation. The Friends of the Sedona Library, Inc. support the library through raising funds and by volunteering. The Friends are a separate entity from the Sedona Public Library.

== History ==
The Sedona Public Library was established in 1958 by the “Friends of the Library” in a donated space that consisted of three shelves of donated books and magazines. In 1964, the Friends of the Library formed a board a trustees to manage the administrative duties of the Library; at the time the library possessed 6,230 books.

Two residents of Sedona, Eugenia Wright and Helen Ecker, donated land on Jordan Road for a new library building. Friends of the Sedona Public library raised more than $75,000 in August 1966, and a new building was complete on October 26, 1969.

By 1985 the Library had grown out of its 5,000 square foot space, and land for a new library was donated in 1986. Ground-breaking ceremonies for the new building took place October 2, 1991. The building was dedicated on October 1, 1994.

In October 2000, Sedona Public Library joined the Yavapai Library Network.

The Children’s Library opened on September 7, 2002. By this time the library was 25,500 square feet.

In December 2005, Sedona Public Library opened a second facility, Sedona Public Library in the Village, in the Village of Oak Creek. In November 2021, the second facility moved to the former Big Park Elementary School.

== Library services ==
The Sedona Public Library offers a variety of services such as access to current print and ebook fiction and non-fiction titles, access to online databases, and access to 17 patron computers. In addition, the library offers a Culture Pass, which gives a library customer free admission for two people at participating arts and cultural institutions.

The Sedona Public Library offers various Library programs for children, teen, and adults ranging from arts and crafts, musical performers, movie nights, writing workshops, book clubs, chess clubs, sewing guilds, children's storytime, and informative programs.
