= Hate Crime (2005 film) =

- Theatrical film poster
- Directed by: Tommy Stovall
- Written by: Tommy Stovall
- Produced by: P. Dirk Higdon; Tommy Stovall; Ebony Tay
- Starring: Seth Peterson; Bruce Davison; Chad Donella; Cindy Pickett; Brian J. Smith; Susan Blakely; Lin Shaye
- Cinematography: Ian Ellis
- Edited by: Darrin Navarro
- Music by: Ebony Tay
- Production company: Pasidg Productions Inc.
- Distributed by: Image Entertainment
- Release dates: January 14, 2005 (Palm Springs International Film Festival); March 16, 2006 (United States)
- Running time: 104 minutes
- Country: United States
- Language: English
- Budget: $500,000
- Box office: $40,758

Hate Crime is a 2005 American mystery drama film written and directed by Tommy Stovall and starring Seth Peterson, Bruce Davison, Chad Donella, Cindy Pickett, and Brian J. Smith. Making the film was Stovall's first experience on a set working with actors, as he had only self-produced videos previously.

== Plot ==
Robbie Levinson (Seth Peterson) and Trey McCoy (Brian J. Smith) are an openly gay couple living in a suburban home near friend and next-door neighbor Kathleen Slansky (Lin Shaye). The couple plans to hold a commitment ceremony to exchange rings. Trey's mother, Barbara (Cindy Pickett), suggests to Trey, who suggests to Robbie, that the couple consider raising a child.

When Chris Boyd (Chad Donella) arrives next-door with a moving truck with friend Alton Kachim (Luke King), they disgustedly watch Trey kiss a nervous Robbie. Alton annoys Chris with his homophobic jokes, and suggests they "do something about it." Chris makes unprovoked, threatening remarks toward Robbie, telling Robbie he will "go to hell" and warns him to “watch his back." Chris is a youth pastor and the son of Pastor Boyd (Bruce Davison) who vehemently condemns homosexuality. Chris delivers Robbie his church's pamphlet after Kathleen refuses it and threatens retaliation should Chris get involved. Robbie subsequently learns of the church and Pastor Boyd, who is angered to learn Chris has long been estranged from his presumed daughter-in-law.

While walking his Boston Terrier, Trey is brutally attacked with a baseball bat and is taken to a hospital, where he falls into a coma. Under criminal investigation, the Boyd family conspires to agree on Chris' alibi. Robbie commits to a child, but Trey soon suffers severe brain hemorrhage and dies, having never awakened since the attack. Robbie dons himself and Trey with their commitment rings at Trey's viewing.

The investigation is transferred to homicide Detective Esposito (Giancarlo Esposito), who asks Robbie if he killed Trey, pointing out his insurance policy and the fact that Robbie's were the only set of fingerprints on the bat. Robbie is arrested and given a restraining order for assaulting Chris after a failed attempt to get a surreptitiously tape-recorded confession from Chris. Esposito moves to make a case against him.

Robbie enters Chris' home and finds gay porn in his internet bookmarks. Pastor Boyd confronts Chris with a private investigator's photographs of Chris meeting for anonymous gay sex on multiple occasions, and it is revealed that Chris was meeting one of his lovers on the night of the murder. Detective Fisher (Farah White) contacts Alton, who surmises that Chris killed Trey, because he phoned his parents' home and he was not there. Pastor Boyd confronts his son and confesses to murdering Trey. Robbie tape-records Pastor Boyd confessing to the murder and turns the tape over to Esposito. Esposito refuses to move against the pastor and confiscates the tape, but Barbara recovers it. Chris contemplates suicide, yet refuses to testify against his father; he does, however, leave Robbie his father's gun. Robbie, Kathleen, and Barbara conspire and execute a plan to kill Pastor Boyd in a disguised break-in to retrieve the tape-recording. With Chris's testimony against his dead father, Esposito reluctantly accepts the staged break-in as fact.

== Cast ==
- Seth Peterson as Robbie Levinson
- Bruce Davison as Pastor Boyd
- Chad Donella as Chris Boyd
- Cindy Pickett as Barbara McCoy
- Brian J. Smith as Trey McCoy
- Susan Blakely as Martha Boyd
- Lin Shaye as Kathleen Slansky
- Farah White as Det. Elizabeth Fisher
- Giancarlo Esposito as Detective Esposito
- Sean Hennigan as Jim McCoy
- Brandy Little as Stella
- Ben Bathman as Connor Davis
- Luke King as Alton Kachim
- Earl Browning III as Detective Loy
- Scarlett McAlister as Doctor Kucera

== Premieres ==
Hate Crime had its world premiere at the Palm Springs International Film Festival in January 2005. The film debuted at the Breckenridge Festival of Film in September 2005 and won three awards. It premiered in New York City on March 16, 2006, and the following night in Los Angeles at Laemmle's Sunset 5 in recognition of the second annual International Day Against Homophobia and Transphobia. The film premiered in Stovall's hometown of Dallas, Texas, at the Magnolia Theater on April 27, 2006.

The film premiered in Canada at Rainbow Cinemas on August 16, 2006, and proceeds were donated to the AIDS Committee of London. Canadian Ebony Tay, the film's producer and composer, worked with Stovall to write lyrics for the controversial closing credits dance song "Jesus by 45," which she performed live at most of the movie premiers' cities. The song was featured on Billboard Top 20 Dance Club Hits. Image Entertainment released the film on DVD on November 14, 2006.

== Reviews ==
The film holds an approval rating of 6% at the review aggregator platform Rotten Tomatoes.

Film critic Roger Ebert gave the film 2.5 stars, calling it "actually more of a thriller than a social commentary." In Ebert's review, he wrote that the film "holds our attention and contains surprises right until the end" and "raises complex moral issues that makes the movie more thought-provoking than we could possibly have expected." The Arizona Republic said first-time filmmaker Stovall "appears to have an ax to grind against organized religion". The Orange County Register called the cast "talented" but labeled the film a "revenge fantasy", its villains "transparent", and the plot resolution "sadly predictable."

== Awards ==
| Award | Category | Subject | Result |
|---|---|---|---|
| Breckenridge Festival of Film Award | Best Supporting Actor | Chad Donella | Won |
| Breckenridge Festival of Film Award | Best Supporting Actress | Lin Shaye | Won |
| Breckenridge Festival of Film Award | Best Director | Tommy Stovall | Won |
| Dallas Audience Award | Best Feature Film | Tommy Stovall | Won |
| Fort Worth Gay and Lesbian International Film Festival | Audience Award for Best Feature | Tommy Stovall | Won |
| Fort Worth Gay and Lesbian International Film Festival | Q Award for Best Feature | Tommy Stovall | Won |
| Rhode Island International Film Festival | Second Prize for Best Feature | Tommy Stovall | Won |
| Sedona International Film Festival | Audience Award for Best Feature | Tommy Stovall | Won |
| Sedona International Film Festival | Director's Choice Award for Best Feature | Tommy Stovall | Won |
