= Chad Donella =

Canadian actor (born 1978)

- Born: Chad E. Donella; May 18, 1978 (age 48); Toronto, Ontario, Canada
- Occupation: Actor
- Years active: 1989–present
- Height: 1.75 m (5 ft 9 in)
- Spouse: Joni Bertin (m. 2007)

Chad E. Donella (born May 18, 1978) is a Canadian actor who has appeared in several movies and television shows. He married Joni Bertin in 2007.

== Life and career ==
Chad Donella attended the Arts York Drama Program, in which he participated in such plays as Oedipus Rex, Waiting for Godot, and The Collected Works of Billy the Kid. He has performed at Toronto's Factory Theatre and the Markham Theatre. He also played bass for a time in a band called DAEVE. He has appeared in several movies such as Final Destination, The Long Kiss Goodnight, and Disturbing Behavior. In addition to his roles on film, he also obtained many parts on television, appearing in shows like The X-Files, Smallville, CSI: Crime Scene Investigation, NCIS, Monk and Lost. In many of his roles, he has portrayed teenagers and young men undergoing a crisis. Donella had a role as Officer Gibson in Saw 3D, which was directed by Kevin Greutert.

== Filmography ==
=== Film ===
List of films and roles
Year	Title	Role	Notes
1989	Stray Dogs	Billy	Short film
1996	The Long Kiss Goodnight	Teenage Burnout #2	
1996	Heart of My Heart	Monk	Short film
1998	Disturbing Behavior	U.V.	
2000	Final Destination	Tod Waggner	
2000	Moon Palace	Tyler	Short film
2002	100 Women	Sam	
2003	A Wondrous Fate	Carter	Short film
2003	Shattered Glass	David Bach	
2005	Hate Crime	Chris Boyd	
2007	Dakota	Jack	
2007	9 Lives of Mara	Robin Jr.	Won–2008 Tabloid Witch Award for Best Actor
2010	Saw 3D	Gibson	
2014	Taken 3	Phillips	
2016	Middle Man	Officer Flick	
2016	It's Not What You Know	Party Goer	Short film
2023	Knox Goes Away	Jordan Moore	

=== Television ===
List of television appearances and roles
Year	Title	Role	Notes
1997	Fast Track	Ronny	Episode: "Lap of Faith"
1998	Someone to Love Me	Will	Television film
1998	ER	Kevin Delaney	Episode: "Stuck on You"
1998	The Practice	Kevin Peete	2 episodes
1999	The X-Files	Robert 'Rob' Roberts	Episode: "Hungry"
2000	Secret Agent Man	Jay	Episode: "Like Father, Like Monk"
2001	All Souls	Jordan Terrance Holland	Episode: "The Deal"
2001, 2010	Smallville	Gregory "Greg" Arkin / Bug Boy	2 episodes
2002	Superfire	Rob Torreck	Television film
2002	Providence	Kevin's Imaginary Friend	2 episodes
2002	Taken	Jacob Clarke	2 episodes
2003	Dragnet	Eddie Polian	Episode: "The Big Ruckus"
2003	Monk	Ricky Babbage	Episode: "Mr. Monk and the Sleeping Suspect"
2004	Cold Case	Jeff Kern	Episode: "It's Raining Men"
2005	CSI: Crime Scene Investigation	Vincent Decarlo	Episode: "Snakes"; Uncredited
2005	NCIS	John Briggs	Episode: "Mind Games"
2005	Without a Trace	Brad Stone	Episode: "Honor Bound"
2007	Ghost Whisperer	Randy Cooper	2 episodes
2008	CSI: Miami	Seth McAdams	Episode: "All In"
2009–2010	Majority Rules!	Mr. Ganz	6 episodes
2010	Law & Order: Special Victims Unit	Ronnie	Episode: "P.C."
2010	Lost	Desk Clerk	Episode: "The Package"
2010	Rookie Blue	Detective Don Bibby	Episode: "Honor Role"
2012	Flashpoint	Colin Hunter	Episode: "Sons of the Father"
2013	Castle	Troy Strickland	Episode: "Death Gone Crazy"
2014	Bones	Dan Brewster	Episode: "The Ghost in the Killer"
2014	Perception	Dr. Swank	Episode: "Prologue"
2015	Scandal	Gus	3 episodes
2015	The Assassin Chronicles	Johnny	Television film
2016–2020	Blindspot	Jake Keaton	18 episodes
2025	The Rookie	Payne	Episode: "Chaos Agent"
