= Final Destination (film) =

2000 American supernatural horror film

- Theatrical release poster
- Directed by: James Wong
- Screenplay by: Glen Morgan; James Wong; Jeffrey Reddick
- Story by: Jeffrey Reddick
- Produced by: Warren Zide; Craig Perry; Glen Morgan
- Starring: Devon Sawa; Ali Larter; Kerr Smith; Tony Todd
- Cinematography: Robert McLachlan
- Edited by: James Coblentz
- Music by: Shirley Walker
- Production companies: Zide/Perry Productions; Hard Eight Pictures
- Distributed by: New Line Cinema
- Release date: March 17, 2000
- Running time: 98 minutes
- Country: United States
- Language: English
- Budget: $23 million
- Box office: $112.9 million

Final Destination is a 2000 American supernatural horror film directed by James Wong (in his directorial debut), who co-wrote the screenplay with Glen Morgan and Jeffrey Reddick, based on a story by Reddick. It stars Devon Sawa, Ali Larter, Kerr Smith, and Tony Todd. Sawa portrays a teenager who cheats death after having a premonition of a catastrophic plane explosion. He and several of his classmates leave the plane before the explosion occurs, but Death later takes the lives of those who were meant to die on the plane.

The film began as a spec script written by Reddick for an episode of The X-Files in order for Reddick to get a TV agent. A colleague at New Line Cinema persuaded Reddick to write it as a feature-length film. Later, Wong and Morgan, The X-Files writing partners, became interested in the script and agreed to work on the film. Principal photography took place in New York City and Vancouver, with additional scenes filmed in Toronto and San Francisco.

Final Destination was released in the United States on March 17, 2000. The film achieved commercial success, earning $112.9 million against a $23 million budget. While it received mixed reviews from critics, it won the Saturn Award for Best Horror Film and Best Performance by a Younger Actor for Sawa, The film's popularity led to the expansion of the Final Destination franchise, which includes five additional films, as well as novels and comic books. The first sequel, Final Destination 2, was released on January 31, 2003.

== Plot ==
High school student Alex Browning boards Volée Airlines Flight 180, a Boeing 747-200B, with his classmates for their senior trip to Paris from John F. Kennedy Airport. Before take-off, Alex has a premonition that the plane will explode in mid-air, killing everybody on board. When the events from his vision begin to occur in reality, he panics until a fight breaks out between him and student Carter Horton, resulting in both of them being removed from the plane, along with Alex's best friend Tod Waggner, Carter's girlfriend Terry Chaney, teacher Valerie Lewton, and students Billy Hitchcock and Clear Rivers. None of them except Clear believe Alex about his vision until the plane explodes shortly after take-off. Afterwards, the survivors are interrogated by two FBI agents, Weine and Schreck, who are both suspicious of Alex.

After a memorial service, Tod slips on a puddle of water from the toilet and falls into the bathtub while a clothesline wraps around his neck, strangling him to death. While his death is ruled a suicide, Alex sneaks into the funeral home to examine Tod's corpse, where mortician William Bludworth reveals that the survivors who cheated death have disrupted Death's plan and that Death is now claiming the lives of those who were meant to die in the accident. Alex and Clear meet the other survivors at a café, where a heated argument breaks out over what is happening. A frustrated Terry leaves and is suddenly run over by a speeding bus as she steps into the street.

After watching a news report on the cause of the explosion, Alex concludes that Death is reclaiming the survivors in the order they would have died in the disaster. Nonetheless, he is too late to save Ms. Lewton, who is mortally wounded in a chain-reaction accident in her kitchen before a fire causes her house to explode. The remaining survivors reunite while driving through town as Alex explains the situation. Still skeptical of Alex's theory, Carter stops his car at a train crossing to prove it wrong. Alex, Clear, and Billy manage to escape, but Carter, realizing his impending fate, is still trapped in his car. Alex manages to save him just before the car is smashed by an oncoming train that knocks a piece of shrapnel from the wreckage into the air, decapitating Billy. Alex deduces that because he intervened in Carter's death, it skipped to the next person in the sequence.

While hiding in a secluded cabin the next day, Alex realizes that because he changed seats with two classmates before take-off, he had miscalculated the original death sequence, making Clear the next intended victim. He rushes to her house to save her while Weine and Schreck pursue him. Alex finds Clear trapped inside her car, surrounded by loose electrical cables that ignite a gasoline leak around her. He grabs the cable, allowing her to escape the car just before it explodes.

Six months later, Alex travels to Paris with Clear and Carter to celebrate their survival. While discussing their ordeal, Alex realizes that by saving Clear from the car explosion, he caused Death to skip her and move on to him as the next in line. Fearing their struggle is unfinished, Alex retreats when a bus collision hurls a parking sign towards a neon sign that begins falling towards him. Carter pushes Alex out of the way at the last second, but the sign swings back toward him, implying his death as the film abruptly cuts to the end credits.

== Cast ==
- Devon Sawa as Alex Browning
- Ali Larter as Clear Rivers
- Kerr Smith as Carter Horton
- Kristen Cloke as Valerie Lewton
- Daniel Roebuck as Agent Weine
- Roger Guenveur Smith as Agent Schreck
- Chad E. Donella as Tod Waggner
- Seann William Scott as Billy Hitchcock
- Tony Todd as William Bludworth
- Amanda Detmer as Terry Chaney
- Brendan Fehr as George Waggner
- Forbes Angus as Larry Murnau
- Lisa Marie Caruk as Christa Marsh
- Christine Chatelain as Blake Dreyer
- Barbara Tyson as Barbara Browning
- Robert Wisden as Ken Browning
- P. Lynn Johnson as Mrs. Waggner
- Larry Gilman as Mr. Waggner
- Mark Holden as co-pilot
- Fred Keating as Howard Seigel

Several film characters are named after famous horror film directors, actors, and producers: Billy Hitchcock is named after Alfred Hitchcock, the Browning family and Tod Waggner are named after Tod Browning, Larry Murnau is a reference to Friedrich Wilhelm Murnau, Blake Dreyer to Carl Theodor Dreyer, Valerie Lewton to Val Lewton, Agent Schreck to Max Schreck, Terry Chaney to Lon Chaney, Christa Marsh recalls Fredric March, Agent Weine of Robert Wiene and Tod and George Waggner are directly named after Universal Horror film producer George Waggner.

== Production ==
=== Development ===
The original idea was written by Jeffrey Reddick as a spec script for The X-Files in order to get a TV agent. "I was actually flying home to Kentucky and I read a story about a woman who was on vacation and her mom called her and said, 'Don't take the flight tomorrow, I have a really bad feeling about it.' She switched flights and the plane that she would have been on crashed", said Reddick. "I thought, that's creepy—what if she was supposed to die on that flight?" Building on his idea, Reddick wrote a script and got an agent, but instead of submitting the script to The X-Files, he acted on the suggestion of a colleague at New Line Cinema to write it as a feature film.

New Line Cinema bought Reddick's treatment and hired him to write the original draft of the script, which featured Death as an unseen force. The survivors were originally adults, but New Line made Reddick change them to teenagers after the success of Scream. After the script was finished, New Line Cinema submitted the script to directors, including writing partners James Wong and Glen Morgan. Both writers were willing to make it into a film, although they rewrote the script to comply with their standards. "I believe that at one time or another we've all experienced a sense of prescience. We have a hunch, a feeling, and then that hunch proves true", Wong said. "We want to do for planes and air travel what Jaws did for sharks and swimming". Expanding on his decision to write and direct the film, Wong stated:

One thing we were all in agreement on from the start is that we didn't want to do a slasher movie. [...] I became very excited when we decided to make the world at large, in the service of death, our antagonist. Everyday objects and occurrences then take on ominous proportions and it becomes less about whether or not our characters are going to die and more about how they will die and how they can delay their deaths. The entertainment value is in the "ride" not in the outcome, and by placing the premise of the film on the inevitability of death, we play a certain philosophical note.

Morgan said:

The main thing they wanted about Death coming to get people is that you never saw a kind of a Michael Myers figure. You never saw a killer. And they liked that idea and they said, "Okay. Go write it." Once we had a basic story, I started cataloging the strange coincidences in my own life. For example, I was in the Vancouver airport waiting for a flight when John Denver came on over the loudspeaker. I remember saying to myself, "Hey, he just died in a plane crash – that's a little weird." We wrote that version of that experience into the script.

Producers Craig Perry and Warren Zide from Zide/Perry Productions helped with the film's budget because both were similarly fascinated by the idea of an invisible force executing its victims. Perry, a fan of The X-Files, claimed that he "responded to Wong and Morgan's work for one specific reason: dread". Years later, however, Reddick admitted that not giving the franchise a physical antagonist was regrettable, stating, "now every Halloween I go, 'We blew it!' There's no costume to buy, there's no action figure." New Line Cinema accepted financing and distributing rights for the film after Reddick came to them personally.

=== Casting ===
A screenshot from the film showing the main cast: (from left to right) Kristen Cloke as Valerie Lewton, Seann William Scott as Billy Hitchcock, Kerr Smith as Carter Horton, Amanda Detmer as Terry Chaney, Devon Sawa as Alex Browning, Chad Donella as Tod Waggner, and Ali Larter as Clear Rivers.

"One of the most important things we were looking for in casting was the actors' ability to play the subtleties – the little things that a character doesn't say or do that create the edge, the things that get under your skin and spook you", Morgan said about the auditions. Reddick originally envisioned Tobey Maguire and Kirsten Dunst for the lead roles of Alex Browning and Clear Rivers. Craig Perry envisioned Jessica Biel for the role of Clear.

Alex Browning, the last role cast, went to Canadian actor Devon Sawa, who previously starred in the 1999 film Idle Hands. Sawa said that when he read the script on a plane, he found himself peeking out the window at the engine every couple of minutes. Then he went down and met Morgan and Wong, and he thought "they were amazing and already had some great ideas". However, Morgan and Wong were undecided about casting him for the part, so they requested him to perform again as they reviewed his previous works. Morgan was astounded by Sawa's performance in Idle Hands, and Sawa was hired. Of the script, Sawa said, "There's not a lot of good stuff [...] for my age. You get a lot of scripts and all but they're teen ensembles and they're just crap. And then I got Flight 180 [...] it's just awesome."

Sawa described his role as "in the beginning, [Alex] was kinda loopy and cotter, and you know, probably not the most popular guy in school. I think he might have been a dork, you know, doing their stuff and they had their own thing going and they're after the two beautiful girls in school, but there's no chance of that happening. I guess after the plane goes down, his world completely changes". "Devon has an everyman quality that makes him accessible", Wong said. "He doesn't appear as if he's supremely self-assured. He's more of a regular kid who can take on the complexities of the role and become a hero". Perry was amazed by Sawa's vulnerability in acting, describing him as "a very distinctive actor. He's very loose and he's kind of a cut-up when he's not on camera, but the moment the camera's on, I'd never seen anybody to completely slide right through the moment."

Ali Larter, who starred in the 1999 film Varsity Blues, was cast as female lead Clear Rivers. "The film shows how easy it is to turn on someone, to blame someone when you're scared", Larter said. "It's also about trusting your intuitions and yourself". She defined her part as "that girl who has a lot of loss in her life and has fallen for herself and had made a life within that. She's an artist, she lives by herself, and she's kinda holding to her grip for what the world has given her".

Seann William Scott, famous for portraying Steve Stifler in the 1999 film American Pie, was hired as class clown Billy Hitchcock. Scott admired the film and felt that "it's [as] dark and eerie as any Twilight Zone". He laughed at his role, saying that "[he] is lacking some social skills, he doesn't have quite a few friends, and he's like the tag-along." Scott was surprised when in the script his character was written as fat. The writers eventually changed it for Scott.

Dawson's Creek star Kerr Smith was cast as jock Carter Horton. Smith identified Carter as "your typical high school bully whose life depends on anger" and mentioned the fact that Carter feared Alex not having control of his own life.

Kristen Cloke, Morgan's wife, was cast as teacher Valerie Lewton. "I have incredible respect for them", said Cloke. "Jim's the kind of director who knows exactly what he wants. As an actor, I can find a way to get there if I know specifically what I'm going for, and Jim gives me that. The fact that he won't move on until he's got exactly what he wants creates a safe environment, which allows me to experiment and try different things". Cloke described her part as "strong and sassy – in control. After the crash, she comes unglued, probably more than any of the kids, and it's a quick, drastic change. I had to understand the psychology of a person who can turn on a dime like that".

Newcomers Amanda Detmer and Chad Donella were cast as students Terry Chaney and Tod Waggner, respectively. "When I first read the script, the thing that struck me most was that the characters were well-written and the relationships between them were strong and believable", Detmer said. "That's important because you have to care about these people in order to be worried about what might happen to them". Detmer defined Terry as "very put-together [and] seems content to defer to [Carter] – to not make waves. But the stress of what happens affects their relationship and interestingly enough brings out a certain strength in her". On the other hand, Donella observed how similar his role was to himself. "I believe in fate. I think you come into this life with some things to accomplish and you're taken out earlier or later depending on the game plan".

Tony Todd, who played Candyman in the 1992 film Candyman, was cast as mortician William Bludworth. Morgan initially wanted Todd for the role because he felt his deep voice would give the film an eerie tone.

Additional cast members included Daniel Roebuck and Roger Guenveur Smith as FBI agents Weine and Schreck; Brendan Fehr, Christine Chatelain, and Lisa Marie Caruk as students George Waggner, Blake Dreyer, and Christa Marsh; Barbara Tyson and Robert Wisden as Barbara and Ken Browning, Alex's parents; and Forbes Angus as teacher Larry Murnau.

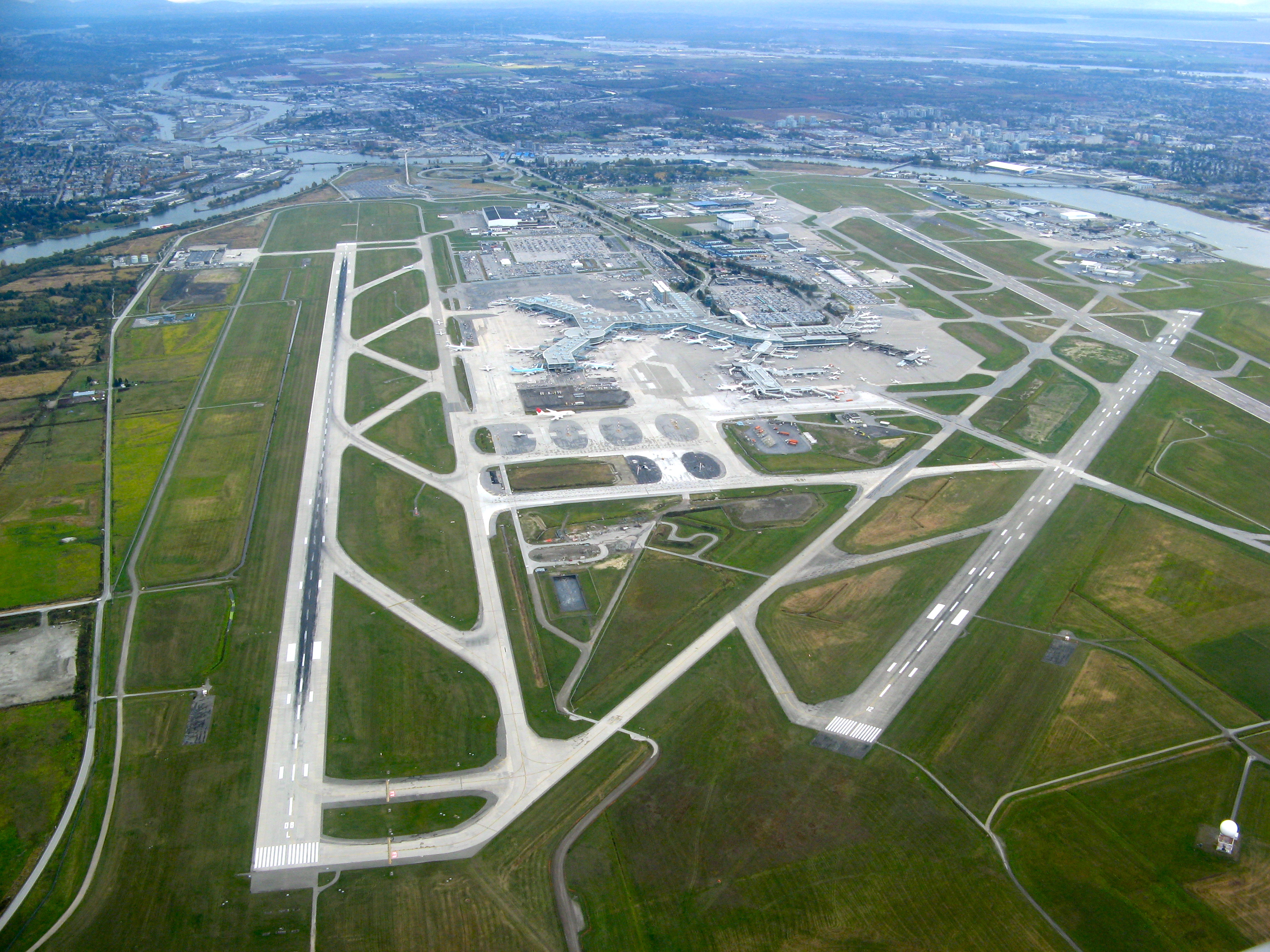
In the film, John F. Kennedy International Airport was the location of the Flight 180 explosion, but the crew actually used Vancouver International Airport (above) for the film.

=== Filming ===
With Final Destination cast, filming took place on Long Island for the plane scene and Vancouver Island for the additional scenes. The cast members were filming other projects during production, so filming schedules had to be moved repeatedly for all of the cast to appear. Sawa restrained his appearance in The Guilty during production, and even commented that "[he] had to share a trailer with Bill Pullman because it was bigger and would make him look more famous". Smith, who was a regular in Dawson's Creek, had to hold episodes for the film.

According to Detmer, her death scene (being rammed by a speeding bus) was filmed first because "it was easy but much anticipated". All death scenes were filmed using lifecasts of the actual actors. The death scenes, the memorial, the forest scene and the scenes in Paris were all filmed in Victoria. Additional scenes were filmed in Toronto and San Francisco. For the airport, the crew used Vancouver International Airport as a stand-in for John F. Kennedy International Airport, the airport mentioned in the film.

=== Effects ===
The plan behind the scenes was to create an intriguing visual signature. To serve the subtleties of the script and to help personify death, production designer John Willet developed the concept of "skewing" the sets. "What I've tried to do with the sets themselves, with their design and with various color choices, is to make things just a little unnatural", Willet explained. "Nothing that calls attention to itself, but instead creates a sense of uneasiness—the unsettling feeling that something's not quite right". To achieve this mystique, Willet designed two versions of virtually every set—one version was used before the crash, and the other sets were used for scenes after the jet explodes.

"On the skewed sets I force the perspective either vertically or horizontally", Willet explained. "Nothing is square and, although you can't put your finger on it, it just makes you feel like something is not right". Skewing was also part of the overall design for the color palette used in set decoration and costume design. "In the real world, the colors are bright and rich", Willet said. "In the skewed world, they're washed out and faded. Nothing is obvious, and it's only in the overall effect that these subtle differences will work their magic".

The plane scene during which passengers die in mid-air was created inside a very large sound stage. The three-ton hydraulic gimbal was operated automatically. "We spent two months building this central set piece that weighs about 45,000 pounds and holds 89 people", special effects supervisor Terry Sonderhoff explained. Used for filming the onboard sequences, it could be shifted on the gimbal to create a pitching movement of up to 45 degrees side-to-side and 60 degrees front-to-back, realistically conveying the horror of airborne engine failure. Sawa said that "the screams of the cast inside the gimbal made it appear more real". Wong said, "You walk into the studio and there's a huge gimbal with a plane on top and you think, 'What have I done?' I was afraid we were gonna have 40 extras vomiting."

A miniature model of the Boeing 747 airplane was created for the explosion scene. The model, one of the most detailed miniature scenes in the film, was about 10 feet long and 7 feet wide, and the landing gear was made from all machined metals. According to visual effects supervisor Ariel Velasco-Shaw, the miniature had to be launched about 40 feet up into the air to make it look like a real Boeing 747 exploded into a fireball. If blowing up a four-foot plane, the explosion must be a minimum of eight feet in the air. To film the explosion in detail, the crew used three cameras running 120 frames per second and one camera running 300 frames per second (if they had filmed using a real-time camera, the succession of the explosion would not have been filmed in a particular order).

The train scene (in which Carter's car is smashed by the train) was one of the most difficult scenes to shoot. The car used for the crash was a replica of the original, severed in half prior to filming. According to Sonderhoff, in order to ensure the safety of the actors, they had to make sure that there was no real sheet metal in the car.

For the death scenes, the crew used several lifecasts of the actors and chocolate syrup for fake blood. According to the crew, creating the Rube Goldberg effect for Ms. Lewton's death scene was the most difficult to plan. Perry said that "it was very hard to generate an atmosphere of dread, to create suspense out of scenes that are common".

=== Music ===
==== Soundtrack ====
No official album accompanied the motion picture. However, five songs are featured in the film, the most prominent of which is "Rocky Mountain High" by John Denver, which is heavily highlighted throughout the film, reminding the survivors that Denver died in a plane crash. The song is heard either before an accident or a character's demise, and is also played by a street performer (Alessandro Juliani) in French. Other songs featured in the film include "Hundred Grand" by Pete Atherton (during the Flight 180 memorial scene), "Into the Void" by Nine Inch Nails (during the café scene), "All the Candles in the World" by Jane Siberry (during Carter's car scene), as well as "And When I Die" performed by Joe 90 (during the end credits).

==== Score ====
Final Destination: The Complete Original Motion Picture Score was released on March 17, 2000. The film's score was conducted by composer Shirley Walker.

== Release ==
=== Box office ===
The film premiered on March 17, 2000, in 2,587 theaters across the United States and Canada, earning $10,015,822 on its opening weekend, with an average of $3,871 per theater. Final Destination placed at No. 3 in the United States box office on its opening weekend, behind biography film Erin Brockovich and the science fiction film Mission to Mars. The film remained at No. 3 during the second weekend, before dropping to No. 7 on its third weekend. Final Destination continuously dropped across subsequent weekends until it fell from the top-10 list on its eighth weekend. The film lasted in theaters for 22 weekends, its last screening airing in 105 theaters and grossing $52,675, placing at No. 56. Final Destination was a commercial success, grossing $53,331,147 in the United States and Canada on its total screening and $59,549,147 in other territories, bringing its global total to $112,880,294.

=== Home media ===
Final Destination was released on VHS and DVD on September 26, 2000, by New Line Home Video, in the United States and Canada. The DVD bonus features include three audio commentaries, three deleted scenes, and two documentaries. The first commentary features Wong, Morgan, Reddick, and editor James Coblentz describing the minute subtleties included by the creative team throughout the film, which either allude to death or foreshadow the deaths in the film invisible upon initial airing. They also discuss how the film was made and how they fought the executives of New Line Cinema over various factors.

The second commentary includes Sawa, Smith, Cloke, and Donella discussing what was involved in certain scenes and how they each were cast. The third commentary is the isolated music score of Walker included in the film's score.

Deleted scenes cover two subplots of Alex and Clear, an alternate ending where Alex dies after rescuing Clear from the live wires, Clear bearing a baby which she names Alex, and Clear and Carter finishing as the only survivors of the film.

The first documentary entitled A Look at Test Screenings runs for 13 minutes and outlines the test screening process, giving an overview of how those screenings were conducted and scored. The featurette shows video footage of the test screening audience and specific comments regarding why the deleted scenes were either cut or reshot. The second documentary, titled Premonitions, explores real-life intuitive investigator Pam Coronado, who has helped police solve many murders and missing person cases with her psychic abilities. The featurette runs for 20 minutes. Some DVDs contain two non DVD-ROM games—Death Clock and Psychic Test—in addition to the film's theatrical trailer and filmographies of the cast and crew.

A Blu-ray Disc edition was released on April 7, 2009, retaining a majority of the DVD's bonus features.

== Reception ==
=== Critical response ===
Review aggregation website Rotten Tomatoes reported 51% of critics gave the film positive write-ups based on 164 reviews. The site's critics' consensus states, "Despite a panel of X-Files alums at the helm and a promising premise, flighty performances and poor execution keep Final Destination from ever taking off." On Metacritic, the film has a weighted average score of 39 out of 100 based on reviews from 28 critics, indicating "generally unfavorable" reviews. On June 14, 2010, Nick Hyman of Metacritic included Final Destination in the website's editorial 15 Movies the Critics Got Wrong, noting that "the elaborate suspense/action set pieces from the first two films are more impressive than most". Audiences polled by CinemaScore gave the film an average grade of B− on an A+ to F scale.

On the negative side, Stephen Holden of The New York Times said that "even by the crude standards of teenage horror, Final Destination is dramatically flat". Kevin Maynard of Mr. Showbiz described the film as "crude and witless". Rita Kempley of The Washington Post wrote that "your own final destination just might be the box office, to demand your money back".

Jay Carr of The Boston Globe commented that it "starts by cheating death and ends by cheating us". Lisa Alspector of the Chicago Reader described the film as "disturbing—if less sophisticated than the best SF (science fiction)-horror TV". Luke Thompson of the Dallas Observer found it "a waste of a decent premise"; Ernest Hardy of LA Weekly said that the film "fails because it takes itself both too seriously and not seriously enough". Barbara Shulgasser of the Chicago Tribune said that it "met the low standards of a mediocre TV movie". Walter Addiego of the San Francisco Examiner thought it was "stupid, silly and gory".

The film gathered positive reviews from several top critics. Roger Ebert of the Chicago Sun-Times enjoyed the film and gave it three out of four stars, stating that "Final Destination will no doubt be a hit and inspire the obligatory sequels. Like the original Scream, this movie is too good to be the end of the road. I have visions of my own". He also pointed out the similarities between the circumstances of the plane crash depicted in the movie and the real-life crash of TWA Flight 800 in 1996, traveling from New York to Paris and carrying students, which he described as being "in the worst possible taste". Mick LaSalle of the San Francisco Chronicle praised the film, saying "[it] was playful and energized enough to keep an audience guessing". Joe Leydon of Variety praised the film, saying "[it] generates a respectable amount of suspense and takes a few unexpected turns while covering familiar territory", while Kevin Thomas of the Los Angeles Times said it was "a terrific theatrical feature debut for television veterans Glen Morgan and James Wong". Chris Kaltenbach of The Baltimore Sun found the film "fitfully thrilling", Maitland McDonagh of TV Guide called the film "serviceable enough, if you come to it with sufficiently modest expectations". Marjorie Baumgarten of The Austin Chronicle stated the film was "a flawed but often entertaining teen horror flick".

Despite the film's generally mixed reception, critics praised Sawa's performance as Alex. David Nusair of Reel Film Reviews remarked "Sawa's personable turn as the hero is matched by a uniformly effective supporting cast rife with familiar faces (i.e. Seann William Scott, Brendan Fehr, Tony Todd, etc)" while Leydon stated that "Sawa is credible as the second-sighted Alex—unlike many other actors cast as teen protagonists, he actually looks like he might still be attending high school—but the supporting players are an uneven bunch". LaSalle praised Sawa and Ali Larter's pairing, saying that "Larter and Sawa, who becomes more scruffy and wild-eyed as the film progresses, make an appealing pair".

=== Accolades ===
The film had a major impact on the horror film audience, earning the Saturn Award for Best Horror Film at the 27th Saturn Awards in 2000. Sawa won the Saturn Award for Best Performance by a Younger Actor the same year, and Larter won the Young Hollywood Award for a Breakthrough Performance by a Female. At the 7th Blockbuster Entertainment Awards in 2001, both Sawa and Larter were nominated for Favorite Actor in Horror (Internet Only) and Favorite Actress in Horror (Internet Only), respectively. Both actors lost the awards to Scream 3 actors David Arquette and Neve Campbell. Additionally, cinematographer Robert McLachlan was nominated for Best Cinematography in a Theatrical Feature at the Canadian Society of Cinematographers Awards in 2001, but lost to Pierre Gill for his work on The Art of War.

The film's concept was listed at No. 46 in Channel 4's 100 Greatest Scary Moments, in which Smith represented the film. The Flight 180 explosion scene was included in the lists of best fictional plane crashes or disaster scenes by Break Studios, Unreality Magazine, New Movies.net, The Jetpacker, MaximOnline, and Filmsite. Filmsite also included the plane scene and the deaths of three characters (Tod, Terry, and Ms. Lewton) in its Scariest Movie Moments and Scenes, and all fatalities in its Best Film Deaths Scenes. The demise of Detmer's character entered the listings of the most shocking deaths on film of George Wales and Simon Kinnear of Total Film (No. 29 and No. 10, respectively), Simon Hill of Eat Horror (No. 10), and Dirk Sonningsen of Mania (No. 10).

== See also ==
- "Twenty Two" (The Twilight Zone)
