= Sedona Airport =

Airport in Yavapai County, Arizona, United States

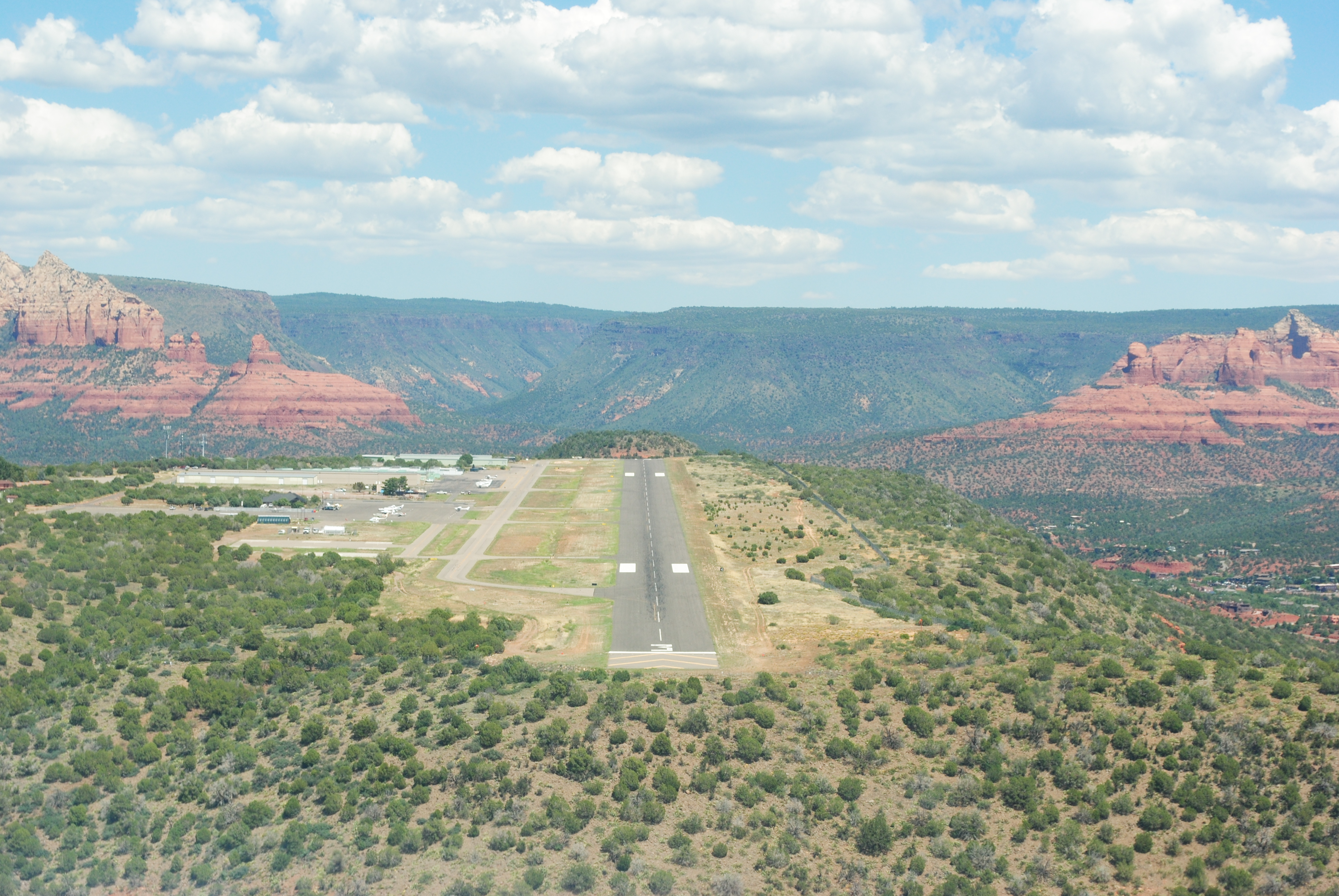
- Looking north in 2010
- IATA: SDX; ICAO: KSEZ; FAA LID: SEZ

Summary
- Airport type: Public
- Owner: Yavapai County
- Location: Sedona, Arizona
- Opened: 1955 (71 years ago)
- Elevation AMSL: 4,830 ft (1,470 m)
- Coordinates: 34°51′00″N 111°47′24″W
- Website: www.sedonaairport.org

Map
- Location within Arizona Location within the United States

Runways
Direction	Length		Surface
Direction	ft	m	Surface
3/21	5,132	1,564	Asphalt

Helipads
Number	Length		Surface
Number	ft	m	Surface
H1	50	15	Concrete

Statistics (2022)
- Aircraft operations (year ending 5/11/2022): 35,000
- Based aircraft: 63
- Source: Federal Aviation Administration

Sedona Airport (IATA: SDX, ICAO: KSEZ, FAA LID: SEZ) is a non-towered airport located 2 miles (1.7 nmi; 3.2 km) southwest of the central business district of Sedona, Arizona, United States. The airport covers 220 acres (89 ha) and has one runway (numbered 3 and 21) and one helipad.

Although most U.S. airports use the same three-letter location identifier for the FAA and IATA, Sedona Airport is assigned SEZ by the FAA and SDX by the IATA (which assigned SEZ to Seychelles International Airport in Mahé, Seychelles).

The airport is located on top of a mesa overlooking a major portion of the city; it has been termed a tabletop runway.

== History ==
The airport was inaugurated in 1955. At that time it had no paved runway, and animals such as coyotes could be seen walking around the air-strip. This proved dangerous to pilots arriving at Sedona. By 1957, a small, paved runway had been built.

By 1990, the airport's runway had been improved and it had begun to receive service from a local scheduled airline. Air Sedona, founded by Jack Seeley in 1981, served Sedona from such places as Sky Harbor International Airport in Phoenix, Las Vegas, the nearby Grand Canyon airport and others until 1995. Sedona's airport is not able to accommodate commercial jets of a size of a Boeing 737 or larger.

Around 1980, the airport was served by the short-lived Desert Pacific Airlines.

Scenic Airlines discontinued service at Sedona in April 1997.

== Accidents and incidents ==
- On April 13, 2003, a Beechcraft Bonanza carrying three people collided with terrain after striking the fence to the southwest of runway 21. The flight instructor, student, and passenger were all fatally injured in the crash.
- Two-time Olympic distance runner Pat Porter, his 15-year-old son Connor, and a friend of his son, 14-year-old Connor Mantsch, died when their airplane, a Beechcraft Duke piloted by Porter, crashed after takeoff from the airport, on July 26, 2012.
- On April 25, 2021, a Cessna 182 Skylane crashed, resulting in two people being injured.

== See also ==
- List of airports in Arizona
- Airport Mesa, a scenic viewpoint a short distance to the northeast
