= Non-towered airport =

Airport without an air traffic control tower

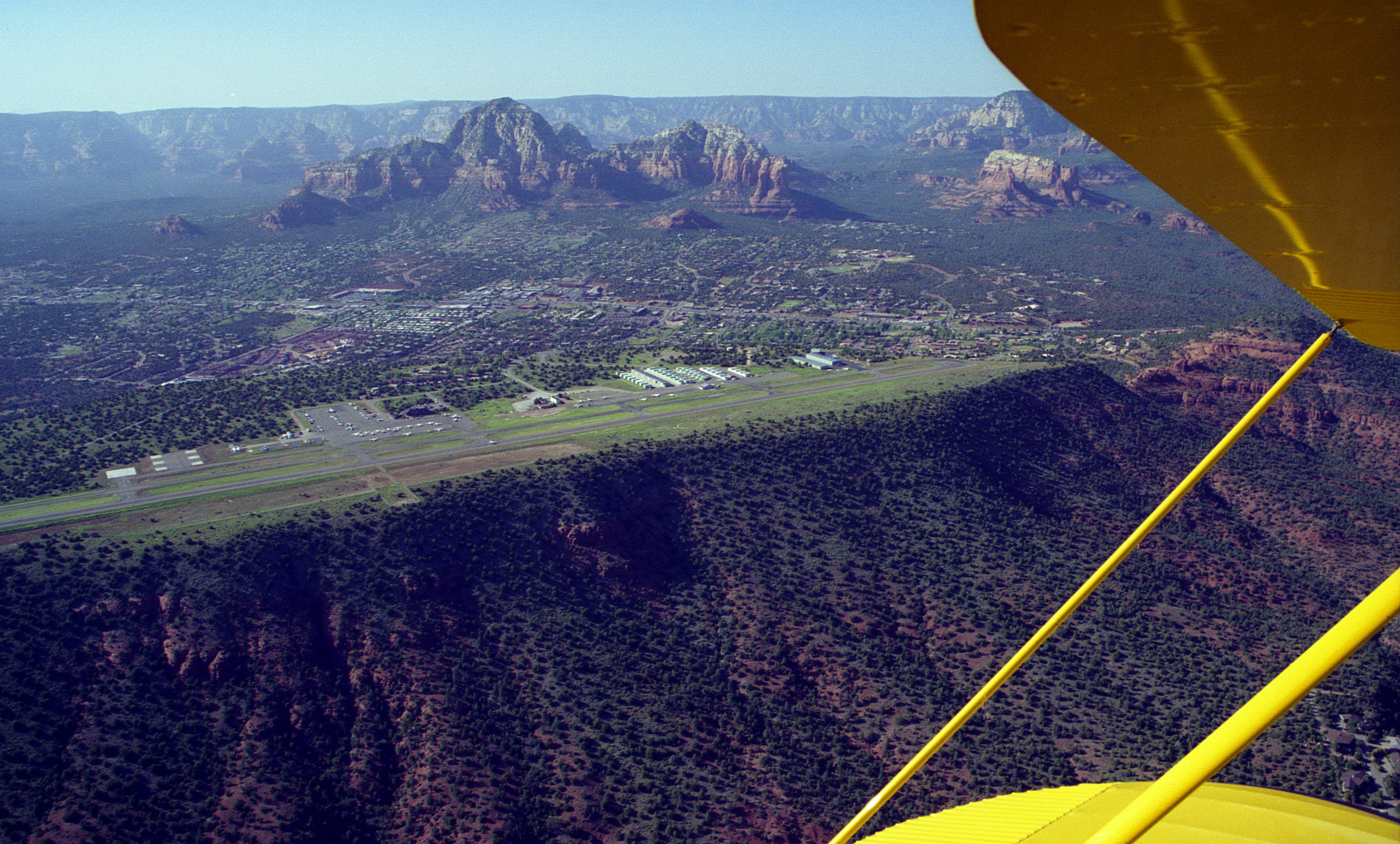
Sedona Airport, in Arizona's Verde Valley, is one of the many airports that operate without a control tower in the United States.

In aviation, a non-towered airport is an airport without an on-site control tower, or air traffic control (ATC) facility. In the United States, there are close to 20,000 non-towered airports, compared to approximately 500 airports with control towers. Airports with a control tower, but without 24/7 ATC service, follow non-towered airport procedures when the tower is closed but the airport remains open, for example at night.

== Operations ==
Standard US airport traffic pattern. Fig. 4-3-2 from FAA AIM.

At non-towered airports, instead of receiving instructions from an air traffic controller, aircraft pilots follow recommended established operations and communications procedures for operating at an airport without a control tower. The exact procedures vary from country to country, but they may include standard arrival and departure procedures, as well as a common communications phraseology by radio transmissions over a common frequency. For example, a common traffic advisory frequency (CTAF) is recommended for radio communication and is used in the United States, Canada, New Zealand, and Australia.

Non-towered airports may be situated inside or underneath controlled airspace. In those occurrences, some or all aircraft arriving and departing require clearances from a remote air traffic control unit, such as an adjacent towered airport, terminal or center control, even though there is no control tower managing landings and takeoffs. Pilots may be able to obtain those clearances by radio, by phone, or through a company dispatcher or local flight service station; in some cases, departing aircraft; instrument flight rules (IFR) or visual flight rules (VFR) take off and level out below the floor of controlled airspace, then radio for a clearance before climbing further. Some countries establish low-altitude VFR corridors for non-towered airports in large urban areas so that VFR arrivals and departures can avoid controlled airspace altogether.

=== MTAF ===
Some countries, such as Canada and Norway, use mandatory frequency airports (MF) or mandatory traffic advisory airports (MTAF), which operate like towered airports in some ways: the radio operators (typically a flight service station) still issue only advisories, but aircraft are required to make radio contact with the ground station before operating in the airport's control zone.

=== UNICOM ===
Many non-towered airports have radio to ground operations such as UNICOM to assist aircraft arriving, departing, or maneuvering on the ground. These radio operators such as from fixed-base operators have no authority to give aircraft clearances or instructions, but they can issue advisories to let them know about weather conditions, runway conditions, traffic, and other concerns.

=== Temporary towers ===
A mobile airport traffic control facility (MATC) is a temporary structure, sometimes a purpose-built vehicle, in an area with an immediate increase in air traffic density. This may be due to wildfire suppression operations carrying out aerial firefighting.

For special events such as fly-ins, temporary towers may operate for only several days each year at airfields that are otherwise non-towered. Temporary towers may operate out of an existing airport building, a recreational vehicle (RV), or even simply a chair (with a portable transmitter and binoculars).

== Criteria ==
When the air traffic volume at an airport gets too high for safe and efficient operations, or when the mix of aircraft types and speeds becomes too large, an airport may be considered for a permanent control tower. However, it is also necessary to find the money to construct a building and pay the controllers' salaries; in some cases aviation regulations or local opposition may prevent establishment of the unit.

== See also ==
- Pilot-controlled lighting
- Remote and virtual tower
