= Greg Lawson (photographer) =

American photographer (born 1944)

- Born: 1944 (age 81–82); Pittsburgh, Pennsylvania, United States
- Known for: Photography (landscape, wildlife, travel)
- Website: Official website

Greg Lawson (born 1944) is an American photographer currently based in Sedona, Arizona, and San Diego, California. As an avid natural history supporter and enthusiast, Lawson focuses primarily on nature, wildlife, travel and landscape photography. Lawson's works have appeared in many newspapers across the United States, such as the Santa Cruz Sentinel, Santa Barbara News-Press, The San Diego Union-Tribune, Sedona Red Rock News, Verde Independent and Honolulu Star-Bulletin.

== Life and career ==
Lawson's interest in photography began at age 14 in New York City when he received a camera from his mother. His interest in the medium never waned and evolved into an image-based art career spanning more than five decades. Lawson's image collection includes work from all 50 United States and all seven continents, and has been produced using camera formats ranging from large format film to modern digital.

Lawson has operated 14 art galleries in the USA, and currently operates two galleries in Sedona, Arizona, and one in La Jolla, California, that have become popular attractions. In 2022, La Jolla Light recognized Greg Lawson Galleries as the area's top art gallery as voted by that publication's readers. The Gallereum in West Sedona, Arizona, is a museum displaying his historic cameras and a gallery exhibiting global images.

Lawson produces his image-based art, which he describes as "paintings with light", in open editions, limited editions and artist proof editions on a variety of media.

Lawson's photography techniques include the aluminum transfer method, where images are produced on aluminum sheets.

In August 2023, Lawson was included in the Marquis Who's Who Top artists under the categories of Visual Artist and Publisher and Founder.

== Media ==
Lawson’s broadcast portal, Terrestrial Public Media, historically produced a weekly talk show called Skylight broadcast in Phoenix, Arizona, and Seattle, Washington. Skylight featured arts-related interviews and also discussed the philosophy of art, including philosophical topics such as Lawson's "Principles Model", a social management ideal that recognizes how humanity is well-served when guided by basic inherent principles such as integrity, empathy and loyalty.

One of Lawson's publishing enterprises, Artsource Media, produces a bi-annual magazine, Artsource America, focusing on the arts and artists across the United States. The first issue was selected as the winner for new magazine design in the publishing industry at the annual Folio Awards in New York City in October 2021.

== Books ==
Lawson has written more than 50 books on natural history, geography and travel. Many of them feature landscape and wildlife photography in the American Southwest, while others focus on US national parks. Some of his selected books are:

- 2017. Heaven Sent
- 2013. Sedona - The Nature of the Place ISBN 978-0976219743
- 2009. Fine As San Diego ISBN 978-0976219705
- 2009. Star Struck: Texas Impressions ISBN 978-0976219736
- 2008. California in the Beginning ISBN 978-0976219798
- 2007. One For All: an introduction to the principles model.
- 2007. Topical Storm, Dody Books.
- 2006. AZ Is: Arizona Imagery ISBN 978-0976219712
- 2005. Natural States ISBN 978-0976219750
- 2005. Sedona: The Nature of the Place ISBN 978-0976219743
- 2005. Americana Photography ISBN 978-0976219750
- 1990. Oh California ISBN 978-0916251345
- 1989. Palm Springs Oasis ISBN 978-0916251406
- 1987. San Diego County ISBN 978-0976219750
- 1985. San Diego ISBN 978-0916251260
- 1984. Los Angeles ISBN 978-0960670499
- 1983. California ISBN 978-0960670468
- 1981. Hawaii ISBN 978-0916251413
- 1981. Beauty Spot Santa Barbara ISBN 978-0960670413
