= Seth Peterson =

American actor (born 1970)

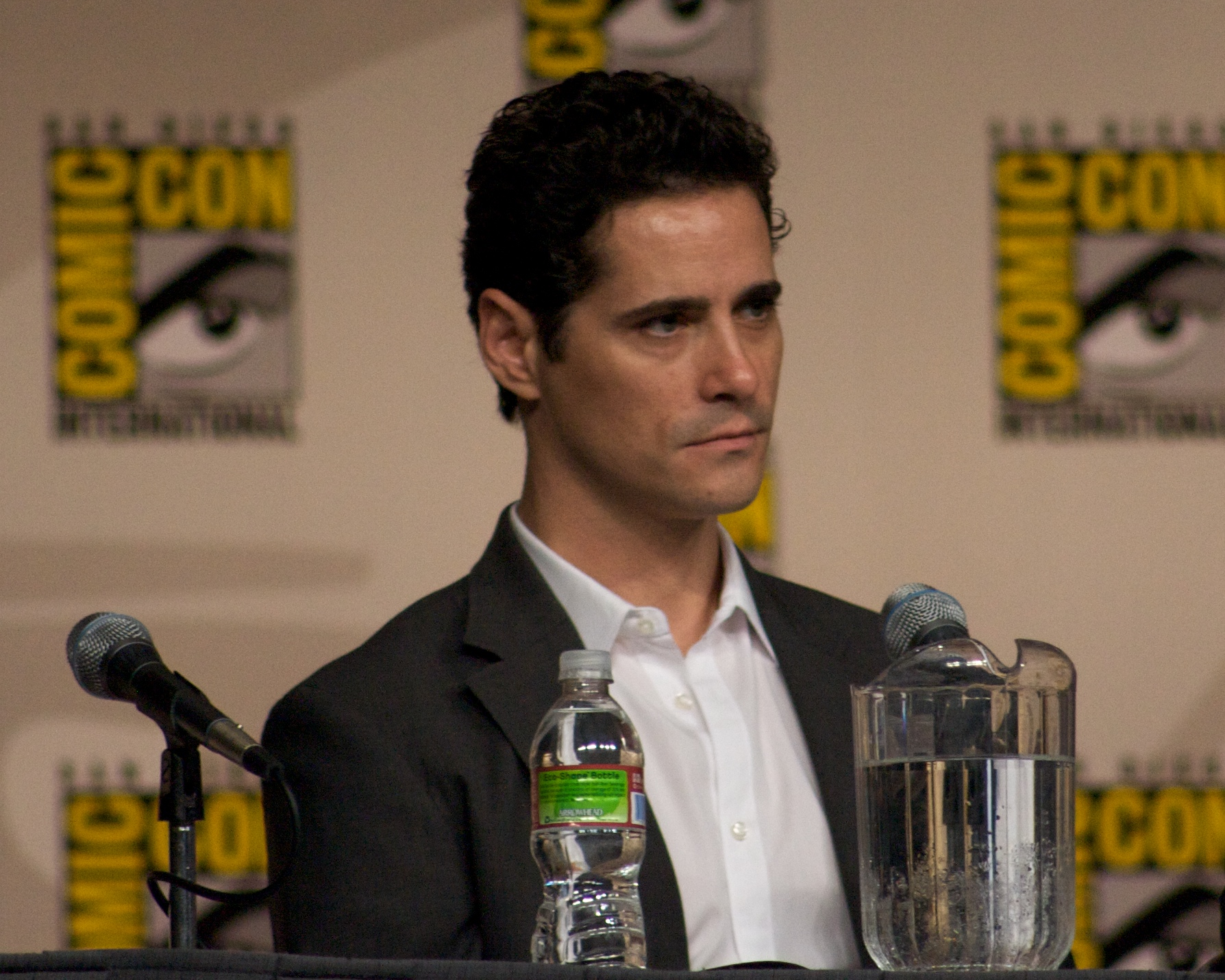
- Seth Peterson (2009)
- Born: August 16, 1970 (age 56); New York City, U.S
- Spouse: Kylee Cochran (m. 2001; sep. 2013)

Seth Peterson (born August 16, 1970) is an American actor, best known for his roles as Robbie Hansen from 1999 until 2002 on the television series Providence and Nate Westen on Burn Notice from 2007 through 2012.

== Personal life ==
Peterson was born in New York City to George Kanouse and Cheryl Peterson.

He married actress Kylee Cochran on May 20, 2001. The couple have three children together. Cochran filed for divorce in late 2013, stating that Peterson "left the marriage" on September 20, 2013, and was, at the time, living with a 22-year-old woman.

== Career ==
In addition to being a series regular on Providence, Peterson had the recurring role of Nate Westen, the brother of lead character Michael Westen, on Burn Notice. He had leading roles in independent features Sedona (2011) and Hate Crime (2005). Other roles include the Hallmark Entertainment Movie of the Week: Hard Ground (2003), in which Peterson co-starred as Burt Reynolds's son Joshua; Godzilla (1998) and Can't Hardly Wait (1998). Notable television guest star roles include such series as NCIS (2003) playing Thomas Pierce in Season 9's episode "Devil's Triangle", Charmed (2003) playing The Beast/Derek in Season 6's episode "Little Monsters", CSI: NY (2004) in the role of Henry Willens in Season 4's episode "Boo" and CSI: Crime Scene Investigation (2000) as Perry Haber in Season 7's "Burn Out" on CBS.

== Poetry ==
Seth started writing poetry in his teen years and lost interest after a while. Shortly after he joined Twitter in March 2011, he was inspired to write and share his poetry again. On February 10, 2013, Seth became a published poet. His book, #Eclection, a top 20 bestseller on Amazon, contains 48 of his best poems written up to its publication date.
