= Lost =

Lost or LOST may refer to getting lost, or to:

== Arts, entertainment, and media ==
=== Television ===
- Lost (TV series), a 2004 American drama series about people who become stranded on a mysterious island
- Lost (2001 TV series), a short-lived American and British reality series
- Lost (South Korean TV series), a 2021 South Korean series
- "Lost" (The Bill), a 1985 episode
- "Lost" (Shameless), an episode of the American TV series Shameless
- "Lost" (Stargate Universe), an episode of science fiction series Stargate Universe
- "Lost", an episode of Unleashed!
- "Lost", an episode of the Canadian documentary TV series Mayday
- "Lost", an episode of Disney's So Weird
- "The Lost" (Class), an episode of the first series of the Doctor Who spin-off series Class

=== Films ===
- Lost (1950 film), a Mexican film directed by Fernando A. Rivero
- Lost (1956 film), a British thriller starring David Farrar
- Lost (1983 film), an American film directed by Al Adamson
- Lost! (film), a 1986 Canadian film directed by Peter Rowe
- Lost (2004 film), an American thriller starring Dean Cain
- The Lost (2006 film), an American psychological horror starring Marc Senter
- Lost (2023 film), an Indian Hindi-language thriller film

=== Literature ===
- Lost (Maguire novel), a 2001 horror/mystery novel by Gregory Maguire
- Lost (Robotham novel), a 2005 Michael Robotham novel
- Lost, a novel by Alice Lichtenstein
- Lost: A Memoir, a 2009 memoir by Canadian author Cathy Ostlere
- The Lost: A Search for Six of Six Million, a 2006 memoir by Daniel Mendelsohn
- The Lost (Durst novel), a 2014 fantasy novel by American author Sarah Beth Durst

=== Music ===
==== Groups and labels ====
- Lost (band), an Italian pop rock band
- The Lost (band), an American garage rock band

==== Albums ====
- Lost (8Ball album), 1998
- Lost (Carpark North album), 2010
- Lost (Cool Calm Pete album), 2005
- Lost (Died Pretty album), 1988
- Lost (Elegy album), 1995
- Lost (RTZ album), 1998
- Lost (Brent Faiyaz EP), 2018
- Lost (Pet Shop Boys EP), 2023

==== Songs ====
- "Lost" (The Badloves song), 1993
- "LosT" (Bring Me The Horizon song). 2023
- "Lost" (Cold Chisel song), 2015
- "Lost" (Faith Hill song), 2007
- "Lost" (Frank Ocean song), 2012
- "Lost" (Gorilla Zoe song), 2008
- "Lost" (Hunter Brothers song), 2018
- "Lost" (Lasgo song), 2009
- "Lost" (Linkin Park song), 2023
- "Lost" (Maroon 5 song), 2021
- "Lost" (Menudo song), 2008
- "Lost" (Michael Bublé song), 2007
- "Lost" (Morrissey song), 1997
- "Lost" (NF song), 2021
- "Lost" (Roger Sanchez song), 2006
- "Lost" (Skin song), 2003
- "Lost" (Vassy and Afrojack song), 2017
- "Lost!", by Coldplay
- "Lost", by Amanda Palmer & the Grand Theft Orchestra from Theatre Is Evil
- "Lost", by Annie Lennox from Songs of Mass Destruction
- "Lost", by Anouk from Hotel New York
- "Lost", by Avenged Sevenfold from Avenged Sevenfold
- "Lost", by the Box Tops from Cry Like a Baby
- "Lost", by BTS from Wings
- "Lost", by Chance the Rapper featuring No name from Acid Rap
- "Lost", by The Church from Starfish
- "Lost", by Clockwork Radio from State of Mind EP
- "Lost", by the Cure from The Cure
- "Lost", by Dead by April from Incomparable
- "Lost", by Delain from April Rain
- "Lost", by Dusty Springfield from A Brand New Me
- "Lost", by Edge of Sanity from The Spectral Sorrows
- "Lost", by (G)I-dle from I Burn
- "Lost", by Haste the Day from Coward
- "Lost", by Katy Perry from One of the Boys
- "Lost", by Killswitch Engage from Killswitch Engage (2009 album)
- "Lost", by Kodaline from Coming Up for Air
- "Lost", by Korn from Life Is Peachy
- "Lost", by Kreator from Cause for Conflict
- "Lost", by Kris Allen from Horizons
- "Lost", by Labyrinth from 6 Days to Nowhere
- "Lost", by the Meat Puppets from Meat Puppets II
- "Lost", by Nevermore from The Politics of Ecstasy
- "Lost", by Neurosis from Enemy of the Sun
- "Lost", by Nik Kershaw from You've Got to Laugh
- "Lost", by Orbital from Blue Album
- "Lost", a 2019 song by Onlychild
- "Lost", by Red from End of Silence
- "Lost", by Reflections from The Fantasy Effect
- "Lost", by Robbie Williams from XXV
- "Lost", by Stabbing Westward from Ungod
- "Lost", by Stream of Passion from Darker Days
- "Lost", by Threshold from Psychedelicatessen
- "Lost", by Tristania from World of Glass
- "Lost", by Uriah Heep from Into the Wild
- "Lost", by Van der Graaf Generator from H to He, Who Am the Only One
- "Lost", by Visions of Atlantis from Cast Away
- "Lost", by Will Haven from Voir Dire
- "Lost", by Within Temptation from The Unforgiving
- "Lost", by The Eden Project from Entrance
- "The Lost", by Hope for the Dying from Aletheia

=== Video games ===
- Lost: Via Domus, a 2008 video game by Ubisoft based on the Lost TV series
- The Lost (video game), a 2002 vaporware game by Irrational Games

== Geography ==
- Lost, Aberdeenshire, a hamlet in Scotland
- Lake Okeechobee Scenic Trail, or LOST, a hiking and cycling trail in Florida, US

== Other uses ==
- Local option sales tax
- Mustard gas, originally known as Lost
- Lost Generation, the social generational cohort that was in early adulthood during World War I
- Abbreviation of lost work, any work which is known to have been created but has not survived to the present day

== See also ==
- Loss (disambiguation)
- Lost Cause (disambiguation)
- Lost River (disambiguation)
- Lost Soul (disambiguation)
- Lost Souls (disambiguation)
