= World War III: Black Gold =

2001 video game

- Developer: Reality Pump
- Publishers: JoWood Productions, TopWare Interactive
- Platform: Windows
- Release: NA: October 16, 2001; PAL: October 26, 2001
- Genre: Real-time strategy
- Modes: Single player, multiplayer

World War III: Black Gold is a real-time strategy video game developed by Reality Pump and published in 2001 by JoWood Productions, and then later republished in 2006 by TopWare Interactive.

== Gameplay ==
The player has the option of playing as Iraq, Russia, or the United States. Each military power has its own unique units, abilities, and corresponding strategies. For example, Iraqi units all have a camouflage ability, allowing them to remain undetected in the absence of radar. The game features multiple linear campaigns spanning across all three military powers, each with 5-10 missions. One unique aspect of the Russian campaign is the presence of a home base that persists throughout the campaign, allowing the player to transport troops back to home base after the conclusion of a mission. There are also skirmish battles which pit the player against either an AI opponent or a human opponent via War.net, a play on Blizzard Entertainment's Battle.net.

In most battles, the player starts out with a basic unit, and buys shafts to pump oil which automatically turns into funds for usage. The troop deployment system is via a landing zone and/or an airport which unlocks and is used to deploy more advanced units. All units in the game have an ammunition counter which, when depleted, renders the unit unable to open fire. To keep units supplied with ammunition, the player must construct a supply depot. Ammunition is distributed via helicopter, included with the construction of the supply depot. There are many other features unique to each military power, including air strikes, bomber strikes, tunnels, et cetera.

The game likely used the same game engine as the game, Earth 2150, released more than a year before by the same developer.

== Critical reception ==
GameSpot awarded Black Gold 8.4 out of 10, praising the AI (particularly in "skirmish" games), combination of grid-based and 3D level design and flexible camera controls. However, the game's manual was criticized for not including enough information about the different units and game interface. IGN rated Black Gold at 6.2 ("passable"). Mike Murphy commented on the "illogical" use of military units, with the game's armaments and strategies not matching their real-world counterparts for the sake of gameplay balance. He also criticized the AI's pathfinding, but found the game's graphics and sound to be "nice".
