= Polanie (video game) =

1996 video game

- Polish DOS cover art for the enhanced CD version from 1997
- Developer: MDF
- Publisher: USER
- Designer: Mirosław Dymek
- Platforms: DOS, Windows
- Release: 1996
- Genre: Real-time strategy

Polanie is a historical real-time strategy video game developed by MDF and published by USER for DOS and Microsoft Windows in 1996. An enhanced CD version was released the following year.

It was the first Polish RTS game and has been since described as a cult classic in Poland. It was followed by Polanie II in 2003. The planned third game, Polanie 3, eventually turned into an unrelated action RPG Two Worlds. A remake of the original was announced in 2014, but has since been cancelled.

== Gameplay ==
The game offered 25 missions, based around the plot of fictional Polan tribal leader Mirek, who returns from an expedition to his hometown only to find it in ruins. Throughout the game, Mirek will try to rebuild his country, defeat enemies, and conquer new lands. The game has fantasy elements, including magic and spell-wielding units. The game economy is based around a single resource, milk, produced by cows which roam regenerating grasslands (therefore unlike some other games, the resources in Polanie can never be exhausted). Military units are expensive to produce, and battles often involve only a few units on each side.

== Development and release ==
Polanie was designed by a team of several young Poles headed by Mirosław Dymek, developed by MDF and released by Hurtownia Oprogramowania USER. When they were designing the game, Dymek and the developer team were students at the AGH University of Science and Technology in Kraków. They did not expect to profit from game sales, but instead saw the game as an entry in their portfolio.

The game was released on floppy disk. An enhanced edition in 1997 was released on CD-ROM, adding new missions (five new scenarios in addition to the one from the base game) and new units. The game was released in Polish, Czech (as Osadnici) and German (as VICTORY). An unofficial English mod called Slaves for the floppy disk version of the game was rumored to exist at one time.

== Reception ==
The game received the award for Best Debut during the 1996 Play-Box trade show in Katowice. Reviews praised innovative and amusing elements, such as the presence of animals like cows and bears. The plot of the game was also positively reviewed, and described as interesting, particular due to the fact some missions instead of regular build and conquer required the player to complete specific objectives, such as leading a cow to a sacrificial altar. Several reviewers criticized the simplistic and underwhelming graphics. The lack of multiplayer functionality was also criticized.

== Legacy ==
While the game sold only 6,000 copies, it was considered a surprisingly good record for that time and place, and the game has been since been described as a cult classic in Poland. There, the game has been frequently compared to the international hit Warcraft from 1994, and while reviewers noted it is not strictly better, Polish fans appreciated the game lore tying it to Polish prehistory and Slavic mythology.

In 2003, a sequel, Polanie II for Windows environment, was released. A real-time strategy like its predecessor, it was distributed in English as KnightShift.

A second sequel, Polanie 3 or KnightShift 2: Curse of Souls, was announced in 2004. A playable demo was already available in 2004, with plans for a release in 2005. It was to be a role-playing video game, abandoning its real-time strategy roots, for the PC, PlayStation 3 and Xbox 360 platforms. The game was never released under that title. The project however did develop into a high fantasy action role-playing game Two Worlds, released in 2007, which itself got a sequel, Two Worlds II, in 2011. While the developer team traced the game's continuity to the 1996 game, very few fans realized the connection between those titles.

In 2014, a remake of the original game for Android, iPhone and PC, tentatively titled Polanie Remake, was announced, with a planned release date of 2016 for the 20th anniversary of the original game. It was delayed and eventually cancelled in 2018.
