= Earth 2140 =

1997 video game

- European cover art
- Developer(s): Reality Pump Studios
- Publisher(s): EU: TopWare Interactive; NA: Interplay Productions
- Composer(s): Joachim Schäfer
- Series: Earth
- Platform(s): Amiga, MS-DOS, Macintosh, Windows
- Release: 1997: MS-DOS; 2001: Amiga, Macintosh
- Genre(s): Strategy
- Mode(s): Single-player, multiplayer

Earth 2140 is a 2D real-time strategy computer game created in 1997 by Polish-based Reality Pump Studios and published by TopWare Interactive (later acquired by Zuxxez Entertainment). It has two sequels, Earth 2150 and Earth 2160.

== Plot ==
Earth 2140 takes place in the year 2140. In the year 2048, a global nuclear holocaust had engulfed Earth and reduced its surface into a nuclear wasteland, forcing most of the world's population into underground cities. Tensions rise between the Earth's two major factions, the Eurasian Dynasty (ED) and the United Civilized States (UCS), as both sides vie for the world's steadily dwindling resources. A UCS raid on an ED base is enough to ignite the rivalry into full-scale war as the ED fails in its bid to control Mexico and the UCS counterattacks Scandinavia, Great Britain, France, and the Iberian Peninsula.

== Factions ==
The United Civilized States (UCS) controls all of North and South America, Western Europe, North Africa and Australia. This nation is populated mostly by hedonists, due to the near-complete automation of the workforce. Automated butlers are the standard in UCS households; even politics and war are left up to the machines. As such, UCS citizens are often portrayed by their detractors as decadent "pigs". A glitch in the upgrade of the UCS war processor GOLAN caused the giant robot to miscalculate the military strength of the Eurasian Dynasty, thus compelling it to launch an attack on the ED. After losing several battles in Mexico, GOLAN quickly adapted to the ED threat and began to retake lost ED territory and win battles in Europe. The UCS is generally more technologically advanced than its adversary, employing robot infantry and automated bipedal combat vehicles (more commonly known as mechas).

The Eurasian Dynasty (ED) controls Eastern Europe and Asia. The antithesis of the UCS, the ED is run by an autocratic monarchy under the Khan Dynasty that often makes life harsh, short, and without luxury for its citizens. As the less technologically advanced of the two factions, the ED utilizes cyborgs, traditional 20th/21st century standard vehicles such as tanks, and armed helicopters in its arsenal. Because of its technological disadvantage, the ED finds itself more often on the defensive throughout the Earth 2140 storyline.

== Gameplay ==
Earth 2140 requires the player to complete various objectives, mostly destroying all opposing units and structures (or capturing them). Failure of missions happens when all the player's units are wiped out or a vital objective is not met. Structures are built by deploying mobile vehicles on suitable terrain. Mines used to fund the player with money for purchasing can only be built where ore is available. Materials used to gain funds at 1000 credits a piece are carried from a mine (or material on ground) by a BANTHA truck or Heavy Lifter and placed at the Refinery and converted into credits. Mines eventually finish when all ore is extracted.

Each faction has four types of units. The player can create up to 5 queued units and even an infinite queue of the same unit. Unlike most strategy games, credits cannot be refunded when recruitment is cancelled and structures cannot be sold. In some missions, it is possible to call for reinforcements only once. Structures can only be removed with self-destruction. All structures except the Construction Center require power from power plants. Lack of power will cause buildings to operate slowly. Destruction of a power plant leaves a permanent scar on the terrain, which drains vitality of any units nearby. Certain types of buildings must be built to enable the player to build others and to recruit more types of units and vehicles, especially the Research Center. To capture an enemy structure, the player must send in enough units to overwhelm enemy units in garrison. Capturing the opposing faction's factories enables the player to make use of otherwise unavailable technology (depending on the research center progress). Guard towers and superweapon launchers cannot be captured. Most of the units and vehicles just move, attack and escort, but certain ones serve with special tasks such as mine laying, cargo carrying and others. Not every vehicle is land-based. A unique feature in the game is that a vehicle once disabled (easily accomplished with ion technology) can be reprogrammed to join the player using a HMCR repair vehicle.

== Expansion packs ==
Two expansion packs were released for this game:

- Earth 2140: Mission Pack 1
- Earth 2140: Mission Pack 2 - Final Conflict

== Reception ==
Reception

Review score
| Publication | Score |
|---|---|
| GameSpot | 6.3/10 |

GameSpot gave the game a 6.3 out of ten. Brendan Caldwell from Rock, Paper, Shotgun called the game an imitator of Command & Conquer.
