= Polanie =

Polanie may refer to:

- Polans (western) or Polanie, a West Slavic tribe in the Warta River basin of the historic Greater Poland region
- Polans (eastern) or Polanie, an East Slavic tribe that inhabited both sides of the Dnieper river
- Polanie (video game), a 1996 Polish video game
