= Earth 2150: Lost Souls =

2001 video game

- Developer: TopWare Interactive
- Publishers: GER: Blackstar Interactive; NA: Strategy First; UK: Oxygen Interactive
- Platform: Microsoft Windows
- Release: GER: December 5, 2001; NA: September 11, 2002; UK: October 11, 2002
- Genre: Strategy
- Modes: Single-player, multiplayer

Earth 2150: Lost Souls is the second sequel to the real time strategy game Earth 2150. While it is a stand-alone game, many consider it the second expansion pack because it does little more than provide new missions, and weapons. The story takes place alongside the original game's story. Lost Souls was released in 2001.

== Premise ==
Earth's final war is in full swing. The United Civilized States, Eurasian Dynasty, and the Lunar Corporation fight over what is left of the world's resources in order to escape the blue planet before it is destroyed. After most of Earth's citizens escaped with the evacuation ships, the people left behind became known as the Lost Souls. They didn't give up on escape and continued to fight amongst each other. They hoped to scrape together the dying planet's meager resources and find a way to escape and get revenge on those who had left them behind.

== Story ==
The game plays nearly the same as Earth 2150 with new campaigns. Unlike the original game, the campaigns are now tied together in a chronological order:

=== Part I - ED campaign ===
General Fedorov, General of the Mobile Team (MEK) is called upon by Czar Vladimir II to gather crucial resources from Lunar Corporation territory in Finland in order to complete manufacturing of the space shuttle electronics. As the LC base was heavily defended, Fedorov took a detour, attacking the base from the east side where it was most vulnerable. His next task was to defeat a UCS incursion in Korea. The Czar theorised that the reason behind this attack was that it was a major production center, intended to build a strike force to destroy the shuttle silos in China, stranding their enemy on the dying planet.

The egotistic Czar sent Fedorov on a counter offensive in Bulgaria against the massive UCS presence there. Although Fedorov knew that this attack was ill-advised at the least, he carried it out, destroying a major UCS base but suffering heavy casualties. He was surprised to learn that there were traitors in their midst, who had an encampment in Russia. Begrudgingly, he took a platoon of heavy armor to deal with this threat, which turned out to be a foul trick. The alleged "traitors" were the forces of General Ivanov, a long-time friend of Fedorov and loyal to Vladimir II. While the two were confused over why the Czar wanted them to kill each other, they were ambushed by loyalist forces. After destroying their base of operations, the generals learned about Vladimir's plan: the shuttles were only able to carry about one million people to Mars, which was only a fraction of the total Eurasian population. As such, Vladimir planned to only take his most loyal minions with him. The popularity of the two generals have risen recently, while his waned and he didn't want to risk losing his power in space due to a coup. For that reason, he wanted to leave both of them behind. Obviously, the generals couldn't let this happen.

The rebels planned an attack against a dam in the middle of the former Russia as a ruse. They knew that downriver was a major agricultural area where food supplies for the shuttles were being grown. By destroying the dam, the ensuing flood would destroy most of these and delay the launch. In addition, this act of terrorism would draw away enough forces from China to attempt an attack on the launch complex. Their plan was successful, but there were two problems: the response teams were larger than expected, and UCS troops appeared in the region. The rebels quickly deduced that the UCS had something in the area which the loyalists did not want to fall into rebel hands, which turned out to be a cache of UCS research data previously hidden underwater.

The response teams also served as a delay: by the time the generals reached the launch complex, they had only two and a half days to capture China's most heavily defended installation (although this later turned out to be false intelligence; the mission is impossible to do in the allotted time, so the developers removed the limit but "left" in a fake timer). When they finally succeeded, they learned that they were fooled yet again. The silos were empty. Some time later, the generals witnessed the shuttles blast off from behind a nearby mountain range.

General Fedorov fell into lethargy and pessimism at their failure, but Ivanov did not give up. He noticed that the LC forces in Europe – which were left behind as well – were furiously working on something. After capturing data from an installation in Poland, Ivanov realized that the LC found a way to get off the planet. They attacked the primary LC installation in France with full force to capture the project, not realizing that by doing so, they endangered it because their scientists could not complete it in time to escape.

=== Part II - LC campaign ===
Since the escaping LC high command took their most experienced commanders with them, the remaining LC forces were forced to entrust their primary research complex' defense to a new recruit. The newcomer performed excellently, even leading a counterattack and driving ED out of the area. They did not give up yet, as LC spies discovered an ED base still under construction in Ukraine where the next series of attack were expected. The base was protected by four artillery batteries which made the recruit's task even harder, as she couldn't bring in heavier equipment until they were got rid of.

The staff then revealed their plan to the recruit: the evacuation plan involved construction of an advanced space teleporter. There were problems with the transport module and it did not function properly. The scientists theorised that they can get what they need by stealing the UCS' teleportation technology. The UCS started to abandon their European bases and withdraw to America. Their central computer, GOLAN, monitored all transmissions, so they had to act quickly and stealthily. They managed to sneak in a force into America from Portugal, but not without problems. The UCS was seemingly aware of their plans, evidenced by a massive attack in Portugal and the fact that their troops were gathering near the LC landing site.

The LC found an unexpected source of help: a group of UCS rebels who agreed to help capturing the data they need in exchange for LC help in eliminating GOLAN. They left to Florida, where the main UCS research base was located. The rebels provided a camouflaged Cargo Salamander which the LC sneaked into the research base. Although they had what they need, the LC had yet to fulfill their part of the bargain. GOLAN's core was protected by a number of countermeasures which had to be deactivated before technicians can deactivate the AI itself. For this reason, the LC broke into a Chinese research lab and stole ED's Ion Cannon tech as their own Electro Cannon would cause structural damage, triggering even more defensive measures.

GOLAN reacted quickly. His forces attacked the central LC base in America whose loss could push the LC out of America permanently. The recruit was called upon once again and her extraordinary battle tactics won the day. The next task was to get rebel technicians into GOLAN's core located in the Rocky Mountains and they knew nothing about its defenses.

With GOLAN out of the way, the LC had to prove in one more test of mettle. The supposed UCS rebels spread all over Europe and suddenly attacked LC bases all over the continent. They were already in Germany and if they were not stopped there, they could have captured the space teleporter in Poland which had been finished. After the attack, the LC found evidence that these forces were commanded by GOLAN itself, who had not truly been deactivated.

=== Part III - UCS campaign ===
The rebels were in the ranks of the UCS, but not those forces the LC believed to be. They were led by Marcus Grodin, a former high-ranking official. They were based in Mexico, but LC forces surrounded their base and blocked the mountain passages until a larger force can arrive and lay siege. They forgot about one route: the tunnel system. Grodin evaded the LC blockade and fled towards north, LC forces in tow, to a mountain pass. They fortified it and defeated their pursuers.

Grodin's next plan was to break into GOLAN's deactivated headquarters and gather evidence that they were innocent in GOLAN's treacherous attack against the LC escape project. As the place was defended by hordes of LC and ED troops (they obviously allied with each other), direct attack was out of the question. A small ED base was nearby however, with some tanks the rebels were going to capture and drive to GOLAN's headquarters.

Grodin found out that there was another group of UCS troops nearby. When they got there, ED stormtroopers had already taken the base and were in pursuit of the fleeing UCS forces. They managed to fortify themselves on a plateau, but were under siege from ED forces. Grodin attacked the ED, freeing his trapped comrades and showing that they were on the same side. The other group attacked them and fled into the tunnels, which made Grodin even more curious as to who they were.

Not hearing about the other group for some time, the rebels returned to their own plans. Venezuela was chosen as the new target, as there was an ED base there under construction. A convoy was due filled with building materials. The rebels attacked while the convoy was in the base. Earth was starting to be shaken by the massive tidal forces of the Sun, forcing them to hurry up. The ED and the LC already started to break down their American camps and ship their forces to Europe where the last chance to escape was located, so the UCS had to do this as well. They couldn't contact their foes because of GOLAN's radio jamming and the Atlantic coast was firmly in the hands of the alliance. Because of that, Grodin was forced to destroy two extremely heavily defended bases near New York.

When reaching Great Britain, Grodin managed to contact the LC and explain the situation. Naturally, they did not trust them at all but they wanted to check their evidence. Seeing that they were innocent, the UCS was accepted into the alliance against GOLAN. GOLAN's forces used their huge tunnel system to reach Belarus unnoticed, probably to take out the ED base there. When the UCS forces arrived there, GOLAN already built a powerful base which Grodin eliminated, because the ED could not afford to lose that position. It turned out however, that Belarus was only a decoy. GOLAN managed to slip the bulk of his forces into Poland and capture the LC research base. Although the space teleporter was still intact, GOLAN built a massive base around it. This time Grodin was not alone; both the ED and the LC joined the fray against GOLAN and defeated it in a cataclysmic final battle. The bad news then followed: GOLAN was ordered by the UCS High Command, the LC Celestial Council and Czar Vladimir II to stop the Lost Souls from following them at all costs. They probably feared their wrath and not without reason. Now that the battle was over, the Lost Souls prepared to enter the space teleporter, knowing that it could very well malfunction and deposit them with their particles shattered in space, which did not happen. In the UCS campaign of the sequel, Earth 2160, the Lost Souls are found on an uncharted world outside the Solar System.

== Gameplay ==
As Lost Souls is a standalone expansion, its gameplay is similar to that of the previous expansion pack, The Moon Project. The only real difference is that the campaign missions were heavily criticized by fans because the AI adapted from a strategy of constant harassing to heavy ground and air assaults nearly constantly. Most maps can only be won with a war of attrition: the player can fortify their position and wait until the AI runs out of resources, at which point it tries to get the player's. If the player can stop this, the AI becomes vulnerable to attack, aside from the frequent reinforcements.

Another major difference in difficulty is that the AI always start with a fully built and heavily fortified base. On Medium difficulty, the computer also gets a main base, just like the player. A major counter to this is that the player neither need to send resources back to the main base for evacuation fleet construction nor work with a time limit. Resources are abundant on each map and unused resources are automatically sent back to the main base's resource pool at the end of the mission.

The factions are the same as in Earth 2150 and The Moon Project.

== Reception ==
The game received a score of 80% from PC Gamer US.
