= Lost Souls =

Lost Souls or The Lost Souls may refer to:

== Film, television, and radio ==
- Lost Souls (1980 film), a Hong Kong film produced by Shaw Brothers
- The Lost Souls (film) [zh], a 1991 Hong Kong film produced by Golden Harvest
- Lost Souls (1998 film), an American television film directed by Jeff Woolnough
- Lost Souls (2000 film), an American film directed by Janusz Kamiński
- "Lost Souls" (Arrow), a 2015 television episode
- "Lost Souls" (Supergirl), a 2021 television episode
- "Lost Souls", a 1998 episode of Voltron: The Third Dimension
- "Lost Souls" (Torchwood), a 2008 radio episode of the BBC TV series

== Games ==
- Lost Souls (MUD), a text-based online role-playing game
- Lost Souls (role-playing game), a 1991 pen and paper role-playing game
- Dark Fall: Lost Souls, the 2009 third installment in the Dark Fall adventure game series
- Earth 2150: Lost Souls, a 2002 expansion to the computer game Earth 2150

== Literature ==
- Splendeurs et misères des courtisanes, sometimes translated as Lost Souls, an 1838–1847 novel by Balzac
- Lost Souls, a 1981–1983 serialized version of Meshugah by Isaac Bashevis Singer
- Lost Souls (Brite novel), a 1992 horror novel by Poppy Z. Brite
- Lost Souls (Koontz novel), a 2010 Frankenstein novel by Dean Koontz
- Lost Souls, a 2010 book by Lena Herzog
- Lost Souls, in Marvel Comics, a tribe of the fictional superhumans the Neo
- Lost Souls: Soviet Displaced Persons and the Birth of the Cold War, a 2024 book by Sheila Fitzpatrick

== Music ==
=== Albums ===
- Lost Souls (The Raindogs album), 1990
- Lost Souls (Doves album) or the title song, 2000
- The Lost Souls, by Niraj Chag, 2009
- Lost Souls (Loreena McKennitt album) or the title song, 2018
- Lost Souls, an EP by Knife Party, 2019
- Lost Souls (Vory album), 2022

=== Songs ===
- "Lost Souls", by 2Pac and Outlawz from Gang Related – The Soundtrack, 1997
- "Lost Souls", by Book of Love, B-side of "I Touch Roses", 1985
- "Lost Souls", by Born of Osiris from Angel or Alien, 2021
- "Lost Souls", by Pestilence from Testimony of the Ancients, 1991
- "The Lost Souls", by AFI from The Art of Drowning, 2000
- "The Lost Souls", by Asking Alexandria from The Black, 2016

== See also ==
- Lost Soul (disambiguation)
