= Raven's Cry =

2015 action adventure video game

- Developer: Reality Pump Studios
- Publisher: TopWare Interactive
- Director: Alexandra Constandache
- Producer: Adam Salawa
- Programmer: Jacek Sikora
- Artist: Grzegorz Siemczuk
- Composers: Victor Stoyanov; Sebastian Dierkes
- Engine: Vision
- Platforms: Windows, macOS, Linux
- Release: WW: 30 January 2015; Vendetta: Curse of Raven's Cry: WW: 20 November 2015
- Genres: Action-adventure, role-playing
- Mode: Single-player

Raven's Cry is a 2015 action-adventure video game that interweaves fictional events and characters with historical ones from the 17th-century Caribbean. The game features historically accurate architecture and pirates. Raven's Cry follows the character of Christopher Raven, who was the only survivor of an attack by pirates and is now seeking vengeance. Upon release, the game was panned by critics, and considered one of the worst video games of 2015.

An updated version of the game was released as Vendetta: Curse of Raven's Cry on 20 November 2015.

== Gameplay ==
The story is divided into chapters. In these chapters, Christopher, the player controlled character, is tracking down a particular pirate known as Neville Scranton, who he blames for leading some former pirates who took part in the massacre of the only people he has ever loved.

Raven's Cry also features role-playing game elements, including morality system, side-quests, and magic items, which can increase character attributes, including "being brave", "fear" and "notoriety".

== Plot ==
When he was a boy, Christopher Callahan's father, mother, and brother were massacred by a group of four pirates known as the Devil's Tines, led by Captain Neville "the Devil" Scranton. Neville cuts off Christopher's hand and leaves him for dead. He is rescued by a former slave turned outlaw, Marcus, who raises him as his own child. Christopher changes his name to Christopher Raven and grows up to be a ruthless and amoral pirate captain. He plans to seek revenge against the Devil's Tines, but is robbed of the opportunity when they are presumed killed during the 1692 Jamaica earthquake that sinks Port Royal into the ocean.

Some years later, after being tasked with assassinating a rival by the Spanish officer Tirado, Christopher is betrayed by Tirado and his ship and crew sunk. After acquiring a new ship, Christopher and Marcus stumble upon an adrift Dutch schooner with the crew massacred and the Captain impaled to the ship's wheel with a sword through the mouth. Recognizing this as the same way his own father was killed, Christopher realizes that Neville is responsible and is still alive. He vows to seek out Neville and have his revenge, in spite of Marcus advising him against doing so.

To locate Neville, Christopher seeks an alliance with the infamous vigilante pirate hunter Santorio. After helping Santorio defend his island base from a French navy attack, Christopher learns from Santorio that one of the Devil's Tines, Weedy, has been seen living as a drunken vagrant in the pirate hideout of Redonda. Christopher confronts and kills Weedy, learning that the Tines other than Neville have all retired and that another one of the Tines, Bloodfist Brady, has spent the last few years being cared for at a monastery on Blanco Island due to suffering from multiple debilitating illnesses and STDs. Christopher travels to the monastery only to find it burned to the ground by cannibal natives. He tries to retrieve Brady from the natives, but Brady is killed by them before Christopher can learn anything from him. In the process Christopher is also poisoned by a native arrow, becoming deathly ill.

Charlotte, a nun that Christopher rescued from the destruction of the monastery, takes Christopher to the friendly Carrac tribe of Aves Island, where the shaman Arko puts Christopher through a hallucinatory ordeal before sending him into an ancient temple where the cure for the poison is located. After being cured, Christopher learns from Charlotte that Brady spoke of his past and that the third member of the Devil's Tines and Neville's right-hand man, Kensington, is located at the Arriya plantation on St. John island.

Christopher arrives at Arriya to find that the place has been taken over by Edward Avery, a wealthy businessman and rival of Kensington's. Christopher learns from Avery that Kensington has become a member of the Patriarchs, a shadowy cabal of wealthy and influential power brokers who secretly rule the Virgin Islands; Avery wishes to usurp Kensington's place among the Patriarchs, and Christopher undertakes a series of missions for him to undermine Kensington's position among them in order to weaken him enough so that he can be attacked. This culminates with Christopher assisting Marcus' Maroon companions in starting an uprising to free Kensingon's slaves and overthrow him. However, upon the successful completion of his mission Christopher is betrayed and captured by Avery, who is secretly in league with Neville. Christopher is rescued by Marcus and the Maroons, and Christopher leads his crew in attacking and burning down Arriya; in the process Christopher kills Avery's bodyguard Ray and leaves a crippled Avery behind to die in the fire.

Christopher finally confronts Kensington, who has lost everything due to Avery's manipulations, and learns that Neville is sailing to attack Santorio. After executing Kensington, Christopher learns that Marcus was injured during the uprising and has returned to his home in St. Lucia. When he goes to visit Marcus, Marcus confesses that he had been hired by Neville to locate Christopher's father and that he was the one who led him to Christopher's family. Christopher can choose to either kill Marcus in revenge, or spare him without forgiving him.

Santorio is still too weakened from the French attack to fight Neville, so he gives Christopher his flagship ship of the line with which to engage against Neville's warship. After crippling the warship, Christopher boards it and confronts Neville, killing him after a prolonged duel. If Christopher had spared Marcus, he will attempt to throw away the marble he has kept as a keepsake from the day his family was killed, but his raven will retrieve it and give it back, prompting Christopher to remark that he should be able to live with his past now; he then tells his men that the fight is over. If Christopher had killed Marcus, he will throw the marble away and urge his men to wipe out the remainder of Neville's crew.

== Development ==
The original idea and most of the work for the game was done by Octane Games, which is a subsidiary company of Nitro Games. The first public announcement for the game happened in 2011 when Octane Games told the local press about it. They also mentioned that Topware Interactive would publish the game.

Octane Games failed to keep up with development timetables, and in 2013, after many delays, TopWare Interactive made a "tough decision to reorganize the project", which meant that Reality Pump would finish up the game.

The game was also in development for Xbox 360, PlayStation 3 and PlayStation 4.

== Reception ==
Reception

Aggregate scores
Aggregator	Score
GameRankings	25.71%
Metacritic	27/100

Review scores
Publication	Score
GameSpot	1/10
IGN	3/10

Upon release, Raven's Cry was widely panned by critics. The game received an aggregated score of 25.71% on GameRankings based on 7 reviews; and 27/100 on Metacritic based on 16 reviews, indicating a "generally unfavorable" reception. The game was accused of being released in an unfinished state, due to large chunks of missing content and a large amount of technical issues (such as numerous bugs and glitches, frequent crashing, frame-rate stuttering, character's dialogue files often not playing during cutscenes, and bad NPC animations). The game was also criticized for its difficult to follow and uninspired plot, outdated graphics, clunky controls and combat, sexist, homophobic and racist writing, lack of tutorials, poor voice acting, and generally boring gameplay.

Raven's Cry received a 1/10 score from GameSpot, the lowest possible score on the site, for its "rampant racism, sexism, and homophobia", broken gameplay, and "button-mashing tedium". Brandin Tyrrel, writing for IGN, gave the game a 3/10, citing its inconsistent dialogue, clunky combat, rigid control and game-stopping crashes. He summarized the review by saying that "I genuinely do think the potential for a good pirate game is in here, somewhere, but Raven's Cry is a mess of bugs, hazards, hiccups, oversights, and progression-halting crashes. If you never set foot on land, its ship-to-ship combat might be respectable, but this adventure insists on taking you places no self-respecting pirate captain should go."

Daniel Starky, writing for Eurogamer, recommended that people avoid this game. He criticized the plot, stating that "tension and drama is soon lost [...] as the plot drops for a noxious cocktail of clichés." He also labeled the combat as bland and dismissed the open world concept, stating that "Raven's Cry wants so desperately to have an open world, but never quite understands why". Allegra Frank of Polygon named it one of the worst video games of 2015.

== Re-release ==
As a result of the original game's poor critical and community reception, Reality Pump announced on 19 October 2015 that they were planning to re-release the game under the title Vendetta: Curse of Raven's Cry. The new version features new gameplay mechanics, voice-overs, missions, weapons and upgrades. It was released on 20 November 2015, and players of the original Raven's Cry received the new version as a free update. However, the re-release also received negative reviews.

Vendetta: Curse of Raven's Cry was suddenly pulled from Steam on 28 January 2016. Neither TopWare nor Reality Pump released any official explanation for this, however it has been speculated that allegations of "fake" positive reviews were what led to the game's removal from sale. As of July 2016, however, the game has been restored to the Steam Store.

== See also ==
- List of video games notable for negative reception
