= Lost Soul =

Lost Soul may refer to:

- Lost Soul (band), a Polish technical death metal band
- "Lost Soul" (song), a 1990 song by Bruce Hornsby and the Range
- Lost Soul (play), a 2007 play by David Kirby
- Lost Souls, a 2000 film
- Lost Soul: The Doomed Journey of Richard Stanley's Island of Dr. Moreau, a 2014 documentary about the making of the 1996 film The Island of Dr. Moreau
- Lost Soul Mountain, a summit in Montana, United States
- Lost Soul, an alternative title for the 1977 film The Forbidden Room
- Lost Soul, a 2009 film starring Nick Mancuso
- Lost Soul, a flying creature in the video game Doom 3: Resurrection of Evil
- Lost souls, a character type in the 2020 film Soul

== See also ==
- Little Lost Soul, an album by Matt Elliott recording as The Third Eye Foundation
- Lost (disambiguation)
- Lost Souls (disambiguation)
- Soul
