= Polanie II =

2003 video game

- Cover art for the title as named "KnightShift"
- Developer: Reality Pump Studios
- Publisher: Topware Interactive
- Directors: Mirosław Dymek; Janusz Grzyb; Daniel Duplaga
- Producer: Alexandra Constandache
- Designers: Mirosław Dymek; Alexandra Constandache; Dirk P. Hassinger
- Programmers: Jacek Sikora; Maciej Kordas; Konrad Kwiatkowski
- Artists: Alexandra Constandache; Jerzy Kowalik
- Platforms: Windows, OS X
- Genres: Real-time strategy, role-playing

Polanie II, also known as KnightShift and Once Upon a Knight, is a real-time strategy and role-playing video game hybrid developed by Reality Pump Studios and released by Topware Interactive for the PC Windows and OS X in 2003. The game is a follow-up to Polanie, published by USER in 1996. KnightShift (Director's Cut Special Edition) was released for Windows later in 2003.

== Gameplay ==
The game is a mixture of an action RPG and a real time strategy. There are three main modes: RPG, Skirmish (which uses pure strategy format with no RPG elements) and Campaigns, which combines both elements. As an RTS, the game contains all elements expected of the genre - player needs to build up their base and gather resources necessary to create new buildings and units, balancing fighting the enemy with running a successful economy. Unique to this game is the fact that there is only one playable faction - the Polans tribe - and there is only one resource, milk. Milk is used for every task in the game that has a resource cost. In the RPG mode, the game turns into an action RPG similar to Diablo - the player selects one of several character classes, and battles enemies for gold. There is no strategy elements in RPG mode. During Campaigns, the game switches between RTS style and RPG style depending on the storyline. You control hero units like in RPG mode, but you can also sometimes control other buildings and units like in RTS mode. Usually, death of the main leader means game over.

== Plot ==
The game is a direct sequel to original Polanie. However, character names were changed in English release to remove the association. The main character of the campaigns is Mirko, prince of Polans from the first game (in Knightshift, his name was changed to John). In the intro cinematic, evil wizard Koschei (in English - Valtamand) sends him to the interdimensional void between life and death, and causes him to lose his memory. Koshchei rules the land in his stead as a ruthless tyrant, turning the land into desert full of undead and the possessed. After five years pass, with help of the Slavic gods, sage Dobromir (in English - Gallus) managed to bring Prince back from the void, and sends him on a quest to restore his princedom. He has to gather his old warriors, now hiding in the forest and topple Koschei from his usurped throne, while regaining his full skills, and gathering his old arms and equipment on the way. During his quest, he finds that Koshchei is looking for three magical Jewels of Power to gain ultimate power. While looking into mystery of an anointend child and reuniting with his old friend Mieszko, Mirko is met by Koschei in person. Evil wizard sends his army after Prince's party, forcing them to flee. Later, Dobromir tells them that Koshchei already found first of the Jewels and his power grows by the minute. While looking for the next Jewel, hoping to find it before the villain, they learn that Jewels is a heart of a dragon, split into three parts by priests of Svarog. While looking in a temple of Svarog for the second Jewel, he finds it stolen and is ambushed, and has to run away. A friend of Dobromir, priest Dużomysł tells our heroes that a band of undead has attacked the temple and kidnapped the priests - and they might be the only way to learn location of the final Jewel. After rescuing the priest, they rescue a giant Waligóra, and in return get told location of the final jewel by a friendly wizard. Leaving their troops behind, Mieszko and Prince Mirko head into the dungeon holding the final Jewel. Inside, Koschei casts a spell on reckless Mieszko, forcing him to turn on the prince and try to fight him. Mirko is forced to slay him, and Mieszko in dying words reveals he unwittingly allowed Koshchei to send the prince away all these years ago. Prince heads on alone, but the fight slowed him down, allowing the dark wizard to grab the final Jewel, tauning Mirko in his face before teleporting away. The final last ditch attempt is to use a Dragon Sword to destroy the Jewels in an all-out assault on Koschei's fortress. Mirko destroys the three Jewels - Jewel of Bone, Jewel of Water, Jewel of Fire. In a final showdown with Koshchei, he reveals the truth - he was the anointed child all along, and Mirko's half-brother. In a final, comical cutscene, Koshchei accidentally casts a spell on himself, and flies away in a puff of smoke. Mirko then recovers his right to the princely throne.

In the second campaign, after a siege on the neighbouring town, princess Milawa is kidnapped by the Veletians. Mirko rescues an unicorn, and then princess herself. After defeating remaining Veleti forces, Milava and Mirko marry in a grand wedding.

In the final campaign, Polans' land is menaced by a dragon, and Mirko has to find weapons that can pierce dragon's scale. After finding these magical items, Mirko slays the dragon and restores peace to the land.

== Legacy ==
A sequel, Polanie 3 or KnightShift 2: Curse of Souls, was announced in 2004. A playable demo was already available in 2004, with plans for a release in 2005. It was supposed to be a computer rpg-type game, abandoning its real-time strategy roots. The game was supposed to be available for the PC, PlayStation 3 and Xbox 360 platforms. The game was never released under that name. However, it eventually lost all of its RTS elements and morphed into a computer role-playing game released in 2007 as Two Worlds.
