= TopWare Interactive =

German video game publisher

TopWare Interactive – AC Enterprises e.K.
- Company type: Private
- Industry: Video games
- Founded: 1996; 29 years ago
- Headquarters: Karlsruhe, Germany
- Products: Earth series Two Worlds series Raven's Cry
- Parent: TopWare CD-Service AG (1996–2001); Zuxxez Entertainment (2001–2016)
- Divisions: Reality Pump Studios
- Website: topware.com

TopWare Interactive – AC Enterprises e.K. is a German video game publisher based in Karlsruhe. The company is best known for publishing the Two Worlds series developed by its Reality Pump Studios division.

== History ==
TopWare Interactive was started in 1995 as a video game publishing subsidiary of TopWare CD Service AG based in Mannheim, Germany, which included two inhouse development studios (ToonTRAXX and TopWare Programy), which was later renamed to Reality Pump Studios based in Poland. In February 2001, TopWare CD Service AG filed for bankruptcy. All rights, including both development studios, were acquired by Zuxxez Entertainment AG.

The company was resurrected by Zuxxez in 2005. In 2011, Zuxxez officially changed its name back to TopWare Interactive, thus completely abandoning the Zuxxez brand. TopWare Interactive AG's American company, TopWare Interactive Inc., revealed that it was developing Battle vs. Chess to be published by SouthPeak Games. Interplay Entertainment sued and won an injunction to stop sales in the United States. In February 2012, Interplay won the case by default and a settlement was agreed on 15 November 2012. Terms of the settlement were $200,000 plus interest.

TopWare Interactive / Zuxxez Entertainment filed for bankruptcy again on 1 February 2016. While the company has not released any official comment on the subject yet, the insolvency has already been registered in the European Insolvency Register. The filing for bankruptcy comes just a few days after the pulling of Vendetta: Curse of Raven's Cry (the last game published by TopWare Interactive, a re-release of Raven's Cry) from Steam. Nevertheless, TopWare quietly released the game again later.

However, on 26 March 2016, TopWare announced it has begun development of Two Worlds 3 which was set to be released in 2020. However, no further information since that announcement has been made.

== Reality Pump Studios ==
Reality Pump Studios was founded as an in-house developer for TopWare Interactive in Bielsko-Biała, Poland, in 1995. Their first successful title was Earth 2140. In 2001, they formed a partnership with Zuxxez Entertainment AG and officially took the name 'Reality Pump - Game Development Studios'. They moved their headquarters to Kraków.

In 2015 the company went bankrupt and was acquired by TopWare Interactive.

== Published titles ==
=== Premium ===
- 1996: Das Schwarze Auge: Schatten über Riva — MS-DOS
- 1997: Jack Orlando — PC
- 1997: Earth 2140 — PC
- 1998: Emergency
- 1998: Knights and Merchants: The Shattered Kingdom
- 1999: Excessive Speed
- 1999: Gorky 17
- 1999: Jagged Alliance 2
- 1999: Septerra Core: Legacy of the Creator
- 2000: Earth 2150: Escape from the Blue Planet
- 2000: Earth 2150: The Moon Project
- 2001: Earth 2150: Lost Souls
- 2001: World War III: Black Gold
- 2002: Enclave
- 2001: Chicken Shoot 1
- 2002: Knights and Merchants: The Peasants Rebellion
- 2002: Heli Heroes
- 2002: World War II: Panzer Claws
- 2003: Chicken Shoot 2
- 2003: KnightShift
- 2004: Jagged Alliance 2: Wildfire
- 2004: I of the Dragon
- 2005: Earth 2160 — PC
- 2006: Dream Pinball 3D — PC
- 2007: Two Worlds — PC, Xbox 360
- 2009: X-Blades — PC, Xbox 360, PlayStation 3
- 2010: Two Worlds II — PC, Mac, Xbox 360, PlayStation 3
- 2011: Two Worlds 2: Pirates of the Flying Fortress — PC, Mac, Xbox 360, PlayStation 3
- 2011: Battle vs Chess aka Check vs. Mate — PC, Mac, Xbox 360, PlayStation 3, Nintendo Wii
- 2012: Planets under Attack — PC, Xbox 360, PlayStation 3
- 2012: Iron Sky: Invasion — PC, Mac, Xbox 360, PlayStation 3
- 2015: Raven's Cry — PC, Mac
- 2016: Two Worlds 2: Call of the Tenebrae
- 2017: Two Worlds 2: Shadows of the Dark Past
- 2018: Two Worlds 2: Shadows of the Dark Past 2
- 2019: Two Worlds 2: Shattered Embrace
- TBA: Scivelation — PC, Xbox One, PlayStation 4
- TBA: Two Worlds III

=== Value ===
- Dream Pinball 3D
- Burn
- BoG Arcade
- BoG Role Playing
- BoG Strategy
- WWIII: Black Gold
- World War II: Panzer Claws II
- Kings of Dark Age
- Septerra Core
- Gorky 17
- Heli Heroes
- Knights & Merchants
- Earth 2140
- Earth 2150
- Earth 2160
- Das Schwarze Auge: Die Schicksalsklinge (1997 re-release)
- Das Schwarze Auge: Sternenschweif (1997 re-release)
- Das Schwarze Auge: Schatten über Riva (1997 re-release)
- EEP Pro 3.0
- Jack Orlando
- X-Blades
- Transcripted
- Gold Games compilation series

=== Cancelled ===
- 2014: Sacrilegium — PC, Mac OS X, Xbox 360, PlayStation 3, Wii U
