= Clockwork Radio (band) =

UK alternative rock band

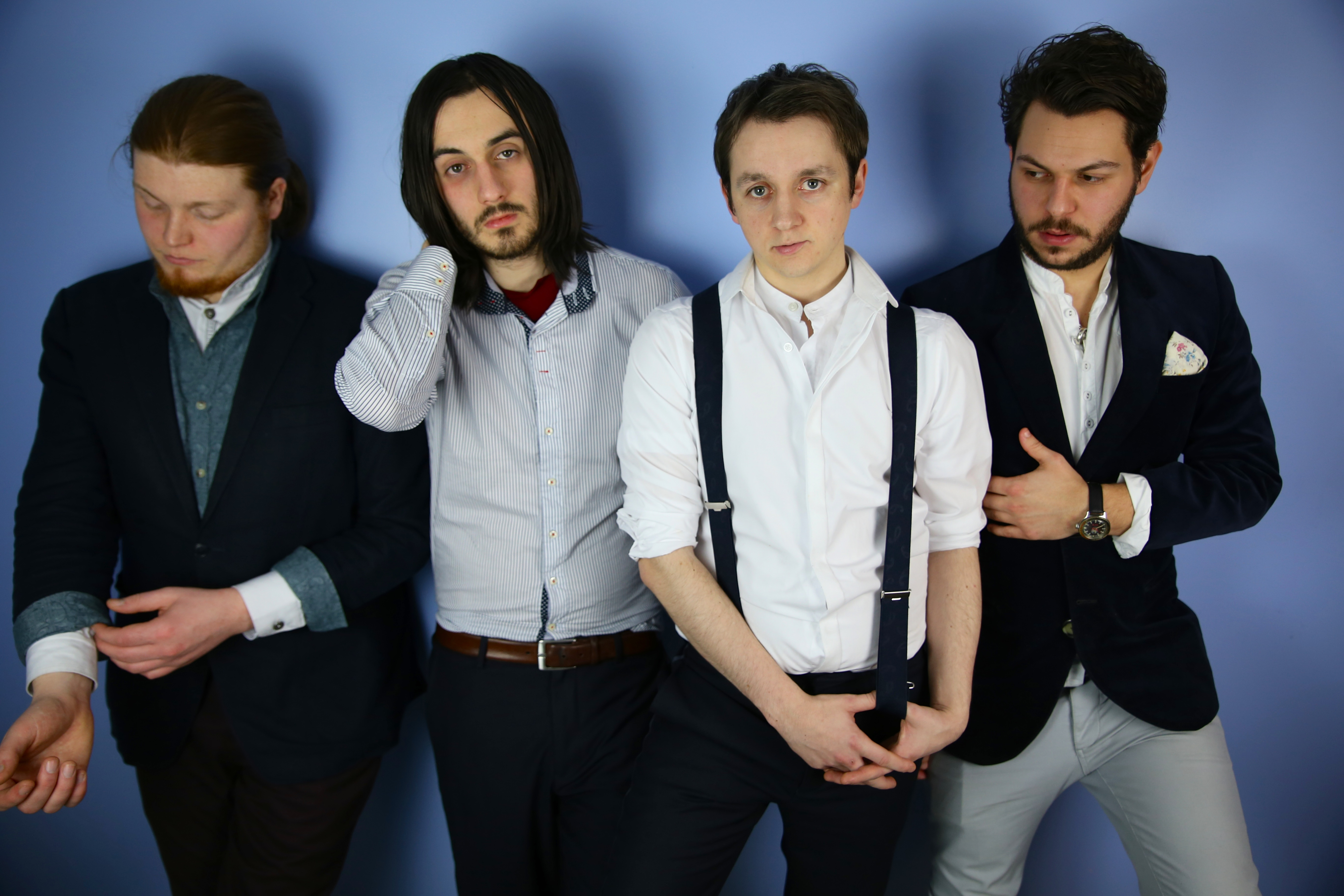
- Left to right: Sam Quinn, Iwan Jones, Rich Williams and Dan Wiebe

Background information
- Origin: Caernarfon, Wales
- Genres: Alternative rock
- Years active: 2010-present
- Members: Rich Williams; Dan Wiebe; Iwan Jones; Sam Quinn
- Website: clockworkradio.co.uk

Clockwork Radio are an alternative rock band from Wales, now based in Manchester. They have self-released four EPs and have toured extensively around Europe. The band released their debut album No Man Is An Island in September 2014.

== History ==
=== Beginnings ===
Clockwork Radio started in north Wales as a side-project of singer and guitarist Rich Williams. This early incarnation of the band released the single "Lost" in November 2007, which was quickly picked up and played by BBC Radio One, BBC Radio Wales and other national radio stations. Two years later Williams teamed up with lead-guitarist Iwan Jones and they relocated to Manchester, England, to concentrate on music and putting a live band together.

The current line-up came together in 2010 when Dan Wiebe, Sam Quinn and Nadim Mirshak joined the band (in 2012 Mirshak left the band, with Quinn taking up on bass). The band began writing new material and started to tour the UK and Europe where they were booked for Taubertal Festival in Germany in August 2010 as a "secret tip".

=== Tours and releases ===
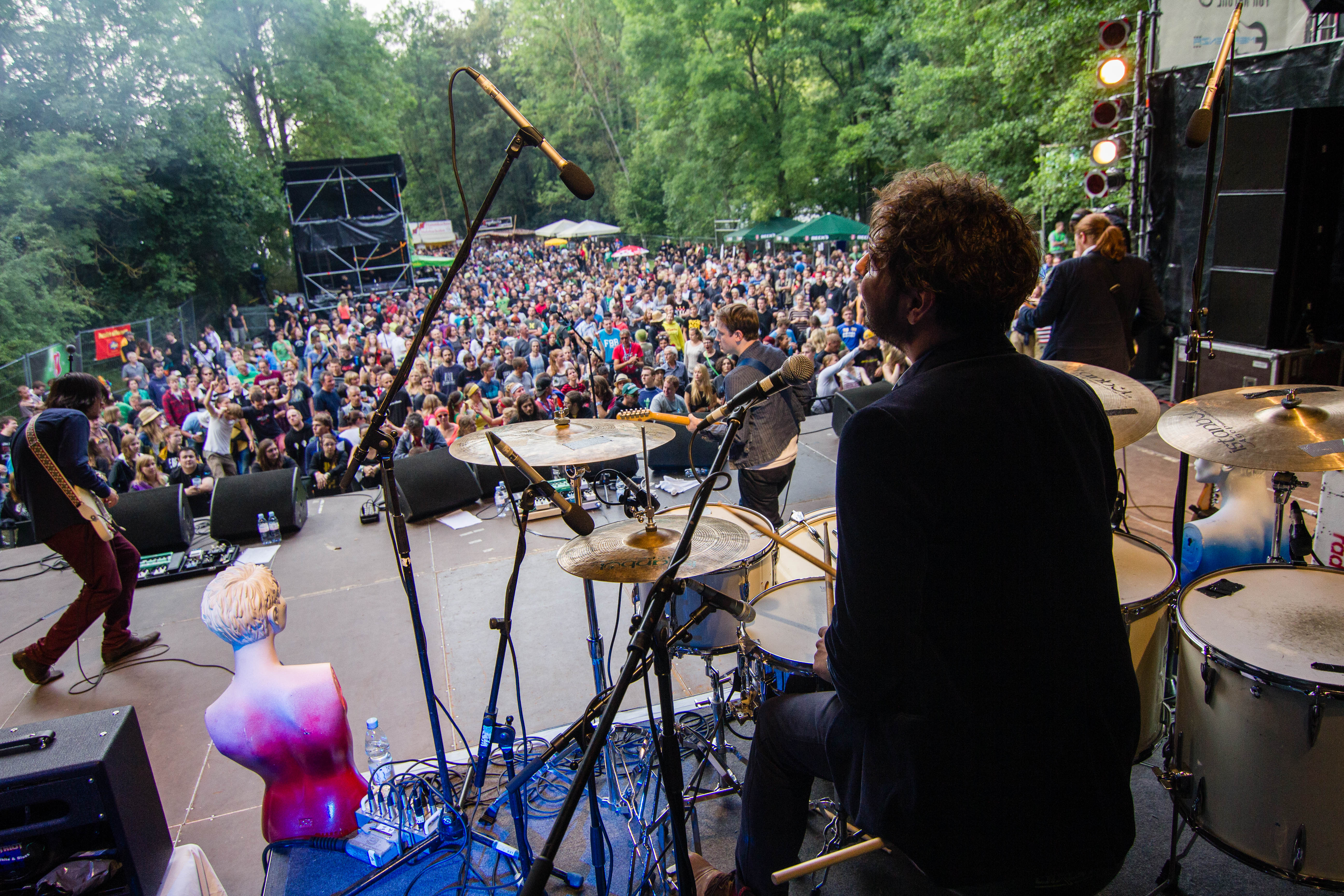
Clockwork Radio – Live at Taubertal Festival 2013

To date, the band have done multiple tours across the UK, France, Germany, Belgium, The Netherlands, Luxembourg and Denmark.

So far they have released four EPs exploring various genres including rock, funk and afro-beat, including an all acoustic EP Sketch. All the releases were done via their own label Poly Tune and made available for free download on the band's website. For the artwork and videos the band collaborated with underground artists including Agnes Cecile (Italy) and Juan Carlos Riviera (Spain).

Early reviews include features on the BBC Introducing site stating "Essentially an epic but considered style, their music is effortlessly "large" with Williams' vocals powerful & melodic" and also a feature on Music-Dash.co.uk giving the band 4.5 out of 5.

=== Debut album ===
Clockwork Radio announced details of their debut album due for release in early 2014. The album was recorded live over two days at 80 Hertz Studios in Manchester.

== Members ==
- Rich Williams – Vocals/Guitar
- Dan Wiebe – Vocals/Percussion
- Iwan Jones – Vocals/Guitar
- Sam Quinn – Bass/Keys

== Discography ==
| Name | Label | Date |
|---|---|---|
| No Man Is An Island | Poly Tune | 8 September 2014 |
| Ubuntu EP | Poly Tune | 14 May 2012 |
| Sketch EP | Poly Tune | 26 September 2011 |
| The Soul Harmonic EP | Poly Tune | 22 November 2010 |
| State of Mind EP | Poly Tune | 4 July 2010 |

== Videography ==
| Name | Album | Label | Date |
|---|---|---|---|
| "Please You" | The Soul Harmonic EP | Poly Tune | 8 March 2011 |

2011 saw them becoming the first independent band to create a 360-degree interactive music video that is available on their website.
