= The Soul Harmonic =

The Soul Harmonic EP

EP by Clockwork Radio
- Released: 22 November 2010
- Recorded: 2010
- Genre: Alternative rock
- Length: 25:17
- Label: Poly Tune

Singles from The Soul Harmonic EP
- 1. "Please You" Released: 22 November 2010

The Soul Harmonic EP is the second EP by the Welsh alternative rock band Clockwork Radio. Produced by the band, the album was released on 22 November 2010 on the band's own label, Poly Tune.

== Genre ==
The album has been referred to as Alternative rock, Prog rock, or "Electro", and some say a "Spanish Guitar feel."

== Track listing ==
The EP was 5 songs long, totaling to 25 minutes and 17 seconds.

All lyrics are written by Clockwork Radio; all music is composed by Clockwork Radio

The Soul Harmonic EP
| No. | Title | Length |
|---|---|---|
| 1. | "Desire" | 6:04 |
| 2. | "Please You" | 5:39 |
| 3. | "Solitaire" | 3:55 |
| 4. | "Soul Harmonic" | 5:06 |
| 5. | "Please You (Radio Edit)" | 4:32 |
| Total length: | | 25:17 |

== Members ==
Clockwork Radio

- Rich Williams – vocals, guitar
- Dan Wiebe – percussion
- Iwan Jones – vocals, guitar
- Nadim Mirshak – vocals, bass
- Sam Quinn – piano, synths
