= Dream Pinball 3D =

2006 video game

- European Wii cover art for Dream Pinball 3D
- Developer(s): A. S. K. Homework; RuneSoft (Mac)
- Publisher(s): GER: Zuxxez Entertainment (PC); WW: SouthPeak Games
- Platform(s): Windows, Wii, Nintendo DS, iOS, Mac OS X
- Release: Windows: GER: September 2006; NA: February 12, 2008; EU: February 2008; AU: April 2008; Wii: NA: April 22, 2008; EU: May 16, 2008; AU: May 22, 2008; Nintendo DS: NA: April 24, 2008; AU: April 2008; EU: June 27, 2008; iOS: WW: July 18, 2012; Mac OS X/OS X: GER: August 15, 2008; WW: December 3, 2012
- Genre(s): Pinball
- Mode(s): Single player, multiplayer

Dream Pinball 3D is a pinball simulation game developed by TopWare Interactive and published by SouthPeak Games for Microsoft Windows, first released online in 2006, and then ported to Wii and Nintendo DS in 2008. Dream Pinball 3D features six tables to play on, each with a distinct theme, including a medieval table, an aquatic table, a monsters (zombies and vampires mostly) table, and a dinosaurs table. Apart from the different visual styles, each of these tables pose a different challenge because of their varying flipper, ramp, and bumper positions.

== Gameplay ==
Windows screenshot of Dream Pinball 3D - displaying the 'Monsters' pinball table.

As in the majority of pinball simulation video games - the objective is to gain as many points as possible by hitting the correct bumpers and obstacles. Bonuses included - point multipliers and extra lives - they are gained by hitting particularly hard shots. The games also features six different pinball materials - such as gold and steel - which affects the ball's physics.

The Windows version features an online high score list - in which the player can compare their performance with others. The Wii version can either be played with the Wii Remote and Nunchuk, with controls similar to Pinball Hall of Fame: The Williams Collection released a few months prior, or just the Wii Remote itself turned on its side for classic control. The Nintendo DS version is played entirely with buttons, with the D-pad being used to nudge the table. The top screen is used to represent the table's backglass, limiting the main dynamic camera view of the table to the touch screen.

== Reception ==
Reception

Aggregate score
Aggregator	Score		
Aggregator	DS	PC	Wii
Metacritic	56/100	61/100	54/100

Review scores
Publication	Score		
Publication	DS	PC	Wii
GamesMaster	49%	N/A	N/A
GameZone	N/A	N/A	3/10
IGN	6.5/10	5.1/10	5.1/10
NGamer	N/A	N/A	50%
PC Format	N/A	79%	N/A
PC Gamer (UK)	N/A	77%	N/A
PC Gamer (US)	N/A	38%	N/A
PC Zone	N/A	70%	N/A

The DS, PC and Wii versions received "mixed" reviews according to the review aggregation website Metacritic.

== Sequel ==
Five years after the game's initial retail release, TopWare Interactive released a sequel to the game, Dream Pinball 3D II, in Europe, targeting next-generation Nintendo platforms, as well as the PlayStation 3 and Xbox 360. However, it was only known to be available on Wii U and Xbox 360.
