= Lost (Stargate Universe) =

- Stargate Universe episode
- Eli, Chloe and Scott arrive on a new planet attempting to find the Destiny
- Episode no.: Season 1 Episode 15
- Directed by: Ronn Schmidt
- Written by: Martin Gero
- Production code: 115
- Original air date: April 30, 2010

Guest appearances
- Julia Benson as Vanessa James; Haig Sutherland as Sgt. Hunter Riley; Peter Kelamis as Adam Brody; Jennifer Spence as Lisa Park; Stefanie Samuels as Angela; Sean Blakemore as Reginald Greer; Shang Forbes as Cameron Shang Forbes; William MacDonald as Virgil Biggs

Episode chronology
← Previous "Human"	Next → "Sabotage"

"Lost" is the fifteenth episode of military science fiction television series Stargate Universe. The episode originally aired on April 30, 2010 on Syfy in the United States, and on SPACE in Canada. The episode was directed by, Rohn Schmidt who previously acted as the director of photography in Air. It was written by Martin Gero, a co-executive producer of Stargate Atlantis.

In this episode, the off-world team continues its search for a way out of the tunnels. However a collapse traps Sgt. Greer under the rubble. Fearing his death the team leaves him behind trying to catch up to the Destiny, which is close to leaving the galaxy. In his solitude Greer relives memories of his abusive father.

== Plot ==
Dr. Nicholas Rush (Robert Carlyle) continues to work with Adam Brody (Peter Kelamis) to try to rescue the stranded off-world team. Meanwhile, Sgt. Riley (Haig Sutherland) has taken over kino duties, documenting activities around the ship. However their efforts are hampered by Destiny's sudden loss of power, including the kinos.

As the off-world team explores the tunnels searching for a way out, Eli (David Blue) comes up with a plan to get them back to Destiny. He plans to move from planet to planet hoping there are gates in range to keep them moving, eventually reaching Destiny. Power is partially restored to Destiny, but it reveals bad news. Dr. Rush informs Colonel Young (Louis Ferreira) that the ship is about to leave the galaxy, and that the next time Destiny comes out of FTL will be the last chance to find the off-world team.

Meanwhile, the kino has found an exit out of the tunnels. Chloe (Elyse Levesque) believes she has found a map to aid them. Greer checks the hypothesis, but a tremor causes rubble to fall on Greer, trapping him. Eli, Chloe and Scott race to free Greer, but as the tremors get worse, and no reply from Greer is given, the team is forced to abandon the rescue and leave Greer behind. Meanwhile, Destiny has dropped out of FTL and Young dispatches a team to try to find the off-world team by moving planet to planet using the Stargates.

As Greer regains consciousness and tries to dig his way out of the rubble, he relives memories of his abusive father (Sean Blakemore), such as being locked in a closet, being told to move and stack bricks and subsequently being left to fend for himself as a child. Greer is able to dig his way out and races towards the Stargate, but it is too late. Eli, Chloe and Scott have left and begin trying to find their way back to Destiny.

Greer, with no other choice, settles in, waiting for a rescue. He relives a memory of his home on fire. He is able to rescue his mother (Stefanie Samuels), but his father is caught in an explosion. Meanwhile, with time running out, James and Rush split up to cover more planets in an effort to find the off-world team. On the Destiny T.J. (Alaina Huffman) reveals to Colonel Young that she is pregnant and that he is the father. Colonel Young assures T.J. that they will make it work.

Eli, Chloe and Scott continue to jump from planet to planet. However they lose their only kino to a planet with a toxic atmosphere. Eli recognizes one of the addressees, as the planet where Rush was stranded. Chloe suggests re-tracing their steps, but Eli disagrees. With no kino, each trip through the gate could be their last. Eli suggests going to the planet, and looking through the downed ship's computers to try to have a better chance of getting to the Destiny. Scott reluctantly agrees to do so. Meanwhile, James has managed to find Greer.

As Eli searches through the ship's computer, he is unable to make sense of it. However Chloe recognizes some of the symbols and uses her knowledge to access a map of the galaxy. Eli now knows how to get back to the Destiny but realizes it is about to leave the galaxy and they race to make it back. Eli, Chloe and Scott make it to the final planet and attempt a dial to Destiny. However at the same time Rush and his team arrive back on Destiny blocking Eli's attempt. With time expired, Destiny jumps to FTL, and the team is left stranded.

== Reception ==
Lost was viewed by 1.587 million live viewers, resulting in a 1.0 Household rating, a 0.6 among adults 18-49. These figures were not seen since the episode Divided.

Carl England of Den of Geek positively received the episode, saying that it "takes us from one place to another without feeling contrived." England was also pleased with the chance to explore Greer's past; being able to find out "why he is the way he is, showing his relationship with his parents and the obvious effect it had on him." Overall, England thought the ending was "pretty dour" and it left him with questions that would be answered in the following episode. Ramsey Isler of IGN rated "Lost" an "Impressive" 8.2 out of 10. It was praised for Jamil Walker Smith's portrayal of Sgt. Greer, saying that "this is the first time Greer comes off as vulnerable, and even a little scared, and it fully fleshes out a character who was already a fan favorite." However among Isler's complaints was the "crazy guy in the hospital flashback", the cheesiness of the T-Rex scene and the overall pacing of the episode was slow. Meredith Woerner from Io9 was "generally pleased" with the episode. Woerner was a split with Greer's past, saying it was "stereotypical mean Daddy issues" and the idea of post traumatic syndrome as the excuse for the change in behavior is cliche.
