= Two Worlds (video game) =

2007 video game

- PC cover art
- Developer: Reality Pump
- Publishers: GER: Zuxxez Entertainment; NA/UK/AU: SouthPeak Games
- Designer: Mirosław Dymek
- Composer: Harold Faltermeyer
- Platforms: Microsoft Windows, Xbox 360, Linux, OS X
- Release: Windows, Xbox 360: GER: 9 May 2007; NA: 24 August 2007; UK/AU: 7 September 2007; Linux, OS X: WW: 25 May 2016
- Genre: Action role-playing
- Modes: Single-player, multiplayer

Two Worlds is a 2007 high fantasy action role-playing game developed by Reality Pump and published by TopWare Interactive in Europe and by SouthPeak Games in North America for the Xbox 360 and Microsoft Windows. A sequel, Two Worlds II, was released in Europe in 2010 and in North America in 2011.

== Gameplay ==
The game takes place in a real-time three-dimensional fantasy landscape. As such it has drawn comparison with The Elder Scrolls IV: Oblivion. Much like in Oblivion and Gothic 3, the gameplay is non-linear. The player is free to explore the game world, accepting side quests at will. There is however, a core quest, centering on rescuing the protagonist's sister, who is being held for ransom by mysterious forces who are scheming to open the tomb of Aziraal, the god of fire.

The game does not utilize fixed character classes like other role-playing games. As the character gains experience and levels, it is possible to invest gained Attribute Points into any attribute, leading to a variety of game play styles and approaches. Death in the game leads to resurrection at a nearby shrine; these shrines are distributed across the game world, and also replenish health when the player comes in sufficient proximity. However, the highest difficulty of the game features a permanent death feature.

The world in which the game takes place is called Antaloor. While traveling through the game the player will encounter new teleports, caves, villages, and other locations, and these travels are recorded by the in-game mini-map. Teleports allow rapid travel between explored regions. Horses are available for the player to ride as well as other animals/creatures. There are various creatures in Two Worlds. Unlike other CRPGs with wilderness areas, enemies will not respawn. Most of the non-wilderness areas are densely populated.

Beyond the main quest there is no set storyline to follow, the player is free to choose to complete the quests of their liking, and explore at will. The player may choose to act as a righteous hero and be honored amongst the population, or to be devilish and feared, through reputation gained by completing certain quests. However, the path chosen will have consequences on the outcome of the game.

Two Worlds has an alchemy system that allows the player to combine ingredients to make potions, weapon enhancements, traps, and bombs. Spending Skill Points on the Alchemy Skill or using more ingredients will result in more powerful potions. Ingredients can be found as plants in the wild, the body parts of animals and monsters that have been slain, and minerals and gems taken as loot or collected off the ground. Some potions can have permanent effects such as a boost to strength, health, dexterity, magic etc.

Should a player decide that they are unhappy with their ability and skill point distribution, there are NPCs called "skill changers" in some of the larger cities that offer a "regression", which allows redistribution of some skill points for a certain price. Some of the Skill changers can refund more points for a greater cost, depending on the character's level and amount of experience.

=== Factions ===
There are seven factions within the game for which the player can complete quests to gain reputation. These are the Brotherhood, the Society, the Merchants Guild, the Giriza, the Necromancers, the House Skelden, and the Karga Clan.

- The Brotherhood is a mercenary society. In the main cities of the game their location can be identified by their signature red banners. Brotherhood locations in cities will usually have a trainer that offers to teach the various combat skills for a small fee, and Brotherhood shops will have the largest selections of weapons and armor. The higher the rep in the Brotherhood the cheaper it is to buy supplies.
- The Society is Two Worlds' answer to the Guild of Mages seen in most RPGs. In the main cities their location can be identified by blue banners. The Society locations will usually have a trainer that offers to teach the various schools of magic for a small fee. Society shops will have robes, staves, and spells for sale.
- The Merchants Guild is a guild of traders and merchants. In the main cities their location can be identified by banners emblazoned with scales. The shops of the Merchant Guild offer a general assortment of goods, the higher the reputation in the merchants guild the cheaper it is to buy supplies.
- The Giriza is the equivalent of the Thieves' Guild. The members wear distinctive red hoods and the Giriza shops are a good source for lock picks and other thievery-related goods. Giriza trainers offer knowledge in the stealthy arts. The higher the reputation the more one can sell goods for.
- The Necromancers are the only source that will teach the ability to use the Necromancy School of Magic, but are generally shunned by polite society. The Society makes a point of stopping Necromancers from completing their goals.
- The House Skelden and the Karga Clan are two competing factions in the northern reaches of the human half of the world. The Karga Clan are the former ruling house that was supplanted by the King and Council with the House Skelden.

The player can choose to work with any faction to achieve specific goals in the main quest. As is typical for the genre, players generally earn reputation with a faction by completing appropriate quests.

=== Multiplayer ===
A multiplayer element is included, though it is not of the massively multiplayer online game type. Activities include horse racing, combat and quests. Single-player and multi-player characters are kept separate and not shared between modes. While the Xbox 360 version is limited to eight players, the PC version allows a significantly greater number. However, they must be grouped into parties of no more than eight. Using the multiplayer element in Two Worlds allows the user to change race; neither this nor the race of Elves are present in single player mode.

== Development and release ==
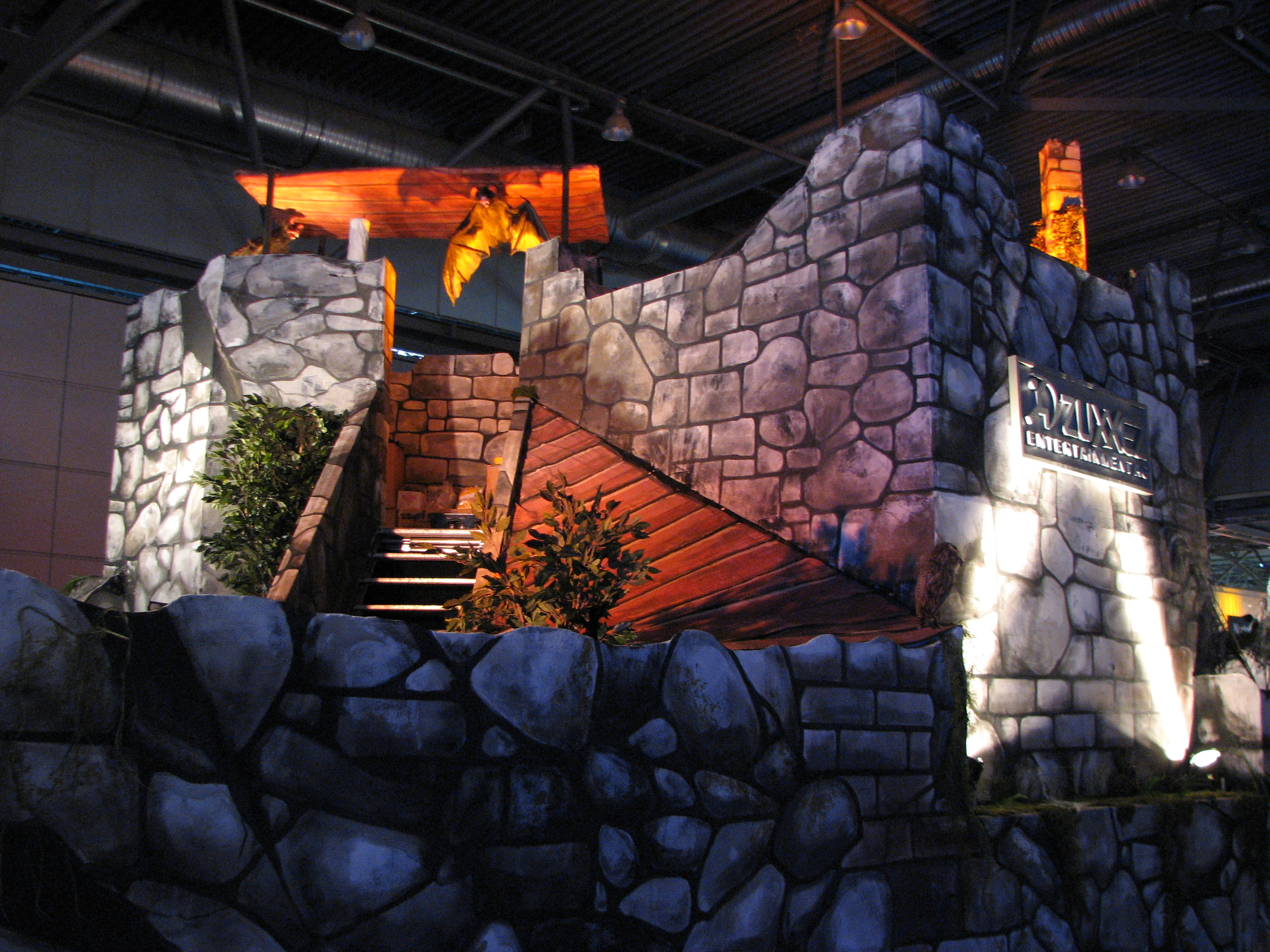
Two Worlds booth at GC 2008

The game was initially announced by the Polish developer Reality Pump as Polanie 3 or Knight Shift 2: Curse of Souls, a sequel to a real time strategy game Polanie II (Knight Shift), that eventually lost all of its RTS elements and morphed into a computer role-playing game.

Two other versions of the game have been released. The Collector's Edition was released on 23 August 2007 in the United States. It features the game, two bonus cards with codes to unlock exclusive weapons, a bonus disc, map and a handbook. The Royal Edition was released in Europe for the PC and Xbox 360 on 7 September 2007. It comes with a T-shirt, marked with the Two Worlds logo, a deck of playing cards, a poster with the world map, letter opener (only available in the PC version) and a bonus disc.

Two downloadable content packs were released. Tainted Blood was released on 13 March 2008 and Curse of Souls was released on 3 April 2008. The original game and the two expansions were packed together and sold as Two Worlds: Epic Edition. It was released on 19 August 2008 in North America and on 12 September 2008 in Europe.

Since release, there have been numerous patches to improve the gameplay, graphics, and controls. In August 2008, a new version of the game including two multiplayer add-ons was released.

== Related media ==
A deck of 55 cards (52 playing cards and 3 Jokers) in a plastic box was released on 19 December 2006. The cards contained images of characters and scenes from the game.

A letter opener in the shape of the sword Kilgorin designed by artist Kit Rae was released on 22 November 2006. The handle was made out of cast metal and the blade of polished steel (false-edged). The overall length was 10-7/8" with the blade length at 7-1/2" and a thickness of 1/8".

=== Soundtrack ===
Two Worlds – The Album

Soundtrack album
- Released: October 14, 2007 (Germany)
- Genre: Video game soundtrack
- Length: (One CD)

The official Two Worlds soundtrack was released on a single disc on 14 October 2007 by TopWare. It was composed and arranged by Harold Faltermeyer and featured AmberMoon. The music was played by the musicians of the MGM Grand Orchestra and contained a mix of Gothic, classical, and rock. The title song “Play the Game” was sung by Kyra and included various remix versions.

A second soundtrack titled TWO WORLDS – The Maxi-Single was released on a single disc on 30 August 2007 by TopWare. It was composed and arranged by Harold Faltermeyer and featured AmberMoon. It included the title song "Play the Game" sung by Kyra and three other songs in new arrangements.

Two Worlds – The Album track listing
Disc 1
1. Two Worlds (Main theme)
2. Play the Game
3. Siege of Cathalon
4. Ashos
5. Cathalon
6. Bot Moss Forest
7. Desert Attack
8. Grom Town
9. Magta Lahjar
10. GorGammar
11. Opala
12. Love Conquers
13. Magta Lahjar (Remix)
14. Tharbakin
15. Maasarah
16. Purgatory
17. Hades

Two Worlds – The Maxi-Single track listing
Disc 1
1. Play the Game (radio edit)
2. Magta Lahjar (remix)
3. Play the Game (extended)
4. Siege of Cathalon

== Reception ==
Reception

Aggregate scores
Aggregator	Score
GameRankings	PC: 65% X360: 50%
Metacritic	PC: 65/100; X360: 50/100

Review scores
Publication	Score
1Up.com	C+
Edge	4/10
Eurogamer	4/10
Game Informer	4/10
GameRevolution	D+
GameSpot	PC: 7.5/10; X360: 7/10
GameSpy	1/5
IGN	PC: 7.3/10; X360: 6.8/10
Official Xbox Magazine (UK)	5/10
Official Xbox Magazine (US)	6/10
PC Gamer (UK)	81%
TeamXbox	5.1
X-Play	2/5

Upon initial release, Two Worlds received mixed reviews; the PC version gained an average critic score of 65% while the Xbox 360 version received more negative feedback with an average critic score of 50%. GameSpot gave Two Worlds a 7.5 for the PC version, and a 7 for the Xbox 360 version. IGN gave the PC version 7.3, and the Xbox 360 version 6.8, while GameSpy gave the game 1 out of 5 stars.

The game was criticized for its poor graphics, interface and voice acting, which was written and recorded by Reality Pump themselves rather than by professional writers and an audio outsourcer studio (though the game still featured professional voice actors). Hyper's Daniel Wilks commends the game for its "huge map, great character creation and lots to explore". However, he criticises the game for being "not finished, buggy as hell and [having] the worst ending ever".

In Germany however, where Two Worlds was first released, reception was much more positive, receiving scores between 80% and 93% by over 50 different websites and reviewers.
