= Alice Lichtenstein =

American novelist (born 1958)

- Born: January 7, 1958 (age 68)
- Education: Boston University (MFA) ([Brown University, Providence, RI]) ([Princeton High School, Princeton, NJ 1975])
- Occupation: Novelist

Alice Lichtenstein (born January 7, 1958) is an American novelist. She earned her MFA from Boston University. Her three novels are The Genius of the World, Lost, and The Crime Of Being.
