= Two Worlds II =

2010 video game

- Developer: Reality Pump
- Publisher: TopWare Interactive
- Directors: Mirosław Dymek; Scott Cromie
- Producer: Adam Salawa
- Designer: Mirosław Dymek
- Programmer: Jacek Sikora
- Composers: Borislav Slavov; Victor Stoyanov
- Engine: GRACE
- Platforms: Mac OS X Microsoft Windows; PlayStation 3 Xbox 360
- Release: Microsoft Windows, Mac OS X: EU: 12 November 2010; NA: 8 February 2011; AU: 24 February 2011; Xbox 360: EU: 12 November 2010; NA: 25 January 2011; AU: November 2010; PlayStation 3: EU: 19 November 2010; NA: 25 January 2011
- Genre: Action role-playing
- Modes: Single-player, multiplayer

Two Worlds II is an action role-playing game developed by Polish developer Reality Pump and published by TopWare Interactive as a sequel to 2007's Two Worlds. It was released on 9 November 2010 in Europe for Microsoft Windows, Mac OS X, Xbox 360 and PlayStation 3, and on 25 January 2011 in North America for the same platforms. Two Worlds II is a real-time role-playing game that takes place in an open fantasy world where players take the role of a single character with whom they can explore and undertake quests.

== Gameplay ==
From the beginning players can customize the appearance of the protagonist such as shape of face and body, and skin colour. As is common in role-playing games, the player's character will level up by gaining experience points through completion of quests and defeating enemies. Much of the in-game world can be fully explored from the beginning, regardless of how much the player has progressed through the main story arc. Despite being non-linear, many areas of the land are populated by strong foes with higher levels than that of the player initially and as a result, players may want to explore them once their character has improved. While players will travel across much of the landscape on foot, they are soon given the option to ride on horseback and even later, a chance to man the helm of a boat to sail across the seas between islands. In addition players can also fast travel using magical teleportation fixtures found across the map.

From the beginning of the single-player game, all players' characters begin at the base level. Rather than having players choose a character's class and style of play, as they level up points are given to be spent on improving their four main stats; endurance (health and damage), strength (combat), accuracy (ranged), and willpower (magic) while also unlocking and improving various other skills and abilities such as forging items, special combat moves, sneaking, spells and others. Players can also mix skills instead of focusing on one type of character build.

Materials can be gathered throughout the game world, either found in the wild, purchased from vendors, looted from fallen enemies or recovered from unneeded equipment. Whilst some materials can be used in the forging/upgrading of weaponry and armor, others can be used in the creation of lethal devices such as traps or bombs. Many others however are ingredients for potions that can be brewed by the player. These mixtures can either be used to recover a player's health or magical reserve, to temporarily buff their skills or attributes, or to use against foes as poisons. Owing to the large number of outcomes, players can name and document their new creations.

=== Multiplayer ===
The online multiplayer component is entirely separate from the single player game, meaning that upon first entering online play, players will create an entirely new base level character purely for use in multiplayer modes. Unlike at the start of the single player campaign, players are given the opportunity to choose the race and gender of their character, in addition to the smaller changes allowed in the single player character creator. The main multiplayer component is the Adventure mode; seven unique maps for up to eight players to accomplish given objectives cooperatively. Like in single player, characters can gain experience and skill points to improve their attributes and skills. After the player has accumulated 10,000 auras (the in-game currency), they can participate in Village mode, which allocates them a portion of land in a separate map, in which they can build and upgrade various structures to create a functioning village that can further generate more currency for use in both the Village and Adventure modes.

The other multiplayer modes are based on various player versus player objectives, in which a player's character can be brought into a wide range of maps and game types to compete against other human players online. These include; one on one duels in a small arena, team death matches where two teams of players must reach a certain kill count to win, and "crystal capture" where two team of players must collect a certain number of blue crystal that appear across the chosen map, along with other pickups that can remove or add crystals.

== Plot ==
Gandohar has managed to name himself Emperor of Antaloor. The power of the hero is finally exhausted, and he and his sister Kyra are taken prisoner. Everything changes when he is saved by a group of orcs on orders of their prophet, and the prophet seems to know why the hero can get to Gandohar.

The game begins in Castle Vakhmaar, with the hero and Kyra in Gandohar's captivity. Gandohar utilises the Hero's lifeforce to sustain Kyra, who is revealed to be the host of Aziraal, God of Fire and Destruction. The hero is rescued by a group of orcs, the mysterious masked rogue Dar Pha, the archer Nortar, the mague Ghortarius and warrior Rogdor, who is confronted by Sordahon, Gandohar's right hand man, responsible for the destruction of the orc army at Oswaroth prior to the game's events. Rogdor kills Sordahon, and the group escape via a portal to Alsorna, a small island off the coast of Elkronas, the main continent of Antaloor.

There, the protagonist meets with the eponymous prophet, who is revealed to be a woman named Cassara, who informs the hero of Gandohar's plan to use Kyra as a power source for his magic, in turn to consolidate his power over Antaloor further. The hero is sent to the desert continent of Erimos, to find the Mage's Guild and learn more about Gandohar's past. After journeying to the Tower of Fangs, it is learned that Gandohar was once a denizen of the tower, and the Hero is sent to the jungle continent of Eolas, but not before being intercepted by the ghost of Sordahon, who the Hero manages to defeat.

Once on Eolas, the Hero learns of the Swallows, a large portion of the island which has been swallowed up by a magical disaster which destroyed the old capital of the island, Ashos and scattered the region with horrific, twisted monsters. After gaining the ability to see the visions embedded within the ruined city, the Hero learns that Gandohar himself caused the Swallows' formation through a magical experiment gone wrong, and his true intentions.

Eventually, the Hero is sent to Elkronas, to the swamp of Tir Geal, where the Hero finds a town beset by demons and undead. Defeating them, the Hero finds a teleporter which will take him to the foot of Castle Vakhmaar, on the southern tip of Elkronas. Doing so, the Hero makes his way past hordes of demons before being greeted by Gandohar's guards, who surrender before escorting him to Gandohar himself. Gandohar, greatly weakened and uncharacteristically non-tyrannical explains the truth to the Hero, reuniting him with Kyra. Gandohar intended on using the Hero's lifeforce to help contain Aziraal so as to preserve Antaloor from the scourge which would ensue if he were to break free. With the Hero's escape, Gandohar was forced to use his own lifeforce, thus weakening him so. At this point, the group is greeted with an intruder who proves to be none other than Cassara herself, who reveals her true identity as a servant of Aziraal, before transforming into a dragon and killing Gandohaar. The Hero then must slay Cassara with a series of ballistas on the castle's battlements. Once Cassara is slain, Kyra is exorcised of Aziraal on the castle's battlements, before Gandohar's crown, which fell out of Cassara's mouth is presented to the Hero, with the implication that he would become Emperor due to the power vacuum now present.

In the next scene, however, we are greeted to Kyra taking her place as Antaloor's new ruler, wearing Gandohar's characteristic regalia, implying her pretense to Gandohar's identity. Following this, the game cuts to the Hero and Dar Pha walking through Alsorna, with the Hero explaining his disdain for politics, before Dar Pha disappears, leaving the Hero alone.

== Release ==
The release date for the game in the UK was set for 4 February but due to unforeseen circumstances the shipment of games was damaged. The publisher TopWare's Managing Director James Seaman said "We just received the container from China with the Collector's Edition and other components and they are wrecked...Several components were just a total wreck and unacceptable for us to give out to our fans." The new release date was scheduled for 25 February. Both Game and Zavvi.com cancelled their existing pre-orders of the game with customers, stating that they would not be stocking the game and offered their apologies. After speaking with Game, Eurogamer got in contact with Seaman, who denied rumours of Two Worlds II's release date being pushed back to 15 March, but stated "But we will be doing something different - stay tuned." TopWare later decided to forego a retail release, instead making Two Worlds II available at the time only via the online retailer Amazon.co.uk, quoted as saying that "Amazon will be fulfilling all of the United Kingdom", to make sure "that the UK is taken care of."

=== Pirates of the Flying Fortress ===
Originally Seaman announced what he referred to as the "next Two Worlds game coming out in 2012", mistakenly reported as a sequel to Two Worlds II. However it was later revealed as a new expansion pack for the game called Pirates of the Flying Fortress, released in September 2011. It features new animations, new recorded dialog, customization options, and new map area with a 10-hour campaign. It also includes four new multiplayer maps.

=== Game of the Year Edition ===
On 15 July 2011, it was announced that the game would be receiving a "Velvet GOTY Edition" set for release 18 October later that year. This announcement has raised some questions among gaming publications, which pointed out that Two Worlds II has not been named "Game of the Year" by any major media outlets. The PC version was released on 18 October, the Xbox 360 version was released on 2 November and the PlayStation 3 version followed on 9 December.

=== Engine upgrade ===
In March 2016, over five years after the game's original release, an upgrade to the game's engine was announced for Xbox 360, PlayStation 3, PC, Mac and Linux as well as two new story based downloadable content (DLC). The new engine offers "a much higher level of character and landscape detail, an HD-GUI, in addition to tons of in-game achievements, co-op multiplayer, and lots of new in-game features and upgrades". The tech update presages the release of eight new multiplayer maps and two single-player DLC packs.

=== Call of the Tenebrae ===
The first of the two newly announced DLC titled Call of the Tenebrae was released on 15 June 2017 and it "focuses on the Hero's return to Antaloor, where he witnesses the shocking murder of DarPha. The killers are a never-before-seen tribe of hideous, rat-like creatures known only as 'The Chosen.' who control a mysterious, powerful new magic. Their genocidal plot threatens every living creature in Antaloor, and it's up to the Hero to find a way to stop them." Thanks to the new engine, players can "expect to experience Antaloor like never before with the new engine update for Two Worlds II."

=== Shattered Embrace ===
The second of the two newly announced DLC is titled Shattered Embrace and was released on 6 December 2019.

== Reception ==
Reception

Aggregate score
Aggregator	Score
Metacritic	PC: 75/100; X360: 67/100; PS3: 70/100

Review scores
Publication	Score
Destructoid	8/10
Edge	5/10
Eurogamer	7/10
Game Informer	7.75/10
GamePro	3.5/5
GameSpot	7.5/10 (PC); 7/10 (PS3/360)
GameTrailers	7/10
IGN	6/10
PC Gamer (UK)	82/100

By February 2011, units sold exceeded 2 million.

Upon its release, Two Worlds II received a generally favorable reception, particularly in comparison to its predecessor. One of the most praised aspects of the gameplay was directed towards the crafting system, many critics noting its simplicity yet variety and depth with Al Bickham of Eurogamer commenting that "absolutely everything is worth looting, as the game's superb crafting systems enable you to repurpose every piece of trash in your backpack to useful ends". The spell casting aspect of this was particularly highlighted with GameTrailers calling it "more involved" than the other skills, stating that "there's a great deal to the magic system in Two Worlds II, so if you choose to specialize in spellcraft, expect to be rewarded". This view was echoed by Kevin VanOrd from GameSpot who called it "fun [and] flexible". On the topic of the ability to constantly be able to customize character skills and abilities, RPGamer felt that "even if players are not happy with the build they have created, stats can be reset for a fee. This helps to not pigeonhole a character into one unchangeable role."

While the story was considered by some critics like Phil Kollar at Game Informer as being nothing new and throwaway, the same reviewer however enjoyed the apparent comedic style at times that "from subtle references to the first game's poor quality to over-the-top scenarios such as encountering a woman who wants to feed you to her undead husband, the game's self-aware, tongue-in-cheek attitude is infectious". James Stephanie Sterling of Destructoid called "the game's sense of humor is one of its most endearing traits", going on to say "Two Worlds II has a very strong sense of individuality about itself, and that's more than can be said for many games with twice the production values."

On the technical side, many critics noted glitches and despite a significantly more favorable reception than the previous game in the series, the console versions were noted as being worse off, with VanOrd of GameSpot noting additional problems for the console versions including "tearing and frame rate stutters" being "distracting", as opposed to the PC version. Arthur Gies from IGN criticized the "difficult to navigate" menus and "oddly organized" quest logs as issues that feel "peppered throughout the rest of the game".

Despite giving the game a positive review, Sterling published an article in regards to allegations that publisher Topware Interactive had put pressure on certain media outlets, many European, particularly against scores below 7/10, including threats of being blacklisted for future releases and possible legal action against reviews claimed to be of "unfinished" versions of the game, along with manipulating user scores on multiple sites. That article also mentioned that Destructoid itself had sold advertising space to Topware but only received half the payment, allegedly based on their review. Topware Interactive denied all allegations but stated that they had been arguing with some reviewers about scores lower than 7/10, which they later admitted was a mistake.

== Sequel ==
In March 2016, a sequel was announced, titled Two Worlds III. It was set for release in 2019. In December 2018, TopWare Interactive told wccftech that Two Worlds III was still in pre-production as they were working on additional DLC content for Two Worlds II and that Two Worlds III would not be released until at least 2023. In an October 2021 interview, Dirk P. Hassinger of Topware Interactive stated that they weren't currently working on a Two Worlds project, and were in talks with potential partners for Two Worlds III.
