= Lost Cause (disambiguation) =

The Lost Cause of the Confederacy is a revisionist and revanchist narrative of the American Civil War, presenting the South as a heroic, noble victim.

Lost Cause may also refer to:

- Lost Cause (Jandek album), 1992
- Lost Cause (Tory Lanez mixtape), 2014
- "Lost Cause" (Beck song), 2002
- "Lost Cause" (Billie Eilish song), 2021
- "Lost Cause", a 1983 song by Riot Squad
- "Lost Cause", a 1989 song by Cosmic Psychos
- "Lost Cause", a song by Priscilla Ahn from the album When You Grow Up (2011)
- "Lost Cause", a song by Pink from the album Trustfall (2023)
- "Lost Cause", a song by Dean Brody from the album Right Round Here (2023)
- The Lost Cause (novel), 2023 novel by Cory Doctorow
- Lost Cause Motors, an American automobile manufacturer from 1963 to 1964
