= Earth 2150 =

2000 video game

- Developer: Reality Pump Studios
- Publishers: NA: TopWare Interactive; EU: Mattel Interactive
- Designer: Mirosław Dymek
- Platforms: Microsoft Windows, OS X
- Release: Windows: NA: June 12, 2000; UK: July 7, 2000; OS X August 21, 2015
- Genre: Strategy
- Modes: Single-player, multiplayer

Earth 2150, also known as Earth 2150: Escape from the Blue Planet, is a real-time strategy game, originally published in 2000 by SSI and Polish developer Reality Pump and a sequel to Earth 2140. 2150 was one of the first commercial full-3D games of its kind. A sequel, Earth 2160, was published in August 2005. The game also has two stand-alone expansion packs: Earth 2150: The Moon Project, and Earth 2150: Lost Souls.

== Gameplay ==
=== Campaign ===
Earth 2150 consists of a mostly linear series of missions with occasional choices over their order or branching after a win or loss, with mission goals such as such as gathering resources, destroying all enemy forces, or defending a fortified position. A conventional campaign structure for the genre, except the campaign isn't won by completing the missions, but at any point the player has expended 1,000,000 credits (half that for the Lunar Coalition) on building the means to evacuate from their doomed world. Complicating this, credits, representing materials, are also required to construct units, buildings and weapons, and for research.

The hunger for resources is present from the first mission on. Missions have finite ore deposits to mine for credits, and the player must decide whether to retain the funds for use in the mission, or commit them to a transport building that gradually ferries them to the spaceport for evacuation. Regardless of mission objectives all credits, in the ground and on hand, will be gradually delivered to the spaceport if the player destroys all enemy forces and ends the mission with the means in place.

The spaceport lies in the main base, a parallel map that persists through the campaign, can be switched to and from at will, can be used to build structures and units and conduct research, and has a vast air transport that can bring sizable amounts of units and credits to and from the mission. The main base has its own credit tally and the player can shuffle credits to and from the spaceport, but any time the spaceport contains 10,000 it launches them into space, where they're considered spent on the evacuation and cannot be retrieved. Units brought to the main base are retained between missions, although they'll count toward a population limit where the construction of new military units is disabled past a specific total credit cost, increasing from mission to mission, of all those owned. The player may opt to save money by building units at the main base instead of erecting factories at the mission site only to abandon them at the mission's end, but this is risky: the delays in transporting them may see the enemy gather more resources, or even throw the player out entirely.

The game has a global time limit, although a very generous one. Separately, the terrain is scripted to change at the beginning of some missions: a frigid worldwide winter thaws and plants grow, only to die out as deserts overtake the Earth and bodies of water evaporate. Finally lava flows glow in a landscape of ash and entire oceans are gone from the globe that's the mission selection screen. As the temperature rises the effectiveness of heat-based weapons changes, navies are retired for lack of water to put them in, and the actions available for the Lunar Coalition's weather controller superweapon change. Occasionally the player receives news clips about the construction of the evacuation program or thanks, admonishments, or threats regarding meeting its quotas, but these are cosmetic.

The stand-alone expansion packs The Moon Project and Lost Souls returned to a conventional structure about winning a series of missions.

=== Battles ===
As real-time strategy, Earth 2150 belongs to a genre of wargames marked by ease of use and prompt action, and not by realism or intricate simulation; for example, units are built in seconds in factories on the front lines, paid for by gathering materials in the field. Generally the player builds a base, harvests resources, manufactures units, and seeks to destroy the enemy by issuing units commands such as where to move, what to target, or to halt. Some campaign missions liven this up with objectives such as defending the ambassadors at a summit, and scripted events, such as a hacker capturing robotic UCS units or an alliance falling apart, that can change mission objectives. Another change to the formula in most missions is the landing pad structure, the transport link with the main base, which can supply units for rushes and allow for leaner bases with less need to operate independently - and less ability to rebuild this lifeline should it be cut. Alternately, the player may opt for a single battle ("skirmish") where the goal is always to eliminate the opposition, or for online multiplayer.

The game has ground vehicles, ships, and aircraft, leaving out the infantry from Earth 2140. Units can gain levels, and the game offers a small degree of unit customization where the player builds unit types by choosing the chassis, the weapon or weapons or other equipment, and the name. Unusually, the commands a unit type can receive can be set to only the three above, the RTS standards such as "escort" and "hold position", or an extended set such as "hold area" (ie. pursue enemy units a limited distance) with standing orders such as "retreat at 50% HP." However, this is not available for all unit types and can be changed for units after they are built.

Conventional weapons restock ammo via a flying supply carrier from a depot (for ground or naval units) or a stop at the depot (for air units). This basic logistical trail adds a degree of tactical depth, since e.g. a weak machine gun with extensive stores requires different support than a powerful, long-ranged grenade launcher that's exhausted in a single engagement, and since carriers and other air units will fly in a straight line unless manually commanded and directly into the teeth of enemy air defenses should the player attack from the wrong direction. Energy weapons regenerate ammo, bypass the damage reduction armored chassis have, and tend to be unusual, "gimmick" weapons. For example, while the plasma cannon is merely extremely powerful, the laser does no damage to HP and instead heats enemy units until their ammunition detonates and they explode, making short work of most targets but wearing off if interrupted. They are countered by shields, a second, regenerating health bar that is bypassed by conventional fire but completely stops, and is drained by, energy weapons' damage and special effects until it is depleted. Shields take up no room on units but they cost, trading numbers and therefore firepower for what may be a great increase in survivability.

Defensive emplacements' weapons can be changed for a fee. Unusually, major facilities such as factories can also be armed.

The game has a wide and shallow tech tree. New items are gradually unlocked from mission to mission, and once researched by spending time and resources persist for the rest of the campaign. The tree offers new buildings as well as new and upgraded chassis, weapons, equipment and ammo. Upgrades are generally straightforward strength improvements, but can also be such things as more mounting points for chassis, homing ammunition, or dual, triple or quad guns. The full tree is available in skirmish and multiplayer games, though in some game modes the most powerful weapons can be toggled off.

== Factions ==
United Civilized States: The UCS controls North and South America. They live comfortably, having automated manufacturing, housework, and to a very high degree, all labor and government. The UCS is a demarchy, selecting leaders by lottery, which with minimal positions and short terms has resulted in leaders who do what their AI assistants tell them to do. Humanity's main contribution was when a skilled programmer used his position to make changes to said AIs; glitching, the UCS was responsible for occupying the British Isles and starting the war of Earth 2140 that doomed the planet. As President of the United Civilized States, the player's authority extends to pursuing whatever military objective the AIs order. The all-robotic UCS military favors bipedal mecha on the ground and its air units float with antigravity technology reverse-engineered from a crashed UFO, and its mission briefings and other messages are laconic and emotionless.

UCS units are typically slow and expensive but durable and pack high firepower. For example, they have immediate access to the grenade launcher, a particularly powerful weapon in the particularly narrow role of unguided ground strikes reliant on frequent resupply. Harvester units gather the UCS's resources and can do so rapidly if massed, but this is costlier and vulnerable to attack. During the campaign the UCS develops the plasma cannon, an extremely powerful energy weapon, stealth ("shadow") generators and flying, albeit slightly slower, harvesters.

Eurasian Dynasty: Essentially a revitalized Mongol Empire based in Russia and Mongolia, the ED has an industrial, Soviet theme. In the war of Earth 2140, they were responsible for the catastrophic nuclear strikes near the North Pole that disrupted the Earth's orbit and sent it spiralling towards the Sun. They use primitive technology such as tanks and helicopters, and have the most powerful navy. ED units are typically individually weak but cheap and able to be produced in large numbers, with their starting unit being the Pamir, a reverse-engineered Abrams with a one-man crew. ED mines prepare resources for retrieval by dedicated transports, successfully combining the LC's weakness of low output with the UCS's weakness of vulnerable unarmed vehicles. During the campaign the ED develops lasers and the ion cannon, an energy weapon which stuns units leaving them vulnerable for capture.

Lunar Corporation: The LC is a faction of matriarchal pacifists who have colonized the Moon. They're descended from a private spaceflight company that combined idealism for space exploration with exorbitant wealth from selling off-planet habitation to the ultra-rich during the march to World War III. They cut themselves off from Earth with the outbreak of the war, and although the population's adjustment to physical labor involved a great deal of bloodshed, by the time of the game they've established a harmonious and peaceable society that frankly has no business trying to fight a war.

LC units (armanent of civilian vehicles and flightcrafts) are typically fast and fragile, and the LC tends towards being mechanically unusual and the odd one out, for good and ill; this is a nation that both possesses technological superiority and fields it in converted civilian vehicles, with weapons derived from mining equipment. The LC treats electricity as a map-wide resource in the style of Command & Conquer: its factories and defensive lines aren't susceptible to losing nearby power plants or transmitters. On the other hand it uses solar power, and must charge batteries every day if it's to have power by night. LC mines double as processing buildings, fully automating resource production. LC buildings don't need a construction unit, they're lowered to any explored location on the map, allowing the LC to place mining operations, fortifications, etc. across impassable mountains or behind enemy lines with little warning, but buildings attacked in the air plummet to their doom. Without constructors the LC forgoes terrain manipulation: they alone cannot tunnel, build bridges, excavate or level out impassable trenches, or erect walls (LC laser fence posts are a poor substitute.) The LC has no navy as its ground units all hover on sea as on land, but without bridges they are left with the fraught prospect of amphibious beach landings. In the campaign the player leads the LC in battle as a UCS veteran sent over in an alien craft, the Fang, in exchange for an alliance. Although losing this one-of-a-kind unit means instant failure, the Fang's weapon is capable of easily decimating any opponent it comes across — that is, until its ammo runs out.

== Reception ==
Reception

Aggregate score
Aggregator	Score
Metacritic	78/100

Review scores
Publication	Score
AllGame	3.5/5
CNET Gamecenter	8/10
Computer Games Strategy Plus	3/5
Computer Gaming World	4/5
EP Daily	7/10
Eurogamer	8/10
Game Informer	8.25/10
GameRevolution	C
GameSpot	8.1/10
GameSpy	78%
GameZone	9/10
IGN	8.5/10
PC Gamer (US)	90%

The PC version received "generally favorable reviews" according to the review aggregation website Metacritic. Brian Wright of GamePro was positive to its gameplay, graphics, soundtrack, and sound effects, but concluded that its complexity makes the game more suitable for hardcore players rather than the casual ones. (Note: GamePro gave the PC version 4.5/5 for graphics, 4/5 for sound, and two 3.5/5 scores for control and fun factor.)

In the German market, the game debuted in 22nd place on Media Control's computer game sales rankings for November 1999. It took 25th and 23rd in the first and second halves of December, respectively, before dropping to 27th in January 2000 and 44th in February. The game's sales in the German region had surpassed 60,000 units by May, a performance that publisher Topware Interactive considered acceptable, according to PC Player's Udo Hoffman. He, however, noted that the game had been overshadowed by competitors Command & Conquer: Tiberian Sun and Age of Empires II: The Age of Kings, and remarked that "in retrospect, the date of publication was poorly chosen". David Fioretti of the German retailer PC Fun cited the game's numerous bugs and Topware's reputation as a "cheap brand" as further reasons for its failure to achieve hit status.

The game was a commercial failure in the U.S. CNET Gamecenter's Mark Asher reported in early September 2000 that the game had sold 23,163 units and earned revenues of $873,855 in the country. He felt that this performance "can't be classified as a hit", and with journalist Tom Chick explaining that it "didn't even hit PC Data's charts".

The game won the award for Best Multiplayer Game at the CNET Gamecenter Computer Game Awards for 2000.
