= Earth 2150: The Moon Project =

2000 video game

- Developer: TopWare Interactive
- Publishers: 1C Company; Game Studios
- Platform: Microsoft Windows
- Release: April 2001
- Genre: Strategy
- Mode: Single-player

Earth 2150: The Moon Project is a sequel to the real time strategy game Earth 2150. While the game is in fact a stand-alone game, many consider it an expansion pack because it does little more than provide new missions, and weapons. The story takes place alongside the original game's story. The Moon Project was released in 2001 by 1Company, among others.

== Story ==
Earth's final war is in full swing. The United Civilized States, Eurasian Dynasty, and the Lunar Corporation fight over what is left of the world's resources in order to escape the blue planet before it is destroyed. Meanwhile, on the Moon, the Lunar Corporation discovers the remnants of an alien tunnel system. In it, they find the plans for an orbital super weapon, with the power to attack the Earth from the Moon. While beginning the process of building the weapon, code named "Sunlight", a United Civilized States army appears ready to try to stop them. It is up to the player to decide how it will play out, and who will win.

== Gameplay ==
The Moon Project is a war strategy game. Full three-dimensional play sets it apart from other games in the genre. Players can rotate their cameras to view the battlefield from just about any angle. It also includes an experience system for the units, indicated by a green and black line under the health bar. Higher levels means higher damage, health, and armor. The player must mine resources in order to build units and structures, and must create power plants to keep structures working. The game includes a 10 level campaign for each faction, and multiplayer support is provided.

== Factions ==
The game includes three playable factions. Each has its own unique style and army:

United Civilized States: UCS for short, it consists of the American continents. Their society relies heavily on machinery and robotics, and is ruled by an artificial intelligence. Machines do all tasks for the humans and as a result the population is lazy and hedonistic. Their army consists of mecha without human pilots. When playing as the UCS, the player takes the role of a commander working for the President but more directly to GOLAN and another AI called NEO. The UCS has long been at war with the Eurasian Dynasty. The main weapon of the UCS is the plasma cannon and the larger heavy plasma cannons. While powerful, shields can stop plasma before it can make it to the hull of target vehicles, but enough plasma (does not take much) will eat through the shields quickly and allow quick destruction of everything.

Eurasian Dynasty: ED for short, it controls Europe and Asia and is the most populous of the factions. They are ruled by a descendant of Genghis Khan and follow old Soviet ideology of mass numbers and superior firepower. They are somewhat technologically primitive (by 22nd century standards) relying on 21st century vehicles and weapons, such as tanks, helicopters and large caliber cannons. They do however have some advanced technology in the form of the laser cannon and the ion cannon. The ED dual 120 mm cannons are powerful and can also punch through shields, a useful property in the late game. The ED lack maneuverability compared to the other factions but make up for it by being a slow moving and tough hitting juggernaut that can equip some of its units with tactical nuclear weaponry in the end game.

Lunar Corporation: LC for short, they are descendants of lunar colonists. Since 2084, they severed contact with the Earth when it became apparent that a full-scale nuclear war was about to occur. Since then they have lived peacefully on the Moon. Because of their isolation from the wars of Earth, their society has evolved into a pacifist form. The technology of the LC are far more advanced than that of the other two factions. The main weapon platform of the LC is the hovercraft. Not having been at war for many years, the LC military machine is almost non-existent. They catch on quickly and build some of the more exotic weapons of the game including the electro-cannon, which emits electricity, much like lightning, to destroy targets (the units do not need power like buildings; they recharge themselves and are purely self-sufficient). The sonic-cannon, which emits a moderately powerful radial effect that damages all enemies around it. Another thing to note is that the LC mostly consists of females.

== The game ==
The game plays nearly the same as Earth 2150 with a few key differences:

1. Both LC and UCS campaigns take place on the Moon, with the exception of the first UCS level.

2. Several new vehicles and weapons have been added to the game including mobile transports, artillery, antimissile systems which fire automatically in order to take down incoming enemy missiles and "anti-air" weapons (ED: AA Gun, UCS: AA Plasma Cannon, LC: AA Rocket Launcher), which do heavy amounts of damage to aircraft.

3. The ED campaign introduces an "Advancement system" which allows the player to gain rank (and a cut-scene) upon earning a certain number of points, which are received when objectives are met in missions.

4. The shield system has been changed to even out the defense capabilities of the 3 factions. The power of the shields has been halved.

5. The campaign no longer revolves around sending resources to the player's home base for the construction of an evacuation fleet. Instead, all the resources on the map are added to home base funds when the player successfully destroys all enemy units in the mission and returns to base. Unlike the first game, which required careful conservation of resources to complete a mission and the game, funds are nearly unlimited on each mission.

6. Compared to the original game, all factions have received new additions to their respective arsenals, namely, the new anti-air weapons, which cannot attack ground units but are extremely effective against aerial ones. These new weapons are: the ED's AA Gun, similar to WW2-era anti-air weapons; the UCS' AA Plasma Cannon, which now explains why aircraft should be equipped with shields; and the LC AA Rocket, the one with the longest range of all.

7. New artillery weaponry also appears for the ED and UCS. These are most suitable for destroying structures from a very long distance. Although ED had monopoly over long-range nuclear ballistic missiles, they now also have a rapid firing artillery cannon, added in the most recent patch. In addition, both the ED and the UCS now possess submarine units armed with ballistic missiles (nuclear for ED, plasma for UCS). To counter this, the SDI Defense Center building has been upgraded in the patch: it now shoots down not only nuclear missiles, but the UCS Plasma Control Center's plasma bolts as well, resulting in the LC Weather Control Center remaining as the only truly unstoppable superweapon.

8. Five new chassis types were added: the ED Stealth tank, which is invisible unless its lights are on; the UCS Cargo Salamander, a treaded unit with heavy armor but with the ability to carry the AA Plasma Cannon; the LC Super Fighter, an effective air superiority fighter armed with AA missiles; the LC Fat Girl, a moderately armored unit with four weapon hardpoints; and the LC Tunnel Gouger which removes the factions disadvantage over their inability to modify the terrain without a builder unit. The 2.1 patch also adds a sixth newcomer, the unarmed and silent Scout helicopter for the ED. This eliminates the disadvantage that ED players could not spy on enemy bases because their flying units are all helicopters, which means they are loud compared to the other factions' aircraft and bound to be noticed by the other player.

9. Previously, only the ED and the UCS possessed Repairers capable of capturing enemy units and buildings, but only the ED and LC could disable these objects to be captured. The new Grabber is a rebalancing addition, which gives each side a method of capturing enemy buildings without the need to disable them, but the player can only use a captured production building if it is on the same faction. This means it is impossible, for example, to be with ED and capture an LC Main Base then begin unit production. Finally, each side can now sell buildings and recycle units to receive half of the original price in credits. This way, the player can evacuate/recycle all units and sell every building except the Landing Zone at the end of each mission for maximum resource gain. Coupled with the Grabber, it is actually more beneficial now to leave enemy structures intact, but capture and sell them.
