= Lost River =

Lost River may refer to:

== Communities ==
=== Australia ===
- Lost River, New South Wales

=== Canada ===
- Lost River, Quebec, part of Harrington, Quebec
- Rural Municipality of Lost River No. 313, Saskatchewan

=== United States ===
- Lost River, Idaho
- Lost River, Indiana
- Lost River Township, Martin County, Indiana
- Lost River, Kentucky
- Lost River, West Virginia

== Rivers ==
- Losing stream, a river that decreases in volume as it flows

=== United States ===
- In Alaska:
  - Lost River (Bering Sea)
  - Lost River (Nowitna River tributary), a tributary to the Nowitna River
- Lost River (California), in California and Oregon
- Big Lost River, Idaho
- Little Lost River, Idaho
- Lost River (Indiana)
- In Minnesota:
  - Lost River (Clearwater River tributary)
  - Lost River (Nett Lake)
  - Lost River (Roseau River tributary)
  - Lost River (Tamarac River tributary)
  - Lost River (Thief River tributary)
- Lost River (New Hampshire)
- Lost River (Methow River tributary), a tributary to the Methow River
- Lost River (Cacapon River tributary), in West Virginia

== Other uses ==
- Lost River (film), a 2014 American film directed by Ryan Gosling
- The Lost River, 2014 book by Michel Danino subtitled On The Trail of the Sarasvati
- "The Lost River", an episode of The Wind in the Willows
- Lost River Cave, Kentucky
- Lost River Caverns, Pennsylvania
- Lost River State Forest, Minnesota
- Lost River Athletic Conference, a 1970s high school conference in Indiana
- Lost River Jr./Sr. High School, serving Merrill, Oregon
