= State of Mind EP =

EP by Clockwork Radio
- Released: 4 July 2010
- Recorded: 2010
- Genre: Alternative rock
- Length: 16:21
- Label: Poly Tune

Singles from State of mind EP
- 1. "Lost" Released: 28 November 2007; 2. "Foxtrot Bravado" Released: 14 October 2008

State of Mind EP is the first studio album by the English alternative rock band Clockwork Radio. Produced by the band, the album was released on 4 July 2010 on the band's own label, Poly Tune.

== Track listing ==
All lyrics are written by Clockwork Radio; all music is composed by Clockwork Radio

State of Mind EP
No.	Title	Length
1.	"Lost"	4:28
2.	"Foxtrot Bravado"	3:40
3.	"State of Mind"	3:40
4.	"Moonstruck"	4:30
Total length:		16:21

== Members ==
- Rich Williams – vocals, guitar
- Dan Wiebe – percussion
- Iwan Jones – vocals, guitar
- Nadim Mirshak – vocals, bass
- Sam Quinn – piano, synths
