= Earth 2160 =

2005 video game

- Developer: Reality Pump Studios
- Publishers: EU: Zuxxez Entertainment / Deep Silver; NA: Midway Games
- Designer: Mirosław Dymek
- Platforms: Windows, Linux
- Release: DE: June 2005; PL: June 2005; RU: June 2005; NA: November 14, 2005; EU: September 2005; Steam: April 1, 2006; SteamOS: February 16, 2016
- Genre: Real-time strategy
- Modes: Single-player, multiplayer

Earth 2160 is a real-time strategy video game, developed by Reality Pump Studios. A third entry in the Earth series, it is a direct sequel to Earth 2150. The release of the game was staggered, originally published in Russia, Germany, and Poland in June 2005, then released in the rest of Europe in September with North America receiving the latest release of the game November. It was also released on Valve's Steam platform in April 2006, and later from Good Old Games in 2009. The game continues the dystopic themes of the previous Earth games, and is set in numerous locales throughout the Solar System.

== Plot ==
In Earth 2150, the three factions of the United Civilised States (UCS), the Eurasian Dynasty (ED) and the Lunar Corporation (LC) raced to build starships and evacuate the Earth before it became uninhabitable due to being destroyed by the sun. All three factions succeeded and sent ships to Mars, but the UCS colony ship inexplicably disappeared en route. Both the ED and LC set about the difficult and lengthy task of terraforming Mars independently of one another, and also set up outposts on the outer planets and moons.

In Earth 2160, the player initially takes the perspective of Major Michael Falkner of the ED forces. Falkner completes various missions for his ED superiors, largely against the LC, until he is sent to investigate a biological research operation that has gone silent. Upon reaching it an insectoid alien race is found, which then becomes the primary antagonist. At the end of the ED campaign, Falkner is betrayed by his superiors, who fear his idealism and imprison him.

The game then shifts to the perspective of Commander Heldin Ariah, an LC commander who has gone rogue, and the player begins commanding LC units. The aliens are revealed to be the "Morphidians", and that the scientist who was studying them, Van Troff, has biologically altered himself to become their leader in an attempt to conquer the Solar System. Ariah frees Falkner from imprisonment, and they discover the lost UCS colony ship the Phoenix and ally with its artificial intelligence.

The player then switches to controlling UCS units. The player discovers an interstellar gateway and explores another solar system with a habitable planet, "Eden". They discover the origin of the Morphidians - they were constructed by a race called "The Builders" as a bioweapon. After some time opposing the aliens, they ambush Falkner, capturing and subverting him.

The player then switches to the perspective of Falkner, biologically altered by Van Troff to serve him, commanding Morphidian units against his former allies. After several successes, Falkner is commanded to kill unarmed civilians, and he refuses, breaking Van Troff's control. Falkner turns his Morphidian units against Van Troff, and with the assistance of Ariah and the Phoenix's AI kills him and ends the threat to humanity.

== Gameplay ==
An "agent" system allows factions to hire freelance persons each with their own specific abilities. Some assist scientific research, others in reconnaissance, resource harvesting and so forth. Each recalls his previous contracts, this affects price. Further, they have an attitude towards their fellow agents, ranging from love to resentment. Research plays a major part in Earth 2160, and factions can choose numerous technologies to research, often at the same time. Research centers are still prevalent, and the number constructed will have an effect on the speed of research. Earth 2160 uses modular construction, in which buildings and units can be constructed from a wide assortment of basic parts. The game economy is based upon three material types: Water, Metal, and Crystals.

=== Multiplayer ===
A total of ten skirmish maps and four multiplayer modes exist. Players also have the option to save their multiplayer games to finish at a later date. The multiplayer servers are hosted from EarthNet, and a ladder and league is included. A maximum of eight players may join a game. Spectator mode and Replays are also included. There is also an option to join a running game, which many real-time strategy games don't have.

=== Development of EarthNet 2 ===
Development of EarthNet 2, which was meant to replace the old EarthNet after release, was stopped in mid-2006. This caused enragement among the community as it was perceived that ZuxxeZ blamed the community for the failure of its development, as it was being developed with members of the community. In addition, ZuxxeZ considered the multiplayer feature of Earth 2160 unimportant, as only 10% of all users of the game ever went online with it.

== Development ==
=== Engine ===
Earth-4 is the graphics engine used in Earth 2160. It is a 3D engine developed to make a highly detailed environment and AI. It also has a hardware version that supports pyrotechnic and lighting effects. It was developed by Mariusz Szaflik.

The game uses the Earth-4 engine, which uses a T&L rendering module supporting pixel shading and bone calculation direct to ones graphics card. Bump mapping, lighting effects and detailed units are also present.

The game uses an AI system which employs linear back framing algorithms to learn from its mistakes and become increasingly competent in battle as the game progresses.

=== Anti-piracy actions ===
In 2005 Zuxxez Entertainment hired law firm Schutt-Waetke to charge more than 18,000 German filesharers for copyright violation. Fines between 150 and 650 Euros were levied. The producer Dirk Hassinger had noticed that there were far more players on the online game server than registered buyers (all the game's copy protection systems had been hacked and a small program was automatically generating serial numbers), leading him to start monitoring the filesharing networks for illegal shares. The Swiss firm Logistep offered him a package that would gather data valid for legal actions and automatically generate the charges ready for digital submission to the court in Karlsruhe. Two weeks later Hassinger's lawyer submitted one CD-ROM containing 13,700 charges to the court, each one also printed as a courtesy. By post each defendant received an offer: pay 50 Euros and the case would be dropped. Hassinger's lawyers also sent demands that each downloader sign an undertaking to never again share copyrighted software, plus an invoice for 200 to 500 Euros.

== Reception ==
Reception

Aggregate score
Aggregator	Score
Metacritic	73/100

Review scores
Publication	Score
Eurogamer	7/10
GameSpot	7.3/10
GameSpy	3/5
IGN	7.9/10
