= Stargate SG-1 season 9 =

Season of television series

Stargate SG-1
- Season 9
- DVD cover
- Starring: Ben Browder; Amanda Tapping; Christopher Judge; Beau Bridges; Michael Shanks
- No. of episodes: 20

Release
- Original network: Syfy
- Original release: July 15, 2005 – March 10, 2006

Season chronology
- ← Previous; Season 8 Next → Season 10

The ninth season of Stargate SG-1, an American-Canadian television series, began airing on July 15, 2005, on SCI FI. The ninth season concluded on March 10, 2006, after 20 episodes on the same channel. The series was originally developed by Brad Wright and Jonathan Glassner, and Brad Wright, Robert C. Cooper, Joseph Mallozzi and Paul Mullie served as executive producers. The season arc centers on the new threat of the Ori, a race who Daniel Jackson (Michael Shanks) and Vala Mal Doran (Claudia Black) unleash in an unknown galaxy, and who are threatening to prepare for a crusade into the Milky Way galaxy to convert the beings to their religion called Origin.

Season nine regular cast members included Ben Browder, Amanda Tapping, Christopher Judge, with Beau Bridges, and Michael Shanks. Claudia Black appeared in a recurring role for eight episodes. The ninth season begins with General Hank Landry (Beau Bridges) having assumed command of Stargate Command, and newcomer Lt. Col. Cameron Mitchell (Ben Browder) trying to regroup the SG-1 team after the events of the eighth season.

== Production ==
=== Development ===
The burning of Vala in "Avalon (Part 2)" was a challenging sequence for safety reasons and for still making it believable. Stunt people stood in for the fire scenes that Claudia Black couldn't film. Locked-off cameras and different "plates" were later combined to so-called VisFX compshots. The episode "Crusade" was Robert C. Cooper's first time directing on the show. All of Vala's voiceovers in that episode were filmed beforehand so that the director could pick which parts would be voiceover and which parts would be shown.

Since the environment of Vancouver, British Columbia, Canada, where SG-1 and Atlantis were primarily filmed, was being developed, shooting locations were getting rarer for new offworld stories. The producers countered this with a new reusable village set, with almost 280 feet (85m) in length and 12000 sqfoot (1100 m^{2}) in area, the biggest they ever built. It was an interior and exterior practical set on an effects stage. Three weeks passed between initial conception until building began, although portions had already been built the previous year. Two further weeks passed before filming began. The inspiration for the set were medieval villages, Japanese homes, and Italian structures and buildings. "The Ties That Bind" marks the first appearance of the Atlantis-style wormhole effect on the actual series, rather than in just the opening credits.

=== Cast ===
Ben Browder and Beau Bridges joined the main cast in Season 9, as Cameron Mitchell and Hank Landry, respectively. Richard Dean Anderson had left the main cast after Season 8 to spend more time with his young daughter in Los Angeles. Despite being listed in the cast credits for the whole season and short scenes in Avalon (Part 1), Amanda Tapping as Samantha Carter is absent during the first five episodes as she was in the last stages of pregnancy at that time. Her empty spot was filled by guest star Claudia Black, who would leave in "Beachhead" and return for the last two episodes of Season 9, which involved her real-life pregnancy. Another new recurring actor was Lexa Doig as Carolyn Lam, Landry's daughter and the new doctor at Stargate Command.

=== Writing ===
After writing the end of Season 8 as the third series finale in a row and having a positive creative experience with the first season of Stargate Atlantis, the producers considered starting a new spin-off show called Stargate Command, but the Sci Fi Channel chose to renew the series into a ninth season. With the departure of Richard Dean Anderson, the producers then decided to start a new chapter and introduced new elements into the series. A major change was the departure from Egyptian mythology and the Goa'uld Empire which had found its climax in the season 8 episode "Threads", and the introduction of Arthurian mythology. "Avalon" was treated like a pilot film, consisting of originally two episodes, but a long script resulted in the extension of the story into the episode "Origin", in which the Ori make their first appearance as new antagonistic race.

The title of the episode "Ex Deus Machina" is a hyperbaton of "deus ex machina" (literally "God out of a Machine", meaning "God appearing on a crane", a literary device for a kind of turn of events) after he jokingly suggested to his writing partners a plot about Ba'al working undercover as a mechanic on Earth. The title also makes a reference to Ba'al as an ex-deus (a former god).

The episode "Ripple Effect" was overly long and had many scenes edited and cut for time. Writer Joseph Mallozzi later posted script sections of all cut scenes online. Asked what the cryptic remark by Black Mitchell meant when he left through the gate at the end of the episode, Mallozzi answered the meaning of this remark will not be revealed in the series but might come up in the Stargate SG-1 sequels, Stargate: The Ark of Truth and Stargate: Continuum. "Camelot" was the first Stargate SG-1 season finale since "Revelations" that was not intended to be the SG-1 series finale, and the first one since "Exodus" that was a cliffhanger. The episode was written without the knowledge that Stargate SG-1 would be picked up for a tenth season.

== Release and reception ==
Promotional image for season nine. From left to right: Amanda Tapping as Samantha Carter, Michael Shanks as Daniel Jackson, Christopher Judge as Teal'c and Ben Browder as Cameron Mitchell

The Sci Fi Channel cut the opening sequences of the first ten episodes of the season from sixty to ten seconds for the original broadcast. The sequence only displayed the "Stargate SG-1" logo and a "Created by" credit, main cast credits were displayed during the teaser. Fans had been very negative about this move. British Sky One only aired the first part of "Avalon" with the short opening sequence.

The highest rated Season 9 episode was the season premier two-parter "Avalon" with a household rating of 2.1 each, and held steady between 1.8 and 2.0 until the midseason finale "The Fourth Horseman", which finished with 1.8. The second part of the season oscillated between 1.6 and 1.9 and finished with a household rating of 1.9. The season rating average was 1.8. A review in TV Guide Special #67 considered Mitchell's introduction in "Avalon" still too reminiscent of the production team's own efforts to turn around the Season Eight finale. Although the review embraced Black's "sparky, sarky characterization of Vala" during Amanda Tapping's absence, the renewed encounter between former Farscape cast members Ben Browder and Claudia Black was "oddly ... underplayed". The review found a strong similarity of the last ten minutes of "Avalon" (Part 1) to Indiana Jones and the Last Crusade, and the set of the beginning of Part 2 as a "god-awful Merrie Olde England pastiche straight out of Monty Python and the Holy Grail." Plotting and technobabble were mentioned as other detrimental facets of Part 2.

The ninth season of Stargate SG-1 was nominated for several awards in 2006, but won none. "Origin" was nomininated for a Gemini Award in the category "Best Achievement in Make-Up", while both "Beachhead" and "Camelot" were nominated for "Best Visual Effects". "Camelot" was also nominated for a Gemini for "Best Sound in a Dramatic Series". Director of Photography Jim Menard was nominated for a Leo Award in the category "Best Cinematography in a Dramatic Series". Ben Browder and Claudia Black were nominated for a Saturn Award in the categories "Best Actor on Television" and "Best Supporting Actress on Television", respectively. Stargate SG-1 was also nominated in the Saturn category "Best Syndicated/Cable Television Series", but lost to Battlestar Galactica, then in its second season.

== Main cast ==
- Starring Ben Browder as Lt. Colonel Cameron Mitchell
- Amanda Tapping as Lt. Colonel Samantha Carter
- Christopher Judge as Teal'c
- With Beau Bridges as Major General Hank Landry
- And Michael Shanks as Dr. Daniel Jackson

== Episodes ==
Episodes in bold are continuous episodes, where the story spans over 2 or more episodes.

No. overall	No. in season	Title	Directed by	Written by	Original release date	US viewers (millions)
175	1	"**Avalon**"	Andy Mikita	Teleplay by : Robert C. Cooper; Excerpts written by : Robert C. Cooper & Brad Wright	July 15, 2005	2.1
176	2	"**Avalon**"	Andy Mikita	Robert C. Cooper	July 22, 2005	2.1
Part 1: Lt. Colonel Cameron Mitchell is recruited by the SGC as leader of SG-1 but finds the original SG-1 has disbanded. He is seeking a way to bring them back together when Vala Mal Doran arrives with an artifact which could reveal an ancient treasure. He decides this is his opportunity to reunite the team. Part 2: After passing all of the tests found in Avalon, the makeshift SG-1 discovers the treasure, along with an Ancient long-range communication device. Hoping to find actual Ancients, Daniel and Vala are given control of the bodies of two people in a distant galaxy, although... it's not what they expected.
177	3	"**Origin**"	Brad Turner	Robert C. Cooper	July 29, 2005	2.0
When Daniel and Vala follow a mysterious man to find answers to their questions, they discover the Ori. The Ori, like the Ancients, are ascended beings, but evil and feeling a need to be worshipped. They have no rules to restrict themselves. Unknowingly, Daniel and Vala reveal that life in our galaxy was created by their long forgotten enemies. They begin to send their missionaries, Priors, through the Stargate. The first planet visited by a Prior in the Milky Way is P3X-421 and the SGC pays him a visit.
178	4	"The Ties That Bind"	William Waring	Joseph Mallozzi & Paul Mullie	August 5, 2005	2.0
Hoping to disconnect the kor mak bracelets effects keeping them linked ("Avalon"), Daniel, Teal'c, Mitchell, and Vala try to pry the information out of the person she stole them from in the first place. When he wants something in return, they discover that his request isn't so easy to complete, and they must go on a series of quests to fulfill his demand.
179	5	"The Powers That Be"	William Waring	Martin Gero	August 12, 2005	2.0
In order to steer the planet P8X-412 away from Origin, SG-1 is tricked by Vala into going to the planet she previously ruled as a Goa'uld. The inhabitants of the planet know nothing of the downfall of the parasites, and they believe that Vala is still their goddess. At SG-1's urging, Vala confesses her fraud to the inhabitants, hoping to instill a sense of skepticism among them, to serve as a psychological defense against the prior who is due to return.
180	6	"Beachhead"	Brad Turner	Brad Wright	August 19, 2005	1.9
Samantha Carter returns to the SGC when the Ori seize control of a planet named Kallana as a foothold in the Milky Way Galaxy. After several attempts to halt the process, they discover that they have been helping the Ori achieve their goal, instead of foiling their efforts. The Ori have been building an enormous Stargate to allow their ships to enter the Milky Way, but they are stopped when Vala takes a cargo ship and uses it to disrupt the formation of the Ori Stargate. The cargo ship is destroyed in the process, and SG-1 fears she is dead, but Carter suggests the possibility that she got trapped in the Ori galaxy.
181	7	"Ex Deus Machina"	Martin Wood	Joseph Mallozzi & Paul Mullie	August 26, 2005	1.9
After Ba'al contacts Stargate Command, they learn he has been living on earth for several months as the head of a major corporation. His demands are that he is allowed to live in peace, or he will blow up a naqahdah bomb somewhere in America. Yet Gerak is determined to capture him... and takes a less "subtle" route. The bomb proves impossible to disarm, so Prometheus beams it into space where it detonates harmlessly, but Ba'al escapes with his many clones at his disposal.
182	8	"Babylon"	Peter DeLuise	Damian Kindler	September 9, 2005	2.0
A group of legendary Jaffa attacks SG-1 on a planet designated P9G-844 and captures Mitchell. While the rest of the team is forced to retreat, Mitchell is accused of killing one of the Jaffa. As punishment, he must square off against the slain Jaffa's brother, but he could be Mitchell's salvation.
183	9	"Prototype"	Peter DeLuise	Alan McCullough	September 16, 2005	1.8
SG-1 finds a man frozen in Ancient stasis on P3X-584, and brings him back to the SGC to find out his story. But when Daniel researches the laboratory where the man was found, he discovers that he was grown by Anubis to be a genetically advanced human.
184	10	"**The Fourth Horseman**"	Andy Mikita	Damian Kindler	September 16, 2005	1.8
185	11	"**The Fourth Horseman**"	Andy Mikita	Joseph Mallozzi & Paul Mullie	January 6, 2006	1.9
Part 1: When a disease breaks out across America, evidence leads it to be the Ori's doing. Preparing to track down a viable cure, an old friend (Orlin) takes on an unfamiliar human form to help out, but it might not be enough when the team's adverse ally joins the Ori. Part 2: While Orlin is working on a cure for the Prior plague, Mitchell and Daniel capture a Prior offworld to further the research of the antidote. Teal'c tries to stop Gerak, now a Prior, from corrupting the entire Jaffa Council towards Origin. Teal'c ultimately convinces Gerak to switch sides. Gerak cures the SGC of the plague, but it costs him his life. Thanks to Gerak's efforts and Orlin's work, a cure is found for everyone else, but Orlin now has brain damage and no memory of who he is and is put in a mental hospital.
186	12	"Collateral Damage"	William Waring	Joseph Mallozzi & Paul Mullie	January 13, 2006	1.7
SG-1 encounters the Galarans, a civilization that flourished under the umbrella of the Asgard Protected Planets Treaty, after centuries of Goa'uld domination. Due to the disengagement of the Asgard from the Milky Way, the Galarans have become concerned for their safety and developed a memory-grafting device, with which they hope to accelerate their technological development. They are eager to trade this technology with Earth in exchange for hyperdrive technology. After Mitchell's first dose of the memory-grafting device, he is accused of murder. Now the rest of the team must ally themselves with local scientists to prove his innocence.
187	13	"Ripple Effect"	Peter DeLuise	Story by : Brad Wright, Joseph Mallozzi & Paul Mullie; Teleplay by : Joseph Mallozzi & Paul Mullie	January 20, 2006	1.8
More than fifteen SG-1 teams arrive at Stargate Command, one team at a time, leading the 'real' team to conclude that each of the teams have been inadvertently displaced from different parallel realities. One SG-1 team that arrived has Stargate Command's Dr. Janet Fraiser and the Tok'ra leader Martouf as members, both of whom have been dead for two years in the current reality. The events are ultimately revealed to be a plan by the SG-1 team that arrived first to steal Atlantis' ZPM to save their own Earth, but the 'real' SG-1 foils them and sends everyone home.
188	14	"Stronghold"	Peter DeLuise	Teleplay by : Alan McCullough; Excerpts written by : Robert C. Cooper, Martin Gero and Brad Wright	January 27, 2006	1.8
Ba'al brainwashes members of the Jaffa High Council to thwart their move towards democracy. Cameron Mitchell faces a tough decision when he learns that an old friend is about to die.
189	15	"Ethon"	Ken Girotti	Story by : Damian Kindler & Robert C. Cooper; Teleplay by : Damian Kindler	February 3, 2006	1.6
The Rand Protectorate ("Icon") converts to Origin and is rewarded with the design for a powerful satellite weapon, which they threaten to use against the Caledonians. When Prometheus tries to disable the satellite it destroys the ship, although most of the crew escape to Caledonia. They are ultimately able to return to Earth through the planet's Stargate but after doing so, dialogue between Rand and Caledonia breaks down and the two nations annihilate one another.
190	16	"Off the Grid"	Peter DeLuise	Alan McCullough	February 10, 2006	1.6
SG-1 is captured on an alien world after a deal with the Lucian Alliance goes bad ... and the planet's Stargate goes missing. SG-1 is rescued by the new Earth ship Odyssey and they go on a successful mission to retrieve all of the stolen Stargates from Ba'al.
191	17	"The Scourge"	Ken Girotti	Joseph Mallozzi & Paul Mullie	February 17, 2006	1.6
The Ori have engineered a bioweapon of bugs (known as R-75 or "Prior bugs"), asexual, fast-reproducing, omnivorous insects. When given meat, they multiply rapidly and become voracious swarming predators, able to strip a human to the bone in moments. They prefer darkness and hunt via echolocation. When a group of Earth diplomats visit the off-world Gamma Site research base, R-75 overrun the base and consume most of the base personnel. SG-1 must flee to a research site and set up a message to alert the Odyssey to rescue them when it arrives. The Odyssey rescues SG-1 and the delegates and destroys the bugs with a toxin, but the Prior bugs are spreading on other planets.
192	18	"Arthur's Mantle"	Peter DeLuise	Alan McCullough	February 24, 2006	1.7
Mitchell and Carter are shifted to another dimension, making them invisible to everyone at the SGC. Teal'c and SG-12 discover that the Sodan have been brutally attacked.
193	19	"**Crusade**"	Robert C. Cooper	Robert C. Cooper	March 3, 2006	1.8
Vala Mal Doran makes contact with Stargate Command from the Ori home galaxy, and tells the story of her life undercover in a village of followers building the Ori's invasion fleet and her mysterious pregnancy. She ultimately joins an anti-Ori resistance movement with plans to destroy the fleet, but the plan fails and Vala is nearly killed by her husband Tomin before she convinces him to spare her and take her with him to war in the Milky Way galaxy.
194	20	"**Camelot**"	Martin Wood	Joseph Mallozzi & Paul Mullie	March 10, 2006	1.9
SG-1 discovers the village of Camelot on PX1-767 and must face Merlin's security system when they go in search of an Ancient weapon. The Ori invasion begins. A fleet composed of ships from all over the Milky Way made up of the Earth ships Odyssey and Korelev along with ships from the Free Jaffa, Tok'ra, Lucian Alliance as well as one Asgard ship, face off against four Ori ships and are decimated. The Korelev is destroyed with Daniel and Mitchell on board. Vala, on another ship, can only watch the devastation in horror as she starts to go into labor.

== Home releases ==
DVD name	Region 1	Region 2	Region 4
Stargate SG-1 Season 9	October 3, 2006	February 5, 2007	August 16, 2006
Volume 44 (901–904)	—	March 27, 2006	—
Volume 45 (905–908)	—	April 24, 2006	—
Volume 46 (909–911)	—	May 22, 2006	—
Volume 47 (912–914)	—	June 19, 2006	—
Volume 48 (915–917)	—	July 17, 2006	—
Volume 49 (918–920)	—	August 14, 2006	—
