= Avalon (Stargate SG-1) =

- Stargate SG-1 episodes
- Episode nos.: Season 9 Episodes 1 & 2
- Directed by: Andy Mikita
- Written by: Robert C. Cooper
- Production codes: 901 & 902
- Original air dates: July 15, 2005; July 22, 2005

Guest appearances
- Claudia Black as Vala Mal Doran; Richard Dean Anderson as Jack O'Neill; Obi Ndefo as Rak'nor; Gary Jones as Walter Harriman; Bill Dow as Bill Lee; Lexa Doig as Carolyn Lam; Matthew Walker as Merlin; April Amber Telek as Sallis; Steven Park as Harrid; Paul Moniz De Sá as Fannis; Penelope Corrin as Dr. Lindsey; Greg Anderson as Administrator; Silya Wiggins as Therapist; Mark Houghton as Prior #1

Episode chronology
← Previous "Moebius"	Next → "Origin"
- Stargate SG-1 (season 9)

"Avalon" (Parts 1 and 2) are the Season 9 premiere episodes of the science fiction television series Stargate SG-1. They marked the beginning of a "new" Stargate SG-1 that continued after the ending of the previous season. Despite seeing the departure of Richard Dean Anderson's Jack O'Neill, it sees the introduction of Ben Browder as Lt. Colonel Cameron Mitchell, Beau Bridges as Major General Hank Landry, and Lexa Doig as Dr. Carolyn Lam. They also bring in Claudia Black's character Vala Mal Doran as a recurring character, later to become a regular in Season 10, and introduce entire new storylines including further information about the Ancients, their links to Arthurian legends, and their origins.

== Plot overview ==
=== Part 1 ===
Lieutenant Cameron Mitchell sits at Stargate Command staring at the Stargate. After his efforts and recovery from his injuries, Jack O'Neill offered him any job he liked, and he wished to join SG-1. However, when he arrives at the base, he finds that SG-1 has been disbanded, a new general is in control, and he is set to pick and lead the new team. The new general is Hank Landry, a friend of both George Hammond and O'Neill. Mitchell begins the selection process for new members of SG-1, but is dissatisfied with the candidates.

Teal'c is on the planet Dakara, the capital of the Free Jaffa Nation, the aftermath of the fall of the Goa'uld Empire at the end of season eight. Samantha Carter has been moved to Area 51, where she is aiding in research and development. O'Neill has been promoted out of the SGC, and Daniel Jackson is set to take a ride on board the Daedalus to Atlantis.

An unscheduled off-world activation admits Vala Mal Doran into Stargate Command (SGC), and she claims to have something they want. They let her in and she immediately seeks out Daniel. She has a tablet written in Ancient that leads to a trove of hidden Ancient treasures, and she needs Daniel to translate it. However, as soon as they are close together, she throws a pair of cuffs onto their wrists, linking them together. This causes Daniel to miss his trip to Atlantis. Instead he translates the tablet and who wrote it: an Ancient fleeing Atlantis after the war with the Wraith named Myrddin, who Daniel says is Merlin. After further research, Daniel concludes that the treasure is located beneath Glastonbury Tor in England.

Arriving there on the Prometheus, they transport into a hidden cavern where a hologram of Merlin tells them that only the true will gain access to the treasures of the Ancients. There is a sword in a stone, but Mitchell is unable to remove it. They continue to explore further; Daniel and Vala take a right passageway, and Mitchell and Teal'c take a left. Both parties find rooms which light up upon entry. In both rooms the doors lock shut automatically, and the parties encounter puzzles. Just when they think it can't get any worse, the ceiling begins lowering to crush them, and to escape they must solve the puzzles quickly or be crushed.

=== Part 2 ===
Trapped along with Teal'c and Vala Mal Doran far beneath England's Glastonbury Tor, Daniel Jackson and Cameron Mitchell have only seconds to outwit the Ancient snares in which they're caught. Once they succeed, they have to handle only one or two more small details – such as a near-impossible sword fight with an inhuman knight – before they win access to the cave's vast treasure. Amid the standard-issue gold and jewels, Daniel uncovers a hoard of books apparently written by the Ancients. They tell a fantastic tale: The highly advanced Ancients may have called themselves the Altera, and possibly evolved in a far distant galaxy. The crew excavating the treasure also finds a piece of Ancient equipment, which Daniel believes is a communications device. Daniel persuades Mitchell and General Landry to let him test the machine.

Within seconds, he and Vala – whose lives are still bound to one another by the Jaffa bracelets – drop to the ground, unconscious. Already developing a keen sense of how things work at the SGC, Mitchell deduces that this is a bad sign and puts the two under medical supervision. Similarly worried, Teal'c skips a critical meeting of the new Jaffa High Council to stay by his friend Daniel's side.

Meanwhile, Daniel and Vala find themselves inhabiting the bodies of two married villagers on a distant planet. Being married to Vala – in even the remotest possible sense – gives Daniel the creeps, and he learns that the villagers are devout worshippers of all-powerful and unforgiving beings called the Ori. What's worse, the two people whose bodies Daniel and Vala are inhabiting are suspected of heresy against these mysterious gods.

Before long, Vala ends up chained to a sacrificial altar, about to be burned to death by the village's Administrator and his fanatical followers. Restrained by the vehement villagers, there's nothing Daniel can do but watch in horror as the flames are lit. Back on Earth, Mitchell and the others are watching, too, while Vala slips toward death. As Daniel holds Vala's charred body, a man in robes holding an ornate staff approaches the altar. The staff begins to glow, and Daniel watches in amazement as he brings Vala back to life. Daniel thanks him, but he responds, "Thank the Ori". He then tells them to follow him out of the square, and they follow.

== Production ==
"Avalon (Part 2)" is the first episode of the series to prominently feature only two members of the original cast: Michael Shanks (Daniel Jackson) and Christopher Judge (Teal'c). Richard Dean Anderson had left the main cast after Season 8 in order to spend more time with his young daughter in Los Angeles. Despite being listed in the cast credits, Amanda Tapping as Samantha Carter only appears once in a video conference, as she was in the last stages of pregnancy at that time and in one other scene. Her empty spot was filled by guest star Claudia Black. Ben Browder and Beau Bridges join the main cast in this episode, as Cameron Mitchell and Hank Landry, respectively. With "Avalon (Part 2)", Christopher Judge (Teal'c) passed Amanda Tapping in the number of episode appearances and is the cast member with the most appearances on Stargate SG-1. Tapping would later pass Judge in number of overall appearances when she joined the cast of Stargate Atlantis.

"Avalon" marked the first Stargate SG-1 episode where SCI FI Channel chose to cut the opening sequences to 10-seconds for the original broadcast, rather than the usual 60-seconds (this was paralleled to Stargate Atlantis). The sequence only displayed the "Stargate SG-1" logo and a "Created by" credit, main cast credits were displayed during the teaser. Fans had been very negative about this move. On Sky One in both Ireland and the United Kingdom however, the short opening sequence was only used for Part 1 but not Part 2, where a full length title sequence was restored, incorporating new cast credits. The full length title sequence was also used again when "Avalon" aired in US Syndication.

Matthew Walker guest-starred as the hologram of Merlin, and previously portrayed another Ancient named Moros in the Stargate Atlantis episode "Before I Sleep". In the Season Ten episode "The Pegasus Project", it is revealed that they are indeed the same person. Walker also played King Roham in the Season Two episode "Touchstone".

== Reception ==
Stephen Graves said in a TV Zone review that Mitchell's introduction in this two-part episode was entertaining enough to distract what was deemed "a little too reminiscent of the production team's own efforts to turn around the season eight finale". It perceived the renewed encounter between former Farscape cast members Ben Browder and Claudia Black to be "oddly ... underplayed", but generally embraces Black's "sparky, sarky characterization of Vala" during Amanda Tapping's absence. The review notes the strong similarities of the last ten minutes of "Avalon" (Part 1) to Indiana Jones and the Last Crusade, and the set of the beginning of Part 2 as a "god-awful Merrie Olde England pastiche straight out of Monty Python and the Holy Grail. Plotting and technobabble were mentioned as other detrimental facets of Part 2.
