= Vala Mal Doran =

Fiction character from the Stargate franchise

- Claudia Black as Vala Mal Doran in the Stargate SG-1 Season 9 episode, "The Ties That Bind"
- First appearance: "Prometheus Unbound" (SG-1)
- Last appearance: "Continuum"
- Created by: Robert C. Cooper; Damian Kindler
- Portrayed by: Claudia Black

In-universe information
- Species: Human
- Family: Jacek (father); Adria (step-mother); Daniel (husband); Tomin (ex-husband); Adria (daughter)

Vala Mal Doran is a fictional character in the American military science fiction television series Stargate SG-1 about a military team exploring the galaxy via a network of alien transportation devices. Played by former Farscape actress Claudia Black, Vala was created by Damian Kindler and Robert C. Cooper as a guest character for the season 8 episode "Prometheus Unbound" (2004). Because of the on-screen chemistry between Black's Vala and Michael Shanks' character Daniel Jackson and the character's popularity with the producers and the audience, Claudia Black became a recurring guest star in season 9 (2005–2006) and joined the main cast in season 10 (2006–2007).

"Prometheus Unbound" introduces Vala as a seductive and mischievous human with a Goa'uld background from an unnamed planet. In season 9, Vala and Daniel set off the arc of the show's new villain race, the Ori. After giving birth to the Ori's new leader in season 10, Vala joins the SG-1 team to stop the enemy, eventually becoming a permanent member of both SG-1 and Stargate Command. Claudia Black resumed her role in the 2008 direct-to-DVD film Stargate: The Ark of Truth, which finishes the Ori arc. Black also appeared as Vala and her Goa'uld alter ego Qetesh in the 2008 film Stargate: Continuum. However, she was not supposed to return for the announced third Stargate SG-1 direct-to-DVD film that was scheduled to be filmed in spring 2009, but was abandoned. For her portrayal of Vala, Claudia Black was nominated for a 2006 Saturn Award in the category "Best Supporting Actress on Television", and won a Constellation Award in the category "Best Female Performance in a 2006 Science Fiction Television" in 2007.

== Role in Stargate ==
=== Character arc ===
Information about Vala's past is revealed over the course of several episodes of seasons 8 through 10 of Stargate SG-1. "Family Ties" gives insight into Vala's background with her father Jacek, a con artist who had left her and her mother to pursue his scams. As mentioned in "Flesh and Blood", Vala also had a stepmother named Adria, whom she held in little regard. Vala became an involuntary host to a Goa'uld named Qetesh in her adult life, but the Tok'ra were able to remove the symbiote. At the time of Vala's first encounter with SG-1 team member Daniel Jackson in the season 8 episode "Prometheus Unbound", she has become a thief and a con artist. She attempts to steal the Earth ship Prometheus for her own purposes, but when Daniel evades her sexual advances and thwarts her plans, she escapes.

In the season 9 opener "Avalon", Vala seeks out Daniel at Stargate Command. Needing his linguistic skills, she uses a Kor mak bracelet to bind them together for a treasure hunt on Earth. The discovery of an Ancient communication device transports Vala's and Daniel's minds to a village in a distant galaxy where the local villagers kill Vala in a trial by fire, but a Prior, a servant of a race named the Ori, resurrects her. After Vala's and Daniel's safe return to Earth, the removed bracelets cause temporary after-effects that prolong Vala's stay at Stargate Command. In an attempt to stop the Ori from invading the galaxy in "Beachhead", Vala goes missing and appears to have died. Vala re-appears in the late season 9 episode "Crusade" and informs SG-1 via the communication device that she is in the Ori galaxy. The Ori had impregnated her against her will many months before, and Vala saw herself forced to marry a local villager named Tomin to make the pregnancy plausible. When Vala tells SG-1 about the Ori army approaching, the communication link is severed. Vala is last seen onboard one of the invading Ori battlecruisers in the closing scene of the season 9 finale "Camelot" when she goes into labor.

Season 10 opens with Vala giving birth to a female. The Ori call the rapidly growing child Orici, but Vala gives her the name Adria after her stepmother. Attempts to turn the child away from the Ori remain unsuccessful. Having escaped the Ori, Vala is allowed sanctuary at Stargate Command and joins SG-1 on several missions, during one of which she comes face-to-face with her fully-grown daughter. Vala's provisionary acceptance on Earth is only lifted in the eighth episode of the season, "Memento Mori", in which she is finally made a full member of SG-1. Vala meets Tomin again in "Line in the Sand" and tells him the true story behind the Ancients and Ori. A final showdown in the series between Vala and Adria occurs in "Dominion", which leaves Vala with the loss of her daughter. In "Unending", the last episode of the series, SG-1 gets stuck in a time dilation field aboard the Earth ship Odyssey, and a romance between Vala and Daniel finally comes to fruition. Before the time dilation field is reversed after fifty years, erasing all linked memories in the process, Daniel and Vala express their feelings for each other. The Ori story concludes with Adria's disempowerment and Vala's and Tomin's amicable separation in the 2008 direct-to-DVD film Stargate: The Ark of Truth. Vala and her alter ego, Qetesh, appear in the alternate-timeline film Stargate: Continuum.

=== Characterization ===
Official Stargate sources advertised Vala as a "scheming, unscrupulous, thieving con artist", "feisty" and "occasionally fickle", with a "mysterious agenda" and a seemingly "amorous interest in Dr. Daniel Jackson". Genre magazine TV Zone subtitled Vala as a "thief, arms dealer, mercenary" who, when given an inch, will "take a mile, and whatever else she can get her hands on." SFX described Vala as a "mischievous minx", whereas The San Diego Union-Tribune interpreted Vala as "ethically challenged". Steven Eramo of Starburst gave Vala the attributes "sexy, smart and always resourceful". Claudia Black characterized early Vala as "sassy", "intelligent", "manipulative", and "mercurial", but found it "very hard to tell what the real core of Vala is." Black later described Vala as "a new, weird element", "irritating", "very vibrant", "sort of the hair-pulling variety", "really infuriating" and "[hopefully] funny". With Vala being a departure from Black's former Farscape role as Aeryn Sun, Black regarded Vala as a comedic and energetic character with streaks of irreverence and naughtiness who "says everything that everyone else is thinking, but doesn't dare say", although both characters share "being damaged goods [in the beginning] and on a path to becoming a better person". Robert C. Cooper thought of Vala as "a bit of a wild card" and "a very sexy character, who isn't afraid to take whatever she wants in any given situation." Cooper and Black believed the character had a moral compass to her actions.

=== Relationships ===
Claudia Black and Michael Shanks (Daniel Jackson) linked their characters' early relationship to a Spencer Tracy/Katharine Hepburn dynamic of "not so much of tension, but rather constant antagonism". Despite the concern in early season 9 that their relationship would stagnate and dumb down their characters, Shanks felt Vala brought out a side of Daniel that he had not had the chance to play before, and Black advocated the slow revelation of Vala's layers of denial. The writers continued to develop the friendship between Vala and Daniel throughout season 10, aiming not to lose their sexual chemistry. Michael Shanks stated that by "Memento Mori", "Daniel legitimately cares about Vala and has seen some sort of redemption in her and wants that process to continue". From Black's point of view, Daniel offers "an interesting window" into "Vala's external façade to be playful with people". He helps Vala grow as a person and forces her to "develop coping mechanisms that allow her to be more adult and learn that it's ok to be honest and talk how you feel". Asked about a possible romance between Vala and Daniel before the filming of the series finale, Black predicted that a consummation of the relationship would end badly in terms of both story and on-screen chemistry. When producer Robert C. Cooper presented his preliminary script for the series finale, "Unending", both Black and Shanks protested his intended story of having Vala and Daniel sleep together without a confrontation. Shanks felt that "[t]here's always been this underlining, keeping [Vala] at arms length because of the fear of getting too close". After Cooper rewrote the scene to increase Vala's vulnerability to Daniel, and have Daniel truthfully explain his feelings of a relationship, the actors decided to play the confrontation scene as genuinely as possible, with both characters being neither completely in-character nor totally out-of-character.

Describing Vala's attitude towards bonding with other characters as "in a strange way quite level-headed" and "quite honest", Black interpreted Vala's behavior as a reaction to growing attached to people where the relationships never seem to work out. Cooper explained that by Vala's contacting of Stargate Command about the imminent threat at the end of season 9, she "has reached a point of honesty with [the SG-1] characters and possibly herself on a level that she's never had before". From the beginning of season 10, Claudia Black and Amanda Tapping requested a similarly positive camaraderie between their characters as male characters have. Tapping noted Carter's respect for Vala despite them being at opposite ends in their actions; Tapping also thought Carter finds Vala amusing instead of annoying. A scene in "Morpheus" that was intended to establish this relationship was cut for time; until the late season 10 episode "Family Ties" would accommodate this with a shopping scene, the actresses acknowledged their connection through looks and subtle nuances. By joining SG-1, Vala also shared a spot with stoic warrior Teal'c as the only alien members of the team, and actor Christopher Judge (Teal'c) explained that his character's amusement with Vala contributed to Teal'c's loosening up. The relationship between Vala and SG-1 team leader Colonel Cameron Mitchell (played by Ben Browder) was rarely emphasized in the series since Black and Browder were well known for formerly starring as star-crossed lovers in the cult sci-fi series Farscape.

According to Black; Vala's motivation to hide her miraculous pregnancy by marrying the local villager Tomin (played by Tim Guinee) in late season 9 stems from "genuinely car[ing] for the man. She does something wrong, but she must in order to survive". Against the audience's expectation, Vala and Tomin are shown as a seemingly functioning normal couple, and Vala makes several efforts to save him despite his deep indoctrination. Throughout season 10, Vala has to come to terms with her maternal feelings for Adria (as adult played by Morena Baccarin) well knowing from the beginning that Adria embodies a destructive entity that must be fought. Black believed Vala had to "try her best to connect with her daughter in the hope of finding ways to humanize her", despite her own lack of maturity. When Vala meets her father Jacek (Fred Willard) in "Family Ties", Vala shows "a slightly more dramatic and vulnerable side" that was new to the audience.

== Conceptual history ==
=== Creation and casting ===
Stargate SG-1 supervising producer Damian Kindler wrote "Prometheus Unbound" as a second-unit bottle episode for the middle of Stargate SG-1's season 8 in 2004. The main cast's availability was limited, as Richard Dean Anderson had a reduced season schedule, and Amanda Tapping and Christopher Judge filmed "Gemini" in parallel to "Prometheus Unbound". Kindler therefore centered the episode on Michael Shanks' character Daniel Jackson and created Vala, a human character from an unnamed planet, as Daniel's one-episode adversary. Not fully content with Kindler's conservative approach, producer Robert C. Cooper amplified the character's cheeky and sexy personality in his own passes of the script. Although Cooper tried to respect Stargate SG-1's reputation as a sex-free family show, he was aware that the character's flirtatiousness might cause a strong audience reaction.

Robert. C. Cooper suggested Australian actress Claudia Black for the role of Vala and contacted her agent two days before the filming of "Prometheus Unbound" began. The Stargate producers had approached Black several times before, but she had always been busy with other projects. At "Prometheus Unbound"'s casting stage, the actress had just finished dialogue looping sessions for Farscape: The Peacekeeper Wars in Australia. She thought the script of "Prometheus Unbound" was funny and self-contained enough for creative experiments, so she accepted the role and called the episode's director, Andy Mikita, in advance. He suggested an Out of Sight-kind chemistry for Vala and Daniel, and encouraged the actress to push the character as far as possible. On set, Claudia Black and Michael Shanks decided to make one of their first scenes, a fight sequence, as funny and non-machismo as possible to mirror Daniel's non-military background. In the meantime, Black tried to transform her day-long jetlag and lack of sleep into humour. When the producers saw the on-screen chemistry between Black and Shanks, they decided to make the character a bigger part of the show.

=== Development ===
With actor Richard Dean Anderson's departure from the show in 2005, Stargate SG-1 saw cast changes at the beginning of season 9. Ben Browder and Beau Bridges joined the main cast as Lieutenant-Colonel Cameron Mitchell and Major General Hank Landry, respectively. At the same time, the producers re-introduced Vala in a six-episode story arc to cover for the maternity leave of SG-1 regular Amanda Tapping (Lieutenant-Colonel Samantha Carter). The producer intended to use Vala's unpredictability and wildcard status to break the bigger story arc and to acquaint the audience with the new characters. Claudia Black wished to broaden her horizon in comedic acting and agreed to the recurring role, but declined the producers' offer of a permanent role for personal reasons.

Because Ben Browder and Claudia Black were well known for formerly starring as star-crossed lovers in the cult sci-fi series Farscape, the Stargate producers refrained from emphasizing the pairing of Mitchell and Vala beyond in-jokes. The producers instead opted to further the comedic chemistry between Claudia Black and Michael Shanks, who linked their characters' early relationship to a Spencer Tracy/Katharine Hepburn dynamic of "not so much of tension, but rather constant antagonism". Mirroring Vala's sexiness in season 8, "The Powers That Be" writer Martin Gero chose Qetesh, the Egyptian Goddess of Love and Beauty, as a fitting former Goa'uld identity for Vala. Nevertheless, Black and the producers refrained from portraying the character as too sexually manipulative. A scene from "The Ties That Bind", which was later cut for time, originally made clear that Wallace Shawn's character greatly exaggerated the sexual relationship between him and Vala. Claudia Black was brought back into the show for the last two episodes of season 9, at which time the actress was seven months pregnant. Producer Robert C. Cooper, who wrote and directed "Crusade", used the circumstances to set the stage for Adria, Vala's future daughter and the show's new villain in season 10.

Claudia Black joined the cast full-time in season 10. Had Stargate SG-1 not been picked up for a new season, the producers would have considered the character for a spin-off series. To justify the character in a regular capacity, the producers toned her down and tried to find a suitable balance of sexual tension, fun and friendship. Claudia Black was convinced that Vala's actual stay with Stargate Command was justified despite the character's personality. Vala's renegade qualification to infiltrate the Ori served as a useful complement to the military-oriented SG teams, and Vala had already proven a degree of allegiance through her actions in "Beachhead", holding off an immediate invasion of the enemy. The writers tested this loyalty through confrontation in the story, and writer Damian Kindler later compared Vala's character growth in season 10 to smuggler Lando Calrissian from Star Wars, a "former swindler who's gone legit". Careful to never have Vala become too earnest, Kindler never saw Vala "as the type of character who should be on the show for five, six, seven years. But definitely the sort of character who could come in for a couple of seasons, spice things up and then move on and come back and forth." Evolving the relationship between Vala and the other SG-1 members, the producers also grew comfortable with pairing Browder's and Black's characters more often, and even teased (and misled) viewers about them "end[ing] up in a motel room bed together" in the episode "Memento Mori", involving underwear, "handcuffs as well as creamy Twinkies". A scene in the milestone episode "200" also parodied the show's connection to Farscape. In hindsight, Claudia Black would see season 10 as a personal challenge as her baby deprived her of sleep during the filming period. Her relocation to Vancouver and sickness in the family put her on a self-confessed personal and professional low. She nevertheless tried to stay true to her character "and not go for the cheap laugh".

After a miscarriage scare during the filming of the first direct-to-DVD SG-1 film, Stargate: The Ark of Truth, Claudia Black's work on the film Stargate: Continuum was limited on strict doctor's orders. Although Black considered Continuum "not a Vala-centric piece" as she only "makes a brief appearance", Stargate producer Joseph Mallozzi thought "she's got some great, juicy scenes". Claudia Black mentioned an interest in portraying her character in the future, but Mallozzi rated the chances of her appearing in the planned Stargate Universe spin-off series as "not so good". Producer Brad Wright announced that Vala would not be returning for the announced third Stargate SG-1 direct-to-DVD film that was scheduled to be filmed in spring 2009. Claudia Black is the only SG-1 main cast member besides Corin Nemec (playing Jonas Quinn between SG-1's season 5 and 7) and Ben Browder (playing Cameron Mitchell from season 9 onward) who never appeared in Stargate Atlantis, although Vala is mentioned by Rodney McKay (played by David Hewlett) in the Atlantis season 5 episode "Identity".

=== Costumes and make-up ===
Claudia Black made her entrance in Stargate SG-1 in a full-body Kull Warrior costume, not dissimilar to her first appearance as a Peacekeeper in Farscape. For her entrance in season 9's "Avalon", however, the costume designers intended her to wear a dress that the producers later deemed too revealing. Leaving the dress for Vala's appearance as Qetesh in "The Powers That Be", Vala's outfit for "Avalon" was switched to a black fetish leather gear which a costume designer described as "a dominatrix outfit". Black admitted the wildness of her "Avalon" wardrobe was not for her liking. But since it mirrored the attention-seeking personality of the character, and because the character does not spend much time in the same outfit anyway, the actress did not mind wearing it.

Vala started wearing the normal SG team uniform in "Origin", the third episode of season 9. Claudia Black was later included in the design process and was given full control over her wardrobe for scenes that required civilian clothes. As such, Black chose Vala's underwear for the seduction scene in "The Ties That Bind" and her shopping tour outfit in "Family Ties". The latter episode also showed Vala with seven distinctly different hairstyles and outfits in total. Fearing the lack of seriousness, the producers opposed the make-up department's decision of having Vala wear curlers, but the scene could not be reshot. Similarly, a scene showing Vala unpacking her hair dryer and curling iron during an offworld mission in "The Quest" was deemed too silly and was trimmed to the basics; it would have been cut if the footage had allowed it. Due to Black's pregnancy during the filming of the films, the costume department needed to hide Black's bump with appropriate dressing.

== Reception ==
Vala action figure, based on her appearance in the episode "Avalon"

The character of Vala was immediately popular with the Stargate writers, producers and crew. During the filming of "Prometheus Unbound", people on set responded "very well" to the chemistry between Vala and Daniel. Director Andy Mikita called executive producer Robert C. Cooper during the first lunch break and told him to "hire this gal", and Cooper thought Vala/Black "was absolutely wonderful. The character really worked out." Writer Damian Kindler "really loved" what Black brought to the show, believing that "her character, when used properly, is just absolutely wonderful grist for the mill on SG-1." Stargate writer Martin Gero called Vala "so much fun to write, almost too fun. You do kind of get carried away." Michael Shanks repeatedly stated in interviews that Claudia Black revitalized his interest in acting.

While TV Guide called Vala a "saucy [and] bodacious babe who immediately clicked with viewers", GateWorld's Darren Sumner and TheScifiWorld's Gilles Nuytens commented on her "warm reception..by fans" and her being "an instant hit with fans of the show". 71 percent of over 8000 GateWorld readers rated Claudia Black's portrayal of Vala in season 9 as "perfect". In a later GateWorld poll among over 12000 participants, 51 percent answered that Claudia Black's joining the main cast was "about time!", while 22 percent were concerned or had no opinion. The actress was not as confident about the character's reception, and Robert C. Cooper advertised Vala's last season 9 appearance as the return of "a much loved and much hated character." Vala Mal Doran ranked second (25%) out of five behind SG-1's Cameron Mitchell (27%) in the viewer-voted 2006 Spacey Awards for "Favourite New TV Character", and was voted third (22%) out of five places in the 2007 Spacey Awards for "Favourite Character You Love to Hate" (26% Battlestar Galactica's Gaius Baltar, 28% Smallville's Lex Luthor). Per popular demand, Diamond Select Toys included Vala in their third series of Stargate action figures.

The Sun Herald thought of the character as "a thoroughly charming intergalactic thief famed for using her allure to get what she wants", and Matt Roush of TV Guide called Claudia Black "great fun to watch in [seasons 8 and 9]". TV Zone's Stephen Graves believed that Browder and Black's first post-Farscape encounter in Stargate SG-1's "Avalon" was "somewhat underplayed – but Black makes up for this with her sparky, snarky characterization of Vala." He welcomed the producers' decision to not cast a carbon copy of Samantha Carter, and thought that Claudia Black's Vala in her six-episode arc remained "the best thing in the series". By season 10's "Memento Mori", TV Zone's Anthony Brown felt that "Ben Browder and Claudia Black have...reached a point where they can play out an amusing take on Misery without you feeling that [their Farscape characters] have somehow starbursted onto SG-1's Earth". Maureen Ryan of The Chicago Tribune called Browder and Black's interaction in season 10 "great fun; the rapport they developed on the stellar Farscape was still much in evidence, even though they played radically different characters on SG-1."

Maureen Ryan described the chemistry between Black and Michael Shanks as "sparky" and "one of the most diverting parts of the latter seasons of the show". According to Ultimate DVD, the scenes between Vala and Daniel as the object of her affection resulted in "some of the freshest and funniest scenes in the show for some time". In reviewing "Unending", Anthony Brown called Vala "a character who's always had a little too much of comic relief [getting] torn apart by the nice guy of the team." SyFy Portal attributed Stargate SG-1 not going stale after ten years to Black, as she "quite literally steals the show from the existing cast of heroes". For her portrayal of Vala, Claudia Black was nominated for a Saturn Award in the category "Best Supporting Actress on Television" in 2006, and won a Constellation Award in the category "Best Female Performance in a 2006 Science Fiction Television" for the episode "Memento Mori" in 2007.
