= Cameron Mitchell (Stargate) =

Stargate character

- Ben Browder as Cameron Mitchell in a promotional photo for Stargate SG-1.
- First appearance: "Avalon Part 1" (SG-1)
- Last appearance: "Continuum"
- Portrayed by: Ben Browder (Original); Maximillian Uhrin (Young)

In-universe information
- Species: Human
- Occupation: United States Air Force; Lieutenant Colonel; Colonel
- Family: Frank Mitchell (stepfather); Wendy Mitchell (mother); Unnamed brother
- Nationality: American

Colonel Cameron "Cam" Mitchell, USAF is a fictional character in the 1997 American military science fiction television series Stargate SG-1, a science fiction show about a military team exploring the galaxy via a network of alien transportation devices. Played by Ben Browder, Cameron Mitchell is introduced as a main character in the season 9 premiere "Avalon", holding the military rank of lieutenant colonel in the United States Air Force. Learning of the SG-1 team's off-screen separation after the previous season, Mitchell is assigned as new commanding officer of SG-1, which he remains throughout season 10 (2006–2007) and the direct-to-DVD films Stargate: The Ark of Truth, ending at the rank of colonel for Stargate: Continuum (2008).

The first episodes of season 9 show Mitchell's struggle to reunite the former SG-1 members under his command. With the aid of Lt. Col. Samantha Carter, Dr. Daniel Jackson, the Jaffa Teal'c, and the alien thief Vala Mal Doran, Mitchell attempts to stop the Ori threat to the Milky Way galaxy during the series' run. Mitchell is an experienced fighter pilot and is often involved in close combat.

Despite Browder's popularity as former lead in the sci-fi TV series Farscape, Mitchell's role as the SG-1 leader attracted some viewers' resentment for taking over Carter's former position. Browder noted a lack of Mitchell-centric episodes and insufficient interaction between Mitchell and the other main characters. For his portrayal of Cameron Mitchell, Ben Browder was nominated for a Saturn Award in the category "Best Supporting Actor on Television" in 2006.

== Role in Stargate SG-1 ==
=== Character arc ===
Lieutenant Colonel Cameron Mitchell is the son of Frank and Wendy Mitchell, long-time residents of Auburn, Kansas. Mitchell occasionally mentions his Bible-thumping grandmother in comparison and contrast to the Ori religion. As shown in Stargate: Continuum, Mitchell's grandfather was the captain of the ship that transported the Alpha Gate from Egypt to the United States in the late 1930s.

Two episodes flash back to Mitchell's past. As revealed in "Collateral Damage", Mitchell's father was a test pilot for the United States Air Force and lost both legs in an accident when Mitchell was a child. When Cameron Mitchell was a USAF Captain, he piloted an F-16 over the Middle Eastern desert and mistakenly bombed a vehicle containing innocent refugees rather than the enemy. The season 9 premiere "Avalon" flashes back to Lieutenant Colonel Mitchell during the events over Antarctica in season 7's "Lost City". Mitchell led a squadron of F-302 fighters against the forces of the arch villain Anubis and was shot down, resulting in severe injuries. During his recovery in the hospital, he received the Medal of Honor and was promised any assignment by Brigadier General Jack O'Neill. Mitchell began reading all mission reports that the SG-1 team had filed.

In his first appearance in the season 9 premiere "Avalon", Mitchell has fully recovered and opts to join SG-1. When he learns that the original team has moved on to new assignments, he becomes the new SG-1 leader but fails to assemble a new team. After the alien Vala Mal Doran arrives on Earth, Dr. Daniel Jackson and the alien Teal'c assist Mitchell for a treasure hunt on Earth that eventually sets off the Ori arc. Mitchell takes his place at the head of this provisional team rather reluctantly. Lieutenant Colonel Samantha Carter temporarily joins Mitchell's team in season 9's sixth episode, "Beachhead", which ends with Vala's disappearance. Mitchell officially reunites the former SG-1 team one episode later in "Ex Deus Machina". Vala reappears in late season 9 and officially joins SG-1 under Mitchell's command in season 10's "Memento Mori". Mitchell continues to lead SG-1 in Stargate: The Ark of Truth and is promoted to colonel before his appearance in Stargate: Continuum (where the credits mistakenly list him as "Lieutenant Colonel").

=== Characterization ===
At the beginning of season 9, Mitchell's main motivation is to get the SG-1 team back together. Producer Robert C. Cooper wanted Cameron Mitchell to mirror the Stargate fandom and be a "super fan" of SG-1 and a "Stargate geek", who is enthusiastic about exploring the galaxy. Nevertheless, Browder described Mitchell as a "stoic" character who "actually follows military protocol"; the character has "a certain naïvety and innocence, even though he is neither particularly naïve or innocent". Mitchell's personality and attitude depends on his location (on-base and off-world) and the people around him. With Mitchell's team demeanor becoming subtler in season 10, Browder felt that the writers "finally figured out Mitchell's only superpower is getting beat up and bleeding".

Browder considered Mitchell to be more restrained than his former Farscape character John Crichton, who had higher emotional stakes and was "literally going insane through the process of the series. Mitchell's focus was on his job, and on the fun of his job. But Crichton's focus was on survival, and on the creation of a family." Crichton was also the center of the Farscape narrative, whereas the SG-1 characters serve as nearly equal parts in an ensemble show. Browder did not view Mitchell as a substitute for Richard Dean Anderson's role of Colonel Jack O'Neill, the undisputed SG-1 team leader from seasons 1 through 7. While O'Neill's approach was "normally couched in sarcastic terms" in later years, Mitchell is "more optimistic and has a wry sense about him that's not so much sarcastic".

=== Awards and decorations ===

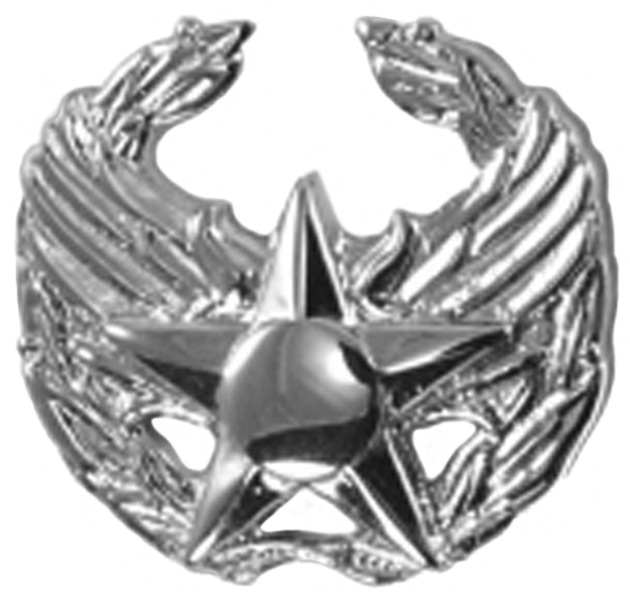

Badge	Command Pilot Badge		
1st Row	Distinguished Flying Cross	Purple Heart	Meritorious Service Medal w/ 3 oak leaf clusters
2nd Row	Air Medal w/ 3 oak leaf clusters	Aerial Achievement Medal	Air and Space Commendation Medal w/ 1 oak leaf cluster
3rd Row	Air and Space Achievement Medal	Air and Space Outstanding Unit Award	National Defense Service Medal
4th Row	Armed Forces Expeditionary Medal	Global War on Terrorism Expeditionary Medal	Global War on Terrorism Service Medal
5th Row	Air Force Overseas Short Tour Service Ribbon	Air and Space Longevity Service Award w/ 3 oak leaf clusters	Air and Space Training Ribbon
Badge	Air Force Commander's Insignia		

=== Relationships ===
Mitchell maintains a level of decorum around General Landry (Beau Bridges), but is more laid-back around the SG-1 members. Michael Shanks (Daniel Jackson) and Browder did not want to repeat the "cliché[d]" original O'Neill-Daniel dynamic where views on military and diplomacy clash. The actors tried to find some commonality between the characters while trying to develop an entertaining rapport between them. By mid-season 9, their interaction had become playful, without being decidedly positive or antagonistic. Although Mitchell and Teal'c (Christopher Judge) are both warriors and leaders, Teal'c is taken aback by Mitchell's enthusiasm at first, as he is more used to O'Neill's reserved attitude. Teal'c is unsure if he likes Mitchell, but Mitchell forces Teal'c to interact with him. By not letting Teal'c step back and observe, Mitchell makes Teal'c an active part of the scene.

Because Ben Browder and Claudia Black (Vala Mal Doran) were well known for formerly starring as star-crossed lovers in Farscape, the Stargate producers refrained from emphasizing the pairing of Mitchell and Vala beyond in-jokes. The producers instead opted to further the comedic chemistry between Claudia Black and Michael Shanks. When Vala's relationship with the SG-1 team members evolved in season 10, the producers grew comfortable with pairing Browder's and Black's characters more often, and even teased (and misled) viewers about them "end[ing] up in a motel room bed together" in the episode "Memento Mori", involving underwear, "handcuffs as well as creamy Twinkies". A scene in the milestone episode "200" also parodied the show's connection to Farscape.

Amanda Tapping (Samantha Carter) found that the introduction of the Ori threat inhibited major character and relationship development in season 9. The characters are of equal rank, and regard each other with respect according to producer Joseph Mallozzi. They give each other fair weight in decision-making, and Mitchell defers to Carter on all science-related issues. Tapping's favorite Mitchell-Carter scenes were some "neat sibling-type moments" in "Arthur's Mantle", and moments showing their history and friendship in "Line in the Sand", "The Road Not Taken", and Stargate: The Ark of Truth. Browder regretted after season 10 that he had not worked enough with the cast besides Tapping, and that "the fans probably feel that way as well".

Several episodes hint at Mitchell's love life. The early episodes of season 9 suggest a relationship between Mitchell and Landry's daughter, Dr. Carolyn Lam (Lexa Doig); a scripted romantic subplot in "Avalon" was filmed but was cut for time when the two-parter ran long for over twenty minutes. In season 9's "Collateral Damage", Mitchell has a romantic encounter with a female human researcher from another planet, named Reya Varrick but she is killed. At his 20-year high school reunion in "Bounty", Mitchell lays the foundation for a relationship with his high school crush, Amy Vanderburg.

=== SG-1 leadership ===
Mitchell was conceived as the leader of SG-1 who brings the team back together. Following negative fan reactions to Carter's cancelled leadership within the team (she commanded SG-1 throughout season 8), Browder noted the production difficulties that came with Amanda Tapping's maternity leave, and claimed that new leaders are brought in routinely into units in military reality. Tapping admitted to also have been "kind of put off" upon learning that someone else would lead SG-1, and hoped that the producers would make SG-1 more of an ensemble team in season 10 by removing the patriarchal line of command. The writers decided after an animated discussion after the initial season 9 episodes that Mitchell and Carter should co-command the team, although they left Mitchell in the official leadership position.

Whereas Mitchell can hardly cope with leading the team in season 9, Mitchell is more comfortable with his leadership position in Stargate: The Ark of Truth. Browder described Mitchell's early leadership difficulties as "dealing with what are essentially legendary characters within the mythology of the show"; ordering them around would ring false or as hubris from both an audience- and storytelling perspective. Tapping eventually considered the question of leadership irrelevant; Mitchell cannot give orders to his team since he and Carter hold the same military rank, and Daniel and Teal'c are not members of the United States military. Mitchell thus plays more to the strength of the team, choosing a leadership style that is comparable to elite teams like Delta units, where everyone participates to the fullest of their abilities and defers to the specialist quickly when needed.

== Conceptual history ==
=== Conception ===
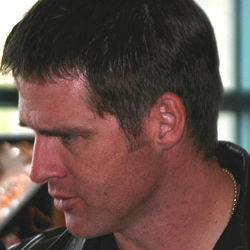
Ben Browder at a Farscape convention in 2004, a year before being cast as Cameron Mitchell on SG-1

The producers had discussed casting Ben Browder as a possible Major John Sheppard and Colonel Dillon Everett for the first season of Stargate Atlantis. Browder was still filming Farscape at that time, but had met several Stargate producers on sci-fi conventions. With Richard Dean Anderson's (Jack O'Neill) departure from Stargate SG-1 after season 8 (2005), Ben Browder and the Stargate producers got together as soon as the introduction of new main characters was discussed. Browder's character was codenamed "M.M." until the producers settled on the name "Cameron 'Cam' Mitchell", with the aviator call sign "Shaft", a pun on camshaft.

Also joining the main cast in season 9 was Beau Bridges as General Hank Landry. The alien Vala Mal Doran (played by Browder's former Farscape co-star Claudia Black) was re-introduced for a six-episode story arc to cover for the maternity leave of SG-1 regular Amanda Tapping (Lieutenant-Colonel Samantha Carter). Since the producers had not realized the physical resemblance between Browder and Michael Shanks (Daniel Jackson) when Browder was cast, Shanks grew a beard that he would sport in the first six episodes of season 9; the characters would also often wear differently-colored Battle Dress Uniforms. Vala's line in "Avalon" that Earth seems to have a "limited gene pool" refers to the actors' similar looks.

Having sporadically watched episodes of SG-1 over the years, Browder watched the first previous seasons of SG-1 in two and a half weeks to catch up with the show, which the writers would turn into a recurring in-joke that Mitchell had read every SG-1 mission report before joining the SG-1 team. Browder relocated to Vancouver, British Columbia, Canada, where Stargate SG-1 was being filmed. His family, who had been with him in Australia during his Farscape years, stayed in Los Angeles, although Browder's children would appear as background characters in "The Ties That Bind" during their set visit.

=== Development ===
Browder put the character's direction into the hands of the writers but thought that the audience would define Mitchell through the character's actions and words and not by his backstory in the end. He wanted to humanize the character without letting him be entirely dictated by military terms, while turning him slowly into as much a hero as the other SG-1 team members already are. Producer Robert C. Cooper, who wrote Mitchell's introduction in the first three episodes of season 9, wanted Mitchell to be enthusiastic about exploring the galaxy from the beginning. Mitchell should be a "super fan" of SG-1 and a "Stargate geek", mirroring the Stargate fandom. Browder did not want the character's first on-screen reaction to be enthusiasm, so the character was written to be stoic and guarded around General Landry in the first scenes. Cooper incorporated Mitchell into a flashback to a memorable SG-1 scene from season 7's "Lost City" to avoid a contrived heroic action by Mitchell in the season 9 opener.

Although Mitchell was the leading man, most episodes in the first half of season 9 do not particularly focus on Mitchell. Several writers, who had been used to Anderson's reduced filming schedule in past seasons, subconsciously diminished Mitchell's role until Cooper reminded them of Browder's full-season contract. Although Mitchell had a more prominent role in the season 10 episodes "Uninvited", "Company of Thieves", and "Bounty", Browder noted the lack of Mitchell-centric episodes in season 10. Producer Joseph Mallozzi explained this as the result of having to service the Ori arc and Vala as the new main character. Mitchell also did not appear in any Stargate Atlantis episodes, which Browder explained with the lack of history between Mitchell and Atlantis; for instance, Daniel possesses Ancient knowledge, and Carter shares a history with the Atlantis character Rodney McKay (David Hewlett). Having penned two Farscape episodes, Browder did not pitch possible SG-1 storylines to the producers until season 10. Browder received story credit for his basic pitch for season 10's "Bad Guys", which Stargate Atlantis producer/writer Martin Gero developed into a teleplay.

=== Stunt work and on-screen violence ===
Mitchell is often at the center of the action and fight sequences. Browder joked for years that "Mitchell's super power is getting his ass whipped", which was the opposite of the powerful warrior Teal'c. Browder enjoyed the physicality of the role and wanted to do many of his own stunts. Browder had acquired first fight experiences in drama school, and had done much stunt work on Farscape. Browder worked with fight choreographers in seasons 9 and 10 of Stargate SG-1. Browder's first fight sequence on SG-1 was a sword fight with a knight in "Avalon", where Browder did not have a stunt double and used real swords because heavy swords look more real in action. This fight was followed by an elaborate fight to the death with a Sodan Jaffa warrior in "Babylon". Although writer Paul Mullie was concerned that fans might be put off by the violence and darkness of "Collateral Damage", where Mitchell has memories of beating a love interest to death, the producers did not want to shortchange Mitchell's emotional journey and chose to not shy away from violence in the episode. Browder played another sword fight in "Camelot", and was involved in an extended hand-to-hand combat with a Replicator-possessed IOA member James Marrick (played by Currie Graham) in The Ark of Truth.

== Reception ==
Although TV Zone's Stephen Graves believed that Ben Browder and Claudia Black's first post-Farscape encounter in "Avalon" was "somewhat underplayed", he considered Mitchell's introduction entertaining, with Mitchell's "excruciating" interviews with potential new recruits as "a particular highlight". However, Graves was disappointed that Mitchell did not contribute much to the story after the knight fight, and that Mitchell's "frantic" efforts to get the old SG-1 team back together hinted too much at the production team's efforts to turn around the season 8 finale. While some fans were upset that Carter did not resume command of the SG-1 team after her return, Leonard Fischer of The Seattle Times considered Browder and Michael Shanks to have developed "some fun on-screen rapport" by the middle of season 9.

By season 10's "Memento Mori", TV Zone's Anthony Brown felt that "Ben Browder and Claudia Black have [...] reached a point where they can play out an amusing take on Misery without you feeling that [their Farscape characters] have somehow starbursted onto SG-1's Earth". Maureen Ryan of The Chicago Tribune called Browder and Black's interaction in season 10 "great fun; the rapport they developed on the stellar Farscape was still much in evidence, even though they played radically different characters on SG-1."

For his portrayal of Cameron Mitchell, Ben Browder was nominated for a Saturn Award in the category "Best Supporting Actor on Television" in 2006. Per popular demand, Diamond Select Toys included Mitchell in their third series of Stargate action figures.
