= Joel Goldsmith =

American composer (1957–2012)

- Born: Joel King Goldsmith; November 19, 1957; Los Angeles, California, U.S.
- Genres: Film score; contemporary classical music
- Occupations: Composer; conductor
- Website: freeclyde.com

Joel King Goldsmith (November 19, 1957 – April 29, 2012) was an American composer of film, television, and video game music.

== Biography ==
Joel Goldsmith was born on November 19, 1957, in Los Angeles, California, the third of four children of Sharon (née Hennagin), a singer, and renowned composer Jerry Goldsmith. He was of Jewish descent. Goldsmith's maternal uncle was composer and professor Michael Hennagin.

He was the main composer for the TV series Stargate SG-1, although the main titles were written by David Arnold (who composed the score to Stargate, the film that began the Stargate franchise). For Stargate Atlantis, Goldsmith composed the main titles and the score. He also composed the main title theme and score for the second season of the CBS series Martial Law.

During his career, he usually collaborated with two composers; his father Jerry Goldsmith, and Neal Acree. He made his first move into video games music in 2006, scoring Call of Duty 3. During his final years, Goldsmith relocated to Hidden Hills, California, where he built a home studio in his back yard.

Goldsmith died of cancer on April 29, 2012, aged 54, at his home in Hidden Hills, California. His interment was at Forest Lawn - Hollywood Hills Cemetery.

== Emmy Award nominations ==
- Outstanding Music Composition for a Series (Dramatic Underscore) – Stargate SG-1 (1998)
- Outstanding Main Title Theme Music – Stargate Atlantis (2005)
- Outstanding Music Composition for a Series (Original Dramatic Score) – Stargate Atlantis (2006)

== Credits ==
Year(s)	Title	Type	Notes
1977	End of the World	film	
1978	Laserblast	film	Collaborated with Richard Band
1983	The Man with Two Brains	film/comedy	
1989	Ricky 1	parody	Parody of the Rocky films
1989	The Rift	film	also known as La Grieta
1990	Moon 44	film	
1991	Brotherhood of the Gun	film	
1992	A Woman, Her Men, and Her Futon	film	
1992	Maniac Cop III: Badge of Silence	film	
1993	Joshua Tree	film	
1993	Man's Best Friend	film	
1993–1994	The Untouchables	TV series	
1994–1995	Hawkeye	TV series	
1996	Star Trek: First Contact	film	Joel Goldsmith collaborated with his father Jerry Goldsmith on this film
1996	One Good Turn	film	
1997	Kull the Conqueror	film	
1997–2007	Stargate SG-1	TV series	
1988	Counterforce	film	
1998	Diagnosis Murder	TV series	Joel re-orchestrated the Dick DeBenedictis theme and scored episodes
1999	Diamonds	film	
1999	Martial Law	TV series	Joel wrote the new main title theme and scored episodes
2000	At Any Cost	TV film	
2001–2002	Witchblade	TV series	
2003	Helen of Troy	TV miniseries	
2004–2009	Stargate Atlantis	TV series	
2006	Call of Duty 3	video game	
2007–10	Sanctuary	TV series	Composed the main title that was used in the first two seasons
2008	Stargate: The Ark of Truth	direct-to-video	The first of two direct-to-video Stargate films
2008	Stargate: Continuum	direct-to-video	
2009–2011	Stargate Universe	TV series	
2011/2012	War of the Dead	film	
2012	Echoes	pilot, un-aired	2012 Will Waring un-aired pilot; final known score
