= Ori (Stargate) =

Fictional characters in the science fiction television series, Stargate SG-1

The Ori /ˈɔːraɪ/ are fictional characters in the science fiction television series Stargate SG-1. Within the storyline, there are fictional beings described as "ascended" because of their use of advanced technology and knowledge of the universe. The Ori are an example of such beings. A significant part of the storyline in the ninth season of Stargate SG-1 involves the Ori's attempt to trick humans into worshipping them as gods.

The Ori first appeared in the ninth season of the series Stargate SG-1, replacing the Goa'uld as the TV series's primary antagonists. While the Goa'uld relied solely on stolen technology from other civilizations to pose as gods, the Ori were conceived as having paranormal abilities in addition to advanced technology. As ascended beings, they live on a higher plane of existence with great power and knowledge and are as close to being "gods" as any non-deific being can be. The Ori fabricated a religion called Origin, which they use in an attempt to control non-ascended beings. Those who reject Origin risk getting their civilization–or even their planet–wiped out by the Ori.

== Concept and creation ==
=== Genesis ===
Since the eighth season of Stargate SG-1 was intended to be the last, the producers finished it with the defeat of the Goa'uld and Replicators. When the Sci Fi Channel renewed the series, however, the producers had grown tired of writing creative endings. Having had good experiences with the first season of Stargate Atlantis, they decided to revamp the series by introducing new villains and missions. Thus they considered the beginning of Season 9 as the pilot of a new show.

Season Nine was about wiping the slate clean and resetting the story to where Stargate SG-1 was in its first season. The reason was that the SG-1 team was now winning every time, having already defeated the main enemies the previous season. Since SG-1 had always been grounded in Earth mythology, the producers chose the legend of King Arthur for the new season. Merlin, as a famous magical figure, became an Ancient, leading to the Ancients' enemies named the Ori. The Ori are thus "a natural extension of where the Ancient mythology had gone." Up until that point, the story of the Ancients had been kept at arm's length because the show was not about the aliens but "human beings going out into this unexplored, fantastical universe." The producers also stated that a premature full revelation of the Ancients would have caused their story to be less interesting.

Producer Brad Wright believed the Ori were still within the overriding theme of Stargate, as they are "aliens playing gods" in their relationship with ordinary human folk. The introduction of the Ori was to prepare the viewer for their invasion that would occur later in the show. The Ori also served as a challenge for the new heroes in the SG-1 team (Mitchell, Landry, Vala). The writers believed that new bad guys and new obstacles for the characters to overcome would make for a more interesting story.

The name "Ori" comes from the word "origin," as in the origin of the Ancients. When executive producer Robert C. Cooper looked at the root of "origin," he retcon-invented the word "Origin" as the name of the Ori religion. Cooper said it was an interesting idea for him to address the philosophical arguments with various religious people, seeing the whole challenge as "how do you prove whose God exists or whether God exists at all?" Unlike the Goa'uld, who were quickly proven to not be gods after killing them and figuring out their technology, it would be hard to present the same argument to the Ori followers because the Ori were essentially ascended gods. Even if their gods were dead, it would not make much difference to them, as their followers would continue to believe; without the "magic powers" of the Ori, their followers and the Priors (the Ori's missionaries) could still use the technology and their ships. Cooper said that "it's not necessarily wrong to believe in something [...] what's wrong is to murder somebody because they don't believe the way you do." Although Cooper was reluctant to get too serious about the meaning behind the Ori as Stargate should "first and foremost [...] entertain people," he considered it representative of television and the media "mak[ing] people believe whatever the people in charge of that magic box–whatever they want you to believe–they can pretty much convince you, or convince the vast majority of people." For Cooper, "the followers of the Ori were the interesting part," and he "wanted to do a story that was in some way reflective of the differences between people's beliefs that we see around us in our society, and how conflicts arise as a result of that." Cooper was particularly interested in the interaction between Ori followers and other normal human beings and the resulting "mysterious aspect and quality to religious belief and the passion that it invokes." The producers therefore inserted the Ori into the story's background, similar to the way there was very little direct interaction between the actual deities of the religion and mankind in real life.

Cooper was concerned that the distinction between the Ori and their followers was often overlooked, and that the SG-1 team dealt with the followers, not the ascended gods. If, as "The Shroud" suggested, the Ori were actually destroyed by the Merlin's Ancient weapon, the real issue for the SG-1 teams became the followers. Brad Wright pointed to power corruption, the catch of the Ori killing unbelievers.

=== Story ideas ===
In the original pitch for "Beachhead," Brad Wright had intended to let the Ori build and come through the Supergate. It was then decided among the writers to only let the threat of the Ori come through the Priors, and to postpone the actual arrival of the Ori until the end of the season.

The last ten minutes of "Camelot" should serve as a "great, ominous harbinger of the foe" SG-1 is up against. In Season 10, the Ori sweep through the Milky Way galaxy, forcing SG-1 to start from scratch again in finding technology, resources, and allies to fight against them.

If Stargate SG-1 had continued, the producers would have considered the search for the Ark (of Stargate: The Ark of Truth) as the overriding story for the eleventh season, similar to the Sangraal in seasons nine and ten. The producers did not explore more detailed ideas after the show's cancellation.

=== Design ===
Art director James Robbins designed the Ori and the Priors from scratch. At the beginning, he knew a basic description of them and their powers, and that their weapon of choice would look like a staff. The art department looked at Samurai to design their costumes. Inspired by the rituals of remote jungle tribes, Robbins came up with the idea of scarification for the Priors and the Doci (a chief Prior who acts as a mediator or mouthpiece for the Ori). The Priors have scarifications on the chin and the cheek; the Doci have the same scarifications as the Priors with added ones on their foreheads. Scarification would therefore be a symbol of high establishment. Originally, it was also considered for the Priors to have scarification on the hands, along with finger extensions, but this was deemed impracticable. When the Prime Jaffa (a subspecies of humans enslaved by the Goa'Uld) Gerak became a Prior in "The Fourth Horseman," the golden Jaffa tattoo on his forehead was replaced with a Prior scarification, and his makeup was made to look like the gold had melted and become part of the new mark.

Each Prior was given his own unique symbol, which he would wear on his wardrobe and also on his staff weapon. The art department built each staff to have a little orb encased in natural wood, which glows when the actor pushes a little button on the handle.

=== Music ===
Composer Joel Goldsmith's inspiration for the Ori themes had "certain parallels to what's happening today, in modern day." He admits that the music of the Ori was intentionally given a Gothic, Gregorian and Christian feel. He tried to meld a few different styles.

== Mythology of the Ori and the Ancients ==
The Ori backstory is elaborate. It is explained throughout Seasons 9 and 10 and in the film Stargate: The Ark of Truth. Robert C. Cooper considered the backstory "pretty complicated" but felt the show gave the answers to the audience members who wanted to delve deeper.

Part of this story returns to the Ancients, whose backstory began in the Season 1 episode "The Torment of Tantalus." Early in Season 9, Brad Wright explained that the Ori are the original Ancients, who would disagree with the Alterans (later to relocate and be known as the Ancients of the Milky Way galaxy) that they shouldn't interfere because interference would mean playing god, which these beings hadn't quite achieved.

The Ori and the Alterans were one race millions of years ago and lived in a single society on an evolutionary path to ascension. The Ark of Truth shows flashbacks to human Ancients coexisting with the people who eventually became the Ori. However, a philosophical division emerged. The Ori grew more and more fervent in their religious belief, while the Alterans adopted a more scientific/rational outlook to become a more progressive society. The Ancients were well known for their fierce belief in free will and had a code to be "fairly non-violent." As such, they do not interfere on lower planes of existence at all, not even to save their own kind from being exterminated by the Ori, or to prevent all life in the Milky Way galaxy from being exterminated by Anubis. In contrast, the Ori constantly interfere. For example, Origin states that failure to share the secrets of the universe with those on the lower planes of existence is an evil act and that anyone not following it must be eliminated; by this definition, every ascended Ancient was evil and must be destroyed. They also have no rules against taking direct control of living beings or completely changing the living beings to behave as the Ori desire. With the Ori outnumbering the Alterans, their viewpoints ultimately diverged so much that the two groups split apart and began to actively oppose each other, with the Ori attempting to kill the Alterans.

Their fundamentally different beliefs in regards to science led the Alterans to hide their level of scientific belief so that they would not get into a conflict. Eventually, the Ancients decided to build a spaceship and leave rather than to use their technology, like the Ark of Truth, to defeat the Ori. Though they had the ability to stop the Ori, they thought it to be philosophically and morally wrong. The film thus addresses the non-interference policy of the Ancients under the Ori threat, and how they act millions of years later, when SG-1 succeeds in killing the Ori.

After much time, believed by Daniel Jackson to be thousands of years, the Alterans discovered the Milky Way, where they eventually seeded life and built their empire. However, even after the Ori had forced the Alterans to leave their galaxy, the two factions remained bitter enemies. Eventually, the Alterans were afflicted with a terrible plague that wiped out most of their civilization and forced them to relocate again. It would later be discovered that what was known of this plague is very similar to the disease used by Priors against non-believers, which had led Daniel Jackson to speculate that the pre-ascended Ori might have been responsible for this plague.

After millions of years, both the Alterans and the Ori learned how to ascend and evolved, forming two groups that continued to oppose each other, even at the higher planes of existence. According to the Orici Adria, the Ori-Ancient war on the Ascended plane is due to the Ancients' intolerance for those who do not comply with their rules about non-interference. According to Orlin, a de-ascended Ancient, the conflict arises from the Ori's ultimate wish to destroy the Ancients once and for all as they seek to eliminate all who oppose them.

When the Ori ascended, they re-created humanity (the second generation of humans) to worship them in the Ori galaxy, and gave their followers the knowledge and technology to essentially enslave others and to force them to believe as the Ori desired. The Ancients shielded the humans in the Milky Way, preventing the Ori from finding out about and enslaving them to "Origin," as they had in their own galaxy. The Ancients do not view this action as a violation of their non-interference policies, as the Ori are at a level equal to themselves. However, as the Ancients will not interfere in the lower planes of existence, the Ori are allowed to send their human followers to the Milky Way in order to convert it, and anyone who wishes to worship the Ori will not be prevented from doing so.

According to Orlin, ascended beings can be empowered by massive numbers of humans worshipping them. The Ori fabricated an entire "Origin" religion, based on the false promise of ascension in order to take power from their human followers. The Ancients refrain from interfering in the lower planes of existence because manipulating and aligning lower life forms could result in exactly this type of corruption. According to the Ancient Myrddin, the Ori had the best intentions when they began. Even after the Ori were destroyed, their followers and Priors continued acting in their name to oppress thousands of people since, for the most part, they were ignorant to the demise of their "gods."

== Characteristics ==
The Ori impose a religion called Origin on sentient beings, promising a guide towards enlightenment that is also known in the series as Ascension. The faith comes with a holy book called The Book of Origin, and the Priors spread the Word of Origin. The Book of Origin contains tales of how the followers of the Ori returned to the path of enlightenment and achieved Ascension, although some skeptics consider these merely "fables meant to fill a soul bereft of hope with purpose." Several lines from the Book of Origin, or otherwise repeated mantras, are heard on the show. These include variations of "Hallowed are the Ori." The central icon of this religion is fire because it is something that gives off light and warmth. The fact that on Earth fire has some evil or Satanic associations in many modern religions prompted Daniel to posit that the Ancients had influenced this negative connotation in order to identify the threat the Ori pose. Among the populations of natives in the Ori home galaxy are groups of heretics who believe they are being suppressed, and seek to discover forbidden historical knowledge to show others that the Ori, despite their power, are not gods.

Ori military tactics varied during the initial incursions into the Milky Way galaxy and the full-scale invasion that was later achieved through the Supergate. The initial incursions were achieved through lone Priors who were sent to worlds in the Milky Way galaxy, preaching to the populace and distributing copies of the Book of Origin. When the people failed to comply, more drastic measures were taken, eventually to the point of destroying the population. The show features powerful Ori weapons in "Ethon," ships in "Camelot," control chairs like that in "Counterstrike" and Supergates in "Beachhead." The Ori can be killed by Merlin's Sangraal weapon, which nullifies ascended beings. As seen in The Ark of Truth, there is also an Ark that Cooper considered "a truly fascinating centerpiece" and "mass brain-washing device" which causes people to see the truth in any given situation. Comparing the Ark to television as it is "a box that light comes out of, and you believe what it says," Cooper left it open whether the choice to do it without guns was ultimately the better method.

== Characters ==
=== Doci ===
The Doci (middle) amidst two Priors in the episode "Origin"

The Doci (Latin docere, "to teach"), played by Julian Sands, represents the Ori in their home galaxy and leads the Priors. He appears in "Origin," "The Fourth Horseman, Part 1" and Stargate: The Ark of Truth. The Doci is essentially a chief Prior who acts as a mediator or mouthpiece for the Ori. The Doci has brown hair and colored eyes, pale skin and facial markings of a Prior. The Doci was introduced in "Origin," where he was shown to reside in the city of Celestis, with his chambers next to the Ori's Flames of Enlightenment. In one instance, the Ori possessed the Doci to speak to Daniel. Had Julian Sands not been able to come back as the Doci for the direct-to-DVD film The Ark of Truth, the producers had planned to hire another actor as a different Doci in charge in Celestis. Although Sands' availability eventually was a hindrance in The Ark of Truth, the producers felt it was better to include the Doci than to completely forego the character.

=== Priors ===
The Ori are served by so-called Priors, highly evolved human beings who act as missionaries of the Ori by traveling to different planets to spread the religion of Origin. As the Ori are incapable of directly affecting the material universe in the Milky Way Galaxy due to the protection of the ascended Ancients, they send the Priors as their representatives to circumvent this rule. Cooper said the Priors have "these incredible, superhuman powers," which allow them to perform deeds which they convince people are miracles, attack enemies, and resurrect the dead. They also unleash plagues as punishment for not following the Ori. The Priors believe fervently in their mission, and essentially offer a real religion with big promises. Priors have been encountered on various worlds, trying to convert the local population and fight anyone who tried to stop them, including the Tau'ri and the Jaffa.

As shown in the series, priors are normal humans whom the Ori transform into an evolved state of human to serve as missionaries as a reward for loyalty and devoted service. This process drastically alters their appearance: albino skin and hair, a tracery of raised lines on the chin and cheeks, and indentation of the skull just above and behind the eyes. Their eyes appear as a misty gray pupil without an iris. In "The Fourth Horseman" and The Ark of Truth, SG-1 was able to temporarily disable a Prior's abilities by using ultrasonic sounds to deny Priors access to the advanced areas of their brains.

- Damaris (played by William B. Davis) is a Prior who makes contact with the Sodan in "Babylon." SG-1 challenges him in "The Fourth Horseman," where Damaris is killed in self-defense.
- Daniel Jackson (played by Michael Shanks) is turned into a Prior by Adria in "The Shroud" as part of her plan to convert the Tau'ri to the path of Origin. However, because Merlin had previously downloaded his memories into him, Daniel is able to maintain his own personality and, after exploiting his Prior powers to finish constructing and activating the Sangraal, reverts to his normal form.
- Gerak (played by Louis Gossett Jr.) is a Jaffa introduced in "Origin" who, after becoming interested in the promised path of ascension, turns into a Prior in "The Fourth Horseman." He dies later on in the same episode after turning against Origin. Daniel Jackson speculated that the Ori had included a kill switch when they transformed him into a Prior, to prevent disloyalty.
- Prior #1 (played by Mark Houghton) visits the village of Ver Eger and revives Vala after her Trial of Fire in "Avalon." He then brings Vala and Daniel to the Doci in the city of Celestis and back to the village to find more heretics in "Origin."
- Prior #2 (played by Larry Cedar) is the first Prior to be sent to the Milky Way after the Ori learns of the existence of humans in this galaxy. Cameron Mitchell brings him to Stargate Command in "Origin," where the Prior eventually bursts into flames after learning that he would never again leave the planet.
- Prior #3 (played by Greg Anderson) is the governor of the village of Ver Eger and is introduced in "Avalon" when Daniel and Vala first came to the village. As a reward for doing his duties and putting Vala through a Trial by Fire, he is transformed into a Prior in "Origin." He is later sent to the Milky Way and makes appearances in "The Powers That Be" (unleashing a plague in a defiant village), in "The Fourth Horseman" (turning Gerak into a Prior), and in "Line in the Sand" (ordering the destruction of a village by spaceship). He also appears in Stargate: The Ark of Truth, in which he is killed.
- Prior #4 (played by Ian Butcher) tries to convert the people of Kallana in "Beachhead" and later transforms the planet into a micro black hole to power a Supergate.
- Prior #5 (played by Morris Chapdelaine) visits the Sodan homeworld in "Arthur's Mantle" and causes Volnek to turn on his fellow Jaffa and kill them.
- Prior #6 (played by Doug Abrahams) is a Prior introduced in "Crusade" who visits Ver Isca and cures Tomin of his limp, also informing him that he is unable to father children. Prior #6 is on board one of the Ori battlecruisers invading the Milky Way in "Camelot" and is present during Adria's birth in "Flesh and Blood" and informs her parents of her divine purpose. He also appears in "The Quest," accompanying Adria in the search of the Sangraal. He made an appearance in Stargate: The Ark of Truth.
- Prior #7 (played by Peter Nicholas Smyth) accompanies Adria in "Counterstrike" and is killed in an attack by the Jaffa with the Dakara Superweapon.

=== Tomin and the Ori warriors ===
Tomin and some Ori warriors in Stargate: The Ark of Truth

The Ori warriors are conscripted men, who were trained to fight non-believers as foot soldiers and take over the Milky Way. Introduced in "Crusade," they are shown wearing metallic plate armor and armed with powerful staff weapons. They are first seen in combat in Season 10. Cooper wrote "Crusade" with the intention to show that the Ori warriors are not two-dimensional, even though their strength of belief and single-mindedness makes them fight for what they want to fight for. According to Cooper, the Ori warriors are a fictional mirror of the events in the real world, but he wanted people to try and understand "why people want to go to war with us, or blow up our buildings, or our airplanes." Cooper also wanted to show that "there's really no winner to the argument" when it comes to "religion and belief, and gods;" according to Cooper, there is a line when a society takes up arms instead of finding a more civilized way of dialogue.

Tim Guinee played Tomin, a devout Ori follower of the village of Ver Isca, who becomes an Ori commander in Season 10. He appears in "Crusade," "Flesh and Blood," "Line in the Sand," and Stargate: The Ark of Truth. Tomin is intended as a representation of the Ori warriors, and Cooper described Guinee as a "fabulous actor who instantly creates that humanity and empathy ... while he's mass-murdering people." Tomin is introduced in flashbacks in "Crusade," having found Vala after she was transported to the Ori home galaxy. Tomin had been crippled since childhood, and was therefore looked down on by his fellow villagers. Tomin married Vala and accepted her pregnancy as his child, not knowing that it was a miraculous conception set by the Ori. A little later, a Prior visited the village and cured Tomin of his limp, allowing him to become a warrior for the Ori. The prior also told Tomin the truth about the child as "the will of the Ori," who would later be the Orici. Tomin is later able to forgive Vala. Tomin and Vala depart aboard the first wave of Ori vessels entering the Milky Way, and they go separate ways in "Flesh and Blood". Tomin rises to the rank of commander within the Ori warrior armies, and he and Vala meet again in "Line in the Sand." Because a Prior twists the words of the Book of Origin, Tomin begins to doubt the Priors and their interpretations of Origin's teachings, and helps Vala escape. Tomin plays an important role in the film Stargate: The Ark of Truth, in which, after seeing a Prior's death with his own eyes, he learns the truth about the Ori.

=== Adria the Orici ===
In Season 10, the primary antagonist switched from the Priors and the Doci to the Orici, also known by the name Adria. The story presents her as a genetically advanced human infused with Ori knowledge, created to circumvent the Ancients' rules that the Ori cannot directly use their powers to conquer the Milky Way galaxy. Adria is one step higher than the Doci, but equal in terms of her role in the Milky Way galaxy, which is to lead the armies of the Ori in the Milky Way galaxy, converting the galaxy to Origin in the process. Adria possesses several Prior-like superhuman abilities, and leads the armies of the Ori until her Ascension in the penultimate episode of Stargate SG-1. From a creative standpoint, Adria's character was created to give Vala Mal Doran a story and personality arc as a member of the SG-1 team.

Adria's story begins shortly after the events of "Beachhead," when Vala is impregnated by the Ori in the Ori home galaxy. Vala eventually returns to the Milky Way aboard one of the Ori battlecruisers invading the Milky Way galaxy. In "Flesh and Blood," Vala gives birth to a baby girl, the Orici. Within hours of being born, the child reaches the apparent age of four and heals her mother's pain, knowing that Vala is not a believer in Origin. By the child's apparent age of seven, Vala gives her the name Adria, after her stepmother, a "witch of a woman." Vala escapes when Adria is at the apparent age of twelve. Adria only starts to have an impact in the second quarter of the season, when she has grown "into a beautiful but deadly young woman."

When Vala, who has joined the SG-1 team, meets adult Adria in "Counterstrike," Adria foreshadows her plans with Daniel. In "The Quest," Adria tricks SG-1 into obtaining the Sangraal for her. Adria captures Daniel before he can complete the device. Hoping to convert both Earth and Vala, Adria attempts to convert Daniel to the path of Origin and makes him a Prior. In "The Shroud," however, Daniel betrays her and uses the weapon on the Ori galaxy. In "Dominion," Adria is briefly implanted with a cloned Ba'al symbiote. Although the symbiote is removed, the procedure almost kills Adria and she ascends. Being the only surviving Ori after the events of "The Shroud," Adria alone controls the power generated by the followers of Origin–becoming the closest thing the Stargate universe has seen to a true god. She continues the Ori's assault on the Milky Way in Stargate: The Ark of Truth. After an Ancient device known as the Ark of Truth affects her galaxy's believers, Adria is last seen in Stargate: The Ark of Truth in a battle with the Ancient Morgan le Fay, which in Cooper's view started as a fight in the human realm of existence and continues on the ascended level similar to what happened with Anubis and Oma Desala in "Threads." Adria is thus "eternally distracted from being able to continue her evil ways."

Young Adria was played by three child actresses–Adria at age four was played by Robert C. Cooper's daughter Emma, who replaced the originally cast child who suffered from stage fright. Adria at age seven was played by Jodelle Ferland, and at age twelve by Brenna O'Brien. Morena Baccarin was offered the role of adult Adria in a phone call by the producers, who were Firefly fans. The orange contact lenses that the actress had to wear made her feel nearly blind and irritated her eyes, so the lenses were dropped during the shooting of "The Quest." Baccarin enjoyed "the whole experience [...] incredible" as she got to play a character she could learn from. In her words, "Adria was a complex character and I loved trying to make her sweet as well as totally bad." Brad Wright called Adria "an interesting character because she's the Ori cheating," and compared her to the Ori equivalent of a Harcesis. Cooper considered Adria becoming host to a Goa'uld "the marriage of the old villains and the new villains" and compared it to the episode "Enemies," the first where both the Replicators and the Goa'uld first appeared together. Morena Baccarin was only available for one day during the filming of Stargate: The Ark of Truth, worth six pages of script. Cooper had written more scenes between her, Julian Sands ("Doci") and the SG-1 team, but the only other option to what ended up in the film was to cut the character.

=== Anti-Ori underground ===
In the second episode of season 9, it is shown that not all humans in the Ori home galaxy believe their gods to be benevolent, as is seen in the case of the Anti-Ori Underground. This group of humans live a dangerous life in hiding from purges and the fanatical followers. Their purpose is simply to collect enough evidence to prove to their brethren that the claims of the Ori are false. Despite this, they do believe that the Ori are very powerful; it is only their intentions they doubt. Even though the group lives in the shadows of Ori society, they have collected a number of artifacts that they have kept hidden, since such pieces of technology contradict the book of Origin and thus would be destroyed if discovered. The group also has a number of followers in high positions even within the City of the Gods. All known members of this movement–Harrid (played by Stephen Park), Sallis (April Amber Telek), Fannis (Paul Moniz de Sa), Seevis (Michael Ironside), and Denya (Daniella Evangelista)–die shortly after their introduction. Another member is introduced in Stargate: The Ark of Truth: Hertis (Chris Gauthier). Tomin somehow finds him and takes him to meet with Daniel and Vala in order to find the location of Ortus Malum where the team believes the Ark of Truth to be. He is somewhat suspicious of Daniel and Vala as they are unaware that the fires of Celestis are out (an indication that the Ori are dead) which should have spread very far. Apparently, Tomin told him they were from far away but just not how far (another galaxy). In order to give him proof of their story, Daniel, Vala and Tomin take him to the Odyssey which is in orbit. He tells them what is believed to be the location: a mountain high above the Plains of Celestis on another planet. Presumably he is then returned to his home planet as he is not seen again.

== Reception ==
In reviewing the first part of Season 9, Steven Graves of TV Zone was concerned that "mining Arthurian mythology for season 9 may prove to be a mistake for Stargate," comparing scenes of "Avalon" to "a god-awful Merri Olde England pastiche straight out of Monty Python and the Holy Grail, complete with unwashed peons, an overbearing church and witch-burning." He however commented about "Origin" that "Stargate SG-1 seems to be establishing an interesting set of themes this season, providing a timely commentary on religious evangelism and intolerance with its new villains, the Ori." By "The Powers That Be," Graves was sure that "the Ori are a force to be reckoned with." Regarding "The Fourth Horseman," he thought it was "doubly nice" to see an SG-1 story where the apocalyptic events have an effect on contemporary Earth instead of on alien planets.
