= Stargate SG-1 season 10 =

Season of television series

Stargate SG-1
- Season 10
- DVD cover
- Starring: Ben Browder; Amanda Tapping; Christopher Judge; Claudia Black; Beau Bridges; Michael Shanks
- No. of episodes: 20

Release
- Original network: Syfy
- Original release: July 14, 2006 – March 13, 2007

Season chronology
- ← Previous; Season 9

The tenth and final season of Stargate SG-1, an American-Canadian television series, began airing on July 14, 2006, on Sci Fi Channel (United States). It concluded after 20 episodes on March 13, 2007, on Sky 1, which overtook the Sci-Fi Channel in mid-season. The series was developed by Brad Wright and Jonathan Glassner. Brad Wright, Robert C. Cooper, Joseph Mallozzi, and Paul Mullie served as executive producers. Season ten regular cast members include Ben Browder, Amanda Tapping, Christopher Judge, Claudia Black, Beau Bridges, and Michael Shanks.

The season (and the Ori arc of the show) is continued with direct-to-DVD film Stargate: The Ark of Truth.

== Reception ==
Will O'Brien of TV Squad thought "Company of Thieves" was, for the most part, a good one, despite a disappointing performance by Rudolf Martin. Jason Van Horn of IGN, however, was less than impressed, suggesting that the episode just wasn't interesting – that the Lucian Alliance was an enemy no one cares about and that Paul Emerson wasn't enough of a character within the show for his death to have had any meaningful impact.

The tenth and final season of Stargate SG-1 was nominated for a Saturn Award in the category "Best Syndicated/Cable Television Series". For his portrayal of Moros in "The Quest, Part 2", Matthew Walker was nominated for a Leo Award in the category "Best Supporting Performance by a Male in a Dramatic Series". The episode "200" was nominated for a Hugo Award in the category "Best Dramatic Presentation – Short Form".

== Main cast ==
- Starring Ben Browder as Lt. Colonel Cameron Mitchell
- Amanda Tapping as Lt. Colonel Samantha Carter
- Christopher Judge as Teal'c
- Claudia Black as Vala Mal Doran
- With Beau Bridges as Major General Hank Landry
- And Michael Shanks as Dr. Daniel Jackson

== Episodes ==
No. overall	No. in season	Title	Directed by	Written by	Original release date
195	1	"Flesh and Blood"	William Waring	Robert C. Cooper	July 14, 2006
Following their devastating attack on Milky Way forces, the Ori leave the scene to begin their holy war to purify the galaxy of evil. As the remnants of the makeshift Milky Way fleet come together, Vala gives birth to a baby girl, the Orici, genetically altered by the Ori to command their forces. Daniel Jackson has escaped to the Ori flagship, which has just arrived on Chulak to convert the Jaffa into believing in Origin. He pretends to be an Ori warrior while he and Vala attempt to kidnap the Orici, who has been named Adria by Vala. An attempt by SG-1 and Bra'tac to destroy the fleet over Chulak fails and Bra'tac sets a collision course with one of the ships in a futile attempt to destroy it while Daniel is captured by Tomin, Vala's husband. He escapes and knocks out both Adria and Tomin, but is disarmed by a Prior and trapped with Vala in a wall of fire with no way out. In the nick of time, the Odyssey arrives and beams SG-1 off their ship and Daniel out of the Ori warship. As Daniel beams out, he manages to grab Vala and take her with him, but leaves Adria behind.
196	2	"Morpheus"	Andy Mikita	Joseph Mallozzi & Paul Mullie	July 21, 2006
Questing for the Sangraal, the team ends up in a mess of trouble when they are struck with a sleeping sickness on Vagonbrei (aka Verus Gen Bree), one of the three planets where the weapon is supposed to be located. Meanwhile, Landry must decide whether or not Vala can be trusted to remain at the SGC as a possible future member of SG-1, but it might not be up to him when the IOA steps in. Teal'c discovers a lizard (a chuckwalla) immune to the parasite causing the sleeping sickness, and a cure is reverse engineered from it. Vala is accepted as a provisional member of the SGC, though she is not allowed to join SG-1 officially yet.
197	3	"The Pegasus Project"	William Waring	Brad Wright	July 28, 2006
SG-1 visits Atlantis with two goals: to find new clues about the location of Merlin's superweapon, the Sangraal and to disable the Supergate by connecting it to a black hole in the hope that they can stop the Ori from sending more ships through. As Dr. Rodney McKay (David Hewlett), Chief Science Officer of the Expedition assists Carter and Mitchell in their elaborate plan to "jump" a wormhole by sending a bomb directly into the Supergate using the Odyssey. Daniel, Vala and Dr. Elizabeth Weir, the head of the Expedition, search the city's databases for information, eventually confronting the Ancient known as Morgan Le Fey. She shows them the address of the two planets they must search but when she tries to tell them something important, she is pulled away by the other Ancients. At the same time, the Odyssey succeeds in its mission, destroying both a Wraith Hive Ship and an Ori warship, in the SGC's greatest victory to date against the Ori.
198	4	"Insiders"	Peter F. Woeste	Alan McCullough	August 4, 2006
When an Al'kesh crashes only a few miles away from Cheyenne Mountain, the team finds Ba'al, and he asks them to capture his rebellious clones; in exchange, he offers information about the whereabouts of Merlin's weapon. As the clones are brought in for questioning, SG-1 must determine which Ba'al is the real one. Eventually the Ba'als take over the SGC in order to get the SGC's list of Stargate addresses, which includes addresses known only to the Ancients, in order to find Merlin's weapon. The Ba'als get the addresses and beam out to a ship in orbit while SG-1 realize Ba'al brainwashed Agent Malcolm Barrett to help him escape.
199	5	"Uninvited"	William Waring	Damian Kindler	August 11, 2006
The team discovers several creatures that only appear on worlds where the SGC has used the Sodan cloaking devices. Things get worse when another creature appears in the woods on Earth where Mitchell and Landry are spending some "quality time" at O'Neill's cabin. Coming together, SG-1 and Landry kill the creature and another one that appears and close off the area even though they're sure they got them all. With the creatures dead, the team and Landry relax together at the cabin.
200	6	"200"	Martin Wood	Brad Wright & Robert C. Cooper & Joseph Mallozzi & Paul Mullie & Carl Binder & Martin Gero & Alan McCullough	August 18, 2006
Martin Lloyd contacts the SGC, looking for their assistance in writing a feature movie to follow up Wormhole X-Treme!, presenting some of the team's most creative fantasies. It also marks Colonel Mitchell's 200th time through the event horizon, and is the 200th episode in the series. In the end, SG-1 go on what is alleged to be a routine mission and are joined by Generals Landry and O'Neill and Sergeant Walter Harriman. While the Wormhole X-treme movie is cancelled, the series is renewed and survives ten more years.
201	7	"Counterstrike"	Andy Mikita	Joseph Mallozzi & Paul Mullie	August 25, 2006
Deadly battles erupt between the Ori, led by Adria, and the Jaffa, after 100,000 villagers are wiped out by a powerful energy wave which Adria believes was SG-1's doing. She captures Daniel and Vala and uses her powers against them to determine the nature of the weapon. Learning about the Dakara superweapon, she heads there to destroy it. SG-1 gets rescued by the Odyssey, but Dakara and its weapon are destroyed, fracturing the Free Jaffa Nation.
202	8	"Memento Mori"	Peter DeLuise	Joseph Mallozzi & Paul Mullie	September 8, 2006
During a dinner out, Vala is captured by the Goa'uld Athena, who attempts to pry memories out of Vala's subconscious from her time as a host. When things go wrong, Vala develops amnesia, runs away, and must begin to piece herself back together as a waitress. SG-1 eventually catches up to her. She tries to run again, but Daniel manages to get her to remember him at least. She returns to the SGC where she recovers her entire memory and finally achieves her dream of becoming a fully-fledged member of SG-1.
203	9	"Company of Thieves"	William Waring	Alan McCullough	September 15, 2006
After the Odyssey is attacked and hijacked by the Lucian Alliance, Mitchell must infiltrate the organization to save his friends from being caught in the crossfire in a deadly Lucian Alliance civil war, but the situation may quickly go awry. Eventually Vala and Daniel manage to retake the Odyssey and thanks to Mitchell's efforts, are able to get enough time to repair the hyperdrive and escape after beaming Mitchell and Teal'c aboard. Earth is now officially at war with the Lucian Alliance. But the mission is overwhelmed by the murder of Colonel Paul Emerson.
204	10	"The Quest"	Andy Mikita	Joseph Mallozzi & Paul Mullie	September 22, 2006
205	11	"The Quest"	Andy Mikita	Joseph Mallozzi & Paul Mullie	January 9, 2007 (Sky One); April 13, 2007 (Sci Fi)
Part 1: SG-1 follows a dream that Vala has and searches a planet whose address is made up of the three addresses where Arthur and his knights searched for Merlin's weapon. On the planet, they discover that Ba'al is also there and are forced to work with him and Adria to locate the weapon with each group having differing objectives. Together the group passes a series of tests left by Morgan Le Fay, but are confronted by a dragon.... Part 2: After defeating the dragon, SG-1 and Ba'al are transported to a series of planets where they discover a laboratory and Merlin in stasis. Realizing that the anti-Ori weapon has been destroyed but that Merlin can rebuild it, the team wakes him and he agrees to build a new weapon but dies before he can finish. Daniel downloads Merlin's consciousness and continues building the weapon while Carter and Ba'al work on fixing the Stargate so they can escape. Before Daniel can finish the weapon, Adria, who was left behind, arrives with her forces to stop them. Daniel takes out the soldiers with Merlin's powers and holds Adria off so the rest of SG-1 can escape, but Daniel is captured by Adria and Ba'al is killed.
206	12	"Line in the Sand"	Peter DeLuise	Alan McCullough	January 16, 2007 (Sky One); April 20, 2007 (Sci Fi)
In an attempt to utilize Merlin's phase shifting technology, SG-1 answers the cry of a village pressured by Origin, and they attempt to phase shift the entire area. The plan appears to have been successful, until the device fails, and the Ori forces begin their onslaught. Meanwhile, Tomin, ordered to convert Vala to Origin, begins to question his faith in the religion when his views on the Ori's teachings clash with those of the Prior leading the assault, who's using the teachings to justify his actions. In the end, Mitchell and a seriously injured Carter manage to bring the entire village out of phase using the power source of an Ori staff weapon, making it seem like the Ori have destroyed it. Tomin helps Vala escape even though he knows it may cost him his life.
207	13	"The Road Not Taken"	Andy Mikita	Alan McCullough	January 23, 2007 (Sky One); April 27, 2007 (Sci Fi)
Carter experiments with Arthur's Mantle even further, but her studies send her to an alternate universe where the Ori are only hours away from obliterating the planet and the Stargate Program has been made public, resulting in martial law being spread across the U.S. In order to return home, Carter must help, but when things finally seem to go her way, President Landry won't allow Carter to return. Carter succeeds in saving the alternate Earth by shifting it out of phase and eventually convinces Landry to let her go by telling him about his counterpart from her world. Carter returns after two weeks absence with the help of Rodney McKay (David Hewlett) and is amused to discover that her team has spent that time talking to an empty room. However, there is still no sign of Daniel.
208	14	"The Shroud"	Andy Mikita	Story by : Robert C. Cooper & Brad Wright; Teleplay by : Robert C. Cooper	January 30, 2007 (Sky One); May 4, 2007 (Sci Fi)
When SG-1 discovers a village tempted by Origin without any threats of destruction, they're in for a huge shock when they find out that their own teammate, Daniel Jackson, has been turned into a Prior of the Ori. The team captures Daniel who reveals that he and Merlin have been plotting the destruction of the Ori and need their help to finish the job. The team and O'Neill are skeptical as Daniel's plan calls for reopening the Supergate which would let through more Ori ships, but decide to do the plan themselves while Daniel is put into stasis. Frustrated, Daniel breaks free, hijacks the Odyssey and kidnaps O'Neill. Daniel and O'Neill arrive to find that Adria and her forces have captured SG-1, but Daniel is able to overpower Adria. With Daniel in command of the Ori ship, O'Neill shuts down the Supergate and Daniel flies the ship through as Vala finishes and activates Merlin's weapon. At the last moment, O'Neill beams the team off the ship, but Adria is left behind. Due to Merlin's modifications to his body, Daniel reverts to his normal self with Merlin gone as well, but it is unclear if the Ori are dead or not. Also, six new Ori warships come through the reopened Supergate.
209	15	"Bounty"	Peter DeLuise	Teleplay by : Damian Kindler; Excerpts written by : Robert C. Cooper and Ron Wilkerson	February 6, 2007 (Sky One); May 11, 2007 (Sci Fi)
After SG-1 destroys a Lucian Alliance shipment of kassa (a crop containing a highly addictive stimulant) near the planet Rolan, the Lucian Alliance places a bounty on all of the members of the team, threatening national security and lives. Meanwhile, Mitchell returns to his hometown for a high school reunion, accompanied by Vala... and bounty hunters hot on their trail. SG-1 manage to dispatch most of the bounty hunters and convince the last to go after Netan, the leader of Lucian Alliance and he apparently kills him.
210	16	"Bad Guys"	Peter DeLuise	Story by : Ben Browder & Martin Gero; Teleplay by : Martin Gero	February 13, 2007 (Sky One); May 18, 2007 (Sci Fi)
Searching for a great treasure, the team gates to a planet where they discover that the DHD is a prop in an exhibit; in turn, when they ask for help they appear to have come out of nowhere. Now SG-1 is mistaken for hostage-taking rebels, and they are forced to play the part in order to survive. Things degenerate as the team tries to hold off the authorities long enough for Stargate Command to make contact and send them a power source capable of dialing the Stargate, but Vala discovers a naquadah bomb, which she is able to use to power the Stargate. As the team tries to return to Earth, they are apprehended by the authorities, but Mitchell is able to convince them to let SG-1 go. However, the people of the planet apparently bury the Stargate afterwards.
211	17	"Talion"	Andy Mikita	Damian Kindler	February 20, 2007 (Sky One); June 1, 2007 (Sci Fi)
A former foe of Teal'c's has turned to the way of Origin and bombed a Jaffa summit on a Jaffa world named Dar Eshkalon attempting to rekindle the council. The aftermath appears to have killed many Jaffa, and leaves Bra'tac hanging on to his life. Enraged at what has happened and seeking revenge, Teal'c now decides to go on a single-minded quest... and it seems that not even SG-1's actions can stop him from achieving his goal. Teal'c ultimately tracks down his old foe and finally kills him, despite being seriously injured in the process.
212	18	"Family Ties"	Peter DeLuise	Joseph Mallozzi & Paul Mullie	February 27, 2007 (Sky One); June 8, 2007 (Sci Fi)
Vala's father, Jacek, makes a deal with the SGC for sanctuary in exchange for helping stop an attack on Earth. As Jacek attempts to repair his relationship with Vala, General Landry is inspired to reach out to his daughter, Dr Lam, and his ex-wife. With Jacek's information, SG-1 and the Odyssey are able to track down and destroy a fleet of ships poised to bomb Earth, but discover Jacek double-dealing to steal the naquadah on one of the ships already on Earth. SG-1 outcon Jacek and capture the ship while Jacek flees in a fake and peddles off the styrofoam peanuts left on the ship instead of naquadah.
213	19	"Dominion"	William Waring	Story by : Alex Levine; Teleplay by : Alan McCullough	March 6, 2007 (Sky One); June 15, 2007 (Sci Fi)
In an attempt to capture Adria, the team uses Vala as bait, only to have Ba'al beam the Orici away in SG-1's time of victory. When they track down the parasite, they discover Ba'al wants to end the reign of the Ori just as much as the SGC, and he's taken a drastic course of action to do so, implanting Adria with one of his cloned symbiotes. The symbiote is ultimately removed and eventually killed, but Ba'al fatally poisons Adria beforehand and in order to survive she ascends.
214	20	"Unending"	Robert C. Cooper	Robert C. Cooper	March 13, 2007 (Sky One); June 22, 2007 (Sci Fi)
The Asgard summon SG-1 to tell them that their experiments to halt their genetic degeneration have failed, meaning they are a dying race. Because of this, the Asgard have decided to give "everything [they] have and know" to the Tau'ri. Thor tells Colonel Carter that the people of Earth are the fifth race, the other four being the Ancients, Nox, Furlings, and the Asgard. When the Ori show up, the Asgard destroy Orilla, and themselves with it, so that their technology will not fall into the hands of the Ori. With the new weapons the Asgard equipped the Odyssey with, they are able to destroy an Ori mothership with ease, but come under repeated assault from two more who chase them wherever they go. In a desperate attempt to stop the relentless pursuit, SG-1 and General Landry beam the crew off the ship onto an uninhabited planet and lock the ship in a time-dilation field when they are unable to separate the new upgrades from the hyperdrive. They end up spending between fifty to sixty years trapped on the ship, moments away from death if they ever stop the field. During that time, Landry dies and Daniel and Vala get together. As an old woman, Carter figures out how to reverse time so this never happens, but unless someone stays old, everything will happen the same way. It also requires temporarily allowing the ship to be destroyed to allow an energy blast to power the effect. Due to his greater lifespan, Teal'c volunteers and is able to give Carter what she needs to separate the hyperdrive quickly, and the Odyssey escapes.

== Home releases ==
DVD name	Region 1	Region 2	Region 4
Stargate SG-1 Season 10	July 24, 2007	December 3, 2007	August 23, 2007
Volume 50 (1001–1004)	—	August 13, 2007	—
Volume 51 (1005–1006)	—	September 10, 2007	—
Volume 52 (1007–1012)	—	October 15, 2007	—
Volume 53 (1013–1016)	—	November 5, 2007	—
Volume 54 (1017–1020)	—		—
