= Teal'c =

Fictional character in "Stargate"

Teal'c of Chulak
- Christopher Judge as Teal'c in a promotional photo for Stargate SG-1 Season 9.
- First appearance: "Children of the Gods" (SG-1)
- Last appearance: "Midway" (Atlantis)
- Portrayed by: Christopher Judge

In-universe information
- Species: Jaffa
- Title: First Prime; Chief Master Sergeant - United States Air Force (honorary rank)
- Occupation: Former First Prime to Apophis, Serves at Stargate Command (the SGC); member of SG-1
- Family: Ronac (father, deceased), Drey'auc (wife, deceased), Rya'c (son), Kar'yn (daughter-in-law)

Teal'c of Chulak /ˈtiːəlk/ is a fictional character in the 1997 military science fiction television series Stargate SG-1. Portrayed by Christopher Judge, Teal'c is a Jaffa warrior from the planet Chulak. As a Jaffa, Teal'c is a genetically modified human with an abdominal pouch that serves as an incubator for a larval Goa'uld. The larval symbiote grants enhanced strength, health, healing, and longevity; Teal'c is around 100 years old during the show's run and ages an additional 50 years in the final SG-1 episode. Teal'c's most notable feature is a golden tattoo found on his forehead, a sign that he once served the System Lord Apophis as First Prime, the most senior Jaffa rank.

Teal'c is introduced in the pilot episode of Stargate SG-1, "Children of the Gods". The character appears in all episodes of SG-1 except season 8's "Prometheus Unbound", making him the character with the most episode appearances. Teal'c also appears in the direct-to-DVD films Stargate: The Ark of Truth and Stargate: Continuum, as well as the Stargate Atlantis season 4 episodes "Reunion" and "Midway". In 2002, Christopher Judge was nominated for a Saturn Award in the category "Best Supporting Actor in a Television Series".

== Role in Stargate ==
=== Character arc ===
Teal'c is a Jaffa from the planet Chulak. In the decades before the events of Stargate SG-1, the Goa'uld System Lord Cronus executed Teal'c's father (Cronus' First Prime, the most senior Jaffa rank) for retreating during a battle that could not be won. In the hopes of avenging his father's death one day, Teal'c joined the armies of the rival System Lord Apophis. Under the direction of Apophis' then-First Prime, Bra'tac, Teal'c learned the ways of a warrior and rose in the ranks to become Apophis's new First Prime. His interaction with Bra'tac and his own personal experiences eventually led Teal'c to doubt the divinity of the Goa'uld.

When the SG-1 team is captured on Chulak in the pilot episode of Stargate SG-1, Teal'c defects from Apophis and joins the SG-1 team. He believes this will provide an opportunity eventually to defeat the Goa'uld and bring freedom to all Jaffa. Teal'c finds a home at Stargate Command (SGC) on Earth and occasionally visits his wife Drey'auc and his young son Rya'c on Chulak (see section Relationships). SG-1 joins forces with Bra'tac in many missions against Apophis in the next four seasons. Teal'c's integrity in the team is tested after he kills Daniel's wife Sha're in season 3's "Forever in a Day" to stop her torturing Daniel. After SG-1 succeeds in killing Apophis in the season 5 premiere, "Enemies", Chulak becomes a free planet.

The first major group of Jaffa Resistance warriors is shown in season 5's "The Warrior". By season six, Teal'c and Bra'tac have become prominent leaders of the Jaffa Resistance. Earth's Alpha site serves as a main site of operation for the Rebel Jaffa and later the Tok'ra, but the two races have difficulty with trust and collaboration in defeating the Goa'uld as their enemy. Teal'c and Bra'tac lose their symbiotes after a sabotaged Rebel Jaffa summit in season 6's "The Changeling", but the Tok'ra drug Tretonin sustains them from then on. Tretonin eventually becomes instrumental in liberating Jaffa from physiological reliance on Goa'uld symbiotes. No longer presenting a security risk to Earth, Teal'c attempts to have a normal life and moves out of the SGC in season 8's "Affinity". However, Teal'c's alien behavior and a murder case make life difficult for him.

Teal'c and Bra'tac eventually lead the Jaffa to victory over the Goa'uld in season 8's "Reckoning"/"Threads". The Goa'uld have long weakened one another by continuous civil war amongst the System Lords, and the Jaffa see the Goa'uld's inability to save themselves from the Replicators as proof that they are false Gods. The new Jaffa Nation immediately becomes a major power, inheriting part of the fleets of the System Lords. Teal'c and Bra'tac are knighted Bloodkin to all Jaffa, the highest honour that can be bestowed on any Jaffa. The planet Dakara serves as the nation's new capital, and Chulak becomes a major stronghold for the Free Jaffa Nation in season 9.

Teal'c is chosen as a member of the new Jaffa High Council, but the nation is divided between the opposition progressives (including Teal'c and Bra'tac) with a vision of a representative democracy, and the ruling traditionalists who support the military oligarchy. Many of the councilors are the former leaders of the Jaffa Resistance, and initially resist the Ori religion after having worshiped false gods for too long. After the death of the traditionalist leader Gerak in season 9's "The Fourth Horseman", Teal'c supports Bra'tac as an interim leader before the nation adopts a constitution based on Earth representative democracies in "Stronghold". After the events of season 9's "Camelot", the Ori take control of Chulak. The Jaffa suffer greatly against the Ori forces, and Dakara is completely destroyed. The last Jaffa episode is season 10's "Talion", in which Teal'c kills the Jaffa leader of an Ori-devout group named Arkad. The fate of the Jaffa Nation and Teal'c's standing among the Jaffa remain unresolved at the end of the series. In the series finale, "Unending", Teal'c spends fifty years frozen in time on the Odyssey with the rest of SG-1 when Carter triggers a time dilation device to prevent them being destroyed by an Ori battlecruiser, but when she finds a way to escape and save the Odyssey that requires one person to go back to the moment before time froze, Teal'c volunteers as his Jaffa nature meant that aging fifty years wouldn't be as significant to him as it would be to his human colleagues. As a result, Teal'c is the only one who remembers what took place during the time dilation device, but he vowed to never share that information with others, and apart from having gained a white streak in his hair his physical potential remains relatively unaffected.

Teal'c appears in the direct-to-DVD films Stargate: The Ark of Truth and Stargate: Continuum. He also appears in two episodes of Stargate Atlantis, set before the events of Continuum. In "Reunion", he wishes Colonel Carter farewell before she leaves to become the new leader of Atlantis. In "Midway", he comes to Atlantis at Carter's request to teach Satedan warrior Ronon Dex how to deal with IOA interviews. While there, they develop a friendly rivalry, culminating in an hour-long sparring match which ended in a draw. When the Wraith leave the Pegasus galaxy and set foot at the SGC, Teal'c and Ronon work together to stop the enemy.

=== Characterization ===
Teal'c is a Jaffa from the planet Chulak, a planet orbiting a binary star system. Jaffa have a human appearance but have an abdominal pouch which serves as an incubator for a larval Goa'uld. The larval symbiote grants enhanced strength, health, healing, and longevity. Teal'c states he is 101 years old in season 4's "The Light", and ages an additional 50 years in season 10's "Unending". But since the symbiote also replaces the Jaffa's immune system, its removal is known to cause a long and painful death. As a Jaffa, Teal'c does not require sleep, but must voluntarily engage in a form of meditation called kel'no'reem in order to synchronize with his symbiote. However, he later had his symbiote removed and survived on a drug called tretonin. After this, he was weaker, could no longer perform kel'no'reem and needed sleep.

Teal'c is a "stalwart alien with the unfathomable – and mostly silent – demeanor" and "the most straight-faced member of SG-1". Teal'c's catchphrase is "Indeed". Christopher Judge described Teal'c as a liberator who tries to end his people's enslavement. Although Teal'c has certain well developed physical abilities and talents, he is very much human in his heart and in his mind. Judge also described Teal'c as a "rebel in a society that doesn't tolerate rebels". Teal'c is all about honor. By season 7, Teal'c has become more vocal about expressing his feelings towards situations and other characters. Teal'c became more accustomed to life on Earth, developed a taste for doughnuts and has gone on fishing trips with O'Neill, though he is puzzled as to why O'Neill fishes in a lake known to be devoid of fish. His favorite movie is Star Wars; he has seen it 9 times as of the season 5 episode Ascension. He once stated a dislike for "bovine lactose", which may be due to an earlier episode ("Unnatural Selection"), in which Teal'c is seen gorging himself on ice cream and even stealing O'Neill's pint of ice cream from his hand when the Asgard beamed the refrigerated stores onto the Prometheus, implying that Teal'c may be lactose intolerant. In season 8, Judge wanted to take Teal'c one step closer to being more aware of Earth customs with a more Earth-like behavior, without him losing his alien perspective. He considered the first half of season 8 "the most my character has been given to do since we first started work on the series".

=== Relationships ===
At the beginning of the series, Teal'c is married to Drey'auc and has a son, Rya'c. When Teal'c defects to Earth, he leaves them behind on his homeworld, Chulak. Teal'c briefly reunites with his family in season 1's "Bloodlines" and season 2's "Family" to prevent Goa'uld influence on their life. Drey'auc marries Teal'c's childhood friend, Frotak, but Rya'c and Drey'auc leave Chulak to live in the Land of Light (from season 1's "The Broca Divide") soon after Frotak's death in "Family". Teal'c rekindles his feelings with a Tuk'ac temple priestess named Shau'nac in season 4's "Crossroads", but she is murdered soon thereafter. Drey'auc dies in a rebel Jaffa camp in season 6's "Redemption" after refusing a new larval symbiote. Teal'c begins a relationship with the Hak'tyl leader Ishta in season 7's "Birthright". He continues this relationship until at least season 8's "Sacrifices", where Rya'c also marries Kar'yn, a student of Ishta. Teal'c would also have a brief relationship with his neighbor, Krista.

O'Neill is suspicious of aliens in general except of Teal'c. At the beginning of the series, Hammond does not accept Teal'c but comes to trust and respect him after realizing Teal'c's devotion to the Stargate Program. General Landry also respects Teal'c as a warrior.

The writers at first wanted to establish animosity between Teal'c and Daniel, particularly since Teal'c is indirectly responsible for the abduction of Daniel's wife Sha're, who was subsequent selected as a host for the Goa'uld Amaunet by Teal'c's then-master Apophis. "Forever in a Day" almost tries to flesh out this animosity. Judge and Michael Shanks, in real life best friends, protested, as they thought that Daniel would be fascinated by Teal'c's background, and Teal'c would be quite respectful to humans who have similar nobility despite behaving in a different manner. The producers eventually allowed the actors to show how much their characters care about and respect each other, although the characters may not get on with one another.

For most of the run of SG-1, Teal'c is the only SG-1 member who is not from Earth. With the introduction of the human alien Jonas Quinn in season 6, the writers developed a relationship between the two aliens of the team "without making it seem exclusionary", and Teal'c is no longer the "Other" of the show. Teal'c and Jonas end up bonding because they have similar backgrounds. Christopher Judge explained that his character's amusement with Vala in seasons 9 and 10 contributed to Teal'c's loosening up.

When Cameron Mitchell is introduced in season 9, Teal'c first reacts taken aback to Mitchell's enthusiasm, being more used to O'Neill's reserved attitude. Teal'c is unsure if he likes Mitchell at first, but Mitchell forces Teal'c to interact with him. By not letting Teal'c step back and observe, Mitchell makes Teal'c an active part of the scene. Teal'c and Mitchell are both warriors and leaders, but as Teal'c was established as a powerful warrior, the producers eventually established that Mitchell gets beat up all the time in fights.

== Conceptual history ==
Christopher Judge had worked with Richard Dean Anderson before. Judge starred in a fifth season episode of MacGyver in 1990, where he played a high school student whom MacGyver tries to mentor and motivate despite negative influences.

When the producers conceptualized Teal'c, they were unsure what they wanted, but had not met anyone who was definitely Teal'c for them. They were looking for African-American actors, and Judge was one of the last actors to read for the role. Judge was hired because the producers liked what he brought into the audition. They were receptive to Judge's input and gave him the freedom to change his lines from the beginning. Judge sat down with the producers at the beginning of each season and discussed what Teal'c should go through and what would slowly make him more human.

During the first season, Teal'c seemed less well-integrated into the team than for instance O'Neill and Daniel. He was the only character who did not benefit as much from the more personal stories in season 3 and seemed to stagnate. Rumors began to surface at the end of season 3 that Judge would leave the show, but they were quickly and firmly denied. The last episodes of season 3 featured Teal'c in a more prominent role, and he benefited from additional screen time and storylines in season 4.

Judge received his first story credit for the season 5 episode "The Warrior", and later wrote "The Changeling" on his own, focusing on Teal'c's self-identity. He later penned the season 7 episode "Birthright" and the season 8 episode "Sacrifices", both dealing with the Jaffa Hak'tyl faction and Teal'c's new love interest Ishta.

=== Make-up and hair ===
Since Teal'c wears a lot of make-up, Judge had to be on-set much earlier than the rest of the cast. The producers' original idea for Teal'c included long ears and a specific beard piece, but the make-up department got it down to just a forehead symbol, an Egyptian look, and the character's gold skin tone. The make-up was reflective of the Goa'uld Ra from the Stargate feature film. In the beginning of SG-1, Teal'c's forehead symbol consisted of three parts, and it took about an hour to apply the parts to Judge's forehead. The process was simplified over the years. The season 6 episodes "The Changeling" shows Teal'c experiencing an extended hallucination of being a human on Earth. For the filming of this episode, the eye make-up and the gold paint on the character was significantly toned down. With the beginning of season 7, when Teal'c no longer had a Goa'uld symbiote in his pouch, the gold make-up was dropped.

Playing a bald-shaven head Teal'c for the first seven seasons, Judge usually let his hair grow during the show's hiatus, and shaved his head the morning of his first day back at work. For the season four premiere "Small Victories", he returned to the set with a small blond chin beard after the hiatus, as the producers had not allowed his character to have scalp hair at the time. Several episodes later, Judge shaved off the beard after acknowledging how it looked. With the beginning of season 8, after "many years of begging, pleading and politicking", Judge approached the producers again and asked for his character to have hair, and they gave in. Brad Wright was convinced that the audience would hate it. Judge showed the cornrows hairstyle that he thought Teal'c would have, at a convention, but the hair was cut short before the shooting of season 8 began. The story reasons for Teal'c's hair are never explained in the series, even despite Jack O'Neill making such an inquiry in "New Order", as he says, "What's with the hair?".

== Reception ==
In 2002, Christopher Judge was nominated for a Saturn Award in the category "Best Supporting Actor in a Television Series".
