= Full Circle (Stargate SG-1) =

- Stargate SG-1 episode
- Episode no.: Season 6 Episode 22
- Directed by: Martin Wood
- Written by: Robert C. Cooper
- Production code: 622
- Original air date: March 21, 2003
- Running time: 43 min.

Guest appearances
- Michael Shanks as Daniel Jackson; Alexis Cruz as Skaara; David Palffy as Anubis; Michael Adamthwaite as Her'ak; Gary Jones as Walter Harriman; Sean Amsing as Tobay; Vince Crestejo as Yu the Great; Veena Sood as Abydonian Leader

Episode chronology
← Previous "Prophecy"	Next → "Fallen"
- Stargate SG-1 (season 6)

"Full Circle" is the season finale for season six of the Canadian-American military science fiction television series Stargate SG-1. It was originally intended to be the last episode of Stargate SG-1. The episode was written by executive producer Robert C. Cooper and directed by Martin Wood. The episodes received an average Nielsen household rating and a low syndication rating compared to other season six episodes. The episode got strong reviews from major media publishers worldwide.

"Full Circle" follows the Ascended Daniel Jackson contacting Jack O'Neill and tells him that Anubis has located The Eye of Ra, an enormously powerful weapon that can defeat the combined forces of the Goa'uld System Lords. SG-1 then travels to Abydos to create a defensive position against the Goa'uld Army, Anubis then appears over the planet and threatens to destroy it if they don't give him The Eye of Ra.

== Plot ==
On Abydos, Skaara speaks with the Abydonian elders about Anubis, who will attack soon. In the middle of their council, Daniel appears, telling them that they will not fight alone. At the SGC, Col. O'Neill steps on an elevator, which malfunctions in the middle of the ride. Just as he tries to use the emergency phone, Daniel appears behind him and updates him on the situation with Anubis, who plans to get the "Eye of Ra" from Abydos, a key (along with five others) to using a super weapon. Jack demands to know why Daniel, with all the powers of the Ascended, can't stop Anubis himself, and Daniel tries to explain again what he is and is not allowed to do.

Jack relays Daniel's intel to General Hammond and SG-1. When they ask where he got that kind of information, he reluctantly admits to seeing Daniel, and that it isn't the first time. No one seems terribly surprised to hear it, and Teal'c mentions that he, too, has seen Daniel. Hammond approves the mission, and SG-1 goes to Abydos where they meet up with Ska'ara, who brings them into an underground chamber, where they hope to find the Eye. While Sam and Jonas explore the chamber, Jack asks Ska'ara if he's seeing anyone, and Ska'ara tells him that he's betrothed. In the meantime, Anubis' mothership appears out of hyperspace and several ships fly to the pyramid, which is defended by Teal'c and a number of Abydonians. When the ships and ground troops attack, Teal'c radios Jack, who, irked by Daniel's absence, starts yelling for Daniel. Daniel appears and tries to say he still can't help, but Jack pushes him. Giving in, Daniel agrees to help Sam and Jonas figure out how to find the chamber while Jack and Ska'ara go above to assist Teal'c. Daniel, Major Carter, and Jonas open the chamber, full of artifacts, but not the Eye. In the pyramid, Ska'ara is mortally wounded while Jack and Teal'c fight valiantly to hold their ground. They are finally forced retreat to the underground chamber where Daniel concludes that the other ascended beings are Ancients. They discover a tablet, written in the language of the Ancients, which reveals information about a lost city of the Ancients. Daniel instructs Jonas to guard it with his life, then departs.

Carter and Jonas find another secret chamber, which Sam shoots open, revealing the Eye. Jack and Teal'c, with Ska'ara, appear, bedraggled from the Jaffa onslaught. Their leader, Herak, confronts SG-1, demanding the Eye. Jack simply threatens to destroy the Eye. Herak returns to the ship and informs Anubis. As Herak departs, Daniel confronts Anubis, who reveals what he truly is, a partially ascended being. In space, a fleet of Ha'tak vessels appears and Yu contacts Anubis, threatening to destroy him. Daniel, on the other hand, offers Anubis a deal: he will bring him the Eye if Anubis promises to leave Abydos unharmed forever. The Goa'uld agrees. Daniel goes to SG-1, where he hears to his surprise that Ska'ara has died and ascended, realizing that Oma must be present. He advises the team of Anubis' partially ascended state: stuck between the mortal world and the ascended one. Anubis was thought dead but actually ascended. The Ancients, only accepting pure of heart among their ranks, de-ascended him but not completely. The shimmering energy that hides his true face keeps his form intact. He also informs them about his deal with Anubis because he wants SG-1 to find the lost city of the Ancients before Anubis can.

O'Neill surrenders the Eye to Herak and the Jaffa leave. On the ship, Herak gives Anubis the Eye, and Anubis powers up a large weapon. It fires on Yu's ships and destroys many of them. The few left retreat, unable to penetrate Anubis' shields, with Lord Yu, also still alive. Anubis plans to destroy Abydos but Daniel appears and demands that Anubis stop. Anubis refuses, and goads Daniel into attacking him. Daniel attempts to use his ascended powers to destroy him. However, his attack is cut short, and he is spirited away by Oma Desala. Anubis, rid of his last obstacle, fires the superweapon at the pyramid on Abydos, where Jack is, and Jack slips through the event horizon of the Abydos Stargate and back to the SGC just in time. The planet Abydos is then destroyed.

Back at SGC, SGC personnel attempt to dial back to Abydos, but they are unable to connect, and fear that Abydos has been obliterated by Anubis's superweapon. SG-1 continue to brief General Hammond about the situation and everything that transpired on Abydos. Carter and Walter continue dialing Abydos, as Carter refuses to believe that the planet is gone. Suddenly, after dozens of attempts, the Stargate establishes a wormhole to Abydos. Hammond allows SG-1 to return to Abydos to find out what has happened. SG-1 goes through the gate and discovers Ska'ara and his people. Astonished and yet relieved, SG-1 ask Ska'ara what happened. Ska'ara tells them that Oma helped all the Abydonian people around the planet ascend and that the people and the Stargate are only an illusion. Ska'ara sadly informs them that he has not heard anything about Daniel's fate. Suddenly, all the people disappear. Relieved that the Abydonians had not perished during Anubis's attack, SG-1 then returns to Earth.

== Production ==
"Full Circle" was written with the intention of being the last Stargate SG-1 television episode, since the producers were already planning to release a Stargate film. When creating the Jaffa underlings for Anubis, the producers wanted to have something different. So, according to Joseph Mallozzi, they created "Ninja"-like Jaffa.

"Full Circle" was originally intended to be the last episode of Stargate SG-1. It is also the last episode to feature Corin Nemec (who portrayed Jonas Quinn) as a main cast member. It is also the last episode where Alexis Cruz (who portrayed Skaara) appears. Nemec was open to continue playing Jonas Quinn after season 6 or in a feature film or a spin-off series, but a new contract was reached with Michael Shanks for Daniel to return in season 7. The role of Jonas was therefore reduced to recurring status in season 7. Nemec welcomed the producers' openness for story pitches and offered several story ideas. He wrote the mid-season-7 episode "Fallout" and considered pitching more stories afterwards, but he became busy with other projects. Jonas is seldom mentioned in the series after this point but after Season 10's "Counterstrike" stated that the Ori conquered Jonas's homeworld, Stargate producer Joseph Mallozzi said in his blog that "in [his] mind, Jonas went underground and is still alive somewhere, resisting the Ori army."

== Broadcast and reception ==
"Full Circle" and previous episode "Prophecy" were first broadcast as a double-bill on February 19, 2003 on Sky One in the United Kingdom. "Prophecy" was watched by 92 thousand households and was the third most watched program on Sky One that week, whilst "Full Circle" achieved 1.01 million viewers and was the second most watched program on the channel that week, with The Simpsons in first position. The episode was then broadcast on the Sci-Fi Channel in the United States on March 21, 2003. The episode earned a 1.8 household rating, up 0.1 on the previous week.

TV Guide included the episode amongst their top picks of the day on March 21, 2003. Reviewing for TV Zone, Jan Vincent-Rudzki awarded the episode 7 out of 10, calling it an "unfulfilling" end to the season, believing the episode "just needing someone to muse on the future, rather than have SG-1 go to a Stargate as if it was just another day". Vincent-Rudzki believed that locating the Eye of Ra was an "episode-spanning idea condensed into too short a time".
