= Stargate SG-1: The Alliance =

Cancelled video game

- Developer: Perception Pty
- Artist: Jason Morris
- Writer: Ben Lenzo
- Composers: Scott Cairns; Alex Wallbank
- Engine: Unreal Engine 2.5
- Platforms: Xbox, PS2, Windows
- Release: Cancelled
- Genre: First-person shooter
- Modes: Single-player, Multiplayer

Stargate SG-1: The Alliance is a cancelled first and third person shooter video game based around the television series Stargate SG-1. The game had been intended for release on Xbox, PlayStation 2 and Windows. Set after the eighth season of Stargate SG-1, players would have taken control of the four original characters from the television series; General Jack O'Neill, Colonel Samantha Carter, Dr. Daniel Jackson and Teal'c.

MGM awarded developer Perception Pty the Stargate license in 2003. Perception selected JoWooD Productions Software AG to distribute the title and in 2005 JoWood brought Namco on board to publish the game in the United States. Perception and JoWood ended their relationship in August 2005 due to disputes regarding payment, quality of the game and failure to meet deadlines. Perception continued to develop the game until January 2006 when they were forced to cancel after MGM failed to approve a new publisher. Perception and JoWood were embroiled in multiple lengthy legal disputes regarding ownership of the game license, money owed as well as accusations of libel.

By the time development ceased, the game had reached the alpha build stage of development, with much of the game in a playable state. Different builds of the project have both leaked online or been given to specific individuals.

== Gameplay ==
Stargate SG-1: The Alliance was to be shooter video game which would allow players to choose either first or third-person. In the main campaign, at the start of each mission the player is assigned either General Jack O'Neill, Colonel Samantha Carter, Teal'c or Dr. Daniel Jackson, with each of the characters having their own unique abilities. O'Neill would be able to use a sniper rifle, Carter a Goa'uld ribbon device as well as hack enemy computers, Jackson would have a hand-of-light weapon as well as translate alien text to help solve puzzles within the game and Teal'c would have a melee attack. As the player progresses through the story this would have opened up "new skills and possibilities".

Players would be able to play through the campaign in either single player, with AI assuming control of the other 3 members of SG-1 or cooperatively with up-to three other players using split screen or online. A command system would allow the player to issue commands to the rest of SG-1, such as attacking specific enemies or taking cover. The player would also be responsible for keeping their teammates alive, reviving them if they became incapacitated during combat. During missions and combat the members of SG-1 talk to each other as well as delivering dialog relevant to the story. In each mission the player must reach checkpoints to save their progress.

SG-1 and the player would be equipped with an Asgard energy shield allowing them to sustain a small amount of fire before needing to recharge as well as a personnel cloaking device. Between 25 and 30 weapons would have featured in the game, including many from the television series such as the P90, Zat'nik'tel and Staff Weapon. The Zat's power had to be reduced from the television series. Players would be able to pick up additional weapons and equipment during the missions.

The game would have put SG-1 up against a wide range of enemies from the television series, including Goa'uld Jaffa and Kull Warriors, Replicators, Reetou as well as introducing a new enemy, the Haaken. Allies included Thor, General George Hammond, Oma Desala, Shifu, the Tok'ra including Jacob Carter and the Langarans including Jonas Quinn. The player would be able to drive and operate a number of land vehicles such as military humvee as well as a Goa'uld Semekhet. SG-1 would come up against a number of enemy spacecraft such as Goa'uld Death Gliders, Al'Kesh, Tel'tak and Ha'tak.

Multiplayer would have included a number of different modes including capture the flag, death match and supported up to 16 players online. Other multiplayer modes would have included Jaffa, Enslave and Last Man Standing. Both Stargate Command and the alien planet Abydos would have been amongst the multiplayer maps. A map editor was also planned, although may have been a post-launch addition to the game.

== Plot ==
=== Setting and characters ===
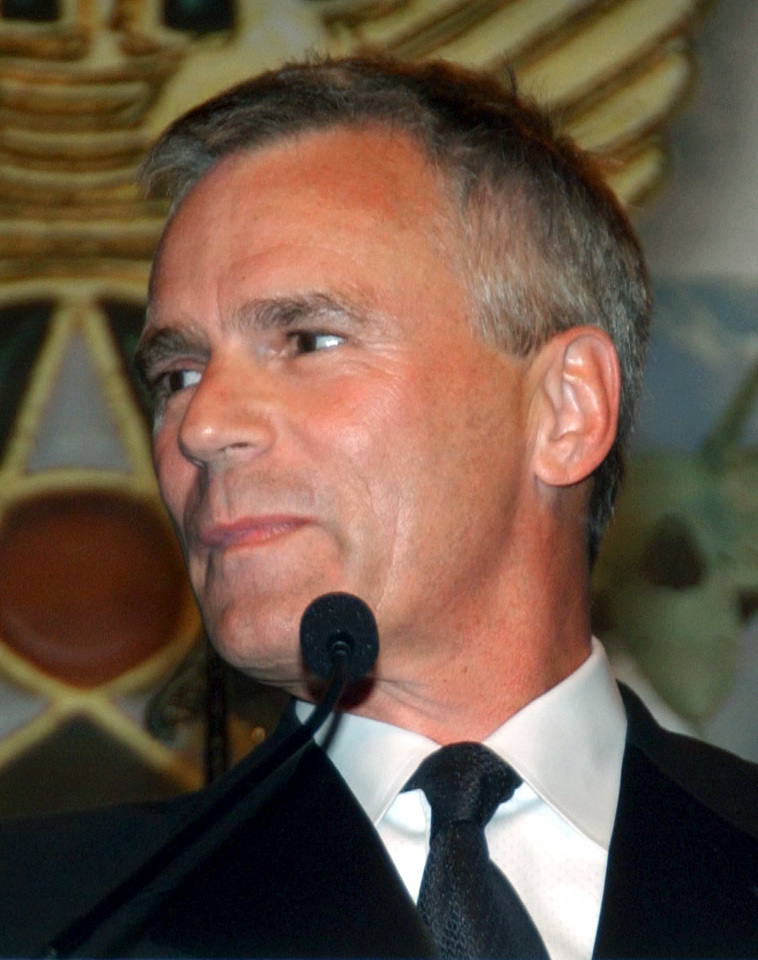
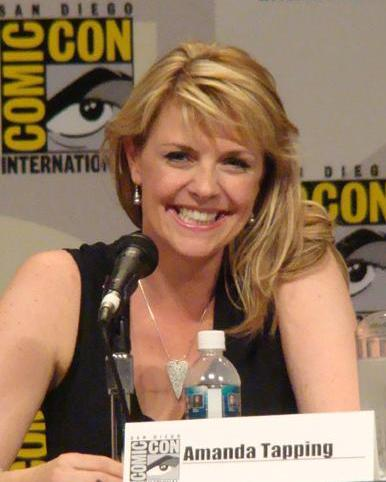
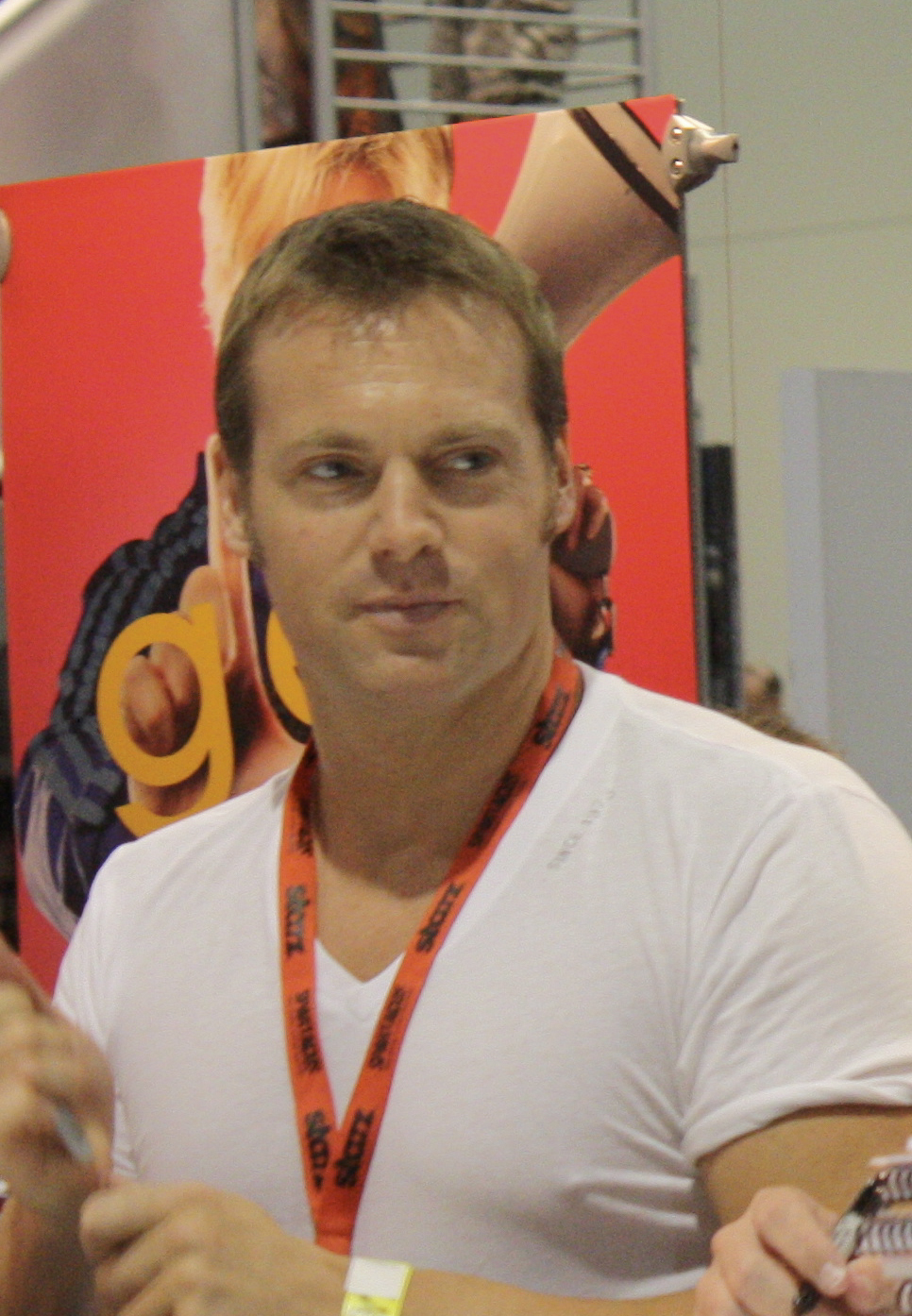
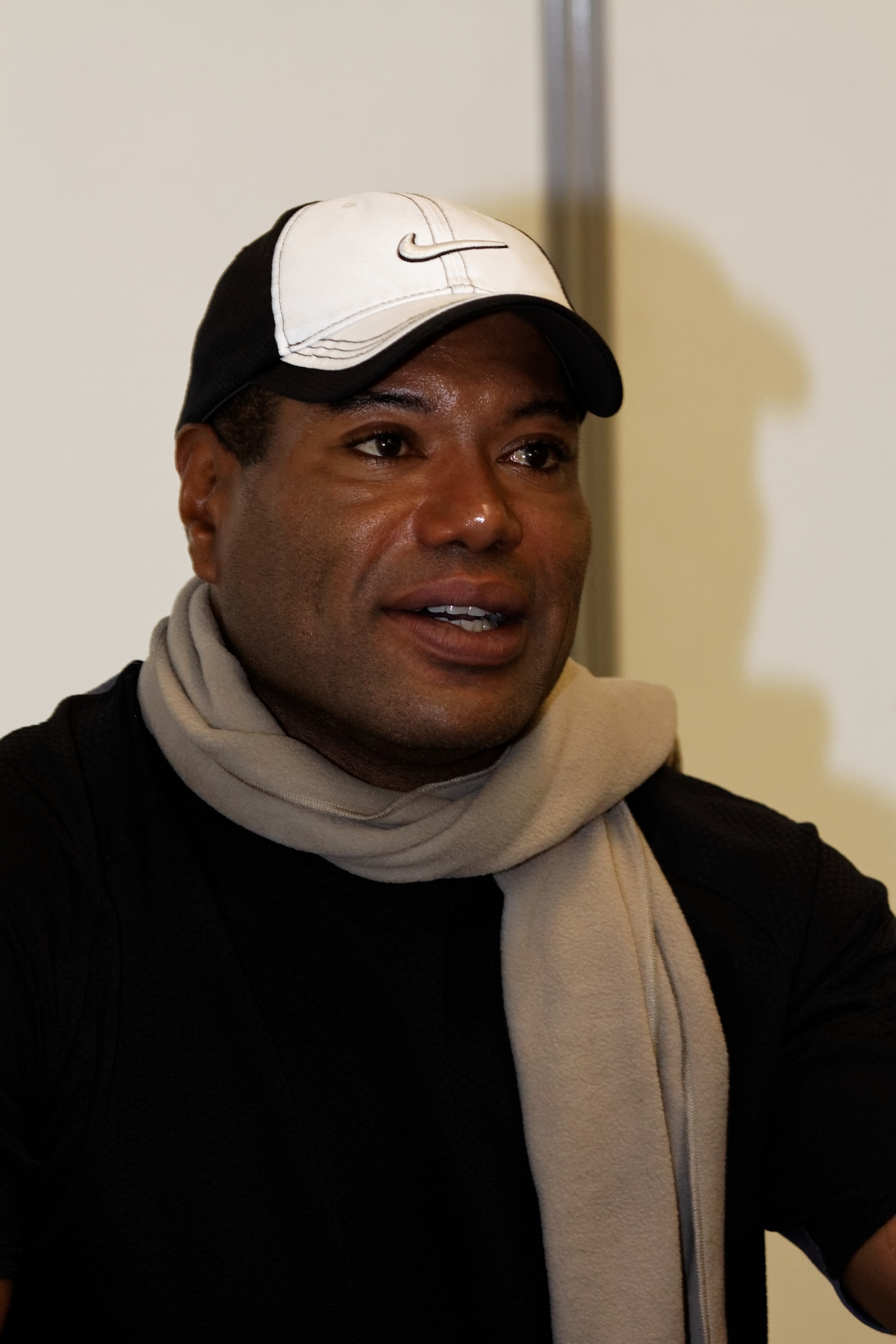
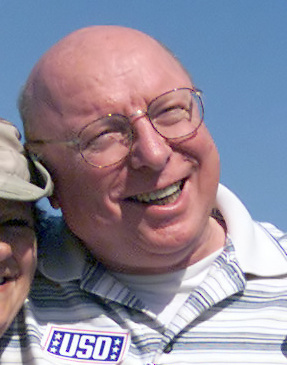
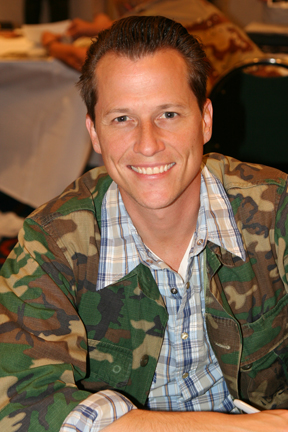
Top row: Richard Dean Anderson (left), Amanda Tapping (middle) and Michael Shanks respectively play the roles of Jack O'Neill, Samantha Carter and Daniel Jackson.
Bottom-row: Christopher Judge (left), Don S. Davis and Corin Nemec respectively reprise their roles as Teal'c, George Hammond and Jonas Quinn.

The Alliance takes place towards the end of season eight of Stargate SG-1. Two of earth's enemies, Anubis and the Replicators are at large and SG-1 work with a number of allies such as the Tok'ra, Ancients, Reetou and Asgard to stop them.

The game follows the actions of SG-1 which is led by General Jack O'Neill, second in command is Colonel Samantha Carter and they are joined by Dr. Daniel Jackson and Teal'c. They are voiced by Richard Dean Anderson, Amanda Tapping, Michael Shanks and Christopher Judge who portray the characters in Stargate SG-1.

Throughout the story, SG-1 interact with a number of other characters from Stargate SG-1, including General George Hammond, Jonas Quinn, Jacob Carter, Anubis, Walter Harriman and Siler voiced by Don S. Davis, Corin Nemec, Carmen Argenziano, David Palffy, Gary Jones and Dan Shea. Thor, voiced by Shanks, as well as Oma and Shifu also feature.

=== Story ===
Thor has travelled to Stargate Command to enlist the help of General Jack O'Neill, Dr. Daniel Jackson, Colonel Samantha Carter and Teal'c. He tells them that the Goa'uld Anubis has laid waste to several worlds seemingly searching for an artefact and the Asgard have been unable to stop him. Thor provides the location of a world designated P3C-796 which being targeted by Anubis' forces and SG-1 and SG-2 travel there in the hope of uncovering what it is he's doing. Whilst exploring the planet, SG-1 uncover a number of runes being excavated by Anubis' forces with contain Stargate symbols on them as well as discovering an artefact, which SG-1 take back to Stargate Command for further study.

Examining the artefacts recovered, Daniel believes the language belongs to the Ancients and soon experiences a vision of a highly technologically advanced race revelling in slaughtering another race. Meanwhile, SG-2 and SG-12 are sent to the gate-address that SG-1 recovered from P3C-796. At a mission briefing, Daniel has another vision, this time it is of Shifu who explains to Daniel that Anubis is attempting to unleash something that had originally been imprisoned by the Ancients. Shifu goes on to tell Daniel that Oma Desala will wait for him at Kheb. Anubis' forces have arrived at the planet that SG-2 and SG-12 are on. Unable to escape to the Stargate, SG-1 have been sent to rescue them. O'Neill and Daniel work around an abandoned city whilst Carter and Teal'c drive the humvee in to rescue the stranded and injured SG personnel, with Major Grey Coulder having secured a second artefact. All the SG teams escape through the Stargate except Daniel and Jack, who struggle to evade Anubis' forces until Jacob Carter arrives in a Cargo Ship having been tipped off by Thor. On the 6 day journey back to Earth, General George Hammond assumes temporary command of Stargate Command, with General Jack O'Neill taking temporary command of SG-1.

SG-1 are sent to another world where SG-2 have gone missing whilst searching for a third part of the artefact. The team make their way through an abandoned city which has been occupied by Anubis' forces and soon locate Coulder and Burnett of SG-2. Coulder tells O'Neill that the rest of their team were killed and that he hid the third artefact so that Anubis' forces would be unable to find it. SG-1 go with Coulder to retrieve the artefact but are ambushed. Burnett is executed and Coulder, along with the artefact are captured. Back on Earth, SG-1 and Hammond believe Anubis may try to attack them and steal their 2 pieces of the artefact. SG-1 travels to Kheb in order to meet with Oma. She explains to Daniel that Anubis has unleashed a race called the Haaken who had been imprisoned by the Ancients thousands of years ago after they used Ancient technology to relentlessly attack the Ancients, Asgard, Nox and Furlings. She tells SG-1 that there are three pieces of the artefact and that it was originally created by the Ancients to bind the Haaken away, and that Anubis seeks it in order to control the Haaken. She also believes that the artefact could be used against the Ancients.

On board the Earth spaceship Prometheus, SG-1 and heading to the beta-site when they are diverted to Langara as it is under attack from Anubis once more. Once on the surface, they must recue Jonas Quinn who has been captured. Upon freeing Jonas he tells them that Anubis has come to take their supply of Naquadria, a powerful mineral, and is heading to a planet in the Lamora system. In the Lamora system, SG-1 infiltrate a shipyard controlled by Anubis where he is using the technology of the Haaken along with the Naquadria to build a new type of Death Glider space fighter craft which would be impervious to their current weapons. SG-1 destroy the plans and escape in a Goa'uld Cargo Ship. They learn that Anubis plans to attack a Tok'ra base where an anti-supersoldier weapon is being worked on, so decide to go there to warn them.

On the Tok'ra base they meet Jacob Carter and begin evacuating the Tok'ra as Anubis arrives. SG-1 along with Jacob work their way around the base to secure the anti-kull weapon and head back to Earth. Daniel has another vision of a planet which Oma previously showed him, but this time he sees Coulder being held there by Anubis and the Haaken. SG-1 along with their Reetou allies arrive on the planet from Daniel's vision and soon encounter the Haaken. On the mission, the Reetou explain to Daniel that the Haaken nearly wiped their race out thousands of years ago. Oma uses her powers to attack the Haaken, forcing SG-1 into a temple where they are attacked by the Haaken's leader. She tells Daniel that it was in fact her that showed him Coulder in a vision in order to lure SG-1 to the planet. Stargate Command locate Coulder on board a Goa'uld moon base and SG-1 are sent to extract him. Once back at Stargate Command they receive word that Anubis is attacking their beta site. SG-1 are sent to the planet and assist in the evacuation, helping to defend the base and extract a group of scientists back to Stargate Command.

The Iris protecting Earth's Stargate malfunctions and Anubis' forces breach the base in search of pieces of the artefact. Daniel discovers that the piece that Coulder recovered is a fake which has been engineered by Anubis to disable the Stargate Command Iris and SG-1 work their way through the base battling Anubis' forces in order to destroy it. In the process Anubis' forces are able to retrieve the two real pieces. It transpires that Coulder has been brainwashed by Anubis and SG-1 have to kill him as he attempts to destroy Stargate Command. who has been brainwashed by Anubis. SG-1 defeat Coulder who attempts to destroy the base. Thor takes SG-1 to Anubis' base of operations on Tartarus where the team infiltrate the base, destroying the shield protecting the Tartarus Stargate allowing Stargate Command personnel to launch an all out attack on Anubis' fortress. SG-1 search the base for the artefacts but soon the Haaken arrive in orbit and also attack Anubis, who retreats. The Haaken retrieve the completed artefact, an amulet, and SG-1 transport up to the Haaken mothership in order to retrieve it. They defeat the Haaken leader and are able to bind the Haaken away once more.

== Development ==
Australian video game developer Perception Pty began development in January 2003. The company had been looking "for a license with which to develop a game on" and were exploring a number of options, but as Perception chief executive officer Ben Lenzo and a number of the staff "loved Stargate", they ultimately approached MGM, believing the Stargate franchise was a "perfect fit for video games". According to Lenzo, MGM awarded Perception the license after showing them a prototype of a game they were working on and because of their passion for Stargate. Perception and MGM initially had a "couple of false starts" before eventually arriving at what would be developed into Stargate SG-1: The Alliance.

As part of growing Perception, chief executive officer Ben Lenzo intended to invest in Austrian video game publisher JoWooD Productions Software, a Public company, and on September 10, 2003, the two companies announced that they were entering a "strategic alliance" together. The agreement that was announced included Perception acquiring "a strategic stake in JoWooD", which Lenzo later revealed would have been in the region of EUR 9 million. According to JoWood's announcement, the deal also included "the publishing rights for a top international license from a world-leading film studio", with the statement going on to detail that as part of the agreement "Perception, as the licensor, will entrust JoWooD with the global publishing of the title". On November 17, 2003, JoWood announced that new stocks would be made available in order to generate capital to fund new projects, going on to announce that they would be publishing a Stargate game that was being developed by Perception. Stargate SG-1: The Alliance was officially announced by Perception on March 22, 2004. MGM announced in May 2004 that MGM Interactive Inc. and Perception PTY would work "closely" with the United States Air Force "to ensure the authenticity found in the hit Stargate SG-1 television series is carried into the much-awaited videogame based on the show".

=== Writing ===
Ben Lenzo and the team at Perception came up with the story. Perception were given complete access to all of the episodes of Stargate SG-1, as well as photographs and blueprints of all the shows sets and props. The Stargate SG-1 creative team were not involved on a day-to-day basis, however the team at Perception would consult with them regarding the story and dialog. Writer, producer & director Peter DeLuise directed the main dialog recording sessions with the Stargate SG-1 cast. DeLuise also served as story editor.

In creating The Alliance, Lenzo was keen that the game appeal to not only fans of Stargate SG-1, but also be accessible to those that hadn't seen the show. One of the ways he planned on implementing this was by "taking some of the major themes that have been in the show for the last few years and tying our storyline into that", but at the same time creating an entirely new enemy that the game would focus around - the Haaken. The Haaken came about from Perception's "desire to add something to the Stargate lore, to have some memorable impact on it" and were imagined by Perception as having been imprisoned thousands of years ago by the Ancients. According to lead artist Jason Morris the Haaken "needed to be scary, fast and intelligent looking". Character concept artist Alison Bond originally imagined the Haaken as a more reptilian-looking and beast like, however as it progressed they wanted the race to look more intelligent, so began adding in human features. The games title The Alliance was chosen in reference to Anubis' alliance with the Haaken. The game also introduced another race called the Extrenites, imagined as a "doe-like", passive race, who are destroyed by the Haaken.

In order to make each of the playable characters unique, their abilities from the television series were drawn and often expanded upon. This included giving O'Neill a sniper rifle, Carter a Goa'uld ribbon device, Teal'c a melee attack and Jackson a "hand-of-light" ability. Jackson's abilities were altered a number of times based upon feedback from the shows writers, with his power originally setting enemies on fire, before being changed so that he could instead harness the power the Ancients and send enemies "to a different plain". Another objective which the Perception team were keen to meet was in capturing the humour of the television series and translate it into the game, both during missions and in cutscenes.

=== Design ===
The game was built using a "heavily modified and graphically enhanced" Unreal engine 2.5. The actors underwent a facial scanning process so that their likeness could be recreated in the game. The number of polygons was then altered dependent on the platform, with each character being between 2500 and 3500 polygons. The Perception team responsible for The Alliance was made up of between 50 and 60 people working out of Sydney, as well as around 12 external contractors. Work on the campaign missions was largely divided amongst 3 different teams, with each team working on a number of missions. Teams consisted of a team lead, three artists, a level designer and a coder.

The game would not feature any of score from Stargate SG-1. Instead, the score was composed specifically for the game by Scott Cairns and Alex Wallbank. David Anthony and Aldo Sampaio at Perception developed a dynamic audio system that allowed the audio to cross fade between different score, dependant on what was happening in the game. Perception were given access to all of the sound effects from the television series.

According to Viljar Sommerback, the game had just passed the alpha stage of development and the game was "playable most of the way" but there were however "a lot of polish and bug fixing left to be done". The PC version was furthest along in development, followed by the Xbox version, whilst the PS2 was slightly behind that, with Lenzo commenting "The Unreal Engine was difficult to work with on the PS2. James Steele, our PS2 Lead, is still ripping his hair out about". Perception knew that they would miss their initial September 2005 finish date and before their dispute with JoWood had expected to move the release to February 2006.

== Planned release, promotion and cancelation ==
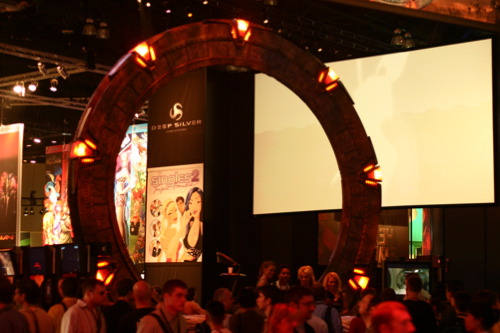
The Stargate at E3 2005

The game was originally slated for release in late 2005 and would have been released on the Xbox, PlayStation 2 and PC. The first preview of the game was given in the Stargate SG-1 season eight episode "Avatar", which was broadcast in August 2004. In the episode, Teal'c becomes trapped in a simulation, with Perception creating the graphics in the style of the video game to represent the simulation. Perception launched the games official website in November 2004, offering the first screenshots from the game. In December 2004 MGM offered the opportunity for fans to bid to have their likeness used as within the game.

The first teaser trailer for the game was released on March 5, 2005. The game was first shown at E3 in May 2005, with attendees able to play a level from game in both the Namco and JoWood booths. Stargate SG-1 star Richard Dean Anderson appeared at the event in order to promote the game. The full trailer released was released at E3 and made available online days after the event. A featurette which included footage of the game and interviews with the Perception team was included on the Stargate SG-1 Season 8 Volume 43 DVD, first released in July 2005. In order to tie the video game into the show, the shows producers planned to either show or mention the encounter with the Haaken in an episode.

Perception were developing a second Stargate game which would have been a role-playing video game. The game would have had ties to Stargate Atlantis and allowed players to create a character that was either good or evil. Their concept also included players controlling Anubis and gameplay would have allowed the character to take possession of other beings in order to gain their abilities.

=== Cancelation and legal dispute ===
On May 10, 2005, publisher JoWood announced the closing of a distribution agreement with Nobilis IBERICA, that would give Noilis distribution rights of JoWood titles, including Stargate SG-1: The Alliance, in Portugal and Spain. The following week, JoWood also announced its partnership with Namco, who would release the game in the USA. According to Lenzo, all sub-licensing of the game had to be approved by Perception, and chiefly by MGM. JoWood mistakenly sent both Perception and MGM a copy of the contract which had been "signed a month before" by Namco, instead of a draft contract. This now meant that Perception had unknowingly breached their contract with MGM by letting JoWood sub-license, with Lenzo claiming that "shit hit the fan" but that ultimately they went forward with Namco. After meeting members of the Namco team at E3 in May 2005, Lenzo then learnt that Namco had been told by JoWood that it was them who held the rights to the Stargate game and had the relationship with MGM, not Perception.

In July 2005, Lenzo traveled to Austria to meet with JoWood, who had not been paying Perception and had been in breach of their contract since December 2004. JoWood, had been restructuring for some time, with their founder Andreas Tobler being replaced by Dr. Albert Seidl in January 2005 due to "the clear failure to meet the sales targets in 2004". In their meeting, Lenzo alleged that he was told by Seidl that JoWood "would have gone under" had Perception pulled the contract from them. Lenzo "didn't want to be held responsible for 30 people losing their jobs" so gave them until August 5, 2005, to pay, else Perception would terminate their contract.

On the August 5 deadline JoWood announced that they had been "forced to cancel the development agreement with Perception, the Australian developer currently responsible for the Stargate SG-1: The Alliance". With the game scheduled to be released that October and Seidl claimed that in its current form it did not "satisfy neither our quality requirements nor the fans expectations", going on to state that JoWood had lost confidence in Perception's ability to finish the game "in time and sufficient quality". In JoWood's statement, they announced their expectation of "repayment of their investment in development and further expenses" and that rights to the title and game assets would be transferred to JoWood where they would review the possibility of continuing work with another developer.

The following week on August 12, 2005, Perception put out their own press release stating that as the licensee, they were continuing development of the game writing "any suggestion that JoWooD has rights to Stargate SG-1: The Alliance upon termination of the contract is incorrect and not based on commercial or legal fact". They went on to announce that they would take legal action against JoWood CEO Albert Seidl and the companies chairman of the supervisory board, Andreas Rudas for libel.

On August 29, 2005, the hearing began in the regional court of Leoben, Austria, with Perception seeking to have JoWood declared bankrupt. JoWood CEO Dr. Albert Seidl meanwhile countered he had the right to terminate the contract and that Perception owed them EUR 5.5 million for the development of the game. The motion to have JoWood declared bankrupt was rejected by the judge on September 7, 2005. JoWood announced that they had filed a fraud report against Perception on October 3, 2005, and were seeking to reclaim the EUR 5.5 million they had invested in the game, citing that Perception had been unable to delivered the game to the desired quality in the agreed time frame.

According to Lenzo, Namco had still been happy with distribute the game in the United States until JoWood continued to claim ownership over the game which lead Namco to cut all ties. Perception then had 3 publishers interested in taking over, but Lenzo commented that MGM wouldn't approve them. In January 2006 Perception ceased development of Stargate SG-1: The Alliance having run out of money and been unable to have MGM approve a new publisher.

Perception then filed another lawsuit against JoWood in November 2007 for damages of EUR 8 million. In the private prosecution of Albert Seidl and Andreas Rudas for alleged credit-damaging statements, the Vienna Regional Court found Perception's allegations to be inaccurate in June 2008, although this was not final.

== Early reception and legacy ==
Reviewing the preview presented at E3 2005, Kelly Heckman for Gamers Info praised the developers for recreating elements from the series in "painstaking detail" believing that it would find its core audience from fans of the show as well as appealing to fans of tactical shooters. Also reviewing the preview at E3, Ivan Sulic for IGN commented that whilst the TV series was more about adventures and exploring, the game was "all about the shooting", praising the game's physics and graphic detail, but felt that the game would need a "fair bit of work" before launching.

Discussing the game PlayStation Official Magazine – Australia wrote "You immediately feel like you're in the Stargate universe the second the menu screen appears". Reviewing an unfinished PC build of the game, The Gaming Liberty called it "the game Stargate fans were hoping for" describing the story as "wonderful".

PtoPOnline has extensively covered the game over, providing campaign playthrough videos on both YouTube and their website. In 2012 The Gaming Liberty ran a number of features showcasing videos, screenshots and interviews from the cancelled game. White Pointer Gaming, who worked on the game at Perception gave a mission playthrough on YouTube in 2020. In 2021 Alex Walker for Kotaku bemoaned the lack of Stargate SG-1 video games, comparing the cancelled Alliance video game to the 2005 title Star Wars: Republic Commando, writing that "had all the quips, sounds and references Stargate fans would appreciate".
