= Stargate SG-1 season 5 =

Season of television series

Stargate SG-1
- Season 5
- DVD cover
- Starring: Richard Dean Anderson; Michael Shanks; Amanda Tapping; Christopher Judge; Don S. Davis
- No. of episodes: 22

Release
- Original network: Showtime
- Original release: June 29, 2001 – February 6, 2002

Season chronology
- ← Previous; Season 4 Next → Season 6

The fifth season of the military science fiction television series Stargate SG-1 commenced airing on Showtime in the United States on June 29, 2001, concluded on Sky1 in the United Kingdom on February 6, 2002, and contained 22 episodes. The fifth season introduces future main character Jonas Quinn portrayed by Corin Nemec from 2002–2004. The fifth season is about the ongoing war with the Goa'uld Empire after the death of Apophis at the start of the season and the rise of a new System Lord named Anubis. SG-1, a military-science team, are set to explore the Milky Way Galaxy.

The one-hour premiere "Enemies", which debuted on June 29, 2001, on Showtime had the lowest syndication of the seasons episode, but overall got a high viewership level. This would be the last season to feature Apophis alive, but he would return in dreams and alternate realities and timelines. The series was developed by Brad Wright and Jonathan Glassner. Season five regular cast members include Richard Dean Anderson, Michael Shanks, Amanda Tapping, with Christopher Judge, and Don S. Davis.

== Production ==
Many crew members appeared in "Wormhole X-Treme!", the 100th episode of Stargate SG-1. The director of a Wormhole X-Treme! episode, played by Peter DeLuise, was the director of this Stargate SG-1 episode. A Wormhole X-Treme! writer is played by Robert C. Cooper, a Stargate SG-1 writer and executive producer. Further cameos include Joseph Mallozzi (who co-wrote this episode), producer N. John Smith, and Stargate SG-1 writer Ron Wilkerson as Wormhole X-Treme! crew members; Stargate SG-1 property master David Sinclair as the Wormhole X-Treme! assistant director; make-up artist Jan Newman as a make-up artist; director Andy Mikita and producer John Lenic as the characters being beaten by Col. Danning; Stargate SG-1 director Martin Wood as an NID agent; and several more. The two executives who commented on how unrealistic Lloyd's spacecraft looked are played by Stargate SG-1 executive producer Michael Greenburg and executive producer/co-creator Brad Wright.

In "Proving Ground", Elisabeth Rosen appears as Lieutenant Jennifer Hailey, who originally appeared in the episode "Prodigy". Courtenay J. Stevens appears as Lieutenant Elliot, a role which he would reprise in the episodes "Summit" and "Last Stand". He would also later appear in the first season of Stargate Atlantis, playing the role of Keras in "Childhood's End." David Kopp appears as Lieutenant Grogan, who would return in Season Five episode "The Sentinel". Grace Park, famed for her appearance on the re-imagined Battlestar Galactica as Sharon Valerii, makes an appearance as Lieutenant Satterfield. "48 Hours" marks the first appearance of David Hewlett as Rodney McKay. He would recur in future Stargate SG-1 episodes and join the main cast of Stargate Atlantis. For "Summit", Martouf was originally meant to appear, having survived "Divide and Conquer." However, J. R. Bourne was unavailable for filming, which necessitated developing a new host for Lantash.

Jonas Quinn makes his first appearance in "Meridian" and goes on to take Daniel Jackson's place on SG-1 throughout season six. Jackson does not appear in "Revelations". However, it is implied at the end that the breeze SG-1 feels is Daniel. Michael Shanks does appear as the voice of Thor. This is the last episode where Michael Shanks would be listed in the main cast until season seven. Teryl Rothery who portrayed Janet Fraiser does the voice of Heimdall. According to the episode audio commentary, Rothery performed her lines on-set to help give the actors a reference point. However, Richard Dean Anderson, Christopher Judge and Rothery could not keep a straight face as the eye line they were given was a blinking light in Rothery's chest. This episode ended the SG-1 tradition of ending the season with a cliffhanger until Season 9.

== Reception ==
"Enemies" was nominated for an Emmy in the category "Outstanding Special Visual Effects for a Series" and a Gemini Award in the category "Best Visual Effects". For "Ascension", Amanda Tapping won a Leo Award in the category "Dramatic Series: Best Lead Performance – Female". For "Proving Ground", Andy Mikita was nominated for a Leo Award in the category "Dramatic Series: Best Director". "The Warrior" was nominated for a Leo Award in the category "Dramatic Series: Best Overall Sound". "Revelations" was nominated for an Emmy in the category "Outstanding Special Visual Effects for a Series" and won a Gemini Award in the category "Best Visual Effects".

== Main cast ==
- Starring Richard Dean Anderson as Colonel Jack O'Neill
- Michael Shanks as Dr. Daniel Jackson
- Amanda Tapping as Major Samantha Carter
- With Christopher Judge as Teal'c
- And Don S. Davis as Major General George Hammond

== Episodes ==
Episodes in bold are continuous episodes, where the story spans over 2 or more episodes.

No. overall	No. in season	Title	Directed by	Written by	Original release date
89	1	"**Enemies**"	Martin Wood	Story by : Brad Wright, Robert C. Cooper, Joseph Mallozzi & Paul Mullie; Teleplay by : Robert C. Cooper	June 29, 2001
After Apophis has brainwashed Teal'c, SG-1 and Jacob prepare to fight against their foe on board Cronus's ship. A mysterious ship then appears and attacks Apophis' ship, disabling it, and causing them to flee, giving SG-1 the chance to get on board. But danger lurks in the form of an army of Replicator bugs and an auto-destruct program.
90	2	"**Threshold**"	Peter DeLuise	Brad Wright	July 6, 2001
Teal'c has been saved from dying on Apophis' ship but remains loyal to his old master. Bra'tac uses an old Jaffa ritual that will either bring Teal'c back or kill him.
91	3	"Ascension"	Martin Wood	Robert C. Cooper	July 13, 2001
After falling unconscious, Carter returns from Velona (P3X-636), a planet full of ruins, suffering from suspected exhaustion. But she begins seeing a mysterious young man named Orlin who can walk through solid objects. But everyone believes that she's seeing things.
92	4	"The Fifth Man"	Peter DeLuise	Joseph Mallozzi & Paul Mullie	July 20, 2001
O'Neill remains on a planet designated P7S-441 to protect Lieutenant Tyler, a fifth member of SG-1 whom only the other members of SG-1 can recall. Back on Earth, Hammond informs the team that Tyler doesn't even exist while Col. Simmons returns, seeking to shut the SGC down, citing the latest alien mind games as a possible safety risk.
93	5	"Red Sky"	Martin Wood	Ron Wilkerson	July 27, 2001
SG-1 travel to K'Tau (P39-865) and discovers that the sun has been shifted to the infrared end of the spectrum. All life on the planet is doomed, and SG-1 are responsible. The planet's inhabitants are Norse people and worship the Asgard, and believe that the reddening sky is a sign from their Gods. In reality, the event is a solar reaction caused by SG-1's wormhole that spells death for the planet and its people.
94	6	"Rite of Passage"	Peter DeLuise	Heather E. Ash	August 3, 2001
Dr. Fraiser's adopted daughter, Cassandra, enters puberty and begins developing telekinetic abilities, but the strain of producing so much energy is causing multiple organ failure. Fraiser and SG-1 fear that they might not be able to stop the life-threatening changes caused by Goa'uld Nirrti's genetic experiments.
95	7	"Beast of Burden"	Martin Wood	Peter DeLuise	August 10, 2001
Chaka, the Unas whom Dr. Jackson befriended, has been kidnapped and taken to a planet where humans use Unases as slaves. On a rescue mission, Jackson is risking not only SG-1's safety but also an age-old system.
96	8	"The Tomb"	Peter DeLuise	Joseph Mallozzi & Paul Mullie	August 17, 2001
SG-1 gets trapped in an ancient ziggurat on P2X-338 along with a Russian team. Here they discover the remains of the original Russian team who had gone missing and there's also a Goa'uld on the loose, one who's willing to kill and inhabit anyone it wants with the sole intention of escaping.
97	9	"Between Two Fires"	William Gereghty	Ron Wilkerson	August 24, 2001
The Tollan, in a highly unusual change of policy, agree to share advanced technology with Earth but Carter's friend, Narim, warns that this might spell great danger for Earth.
98	10	"2001"	Peter DeLuise	Brad Wright	August 31, 2001
SG-1 visits an agricultural planet (P3A-194) inhabited by the Volians, who introduce them to their more technologically advanced allies, the Aschen, who propose an alliance with Earth. After Daniel Jackson and Teal'c discover the Aschen's world to be the gate address they forbade themselves from dialing ("2010"), Earth severs all contact with the Aschen.
99	11	"Desperate Measures"	William Gereghty	Joseph Mallozzi & Paul Mullie	September 7, 2001
Carter is kidnapped by a dying millionaire, forcing O'Neill to team up with Harry Maybourne in order to find her.
100	12	"Wormhole X-Treme!"	Peter DeLuise	Story by : Brad Wright, Joseph Mallozzi & Paul Mullie; Teleplay by : Joseph Mallozzi & Paul Mullie	September 14, 2001
When Stargate Command learns of a television show whose premise closely resembles its operations, SG-1 investigates. They find that an alien named Martin Lloyd ("Point of No Return") is giving the producers their ideas.
101	13	"Proving Ground"	Andy Mikita	Ron Wilkerson	March 8, 2002
SG-1 is running training simulations for a group of new recruits. Things begin to get more serious when aliens invade.
102	14	"48 Hours"	Peter F. Woeste	Robert C. Cooper	March 15, 2002
On P3X-116, SG-1 comes under fire from Tanith. Teal'c shoots down Tanith's Al'kesh, and the ship crashes into the Stargate as Teal'c is in transit to Earth. Teal'c does not rematerialize but his pattern is stuck in the Earth-side gate. With a deadline of 48 hours, SG-1 must find a way to save Teal'c before he is lost forever. As Daniel and Major Paul Davis attempt to make a deal with the Russians, O'Neill finds himself forming an unlikely partnership with rogue agent Harry Maybourne as General Hammond deals with Colonel Frank Simmons. Carter finds herself collaborating with the obnoxious Dr. Rodney McKay (David Hewlett), the world's foremost expert on the Stargate, who has already decided that trying to save Teal'c is a waste of time.
103	15 (Note: Sky One aired "Fail Safe" before "Summit" and "Last Stand", although "Fail Safe" follows the two-parter plotwise. Showtime aired the episodes in the right order. The episode order was also correct on DVDs.)	"**Summit**"	Martin Wood	Joseph Mallozzi & Paul Mullie	March 22, 2002
There is a truce among the Goa'uld and the System Lords meet on a heavily guarded space station. The Tok'ra plan to kill them all, but require a human who can speak fluent Goa'uld and Daniel is the only qualified candidate. The Tok'ra create a version of the Reol chemical ("The Fifth Man") for the undercover mission. Meanwhile, Anubis attacks an outpost of Kali on the planet Cerador, destroying two motherships. Lord Zipacna, under orders from Anubis, attacks Revanna, the site of the main Tok'ra base after Vorash.
104	16	"**Last Stand**"	Martin Wood	Robert C. Cooper	March 29, 2002
A powerful System Lord shows himself for the first time in a thousand years and offers to destroy the Tau'ri and Tok'ra. Meanwhile, SG-1 and Lt. Elliot/Lantash are trying to escape the Tok'ra base.
105	17	"Fail Safe"	Andy Mikita	Joseph Mallozzi & Paul Mullie	April 5, 2002
An amateur astronomer discovers a rogue asteroid on a collision course with Earth. SG-1 and a couple of engineers repair the cargoship that crashed on Revanna and head for Earth. Just before they reach the asteroid, there is a problem with one of the engines. They start heading for the asteroid, but manage to stop at the last moment. Teal'c and O'Neill place a naquadah enhanced nuclear weapon. Carter discovers that the core of the asteroid is composed of naquadah, so exploding the nuke would destroy Earth. They manage to use the ship's hyperspace engines to transfer the asteroid to the other side of Earth.
106	18	"The Warrior"	Peter DeLuise	Story by : Christopher Judge; Teleplay by : Peter DeLuise	April 12, 2002
The Jaffa rebellion has a new leader named K'tano, who seems almost too good to be true. SG-1 visits K'tano's Jaffa camp on the planet Cal Mah (meaning "sanctuary") to negotiate an alliance. However, K'tano sends rebel Jaffa on a suicide mission to a stronghold under the control of Nirrti, and when K'tano sends Teal'c on a suicide mission against the Goa'uld system lord Yu, he finds that the new leader isn't what he seems.
107	19	"Menace"	Martin Wood	Story by : James Tichenor; Teleplay by : Peter DeLuise	April 26, 2002
The team finds an android that somehow managed to survive a Replicator attack. They learn she is the mother of all Replicators, but has the mentality of a young child. Danielle Nicolet guest stars as Reese.
108	20	"The Sentinel"	Peter DeLuise	Ron Wilkerson	May 3, 2002
The Latonans are a once-advanced race that abandoned technology to focus on mental development. Their homeworld Latona (P2A-018) is defended by a 500-year-old device called the Sentinel, which was inadvertently deactivated by rogue NID operatives seeking to reverse-engineer it. With Latona being invaded by the Goa'uld Svarog, SG-1 brings the NID agents with them to repair the Sentinel and save the Latonans from the Goa'uld.
109	21	"Meridian"	William Waring	Robert C. Cooper	May 10, 2002
Daniel incurs lethal radiation exposure when he prevents a potentially cataclysmic accident in a weapons laboratory on the planet Langara (P9Y-4C3), but the mysterious Oma Desala shows him that death can simply be another beginning. While the alien government responsible for the lab accuses him of attempting to sabotage their research, the Kelownan Jonas Quinn tries to negotiate with SG-1.
110	22	"Revelations"	Martin Wood	Joseph Mallozzi & Paul Mullie	May 17, 2002
As Jack, Sam and Teal'c struggle to come to terms with losing Daniel, an Asgard scientist Heimdall is stranded on Adara II, a planet under attack by the Goa'uld. As the Asgard have no spare ships, they ask Stargate Command, particularly SG-1 to help, using their salvaged Goa'uld cargo ship. Anubis is finally revealed.

== Home media ==
DVD name	Region 1	Region 2	Region 4
Stargate SG-1 Season 5	January 20, 2004	April 28, 2003	November 17, 2004
Volume 20	—	April 22, 2002	—
Volume 21	—	May 20, 2002	—
Volume 22	—	June 24, 2002	—
Volume 23	—	July 22, 2002	—
Volume 24	—	August 26, 2002	—
Volume 25	—	September 23, 2002	—
