= Jonas Quinn =

Fictional character from the Stargate franchise

- Corin Nemec as Jonas Quinn in a promotional photo for Stargate SG-1 Season 6.
- First appearance: "Meridian" (SG-1)
- Last appearance: "Fallout" (SG-1)
- Portrayed by: Corin Nemec

In-universe information
- Species: Human from Langara

Jonas Quinn is a fictional character in the Canadian-American television series Stargate SG-1, a science fiction show about a military team exploring the galaxy via a network of alien transportation devices. Played by Corin Nemec, Jonas is introduced in the season 5 episode "Meridian." Jonas fills Daniel Jackson's empty spot on the SG-1 team in season 6 and the beginning of season 7, and last appears in the mid-season 7 episode "Fallout".

Nemec's character replaced Daniel Jackson (portrayed by Michael Shanks) during season 6 after Shanks had left the show amid controversy after season 5. The producers based Jonas' motivation to join Stargate Command on his momentary reluctance to actively prevent Daniel's death, and his feelings of responsibility afterwards. Jonas was slowly integrated into the story in a prolonged transition stage over the first half of season 6. Nemec was open to continue playing Jonas Quinn after season 6, but a new contract was reached with Michael Shanks for Daniel to return in season 7. The role of Jonas was reduced to recurring status in season 7.

== Role in Stargate SG-1 ==
=== Character arc ===
Jonas Quinn is introduced in the season 5 episode "Meridian" as a scientist of the human nation of Kelowna on Langara, a planet with an industrial level comparable to Earth of the 1940s, and that is also locked in a cold war with two rival states. He is an exceptionally quick learner, which becomes useful in memorizing SG mission reports and earth culture. The Kelownans are experimenting with naqahdriah (an unstable but extremely powerful native element related to naqahdah) to build a bomb against their two rival nations, Terrania and the Andari Federation. Jonas is present when SG-1 team member Daniel Jackson gets radiation-poisoned with naqahdriah in an attempt to prevent a catastrophe in Kelowna, but when the Kelownan leaders respond with indifference to Daniel's imminent death and glee with regards to the destructive power of the naqahdriah, Jonas steals a small amount of naqahdriah and offers it to Earth for more peaceful uses. Still wracked by guilt in the season 6 premiere "Redemption" over his hesitation to step in, Jonas helps Major Samantha Carter find a solution to save Earth from an attack by the Goa'uld Anubis. Although Colonel Jack O'Neill is reluctant to add a new fourth member to SG-1, he allows Jonas to join the team, partly to prevent a Russian from being assigned.

After several missions with SG-1, Jonas is confronted with his past in "Shadow Play" and learns more of the effects of naqahdriah on people. In "Metamorphosis", the Goa'uld Nirrti learns via an Ancient DNA Resequencer that Jonas is different from other humans, but she is killed before this is further investigated. In "Prophecy", Nirrti's experiments cause clairvoyant visions in Jonas, and the doctors remove a potentially lethal tumor from his brain. After SG-1 finds the de-ascended Daniel on another planet in the season 7 premiere "Fallen"/"Homecoming", Jonas and Daniel join forces and succeed in driving Anubis away from Kelowna. The three Langaran nations agree to meet for peace talks for the greater good of the planet, and Jonas decides to become a peace negotiator for his people. While Jonas returns to his planet, Daniel rejoins SG-1. Jonas last appears in season 7's "Fallout" to ask Earth for help saving his homeworld from the destructive powers of naqahdriah in the planet's core. Season 10's "Counterstrike" mentions that the Ori conquered Langara, Jonas's homeworld. Langara's story arc is resumed in Stargate Universe's "Seizure", where Earth eventually agrees to protect Langara from the Lucian Alliance, while the Langarans remove the Stargate from their facility.

=== Characterization and relationships ===
After Daniel's death and Jonas' subsequent move to Earth, Major Carter is the SG-1 team member around whom Jonas Quinn feels most comfortable. Nevertheless, Amanda Tapping (Carter) felt that "there is a hesitancy on [Carter]'s part to be too familiar with Jonas [or] make this big emotional investment" in him because he is not Daniel. Jonas hopes that Carter and the alien SG-1 member Teal'c can persuade Colonel O'Neill to give him a chance to prove himself worthy of a place on the SG-1 team, but according to Richard Dean Anderson (O'Neill), "O'Neill feels that Jonas is directly responsible for the demise or at least the damaging of Daniel Jackson [and thus] harbors some resentment towards Jonas". Although O'Neill is suspicious of aliens in general (except of Teal'c), O'Neill begins to accept Jonas at the end of "Redemption" yet finds it hard to ever significantly warm up to Jonas, something which Nemec felt "makes things much more interesting". Tapping added that Jonas inadvertently brings the three remaining SG-1 members closer together again. Jonas's "easy-going nature" later helps him to also establish relationships with the supporting characters Dr. Janet Fraiser and General George Hammond, whom Nemec regarded "very much [as] a father figure in Jonas's eyes".

== Conceptual history ==
When actor Michael Shanks (Daniel Jackson) announced his decision to leave Stargate SG-1 at the end of season 5 for concerns over being under-utilized, the Sci Fi Channel wanted to fill the void with a new character for season 6. Corin Nemec happened to be at the courtyard of Metro-Goldwyn-Mayer's Santa Monica offices rehearsing audition dialog for an independent film when some casting agents recognized him from previous projects. They briefly mentioned Stargate SG-1 to him and informed Nemec's manager of their strong interest in him the same afternoon. Although Nemec was familiar with the Stargate film, he had never watched the television show and was sent videotapes to familiarize himself with the series. Nemec was cast for the penultimate season 5 episode "Meridian" after several more meetings, but both sides agreed to await the character's look on film before deciding on a long-term involvement.

Producer Brad Wright announced in September 2001 that an actor had been cast and that the new character would be someone whom fans would recognize. An MGM Sci-Fi newsletter revealed Corin Nemec to play the role of Liander [sic] Quinn in "Meridian" in November 2001, fueling fan speculation of the identity of the new character. Soon afterwards, producer Joseph Mallozzi revealed that Nemec's character appears in the first five episodes of season 6. Meanwhile, Nemec started to work out six days a week in-between seasons and gained about 25 pounds (11 kg) to look bigger around the tall SG-1 cast.

Mallozzi stated before the airing of season 6 that "Jonas will bring a unique alien perspective and ability to the team [that] will allow him to contribute in areas of expertise usually owned by [Carter] and Daniel." Brad Wright hoped that "what Corin, as Jonas, will bring to the show is a renewed sense of amazement" of traveling around the galaxy although older characters have grown accustomed to it. The season 6 opening two-parter "Redemption" intended to establish Jonas as a team player who can contribute ideas, although writer Robert C. Cooper felt the need to acknowledge and not "trivialize what the [Daniel Jackson] character meant to the team and to the show for five seasons". The writers incorporated the initial viewer resistance to the change by making O'Neill the most resistant to Jonas' presence, allowing viewers to grieve Daniel and gradually come to terms with his absence. The producers based Jonas' motivation to join SG-1 on his former reluctance to shut off the machine that indirectly killed Daniel, and his feelings of responsibility for Daniel's death. Jonas was slowly integrated into the story in a prolonged transition stage over the first half of season 6.

Nemec was open to continue playing Jonas Quinn after season 6 or in a feature film or a spin-off series, but a new contract was reached with Michael Shanks for Daniel to return in season 7. The role of Jonas was therefore reduced to recurring status in season 7. Nemec welcomed the producers' openness for story pitches and offered several story ideas. He wrote the mid-season-7 episode "Fallout" and considered pitching more stories afterwards, but he became busy with other projects. Jonas is seldom mentioned in the series after this point but after Season 10's "Counterstrike" stated that the Ori conquered Jonas' homeworld, Stargate producer Joseph Mallozzi said in his blog that "in [his] mind, Jonas went underground and is still alive somewhere, resisting the Ori army."

== Reception ==
The audience reception of Jonas Quinn was sparked with controversy over Michael Shanks' departure from the show. When rumors began late in 2001 that Showtime would also not be renewing Stargate SG-1 after its fifth season, panicking fans rallied to save the show and Daniel's character, starting massive write-in campaigns and setting up websites such as the "Save Daniel Jackson" site. The SciFi Channel eventually ordered a sixth season of the show, but the character of Jonas continued to be distrusted by loyal fans, who were concerned that Daniel's death might cause the SG-1 team to lose its moral compass. Robert C. Cooper summarized that "there's been quite a bit of ire directed by fans towards Daniel's replacement" after the airing of "Meridian", but he hoped that the character would grow on fans eventually. Producer Joseph Mallozzi claimed at the beginning of season 6 to still get the "odd incoherent rambling death threat passed along to me from the [Save Daniel Jackson] site".

Amanda Tapping admitted that it had been easier to establish relationships with her co-stars at the beginning of the series, comparing Nemec's situation to "being the new kid in school; we're still trying to make [Corin] comfortable, but it's not the same". Nevertheless, the Stargate SG-1 actors and producers complimented Corin Nemec and the character. Richard Dean Anderson was impressed with Nemec's performance in "Meridian", saying "he really struck me as a bright guy, very respectful of the dynamic of the set, but with an awareness of what he wanted to bring." Don S. Davis (General Hammond) noted during the filming of season 6 that "Corin is a wonderful [and well-liked] young man with a tremendous personality and he's had a great deal of experience in the business", agreeing with writer Robert C. Cooper that Nemec had done a "fine" and "wonderful" job.

TV Zone's Jan Vincent-Rudzki expected Jonas to be "pushed out of the way" in season 7's "Fallen"/"Homecoming", but considered the character's departure as "keeping with previous events" and "quite plausible". The writers' decision to team up Jonas with Daniel for a significant part of the two-part episode "gives credence to Jonas's exit", although "it's a great shame that this new 'partnership' couldn't have continued" since "the two [characters] worked so well together". Nemec stated in a 2008 interview that "the initial backlash from a very small core, outspoken group of the fandom had a bit of a volatile reaction to it, which is totally natural... I'd say 95-plus percent of the fan base grew to like the character and accepted the character overall. Especially by the time season 6 ended, I think people were pretty much, 'Eh, OK — I'm cool with that.' For the most part."
