= Wormhole X-Treme! =

- Stargate SG-1 episode
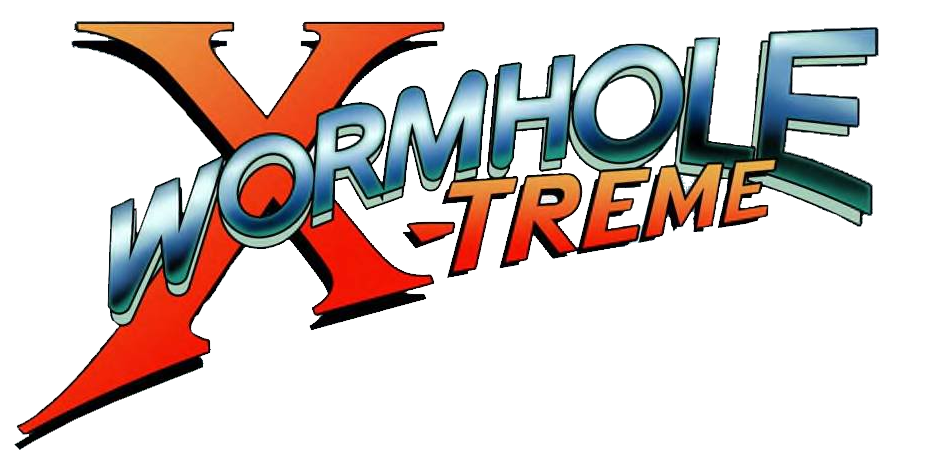
- Episode no.: Season 5 Episode 12
- Directed by: Peter DeLuise
- Written by: Brad Wright, Joseph Mallozzi and Paul Mullie
- Cinematography by: Peter F. Woeste
- Editing by: Allan Lee
- Original air date: September 8, 2001

Guest appearances
- Teryl Rothery as Janet Fraiser; Willie Garson as Martin Lloyd; Michael DeLuise as Nick Marlowe; Jill Teed as Yolanda Reese; Robert Lewis as Tanner; Christian Bocher as Raymond Gunne; Herbert Duncanson as Douglas Anders; Peter Flemming as Agent Malcolm Barrett

Episode chronology
| ← Previous "Desperate Measures" | Next → "Proving Ground" |
- Stargate SG-1 (season 5)

"Wormhole X-Treme!" is the 100th episode of military science fiction adventure television show Stargate SG-1 and is the 12th episode of the fifth season. The episode was first broadcast September 8, 2001 on Showtime in the United States. It was written by series co-creator and executive producer Brad Wright along with supervising producers Joseph Mallozzi and Paul Mullie and was directed by Peter DeLuise.

In the episode, Stargate Command learns that an alien ship belonging to the same race as Martin Lloyd is heading for Earth. They locate Martin, who having once again lost his memories has created a television series called Wormhole X-Treme!, seemingly based upon the top secret Stargate Program.

The story centres around a show-within-a-show called Wormhole X-Treme! which parodies Stargate SG-1. In creating the episode, Wright and all those involved sought to create a comedic episode that celebrated the show through parody, cameo appearances, inside and metafictional jokes and references. The episode is a sequel to "Point of No Return" from the show's fourth season. The season ten episode "200" follows up on characters and events from the episode.

== Plot ==
An alien space ship has been detected heading towards Earth, and based upon its energy signature Major Samantha Carter (Amanda Tapping) believes that it belongs to the same species of people as Martin Lloyd, who Stargate Command set about locating. They find Martin, who has become the creative consultant on a science fiction television show he sold called Wormhole X-Treme!, which bears a striking resemblance to the real life top secret Stargate Program. Under the guise of being the shows Air Force consultant, Colonel Jack O'Neill (Richard Dean Anderson) is sent to the studio where Martin is working on the show in order to learn what he can from him about the inbound ship. O'Neill reintroduces himself to Martin (Willie Garson), who despite having previously met, claims not to remember him.

Believing that Martin has once again had his memory erased, O'Neill searches his trailer and uncovers numerous vitamins, which he relays back to General Hammond (Don S. Davis) at Stargate Command, who dispatches the rest of SG-1 to assist. Soon Dr. Fraiser (Teryl Rothery) determines that the vitamins found contain the chemical used by Tanner, another member of Martin's race who was previously responsible for drugging him. Meanwhile, Carter and Dr. Daniel Jackson (Michael Shanks) establish that, also like last time, surveillance devices have been setup around Martin's house. After their attempt to apprehend one of Tanner's men fails, Carter and Daniel's lead takes them to a warehouse filled with government agents.

O'Neill and Martin are captured by Tanner (Robert Lewis) and his men, who administer Martin with an antidote to restore his memories. As his memories return, he tells O'Neill that he drugged himself in order to forget everything that had happened to him. The pair are soon freed by Teal'c (Christopher Judge) and Martin realizes that he needs to help Tanner's group escape Earth by getting the remote device for their ship. Meanwhile NID Agent Barrett (Peter Flemming), whose men have apprehended Carter and Daniel, tells them that they plan on seizing the space ship, and soon receive a tip as to Martin's whereabouts. With Barrett gone, Carter and Daniel overpower the remaining NID agents and contact O'Neill warning him that the NID are on their way. O'Neill procures the device and Tanner persuades him to relinquish it to they can flee Earth and the NID. Content with his new life, Martin decides to stay on Earth and Tanner and his men teleport to the ship before the NID can get to them.

== Production ==
=== Development ===
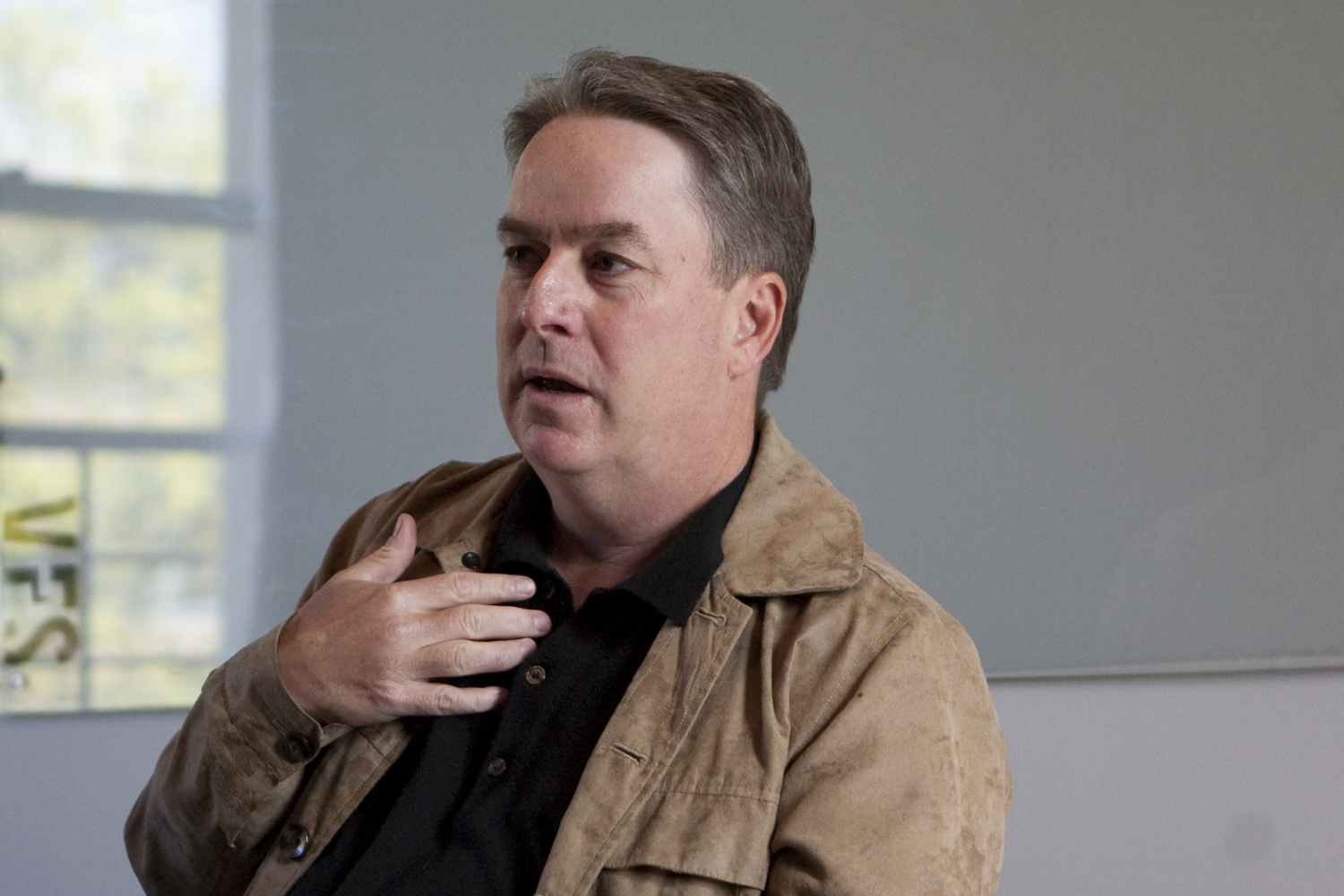
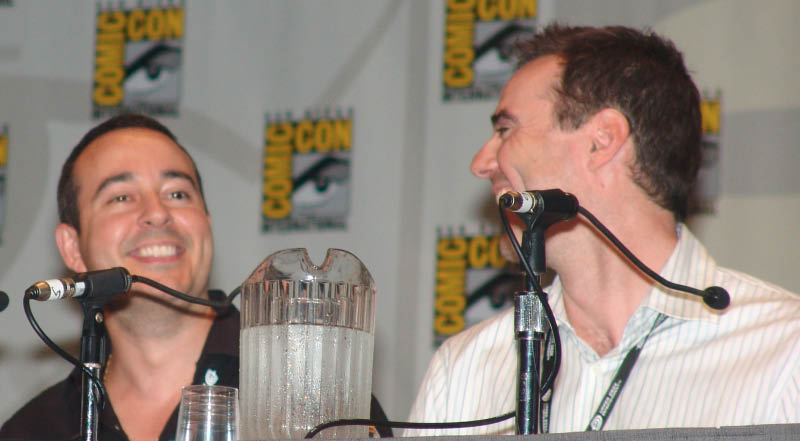
Brad Wright (top) co-wrote the episode with Joseph Mallozzi (bottom left) & Paul Mullie (bottom right).

The initial idea for the story came from series co-creator and executive producer Brad Wright. He imagined the character of Martin Lloyd, who had previously appeared in the season four episode "Point of No Return" as having once again lost his memory, leading him to make a television series like SG-1. According to Wright, the story "was something I would never have done in a million years unless it was the one-hundredth episode". After Wright had outlined the story, writing duo Joseph Mallozzi & Paul Mullie were assigned to pen the script, although they initially thought Wright was joking when he pitched them the story. Wright believed one of the things fans found attractive in Stargate SG-1 was that the show didn't take itself "too seriously". Instead of a typical episode, the writers looked to produce a more comedic story, celebrating the milestone. The 1999 Science fiction comedy film Galaxy Quest enthused Wright and the shows writers to instead craft a story that parodied Stargate SG-1.

In developing their script, Mullie found that they had no shortage of jokes, however "The hard part was finding an excuse for the humour to happen". Mullie wanted to ensure the episode still meant something and had "an actual Stargate story underneath all of the parody". Once the shows production team found out about the nature of the episode, Mallozzi recalled "So many people wanted to add so much", and would pitch them material. As writing progressed it was the idea that Martin Lloyd had purposely decided to erase his own memory which "made certain events fall into place" for Mallozzi and Mullie.

There were conversations about how far to push the parody elements of the episode. Visual effects supervisor James Tichnor had hoped they would also be able to include "corny" computer generated effects, citing the invading spaceships in the film Mars Attacks! as an idea, however Wright still wanted to maintain a level of realism within the episode. The visual effects team were able to include some smaller scale gags, such as paying homage to the original Star Trek transporter effect at the end of the episode.

=== Writing ===
Events that had taken place both on and off screen in the show and its production helped inform numerous scenes. Peter Deluise's earlier directorial decision to ask the props master to "Make the kiwi look alien", suggesting they be painted red during the production of "Beneath the Surface", was written directly into "Wormhole X-Treme!" Another choice by DeLuise to have Jack O'Neill kill what he was later told was "too many Jaffa" and then step over their dead bodies in the episode "The Fifth Man" informed having Danning/Marlowe's struggle to navigate a kissing scene whilst surrounded by dead bodies. The president of MGM Television, Hank Cohen, was also mocked for his advocacy that the show introduce a "sexy" female alien character, which ultimately took the form of Anise portrayed by actress Vanessa Angel. Mullie felt that the character "didn't quite work out" and as "a dig at him" he wrote that an executive would make the same suggestion. Cohen was ultimately given a cameo in the episode, delivering the line. Mullie had neither expected the joke to remain in the episode, nor for Cohen to be the one who delivered it.

The writers also took aim at other elements of Stargate and science fiction in general storytelling. The recurring Goa'uld weapon, the Zat'nik'tel, which Mallozzi described as weapon of "connivence" and used the opportunity to lampoon its ability to disintegrate targets upon the third shot. Additionally, during filming, DeLuise had the Wormhole X-Treme! team perform what the shows production mockingly referred to as the "jerky" or "twitchy" dance after being shot, something that the main cast of SG-1 had become reluctant to do after being "zatted" as the show progressed over the years. The science fiction trope of characters being out of phase was also made fun of, as were the SG-1 conceits of everyone speaking English and having the same concept of time as Earth.

Some scenes and ideas were dropped during development. This included Wright's idea for a "huge, knock down, full-on, comically-big fight scene" showing Carter and Daniel's escape from the NID. Wright dropped the scene as he was concerned they were "in danger of going too far" in sending themselves up. A scene referencing the ongoing will-they-won't-they romance between Jack O'Neill and Samantha Carter was also written but ultimately dropped. According to Mallozzi the scene would have involved Martin expressing his desire to have two of his main characters in a relationship, but being unable to do so due to their position in the military - mirroring the O'Neill/Carter relationship. O'Neill would have gone on to reference the events of the SG-1 episode "Beneath the Surface", with Martin responding: "I can’t do that! That’s a Voyager episode!"

=== Cast and characters ===
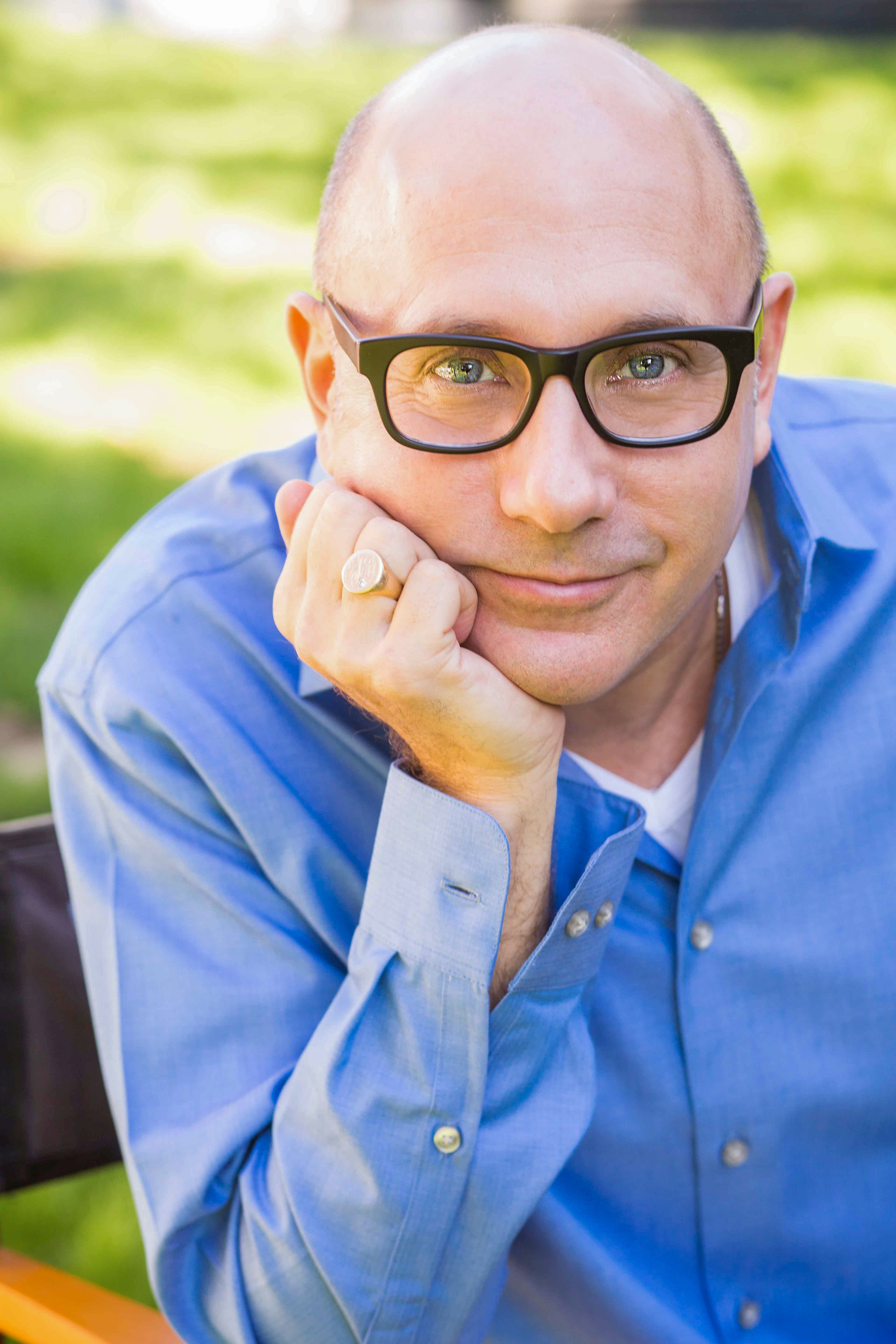
Willie Garson returned to the show as alien refugee Martin Lloyd.

Willie Garson returns as the alien refugee Martin Lloyd, first introduced in "Point of No Return". Robert Lewis and Mar Andersons reprise their roles from "Point of No Return" as the alien refugees hiding on Earth, Dr. Peter Tanner and Bob. Matthew Bennett who had previously portrayed one of the alien refugees was unable to return.

The character of Nick Marlowe, who portrays Colonel Danning in Wormhole X-Treme! was originally based on Richard Dean Anderson's Stargate SG-1 character Colonel Jack O'Neill. The part of Marlowe/Danning was first offered to Jeff Probst and then to Robert Hays. After being unable to secure either actor, the part was opened up to auditions, before Brad Wright suggested Michael DeLuise, brother of Peter DeLuise. After accepting the part, Michael was sent a tape of Richard Dean Anderson's work on the show; however, Michael with the support of director Peter, instead looked to the performances of William Shatner and his depiction of Captain James Kirk from Star Trek for inspiration. As well as imbuing the character with "Shatnerisms," Michael sought to portray Danning as an "over-the-top TV hero" and Marlowe as a "pissy, self-absorbed actor". For the role, Michael DeLuise's hair was dyed slightly grey and two cuts were made into his right eyebrow as homage to the single slit in O'Neill's.

Christopher Judge's stand-in Herbert Duncanson was cast as Douglas Anders, who portrays Grell the Robot within Wormhole X-Treme!, a parody of the character of Teal'c. Jill Teed was cast in the role of Yolanda Reese, who portrays the character of Stacy Monroe in Wormhole X-Treme!, a parody of Samantha Carter. According to Peter DeLuise, Teed had "come so close on so many different parts and this time around we thought, We have to have her in this story." Christian Boucher was selected to parody Dr. Daniel Jackson, portraying the character of Raymond Gunne who plays Dr. Levant in Wormhole X-Treme!. Boucher had previously portrayed the character Major Dean Newman in the episode "Shades of Grey", and would go on to guest star as a character called Torrell in the episode "Condemned" of spinoff series Stargate Atlantis. The episode marks the first appearance of Agent Malcolm Barrett portrayed by Peter Flemming, who would go on to make numerous appearances on both SG-1 and Stargate Atlantis. Flemming gave a quick, two line audition for the part, which at the time was called 'Man in Black' with the possibility of becoming recurring. Benjamin Immanuel, Don Thompson, Laura Drummond, Kiara Hunter and Keath Thome respectively play the parts of Producer, Props Guy, Security Guard, Alien Princess and Head SF.

Many of the shows production staff guest or cameo within the episode as the fictional crew of Wormhole X-treme!. Director Peter DeLuise portrays a fictional version of himself - the director of Wormhole X-Treme! and property master David Sinclair portrays Bill the assistant director. Cameos include writers Brad Wright, Robert C. Cooper, Joseph Mallozzi and Ron Wilkerson. Executive producer Michael Greenburg, his wife actress Nikki Smook, co-executive producer N. John Smith and production manager Andy Mikita all also appear. Other cameos include visual effects supervisor Michelle Comens, senior digital compositing artist Bruce Woloshyn, makeup artist Jan Newman, 3rd assistant director Gisela Schulte, property master Kenny Gibbs. Series director Martin Wood portrays a NID agent.

=== Filming ===
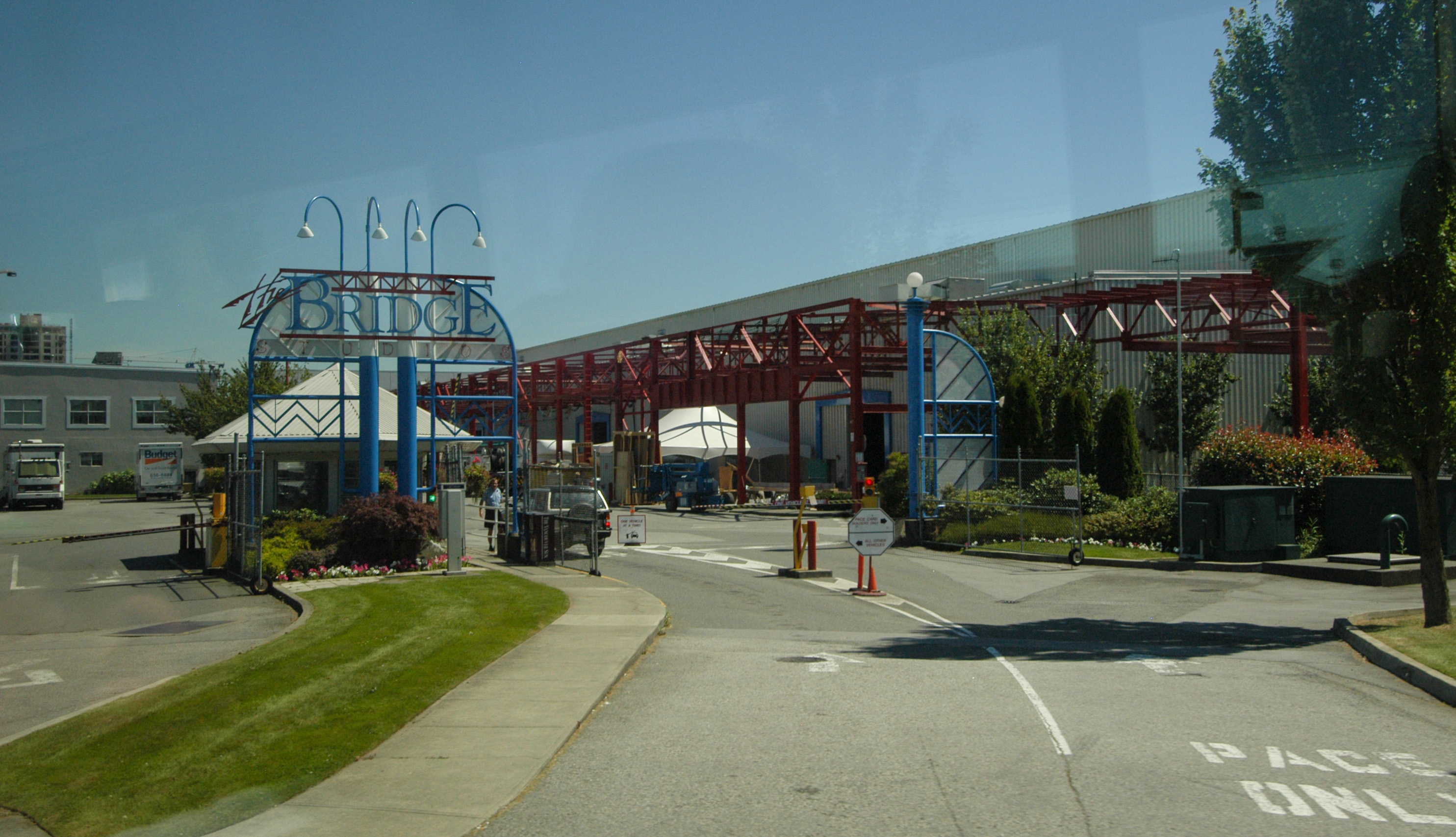
Much of the episode was filmed in and around The Bridge Studios in Burnaby, British Columbia.

Peter DeLuise directed the episode, whilst Peter Woeste oversaw cinematography. The shows standing Stargate Command set at The Bridge Studios in Burnaby, British Columbia was used for filming, whilst Bridge Studios itself was featured throughout as the movie studio where the fictional Wormhole X-Treme! is filmed. The production team originally considered digitally altering the Bridge Studios signage to show the Wormhole X-Treme! branding, but ultimately dropped the idea. DeLuise opted to fill the Bridge backlot with as many easter eggs as he could, including props from Stargate SG-1 such as the Asgard puppet and a Goa'uld Death Glider model. He also looked to Disneyfy the backlot, hoping to give it a "'circus-type' atmosphere" and make it far more colourful and alive through having crew everywhere, added set dressing and saturating the scenes in post-production.

An incomplete set for a Goa'uld space station interior, which was being constructed for the then upcoming Stargate SG-1 two-parter "Summit"/"Last Stand" ended up being used by DeLuise in the episode as a set for the show-within-a-show, Wormhole X-Treme!. The Zephyr Mercury building on Boundary Road was used for the O'Neill, Matin and Tanner interrogation scene. For the warehouse being used by the NID, production took over a car dealership across the street from Bridge Studios, whilst the frequently used Richmond Sand Dunes features as the final location of the episode.

During filming, DeLuise realised they would not have enough usable material to make the required episode length. In considering what else could be added, DeLuise thought of his father, Dom DeLuise, and how many of his films had bloopers at the end. Although usually resistant to bloopers, DeLuise convinced Brad Wright to include a "making of Wormhole X-Treme!" segment to end the episode, combining fake bloopers and interviews with the cast of the show-within-the-show. Under DeLuise and Wright's guidance, Michael DeLuise, Teed, Duncanson and Bocher recorded some two hours of additional and largely unscripted and improvisational material. Peter DeLuise's director's cut of the episode featured real bloopers of the Stargate SG-1 cast that was ultimately omitted from the broadcast and home release versions. Additionally, a scene involving Teal'c watching the trailer for Wormhole X-Treme! "laughing uproariously and enjoying the hell out of the show – much to the bewilderment of his fellow team members" was cut by Wright during editing.

== Cultural references ==
One of Tanner's men uses the alias "Steve Austin," a reference to the character of the same name from the 1973 television series The Six Million Dollar Man, which Robert C. Cooper was a fan of. Although "a show about a talking dog who solves crimes" was included in the script, it was Richard Dean Anderson who, as an ad-lib decided to mention the unsold television pilot Poochinski by name. According to DeLuise, the green-skinned Wormhole X-Treme! aliens were an homage to the Orions from Star Trek.

== Release ==
=== Broadcast ===
The episode first aired on September 8, 2001, on Showtime in the United States. The episode was moved from its usual Sunday slot to Saturday night and was preceded by a Stargate SG-1 marathon to mark the hundredth episode. The episode was first syndicated in the week of February 24, 2003 where it received a 2.4 Nielsen rating. In the United Kingdom the episode was first shown on November 21, 2001, on Sky 1.

=== Reception ===
Jan Vincent-Rudzki for TV Zone awarded the episode 10 out of 10, writing "This is witty, well-written, well-directed, with some great in-jokes". Vincent-Rudzki applauded the episode for being "semi-ridiculous and yet still quite dramatic episode", with a "nice story" for non-fans of the show to enjoy. Reviewing for IGN, Daniel Solis called it a "Great, great episode", praising the "side-splittingly accurate" "caricatures" of SG-1. Andy Hall for DVD Times believed the episode was a "great way to mark reaching 100 shows" and that it "hilariously sends up SG-1 and in fact many shows of the genre, by ruthlessly picking plot holes in the concept".

Brian Ford Sullivan for The Futon Critic placed the episode 50th in his "The 50 Best Episodes of 2001" list, calling it "a grand celebration of how good this underappreciated series can be" going on to applaud the episode for delivering "some of the series' best laughs to date". Keith R.A. DeCandido for Tor.com described "Wormhole X-Treme" as "a hilarious hundredth episode that celebrates by making fun of itself", applauding the return of Willie Garson's Martin Lloyd. Reflecting on the episode in 2019, Helen Ashcroft for Screen Rant believed the episode was "one of the most polarizing episodes in the entire show", claiming that "While many hate it, there must be others who agree that it is a light-hearted fun diversion". Writing for Stargate fansite Gateworld, David Read noted "A lot of people don’t consider this episode to be canon".

=== Home media ===
"Wormhole X-Treme!" and the previous related episodes ("Between Two Fires", "2001", and "Desperate Measures") were first released to DVD on June 24, 2002, as part of Stargate SG-1 - Volume 22 in the United Kingdom. On the same day, "Wormhole X-Treme!" and "Desperate Measures" were also released to VHS in the UK as part of volume 5.06. The episode was then released as part of the complete Stargate SG-1 Fifth Season Region 2 DVD on April 28, 2003, in the United Kingdom.

In the United States of America, the episode was first released as part of the complete fifth season region 1 DVD set on January 20, 2004. The DVD releases of the episode include an audio commentary by director and producer Peter DeLuise, writer and producer Joseph Mallozzi and visual effects supervisor James Tichenor.

The episode, along with the rest of the fifth season of Stargate SG-1 were first made available to download on iTunes and Amazon Unbox in December 2007. Along with every other episode of the series, "Wormhole X-Treme!" was made available to stream for the first time through Netflix in the USA on August 15, 2010. The episode, along with the rest of the series has been upscaled for releases on various streaming platforms and the 2020 Blu-ray release. In July 2009, the official Stargate MGM website posted 5 previously unreleased bloopers from the episode.

In September 2001, The Hollywood Reporter included a 18-page feature on Stargate SG-1 reaching its 100th episode. The feature included cast and crew interviews, as well as congratulatory messages from around the entertainment industry.
