= Mythology of Stargate =

Mythology in the Stargate franchise

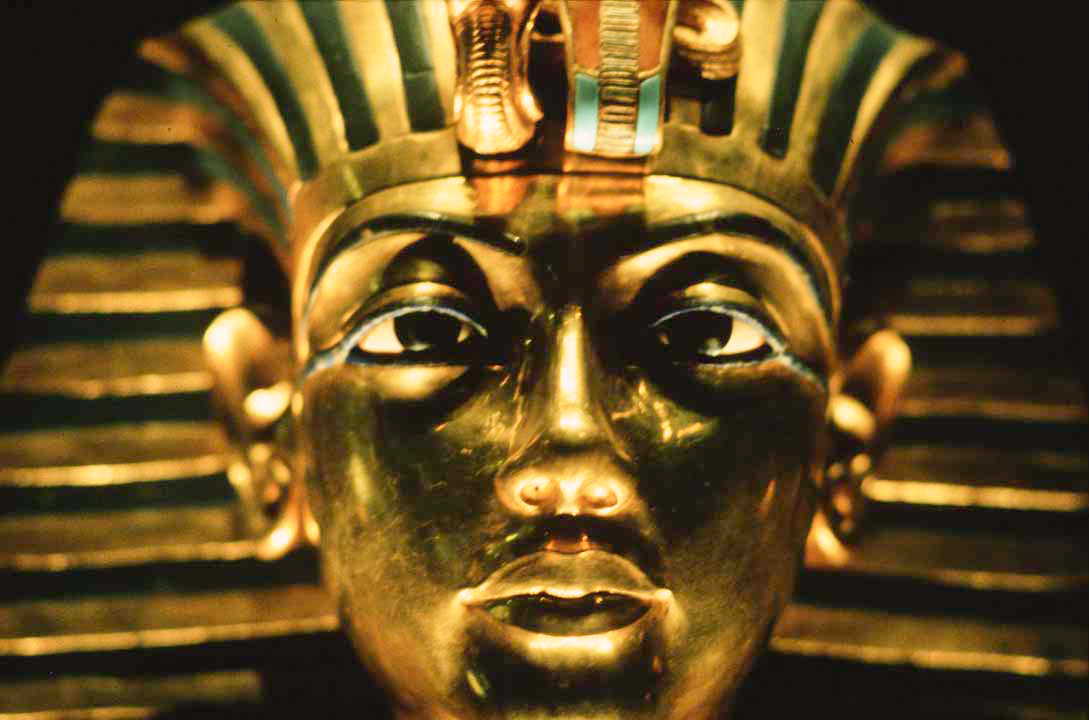
The opening credits of Stargate SG-1's first five seasons show Ra's mask in close-up, which is similar to Tutankhamun's golden mask (pictured).

The mythology of the Stargate franchise is a complex and eclectic fictional backstory, which is presented as being historical, of the Stargate premise. A "rich mythology and world-building" are used to establish "a vast cosmology and an interesting alternate take on the history of Earth"; a defining feature is "its use of ancient mythology, with stories that take inspiration from multiple places around the globe". Narratives center around xeno-mythology as experienced by humans during episodic contact with alien races. Audiences across a variety of platforms - including TV series, novels, comics and movies - witness the people of Earth exploring a fictional universe using the Stargate. Species established early on in the franchise recur throughout, with one adversary often dominating a particular story arc, which can continue across several seasons.

In addition to a diversity of alien life, the Stargate universe includes an abundance of humans who, prior to the events depicted in the various Stargate fictional vehicles, have been scattered across the cosmos by advanced aliens. Some of the most significant species or beings in Stargate SG-1 are the Goa'uld, the Asgard, and the Replicators. Stargate Atlantis, set in the Pegasus Dwarf Irregular Galaxy, introduced the Wraith and the Asurans. One of the most influential species in Stargate, the Ancients, are revealed to have moved on to a higher plane of existence. "There's no shortage of familiar myths to be found in the Stargate franchise, even if they are transformed to fit sci-fi parameters."

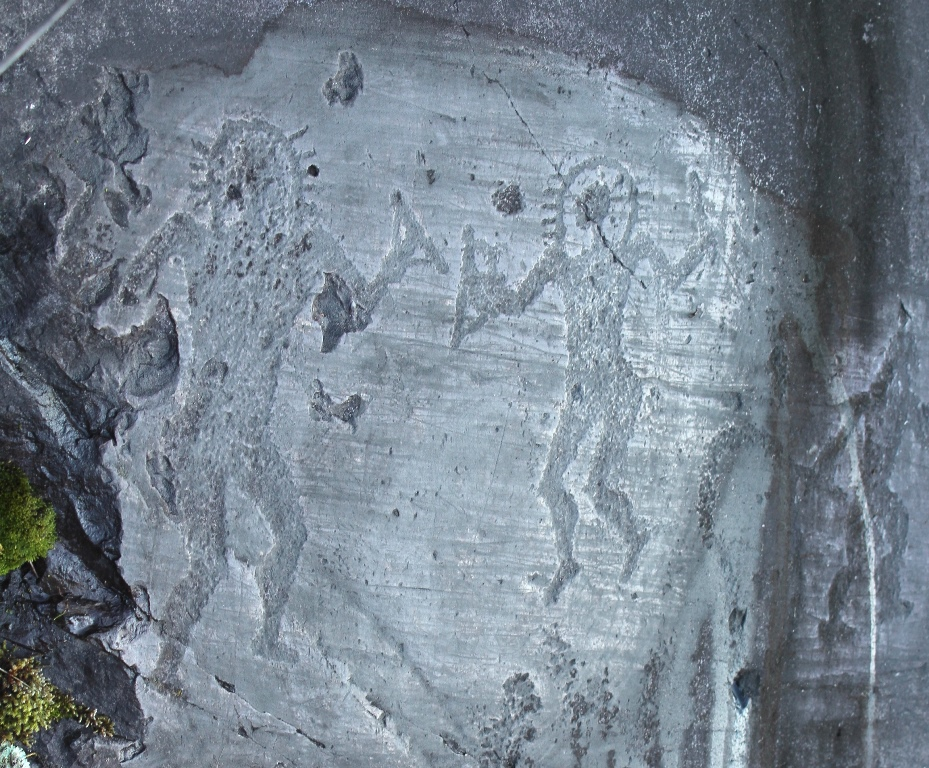
Petroglyphs from Val Camonica, Italy, cited by proponents as evidence of ancient astronauts.

Frederic Krueger notes the re-emergence of the Ancient Astronaut Discourse (AAD) in the 1990s, and points to "the continuous mutual influence between the AAD and popular culture, exemplified via the rather spectacular case of Stargate". For example, an origin theory for human populations shown to inhabit the Milky Way galaxy in Stargate SG-1 holds that the Goa'uld transplanted humans from Earth to other planets for slave labor. Many of these populations were abandoned, often when deposits of the fictional precious mineral naquadah were exhausted, and subsequently developed their own unique societies.

Some of these extraterrestrial human civilizations are shown to have become much more technologically advanced than those on Earth, the in-show rationale being that they never suffered the setback of the Dark Ages. The most advanced of these humans were the Tollan, who were destroyed by the Goa'uld in Season 5's Between Two Fires. Another example of AAD in the mythos is the creation of human populations in the Pegasus galaxy by the Ancients, few of which are technologically advanced, as the Wraith destroy any civilization that could potentially pose a threat. Audiences are also made aware of large numbers of humans in the Ori galaxy, where human worship enhances the power of the Ori.

== Eclectic borrowings ==
Scholars have remarked on the multiple borrowings of real-world mythology to provide Stargate settings. Mariella Scerri and David Zammit note numerous such uses in Stargate.

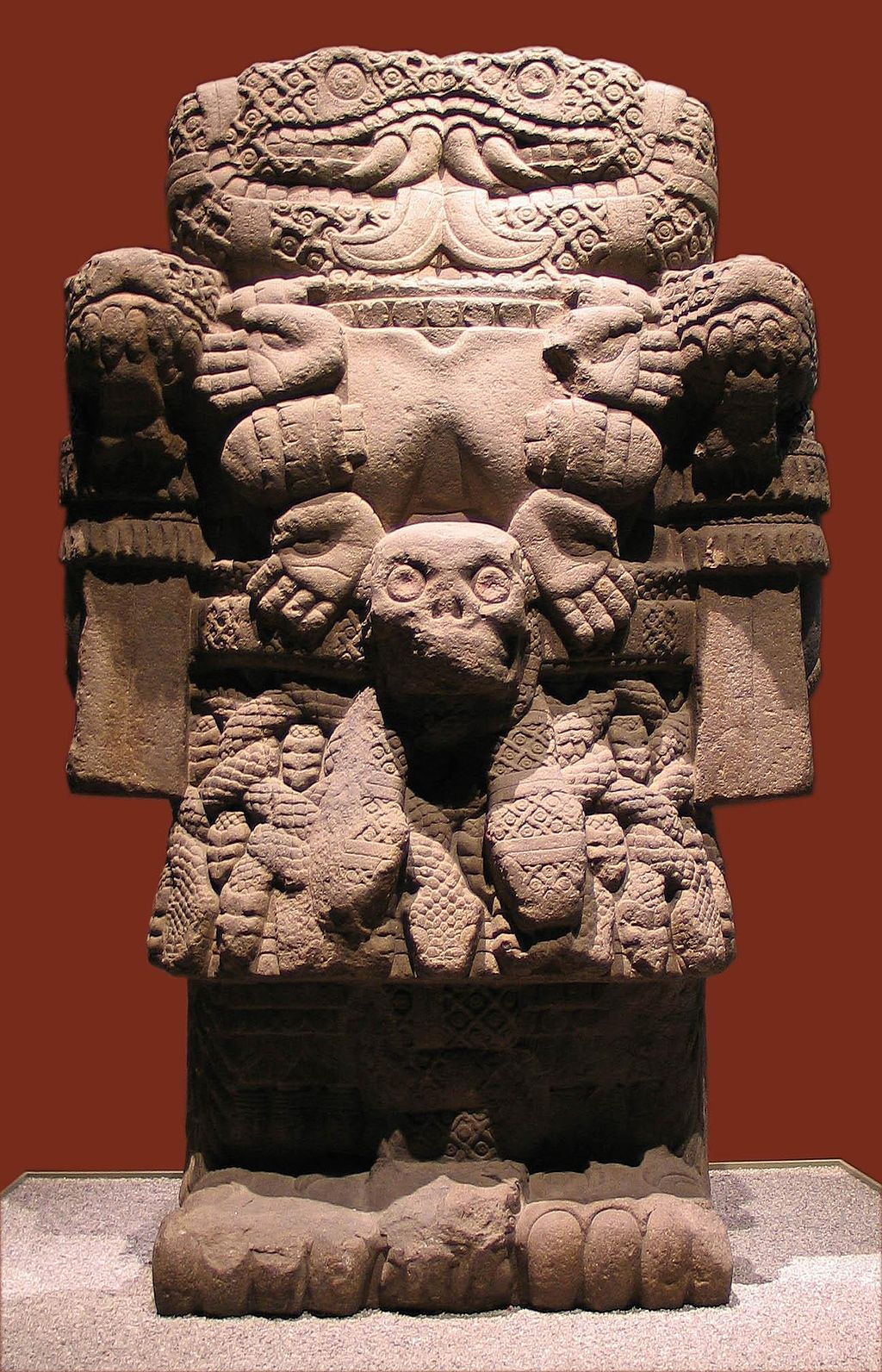
Cōātlīcue bears a "remarkably convenient resemblance" to Stargate's Goa'uld queen Hathor. 15th century statue, Mexico City

Examples from Mariella Scerri and David Zammit's analysis of mythological figures in Stargate
Real world mythology	Figure	Stargate
Ancient Egyptian		"a key aspect of its appeal"
Aztec	Cōātlīcue	"remarkably convenient resemblance" to Goa'uld queen Hathor
Biblical		mentioned in Exogenesis
Ancient Greek	Atlas, king of Atlantis	Moros, leader of Atlantis; possible grudge with Atlas
Sumerian epic Gilgamesh	Ea, "god of primordial waters"	"terraforming engineer" aka creation god, avoiding "potentially delicate marketing issue of using the Judeo-Christian God"

Frederic Krueger analyses the use of Ancient Egyptian mythology, and concludes: "From a critical standpoint, Stargate gives the initial impression of a very confused pop-cultural salad, randomly tossed together out of the vegetable bins of sci-fi, American military triumphalism, and a lot of Orientalizing Egyptomania. Yet the film was a lasting hit". Ultimately, he concludes that Stargate "serves as a neo-mythology able to re-enchant the world, to present an attractive anti-authoritarian option for identity formation and yet functionally equivalent to religion (according to traditional modern definitions) in its creationist tenet".

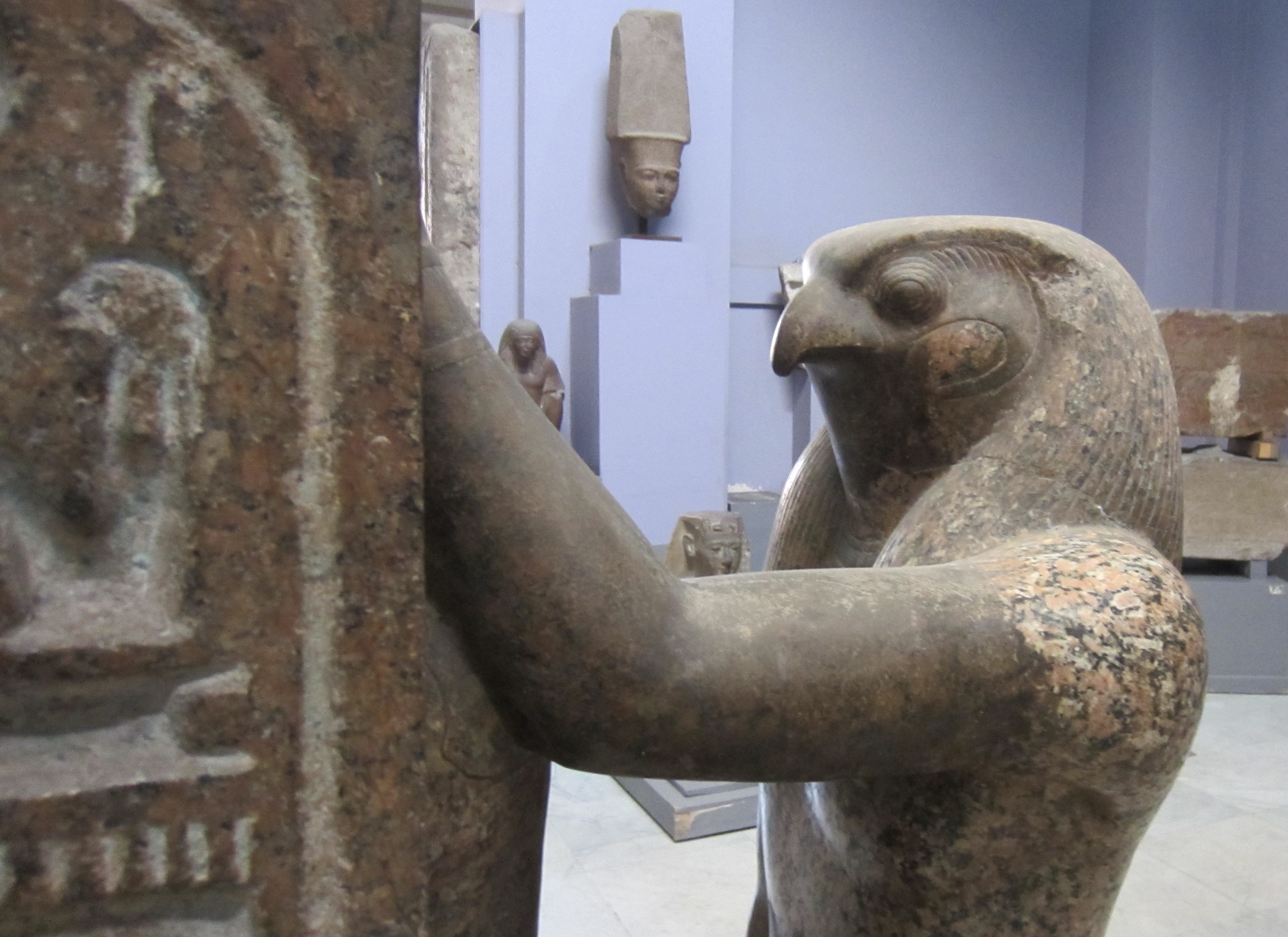
Stargate's Horus guards wear falcon-headed helmets, recalling the Egyptian war god Horus, shown here in statuary from the Twentieth Dynasty, early 12th century BC.

Examples from Frederic Krueger's analysis of Ancient Egyptian elements in Stargate
Ancient Egyptian element	Stargate
Abydos, a city	Abydos, a desert planet
Temples, pyramids	Similar artefacts; planet is populated by descendants of enslaved Ancient Egyptians
Ra, god of the sun	Tyrant has "assumed the persona" of Ra
Horus, falcon-headed war god	"Horus guards" wear "frightful helmets" like falcon heads
Anubis, jackal-headed funerary god	Captain of the guards, Anubis, wears jackal head helmet

Angela Ndalianis examines the mythology behind Stargate SG-1, noting the way it is created by "rewriting centuries-old human mythologies—Egyptian, Norse, Aztec, Greek, Arthurian, Roman—the series takes these myths and 'reboots' them as scientific fact." Norse mythology appears in the shape of the "good-guy aliens the Asgard", deriving explicitly in the fiction from Norse Asgard. In her view, the "layered mythology ... borrows shamelessly" from real-world mythologies, giving examples from several of them.

Among Stargate's eclectic borrowings is the Arthurian figure of Morgan le Fay. Painting by Frederick Sandys, 1864

Examples from Angela Ndalianis's analysis of borrowings from real-world mythologies in Stargate
Mythology	Borrowed figures
Ancient Egypt	Anubis, Apophis, Osiris
Ancient Greek	Cronus
Phoenician	Ba'al, Moloc
Shinto	Amaterasu
Celtic	Camulus, The Morrígan
Hindu	Kali, Nirṛti
Babylonian	Marduk, Ishkur
Arthurian legend	Merlin, Morgan le Fay
Norse	Asgard

== Franchise-spanning mythology ==
The film Stargate (1994) establishes that five thousand years ago, the god Ra was an alien who enslaved and transplanted humans from Earth to another planet via the Stargate. Eventually, the people of Earth rose up against him and buried their Stargate. The modern history of Earth and the Stargate begins when it is unearthed in Egypt in 1928. The device is brought to the United States in 1939 to keep it out of Nazi hands and eventually installed in a facility in Creek Mountain, Colorado (Cheyenne Mountain in Stargate SG-1). In the events of the film Dr. Daniel Jackson deciphers the workings of the Stargate and a team is sent through to the planet on the other side.

Stargate SG-1 resumes the story of the film, but establishes that Ra was the leader of a race of parasitic aliens known as the Goa'uld; they took on the role of Earth deities from a variety of mythologies and that there is a network of stargates across the Milky Way. In its pilot episode "Children of the Gods", which takes place a year after the film, Stargate Command is established in response to an attack by the Goa'uld Apophis, and given the mandate to explore other worlds and obtain technologies that can be used to defend Earth. They encounter other races, such as the Asgard, who only masquerade as the Norse gods to primitive cultures until said societies develop enough to see them as they actually are. (Note: "Red Sky" (Stargate SG-1)) Stargate SG-1 further extended the backstory of Earth humans by introducing the Ancients, an advanced race of humans from another galaxy who lived on Earth until approximately 10,000 years ago.

=== Stargate device ===
Depiction of the Stargate portal device at Cheyenne Mountain

A Stargate is a device that allows practical, rapid travel between two distant locations. The first Stargate appears in the 1994 film Stargate, and subsequently Stargate SG-1 and its spin-offs. In these productions, the Stargate functions as a plot generator, allowing the main characters to visit alien planets without the need for spaceships or any other fictional technology.

Within the Stargate fictional universe, Stargates are large metal rings with nine "chevrons" spaced equally around their circumference. Pairs of Stargates function by generating an artificial stable wormhole between them, allowing one-way travel through. The symbols on the inner ring of the Stargate correspond to constellations and serve to map out coordinates for various destination planets and other locations in space. Most destinations in the franchise are accessed by using only seven chevrons, but the eighth can be used to access other galaxies and the ninth can target special, specific gates.

A typical Stargate measures 6.7 m (22 ft) in diameter, weighs 29,000 kg (64,000 lb), and is made of the fictional heavy mineral "naquadah". The Stargates were created millions of years ago by an alien race known as the Ancients; their modern history begins when Egyptologist Daniel Jackson deciphers their workings in the Stargate film.

The Stargate device sets apart SG-1 from other science fiction shows by allowing modern-day people to travel to other planets in an instant, although scholar Dave Hipple argued that SG-1 "also deploys [science fiction] stereotypes both to acknowledge forebears and to position itself as a deserving heir". With the help of the central Stargate device, the premise of Stargate SG-1 combines ancient cultures, present-day political and social concerns, aliens and advanced technologies. Near-instantaneous interplanetary travel allows a fundamental difference in plot structure and set design from other series. There is a disjunction between politics on Earth and the realities of fighting an interstellar war. The Stargate also helps to speed up the exposition of the setting.

=== Ancients ===
The race of the Ancients is first mentioned in the Stargate SG-1 season 2 episode "The Fifth Race" as the original builders of the Stargate network and members of the former Alliance of four great races. They were considered humanity's predecessors, originally establishing Earth as their homeworld after they migrated to the Milky Way and having seeded multiple galaxies to allow life to evolve on uninhabited worlds. At the time that the Stargate franchise takes place, the Ancients have long since "ascended", i.e. they shed their physical bodies and live eternally as pure energy on a higher plane of existence with an increased power and capacity for learning. While they are no longer physically present in the universe, their highly advanced technology—including the Stargate—remains behind, all of which has shown to be almost entirely resilient to the decay of time, and has also proven to be the most advanced technology anyone has ever encountered. With humans from Earth as their closest descendants both from a genetic standpoint and an evolutionary standpoint, they have shown the most proclivity in utilizing Ancient technology when they encounter it.

For the first six seasons of Stargate SG-1, the ascended Ancients maintain a strict rule of noninterference in mortal affairs of the material galaxy, and the interactions between humans of Earth and the Ancients are restricted to the outcast Ancient characters Oma Desala and Orlin. The Ancients' ascension was also used as a plot device for the departure of actor Michael Shanks (Daniel Jackson) in season 6 of Stargate SG-1. The fictional background of the Ancients was extended with the franchise's Atlantis mythos that began in the Stargate SG-1 season 6 finale "Full Circle", and which also served as the basis for spin-off show Stargate Atlantis. The Ori arc of Stargate SG-1's seasons 9 and 10 expanded the Ancient mythos further.

=== Asgard ===
A benevolent race that, according to the mythology of Stargate, gave rise to Norse mythology on Earth and inspired accounts of the Roswell Greys. The Asgard can no longer reproduce and therefore perpetuate themselves by transferring their minds into new cloned bodies. Extremely advanced technologically, the threat of their intervention protects many planets in the Milky Way, including Earth, from Goa'uld attack. They also provide much assistance to Earth in the way of technology, equipment, and expertise. Their main adversary in Stargate SG-1 are the mechanical Replicators, against which they enlist the aid of SG-1 on several occasions. The entire Asgard civilization chooses to self-destruct in "Unending", due to the degenerative effects of repeated cloning. A small rogue colony of Asgard, known as the Vanir, still exist in the Pegasus galaxy. They were able to slow cloning's negative side effects by experimenting on humans.

== Mythology of Stargate SG-1 ==
Stargate SG-1 takes place mostly in the Milky Way galaxy. Brad Wright and Jonathan Glassner tried to stay true to the feature film, but also wanted Stargate SG-1 to be unique in its own way. Stargate SG-1 gradually evolved away from the basic premise of the film and developed its own unique mythological superstructure. Stargate SG-1 elaborated on the film's Egyptian hybrid mythology and mixed in other historical mythologies, coming up with a mythological superstructure that explains the existence of all of the other mythologies in the overarching Stargate narrative. The series expands upon Egyptian mythology (notably the Egyptian gods Apep/Apophis, and Anubis as Goa'uld villains), Norse mythology (notably the god Thor as an Asgard ally), Arthurian legend (notably Merlin as an Ancient ally), and many other mythologies like Greek and Roman mythology. SG-1 does not introduce new alien races as often as some other science fiction television series. Most civilizations that the Goa'uld had transplanted maintain much of their original Earth culture, and Stargate SG-1 does not equate civilization with technology like many other sci-fi shows do. Newly encountered races or visited planets are integrated into the mythology, although plotlines of individual episodes are often new, self-standing and accessible for new audiences, giving a compelling internal coherence.

The writers had to strike a balance in the interaction between the explorers from Earth and advanced races (of which there were only few in the story) so that alliances could be developed where the advanced races do not give Earth all their technology and knowledge. Stargate SG-1 emphasized its present-day-Earth story frame by frequently referencing popular culture, like The X-Files and Buffy the Vampire Slayer had done before. According to one critic in 1997, Stargate SG-1 was designed to have no nationality, which might appeal to viewers all over the world. The final episodes of season 7 (2004) brought a more global approach to the scenario when the Stargate Program was revealed to over a dozen nations, which further helped the international appeal of Stargate SG-1.

=== Alliance of four great races ===
SG-1 learns in season 1's "The Torment of Tantalus" that although most known habitable planets in the Stargate universe are populated by humans, there was once an Alliance of four great races. In season 2's "The Fifth Race", the Asgard tell Jack O'Neill that this strategic alliance had consisted of the Ancients, the Asgard, the Furlings, and the Nox, and that the humans from Earth had taken the first steps towards becoming "the Fifth Race". (This comes full circle in the Stargate SG-1 finale "Unending", when Thor declares the humans from Earth the Fifth Race.)

SG-1 had encountered the Nox in season 1's "The Nox", a fairy-like people that wants nothing to do with humanity, viewing them as "young" and having "much to learn". The Nox can live to be hundreds of years old and have a great desire for wisdom and understanding. They are extreme pacifists and never employ violence for any reason, even to defend themselves. Although they outwardly seem to be primitive forest-dwellers, they possess superhuman intelligence and advanced technology beyond that of the Goa'uld, including a floating city. As they have the ability to render themselves and other objects invisible and intangible, as well as the ability to resurrect the dead, they never need to fight. The Nox also appear in "Enigma" and "Pretense".

However, Stargate SG-1 revealed virtually nothing about the Furlings, beside making them the story backdrop of an abandoned site in season 6's "Paradise Lost". Furling skeletons were originally planned to be featured in the episode, but the production of such proved to be too expensive. Jack O'Neill concludes that the Furlings must be cute and cuddly creatures, based solely on their name. In "Citizen Joe", another character equates the Furlings to Ewoks based on their name. The length of time that the Furling nature remained a mystery in the series turned into a running gag. When Executive Producer Robert C. Cooper was asked "Will we ever meet the Furlings?", his answer was "Who says we haven't?". The writers later went on to state that apart from showing Furling technology and legacy, no member of the Furling race has ever appeared on the show. Producer Joseph Mallozzi claimed that more about the Furlings would finally be revealed in SG-1's tenth season, which turned out to be an imagined scene from a movie script based on the fictional television series "Wormhole X-Treme!", a parody of Stargate SG-1 set in the Stargate SG-1 universe. The Furlings were depicted as Ewok-like, or koala-like creatures that are destroyed by the Goa'uld soon after making contact with SG-1.

=== Goa'uld ===
The Goa'uld are the primary adversaries in Stargate SG-1 from seasons 1 to 8. Stargate SG-1 creators Brad Wright and Jonathan Glassner established in SG-1's 1997 pilot episode "Children of the Gods" that the film's unnamed alien race and the Goa'uld are the same. As such, the look of the series' Goa'uld, including the early archvillain Apophis, was based on Ra in the feature film. The Goa'uld are introduced as the first and most prominent alien race in the Milky Way, and are also one of the few nonhumanoid species to appear in the early seasons of the series. They are a parasitic species that resemble finned snakes, which can burrow themselves into a humanoid's neck and wrap around the spinal column. (Note: https://www.youtube.com/watch?v=pAHgB-k-jD8 Stargate: Instructional videos by Daniel Jackson) The Goa'uld parasite (generally referred to as a "symbiote") then takes control of its host's body and mind, while providing longevity and perfect health. The Goa'uld are branded as evil by their pretending to be gods and forcing people to submit to their quasi-religious pronouncements. The most powerful Goa'uld in the galaxy are collectively known as the System Lords.

The fictional backstory is established over the course of the series. In season 4's "The First Ones", it is stated that the Goa'uld evolved on the planet P3X-888, where there are still populations of primitive Goa'uld. Their original hosts were the Unas (meaning "First Ones"), a race of large and primitive humanoids also native to the planet and whom SG-1 had first encountered in season 1's "Thor's Hammer". The Goa'uld then found and ruled over Earth for thousands of years, masquerading as gods from ancient mythologies and transplanting humans throughout the galaxy to serve as slaves and hosts. A faction of Goa'uld symbiotes named the Tok'ra (meaning "against Ra"), whom SG-1 first encounter in season 2's "The Tok'ra" and become close allies with, formed in opposition to the Goa'uld culturally and militarily millennia ago to live in true symbiosis with their hosts, both beings sharing the body equally and benefiting from each other.

The Goa'uld modified humans to create the Jaffa to serve as soldiers and as incubators for their young via an abdominal pouch. The story of the Jaffa is primarily told through the main character Teal'c. The Jaffa's look in the series was copied from the Egyptian look of Ra from the film. The Jaffa rely on the symbiotes for their immune system or will die a slow and painful death that can only be avoided by either acquiring a new symbiote or by lifelong regular injections of a replacement drug called Tretonin. Ordinary Jaffa bear a black tattoo symbol of their Goa'uld master's insignia on their foreheads, and the highest-ranking Jaffa in the service of a Goa'uld is known as the First Prime, who has the symbol branded in gold. SG-1 encounters three notable Jaffa factions: the all-female Hak'tyl ("liberation") led by Ishta in season 7's "Birthright", the Ancient-worshipping Sodan in season 9's "Babylon", and the Ori-worshipping Illac Renin (meaning "Kingdom of the Path") in season 10's "Talion".

The planet Dakara, a holy ground for the Goa'uld and Jaffa alike, is the turning point in the Goa'uld–Jaffa power struggle in season 8's "Reckoning"/"Threads": It is where the Ancients first landed in the Milky Way Galaxy after fleeing the Alteran Galaxy and later built a powerful device, capable of destroying existing life or creating it where there was none before, long before the galaxy was colonized by the Goa'uld or the humans. Since season 8 was intended to be the show's last, the producers had finished it with the defeat of the Goa'uld and the Replicators. However, when the Sci Fi Channel renewed the series, the producers had grown tired of writing endings. Having had good experiences with the first season of Stargate Atlantis, the producers decided to revamp the series by more than just adding new characters, new villains and new missions. Thus they considered the beginning of Season 9 as the pilot of a new show and replaced the Goa'uld with the Ori as the main villains. The Goa'uld still appeared in the show, but on a regular basis under the command of Ba'al.

=== Ori ===
A major threat in the cosmos, the Ori are Ascended beings who use their advanced knowledge of the universe to force lesser beings to worship them. In essence, they used to be Ancients, however they split into separate groups due to different views of life. The Ori are religious while the Ancients prefer science. The Ori sway lesser-developed planets into worshipping them by promising Ascension through an invented and empty religion called "Origin". This religion states that they created humanity and as such are to be worshiped by their creations. It also promises its followers that, on death, they will Ascend. However, Origin was designed to channel energy from the human worshipers to the Ori. As such, the Ori never help anyone else Ascend because then they would have to share the power that they sap from their worshipers. Their ultimate goal is to completely destroy the Ascended Ancients, who they know as "the Others". All of their efforts, including their technology, are for the purpose of garnering worshippers.

As Ascended beings, the Ori do not interfere directly in the mortal plane. Instead, they use humans called Priors, which they artificially evolve so that they are one step from Ascension, giving the Priors godlike powers. Because the Ori have worshipers across the entire home galaxy of the Ancients, and use their knowledge to spread, they are nearly unstoppable. For example: Ori warships, built using conventional means while operated through the supernatural abilities of the Priors, are generally considered to be the most powerful vessels in the Stargate universe.

The Ori might be regarded as a shadow form of the Goa'uld, with the significant difference that the Ori promise ascension to their followers but never provide it.

== Mythology of Stargate Atlantis ==
Stargate Atlantis explores the adventures of an elite expedition from Earth, the "Atlantis Expedition", in the Pegasus Galaxy. (Note: Stargate Atlantis never explicitly states if the fictional Pegasus Galaxy refers to the real Pegasus Dwarf Spheroidal Galaxy, the real Pegasus Dwarf Irregular Galaxy, or neither. Images displayed during the series run displays an irregular galaxy and dialogue states the Pegasus Galaxy to be 3 Mly away; thus it can be assumed to be the real Pegasus Dwarf Irregular Galaxy.) The story arc of Stargate Atlantis begins in the season 6 finale of Stargate SG-1, "Full Circle", where Daniel Jackson first mentions the Lost City of the Ancients. The search for the Lost City continues through SG-1' season 7 with the aim to find powerful weapons, and ends with an Ancient outpost found in Antarctica in the season 7 finale "Lost City". In SG-1's season 8 premiere "New Order", Daniel Jackson discovers the gate address to the legendary city Atlantis of Greek mythology. The Atlantis Expedition has a multi-nation civilian leadership and a predominantly United States military faction providing security. Their intent is to establish diplomacy with inhabitants of the galaxy and a permanent human base in the city of Atlantis for scientific and military research and exploration.

=== Atlantis ===
The pilot episode "Rising" of Stargate Atlantis establishes much of the backstory of Atlantis: The city was built by the Ancients millions of years ago, originally as a central outpost in prehistoric Antarctica, until an unexplained crisis—involving a virulent plague—forced them to relocate the city to the planet Lantea in the Pegasus Galaxy via intergalactic hyperdrive engines. The Ancients (known as "Ancestors" to the denizens of Pegasus, and "Lanteans" to the Wraith) seeded several human populations in the Pegasus galaxy, but rarely interbred with them. As explained in season 1's "The Defiant One", the Wraith drove the Ancients from their holdings until only Atlantis was left, defended by its powerful shield and a network of armed satellites. The Atlantis Expedition learn during their arrival in Atlantis in "Rising" that the Ancients submerged the city in Lantea's ocean to evade detection by the Wraith and returned via stargate to Earth, where survivor recollections formed the basis for the ancient Greek accounts of Lost City of Atlantis. In the Atlantis series finale "Enemy at the Gate", Atlantis returns to Earth and lands in the Pacific Ocean near San Francisco.

The producers intended the city of Atlantis to be the size of Manhattan. Many sets used for Atlantis are part of a large sound stage that was built for almost US$2 million. This stage is used for rooms like the brig, several balconies, and other interior parts of Atlantis. Green screens were used if an outdoor view was required in an episode. According to digital effects artist Bruce Woloshyn, the series' original CGI model of the city of Atlantis was over four million polygons, which was feature film in size. This allows the city model to still look good and detailed in extreme close view. Since most of the city is modelled rather than textured, the details appear more realistic when the virtual camera revolves around the city model.

=== Wraith ===
The Wraith are the main antagonists in Stargate Atlantis and the dominant species in the Pegasus Galaxy. They are biologically immortal hive-based humanoids who maintain the human worlds of the Pegasus Galaxy as livestock to feed on their "life-force". As established in season 1's "The Gift", the Wraith evolved in the Pegasus galaxy after a human population seeded by the Ancients was fed upon by an insect called the irratus bug, which has the ability to draw upon a human's life to heal itself. As they fed, the bugs incorporated human DNA into themselves, giving rise to the Wraith. The Wraith have destroyed any civilizations with the potential to threaten their dominance, and few human races in Pegasus surpass Earth in technological advancement when the Earth expedition arrives.

The existence of the Wraith is restricted to waking en masse every few centuries to replenish their health by galaxy-wide abductions of humans called "cullings", but the arrival of the Atlantis Expedition in the Pegasus Galaxy in the pilot episode "Rising" leads to the Wraith waking prematurely from their hibernation. To sate their hunger, the Wraith try to get to Earth whose population is much bigger than that of the whole Pegasus Galaxy. This can only be achieved either through the Stargate or by getting more advanced Hyper drive technology, both of which are present in the city of Atlantis.

== Mythology of Stargate Universe ==
Stargate Universe was conceived as "a completely separate, third entity" in the live-action Stargate franchise. Although it was firmly entrenched in pre-established Stargate mythology, Stargate Universe diverged in a new direction. Like the first two series in the franchise, Stargate Universe takes place during the present time, not in the distant future. Unlike SG-1 and Atlantis, no single dominant villain race is featured. (Note: Mallozzi, Joseph and Wright, Brad (January 2, 2009). "January 2, 2009: Brad Wright Answers Your Questions". josephmallozzi.wordpress.com.)

The show is set on the Ancient ship Destiny, which is established as a part of an Ancient experiment to seed the universe with Stargates millions of years ago and investigate a groundbreaking discovery they made pertaining to the origins of the universe. The Destiny itself was intended to follow a pre-programmed course to explore these galaxies, but was left uncrewed and lost at the time of the Ancients' ascension. The series starts when a team of soldiers and scientists from Earth step through the Stargate to find the Destiny and are unable to return to Earth. The show focuses mostly on the people aboard the ship and their survival instead of planet-based exploration, and according to Brad Wright, would also "focus on exploration and adventure – and, by extension, the occasional alien encounter as well". In Brad Wright's words, the show was to be "hopefully exploring the truly alien, and avoiding the rubber faced English-speaking one".
