= Robert C. Cooper =

Canadian writer and producer

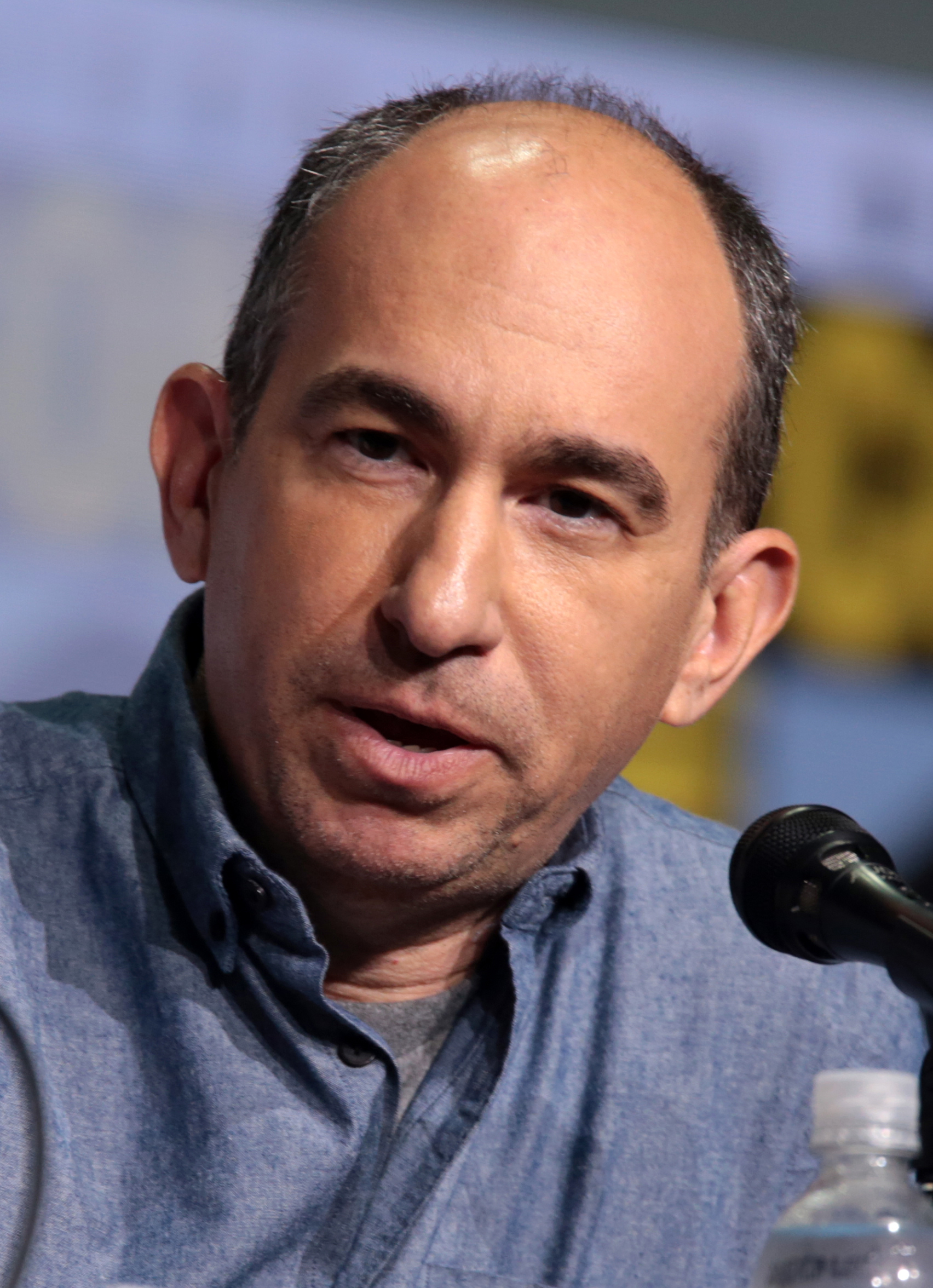
- Cooper at the 2017 San Diego Comic-Con
- Born: October 14, 1968 (age 57); Toronto, Ontario, Canada
- Occupations: Executive producer screenwriter
- Spouse: Hillary Cooper
- Children: Emma Cooper; Megan Elizabeth Cooper

Robert C. Cooper is a Canadian writer and producer best known for his work in the Stargate franchise. He was formerly an executive producer of Stargate SG-1, Stargate Atlantis and Stargate Universe. He also co-created both Stargate Atlantis and Stargate Universe with Brad Wright. Cooper has written and produced many episodes of Stargate SG-1, Stargate Atlantis and Stargate Universe as well as directed a number of episodes.

== Career ==
Cooper started his writing career with a series of films, the first of which was Blown Away. He joined the crew of Psi Factor: Chronicles of the Paranormal as a story editor until he was promoted to a writer in 1996 where he worked until moving to Stargate SG-1 in 1997 as an executive story editor.

Whilst working on Stargate SG-1, Cooper is credited with writing 52 episodes. Cooper became a co-executive producer of Stargate SG-1 in season 4, and a full executive producer in season 5. He made a cameo appearance in the Stargate SG-1 fifth season episode "Wormhole X-Treme!", in which he was a staff writer who was told to get back to work.

Cooper was responsible for creating much of the backstory of the Stargate universe. According to Stargate SG-1: The Essential Scripts, Cooper's ideas about the history of the Stargate universe were his own; he wasn't working from ideas in a series bible. Cooper created the Ancients, the race that built the stargates. He also developed the idea of the Alliance of Four Races, even though two of the races had been invented by other writers (the Nox and the Asgard created by Hart Hanson and Katharyn Powers respectively).

In December 2003, it was announced that Cooper and Brad Wright had been working on a Stargate SG-1 spin-off series titled Stargate Atlantis.

Cooper made his directorial debut with "Crusade" a ninth season episode of Stargate SG-1. In the 10th season premiere episode "Flesh and Blood", Cooper's daughter Emma played the 4 year old Adria. Later in the tenth season of Stargate SG-1, in early scenes of the episode "Talion", his older daughter Megan Elizabeth Cooper played a jaffa girl. Cooper also directed "Unending" the final episode of Stargate SG-1. Following the conclusion of SG-1, Cooper wrote and directed the direct-to-DVD movie Stargate: The Ark of Truth.

After Stargate Atlantis was cancelled, Cooper and Brad Wright went on to create another spin-off, Stargate Universe which premiered on October 2, 2009. In June 2010, it was revealed that Cooper was "stepping back to ... a consulting role" for the end of Stargate Universe season 2, before leaving entirely.

== Filmography ==
=== Film ===
Title	Year	Credited as			Notes
Title	Year	Director	Producer	Writer	Notes
Blown Away	1992	No	No	Yes	
The Dark	1993	No	No	Yes	
No Contest	1994	No	No	Yes	
The Club	1994	No	No	Yes	
The Impossible Elephant	2001	No	No	Yes	
Stargate: The Ark of Truth	2008	Yes	Yes	Yes	
Stargate: Continuum	2008	No	Yes	No	

=== Television ===
The numbers in directing and writing credits refer to the number of episodes.

Title	Year	Credited as				Network	Notes
Title	Year	Creator	Director	Writer	Executive producer	Network	Notes
Psi Factor: Chronicles of the Paranormal	1996–97	No	No	Yes (3)	No		
Flash Forward	1997	No	No	Yes (1)	No		
Stargate SG-1	1997–2007	No	Yes (2)	Yes (58)	Yes	Showtime; Syfy	co-producer (1998–99: 12 episodes), supervising producer (1999–2000: 11 episodes), producer (1999: 11 episodes), co-executive producer (2000–01: 22 episodes), executive producer (2001–07: 126 episodes)
Best Actress	2000	No	No	Yes	No	E!	Television film
Stargate Atlantis	2004–09	Yes	Yes (3)	Yes (10)	Yes	Syfy	
Stargate Universe	2009–11	Yes	Yes (2)	Yes (9)	Yes	Syfy	
Dark Matter	2015–16	No	No	Yes (2)	No	CTV Sci-Fi Channel	consulting producer (12 episodes)
Dirk Gently's Holistic Detective Agency	2016–17	No	No	Yes (2)	Yes	BBC America	
Unspeakable	2019	Yes	Yes (2)	Yes (4)	Yes	CBC Television	

== Awards ==
Out of fifteen nominations, Cooper has received four awards.

- 2009 – Leo Awards, Best Direction in a Dramatic Series: Stargate Atlantis: "Vegas"
- 2009 – Leo Awards, Best Dramatic Series: Stargate Atlantis (Shared)
- 2009 – Leo Awards, Outstanding Achievement Award – Individual (Shared with Brad Wright)
- 2006 – The Constellation Awards, Best Overall 2006 Science Fiction Film or Television Script: Stargate SG-1: "200" (Shared with Brad Wright)
