= Revelations (Stargate SG-1) =

- Stargate SG-1 episode
- Episode no.: Season 5 Episode 22
- Directed by: Martin Wood
- Written by: Joseph Mallozzi and Paul Mullie
- Production code: 522
- Original air date: May 17, 2002

Guest appearances
- Anna-Louise Plowman as Osiris; Teryl Rothery as Heimdall (Voice); David Palffy as Anubis; P.J. Johal as Jaffa #1; Shaker Paleja as Jaffa #2; Martin Sims as Jaffa #3; Michael Shanks as Thor (Voice)

Episode chronology
← Previous "Meridian"	Next → "Redemption (Parts 1 & 2)"
- Stargate SG-1 season 5

"Revelations" is the season 5 finale episode of the science fiction television series Stargate SG-1. This episode was nominated for an Emmy for Outstanding Special Visual Effects for a Series, and won a Gemini Award for Best Visual Effects.

== Plot ==
An Asgard mothership commanded by Thor confronts two Goa'uld pyramid ships over an alien planet under Asgard protection. The Goa'uld commander, Osiris, is defiant and for good reason: when Thor opens fire, his weapons fail to penetrate the Goa'uld ships' shields. At Stargate Command, still grieving Daniel Jackson's recent death, the Asgard Freyr arrives with the news of Thor's defeat and that the Goa'uld have developed advanced technologies that threaten all of the worlds under Asgard protection, including Earth. For the moment, he enlists SG-1 on a mission to save the Asgard scientist Heimdall before he is captured by Osiris' master Anubis.

SG-1 arrives at Heimdall's laboratory in a Goa'uld cargo ship, where they learn that Heimdall is researching ways to reverse the genetic degradation in the Asgard race, caused by repeated cloning. Heimdall informs them that Thor is alive; O'Neill and Teal'c ring onto Osiris' ship, while Carter guides them from the lab. However, Osiris subdues them by pumping poisonous gas onto their deck. Osiris also sends troops to the surface, and eventually breaks into the laboratory and captures Carter. Meanwhile, Anubis arrives and probes Thor's mind with a device that links his brain to the computer. This inadvertently gives Thor access to the ship systems, allowing him to free O'Neill and Teal'c. They disable the shields on Osiris' ship, allowing Heimdall to beam them, Carter, and Thor onto the cargo ship. They are coming under fire when Freyr arrives with three advanced Asgard ships, forcing Anubis to withdraw. Back at the SGC, Carter informs the others that Thor is in a coma, but that the Asgard may have turned the tide in their war with the Replicators. On their way to dinner, they feel an odd breeze inside the base, suggesting that Daniel may not be completely gone after all.

== Production ==
Daniel Jackson does not appear in person in this episode. However, unexplained events at the end of the episode insinuate the presence of the ascended Jackson. Michael Shanks appears in Thor's voice. This is the last episode where Michael Shanks will be listed in the main cast until season 7. Teryl Rothery (Janet Fraiser) provides the voice of Heimdall. According to the episode audio commentary, Rothery performed her lines on set to help give the actors a reference point. However, Richard Dean Anderson, Chris Judge and Rothery could not keep a straight face as the eye line they were given was a blinking light in Rothery's chest. This episode broke the SG-1 tradition of ending the season half way through the episode, or an end of the season cliffhanger.

== Reception ==
This episode was nominated for an Emmy for Outstanding Special Visual Effects for a Series, and won a Gemini Award for Best Visual Effects.
