= Enemies (Stargate SG-1) =

- Stargate SG-1 episode
- Episode no.: Season 5 Episode 1
- Directed by: Martin Wood
- Story by: Brad Wright; Robert C. Cooper; Joseph Mallozzi; Paul Mullie
- Teleplay by: Robert C. Cooper
- Production code: 501
- Original air date: June 29, 2001

Guest appearances
- Carmen Argenziano as Jacob/Selmak; Peter Williams as Apophis; Jennifer Calvert as Councilwoman Ren Al; Gary Jones as Walter Harriman; Thomas Milburn Jr. as Jaffa; Dean Moen as Jaffa

Episode chronology
← Previous "Exodus"	Next → "Threshold"
- Stargate SG-1 (season 5)

"Enemies" is the season 5 premiere episode of the science fiction television series Stargate SG-1 and part two of a three-part story arc. This episode was nominated for an Emmy in the category "Outstanding Special Visual Effects for a Series" and a Gemini Award in the category "Best Visual Effects".

== Plot ==
Thrown into another galaxy by the supernova, SG-1 now face Apophis. Having no other options, they contact Apophis but he isn't interested in what they wish to say and threatens to destroy them. SG-1 can do nothing but wait for their destruction. Apophis finally fires. However, not on them, but instead he fires upon another alien ship, which attacks Apophis. Jacob uses this chance to escape and flies the ship into the corona of a blue giant, whose radiation will mask their presence but also block their own sensors. They are able to repair their shields but have no crystals left to repair the Hyperspace engines. In the meantime, O'Neill recounts what happened on Vorash to Daniel.

At Stargate Command, the Tok'ra visit General Hammond, explaining that they destroyed Apophis' fleet as planned but contact has been lost with SG-1. Hammond, however, refuses to believe they are dead.

On their ship, the Carters complete the repairs and leave the corona. They detect Apophis' ship, yet no life signs emanate from it, so they ring aboard to get new crystals. There, it appears the self-destruct command was activated, which Jacob wants to deactivate, while O'Neill and Major Carter retrieve the crystals. However, they soon detect Replicators. Nevertheless, they procure the crystals, but not before the Replicators attack. The three ring back to the Ha'tak and escape in the wake of the explosion of Apophis' ship. Afterwards, they bring the hyperspace engines back online when they suddenly detect a Tel'tak, piloted by Teal'c with several Jaffa who, according to Teal'c, helped him escape. Teal'c lands his ship on the Ha’tak and is greeted by his team mates. However, when O'Neill goes to embrace him, Teal’c takes his gun and, with the other Jaffa, holds SG-1 at gunpoint. Apophis enters and declares Teal'c as his First Prime again.

SG-1 is arrested while Teal'c claims that he was in the service of Apophis all along, calling his time with SG-1 “subterfuge.” The Jaffa begin to unload the cargo from the Tel'tak, unknowingly bringing Replicators aboard. As SG-1 tries to escape, Jacob frees them, only to be stopped by Teal'c, imprisoning him as well. Suddenly, the ship unexpectedly exits hyperspace. Jaffa find the engine room infested with Replicators. By mere happenstance, the Replicators also allow SG-1 to escape their cell. Apophis tries to escape from the Replicators as they kill his Jaffa, forcing him to barricade himself in the command center.

While Jacob and Daniel secure the cargo ship, Jack and Sam try to subdue Teal'c with help from a shock grenade. They successfully capture him with a precise but not lethal shot and kill the remaining Jaffa. Teal'c is safely brought aboard the Tel'tak but, without any warning, the mothership enters hyperspace, barring any way to get off the Ha’tak.

SG-1 quickly learns that the Replicators have modified the engines so that the ship exceeds its fastest velocity by 800 times. This will also allow SG-1 to quickly travel back to their home galaxy. However, because of the threat which the Replicators pose, they must prevent the scourge from ever infesting the Milky Way. So, they plan to use the same tactic which they used on Thor's ship by destroying the sub-light engines' controls (causing an uncontrolled re-entry of the ship into the atmosphere (see "Nemesis"). While Jacob returns to the cargo ship, SG-1 goes to the engine room to lay in wait for the right moment to execute their plan. When the ship leaves hyperspace right in front Sokar's home planet, they destroy the control crystals and escape but are chased by Replicators. Nevertheless, they are able to get into a ring room and Jacob rings them to the Tel'tak. They leave the Ha'tak, which falls to the planet and is destroyed, thus finally eliminating the evil Apophis.

As they head home, Jacob tells Jack that although they've gotten Teal'c's body back, getting his mind freed from Apophis's brainwashing techniques won't be easy.

Unbothered, Jack attempts to convince Teal'c that Apophis is dead but Teal'c refuses to believe him, simply stating that Gods cannot be killed.

== Reception ==
This episode was nominated for an Emmy in the category "Outstanding Special Visual Effects for a Series" and a Gemini Award in the category "Best Visual Effects".

== Series continuity ==
This episode marked the final death of Apophis, though actor Peter Williams returned in several later episodes to reprise his role in flashbacks, hallucinations, and alternate realities, including Citizen Joe, Inauguration, and Stargate: Continuum.

While the Replicators in earlier episodes were always spider-like, this episodes introduces them in several new insect-forms.
