= Reckoning (Stargate SG-1) =

- Stargate SG-1 episodes
- Episode nos.: Season 8 Episodes 16 & 17
- Directed by: Peter DeLuise
- Written by: Damian Kindler
- Production codes: 816 & 817
- Original air dates: January 25, 2005; February 1, 2005

Guest appearances
- Tony Amendola as Bra'tac; Carmen Argenziano as Jacob Carter/Selmak; Cliff Simon as Ba'al; Gary Jones as Walter Harriman; Samantha Banton as Ba'al's Lieutenant; Mel Harris as Oma Desala; Isaac Hayes as Tolok; Jeff Judge as Aron; Dean Aylesworth as Old Anubis; Rik Kiviaho as New Anubis; Vince Crestejo as Yu; Kevan Ohtsji as Yu's First Prime; Eric Breker as Reynolds; Dan Shea as Siler; Emy Aneke as Ba'al's Jaffa; Michael Shanks as Thor (Voice)

Episode chronology
← Previous "Citizen Joe"	Next → "Threads"
- Stargate SG-1 (season 8)

"Reckoning" is a two-part episode from Season 8 of the science fiction television series Stargate SG-1. It resolves the long-running story arcs of the Goa'uld, the Replicators, and the Jaffa Rebellion, and are regarded as two of the most popular episodes of the series. This episode was nominated for an Emmy Award in the category "Outstanding Special Visual Effects for a Series" and a Leo Award in the category "Best Visual Effects".)

== Plot ==
=== Part 1 ===
The episode begins with an emissary of Ba'al demanding the surrender of Yu and the remaining Goa'uld System Lords. Unexpectedly, Samantha Carter is brought before them, revealing herself to be Replicator Carter as she stabs Yu and her Replicator ship advances on the Goa'uld space station. Elsewhere, SG-1 and Bra'tac are preparing for a rebel Jaffa mission when they come under attack by a Replicator-controlled Ha'tak. Their ship becomes infested, and Jackson is beamed away by the Replicators. At Stargate Command, Jacob Carter, host to the Tok'ra Selmak, brings grave news to General Jack O'Neill: the Replicators have begun a full-scale invasion of the Milky Way.

Thor of the Asgard arrives to assist in modifying the Replicator disruptor so that it is once again effective. Although he and Carter successfully modify the disruptor, the Replicators adapt after only a single shot and infest Thor's ship. Meanwhile, Teal'c and Bra'tac are dismayed that, in the face of this unstoppable foe, the Jaffa are re-pledging their loyalty to the Goa'uld en masse and the future of the Jaffa rebellion is in doubt. They decide on an audacious, last-ditch plan: with Ba'al's forces occupied and fighting the Replicators, the entire rebel army will capture Dakara, the holiest of Jaffa planets, thus proving once and for all that the Goa'uld are not gods. The rebel Jaffa find the planet lightly guarded and quickly seize its temple. However, at the behest of a robed figure, Ba'al breaks off the battle with the Replicators and sends his entire fleet towards Dakara.

On the Replicator ship, Replicator Carter probes Daniel's mind for buried knowledge from the time he was Ascended. After a ruse in which she pretends to be Oma Desala, she finds what she wants: the location of the only weapon in the galaxy capable of stopping her, hidden in the temple on Dakara. Ba'al contacts the SGC and tells them that they must destroy the weapon on Dakara before his fleet arrives, for the weapon is capable of destroying all life in the galaxy. Ba'al would not use such a weapon, but his new master would -- Anubis.

=== Part 2 ===
Sam and Jacob discover the superweapon controls hidden behind a wall in the Dakara temple, and realize that it can be calibrated to emit a Replicator disruptor wave. However, to prevent the Replicators from adapting, the wave must strike all of them throughout the galaxy at the same time. The only way this is possible is to simultaneously dial every Stargate in the Milky Way from Dakara, and to accomplish this Sam and Jacob are forced to turn to Ba'al for help. Ba'al slows the advance of his fleet to buy them more time, and appears on Dakara in hologram form to lend his assistance. Back on the Replicator ship, Replicator Carter delves deeper into Daniel's Ascended memories, but finds it too immense even for the Replicator network to handle. Contrary to her assurances, she sends Replicators to attack Earth through the Stargate. O'Neill orders the evacuation of Stargate Command and the activation of the base's self-destruct.

The fleets of Ba'al and Replicator Carter clash in a titanic battle over Dakara, with the small rebel Jaffa fleet caught in the middle. The Replicators land on the surface and charge the temple. On Earth, O'Neill and several other survivors are cut off from the surface and fight desperately to hold off the Replicators while attempting to dial the Stargate. At a crucial moment, Daniel manages to exploit his connection to Replicator Carter and freeze all the Replicators. Although Replicator Carter soon breaks free and stabs him, his actions give Sam and Jacob the few seconds needed to finish their work. The superweapon activates along with Stargates all over the galaxy; the disruptor wave disintegrates all the Replicators, including Replicator Carter. With the Replicators defeated, Ba'al suddenly finds himself surrounded by free Jaffa, and beams himself away. His escape inspires Jaffa everywhere to rebel, at last breaking Goa'uld's dominion over the galaxy. Despite the good news, Jack and Sam cannot help but wonder what happened to Daniel.

== Production ==
Both Amanda Tapping and Michael Shanks play dual roles in this episode. Tapping plays both Lt. Col. Samantha Carter and the RepliCarter. Shanks plays Dr. Daniel Jackson and provides the voice of Thor. Richard Dean Anderson and Michael Shanks do not share a scene in either episode. This episode is Michael Shanks' 150th episode.

The images of Ba'al and Anubis' homeworld are stock footage of Delmak, Sokar's homeworld. Ne'tu is clearly visible in the sky.

== Reception ==
Fans regarded "Reckoning" as two of the most popular episodes of the series. This episode was nominated for an Emmy Award in the category "Outstanding Special Visual Effects for a Series" and a Leo Award in the category "Best Visual Effects".)
