= List of Stargate SG-1 characters =

The main characters of Stargate SG-1 (from left): Vala Mal Doran, Janet Fraiser (recurring), Hank Landry, Teal'c, Cameron Mitchell, Jack O'Neill, Samantha Carter, Daniel Jackson, George Hammond; missing: Jonas Quinn

Over its decade of existence, science fiction TV series Stargate SG-1 developed an extensive and detailed backdrop of diverse characters. Many of the characters are members of alien species discovered while exploring the galaxy through the Stargate, although there are an equal number of characters from offworld human civilizations. While Stargate SG-1, Stargate Atlantis and Stargate Universe are separate shows, they take part in the same fictional universe, so no character is internally show-specific.

== Main characters ==
Except for the commanders of the top-secret Stargate Command military base (SGC), all main characters of Stargate SG-1 are members of the SG-1 team, the primary unit of the SGC in the show. SG-1's duties include first contact, reconnaissance and combat, diplomacy, initial archaeological surveying, and technological assessment. The composition of SG-1 changes several times during the series run and varies in several alternative universes.

=== Jack O'Neill ===
Jack O'Neill is a USAF colonel (later brigadier general, major general and then lieutenant general) who led the original mission through the Stargate in Stargate. He is played by Kurt Russell in the film, and by former MacGyver actor Richard Dean Anderson in a regular role in seasons 1–8, and in a recurring role in seasons 9–10, also Michael Welch played young Colonel O'Neill in episode "Fragile Balance". He also appears in Stargate: Continuum, and in seasons 1 and 3 of Stargate Atlantis. Colonel O'Neill is the leader of the SG-1 team in the first seven seasons, and takes charge of Stargate Command after his promotion to brigadier general at the beginning of season 8. He is promoted to major general at the beginning of season 9, and is reassigned to Washington, D.C., then makes sporadic appearances in the final episodes of season one of Stargate Universe.

=== Daniel Jackson ===
Dr. Daniel Jackson is a brilliant archaeologist and linguist, specializing in Egyptology, whose unusual theories concerning the origin of the Egyptian Pyramids led to his participation in the original mission through the stargate in Stargate. He is played by James Spader in the film and by Michael Shanks in a regular role in seasons 1–5 and 7–10, with a recurring role in season 6. He also appears in both direct-to-DVD films and in seasons 1 and 5 of Stargate Atlantis. Daniel joins the SG-1 team in search of his kidnapped wife (Sha're), until she dies in season 3. However, he decides to remain a part of SG-1, and does so until his ascension at the end of season 5. Following his decision to retake human form, he rejoins SG-1 at the beginning of season 7.

As stated in season 2's "1969", Daniel speaks 23 languages, including Russian, German, Spanish, and Egyptian. Throughout the run of the series, he becomes Earth's foremost expert on the Ancients, and also learns many alien languages, such as Goa'uld, Ancient, and Unas.

=== Samantha Carter ===
Samantha "Sam" Carter is an astrophysicist and USAF captain (later major, lieutenant colonel, colonel, then brigadier general). She is played by Amanda Tapping in a regular role in seasons 1–10, in both direct-to-DVD films and makes an appearance in all seasons of Stargate Atlantis. Captain Carter joins SG-1 under the command of Col. O'Neill in season 1. Following her promotion to major in season 3, she is promoted to lieutenant colonel in early season 8 and assumes command of SG-1. She assists Lt. Col. Cameron Mitchell in seasons 9 and 10. After her appearance in Stargate: The Ark of Truth, she is promoted to a "full bird" colonel and becomes the new commander of the Atlantis expedition in season 4 of Stargate Atlantis before joining SG-1 again for Stargate: Continuum. She is later made the commander of the USS George Hammond, a Daedalus-class Earth ship named after former SGC commander General Hammond, who died in correlation with the actor who played him, Don S. Davis.

=== Teal'c ===
Teal'c /ˈtiːəlk/ is a Jaffa from the planet Chulak. He is played by Christopher Judge in a regular role in seasons 1–10, in both direct-to-DVD films and in season 4 of Stargate Atlantis. Throughout the entire run of Stargate SG-1, the only episode that the character was absent was Season 8's "Prometheus Unbound". Teal'c states that he is 101 years old in season 4's "The Light", and ages an additional 50 years in season 10's "Unending". His catchphrase is "Indeed". Teal'c's most notable feature is a golden tattoo on his forehead, a sign that he once served the Goa'uld Apophis as First Prime, the highest Jaffa rank. His interaction with Bra'tac (Apophis' former First Prime) and his own personal experiences led him to doubt the divinity of the Goa'uld.

Teal'c defects from Apophis in the pilot episode and joins the SG-1 team, believing this to be an opportunity to eventually defeat the Goa'uld and bring freedom to all Jaffa. He leaves his wife Drey'auc and his son Rya'c behind on Chulak. After succeeding in killing Apophis in season 5's "Enemies", Teal'c and Bra'tac make first progress in uniting a sizable group of Jaffa resistance warriors in season 5's "The Warrior". Teal'c and Bra'tac lose their symbiotes after a sabotaged rebel Jaffa summit in season 6's "The Changeling", but the Tok'ra drug Tretonin can sustain them and eventually becomes instrumental in liberating Jaffa from physiological reliance on Goa'uld symbiotes,. Teal'c and Bra'tac eventually lead the Jaffa to victory over the Goa'uld in season 8's "Reckoning"/"Threads". Teal'c is chosen as a member of the new Jaffa High Council and supports Bra'tac as an interim leader in season 9's "The Fourth Horseman" before a type of government is solidified.

=== George S. Hammond ===
George S. Hammond is a USAF Major General (later Lieutenant General) who commands Stargate Command in the first seven seasons. He is played by Don S. Davis in a regular role in seasons 1–7 and in a recurring role afterwards. He also appears in Stargate: Continuum and season 1 of Stargate Atlantis. Hammond took over from Major General West, commander of the Stargate Project in the original Stargate film, and originally intended the Stargate Program to be his last assignment before retirement. In season 2's "1969", General Hammond is shown to have worked at the Cheyenne Mountain complex (the present-day location of Stargate Command) in 1969. Hammond originates from Texas and became a widower when his wife died of cancer.

Hammond briefly retires under duress in season 4's "Chain Reaction", where he spends time with his two grandchildren, Kayla and Tessa. He is promoted to the rank of lieutenant general at the beginning of season 8, being placed in command of the new Homeworld Security command, a department in control of Stargate Command, the Prometheus project, and the Atlantian Antarctica outpost. Hammond recurs in the season 1 of Stargate Atlantis and seasons 8 through 10 of Stargate SG-1. Hammond appears in a civilian suit instead of a military uniform in season 9's "The Fourth Horseman", and Carter confirms his retired status in season 10's "The Road Not Taken". In his last appearance in the alternate timeline film Stargate: Continuum, Hammond acts as a military advisor to President Henry Hayes.

Don S. Davis knew Richard Dean Anderson (O'Neill) from Anderson's starring role in MacGyver, in which Davis was a stand-in for Dana Elcar (playing Pete Thornton, MacGyver's boss) before making several guest appearances. Davis died from a heart attack at the age of 65 on June 29, 2008, shortly before the release of Continuum, making this his final on-screen appearance as General Hammond. For his portrayal of Hammond, Don S. Davis was nominated for a 2004 Leo Award in the category "Dramatic Series: Best Supporting Performance by a Male" for the season 7 episode "Heroes, Part 2".

=== Jonas Quinn ===
Jonas Quinn is an alien from the planet Langara. He is played by former Parker Lewis Can't Lose actor Corin Nemec in a regular role in season 6, and in a recurring capacity in seasons 5 and 7. Jonas leaves his home planet Langara the penultimate season 5 episode "Meridian" after witnessing Daniel Jackson's lethal sacrifice and the following gleeful reaction of his planet's leaders. He is a fast learner and fills Daniel's empty spot on SG-1 in season 6. Following Daniel's return at the beginning of season 7, Jonas returns to his planet and last appears in the mid-season 7 episode "Fallout".

Corin Nemec replaced Michael Shanks (Daniel Jackson) during season 6 after Shanks had left the show amid controversy after season 5. The producers based Jonas's motivation to join SG-1 on his momentary reluctance to actively prevent Daniel's death and his feelings of responsibility afterwards. Jonas was slowly integrated into the story in a prolonged transition stage over the first half of season 6. Nemec was open to continue playing Jonas Quinn after season 6, but a new contract was reached with Michael Shanks for Daniel to return in season 7. The role of Jonas was reduced to recurring status in season 7.

=== Cameron Mitchell ===
Cameron "Cam" Mitchell is a USAF lieutenant colonel. He is played by former Farscape actor Ben Browder in a regular role in seasons 9–10 and in both direct-to-DVD films. Mitchell is introduced in "Avalon" as the leader of a squadron of F-302s against the forces of the arch villain Anubis in season 7's "Lost City". Assigned as the new commanding officer of SG-1 at the beginning of season 9, Mitchell struggles to reunite the team's former members under his command. Assisted by Carter (who is of equal rank), he remains in command of SG-1 throughout the series run and both films. He is promoted to the rank of full-bird Colonel in Stargate: Continuum.

Ben Browder joined the cast after Richard Dean Anderson's departure from Stargate SG-1 in 2005. From the beginning, producer Robert C. Cooper wanted Mitchell to be a "super fan" of SG-1 who is openly enthusiastic about exploring the galaxy. Mitchell is often at the center of the action and fight sequences. The producers did not realize the physical resemblance between Browder and Michael Shanks when Browder was cast, and employed make-up and costuming techniques to make the transition easier for the audience. The writers' decision to put Mitchell in command of SG-1 instead of Carter was met with resistance by some critics and audience members. For his portrayal of Cameron Mitchell, Ben Browder was nominated for a Saturn Award in the category "Best Supporting Actor on Television" in 2006.

=== Hank Landry ===
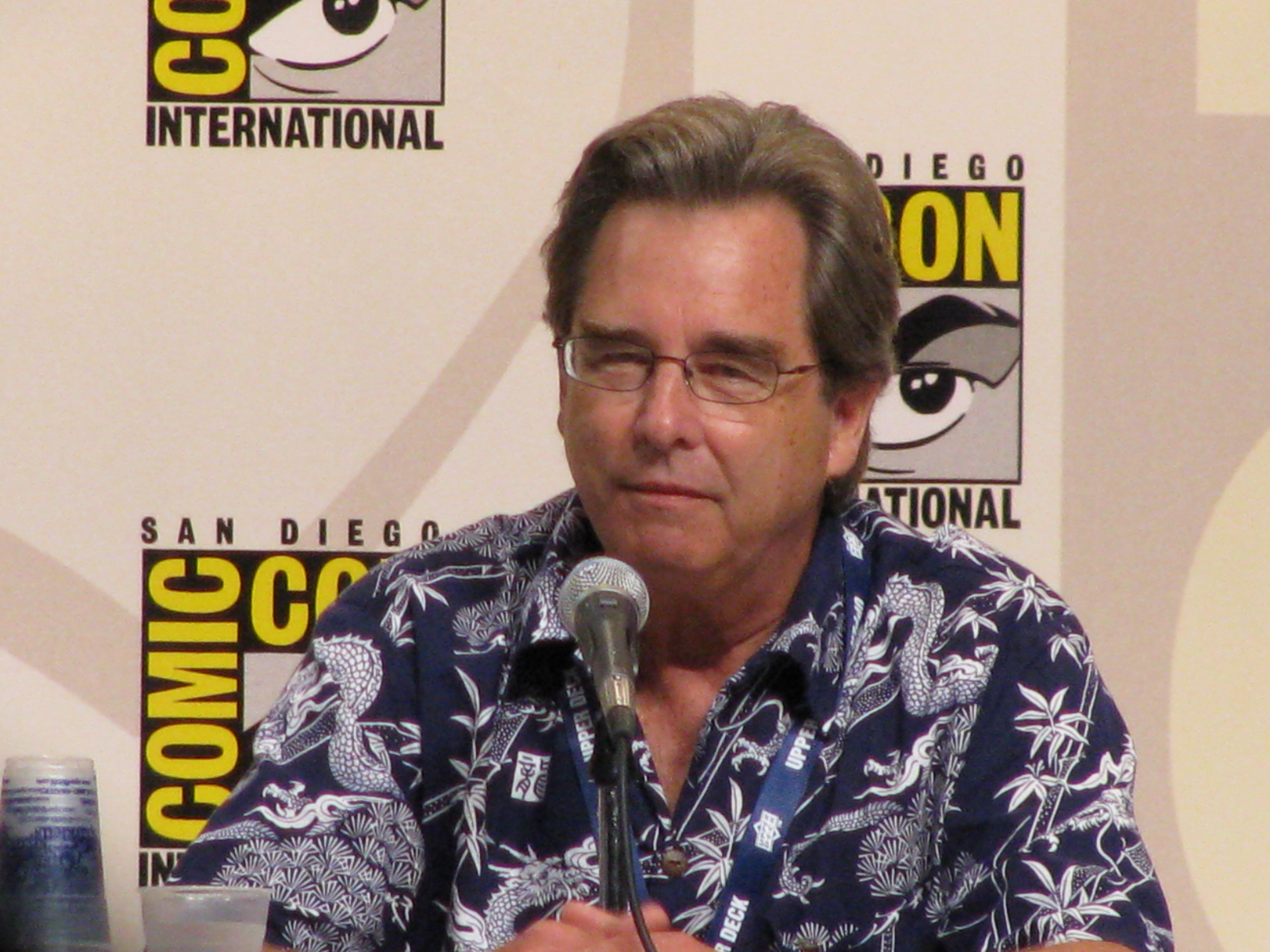
Beau Bridges played Hank Landry.

Henry "Hank" Landry is a United States Air Force Major General and the commander of Stargate Command from season 9 onwards. He is played by Beau Bridges in a regular role in seasons 9–10, in both direct-to-DVD films, and in the Stargate Atlantis episodes "The Intruder", "Critical Mass", "No Man's Land", and the two-part episode "The Return" of seasons 2 and 3. General Landry is introduced in SG-1's season 9 premiere, "Avalon", having been hand-picked by Jack O'Neill to succeed him. Landry once served as a pilot in the Vietnam War and met a Vietnamese woman named Kim Lam. They had a child, Carolyn Lam, but Landry became estranged to them and left them due to his involvement in military intelligence. Carolyn Lam grew up to be a doctor and was assigned to Stargate Command as chief medical officer in seasons 9 and 10. Bridges said that "Landry truly loves his work [but] respects and appreciates his daughter. He wants a real relationship with her and hopes that will happen some day. At the start of [season 9], you're not sure what their relationship is." The late season 10 episode "Family Ties" brings some conclusion to the Landry-Lam enstrangement, showing a reunification between Landry, Carolyn and Kim Lam in a restaurant.

TV Zone's Steven Eramo described Landry as "fair, intelligent, even-tempered and having a good sense of humour". Bridges thought that "[Landry] likes to empower his team. He realizes how challenged they are. It's a huge burden to protect their country from the entire galaxy, but he also recognizes that, like himself, they are human beings. [...] Sometimes he does that with a bark, and sometimes with a bite, but he also has a sense of humor, this man. And he likes to fool with people." According to Bridges, Landry appreciates Carter's knowledge, and needed some patience with the fast-speaking Daniel Jackson to realize "how important a piece of puzzle" he is. He respects Teal'c as a warrior, and is willing to foster the potential he sees in Vala.

The Stargate producers approached Beau Bridges, a self-claimed fan of science fiction, directly to play the role of Hank Landry. Although the producers had some ideas for the characters, they collaborated with Bridges to develop the character's backstory before the writing of season 9 began. Bridges wanted the character to be three-dimensional by revealing a layered backstory over the course of the show. Bridges researched famous US generals from George Washington to John P. Jumper to get a feeling for the role. He accumulated quotes by generals that Landry would respect, and gave the list to producer Robert C. Cooper, who in turn used it as free research. Bridges made no deliberate effort to distinguish his character from General O'Neill, believing that the character could stand on his own.

=== Vala Mal Doran ===
Vala Mal Doran is a con artist from an unnamed planet and a former human host to the Goa'uld Qetesh. She is played by former Farscape actress Claudia Black in a regular role in season 10 after having recurred in seasons 8 and 9 of SG-1. Her 1st appearance in season 8's "Prometheus Unbound" is followed by a recurring role in season 9, where she and Daniel unintentionally set off the new Ori threat. She joins SG-1 after giving birth to the new leader of the Ori at the beginning of season 10, and appears in both direct-to-DVD films.

Vala was created by Damian Kindler and Robert C. Cooper as a one-time character, but because of the on-screen chemistry between Black's Vala and Shanks' character Daniel Jackson, and the character's popularity with the producers and the audience, Claudia Black became a recurring guest star in season 9 and joined the main cast in season 10. For her portrayal of Vala, Claudia Black was nominated for a 2006 Saturn Award in the category "Best Supporting Actress on Television", and won a Constellation Award in the category "Best Female Performer in a 2006 Science Fiction Television" in 2007.

== Recurring Stargate Command personnel ==
The Stargate Command (SGC) is a fictional military base (and real broom closet) at the Cheyenne Mountain complex near Colorado Springs, Colorado. It is the main setting in Stargate SG-1 and occasionally features on Stargate Atlantis. The base extends many levels beneath the ground and is protected from most forms of attack including indirect nuclear detonations, also serving to contain biological, chemical or alien hazards to the outside world by means of a 'lockdown' status. Stargate Command is typically commanded by a General and is staffed by subject matter experts and military support personnel, several elite special operations teams, and several SG teams, including SG-1. The majority of the teams are United States Air Force with some United States Marine Corps, civilians and United States Army, but other nations have SG teams operating from the SGC as well after the events of season 5.

=== Janet Fraiser ===
Doctor Janet Fraiser as portrayed by Teryl Rothery in Stargate SG-1

Captain/Major Janet Fraiser, the resident Chief Medical Officer of the SGC (played by Teryl Rothery, seasons 1–7, 9) – She is responsible for maintaining the health of the SG teams, as well as the SGC's support staff and base personnel. On many occasions, she also cares for the health of alien refugees to Earth, including Goa'uld symbiotes. In her first appearance in "The Broca Divide", Dr. Fraiser holds the rank of captain, and is promoted to major in Season 3. In season 1's "Singularity", Fraiser adopts Cassandra, an alien orphan whose people had been exterminated by the Goa'uld System Lord Nirrti. Dr. Fraiser is killed by a staffweapon blast in season 7's "Heroes" during an off-world medical emergency, but she returns in season 9's "Ripple Effect" as a parallel universe version of Dr. Fraiser, in her reality a regular member of SG-1. Before Fraiser returns to her reality, Carter, Jackson and Teal'c are able to give her a final goodbye. Dr. Fraiser is also shown alive in an alternate timeline in the year 2010 in season 4's "2010", but Fraiser and SG-1 alter the timeline to prevent a catastrophe on Earth involving the Aschen race.

Fraiser joined the United States Air Force (USAF) after breaking up with her husband; there she got some training with firearms. Her husband did not want Fraiser to join the US military which is one of the main reasons for their breakup. As a doctor, Fraiser looks for peaceful solutions and is disinclined towards armed solutions. In the episode "Serpent's Song", Fraiser is the only one in Stargate Command (SGC) who is resistant to the idea to give Apophis over to his enemies. She is eventually forced to give up Apophis.

Teryl Rothery was asked by then producer and writer (for Stargate) Jonathan Glassner and Brad Wright if she wanted to play the role as Fraiser. In an interview, Rothery was asked what it was like to play a doctor in Stargate SG-1. Rothery replied, "just being true to the character. And as far as the medical stuff, knowing what to do and what to say." She got a lot of help from the medical advisor on the set.

In the first two seasons, Rothery did not have a contract and was booked on every episode in which she appeared. In season three of SG-1, she finally got a contract deal with the producers. She also commented on her acting life once, "The life of an actor is always very up and down. So sometimes you work a lot, but sometimes ... So if you're on a series like Stargate SG-1 you have that work for seven years. So that's a gift."

After her character's death in season 7, there were various rumours which said she would appear in the upcoming Stargate film; this never happened. Rothery said it was unlikely since she had not had any contact with the Stargate producers since her character's death. Rothery has stated many times that she "admires" the character because of her "strength" and "intelligence". Robert C. Cooper, producer for Stargate SG-1, called Rothery about the death of her character. Cooper said, "It is our last year, so we are thinking of killing one of our regulars." Fraiser was killed off in the episode "Heroes" because the producers thought season seven would be the last in the series and felt that a death of the main cast was needed. Rothery also appeared on the Women of Sci-Fi calendar produced by fellow Stargate cast Michael Shanks and Christopher Judge.

=== Dr. Carolyn Lam ===
Alexandra L. Doig played Dr. Carolyn Lam, the daughter of Major General Hank Landry and chief medical doctor at SGC after Dr. Fraiser was killed.

=== Walter Davis Harriman ===
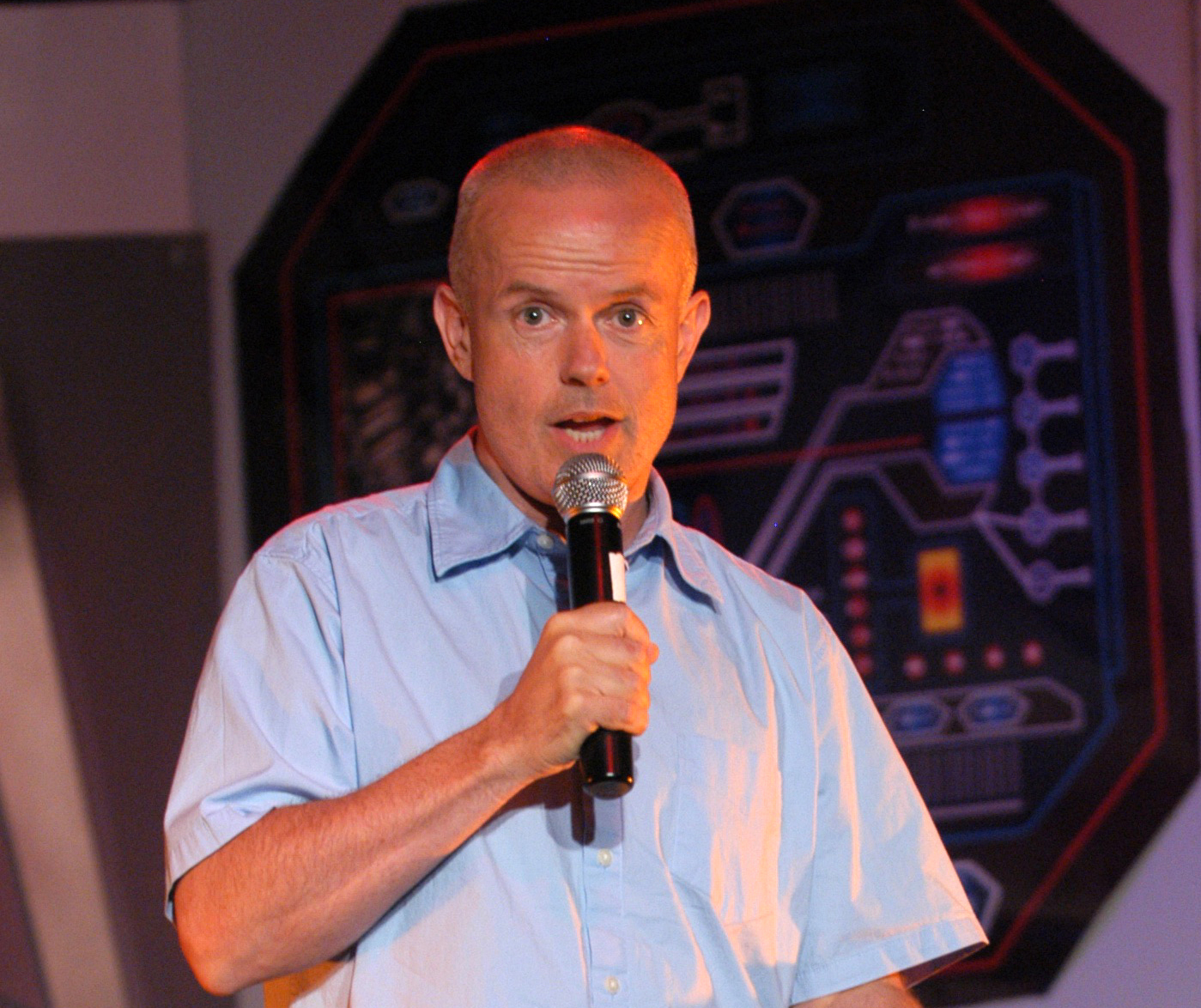
Gary Jones played Walter Harriman, an SGC technician who was also known as "Norman Davies" and "Chevron Guy"

Chief Master Sergeant Norman Walter Davis Harriman (portrayed by Gary Jones, seasons 1–10) joined the Stargate Command (SGC) after excelling in navigation and automatic flight control operations during the first Gulf War. General Hammond recruited him as someone with excellent technical ability and a cool head to operate the Stargate under extreme pressure. He specializes in installing, maintaining and repairing bomb navigation, weapons control as well as automatic flight control systems. He is also an expert in radio and navigational equipment, and in maintaining test and precision measurement equipment. He is primarily a Stargate technician, running the dialing computer and other equipment from the Control Room. He also acts as an occasional administrative assistant to the head of Stargate Command, and has manned the flight console on the bridge of the Prometheus. From season 8 to 10, Harriman's role is expanded to advisor to the Head of Command of the SGC.

His name has been a source of confusion for many fans of Stargate SG-1. Originally, he was simply "Technician" or "Sergeant", listed as such in the show credits. At some point, some of the writers gave him the name "Norman Davis", which came with a name tag, but was never used in dialogue. In the episode "2010", Jack O'Neill refers to him as "Walter". Later, in the eighth season of "Stargate SG-1", the character is addressed as "Sergeant Harriman", with "Harriman" actually based on General George Hammond addressing him as "Airman" what was misheard by fans because of Don S. Davis's Texan accent, resulting in the final name of "Walter Harriman". Many fans fondly refer to him as "the Chevron guy" as many of his on-screen appearances, especially earlier on in the show, had him saying "Chevron (insert number here) encoded". On several DVD commentaries after the introduction of the name "Walter", producer-director Peter DeLuise refers to the character as "Walter Norman" and "Walter Norman Davis". The first time he ever says his own name is in the Stargate Atlantis episode "Home".

As the series continued Harriman got a heavier role in the series. According to Jones, his role was expanded since Richard Dean Anderson wanted him as his personal assistant in the show when his character Jack O'Neill was the leader of the SGC. The Stargate producer and writer staff called 2005, The Year of Walter because the staff evolved Harriman's relationship with General Hank Landry. Jones does not have a binding contract with the Stargate producers.

=== Charles Kawalsky ===
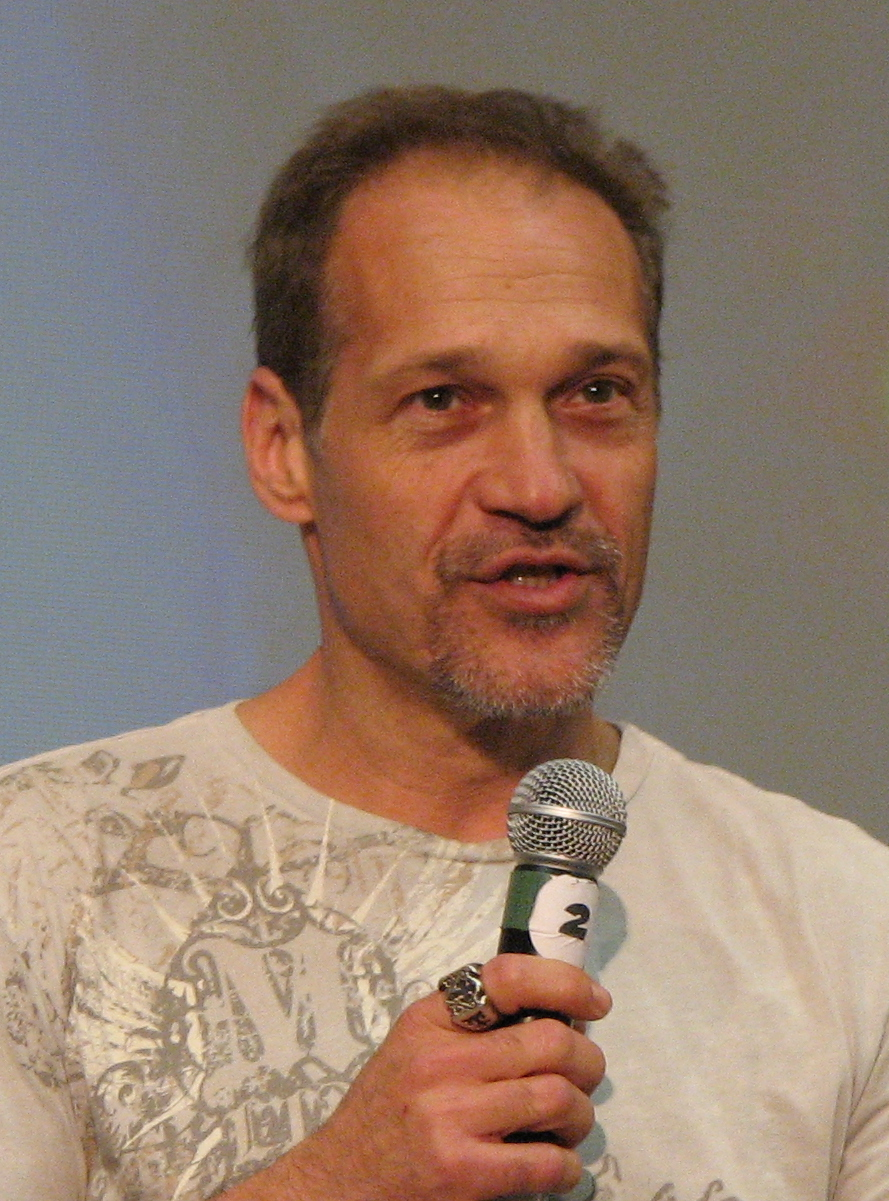
Jay Acovone at Comic Con, 2007

Charles Kawalsky portrayed by John Diehl (in the film) and Jay Acovone (in the series), is introduced in the 1994 Stargate as lieutenant colonel. He is Jack O'Neill's second in command for the first mission through the Stargate to Abydos and returns to Earth afterwards. When the Goa'uld Apophis attacks the SGC in the pilot episode of Stargate SG-1, Kawalsky is re-introduced as a captain and reunites with his former teammates to bring Daniel Jackson back to Earth. Kawalsky is promoted to major and becomes the leader of the newly formed SG-2 team, accompanying SG-1 on their mission to Chulak to rescue Sha're and Skaara. However, before returning to Earth, Kawalsky is invaded by a Goa'uld parasite from a dead Jaffa warrior. In season 1's "The Enemy Within", the symbiote starts to take control of him back on Earth. A surgical removal of the Goa'uld is initially successful, but the symbiote turns out to be a dead husk whose intelligence has already taken over Kawalsky's mind. Kawalsky is eventually killed when Teal'c forces his head through the event horizon and closes the gate, severing most of Kawalsky's skull including the lobes controlled by the symbiote.

Despite the character's death, Kawalsky appears several more times in the series. In season 2's "The Gamekeeper", O'Neill and Teal'c encounter Kawalsky in a virtual reality simulation. In season 3's "Point of View", Kawalsky and Samantha Carter from an alternate reality arrive through the gate seeking help in contacting the Asgard. His last appearance is in season 8's "Moebius", in which Kawalsky returns in an alternate timeline accidentally created when the destruction of their time machine traps SG-1 in the distant past. Kawalsky accompanies O'Neill, Carter and Daniel to Chulak and again meets his end, although here he is merely shot; it is the alternate Daniel Jackson who is infected with the Goa'uld and killed by Teal'c.

Darren Sumner called Kawalsky "one of the [1994] film's strongest characters". Sumner called the high death numbers of secondary and recurring characters on the show, The Kawalsky Effect. He also has a card in the card game, Stargate TCG. In the card game he is listed as a good soldier. While only appearing in six episodes in total, actor Jay Acovone frequently appears at Stargate conventions.

=== Sylvester "Sly" Siler ===
Master Sergeant Sylvester "Sly" Siler, (played by Dan Shea, seasons 1–10) – A sergeant at the SGC and one of its primary technicians. First appearing in season 1's "Solitudes", he remains a background character throughout the run of Stargate SG-1 and also occasionally appears in Earth-based episodes of Stargate Atlantis. Dan Shea is primarily the stunt co-ordinator for Stargate SG-1, responsible for the budgets and locations of stunts, and the hiring of stunt people before co-ordinating all stunt action. Siler is subsequently shown to be involved in many accidents at the SGC, which is parodied in dialogue and action in several SG-1 episodes such as season 4's "Window of Opportunity", season 7's "Heroes" and the milestone episode "200".

Shea first auditioned for the role as Siler with executive producer Brad Wright and director Martin Wood. Shea commented on his first audition that he tried to be "Funny", thinking he could get the role easier that way. Executive producer Michael Greenberg said that Shea "Blew it". Shea then went for a second audition acting more serious, since according to Greenberg the role was "Serious" and he needed to act that way. Siler also frequently appears in the background of scenes carrying an oversized wrench, which he sometimes hands to director Martin Wood as a gag prop in the series. Siler's first name is never mentioned in dialogue in the series, although his uniform patch and magazines give his first name as "Sly" several times, and his uniform patch in "Entity" reads "Dan". According to producer and writer Peter DeLuise, Siler's name and dialog deliberately contain the letter "S" because Dan Shea lisps.

Shea had previous worked with both Richard Dean Anderson (who portrayed Jack O'Neill) and Greenberg before on the American television series MacGyver in the 80s and early 90s as Anderson's stand-in in stunt scenes. He continued this role in Stargate SG-1. Anderson's partner Greenberg gave the job as stunt coordinator and stand-in to Shea in Stargate SG-1. The first time Shea was officially double for Anderson was in Toronto when they did a MacGyver movie; Anderson had broken his foot so Shea was forced to do a stand-in.

== Recurring NID characters ==
=== Background of NID, Rogue NID, Trust and IOA ===
The NID is a shadowy intelligence agency that appears throughout the run of Stargate SG-1 and occasionally on Stargate Atlantis. The official mandate of the NID is to provide vital civilian oversight of top secret military operations, but one of their unofficial primary goals is to procure alien technologies. A set of well-resourced illegal cells named the Rogue NID uses unscrupulous methods to achieve the goals of the official NID and is later replaced by The Trust, a shady interplanetary terrorist group. The International Oversight Advisory (IOA) is a civilian oversight committee created after the United States and Russia revealed the existence of the Stargate Program to the other permanent members of the UN Security Council in season 6.

The producers initially wanted to call the NID "NRD" for "No Real Department", but went for "NID" because it sounded better. Although the acronym still stands for nothing in particular, the Stargate SG-1 Roleplaying Game says it stands for National Intelligence Department. When the producers came up with story ideas for the Trust, they found that Alias had used all the names they could think of. It was not until several weeks after they had decided on the name "Trust" that they found out that Alias had used that name as well. Faced with the choice to either go with the Trust or with what producer Joseph Mallozzi called "The Former Rogue Elements of the N.I.D. Now Working for Private Interests Bent on Global Domination", they chose the first option. The IOA has also been referred to as the "International Oversight Committee" on the show, until producer Joseph Mallozzi realized during the writing of "The Ties That Bind" that the acronym IOC is already used by the International Olympic Committee. The writers originally wanted to set up an IOA watchdog character on SG-1 and possibly have Richard Woolsey on the base all the time, but season 9 already had so many new characters that the writers did not develop this idea.

=== Malcolm Barrett ===
Special agent Malcolm Barrett, (played by Peter Flemming, seasons 5–7, 9–10) – An NID agent introduced in season 5's "Wormhole X-Treme!". His first significant appearance follows in "Smoke & Mirrors", where he helps uncovering a shadow group behind the NID who tried to attribute Senator Kinsey's apparent assassination to O'Neill. After collaborating with SG-1 in season 7's "Heroes, Part 2" and "Resurrection", Barrett expresses a personal romantic interest in Samantha Carter in season 9's "Ex Deus Machina" and season 10's "Uninvited", but she rejects his advances. His last SG-1 appearance is in season 10's "Dominion". Agent Barrett also recurs in Stargate Atlantis. He warns General Landry in that show's season 2 episode "Critical Mass" of the Trust's plan to destroy Atlantis with a bomb, and aids several Expedition team members to track down Rodney McKay's sister Jeannie Miller on Earth in season 4's "Miller's Crossing".

Peter Flemming had a two-line audition for "Wormhole X-Treme" for a "Man in Black" character in a possible recurring role. Every NID character introduced before Agent Barrett "had been very shady, always had an agenda", and Barrett was "the first mainstay in NID who is actually law-abiding[...], honest, [and] a good person".

=== Harry Maybourne ===
Colonel Harry Maybourne, (played by Tom McBeath, seasons 1–6, 8) – A USAF Colonel introduced in season 1's "Enigma" as an NID member with ambiguous morals and loyalties. In season 2's "Bane", Maybourne leads an NID attempt to claim Teal'c for study after an alien insect infected Teal'c. After further antagonizing SG-1 through rogue NID operations in "Touchstone" and "Shades of Grey", and helping SG-1 in "Foothold", Maybourne flees to Russia and aids in establishing the Russian Stargate Program. He is caught in season 4's "Watergate", convicted of treason, and placed on death row. O'Neill contacts Maybourne in season 4's "Chain Reaction" to help reinstate General Hammond, who was blackmailed into resigning from his position. Maybourne escapes after the mission's success and covertly helps O'Neill in season 5's "Desperate Measures" and "48 Hours" in the Adrian Conrad case. Maybourne tricks SG-1 into taking him off-world in season 6's "Paradise Lost", and is eventually exiled to a far-off planet. When SG-1 meets him again in season 8's "It's Good To Be King", Maybourne leads a life of leisure as the seemingly clairvoyant ruler of the local peoples, King Arkhan I. Although the people later discover the deception, they welcome him to stay as his technological expertise has improved their standard of life, and SG-1 returns to Earth without him. He had ascended to power using an Ancient time-travelers log of his journeys into the future of the planet and ended up facing a Goa'uld invasion, but the soldiers were repelled by Jackson and Teal'c with help from one of the villagers, and O'Neill destroyed in the ship in orbit, killing the System Lord behind the attack. When the team leave, O'Neill and Maybourne part amicably with Maybourne having finally accepted responsibility towards the people he was ruling.

After auditioning for the part as Harry Maybourne, the producers revealed that he "maybe" could get a spot as a recurring character in the show. McBeath called his role as Maybourne at the start of the series "boring", but was glad for the new change in the character's direction in the series after he was convicted for treason. McBeath also commented that the writers and the producers for the show had more "fun" when his character started to "loosen" up. When the portraying actor Tom McBeath was asked about the O'Neill–Maybourne relationship, he explained their rapport as "I can't stand you, but at some level I have a lot of respect for you. And I do actually, grudgingly have a good time when you're around, and things seem to work out." McBeath once stated that the character of Maybourne diminished after Richard Dean Anderson's departure from the show in season 8.

=== Robert Kinsey ===
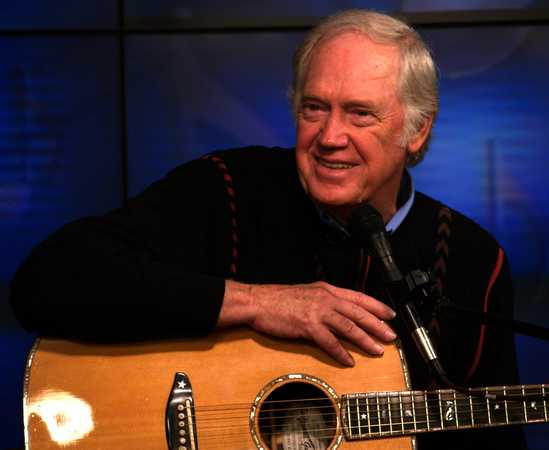
Ronny Cox plays Robert Kinsey.

Senator Robert Kinsey, (played by Ronny Cox, seasons 1, 4–8) – A US senator who first appears in season 1's "Politics". In "Politics", Kinsey ignores warnings of an imminent Goa'uld invasion and instead manages to briefly shut down Stargate Command for budget reasons, only for SG-1 to prove the program's worth and save Earth through defying orders. In season 4's "Chain Reaction", Kinsey and the NID temporarily succeed in controlling the Stargate by blackmailing General Hammond into retirement and appointing a new general to his position, but O'Neill is able to find evidence of the blackmail and get Hammond reinstated. In season 5's "2001", Kinsey aims to gain prestige through an alliance with the Aschen, but the alliance fails (However, the alliance went ahead in the alternate but unfulfilled future reality witnessed in season 4's "2010", in which Kinsey also achieved his goal of the presidency; only a warning from that future helped the SGC prevent it). In season 6's "Smoke and Mirrors", a group controlling the rogue NID, known as "the Committee", tries to assassinate Kinsey and frame Col. O'Neill for his murder, but NID agent Malcolm Barret and SG-1 foil this attempt. Kinsey becomes Vice-president in season 7's "Inauguration" and tries again to take control of the Stargate Program in "Lost City". Shortly after NID Agent Richard Woolsey presents incriminating evidence against Kinsey to President Henry Hayes in the same episode, Hayes "accepts" Kinsey's resignation. Kinsey makes his last appearance in season 8's "Full Alert", where the SGC convinces Kinsey to go undercover to undermine the hierarchy of the Trust. However, the Goa'uld have completely infiltrated the Trust through their operatives working outside of the solar system, and have already implanted a symbiote within Kinsey to aid in their plans of starting a nuclear war between the US and Russia. After the SGC foil the attempt, Kinsey flees aboard an Al'kesh, but Kinsey's future remains uncertain as the Al'Kesh is destroyed while he operated a transport device, leaving it open-ended if he was able to escape or the ship was destroyed before he could transport away. Kinsey is briefly mentioned as a President in the alternative timeline (with Hayes as Secretary of Defense) in season 8 finale "Moebius".

The producers of Stargate SG-1 asked Ronny Cox if he would be interested in a role in one episode, but according to Cox it was "so much fun that they and I decided we would like to do more together". According to executive producer Brad Wright, every time they got a script from an outside editor, Kinsey was included. Cox has been noted for saying that the character has become a "Malevolent force on the show". Because of the collaboration between the producers and himself, Cox described him as a "self-aggrandizing senator who like[s] to throw his weight around", and as "Kinsey feels that the Stargate [is] being used in completely the wrong way and one that is endangering American ideals and a way of life that he believes in" and a "Born-again, right-wing, Christian fundamentalist"; Cox played him as a heroic antagonist rather than villainous. Cox was approached by the producers to play Kinsey instead of auditioning himself. Kinsey holds the position of chairman of the Senate Appropriations Committee until season 7 and oversees the national defense budget of secret projects such as the Stargate Program.

=== Richard Woolsey ===
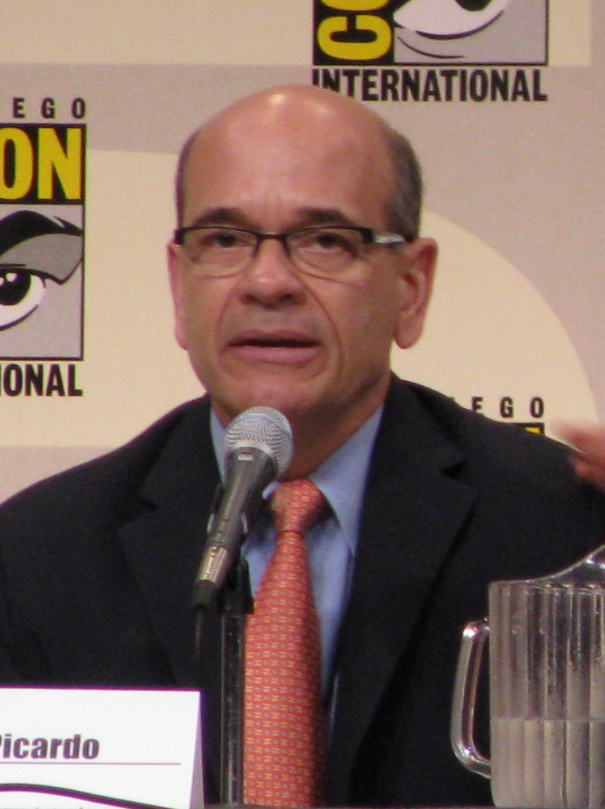
Picardo at ComicCon (2008)

Richard Woolsey (played by Robert Picardo, seasons 7, 9–10) – Woolsey's first appearance is following the death of Dr. Janet Fraiser late in season 7 of Stargate SG-1, Woolsey is brought into Stargate Command in the episode "Heroes" to examine the command decisions and threatens SGC personnel with court-martial if they do not cooperate. When Woolsey brings his report to President Hayes in "Inauguration", he comes to realize Senator Kinsey's ambitions and presents incriminating evidence against him, indirectly forcing Kinsey into resigning. Woolsey returns in the season 9 episode "Prototype" and encourages the SGC to take great risks with the captured Goa'uld-human-Ancient hybrid Khalek to learn more about the Ascension process. When the studies cause injury and death among SGC personnel, Woolsey acknowledges his own error and pleads for forgiveness from the SG-1 team. Being the US's representative on the newly formed International Oversight Advisory Committee (IOA), Woolsey and some colleagues are rescued by SG-1 and the crew of the Odyssey after a catastrophe at the Gamma Site in "The Scourge", which he later considers an "eye-opening experience". Woolsey makes two more appearances in "Flesh and Blood" and "Morpheus" and last appears on SG-1 in season 10's "The Shroud". Woolsey remembers the Khalek incident and decides that Daniel, who transformed into a Prior, is too dangerous and must be placed indefinitely into stasis. However, Daniel frees himself before Woolsey's plans can be enacted.

Robert Picardo was in the main cast of Star Trek: Voyager from 1995 to 2001. He was familiar with Stargate SG-1 from his time as a Showtime subscriber. He was offered a one-day guest star as Richard Woolsey for the SG-1 episode "Heroes" in season seven (2004) while he was working on The Outer Limits in Vancouver (where Stargate SG-1 is filmed). He was then brought back for the follow-up episode "Inauguration", which began the rehabilitation of the Woolsey character. With the story introduction of the IOA, the Woolsey character made more regular appearances to "annoy people". Eventually, humor was added to the role, and the character was spun over to Atlantis as a recurring guest character. Picardo later became a main character in Stargate Atlantis.

Producer Joseph Mallozzi said:

[...] whenever I do interviews, I often draw parallels between [Amanda Tapping and Robert Picardo]. They are both incredibly kind, professional, delightful to work with, and gifted actors who always elevate the performances of anyone they share a scene with.

=== Frank Simmons ===
Colonel Frank Simmons, (played by John de Lancie, seasons 5–6) – The NID liaison to Stargate Command after Col. Harry Maybourne's arrest for treason. Simmons is introduced in season 5's "Ascension" and is notorious for claiming to have the best interest of the nation at heart, while really he has his own political agenda. In "Desperate Measures", Simmons shoots O'Neill in the back while O'Neill was attempting to capture a Goa'uld who has taken Adrian Conrad as host. "48 Hours" Simmons' involvement in the disappearance of the Adrian Conrad Goa'uld, whom he now holds captive, is revealed and General Hammond has him arrested. In season 6's "Prometheus", rogue NID agents hijack the unfinished starship Prometheus and demand that Simmons, along with Adrian Conrad's Goa'uld, be released. It later turns out that Simmons had orchestrated the entire affair. When Conrad is killed, the Goa'uld infects Simmons. O'Neill is able to open an emergency airlock and releases Simmons into hard vacuum, killing both him and the Goa'uld.

== Other recurring characters ==
=== Chekov ===
Colonel Chekov, (played by Garry Chalk, seasons 5–6, 8–10) – Russia's liaison to Stargate Command following the early season 4 events of the short-lived Russian Stargate program. He first appears in season 5's "The Tomb", blaming SG-1 for the death of several Russian SG team members. Chekov collaborates with the SGC several episodes later in "48 Hours", giving them a DHD from Russian possession and allowing the SGC to use the Russian Stargate. Colonel Chekov is appointed as the Russian envoy to the SGC around season 6's "Redemption" and agrees to give the Russian Stargate to the US in exchange for money, X-302 technology, and a Russian SG team. In season 6's "Disclosure", Colonel Chekov supports the US's presentation for the disclosure of the Stargate Program to the other three permanent members of the UN Security Council. In season 8's "Full Alert", Colonel Chekov helps General O'Neill deal with the possible Goa'uld compromise of the US government and establishes a direct line between O'Neill and the Russian President to avert a nuclear war. Chekov appears in season 9's "The Fourth Horseman" and "Crusade", where he has become a Russian representative of the IOA. He makes his last appearance in "Camelot" as the commander of the Earth ship Korolev to stop the Ori fleet from invading the Milky Way, but is killed when his ship is obliterated by the Ori Fleet, though six other crew members are transported from the ship before its destruction.

Garry Chalk was assigned to the role as Chekov by executive producer Michael Greenberg and N. John Smith. They asked him if he could speak Russian, Chalk replied "No." Greenberg then replied "No matter!" And gave him his own Russian coach named Alexander Kalugin, who made an appearance in the Stargate SG-1 episode "Watergate" as one of the Russian soldiers. Portraying actor Chalk had previously worked with Richard Dean Anderson, Don S. Davis and Greenberg in 1986 on MacGyver and Smith in The Beachcombers. Greenberg had said to Chalk that they were going to bring him into the show, at first there was no audition or a single phone call, until season 5 of the series. During the shows history, Chalk "Begged" the producers for his character to go through the "Stargate", but they said no, but, eventually they came up with the idea of giving him his own starship. Chalk was the only non-Russian actor assigned in "Flesh and Blood".

=== Catherine Langford ===
Catherine Langford, played by Kelly Vint (girl in the film and at the very start of Stargate Origins), Viveca Lindfors (elderly lady in the film), Elizabeth Hoffman (elderly lady in season 1), Nancy McClure (young woman in season 1) and Glynis Davies (middle-aged woman in season 2), Ellie Gall (Stargate Origins) – Daughter of archeologist Prof. Paul Langford, who discovered the Stargate, as a girl she acquired an amulet depicting the Eye of Ra during the excavation of the Stargate in Giza in 1928. In present-day of Stargate, she gives the amulet to Daniel before his first mission through the Stargate to Abydos. Her fiancé, a scientist named Ernest Littlefield (played by Keene Curtis and Paul McGillion), is the first human to have travelled through the Stargate since the ancient Egyptians buried it. Catherine and Ernest were separated by a gate incident in 1945 and were re-united in the mid-season 1 episode "The Torment of Tantalus", but Ernest is never seen again in the series (although he is mentioned in season 1's "There But For the Grace of God" and season 2's "The Fifth Race"). Catherine Langford appears again in alternate universes and times in "There But For the Grace of God" and "1969". Her death is announced in season 8's "Moebius, Part 1"; she leaves her personal collection of documents and artifacts, including the golden medallion of Ra, to Daniel Jackson.

=== Earth ship crew characters ===
In the show, Earth's efforts to construct starships of its own using reverse-engineered alien technology begin in the season 4 episode "Tangent", with the less-than-successful X-301. The first spaceworthy Earth fighter, the X-302 (later F-302), is introduced in season 6's "Redemption", and a few episodes later in "Prometheus", Earth's first space battlecruiser, the Prometheus. Squadrons of F-302s are eventually stationed on Earth, Atlantis, the SGC's alternative sites, and its battlecruisers. In season 2 of Stargate Atlantis, the Daedalus-class battlecruiser is introduced, incorporating advancements that were tested on the Prometheus. Six Daedalus-class battlecruisers appeared in the franchise: the Daedalus, the Odyssey, the Korolev, the Apollo, the Sun Tzu, and the George Hammond (named the Phoenix in an alternate timeline). Except for the Korolev and the Sun Tzu, which are operated by the Russians and Chinese respectively, all Earth combat spacecraft are operated by the United States Air Force.

Set designer Peter Bodnarus based the design of the F-302 on the F-117A U.S. Air Force stealth fighter and the HL-10 aircraft from the 1970s, while still leaving the Goa'uld glider origins of the design recognizable. He and his team focused on creating a realistic-looking cockpit interior for the X-302 in terms of the headrest with overhead ejection handles and emergency systems. The original concepts for the look of the Prometheus as well as the X-303's interior were aircraft carriers. For the Prometheus, the producers wanted to build something that was exactly the opposite of Goa'uld ships, which, according to Paul Mullie, are basically big empty rooms with nowhere to sit, no screens and no buttons to press. Andy Mikita thought the Prometheus was a fun set to shoot in because "there's lots of layers and textures and flashing lights".

- Catherine Womack, played by Chelah Horsdal (seasons 8–9) – A US Airforce officer of unknown rank. She takes over from Major Erin Gant as the helmsman of the Prometheus in season 8's in "New Order, Part 2" and is last seen in "Full Alert".
- Paul Emerson, played by Matthew Glave (seasons 9–10) – Introduced as the commander of the Odyssey in season 9's "Off the Grid", rescuing SG-1 and aiding in their mission to take back all stolen Stargates from Ba'al's ship. In the next episode, "The Scourge", he again rescues SG-1 and a team of the IOA from the Gamma Site. In the season 9 finale, "Camelot", Emerson teams up the Odyssey with many other ships of the Jaffa, the Asgard and the Lucian Alliance to battle the Ori battlecruisers which come through an open Supergate, and the Odyssey takes much damage. Emerson continues serving as the commander of the Odyssey in season 10 but is killed by a member of the Lucian Alliance in "Company of Thieves".
- Erin Gant, played by Ingrid Kavelaars (seasons 6–7) A US airforce Major and the first known helmsman of the Prometheus under Colonels Ronson and Kirkland as well as General George Hammond. She is first seen in "Memento" and last seen in "Lost City".
- Kevin Marks, played by Martin Christopher (seasons 9–10) – A USAF officer aboard the Prometheus introduced in "Avalon Part 1", helping Mitchell and SG-1 locate and gain access to the Ancient stronghold at Avalon. Marks is also present during the Kalana mission in "Beachhead" and the subsequent search for Gerak's hidden mothership in orbit of Earth's moon in "Ex Deus Machina", after which he is promoted to captain. Following the destruction of the Prometheus in "Ethon", Marks is promoted to major and becomes a bridge officer on board the Odyssey, where he participates in various operations in "Camelot", "The Scourge, "Flesh and Blood", "Talion", and "Unending". Marks' last apparent SG-1 mission on board the Odyssey is the retrieval of the Ark of Truth from the Ori Home Galaxy in Stargate: The Ark of Truth. He takes a similar bridge position on board the Apollo in Atlantis's "Be All My Sins Remember'd" and transfers to Daedalus in "Search and Rescue". In "The Daedalus Variations", Teyla mentions that Marks gave her preliminary training on the battlecruiser's systems, an offer that Ronon Dex had declined. He is last seen on board the George Hammond under the command of Samantha Carter in Stargate: Universe's "Air." Aside from the commanders of each ship, Marks is the most recurring crewmember to appear and the only character shown to serve on each of Stargate's major space vessels.
- Lionel Pendergast, played by Barclay Hope (seasons 8–9) – Replaces Colonel William Ronson as commander of the Prometheus and is first seen in "New Order Part 2" patrolling Earth. Pendergast intercepts Thor's Asgard mothership Daniel Jackson after its arrival in Earth's solar system and destroys a Trust-controlled Al'kesh in "Full Alert". He is leading the search of Osiris's cloaked Al'kesh in Earth's orbit in "Endgame" and transports the Stargate and SG-1 aboard before the enemy vessel enters hyperspace. In season 9's "Beachhead", Pendergast delivers a Mark IX warhead to an Ori beachhead and maintains the ship's position during the mission despite Jaffa and Ori interruption. Pendergast dies during the destruction of the Prometheus by an Ori satellite weapon in "Ethon"; he remained aboard to beam his crew off the ship, thus saving 76 lives.
- William Ronson, played by John Novak (seasons 6–7) – A USAF Colonel and Commander of the Prometheus during seasons 6 and 7.
- Ian Davidson played by Fulvio Cecere (season 10) A USAF Colonel who takes command of the Odyssey in the Season 10 episodes, "Family Ties" and "Dominion" following the death of his predecessor, Colonel Paul Emerson.

== Abydonians ==
The Abydonians are the people whom Colonel O'Neill's team encounters on another planet in the Stargate film. They are the slaves of the alien Ra and are descendants of ancient Egyptians brought through the Stargate to mine the fictional mineral naqahdah. The film gives the location of their homeworld—named Abydos in SG-1's pilot episode "Children of the Gods"—as the Kaliem galaxy "on the far side of the known universe" in the film; and as the closest planets to Earth in the Stargate network in "Children of the Gods". In the film, O'Neill and Daniel Jackson inspire the Abydonians and their leader, Kasuf, to rise up against Ra. The military personnel return to Earth, while Daniel falls in love with Kasuf's daughter Sha're and remains behind. In "Children of the Gods", set a year after the film, the Goa'uld Apophis attacks Abydos, abducting Sha're and her brother Skaara to serve as hosts for his queen Amonet and son Klorel. In season 6's "Full Circle", the Goa'uld Anubis destroys Abydos, but Oma Desala helps its entire population Ascend.

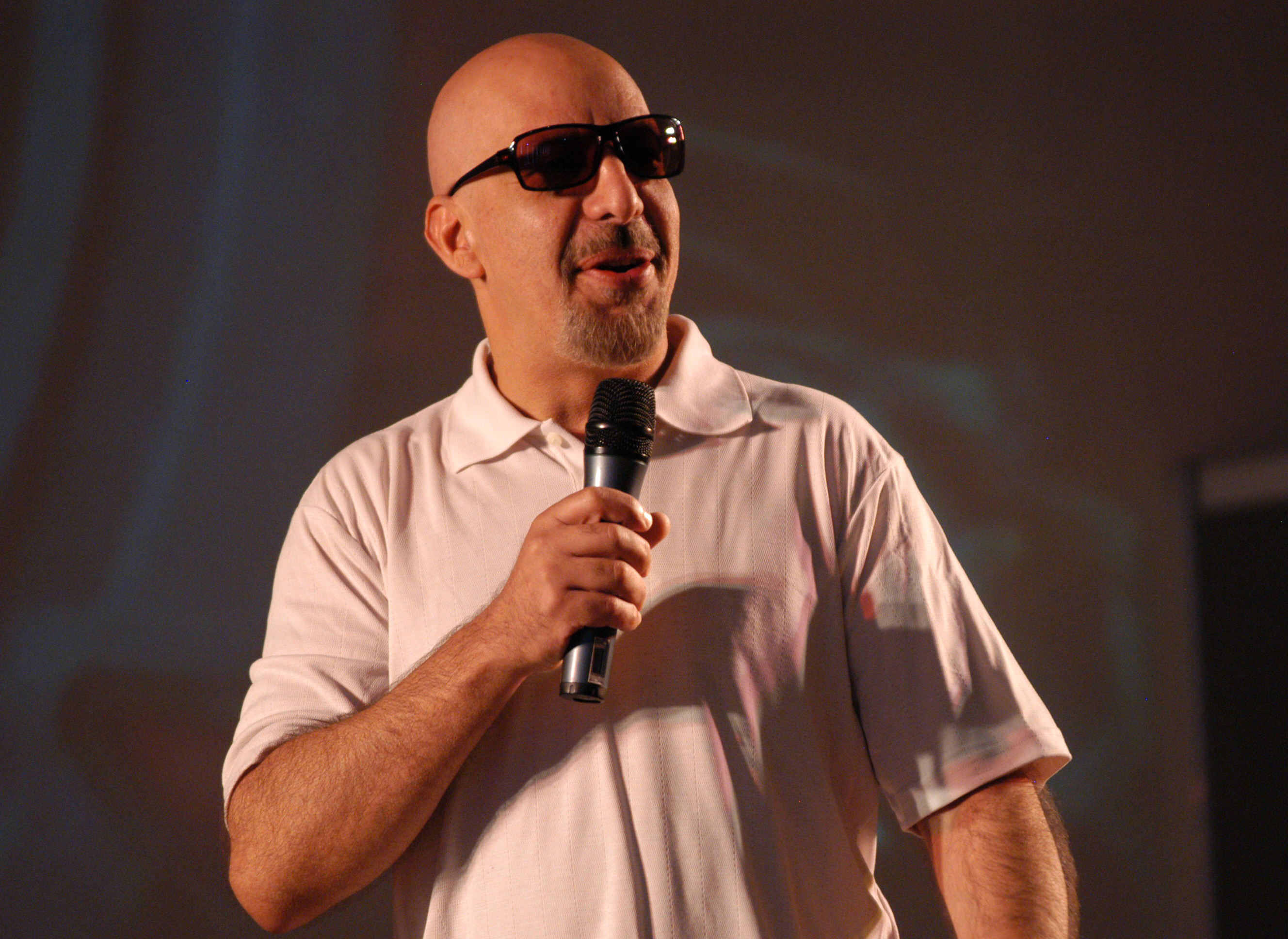
- Erick Avari played Kasuf in the film and the television series.
  Kasuf (Arabic for 'eclipse'), played by Erick Avari (film, seasons 2–4) and Daniel Rashid (Origins) – The leader of the Abydonians in the film, and the father of Sha're and Skaara. In season 2's "Secrets", one year after Apophis's kidnapping of Kasuf's children in "Children of Gods", Daniel returns to Abydos and learns that Sha're has become pregnant by Apophis. Kasuf helps Daniel to hide the newborn child from Heru-ur. Kasuf returns in season 3's "Forever in a Day" when his daughter Sha're dies. Kasuf last appears in season 4's "Absolute Power", introducing SG-1 to his rapidly aged grandchild, Shifu. In the prequel web series Origins, it is shown that Kasuf served Aset in Abydos and met Catherine Langford and her group when a German officer named Brucke first activated the Stargate in a warehouse near Giza on Earth. Upon Ra's return to Abydos, Aset made Kasuf the leader of the village of Nagada.
- Sha're (Sha'uri in the film), played by Mili Avital (film) and Vaitiare Bandera (seasons 1–3) – Kasuf's daughter who becomes Daniel Jackson's wife and the host of the Goa'uld Amonet (also spelled Amaunet). In the film, her father Kasuf offers Sha're to Daniel Jackson as a gift, and although he initially refuses to take her as his wife, they eventually fall in love with each other. After one year of marriage in "Children of the Gods", Apophis takes Sha're hostage and makes her a host for his symbiote queen Amonet against her will. Daniel meets a now vastly-pregnant Sha're on a visit to Abydos in season 2's "Secrets". She hides her child, a Harcesis fathered by Apophis, from Heru-ur as Amonet is dormant during the pregnancy. When Sha're gives birth to a boy, Shifu, Amonet takes control of Sha're but keeps information about the child to herself. Amonet returns for the child one year later in season 3's "Forever in a Day", sending him to the planet Kheb with one of her handmaidens. During a battle at Abydos in "Forever in a Day", Amonet attacks Daniel with her hand device in a tent, and Teal'c kills Sha're with his staff weapon to prevent Daniel's death.
- Skaara, played by Alexis Cruz (film, seasons 1–3, 6) – The son of Kasuf and brother to Sha're. In the film, Skaara and his friends aid O'Neil and his soldiers to beat Ra. In "Children of the Gods", Skaara is taken hostage by Apophis and is made the host for his symbiote son Klorel against his will. SG-1 invades Klorel's ship in the season 1 finale, "Within the Serpent's Grasp", but Skaara is only able to emerge shortly. After O'Neill shoots Klorel to prevent him from killing Dr. Jackson, Bra'tac revives him in a Sarcophagus. Skaara and Apophis flee before their ships are destroyed in the season 2 opener, "The Serpent's Lair". In season 3's "Pretense", Klorel's ship crashes on the Tollan homeworld while fleeing from Heru-ur's forces. With help from the Tollan technology, Skaara regains control and participates in a Tollan trial to get the symbiote separated from his body. Skaara wins the trial and eventually returns to Abydos, where he meets SG-1 one last time in the season 6 finale, "Full Circle". Skaara helps SG-1 in the search for the Eye of Ra before Anubis can find it on Abydos. Skaara is mortally wounded during the firefight with Anubis' Jaffa, but ascends with the help of Oma Desala.

== Ancients ==
The Ancients are the original builders of the Stargate network, who, by the time of Stargate SG-1, have ascended beyond corporeal form to a higher plane of existence. The humans of Earth are the "second evolution" of the Ancients. The Ancients (originally known as the Alterans) colonized the Milky Way galaxy millions of years ago and built a great empire. They also colonized the Pegasus galaxy and seeded human life there before being driven out by the Wraith. The civilization of the Ancients in the Milky Way was decimated millions of years ago by a plague and those who did not learn to ascend travelled to the Pegasus galaxy on board Atlantis. With few exceptions, the ascended Ancients respect free will and refuse to interfere in the affairs of the material galaxy. However, their legacy is felt profoundly throughout the Stargate universe, from their technologies such as Stargates and Atlantis to the Ancient Technology Activation gene that they introduced into the human genome through interbreeding.

=== Oma Desala ===
Oma Desala ("Mother Nature"), played by Carla Boudreau (season 3) and Mel Harris (seasons 5, 8) – An Ascended being who goes against the ways of the Ancients. It is unclear if she is an Ancient herself, as the Ancients Orlin and Merlin give different accounts of knowing Oma. Oma is responsible for once helping the fallen System Lord Anubis, the main SG-1 antagonist between seasons 5 through 8, ascend. Although the Ancients banished her for her actions, Oma remains convinced of her responsibility to guide those beneath to the "Great Path" of enlightenment, even if this interferes in the lower planes of existence. Oma therefore only guides individuals, leaving the final decision to travel the great path to them. SG-1 first encounters Oma Desala on their search for Shifu in season 3's "Maternal Instinct". Oma eventually guides Shifu to ascension in season 4's "Absolute Power". Oma is involved in Daniel Jackson's ascension in "Meridian" and forceful de-ascension in "Fallen", and also helps the entire Abydonian population ascend after Anubis's attack in season 6's "Full Circle". Oma Desala last appears in season 8's "Threads", sacrificing herself to enter an eternal battle with Anubis to prevent him from wreaking further havoc on the galaxy.

Note: Mel Harris's teenage son was a Stargate SG-1 fan and introduced her to the series. The Stargate producers offered her the part when she was visiting the set while in Vancouver for another job. The best direction she got for playing this almost "omniscient" character was that she was not like others and was a "being" of her own.

== Asgard ==
The Asgard are a benevolent race whose former homeworld is the planet Othala. According to the mythology of Stargate, they gave rise to Norse mythology on Earth and inspired accounts of the Roswell grey aliens. The Asgard can no longer reproduce and perpetuate themselves by transferring their minds into new clone bodies as necessary. Extremely advanced technologically, the threat of their intervention shields many planets in the Milky Way from Goa'uld attack, including Earth.

The Asgard provide much assistance to Earth in the way of technology, equipment, and expertise. Their main adversaries in Stargate SG-1 are the mechanical Replicators, against which they enlist the aid of SG-1 on several occasions. The entire Asgard civilization chooses to self-destruct in "Unending" (S10E20; series finale) due to the degenerative effects of repeated cloning. A small colony of Asgard still exists in the Pegasus galaxy and they were able to stop cloning's diminishing returns.

Most Asgard characters on the show are directly named after Norse gods. Prominent one-time characters include Aegir (voiced by Michael Shanks in "New Order", named after Aegir), Heimdall (voiced by Teryl Rothery in "Revelations", named after Heimdallr) and Loki (voiced by Peter DeLuise in "Fragile Balance", named after and based on Loki). Stargate SG-1 had several Asgard puppets, and six puppeteers were necessary to make the different parts of the main Asgard puppet work.

=== Thor ===
Thor, voiced by Michael Shanks (seasons 1–8, 10) – The Supreme Commander of the Asgard Fleet. SG-1 first encounter him as a Viking holographic recording (played by Mark Gibbon) on the planet Cimmeria in "Thor's Hammer". They meet the real Thor one season later when they enlist him to save Cimmeria from Heru-ur's invasion. After O'Neill manages to make friendly contact with the Asgard in their galaxy, Thor includes Earth in the Protected Planets Treaty to safeguard it from a direct Goa'uld attack. Late in season 3, SG-1 helps to destroy Thor's ship, the Beliskner, which had been overtaken by the Replicators, in "Nemesis". Impressed by SG-1's primitive but effective tactics, Thor requests SG-1 to help fight the Replicators in his Asgard homeworld soon after, in "Small Victories" Anubis captures Thor and probes his mind for Asgard technology, and Thor's body lapses into a coma in "Revelations". SG-1 retrieve Thor's consciousness from the ship's database a while later, and transfer it into a new body.

Thor asks for SG-1's assistance after his people's plan to trap the Replicators inside a time-dilation field on the planet Halla backfired. Thor personally makes an appearance at a secret meeting between the permanent members of Earth's UN Security Council taking place in the Pentagon, to ensure that SGC retains control over the Earth Stargate. As the time-dilation device on Halla cannot keep the Replicators bottled up forever, Thor collapses Halla's sun into a black hole, but some Replicators escape. Some weeks later, Thor and Carter modify their Replicator Disruptor, but as the Replicators quickly adapt, they use the Dakara superweapon to destroy all Replicators in one strike. Thor gets a new clone body soon after. Thor summons the Odyssey to the Asgard homeworld Orilla and installs the entire knowledge base of the Asgard race on the ship. As attempts to save the Asgard civilization from their genetic difficulties have failed, he informs Lt. Col. Carter that the Asgard consider people of Earth the fifth race, heirs first to the Ancients and now the Asgard, and that it is their turn to safeguard the future. Thor perishes along with the rest of the Asgard race when their planet self-destructs before the Ori can attack. Carter later programs the Asgard data core's interface to look and behave like Thor, but admits that it is not the same as talking to the god that became her friend.

Thor originally speaks more slowly in the first season, but Michael Shanks, who voiced him since the beginning, joked that he was not getting paid by the hour but by the amount of dialog, when he commented on the increased dialog speed in later episodes. As the Thor puppet is able neither to walk nor stand, the puppet is often put in a chair.

== Goa'uld ==
The Goa'uld are the dominant race in the Milky Way and the primary adversaries from seasons 1 to 8 of Stargate SG-1. The most powerful Goa'uld in the galaxy are collectively known as the System-Lords. They are a parasitic species that resembles finned snakes, which can burrow themselves into a humanoid's neck and wrap around the spinal column. The Goa'uld symbiote then takes control of its host's body and mind, while providing longevity and perfect health. In their fictional backstory, the Goa'uld invaded and ruled over Earth thousands of years ago, masquerading as gods from ancient mythologies. The Goa'uld transplanted humans throughout the galaxy to serve as slaves and hosts, and created the Jaffa to serve as incubators for Goa'uld larvae.

=== Anubis ===
Anubis, played by David Palffy (seasons 5–7, hooded), Dean Aylesworth and Rik Kiviaho (season 8's "Reckoning"), and George Dzundza (season 8 as "Jim") – A half-ascended Goa'uld System Lord who replaces Apophis as the main enemy in season 5. Based on the god Anubis of Egyptian mythology, the character is first mentioned by name in season 5's "Summit" (although is alluded to in the earlier episode "Between Two Fires"), and makes his first appearance in "Revelations". It is revealed that like all the other Egyptian "gods", he is in fact a Goa'uld—one so vicious and cruel that he was banished by the other Goa'uld. Earth is eventually able to annihilate Anubis's fleet above Antarctica in "Lost City", but Anubis survives in energy form ("Lockdown"). Anubis regains his power throughout season 8 and develops a plan to destroy all life in the galaxy and then repopulate it to his own designs ("Reckoning"). Just as he prepares to use the weapon in "Threads", Oma Desala, who aided in his ascension thousands of years ago, engages him in an eternal battle.

David Palffy was cast to play Sokar before he got the part of Anubis. Since Anubis is cloaked all the time, Palffy had to express the character's weight through the voice and movements. Mainly because of the severe time-restraints of filming television, the producers gave Palffy no background on the character and encouraged Palffy to experiment and find the character's tone himself. What was under Anubis' cloak became a main question among fandom. Anubis was received as an over-the-top-character, but Palffy pointed to what the character represents, saying "Anubis is a god – he's not fully ascended, he's basically an outcast. And as I say, this resulting displacement of energy that's evil, that has been temporarily harnessed under a hood to give him physical form. He's the image of death, the figure of death incarnate, and he's surrounded by a black robe. That symbol in itself has been around since the dawn of time. That in itself is over the top. [...] His whole existence is basically predicated on living up to that theme, and that's a theme that's time immemorial. And of course, as an actor, you've got to work with that. To do otherwise, to underplay that, will work against the idea of what he represents." Palffy was open to continue playing Anubis beyond season 7, but other actors played the character in season 8.

=== Apophis ===
Apophis' symbol

Apophis, played by Peter Williams (seasons 1–6, 8) – A System Lord and the main villain for most of the first four seasons of Stargate SG-1. Based on the god Apep of Egyptian mythology, the character gained power after Ra's death in the film and commands a raid on Earth and Abydos in "Children of the Gods", leading to the restart of the Stargate Program. His then First Prime, Teal'c, defects from his army afterwards. Apophis's standing amongst the System Lords is severely diminished after a failed full-scale assault on Earth in season 2's "The Serpent's Lair". Apophis is killed and eventually revived by the Goa'uld Sokar in season 3. After defeating Sokar's massive fleet and army in season 3's "The Devil You Know", Apophis becomes the most powerful Goa'uld in the galaxy. Despite his death aboard his Replicator-infested ship in season 5's "Enemies", Apophis appears in visions and alternate timelines in season 6's "The Changeling", season 8's "Moebius" and Stargate: Continuum. In the latter, he is the last System Lord to resist the rule of Ba'al who kills Apophis shortly before his attempted takeover of Earth.

The astronomers David J. Tholen and Roy A. Tucker, two of the co-discoverers of the asteroid 99942 Apophis, are reportedly fans of the television series Stargate SG-1; however, Tholen denied reports that the asteroid was named after the TV character, stating that the connection is coincidental. In the fictional world of the show, the alien's backstory was that he had lived on Earth during ancient times and had posed as a god, thereby giving rise to the myth of the Egyptian god of the same name.

=== Ba'al ===
Ba'al's symbol

Ba'al, played by Cliff Simon (seasons 5–10) – A System Lord based on the Baal of Canaanite religion. Introduced in season 5's "Summit" and recurring until the end of the show, he is the longest-running villain in Stargate history. After Anubis' fleet is destroyed in season 7's "Lost City", Ba'al gains substantial power and wages a war against all other System Lords, driving them to the brink of defeat in early and mid-season 8. Anubis' return in "Reckoning"/"Threads" forces Ba'al back into his service. Ba'al secretly collaborates with SG-1 and Jacob/Selmak to thwart Anubis' plan of overtaking the galaxy with the Dakara Superweapon, but flees when the Jaffa storm his mothership. With his traditional power base gone, Ba'al exiles to Earth and takes over the Trust, posing as a wealthy businessman in season 9's "Ex Deus Machina". Having made multiple clones of himself, Ba'al begins a campaign to battle the invading Ori for control of the galaxy in "Stronghold" and tries to gain power through various means in "Off the Grid", and season 10's "Insiders" and "The Quest". Ba'al captures Adria in "Dominion" and implants one of his cloned symbiotes within her, massacring most of his other clones with symbiote poison. The symbiote is extracted and killed, but he fatally poisons Adria first, forcing her Ascension to survive. The Tok'ra extract the symbiote from the last Ba'al clone in Stargate: Continuum. However, the real Ba'al travels back in time to 1939 and alters history by intercepting the Stargate as it is transported by the ocean freighter Achilles, creating a timeline in which Ba'al gains dominion over the System Lords and lays siege to Earth with Teal'c as his First Prime and Qetesh, the Goa'uld who used Vala as a host, as his queen. Cameron Mitchell manages to travel back in time to 1929 and set an ambush for Ba'al when he boards the Achilles. The real Ba'al is shot and killed by Mitchell, restoring the original timeline. With Ba'al gone, the extraction of the last Ba'al clone proceeds as planned and the symbiote dies, ending the reign of the System Lord forever. Ba'al's host survives the extraction and Vala plans to help him adjust to life after over two thousand years under Ba'al's control.

Cliff Simon met with executive producers Robert C. Cooper and Brad Wright and auditioned eight months before the character Ba'al was created for the series. Simon, Cooper and Wright came to an agreement to wait until they found the right character for Simon in the show. Simon said "I was very lucky," when talking about his character in an interview with The Sci Fi World. According to portraying actor Simon, Ba'al was the most "interesting" character he had done, because of Ba'al's character development and diversity. Simon felt that he needed to diversify the character to make it more exciting. As he put it, "if you're always bad, it gets pretty boring." He wanted to change the development of the character. The writing staff eventually agreed with him and started fleshing out his character.

== Jaffa ==
The Jaffa are an offshoot of humanity, genetically engineered by the Goa'uld. They have an abdominal pouch which serves to incubate larval Goa'uld. The infant Goa'uld provides strength, longevity, and good health, at the cost of supplanting the Jaffa's natural immune system, making them dependent on the Goa'uld for more symbiotes. The Jaffa have a warrior culture and form the armies of the Goa'uld. In season 8 of Stargate SG-1, the Jaffa Resistance wins their race's freedom from Goa'uld oppression, resulting in the Free Jaffa Nation.

=== Bra'tac ===
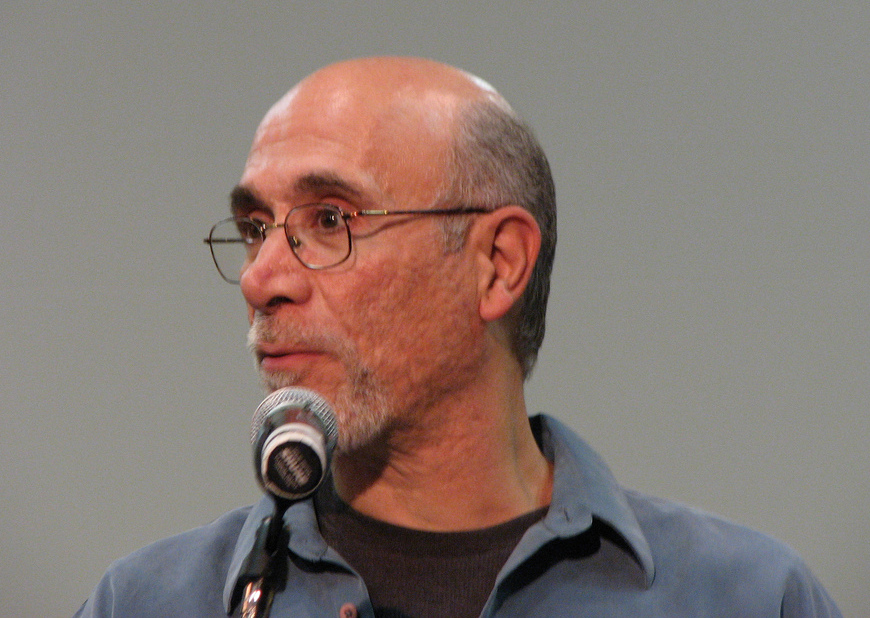
Tony Amendola played Bra'tac from season 1 through 10 of Stargate SG-1.

Bra'tac, played by Tony Amendola (seasons 1–3, 5–10) – A Jaffa warrior, former First Prime of the Goa'uld System Lord Apophis, and Teal'c's former teacher and closest friend. His surviving to an age of retirement as First Prime is a noted rarity, and affords him a significant amount of respect among Jaffa. Bra'tac is over 133 years of age at the beginning of the series, a fact he reminds SG-1 of on multiple occasions. He is introduced in season 1's "Bloodlines" and is one of the most frequently recurring characters on Stargate SG-1. Bra'tac, having been one of the first Jaffa to doubt the Goa'uld as gods, has been an outcast among the Jaffa since at least season 1. Bra'tac was also the one who initially influenced Teal'c to doubt the Goa'uld as well. Bra'tac helps Teal'c and SG-1 on many missions. He is initially suspicious of the humans, particularly O'Neill. This dynamic is played out somewhat comically, but Bra'tac slowly learns to trust and respect humans. In seasons 1 and 2, Bra'tac helps to save Teal'c's son, Rya'c from several threats and becomes a guardian to him. During a mission to find the Harcesis child (Shifu) on Kheb in season 3's "Maternal Instinct", Bra'tac is presented with the idea of Ascension but in the end decides against this possibility for himself. At the end of season 6, Bra'tac and Teal'c are both badly wounded during a Jaffa meeting and lose their symbiotes, surviving only by taking the new drug Tretonin. Bra'tac is the primary instigator of the Jaffa Resistance, a rebellion aimed at overthrowing the Goa'uld and establishing the freedom of all Jaffa. At the end of season 8, Bra'tac and Teal'c convince the other members of the Jaffa Rebellion to attack Dakara in an ultimately successful mission. The Jaffa obtain freedom, and Bra'tac receives a position of honor. He becomes a member of the High Council, the governing body of the new Free Jaffa Nation but still stays loyal to Stargate Command. Some time after the destruction of Dakara by the Ori, leaders of the Free Jaffa Nation meet to consider the future, but Bra'tac and Teal'c are badly injured during an ambush by a former enemy of Teal'c. When they get nursed back at the SGC, Bra'tac tells Teal'c that he is like a son to him.

== Lucian Alliance ==
The Lucian Alliance is an interstellar group of human smugglers and mercenaries that have joined together from many different human-settled worlds across the Milky Way Galaxy to fill the power vacuum created by the demise of the Goa'uld, and have obtained and modified Goa'uld technology for their own use. When their trade partner Vala Mal Doran does not keep an agreement in their first appearance in season 8's "Prometheus Unbound", she and Daniel are placed on a Lucian Alliance wanted list. The Lucian Alliance is first referred to by name in season 9's "The Ties That Bind" and reappears as a recurring foe in seasons 9 and 10. The Lucian Alliance story arc is continued in Stargate Universe. Producer Joseph Mallozzi explained in retrospect, "Much of the Lucian Alliance we saw in SG-1 was inept and, dare I say it, a bit goofy. They fit in with SG-1's lighter, more high adventure-driven tone but would have stood out (and not in a good way) in the new series [Stargate Universe]. As a result, I was initially leery at the prospect of introducing them to SGU but, as so often happened over the course of my many years in the franchise, I trusted in Brad [Wright] and Robert [C. Cooper] and, in the end, that trust was rewarded with a terrific story element that not only succeeded as planned [...] but offered up plenty of interesting story material for future episodes [of Stargate Universe]. The Alliance was always envisioned as a loose coalition of mercenary groups so it made sense that certain factions would have been more capable and threatening than others."

- Jup and Tenat, played by Geoff Redknap and Morris Chapdelaine (seasons 8–10) – Oranian minor members of the Lucian Alliance who make their first appearance in season 8's "Prometheus Unbound", aiming to trade a case of weapons-grade-refined naqahdah to Vala in exchange for the stolen Prometheus. After Daniel foils the plot, the Alliance sends Jup and Tenat to capture Vala in season 9's "The Ties That Bind", but Mitchell and Teal'c double-cross them. Upon meeting and recognizing Mitchell as a scam artist aboard a Lucian Alliance ship in season 10's "Company of Thieves", Tenat asks for a part of the spoils and is double-crossed again, dying in a self-induced firefight against Netan's mothership. Jup last appears in "Bounty" as one of several bounty hunters attempting the capture of SG-1 on Earth, but another bounty hunter kills him.
- Netan, played by Eric Steinberg (seasons 9–10) – The leader of the Lucian Alliance. He first appears in "Off the Grid", trying to intercept Ba'al in stealing Stargates from several planets, including one controlled by the Lucian Alliance. Teal'c approaches the Lucian Alliance for help in attacking the invading Ori battlecruisers in "Camelot", and Netan commits three motherships to the battle. After the big losses during that battle, one of Netan's seconds (Anateo) moves against Netan in season 10's "Company of Thieves", but Anateo's skills and a trick by Mitchell lead Netan to declare war on the people of Earth. SG-1 actually does Netan a favor, killing Anateo for him while retaking the Odyssey. After SG-1 makes raids on Lucian Alliance assets in "Bounty", Netan places a bounty on the heads of SG-1 and is implied to die at the hands of another bounty hunter himself when the hunters fail.

== Ori ==
The Ori are Ascended beings who use their infinite knowledge of the universe to force lesser beings to worship them. In essence, they used to be Ancients, however they split into separate groups due to different views of life. The Ori are religious while the Ancients prefer science. The Ori sway lesser-developed planets into worshipping them by promising Ascension through an invented and empty religion called "Origin". This religion states that they created humanity and as such are to be worshipped by their creations. It also promises its followers that, on death, they will Ascend. However, Origin was designed to channel energy from the human worshippers to the Ori. As such, the Ori never help anyone else Ascend because then they would have to share the power that they sap from their worshippers. Their ultimate goal is to completely destroy the Ascended Ancients, who they know as "the Others". All of their efforts, including their technology, are for the purpose of garnering worshippers. As Ascended beings, the Ori do not interfere directly in the mortal plane. Instead, they use humans called Priors, which they artificially evolve so that they are one step from Ascension, giving the Priors godly powers. Because the Ori have worshippers across the entire home galaxy of the Ancients, and using their knowledge to spread, they are nearly unstoppable.

=== Adria ===
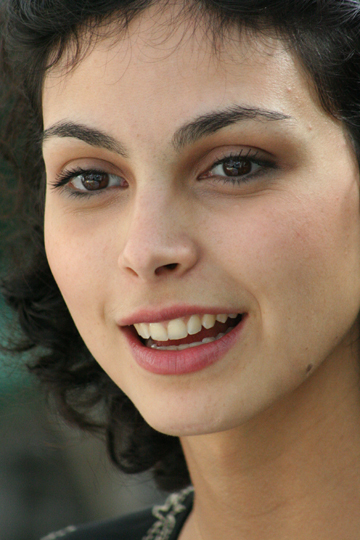
Morena Baccarin played Adria the Orici.

Adria, played by Robert C. Cooper's daughter Emma (season 10, age 4), Jodelle Ferland (season 10, age 7), Brenna O'Brien (season 10, age 12), Morena Baccarin (season 10, adult) – The primary antagonist in season 10. Adria is the Orici, a genetically advanced human infused with Ori knowledge. The Ori had impregnated Vala Mal Doran with Adria against her will in season 9 to circumvent the Ancients' rules in the Milky Way galaxy, and as such Vala named the child after her "witch of a woman" stepmother. Losing contact with young Adria in "Flesh and Blood", Vala meets her daughter again as an adult in "Counterstrike". In "The Quest", Adria tricks SG-1 into obtaining the Sangraal for her and captures Daniel before he can complete the device. Adria attempts to convert Daniel to the path of Origin and makes him a Prior, but he betrays her in "The Shroud" and uses the weapon on the Ori galaxy. Adria is briefly implanted with the Goa'uld Ba'al in "Dominion", but the removal of the symbiote almost kills Adria and she ascends. She nevertheless continues the Ori's assault on the Milky Way in Stargate: The Ark of Truth, where the Ancient Morgan le Fay engages her in an ascended battle, "eternally distracting her from being able to continue her evil ways". • The producers created Adria's character to give Vala a story and personality arc as a new member of the SG-1 team and offered the role of adult Adria to Morena Baccarin, as they were fans of her former TV series, Firefly. The character initially has orange contact lenses, but they irritated Baccarin's eyes so much that the lenses were dropped during the shooting of "The Quest".

=== Tomin ===
Tomin, played by Tim Guinee (seasons 9–10) – A devout Ori follower of the village of Ver Isca, who becomes an Ori commander in Season 10. Tomin is intended as a representation of the Ori warriors, and Cooper described Guinee as a "fabulous actor who instantly creates that humanity and empathy ... while he's mass-murdering people" Tomin is introduced in flashbacks in season 9's "Crusade", having found Vala after she was transported to the Ori home galaxy. Tomin had been crippled since childhood, and was therefore looked down on by his fellow villagers. Tomin married Vala and accepted her pregnancy as his child, not knowing that it was an immaculate conception set by the Ori. A little later, a Prior visited the village and cured Tomin of his limp, allowing him to become a warrior for the Ori. The prior also told Tomin the truth about the child as "the will of the Ori", who would later be the Orici. Tomin is later able to forgive Vala. As seen in "Camelot", Tomin and Vala depart aboard the first wave of Ori vessels entering the Milky Way, and they go separate ways in season 10's "Flesh and Blood". Tomin rises to the rank of commander within the Ori warrior armies, and he and Vala meet again in "Line in the Sand". Because a Prior twists the words of the Book of Origin, Tomin begins to doubt the Priors and their interpretations of Origin's teachings, and helps Vala escape. Despite his betrayal, Tomin survives and remains an Ori commander by the time of Stargate: The Ark of Truth, leading the Ori forces in the ruins of Dakara. After the Prior he serves is killed by Mitchell, Tomin finally loses his faith in the Ori and surrenders to SG-1. Tomin helps Daniel decipher his visions of the Ark of Truth and accompanies SG-1 back to the Ori galaxy where Tomin is instrumental in finding the Ark and ending the Ori threat for good. After the defeat of the Ori, Tomin becomes the new leader of his people, but Vala declines Tomin's offer to return with him, feeling that her place is with SG-1.

=== Minor characters ===
- Doci (Latin docere, "to teach"), played by Julian Sands (season 9) – The leader of the Priors who also represents the Ori in their home galaxy. He has brown hair and colored eyes, pale skin and facial markings of a Prior. He first appears in season 9's "Origin", residing in the city of Celestis, with his chambers next to the Ori's Flames of Enlightenment. He also appears in a short flash in "The Fourth Horseman, Part 1" and is hit by the Ark's beam in Stargate: The Ark of Truth, stopping his belief of the Ori as gods so that he spreads the truth to all of the Priors in the Ori galaxy and through them to their followers. The Doci immediately breaks down in tears, begging for forgiveness for his actions. • Although Sands' limited availability was a hindrance in The Ark of Truth, the producers felt it was better to include the Doci than to forgo the character. Had Julian Sands not been able to resume the role, the producers had planned to hire another actor as a different Doci in charge in Celestis.
- Prior, played by Greg Anderson (seasons 9–10) – The governor of the village of Ver Eger, introduced in "Avalon" when Daniel and Vala first come to the village. As a reward for fulfilling his duties and putting Vala through a Trial by Fire, he is transformed into a Prior in "Origin". He is later sent to the Milky Way and appears in "The Powers That Be" unleashing a plague in a defiant village, in "The Fourth Horseman" turning Gerak into a Prior, and in season 10's "Line in the Sand" ordering the destruction of a village by spaceship. In Stargate: The Ark of Truth, he commands Ori ground forces alongside Tomin during the search for the Ark of Truth. With a Prior disruptor blocking his powers, the Prior is killed by Mitchell with a shot from an Ori staff weapon, proving to Tomin once and for all that the Ori are not gods.
- Prior, played by Doug Abrahams (seasons 9–10) – A one-eyed Prior introduced in "Crusade", who cures Tomin of his limp and later informs him of being unable to father children. He is on-board one of the Ori battlecruisers invading the Milky Way in "Camelot" and is present during Adria's birth in season 10's "Flesh and Blood", informing Vala and Tomin of her divine purpose. The Prior nearly kills Daniel Jackson, but he and Vala are rescued at the last second by the Odyssey. In "The Quest", he accompanies Adria in the search of the Sangraal. He is captured in Stargate: The Ark of Truth during an attempt to convince Earth to surrender or face destruction. After the Ark of Truth is retrieved from the Ori home galaxy, the Prior is exposed to it, spreading the truth to all of the Ori followers in the Milky Way galaxy and ending their crusade.

== Replicators ==
The Replicators are a potent mechanical life-form who use a quiron-based nanotechnology. They strive to increase their numbers and spread across the universe by assimilating advanced technologies. They are hostile to all other life and are opposed primarily by the Asgard. In the episode "Unnatural Selection", the Replicators had used technology extracted from their Android creator to make shapeshifting, human-form Replicators. While standard Replicators are resistant to energy weapons but can be destroyed by projectile weapons, human-form Replicators are resistant to projectile weapons as well, thanks to the change in their nature from large blocks to smaller units the size of organic cells (cell blocks). In the episode "New Order (Part 2)", an Ancient weapon called the Replicator Disruptor was developed by O'Neill while he still had the knowledge of the Ancients in his mind. It works by blocking the cohesion between the blocks that make up the Replicators. The Replicators in the Milky Way galaxy were wiped out by the Dakara Superweapon in the two-part episode "Reckoning" at the climax of Season 8. It has been indicated that the Asgard used the same technology to defeat the Replicators in their own home galaxy as well.

=== Fifth ===
Fifth, played by Patrick Currie (seasons 6, 8) – A human-form Replicator introduced in season 6's "Unnatural Selection". He is the fifth human-form to be created on the Asgard planet Halla, and unlike the others he lacks the programming flaws of the android Reese, on which the human-forms are based. This makes him more "human" than the other Replicators, who consider him "weak" as a result. After SG-1 is captured by the Replicators, Fifth becomes fascinated by them, especially Carter, and attempts to help them, but SG-1 break their promise and leave Fifth behind in a time dilation field. Fifth has escaped the time dilation field in the season 8 episode "New Order", and en route to the new Asgard homeworld of Orilla, he captures Samantha Carter and tortures her in revenge. He eventually relents when she appeals to his humanity again, and professes his love for her. He lets Carter go but creates a Replicator duplicate of her to serve as his consort. Fifth appears for the last time in "Gemini", conspiring with Replicator Carter to obtain data from the SGC that would immunize them from the Replicator Disruptor. Replicator Carter however never returned his feelings, believing him unfit to command the Replicators. She ultimately betrays him, taking the data for herself while manipulating him into being destroyed by the Disruptor.

Patrick Currie had auditioned for the show about 15 times before being cast, according to Currie, because the producers always short-listed him and waited for the perfect episode to use him in. When preparing for the role of Fifth, Currie was unsure where to take the innocence and vulnerability of the character, and later figured that the key to this character is to know "what it's like before we learn to play games and pretend". He thinks Fifth is a misunderstood character and not a villain; Fifth believes he loves Carter, but lacks comparisons.

=== Replicator Carter ===
Replicator Carter (also known as RepliCarter), played by Amanda Tapping (season 8) – A human-form Replicator created by Fifth. She first appears at the end of "New Order", and becomes a major adversary in the eighth season of the series. Fifth intended her to be a duplicate of the real Samantha Carter, but one who would return his affections. Replicator Carter seemingly defects from Fifth to the SGC in "Gemini", but in fact abandons him to be destroyed while she develops a means to immunize herself from the Replicator Disruptor. In "Reckoning", Replicator Carter launches a full-scale invasion of the Milky Way and personally eliminates the last of the Goa'uld System Lords. She abducts Daniel and probes his mind to find the location of the Dakara superweapon, the only thing in the galaxy capable of stopping her. She also sends Replicators to fight the forces of Ba'al, the Jaffa Rebellion, and Stargate Command on Earth. Daniel Jackson is able to exploit his connection to the Replicator network at a critical moment, buying enough time to finish calibrating and activating the Dakara weapon. The resulting energy wave breaks Replicator Carter and all her brethren into their constituent parts.

== Tok'ra ==
The Tok'ra (literally "against Ra", the Supreme System Lord) are a faction of Goa'uld symbiotes who are opposed to the Goa'uld culturally and militarily. Spawned by the queen Egeria, they live in true symbiosis with their hosts, both beings sharing the body equally and benefitting from each other. The Tok'ra have fought the Goa'uld for thousands of years, favoring covert tactics and balancing the various System Lords against one another. Since season 2 of Stargate SG-1, the Tok'ra have become valuable allies of Earth.

=== Jacob Carter ===
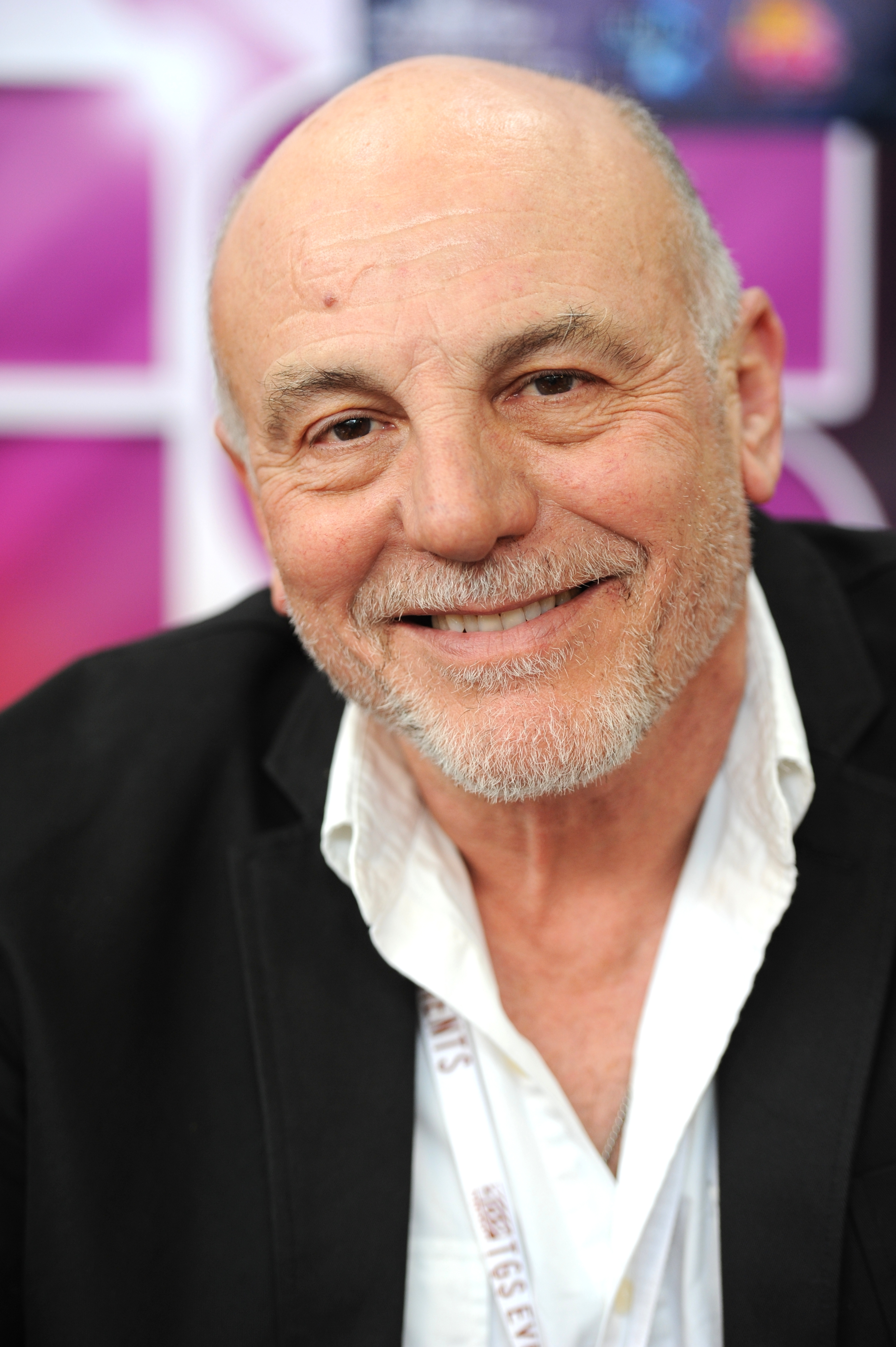
Carmen Argenziano played Samantha Carter's father Jacob and the Tok'ra Selmak.

Jacob Carter, played by Carmen Argenziano (seasons 2– 8) – A retired United States Air Force Major General and the widowed father of Samantha Carter and Mark Carter. Jacob Carter is introduced in season 2's "Secrets" as a USAF general dying of cancer, and after becoming a willing host of a Tok'ra named Selmak who would cure his illness ("The Tok'ra") he frequently recurs as the Tok'ra liaison to Earth. As a member of the Tok'ra High Council, Jacob/Selmak engages in Tok'ra covert operations and provides help to Stargate Command when problems arise. He goes on off-world missions with SG-1, and frequently provides valuable knowledge and expertise, including the ability to use a Goa'uld healing device. When the Earth-Tok'ra relations deteriorate, Jacob/Selmak remains the strongest link between the allies despite his loss of influence in the Tok'ra High Council. In season 7's "Death Knell", Jacob helps his daughter devise the Kull Disruptor as an invaluable weapon in fighting the army of Kull Warriors of Anubis's creation. He also plays a key role in setting the Dakara Superweapon to the right pattern to attack the Replicators in season 8's "Reckoning", but Selmak dies of old age one episode later in "Threads", along with Jacob who would not let go of him a few weeks earlier knowing by keeping Selmak alive he would help in the fight against the replicators but would ultimately die with Selmak due to release of a poison when a Symbiote dies. Selmak fell into a coma shortly after the Dakara Superweapon was activated thus preventing him from saving Jacob.

=== Martouf ===
Martouf, played by JR Bourne (seasons 2–4, 9) – A leader in the ranks of the Tok'ra. Martouf had been the mate of Rosha, host to Jolinar, for almost a century. SG-1 first meet Martouf during their first encounter with the Tok'ra in season 2's "The Tok'ra", and since Jolinar was once blended with Samantha Carter, Martouf develops an interest in her. Some episodes later in "Serpent's Song", Martouf recommends that Apophis, who sought asylum at the SGC, should be handed over to Sokar. In the season 3 two-parter "Jolinar's Memories"/"The Devil You Know", Martouf joins SG-1 on a mission to rescue Jacob Carter, the host of the Tok'ra Selmak, from Ne'tu. They are captured and tortured, but Martouf, Selmak and SG-1 can escape when a new Tok'ra weapon destroys Ne'tu. However, Martouf is unwittingly subjected to Goa'uld mind control, turning him into a zatarc. His attempt to assassinate the President of the United States in season 4's "Divide and Conquer" ends in failure, and Carter is forced to kill him. Martouf's symbiote, Lantash, survives and is placed in a Tok'ra stasis chamber, which is destroyed in a Goa'uld attack in season 5's "Last Stand". The new SGC recruit Lieutenant Elliot (played by Courtenay J. Stevens, season 5) blends with Lantash after a severe injury, but they give their lives to save the rest of SG-1 and the Tok'ra, eliminating the entire Goa'uld invasion force with a vial of symbiote poison. An alternate version of Martouf arrives at the SGC when many SG-1s from alternate realities start coming through the Stargate in season 9's "Ripple Effect". That universe's Martouf had joined the SGC to be closer to Carter, but their relationship did not last.

According to portraying actor Courtenay J. Stevens, the first draft for the character was that he was supposed to be a young Jack O'Neill in the then new spin-off show Stargate Atlantis. The producers dropped Elliot and minimized his role so that he was never even mentioned in Stargate Atlantis. Many fans of Stargate thought that Elliot and his team would replace Samantha Carter, Teal'c, Daniel Jackson and O'Neill as the main characters of the show. Stevens has stated that the producers took much time to look at new "Options", for the series and further stated that he knew "they were looking at it". But the plans were changed and actor Stevens left the Stargate set in Vancouver after the shooting of "Last Stand". When shooting the episode, "Summit" J.R. Bourne was booked, so he was replaced with Stevens. Before being cast in the episode "Summit", the producers told the history behind the Tok'ra symbiote Lantash. Stevens was later cast as Keras in the Stargate Atlantis episode "Childhood's End".

=== Minor characters ===
- Aldwin, played by William deVry (seasons 3–5) – A Tok'ra introduced in season 3's "The Devil You Know" to aid SG-1 on a mission to rescue Jacob Carter from Sokar's prison moon Ne'tu. In season 4's "Absolute Power", Aldwin is sent to the SGC to verify via a zatarc-detecting device that Shifu is indeed the supposed Harcesis. Alwin is killed in season 5's "Summit"/"Last Stand" when Zipacna attacks the planet Revanna where Aldwin guided SG-17 through the Tok'ra base.
- Anise, played by Vanessa Angel (season 4) – A gifted scientist and historian whose human host Freya is attracted to Jack O'Neill, although the symbiote prefers Daniel Jackson, as stated in season 4's "Divide and Conquer". She is introduced in season 4's "Upgrades", researching the Atanik armbands on SG-1 in the hope to use the armbands' powers on a dangerous SG-1 mission to destroy Apophis' new prototype mothership. Anise is present for Tanith's introduction in "Crossroads", and assists Stargate Command in "Divide and Conquer" to uncover possible Zatarcs within the SGC ranks. She improperly diagnoses O'Neill and Carter, who unwittingly lied during the test to conceal their feelings for each other.
- Jolinar of Malkshur, played by Amanda Tapping (season 2) and Tanya Reid (season 3 as Rosha) – Tok'ra symbiote of Rosha and temporarily Samantha Carter. The symbiote is severely injured by an ash'rak, a Goa'uld assassin, and died saving her host's life.
- Ren'al, played by Jennifer Calvert – A member of the Tok'ra High Council. In "Enemies", she travels to Earth to inform General Hammond that, though their plan to destroy Apophis' fleet was successful, no trace of SG-1 or Jacob/Selmak has been found. In "Summit", Ren'al briefs the SGC on an upcoming summit of the Goa'uld System Lords and the Tok'ra plan to assassinate them using symbiote poison. When the Tok'ra base on Ravenna comes under attack by Anubis' minion Zipacna in "Last Stand", Re'nal is killed by falling debris.

== Tollan ==
The Tollan are an advanced human civilization who are introduced in season 1's "Enigma" when the SGC helps a group of them relocate from the original Tollan homeworld that had undergone catastrophic volcanic activity. The Nox take the Tollan in while they continue to search for a new home, later revealed to be named Tollana. The Tollan have a strict policy against sharing technology with more "primitive" races, instituted after such a transfer caused the civilization of their neighboring planet Serita to destroy itself in a single day. Teal'c notes in season 3's "Pretense" that despite the Tollans' technological superiority, they "do not think strategically". The Tollan are wiped out by the forces of the Goa'uld Tanith in season 5's "Between Two Fires" after the Goa'uld Anubis developed shields impervious to Tollan weaponry.

- Narim, played by Garwin Sanford (seasons 1, 3, 5) – An influential Tollan who befriends SG-1 after they save him and a group of fellow Tollans in "Enigma". He develops an apparent attraction to Carter and reconfirms his feelings for her in "Pretense", although she informs him that she is not looking for a relationship at that time. After the death of the Tollan leader, Omoc, in "Between Two Fires", Narim and SG-1 discover that his government was collaborating with the Goa'uld. Narim takes action to spare Earth from destruction, but the Goa'uld begin attacking the planet. Narim escorts SG-1 to the Stargate and stays behind to help his people fight. Shortly afterwards, Narim informs Earth of Tollana's devastations via a transmission, which ends abruptly.
- Travell, played by Marie Stillin (seasons 3, 5) – High Chancellor and a member of the Curia, the Tollan's highest ruling body. She is first seen in "Pretense", where she presides over the hearings about the future of the Goa'uld Klorel and his unwilling host Skaara. In season 3's "Shades of Grey", Travell participates in an undercover operation conducted by the SGC to expose the rogue NID agents as thieves. In Travell's final appearance in "Between Two Fires", she offers Tollan ion cannon technology to Stargate Command, later discovered to be part of Tanith's extortion of the Curia.

== Other alien recurring characters ==
- Cassandra, played by Katie Stuart (seasons 1–2), Pamela Perry (season 2, old woman), and Colleen Rennison (who also played Ally in the S02E10"Bane") (season 5) – A young girl whom SG-1 discovers in season 1's "Singularity" as the sole survivor of a biological plague on the planet Hanka, and whom Janet Fraiser subsequently adopts. A naqahdah bomb that the Goa'uld Nirrti once planted in Cassandra's chest shuts down on its own and is eventually absorbed into her body's tissues, allowing Cassandra to sense the people who are infested, or blended with, a Goa'uld. As such, Cassandra senses Carter to have been taken over by Jolinar in season 2's "In the Line of Duty". In season 5's "Rite of Passage", a retrovirus Cassandra contracted on her home planet several years ago causes her to evolve into a hok'taur (an advanced human being), but SG-1 makes a deal with Nirrti to save Cassandra's life. After Janet Fraiser's death in season 7's "Heroes", Carter promises to inform Cassandra about what happened to her adopted mother. Travelling from the year 1969 to several decades into the future, SG-1 meets Cassandra as an old woman in season 2's "1969", who helps them return to their own time. In season 9, Carter mentions that Cassandra is going through a hard time.
- Chaka, played by Dion Johnstone (seasons 4–5) and by Patrick Currie (season 7) – A young Unas from P3X-888 who captures Daniel in season 4's "The First Ones" to prove his maturity to his tribe. When the two learn to communicate, Chaka kills his tribe's existing Alpha male and rises to become the new leader. After SG-1 frees Chaka from slave dealers in season 5's "Beast of Burden", Chaka chooses to remain behind to lead an ultimately fragile but successful fight for the freedom of his fellow Unas. Chaka last appears in season 7's "Enemy Mine" to negotiate between a large group of aborigine Unas and SGC personnel, whose naqahdah mining operations on the Unas planet unwittingly encroached on holy Unas ground. • When Dion Johnstone was unavailable to play Chaka in "Enemy Mine", Patrick Currie (who had previously been cast to play Fifth) prepared for the role by watching Johnstones's previous performances. Director Peter DeLuise told Currie to follow Dion's lead but to add his own spin to the character. Playing an Unas is a challenging job as it requires a full prosthetic body-suit, contact lenses, and fake teeth.
- Dreylock, played by Gillian Barber (seasons 6–7) – A high ranking Kelownan official from Jonas Quinn's home planet Langara, and a Kelownan ambassador to other nations and planets. She approaches Earth in season 6's "Shadow Play" to obtain more advanced military technology against Kelowna's two rival nations, but the SGC refuse to share their technology. Dreylock becomes Kelowna's new First Minister in season 7's "Homecoming" and ask Earth for help against Anubis. Dreylock subsequently allows Jonas Quinn, whom she previously regarded as a traitor, to remain on Langara. Since the forming of the planet's Joint Ruling Council in the aftermath of the Goa'uld invasion, Dreylock has become concerned with maintaining the uneasy peace between the three nations and again asks for Earth's help in season 7's "Fallout".
- Martin Lloyd, played by Willie Garson (seasons 4–5, 10) – A human from another planet who crashed on Earth after deserting from his military fighting a losing war with the Goa'uld. Drugged with pharmaceuticals by his comrades, Martin loses his memories and becomes a paranoid conspiracy theorist who learns of the Stargate Program. In season 4's "Point of No Return", O'Neill helps Martin to slowly regain his memory, and Martin chooses to remain on Earth. By season 5's "Wormhole X-Treme!", Martin has become so disgruntled with his life that he starts taking the drugs again. His latent memories inspire him to create a campy science fiction television show, Wormhole X-Treme!, based on the real Stargate program and SG-1, and O'Neill helps Martin recover his memories once again. A ship approaches Earth to pick up Martin's former comrades, but Martin chooses to stay behind to continue working on Wormhole X-Treme! as a creative consultant. As becomes known in season 10's "200", Martin's show only aired for three episodes but had high DVD sales. Martin approaches the SGC to review a script for a television movie based on the series, and although the movie is eventually cancelled, the series is renewed, ultimately lasting ten years with Martin Lloyd as producer.
- Lya, played by Frida Betrani (seasons 1, 3) – A Nox woman. She first appears in season 1's "The Nox", where her family brings her back from the dead after one of Apophis' Jaffa killed her. In season 1's "Enigma", Lya offers the Tollan sanctuary with the Nox. In season 3's "Pretense", Lya serves as the neutral attorney at a Tollan hearing and eventually gives the deciding vote to remove the Goa'uld Klorel from his host Skaara. Lya also enables the Tollan to repel a Goa'uld attack.
- Shifu, played by Lane Gates (season 4) – The son of Sha're and of the host of the Goa'uld Apophis, conceived while Sha're was the host to the Goa'uld Amonet. Apophis intended him as his new host. As the offspring of two human hosts, Shifu possesses the Goa'uld genetic memory and is referred to as "Harcesis". After his birth in season 2's "Secrets", the boy is hidden safely on Abydos until Amonet discovers him in season 3's "Forever in a Day". She sends him to Kheb to keep him safe from the Goa'uld who want the child killed. In season 3's "Maternal Instinct", SG-1 finds and leaves him there in the care of a powerful energy being called Oma Desala. In season 4's "Absolute Power", SG-1 encounters Shifu on Abydos and invites him to Earth. After SG-1 acknowledges that Shifu would never reveal his genetic knowledge, Shifu ascends. In season 4's "Absolute Power" Dr. Daniel Jackson translates Shifu into English as "light"; however, in Chinese the word shifu also means "teacher". In the same episode, Shifu says that all he is doing is teaching Daniel.
- Kull Warriors (also known as Supersoldiers), played by Dan Payne and Alex Zahara (seasons 7–8) – Creatures created by Anubis for use as his personal army against minor Goa'uld. The Kull Warriors first appear in the two-part episode "Evolution", where seemingly none of the weapons of SG-1 or the Jaffa are effective against them. In "Death Knell", Samantha Carter and Selmak develop a prototype weapon designed to counteract the energy animating the Kull Warriors. After the apparent defeat of Anubis in "Lost City", Ba'al gains control of the Supersoldiers and thus a significant advantage over his rivals. As a result, in the episode "New Order" the other System Lords approach Earth for a new military arrangement. A simulated invasion of Stargate Command by Kull Warriors is the main premise of the episode "Avatar". In "Threads", the remaining Kull Warriors become aimless and confused after Anubis' final defeat, and are easily dispatched. The Kull Warriors make one appearance in the Stargate Atlantis episode "Phantoms", where they are hallucinations caused by a Wraith device. The Kull Warriors were conceived as a much more powerful adversary than the Jaffa, and one that would be more palatable to fight. The art department developed the final concept while "Evolution" was written; in the original plans, the face looked a lot like that of the Borg, which eventually developed into the idea of the fiber-optic network that ran over the skull. The motion of the Kull Warrior was deliberately styled to be unique and not resemble other robotic characters, such as RoboCop, the Borg, or human-form Replicators. Dan Payne described the suit as the most functional, mobile full-body unit he has ever been in. It took 15 to 30 minutes to get him into the suit, making him about seven feet tall due to the helmet and the boots.

== See also ==
- List of Stargate Atlantis characters
- List of Stargate Universe characters
