= Threads (Stargate SG-1) =

- Stargate SG-1 episode
- Episode no.: Season 8 Episode 18
- Directed by: Andy Mikita
- Written by: Robert C. Cooper
- Production code: 818
- Original air date: February 8, 2005

Guest appearances
- Carmen Argenziano as Jacob Carter; Tony Amendola as Bra'tac; David DeLuise as Pete Shanahan; Clare Carey as Kerry Johnson; Gary Jones as Walter Harriman; Cliff Simon as Ba'al; Isaac Hayes as Tolok; Mel Harris as Oma Desala; George Dzundza as Jim; Rik Kiviaho as Anubis

Episode chronology
← Previous "Reckoning"	Next → "Moebius"
- Stargate SG-1 (season 8)

"Threads" is an episode from Season 8 of the science fiction television series Stargate SG-1. Amanda Tapping won a Leo Award in the category "Dramatic Series: Best Lead Performance - Female" and Michael Shanks was nominated, for a Leo Award in the category "Dramatic Series: Best Lead Performance - Male" for this episode.

== Plot ==
Ba'al is still missing, but the Jaffa have finally won their freedom from the Goa'uld. Teal'c and Bra'tac are awarded the title Bloodkin by the new Free Jaffa Nation, following the defeat of the Replicators and the Goa'uld. Jack O'Neill refuses to accept that Daniel Jackson is dead, believing that Daniel has managed to Ascend.

Jacob Carter reveals to Sam that he is dying and urges her to find happiness without letting rules stand in her way, implying that she should be in a relationship with Jack. After her father's death, Sam ends her engagement to Pete.

Daniel finds himself in a strange ethereal diner where he recognizes Oma Desala. He learns that this place is a projection of a meeting place for Ascended beings. The diner is full of other Ascended Ancients who refuse to speak with Daniel because of the rules of the Ascended. One other man, Jim, seems to be arguing with Oma and shows Daniel a newspaper detailing Anubis' plan to retake Dakara and use the Dakara Superweapon to kill all life in the galaxy. Luring most of the Jaffa away, Anubis regains the weapon when he recaptures Dakara.

Back in the Ascended Diner, Oma explains she has been punished for helping people like Daniel to ascend. Daniel then realizes that Anubis is half-ascended and that Oma had helped him ascend. The other Ancients refused to demote Anubis as a part of Oma's punishment for breaking the rules, despite the fact that Anubis is still a threat to the galaxy. Daniel then realizes Jim is Anubis - Anubis' chosen manifested form in his half-protrusion into the Ascended realm.

Back on Earth, the gate dials when Anubis activates the weapon on every gate in the galaxy. However, back in the Ascended realm, Daniel has persuaded Oma to take responsibility for Anubis. She stands up to fight Anubis, and all of the other ancients turn in surprise. Anubis laughs, saying that she cannot possibly defeat him, as he is kept alive as punishment, and Oma takes Anubis into the Ascended realm to fight him there and prevent him from acting in the galaxy. Daniel is returned to the SGC from the Ascended Realm. SG-1 celebrates with a fishing trip to Jack's cottage.

== Production ==
The episode originally aired as a 63-minute piece, but an edited 45-minute version exists for syndication. When the season was initially released on DVD, the release contained the shortened 45-minute version. Due to complaints, MGM offered a rebate whereby people could send in proof of purchase from the DVD with the shortened episode to receive a DVD with the original episode. When the season was re-released in slimline cases, it contained the full 63-minute episode as did the standard Region 2 version of the Season 8 boxset. Neither version has a commentary featured on any of the Season 8 Box sets. The 45-minute version omits the following:

- The "Previously on Stargate SG-1..." that is present in the 63-minute version.
- The opening scene between Ba'al and the decaying Anubis where he says Ba'al has betrayed him.
- The scene when Daniel first enters the diner, along with Oma explaining where exactly Daniel was and how he got there.
- The entire scene of knighting Bra'tac and Teal'c on Dakara - nothing is mentioned of Jaffa's freedom save they have control of the weapon.
- Some bantering between Pete and Sam when they walk down the corridors of the SGC and the bantering among Sam, Pete and Jacob.
- All scenes of Bra'tac and Teal'c on a ship.
- Jack waking up with Kerry in his bed.
- Daniel trying to talk to the other Ancients in the diner.
- The phone call from Pete, the florist scene, and driving to the new house.
- Sam waiting in the car outside Jack's house.
- Daniel saying "No syrup?"

Also, the diner is the Der Waffelhouse set from the Showtime series Dead Like Me (both shows are produced by MGM Television in Vancouver). The diner is the set of the main meeting place in most, if not all, episodes of Dead Like Me.

== Reception ==
Amanda Tapping won a Leo Award in the category "Dramatic Series: Best Lead Performance - Female" and Michael Shanks was nominated for a Leo Award in the category "Dramatic Series: Best Lead Performance - Male" for this episode.
