= Daniel Jackson (Stargate) =

Fictional character from the Stargate universe

- Michael Shanks as Daniel Jackson
- First appearance: Stargate
- Last appearance: "Incursion" (Universe)
- Portrayed by: James Spader (1994); Michael Shanks (1997–2010)

In-universe information
- Species: Human
- Occupation: Archaeologist; Linguist
- Family: Melburn Jackson (father), Claire Jackson (mother), Nick Ballard (grandfather), Sha're (deceased wife), Shifu (step-son), Skaara (brother-in-law), Kasuf (father-in-law)
- Nationality: American

Daniel Jackson, PhD, is a fictional character in the military science fiction franchise Stargate. He is portrayed by James Spader in the 1994 film of the same name and by Michael Shanks in the 1997 TV series Stargate SG-1 and other derived media. Jackson is the only Stargate character to appear in all films and series in the franchise.

In the 1994 film, Dr. Jackson is an archaeologist who is a part of the first team to go through the Stargate on a reconnaissance mission, led by Colonel Jack O'Neil. He becomes one of the main characters of the subsequent television series Stargate SG-1 where he, Jack O'Neill, Samantha Carter and Teal'c make a team that is part of Stargate Program, whose goal is to explore the galaxy and defend against alien threats. Jackson is part of SG-1 until his death at the end of the season 5, when he is replaced by Jonas Quinn.

Upon his death, Dr. Jackson ascends to a higher plane of existence among the Ancients. He makes occasional appearances in season 6 before retaking human form and rejoining SG-1 in the seventh season. Jackson appears in the series until the finale at the end of the tenth season and appears in both direct-to-DVD films that act as sequels to the series.

Dr. Jackson also appears in three episodes of Stargate Atlantis and four episodes of Stargate Universe. For his portrayal of Jackson, Shanks was nominated for three Saturn Awards for Best Actor on Television and for five Leo Awards, winning two: Best Lead Performance by a Male in a Dramatic Series for Stargate SG-1 in 2004, and Best Lead Performance by a Male in a Feature Length Drama for Stargate: Continuum in 2009.

== Character arc ==
Born on July 8, 1965, Daniel Jackson is the only living child of Melburn and Claire Jackson, archaeologists who were crushed to death while supervising the placement of a piece of Egyptian art in the Metropolitan Museum of Art. Daniel's maternal grandfather and only living relative, Nicholas Ballard (played by Jan Rubeš), was a noted Dutch archaeologist and too busy to take the orphaned Jackson under his wing. Though placed in foster care, Daniel visited his grandfather in a mental institution until they had an argument over his failing career and Daniel left. Jackson became an archaeologist and linguist who speaks 23 earthly (plus several extraterrestrial) languages—he is shown speaking at least English, Russian, German, Spanish, Mandarin Chinese, Egyptian, Goa'uld, Ancient, and Unas.

James Spader as Daniel Jackson in Stargate.

In the 1994 film Stargate, the character of Jackson is introduced in a scene in which he is presenting a lecture at an academic seminar. However, he finds little acceptance there of his theory that the Pyramids of Giza are much older than they are thought to be. An aged woman named Catherine Langford approaches him to offer him a job deciphering the cover-stones of a device found in Egypt. Jackson uses his knowledge of ancient Egyptian languages to make the so-called Stargate function.

Jackson then travels with a team led by Col. Jack O'Neill through the Stargate, and they discover that it leads to the planet Abydos. Daniel meets, falls in love with, and marries a native woman, Sha'uri — named Sha're in the TV series Stargate SG-1. After winning the battle to free the Abydonians from the System Lord Ra, Daniel decides not to return to Earth with the rest of the team and to instead live the rest of his life learning about the history of Abydos, with its culture based on that of ancient Egypt. Col. O'Neill lies to his superiors, saying that Daniel Jackson is dead.

In the television series Stargate SG-1, Daniel's life changes when his wife and his brother-in-law are abducted and turned into hosts for the Goa'uld. Daniel joins the SG-1 team in hopes of rescuing them. Daniel is briefly reunited with Sha're, who had been made host to Apophis' queen Amonet, in season 2's "Secrets", when she temporarily controls her body while pregnant with the Harcesis child Shifu. Shortly after Teal'c kills Sha're in season 3's "Forever in a Day", Sha're gives Daniel information to find her child, reconfirms her love for him and asks him to forgive Teal'c. Daniel remains a part of the team and later saves his brother-in-law Skaara from the Goa'uld Klorel in season 3's "Pretense". In season 3's "Maternal Instinct", Daniel discovers the Harcesis child on another planet and leaves him under the care of Oma Desala, a being of great power and wisdom. SG-1 meets Shifu again as a much older boy in season 4's "Absolute Power".

In the penultimate season 5 episode "Meridian", Daniel is exposed to a lethal dose of radiation while attempting to fix a naquadria reactor on the planet Langara in the nation-state known as Kelowna. The Ancient Oma Desala guides Daniel to ascend to a higher plane of existence. The Kelownan scientist Jonas Quinn takes Daniel's place on SG-1 during season 6, although the rest of the team find it hard to get over Daniel's absence. Ascended Daniel visits O'Neill and Teal'c during times of crisis, but the laws of ascended beings forbid him to interfere directly, with his visits simply consisting of providing moral support to his old teammates as they face torturous experiences on their own. In the season 6 finale "Full Circle", ascended Daniel seeks to aid SG-1 in defeating the plans of Anubis. Before Daniel can destroy Anubis, he is whisked away, but Oma helps Daniel by ascending the entire population of Abydos before Anubis destroys the planet.

Daniel is discovered naked and without memory on the planet Vis Uban in the season 7 opener "Fallen". Daniel rejoins SG-1 full-time one episode later, and Jonas returns to his people. Daniel spends much of season 7 trying to tap into his Ascended memories of his time of Ascension and to find the Lost City of the Ancients. This leads to the discovery of the Ancient Outpost at Antarctica in the season 7 finale "Lost City", contributing to the spin-off Stargate Atlantis. In season 8's "Prometheus Unbound", Daniel meets Vala Mal Doran, who seizes the Prometheus with him on board. Although Daniel evades her sexual advances and thwarts her plans, she escapes. After Daniel's death at the hands of RepliCarter in "Reckoning (Part 2)", Oma Desala provides a path for Daniel to ascend in "Threads", but Daniel is descended back to Earth naked to live on as a human, this time with full memory of what just happened to him.

In the season 9 opener "Avalon", Vala seeks out Daniel at Stargate Command (SGC) and prevents him from going to Atlantis. The discovery of an Ancient communication device transports their minds to a village in a distant galaxy where they make contact with the Ori. Vala and Daniel can return to Earth safely, but unintentionally bring the Ori threat to the Milky Way. After Vala is accidentally transported to the Ori galaxy in "Beachhead", Daniel reunites with Vala aboard one of the invading Ori ships in the season 10 opener "Flesh and Blood." After their escape, Daniel speaks up in support of Vala's request to join the SGC. With the ancient Merlin's knowledge, Daniel builds the Sangraal in "The Quest". Vala's rapidly matured daughter Adria captures Daniel and turns him into an Ori Prior in "The Shroud" to convert the Tau'ri to the path of Origin, but Daniel returns to his normal self at the end of the episode. In "Unending", the last episode of the series, SG-1 gets stuck in a time dilation field aboard the Earth ship Odyssey, and a romance between Vala and Daniel comes to fruition. Before the time dilation field is reversed after fifty years, erasing all linked memories in the process, Daniel and Vala express their feelings for each other.

Jackson makes a cameo appearance in the pilot of Stargate Atlantis, "Rising", where he assists Rodney McKay and Elizabeth Weir on the Antarctic Outpost, unearthed in SG-1's season 7 finale, "Lost City". Here, he helps them to persuade Jack O'Neill to green-light the Atlantis expedition. Furthermore, he makes an appearance in the season 5 episodes "First Contact" and "The Lost Tribe" where he visits Atlantis to study the ancient scientist Janus. Whilst there he and McKay are captured by a rogue branch of Asgard, who wish to use them to activate the "Attero Device" to neutralize the Wraith threat in the galaxy but with the unforeseen consequence of destroying the Stargates which would explode, killing tens of thousands of innocent people.

In the time following the conclusion of Stargate Atlantis, Jackson still works for Stargate Command, along with Dr. Nicholas Rush. Jackson is attempting to unlock the 9th Chevron address, which would be later opened by Eli Wallace at the Icarus Base. Jackson assists Dr. Rush's research team by recording a series of instructional videos explaining the stargate, the history of the ancients, the stargate addressing system and hyperdrive technology. Wallace watched several of Jackson's videos on the way to Icarus base, growing increasingly annoyed at the "in-flight safety tip" type recordings Jackson made.

=== Relationships ===
Jackson marries Sha're due to a misunderstanding on the first mission to Abydos and remains with her for a year on Abydos until she is taken as a host for Amonet ("Children of the Gods"). He remains committed to her until her death in "Forever in a Day". Prior to this, Daniel's moments of (involuntary) infidelity include claiming a young woman in "The Broca Divide" while regressed to a primitive stage of Homo sapiens, is sexually assaulted by Hathor in "Hathor", and is drugged and held prisoner to be the consort of a young woman named Shyla, the daughter of the planet's ruler, in "Need". After Sha're's death, Daniel occasionally pursues other relationships: he is briefly drawn to Ke'ra (who turns out to be Linea, the Destroyer of Worlds) in "Past and Present" and encounters his old girlfriend, Sarah Gardner, between seasons 4 and 7, but he is prevented from taking anything further when Sarah is taken as a host by the long-trapped Goa'uld Osiris until she is finally released. He also meets Leda in "Icon" who develops feelings for him, although circumstances prevent anything coming of it. Daniel develops a love-hate relationship with Vala Mal Doran between seasons 8 and 10; it is established multiple times that their feelings for each other are far deeper than either of them care to admit. Vala's daughter, the Orici Adria, develops an attraction to Daniel while attempting to convert him to the path of Origin during season 10.

On a personal level, Jackson is very close to his teammates on the original SG-1, with each of them constantly depicted as willing to go to great lengths to protect each other, even with such moments as Teal'c's role in Sha're being taken by Apophis or Jack distancing himself from the others to go undercover and expose the NID's theft of alien artifacts.

Jackson has an antagonistic relationship with Dr. Rodney McKay, as evidenced in season 5 of Stargate: Atlantis. He feels McKay is an arrogant, overbearing, insufferable ass, and can barely hide his dislike for his Atlantis counterpart. McKay's feeling is mutual, and they engaged in a verbal sparring match throughout their time together, but they at least have a mutual respect for each other's accomplishments.

=== Profession ===
In the movie Stargate, Daniel Jackson, PhD, is presented as having several professional credentials including archaeologist, historian, and linguist. Jackson utilizes his skills in all three fields throughout the film as it becomes evident that he specializes in Egyptology.

Jackson, as an archaeologist, becomes the stereotypical academic – extremely smart, nerdy, socially awkward, and quirky. As a character, which further exemplifies this stereotype, Daniel represents an antithesis to the military stereotype of shoot first, ask questions later. Jackson is frequently depicted as approaching other cultures; past, present, and future, in a culturally sensitive manner, sometimes siding with their interests above those of the military back on Earth. Daniel seems more akin to a pseudo-archaeologist than a scientist. Pseudo-archaeology operates, generally, outside of the empirical and analytical methods of the profession of archaeology, and often is associated with claims of extraterrestrial life, magic, and other phenomena. In the fictional universe of Stargate, Daniel is proven correct about his claims that the Egyptian pyramids are much older than anyone believes and even finds out they are of extraterrestrial design. As Lynn Meskell observed of the film Stargate: “Egypt represents everything Other, everything we cannot fathom or explain, all things ritualized, sacrificed and sexual’ and summed up in the film as the queered, extraterrestrial Ra, like Egypt identified as inexplicable, unnatural and evil...”(1998a:73).

=== "Deaths" ===
The show's staff and writers occasionally make jokes about Daniel's frequent "deaths" on the show. In the season 7 episode "Heroes", one of the SG teams examine some ancient ruins and a scientist says "Dr. Jackson is gonna die when he sees this!" to which another member (Col. David Dixon, played by Adam Baldwin) responds "What, again?". Comparisons have also been made between Daniel and Kenny from the cartoon series South Park. Daniel's first death is by staff blast while he defends O'Neil; he is resurrected by Ra with a sarcophagus in the film. Daniel flatlines in Season 4's "The Light". He dies of radiation poisoning in season 5's "Meridian" and Ascends to a higher plane until he reappears in Season 7's "Fallen (part 1)". He is killed by RepliCarter at the very end of "Reckoning" and is seen at a midway point between Ascension and mortality before finally retaking human form in "Threads". Daniel is presumed dead after SG-1 is brainwashed to believe this in Season 1's "Fire and Water". Daniel also is killed by Teal'c several times in a virtual reality system in Season 8's "Avatar". Other deaths generally involve Daniel's teammates: they die together in "The Nox" (where they get resurrected by the Nox) and in the alternate future of "2010"; their robot versions are killed in "Double Jeopardy", Daniel being the first to die; and a Goa'uld-possessed alternate timeline version of Daniel is shot by Teal'c in "Moebius", while in another timeline in the same episode, all of SG-1 are killed except Daniel. In the series first instance of an alternate timeline, the Daniel from that timeline is also presumed dead as his last known location is Egypt which is shown to have been attacked by the Goa'uld. Daniel is also killed in a Goa'uld invasion in the Stargate Command, replaced by an alternate Daniel in "Stargate SG-1: The Gift of the Gods" from a doppelganger reality. In Stargate: Continuum Daniel is feared dead when he asks Carter and Mitchell to leave him behind while they search for help in the Arctic, only to be rescued by Col. O'Neill. Jackson is again killed by a Jaffa staff weapon near the end before Mitchell uses Ba'al's time-travel device to prevent Ba'al invading and conquering Earth.

== Conceptual history ==
James Spader was intrigued by the script because he found it "awful". Mostly because of his manual-labourist view of acting, he accepted the role as a regular job that earned him some money. Michael Shanks was chosen because he did "the perfect imitation of James Spader", according to Brad Wright. Showtime's announcement to not renew Stargate SG-1 after season 5 coincided with Shanks' decision to leave the show for concerns of being underutilized. Panicking fans started intensive write-in fan campaigns to save the show and the character, partly conflating the two issues, but Sci-Fi Channel decided to continue the show and fill the void with a new character. Casting agents met Corin Nemec at the courtyard of MGM's Santa Monica offices by chance and offered him the role of Jonas Quinn, beginning with the penultimate season 5 episode "Meridian".

== Reception ==
For his portrayal of Daniel Jackson, Michael Shanks was nominated for a Leo Award in 2000 for "Best Performance by a Male in a Dramatic Series" in 2000 for the episode "Forever in a Day". After a 2004 Leo win in the category "Dramatic Series: Best Lead Performance by a Male" for "Lifeboat", Shanks was nominated for a 2005 Leo Award in the same category for the episode "Threads". Shanks was nominated for a Saturn Award in the category "Best Supporting Actor on Television" in 2001, 2004 and 2005.
