= Lifeboat (Stargate SG-1) =

- Stargate SG-1 episode
- Episode no.: Season 7 Episode 6
- Directed by: Peter DeLuise
- Written by: Brad Wright
- Cinematography by: Peter F. Woeste
- Editing by: Brad Rines
- Production code: P275
- Original air date: July 18, 2003

Guest appearances
- Teryl Rothery as Dr. Janet Fraiser; James Parks as Pharrin; Travis Webster as Tryan; Ryan Drescher as Young Keenin; Gary Jones as Walter Harriman; Kimberly Unger as Infirmary Nurse; Rob Hayter as Orderly; Colin Corrigan as Med Team Leader

Episode chronology
← Previous "Revisions"	Next → "Enemy Mine"
- Stargate SG-1 (season 7)

"Lifeboat" is the 6th episode from the seventh season of military science fiction adventure television show Stargate SG-1 and is the 138th overall. It was first broadcast on July 18, 2003, on the Sci-Fi Channel. The episode was written by the shows co-creator Brad Wright, and was directed by Peter DeLuise.

In the episode, SG-1 discover a crashed alien spaceship carrying hundreds of people who have are frozen in stasis pods. Whilst exploring, the team are knocked unconscious and upon awakening discover that several of the ships passengers have somehow been downloaded into Daniel Jackson's (Michael Shanks) body.

Due to his father dying, Richard Dean Anderson was not present during the original filming of the episode, with all of his scenes being filmed separately after filming the episode had otherwise been completed. Michael Shanks, who portrays Dr. Daniel Jackson, won a Leo Award in the category "Dramatic Series: Best Lead Performance - Male" for his performance in the episode, whilst Teryl Rothery was nominated for a Leo Award in the category "Dramatic Series: Best Supporting Performance - Female" for her performance as Dr. Janet Fraiser in the episode.

== Plot ==
While exploring an alien planet, SG-1 finds a crashed alien space ship and onboard they discover hundreds of people frozen in stasis pods. Colonel Jack O'Neill (Richard Dean Anderson) orders a headcount and the team split up. Soon Dr. Daniel Jackson (Michael Shanks) discovers a pod that has failed, when suddenly a bright burst of energy courses throughout the ship knocking SG-1 unconscious. Teal'c (Christopher Judge) recovers first and then soon locates O'Neill and Samantha Carter (Amanda Tapping) who are both fine. However they soon locate Jackson, who becomes hysterical upon seeing his teammates. The team bring Jackson back to Stargate Command, where he becomes enraged and claims that he is the Sovereign of Talthus, and that his name is in fact Martice. Dr. Janet Fraiser (Teryl Rothery) conducts an EEG of Jackson which suggests he is in a coma, and his body is now host to a number of personalities.

Through the different personalities, Dr. Fraiser learns that the people they found are passengers of the ship Stromos which was bound for the world Ardena. One of the personalities, a young and fearful boy named Keenin, explains that they boarded the ship to escape the destruction of their homeworld. Another personality, Tryan, one of the ship's engineers, tells them that the passengers are stored in a cyrosleep and that each person's consciousness has been uploaded to a memory module to avoid deteriorating during the long voyage. He also informs Dr. Fraiser that there is no way to separate the cryosleeper from their consciousness or send it to any other than their corresponding body — unless that person dies. Believing that someone may have awoken from cyrosleep and caused this, Carter and Teal'c head back to the Stromos to search for the guilty party.

On board the Stromos, Teal'c captures Pharrin (James Parks), who tells Teal'c and Carter that he was awoken from cyrosleep after the ship crashed. With the ship, its cyrosleep pods and memory module all losing power, Pharrin decided to bypass its safety failsafes, and confesses to using Daniel as a lifeboat to host some of the souls once stored in the ship's memory. He also reveals that he too is hosting a number of other passengers in order to keep them alive. Carter offers Pharrin help in powering their ship and saving their race in exchange for restoring Daniel, but Pharrin informs them that his own son, Keenin, is now being kept alive in Daniel Jackson.

Back at Stargate Command, Pharrin agrees to make the ultimate sacrifice in order to save his people, restoring Daniel Jackson and permanently removing the other souls from inside of him. However, the Sovereign Martice comes to the forefront of Daniel's body and orders Pharrin not to make any sacrifice. The personalities controlling Daniel shift again, and Keenin emerges and shares a final goodbye with his father. Pharrin transfers the souls in Daniel into his own mind. The ship restored, they can continue their journey to a new world.

== Production ==
=== Development and writing ===
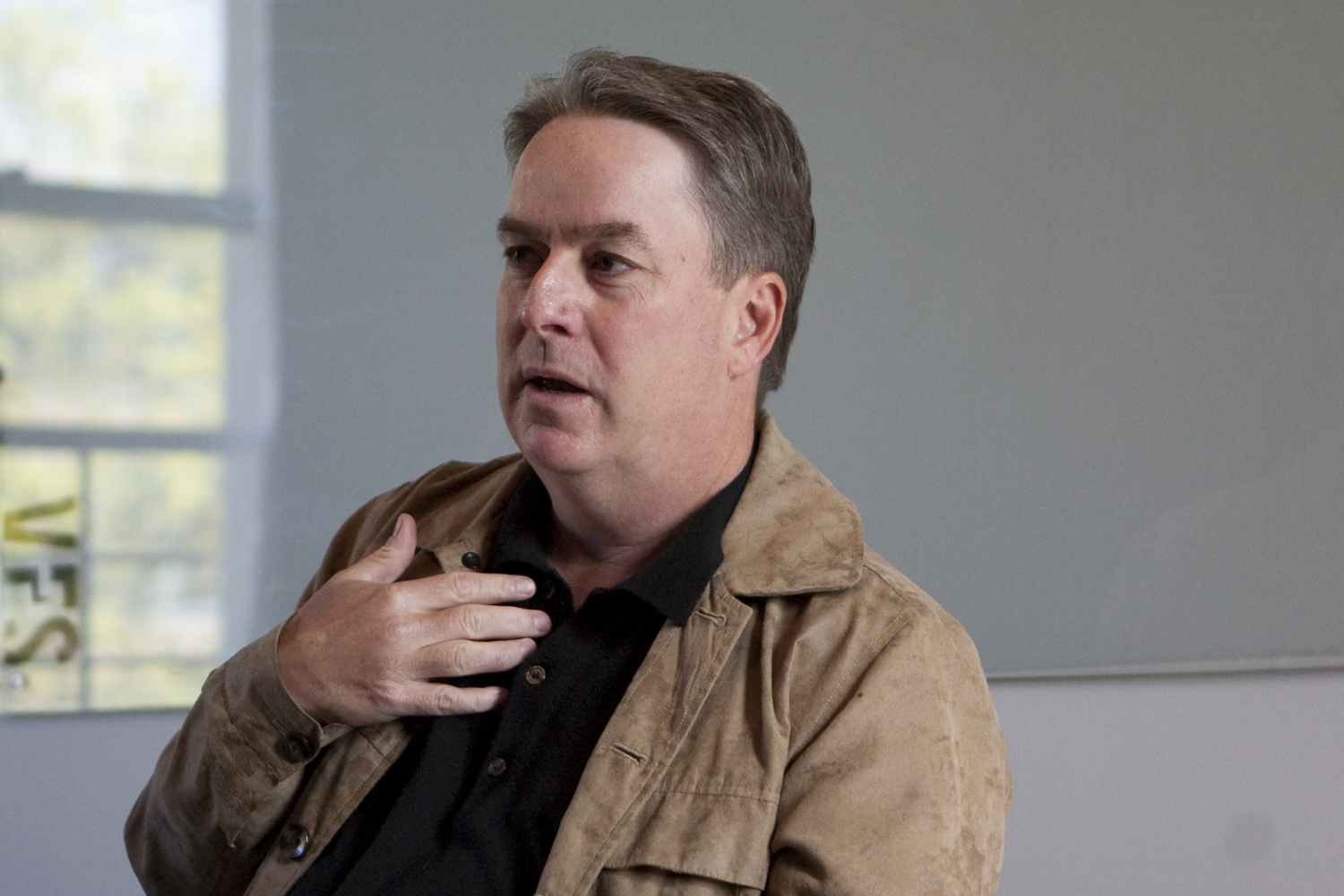
Series co-creator Brad Wright wrote the episode.

Series co-creator and former executive producer Brad Wright made the decision during the shows sixth season that should the show be picked up for a seventh, he would take a "sabbatical" in order to continue developing a potential spinoff series, Stargate Atlantis, making Robert C. Cooper as executive producer. After SG-1 was renewed, Wright sat in on early meetings for the seventh season, but soon left his office at The Bridge Studios, limiting his involvement to just phoning Cooper "almost daily - or at least a few times each week" which Wright described as "almost a courtesy call to let me know what was going on, as much as it was for the occasional piece of advise". Wright did however want to pen "a few episodes", which would ultimately end up being "Lifeboat" and the season finale "Lost City", which he co-wrote with Cooper. Originally referred to as "Voices", Wright had first outlined the idea for the episode in 2002 during the writing of the shows sixth season, however the absence of Michael Shanks, who had left the shows main cast, meant that the episode was shelved. Co-producer and writer Joseph Mallozzi explained "because of the type of story it was, it only worked with the Daniel character, which was why when Daniel came back, Brad dusted off the pitch and wrote the script", with it eventually being retitled to "Lifeboat".

In the episode, twelve different personalities are downloaded into Daniel Jackson's (Michael Shanks) body, three of which are concentrated on: Tryan, who is a loyal engineer on board the Stromos, Martice - the Sovereign leader, and Keenin - who is a young boy. Shanks wanted to make sure all of the different characters he would portray were "clearly defined" as "structurally, they all had to be certain extremities", however the schedule constraints of the show meant Shanks did not have much time in order to flesh the characters out. In order to make the different characters stand out, Shanks used a number of different methods in constructing his performances, looking to "attach a recognisable quirk or trait to each of them" as well as borrowing "from other different shows that I had watched". Shanks initial idea for playing Martice was based around Ralph Fiennes depiction of Amon Göth in the 1993 film Schindler's List, with Shanks giving the character a thick German accent. This was eventually changed more towards what Shanks described as a faux-British accent, inspired somewhat by Patrick Stewart. Tryan, the ships engineer was inspired by Jack Lemmon's character Jack Godell from the 1979 film The China Syndrome. For the character of Keenin, Shanks decided to base his performance on that of actor Ryan Drescher's, who would be portraying the character in flashback sequences. Shanks felt Drescher "had given such an interesting read" and studied his audition tapes, attempting to copy certain mannerisms that he was able to find in his performance and apply them to his own depiction of the character.

Teryl Rothery returns as Dr. Janet Fraiser. James Parks portrays the character of Pharrin and Ryan Drescher plays Keenin, who is Pharrin's son, both who are passengers on board the Stromos. Frequent background actor Dean Redman had originally been cast to portray Tryan, but had to pull out due to another job. According to director of the episode Peter DeLuise, this would have been Redman's first speaking role and that Redman was "mortified" that he could not do it, but DeLuise instead gave him a speaking role in the episode "Enemy Mine". DeLuise instead auditioned background actors on the day, reportedly by going from table to table during a lunch break, asking the extras to recite the line 'Compartment is secure, sir' in a Boston accent and eventually arriving at actor Travis Webster who DeLuise awarded the part to. Gary Jones and Dan Shea reprise their roles as technician and Siler. Kimberly Unger, Rob Hayter, Colin Corrigan and Fraser Aitcheson all portray Stargate Command personnel. Peter DeLuise cameos as a man in a status pod.

=== Design and filming ===
For the interior of the crashed alien spaceship Stromos, production designer Bridget McGuire explained "After doing a very stark Sci-Fi type of set in "Revisions", I wanted to go completely in the other direction and create a space that was more traditional and warm, almost Jules Verne-like". Originally, the Stromos interior was expected to feature far less, with only four pages of the script taking place there and only calling for a set wall that would be covered in suspended animation pods. After rewrites, around twelve pages of the script would take place on board the Stromos set, and therefore far more of the ship would need to be seen. In order to not have to build a far larger set, Rodrigo Segovia designed the pods on wheels, constructing around 20 pods total which could be easily moved into different configurations, to give the impression of different rooms and corridors on board the ship. Parts of the interior were then extended using matte paintings. Once background actors were put inside the pods DeLuise recalled that one extra had a panic attack from the enclosed space, whilst another fell asleep.

Whilst not usually the case, in order to help with Shanks' portrayal of multiple personalities DeLuise tried where possible to shoot the episode in chronological order. Richard Dean Anderson was not available for the majority of the episode due to his father dying. In order to still feature Jack O'Neill, Anderson's stand-in Bill Nykolite was used where possible, whilst DeLuise limited his use of wider group shots. Filming had been otherwise completed by the time Anderson returned to work, with the rest of the cast moving on to other episodes, therefore DeLuise filmed all of Anderson's scenes separately so he could be inserted into the episode. Where possible, DeLuise had cast members return to read with Anderson, however most of Anderson's scenes were filmed either alone or with stand-ins. As so much of the episode would take place in a single observation room on the Stargate Command set at The Bridge Studio and feature just the characters of Daniel Jackson and Janet Fraiser, DeLuise considered it a difficult episode to shoot. In order to "make it interesting for the viewer" DeLuise, who would normally spend much more time blocking but instead allowed Shanks and Rothery to move around the set much more freely, with DeLuise keeping the camera locked on them. DeLuise and Director of Photography Peter Woeste also opted to light just the actors in the observation room scene, giving the impression of a dark, black room. DeLuise had Teryl Rothery play some of her scenes with Michael Shanks in different ways. In one take, Rothery described having "Janet blow her stack, which is quite rare because she is usually very contained and in control", whilst in other takes were not as heated. For some of the shots of characters watching Daniel Jackson and Janet Fraiser from the observation rooms gallery, DeLuise took influence from the film The Rock, panning from a live video feed of Jackson and Fraiser on a monitor, to the characters in the room itself. For some of the most abrupt, rapid personality changes between that Michael Shanks was portraying, DeLuise took inspiration for his filming and editing from the way Gollum/Sméagol was sometimes shown in The Lord of the Rings film series, making quick, close-up cuts between camera angles.

== Release ==
=== Broadcast and ratings ===
The episode was first broadcast on July 18, 2003, on the Sci-Fi Channel in the United States, earning a Nielson rating of 1.7 and remained the networks highest-rated program. The episode was first syndicated on US television on January 3, 2005, where it earned a 2.0 household rating, attracting approximately 2.2 million viewers. In the United Kingdom the episode was first shown on Sky One on November 3, 2003, attracting 670,000 viewers and was the channels seventh most popular program that week. The episode was first syndicated to Channel 4 in the United Kingdom on October 3, 2004, attracting 1.975 million viewers. In Canada, the episode was first shown on Space on October 14, 2004.

=== Reception ===
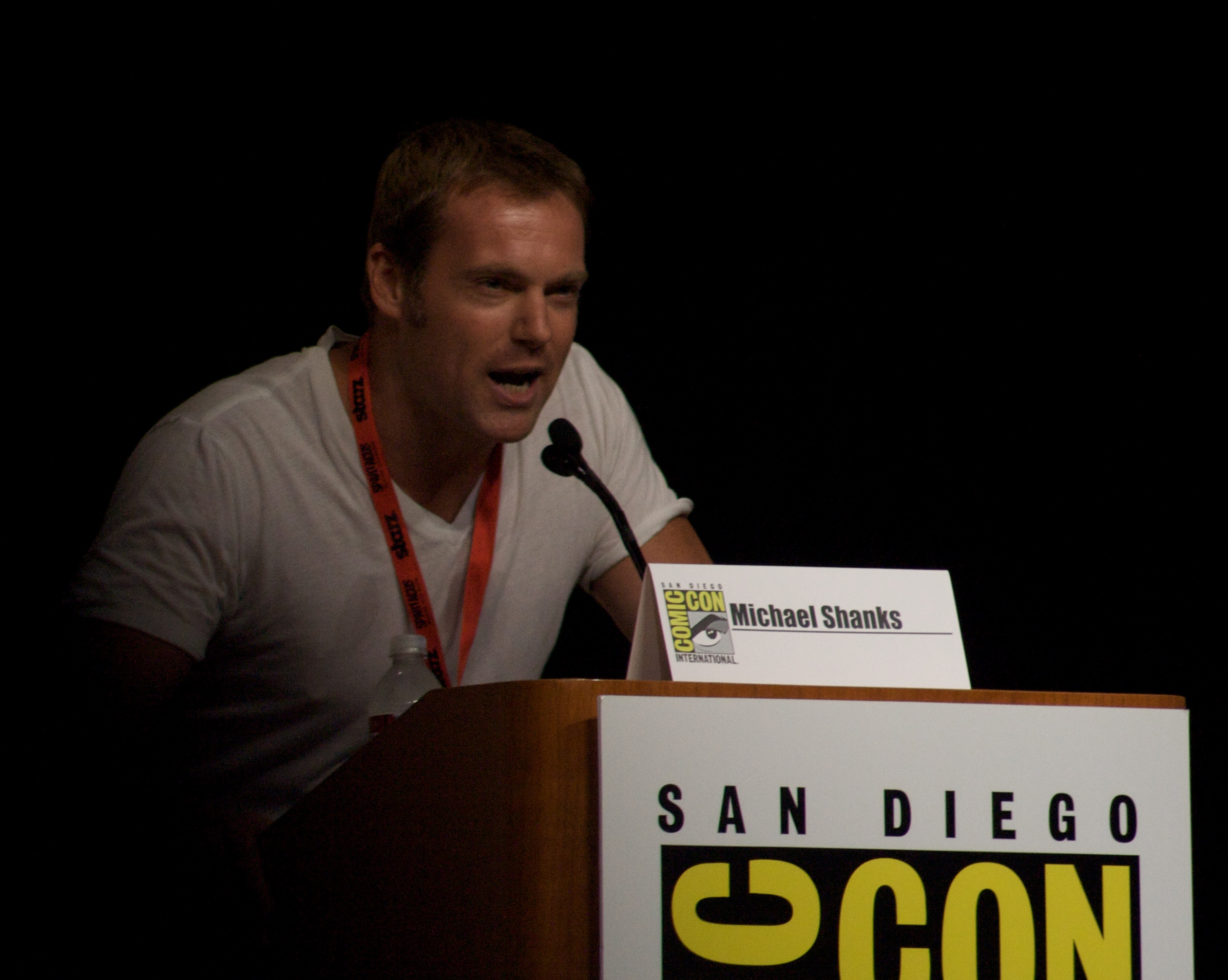
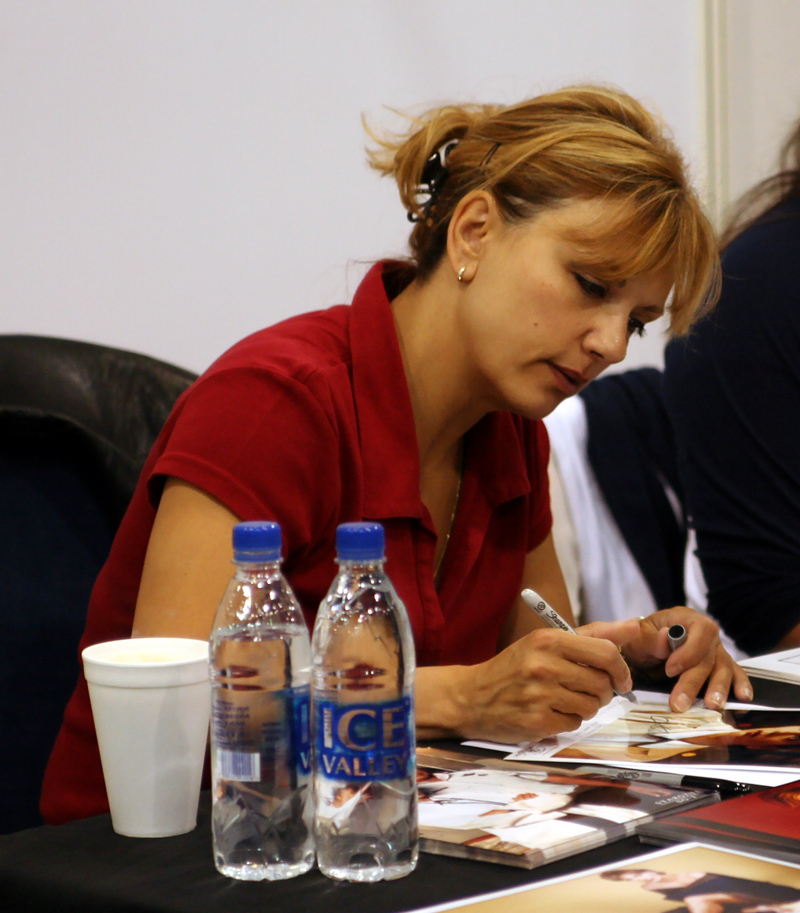
Michael Shanks' (left) performance in the episode won him the Leo Award for "Dramatic Series: Best Lead Performance - Male", whilst Teryl Rothery (right) was nominated for the "Best Supporting Performance by a Female" Leo.

Reviewing for About.com, Julia Houston called the episode "certainly enjoyable, if a little forgettable", applauding what she felt was a return to a more "classic" style SG-1 episode of "visiting planets and having adventures". Houston praised the episode for centering "nicely on Daniel Jackson in a role that lets Michael Shanks show off his impressive range", but felt it was similar to the season two episode "Holiday", as well as the Star Trek: The Next Generation episode "Masks". Jan Vincent-Rudzki for TV Zone praised Michael Shanks acting performance in the episode, but was critical of the lack of urgency displayed "despite the fact that there seems to be a time limit on how long these 'souls' can stay in Daniel". Vincent-Rudzki awarded the episode 6 out of 10.

Chris Allcock of Den of Geek hailed Michael Shanks performance in the episode, calling it a "tour de force for the actor to showcase his dramatic range", going on to also praise Teryl Rothery who he believed "more than rises to the challenge of matching Shanks's performance". Allcock placed the episode 18th on his list of the 25 Best Episodes of Stargate SG-1, writing "this episode stands tall on the strength of its talent, rather than its script or ideas". WhatCulture noted "Lifeboat" as one of the "stand-out episodes" of the season. Writing for Tor.com, Keith R.A. DeCandido negatively received the episode, writing "like “Legacy” in season 3, spends too much time as an acting exercise for Michael Shanks and not enough as an interesting story". Writing for Starburst, although David Richardson noted the premise was a "sci-fi cliché" he enjoyed the episode, proclaiming that it "boasts superb work from Shanks".

Writing for Stargate fansite Gateworld, Ali Snow acknowledged that whilst using possession as a storytelling device was something the show had frequently explored, he felt this episode was "far more poignant" than previous stories. Snow praised the "superbly handled" performances of Michael Shanks and Teryl Rothery, although did feel that some of the split personality scenes were "a bit overdone".

Actor Michael Shanks, who portrays Dr. Daniel Jackson won the Leo Award for "Dramatic Series: Best Lead Performance - Male" for his performance in the episode. Other nominees for the category included Matthew Bennett for his performance in Cold Squad, as well as Nicolas Campbell, Ian Tracey and Donnelly Rhodes for their performances in Da Vinci's Inquest. Teryl Rothery was also nominated for "Best Supporting Performance by a Female" in the 2004 Leo Awards for her performance as Dr. Janet Fraiser in the episode, with Carly Pope winning the award for her performance on The Collector.

=== Home media ===
"Lifeboat", along with the episodes "Revisions", "Enemy Mine" and "Space Race" were first released on Region 2 DVD on March 8, 2004, as part of the "Volume 33" standalone disc, before being released as part of the Season 7 boxset on October 19, 2004. The episodes audio commentary is provided by director Peter DeLuise and director of photography Peter Woeste.

The episodes along with the rest of season 7 were first made available digitally in January 2008 through iTunes and Amazon Unbox. The episode, along with every other episode of the series, were made available to stream for the first time through Netflix in the USA on August 15, 2010. The episode, along with the rest of the series has been upscaled for releases on various streaming platforms and the 2020 Blu-ray release.
