= Enemy Mine (Stargate SG-1) =

- Stargate SG-1 episode
- Episode no.: Season 7 Episode 7
- Directed by: Peter DeLuise
- Written by: Peter DeLuise
- Cinematography by: Peter F. Woeste
- Editing by: Eric Hill
- Production code: P273
- Original air date: July 25, 2003

Guest appearances
- Michael Rooker as Colonel Edwards; Steven Williams as General Vidrine; Alex Zahara as Iron Shirt; Kavan Smith as Evan Lorne; Patrick Currie as Chaka; Gary Jones as Technician; Michael Gordin Shore as Lt. Menard; Dean Redman as Lt. Woeste; Kirk Caouette as Lt. Ritter; Sean Tyson as Unas; Wycliff Hartwig as Unas

Episode chronology
← Previous "Lifeboat"	Next → "Space Race"
- Stargate SG-1 (season 7)

"Enemy Mine" is the 7th episode from the seventh season of military science fiction adventure television show Stargate SG-1 and is the 139th overall. It was first broadcast on July 25, 2003, on the Sci-fi Channel. The episode was written and directed by Peter DeLuise.

In the episode, a Stargate Command survey team led by Colonel Edwards (Michael Rooker) is looking to determine whether the planet they're on contains the Naqahdah mineral required for the construction of interstellar battleships, however they soon encounter a group of Unas who attack and kill one of Edwards men. In desperate need of the mineral, Dr. Daniel Jackson (Michael Shanks) enlists help from his old ally Chaka (Patrick Currie) to help curate a treaty.

The episode sees the return of Chaka, an Unas character first introduced in the season 4 episode "The First Ones", which was also written and directed by DeLuise. The character was last seen in the season 5 episode "Beast of Burden" having led an uprising against his human captors. The episode won a Leo Award for "Best Make-Up in a Dramatic Series".

== Plot ==
On a distant planet, a survey team from Stargate Command led by Colonel Edwards (Michael Rooker) have determined that the site they're on contains a significant amount of an element called Naqahdah, which he reminds Major Lorne (Kavan Smith) as being crucial for Earth's production of interstellar battleships, such as the Prometheus. Meanwhile, a member of Edwards team, Lieutenant Ritter (Kirk Caouette) is conducting a geological survey some distance from the main camp when he is dragged away into the forest by an unseen being. Colonel Jack O'Neill (Richard Dean Anderson), Dr. Daniel Jackson (Michael Shanks) and Teal'c (Christopher Judge) of SG-1 are called in to help search for the missing lieutenant. Upon arriving, Daniel examines some artefacts uncovered by the survey team and determines that the objects in question likely belonged to an Unas. Concerned that the Unas might be the ones responsible for Ritters disappearance, Daniel appeals that Edwards shut down operations, but he refuses. Searching the forest, Teal'c and Lorne discover an Unas structure, which Teal'c believes to be a warning to stay away. The pair then locate the missing lieutenant, whose dead body has been strung up. Edwards orders his men to find the Unas responsible, much to the objection of Daniel. One of the Stargate Command search parties are soon drawn into a fight with a large group of Unas, and O'Neill, Teal'c and Daniel rush through the forest to assist. As both sides take casualties, O'Neill is thrown aside, but Daniel pleas in the Unas language for the being not to continue its attack. The Unas seemingly listens and they withdraw from the forest. Edwards argues to go after them, but O'Neill orders everyone back to Stargate Command.

Back at Stargate Command, Edwards is informed by General Vidrine (Steven Williams) that The Pentagon wants his team to head back to the planet and begin mining. Daniel manages to convince the General that with the help of Chaka, an Unas they previously encountered on another world, they might be able to settle the problem peacefully. However, General Vidrine makes it clear that they are to take whatever steps are necessary to secure the Naqahdah. Chaka (Patrick Currie) arrives at Stargate Command and he and Daniel Gate back to the planet to search for the Unas. After waiting an Unas structure, another Unas eventually arrives (Alex Zahara) and they begin discussions. Daniel learns that the land they're attempting to mine is sacred, as the Goa'uld once forced the Unas to mine the Naqahdah there, before the Unas rose up and defeated the Goa'uld. Daniel returns to the base camp and tells Edwards what he's learnt and that they shouldn't begin mining there. Edwards however tells Daniel that their new analysis of the site shows a 53,000 metric ton deposit which they aren't going to give up. Daniel contacts Stargate Command and General Vidrine tells him that the Unas population will have to be tranquilized and relocated, however Daniel still believes he can come to an agreement with the Unas and so Vidrine gives him 24 hours. Daniel and Chaka once again meet with the other Unas and eventually come to the understanding that the Unas will work the mine themselves, and in exchange Stargate Command will provide them with food. Suddenly, they hear gunfire and the three of them run towards it to investigate. An Unas has been killed by Stargate Command forces whilst trying to retrieve a necklace that he had lost in their early battle. The Unas, having heard the gunfire have assembled their forces and prepare to attack the Stargate Command forces that have now retreated back to the main base camp and are preparing to evacuate through the Stargate once more. The Unas arrive in full force and surround the camp, revealing their numbers to be unlike anything Stargate Command previously expected. Daniel once again pleads with the Unas forces that they can work together to fight the Goa'uld, and by convincing Edwards and the Stargate Command forces to lay down the weapons, the Unas relent and spare the humans.

== Production ==
=== Development and writing ===
Following the season five episode "Beast of Burden", Peter DeLuise, who penned the episode was keen to follow-up on the events of his story and revisit the character of Chaka. As work on season six commenced, executive producer Brad Wright also expressed his desire for the characters return and had conversations with DeLuise about bringing the character back. According to writer Joseph Mallozzi, DeLuise made his pitch for the return of Chaka, however the episode was shelved as "it didn't make sense to do an Unas or Chaka story without the Daniel character", with Dr. Daniel Jackson, played by actor Michael Shanks no longer part of the shows main cast. Following the show being renewed for a seventh season and the return of Shanks, DeLuise once again pitched the episode before then being given the go-ahead to write it.

Executive producer Robert C. Cooper explained that the question of "where are we getting our resources from? Where are we getting our naquadah?" was part of the stories inception, which DeLuise married with the return of the Unas and Chaka character. DeLuise also drew inspiration from the 1996 film The Ghost and the Darkness, in which lions attack the workers constructing a bridge, with DeLuise instead imagining the Unas as attacking Stargate Command personnel who are attempting the mine the land. Early on in the writing process, DeLuise knew that he wanted the difficulty in communicating with the Unas to be at the heart of the story, and later described "the whole episode is about communicating with beings who don't speak English, which we always gloss-over because everyone speaks English, because otherwise ever episode would be about 'what did he say?', so it's a gimme on our show that pretty much everybody speaks English". He therefore decided to expanded upon the Unas language "there's about twenty-five words or so that I made up. I tried to anticipate all the words that they would need", adding to his Unas dictionary as writing continued.

DeLuise then came up with what would be the ending of his story, the idea that an enormous army of Unas would surround and trap the humans at the mining camp from escaping through the Stargate. With his ending envisioned, the writer then set about envisioning how they reached that point. As with many of the episode throughout the season, DeLuise had to take into account the limited availability of Richard Dean Anderson, constructing a battle sequence during which O'Neill would be injured and be unable to continue leading the mission. This also gave DeLuise the opportunity to put another character in charge of the operation, which he felt would be interesting for the character of Daniel Jackson, who would not be able to rely on O'Neill, and instead have to earn the trust of the new officer in charge. At one stage the episode was known as "Hallowed Ground", before changing to "Enemy Mine", in reference to the short story and movie of the same name.

=== Cast ===
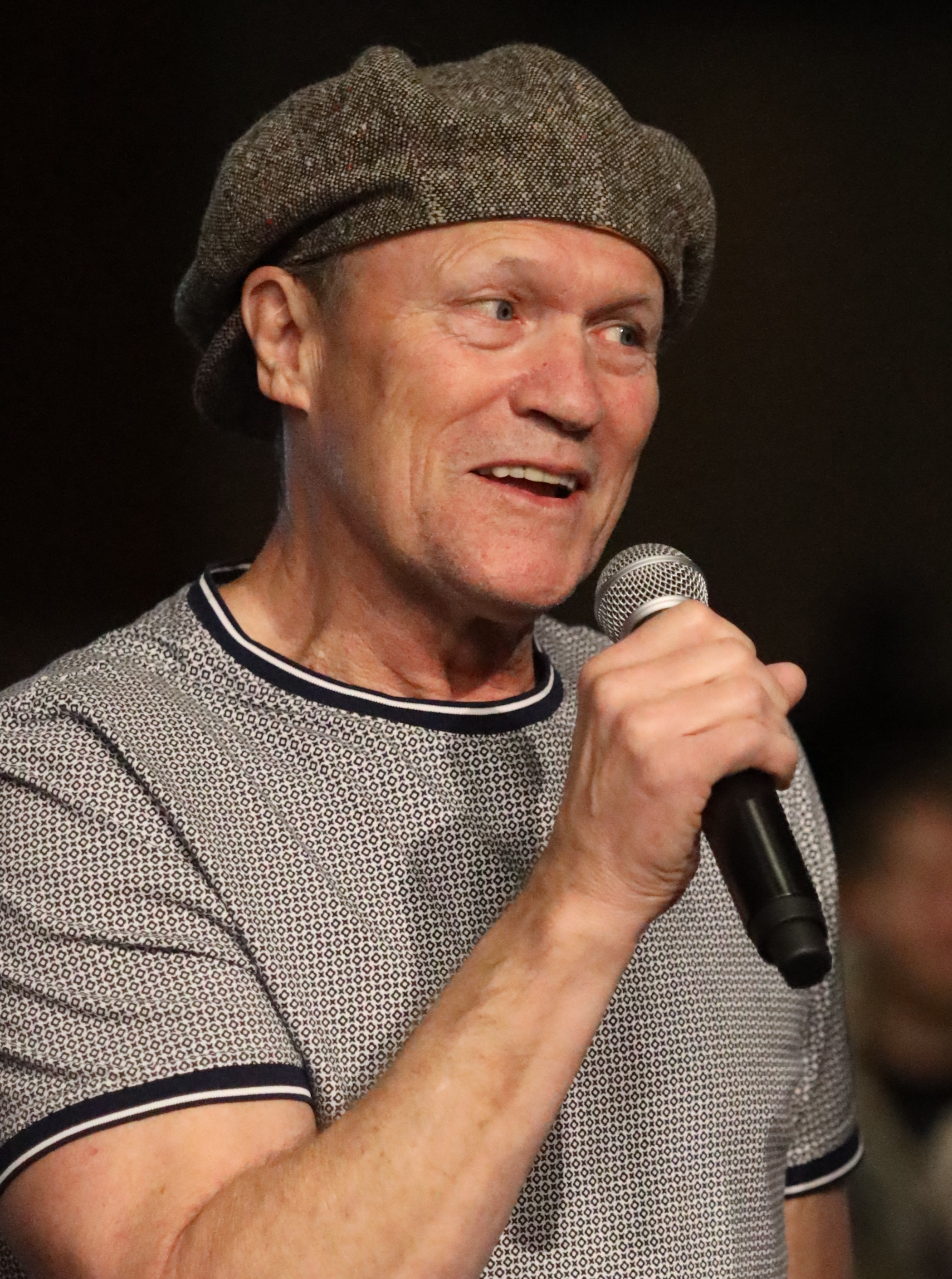
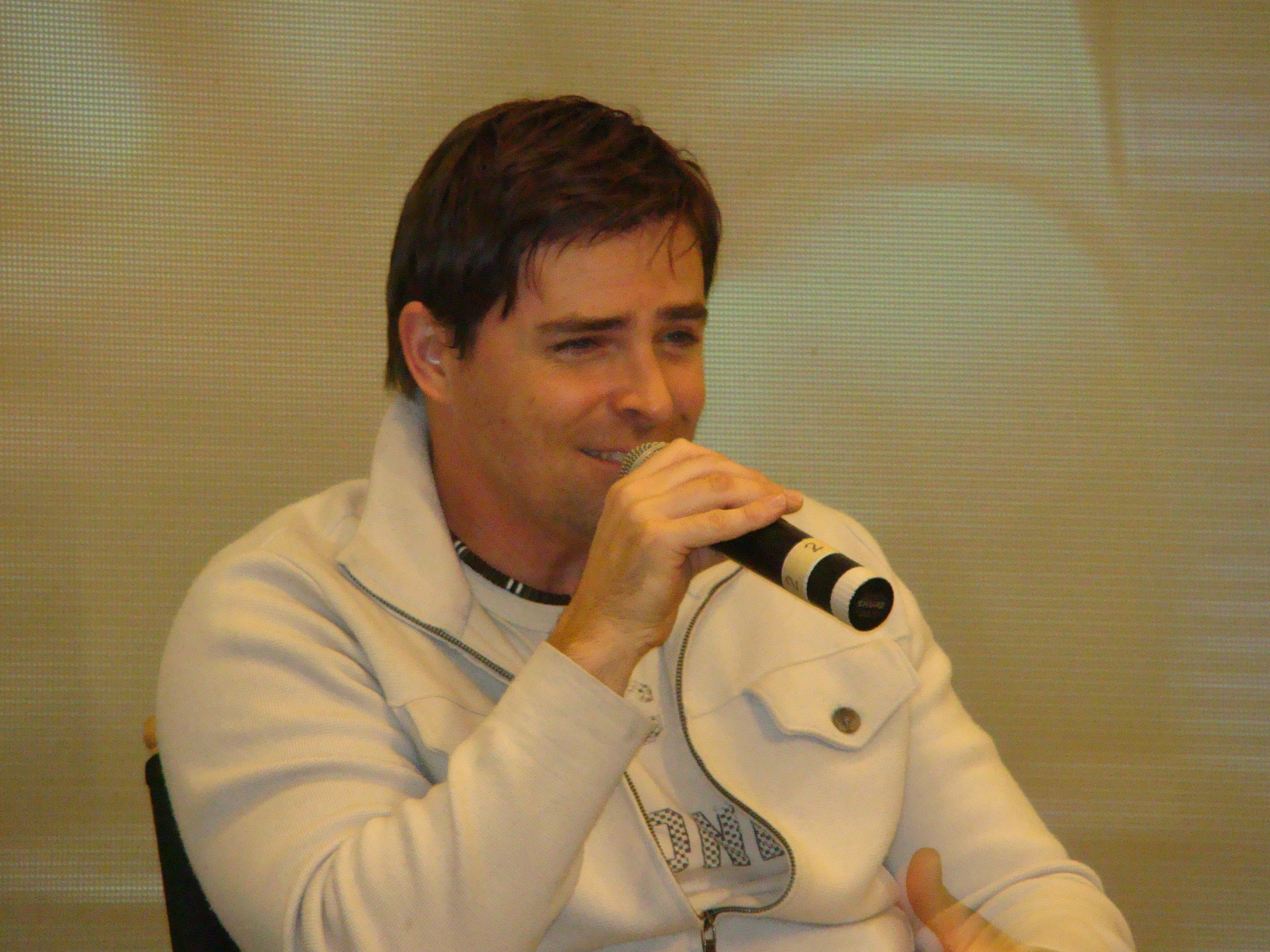
Michael Rooker (left) guest stars as Colonel Edwards, whilst Kavan Smith (right) is introduced as Lorne, who would eventually go on to become a reoccurring character in spin-off series Stargate Atlantis.

Michael Rooker guest stars as Colonel Edwards. Kavan Smith was cast as Lorne, who would eventually become a reoccurring character in spinoff series Stargate Atlantis. Smith had unsuccessfully auditioned for the part of Daniel Jackson back in 1997, and was friends with producer Michael Greenburg who had looked for a way to add Smith to the show. The actor commented that he "didn't have the best audition. I was quite surprised when they said at the end of the day, 'Yeah, we want you to do this.'" Smith described the incarnation of Lorne in "Enemy Mine" as a "surveyor-type character", with the character later being reworked to be "much more military guy". Dion Johnstone had previously portrayed the Unas character Chaka in both "Beast of Burden" and "The First Ones", but was unavailable at the time of shooting, due to rehearsals for the Stratford Festival. Instead, recurring Stargate SG-1 actor Patrick Currie was cast in the role. Currie watched "The First Ones" to study the character and described his portrayal of Chaka as "following Dion's lead and then doing my own thing with it". DeLuise decided that Chaka would be "far more sophisticated since we last saw him", and would now be "dressed in Human-type clothes" as well as also being able to speak better English. Alex Zahara, who frequently appears as different characters in the show was cast as the Unas character Iron Shirt. In order to make he character more identifiable, Iron Shirt was given a large scar across his eye and dressed in worn Jaffa armour. Zahara would go on to call the character one of his favourites to portray from his time on the show. Sean Tyson and Wycliff Hartwig also portray Unas.

Michael Gordin Shore makes his third appearance in the series, this time as Kenneth Menard, having previous portrayed a F-302 pilot in "Fragile Balance" and weapons officer in "Memento". Dean Redman was cast as Lieutenant Woeste, with Redman also having previously portrayed a number of background characters over the course of the series. Kirk Caouette portrays Lieutenant Ritter. DeLuise named many of the episodes characters after people, with Lorne named after his brother-in-law, Lorne Loder, Kenneth Menard and Woeste were named after the shows directors of photography Jim Menard and Peter Woeste, whilst Ritter was named after Kate Ritter, who had frequently interviewed the cast and crew as part of the SG-1 Explorer Unit fansite. Steven Williams returns as General Vidrine, having last appeared as the character in season four episode "Absolute Power". Dan Shea and Gary Jones reprise their roles of Siler and Technician.

=== Filming ===
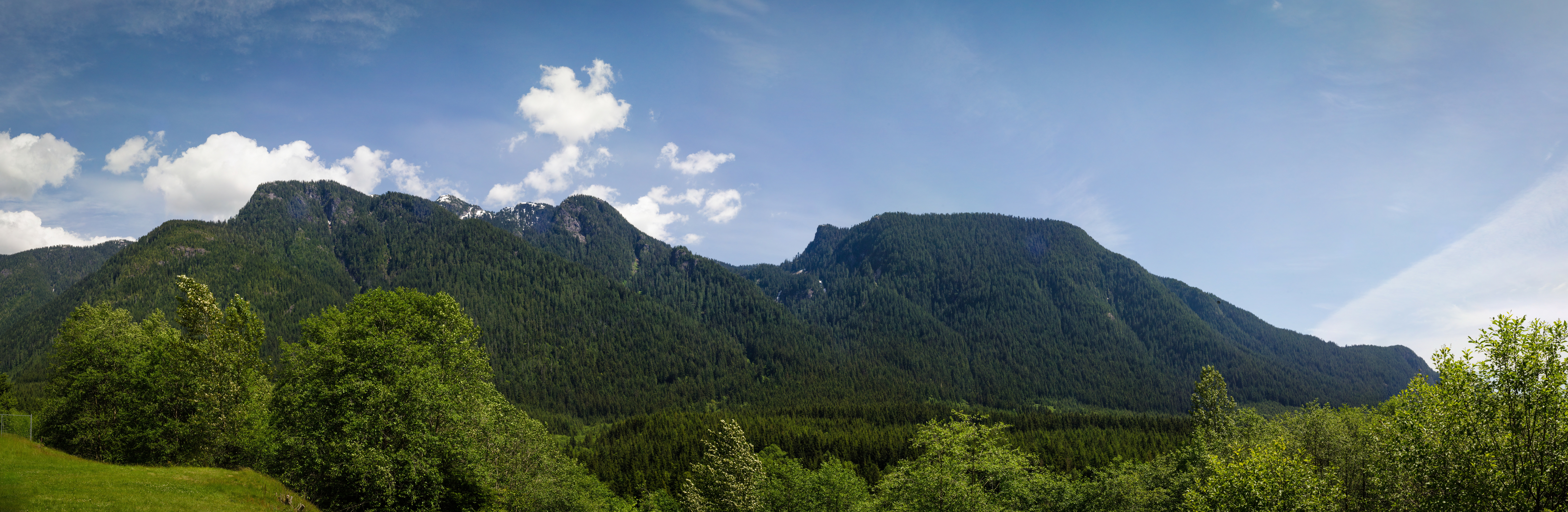
Filming took place around Mid-Valley Viewpoint (pictured) in North Vancouver, British Columbia.

As well as writing the episode, Peter DeLuise also directed, with Peter Woeste serving as the episodes director of photography. Filming took place in early May 2003, with production split between "Enemy Mine", and "Avenger 2.0". The split meant that Shanks was only sparingly featured in "Avenger 2.0", whilst Amanda Tapping only appeared as Major Samantha Carter in a single scene in "Enemy Mine". Outside of the main set at The Bridge Studios, a disused gravel pit near Mid-Valley Viewpoint in North Vancouver served as the mining base-camp on an alien planet.

As well as taking inspiration for his story from The Ghost and the Darkness, DeLuise's shot of Lieutenant Ritter being dragged away into the forest was influenced by a similar shot of a lion dragging one of the labourers away in the film. The Unas battle sequence in the woods required a lot of stunt-work, with stunt co-ordinator Dan Shea having performers James Bamford and Christopher Sayour thrown into trees using air ramps & mini-trampolines. During filming, Michael Shanks suggested to DeLuise that during Daniel Jackson's meeting with Chaka and Iron Shirt, Jackson would produce an energy bar as a callback to "The First Ones" and "Beast of Burden".

DeLuise had been inspired by the scale of the armies and crowds shown in The Lord of the Rings film series, and in his story had included large numbers of Unas, however the time and cost of applying the Unas makeup limited production to just four Unas characters in addition to Chaka. To increase the number of Unas shown onscreen at any one time, the subjects were photographed in different positions in the frame, with small adjustments being made to their costumes and makeup and then the different images were stitched together in post-production. To achieve the largest crowd shots at the end of the episode, the live photography was combined with digital crowd replication. DeLuise noted that he wanted to make sure that Alex Zahara and Patrick Currie's pronunciation of the Unas language was entirely accurate, which frequently lead to both actors breaking character during filming, with the writer-director commenting "the bloopers are so great. I really hope one day they'll let us put them on the DVDs".

== Release ==
=== Broadcast and ratings ===
"Enemy Mine" aired first on the Sci-fi Channel in the United States on July 25, 2003, earning a Nielsen ratings of 1.2. Although the episode was down 0.3 on the previous weeks episode, it remained Sci-fi Channel's highest rated show. Upon being syndicated in the US in November 2004, the episode earned a rating of 2.2, being viewed in approximately 2.4 million households. In the United Kingdom, the episode first aired on November 10, 2003, on Sky One and was later syndicated onto Channel 4 on October 17, 2004, where it was viewed by 2.019 million households. In Canada, the episode was first shown on Space on October 21, 2004.

=== Reception ===
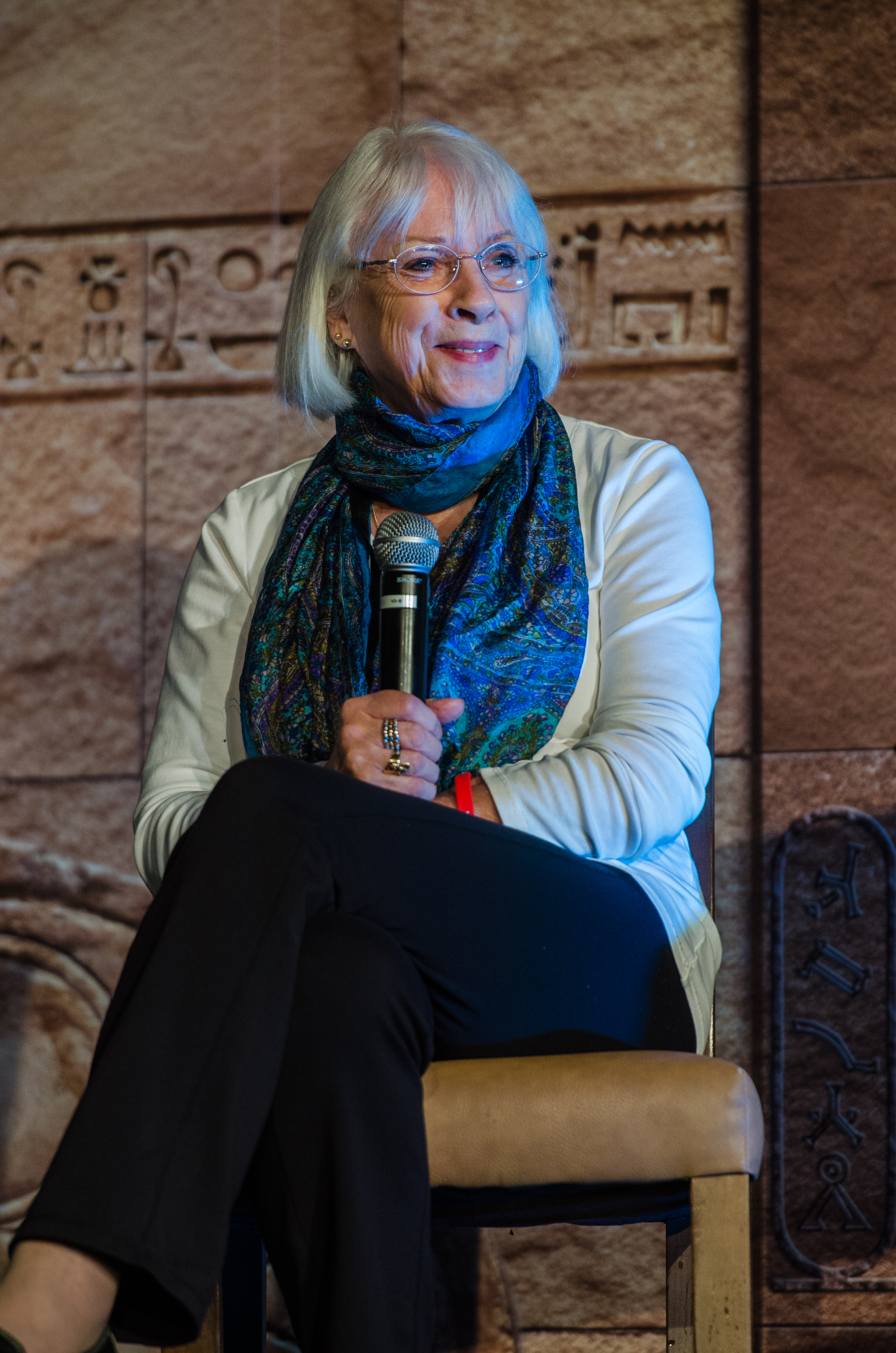
Key make-up artist Jan Newman and her team won a Leo Award for their work on the episode.

Reviewing the episode for Dreamwatch, Brigid Cherry positively received the episode, calling Daniel Jackson's interactions with the Unas "powerful stuff", as well as highlighting O'Neill going head-to-head with Colonel Edwards writing "this scenario has a lot of strengths thanks to a guest appearance from Michael Rooker". David Richardson for Starburst called the episode a "mundane fare". Julia Houston for About.com called the episode "okay-but-not-great", believing that the writing was "too heavy-handed". Houston did however enjoy the earlier scenes between Daniel Jackson and Jack O'Neill, as well as the interplay between Daniel and Chaka. Keith R.A. DeCandido for Tor.com wrote that the episode provided "that the Unas still aren't interesting". Jan Vincent-Rudzki for TV Zone awarded the episode 6 out of 10 in his mixed review, believing it suffered from what he called "Star Trek syndrome" in that "everyone in authority, apart from our heroes, are complete fools".

Fan response published on fansite Gateworld was also very mixed. Contributor Alli Snow confessed he had not enjoyed any previous story about the Unas, calling previous episodes "painful" and "dull", awarding "Enemy Mine" just 1 star. Snow was critical of the pacing, lack of O'Neill, Carter and Teal'c screentime but did however appreciate DeLuise's direction and the Unas prosthetic makeup. In another published review, contributor Lex was also critical of the lack of participation from the other main cast members besides Shanks, but did call it a "wonderful character episode" and awarded it 3 stars.

Jan Newman, Todd Masters, Lise Kuhr, Rachel Griffin, Dorothee Deichmann and Mike Fields won the 2004 Leo Award for "Best Make-Up in a Dramatic Series" for their work on the episode. Other nominees included The Collector episode "The Rapper" and the Smallville episode "Exile".

=== Home media ===
"Enemy Mine", along with the episodes "Revisions", "Lifeboat" and "Space Race" were first released on Region 2 DVD on March 8, 2004, as part of the "Volume 33" standalone disc, before being released as part of the Season 7 boxset on October 19, 2004. The episodes audio commentary is provided by Gary Jones and director Peter DeLuise. After the episode aired, a deleted scene featuring Teal'c and Daniel conversing about the Unas was posted to the Sci-fi Channel website.

The episodes along with the rest of season 7 were first made available digitally in January 2008 through iTunes and Amazon Unbox. The episode, along with every other episode of the series, were made available to stream for the first time through Netflix in the USA on August 15, 2010. The episode, along with the rest of the series has been upscaled for releases on various streaming platforms and the 2020 Blu-ray release.
