= Space Race (Stargate SG-1) =

- Stargate SG-1 episode
- Episode no.: Season 7 Episode 8
- Directed by: Andy Mikita
- Written by: Damian Kindler
- Cinematography by: Jim Menard
- Editing by: Rick Martin
- Original air date: August 1, 2003
- Running time: 44 minutes

Guest appearances
- Alex Zahara as Warrick; Patrick Currie as Eamon; Peter Kelamis as Coyle Boron; Scott MacDonald as Golon Jarlath; Terence Kelly as Miles Hagan; Allan Lysell as Del Tynan; Lindsay Maxwell as La'el; Colin Murdock as Ardal Hadraig; Benjamin Ayres as Muirios; Nick Misura as Taupen; Hillary Cooper as receptionist

Episode chronology
← Previous "Enemy Mine"	Next → "Avenger 2.0"
- Stargate SG-1 (season 7)

"Space Race" is the 8th episode from the seventh season of the science fiction television series Stargate SG-1 and is the 140th episode overall. It was first broadcast on the Sci-Fi Channel on August 1, 2003. The episode was written by Damian Kindler and was directed by Andy Mikita.

In the episode, Warrick (Alex Zahara) comes to Stargate Command to ask for their assistance in winning a race on his homeworld, Hebridan. After agreeing to provide him the power-generator he requires, Samantha Carter (Amanda Tapping) convinces Warrick that she should be his copilot for the race.

The episode is a sequel to the season 6 story "Forsaken", also written by Kindler and directed by Mikita. For "Space Race", Kindler wanted to revisit the character of Warrick and journey to his planet for the first time. The episode was one of the most visual effects-heavy and expensive episodes of the show so far. The response from both audiences and critics was extremely mixed.

== Plot ==
Warrick (Alex Zahara) arrives at Stargate Command to ask for their help in winning a race on their homeworld, Hebridan. Warrick asks to use one of Stargate Command's naqahdah power generators on his ship, the Seberus, having previously used one to great effect. In exchange Warrick promises to provide specifications for his peoples ion engine technology. Major Carter (Amanda Tapping) agrees and asks to accompany him as his copilot. SG-1 travel to Hebridan, where they are introduced to Eamon (Patrick Currie), the Seberus' creator and Warrick's younger brother. Jack O'Neill (Richard Dean Anderson) and Daniel Jackson (Michael Shanks) leave to meet with members of the Hebridian government, whilst Teal'c (Christopher Judge), Carter and Eamon work on the Seberus. After the group leave the Seberus' hanger, a man sneaks in and heads towards the ship.

As the race begins, the first stage tests the competitors shields and weapons against weapon satellites, which Warrick and Carter successfully handle. The second stage involves passing around a sun, however as the Seberus approaches it, her systems shut down and Warrick discovers they've been deliberately sabotaged. As Carter and Warrick try to fix the issue, Teal'c and Eamon begin investigating who might have sabotaged them. After successfully fixing the Seberus, they perform a gravitational slingshot and head back into the race. Meanwhile, Eamon discovers that his supervisor Del Tynan (Allan Lysell) had accessed his computer. To find the evidence they need, he and Teal'c go to Tech Con and manage to access Del Tynan's computer, helping them unravel the fact that he's sabotaged nearly every ship in the race except one, Muirios (Benjamin Ayres). Suddenly Tynan returns to his office and catches the pair.

Back in the race, Warrick and Carter decide to rescue Golon Jarlath (Scott MacDonald) after his ship is also disabled. At Tech Con, Tynan explains to Teal'c and Eamon that he thinks that the Serrakin are destroying the human race by crossbreeding and he's making sure that the winner is a human for the first step of overthrowing the Serrakin. He contacts Warrick to drop out or else he'll kill Eamon and Teal'c. Suddenly, O'Neill, Daniel and President Hagan arrive with guards and arrested Tynan and his men. Hagan now has the evidence to put Tynan in jail. With Eamon and Teal'c safe, the Seberus is back in the race but in third place. Jarlath reconfigures the communications array to freeze Muirios' ship, with the Seberus taking second place. Later, at the SGC, Carter receives word that Warrick had been hired by Lael to co-pilot on her new contract from Tech Con and Earth has an ion engine to study.

== Production ==
=== Writing and development ===
In early pitch meetings for season 7, showrunner Robert C. Cooper told writer Damian Kindler that he would like to revisit the character of Warrick from the episode "Forsaken" which Kindler wrote. Cooper specifically wanted to visit Warrick's homeworld, Hebridan and learn more about the Serrakin and human people. Kindler was inspired by the Boonta Eve Classic podrace from Star Wars: Episode I – The Phantom Menace, building his episode around a race, in the space around Hebridan. Across all of season 7 Kindler was "very focused on" writing stories centred around Samantha Carter (Amanda Tapping), commenting that "I had kind of a mini agenda coming into season seven, which was I really wanted to write some good Carter stories". Kindler wanted to use "Space Race" as a way of expanding Carter's personality to the audience, joking that "it doesn't all have to be about calibrating things, it can be fun". This lead Kindler to making Carter the main focus of the episode, taking part in the race with Warrick.

Throughout the episodes development, how far to push the camp, comic-book like style of Kindler's episode was discussed in the writing and later production meetings, with Kindler commenting that he believed the story provided temptation go too-far and "turn it up to 11". Early in the episodes conception, Kindler had wanted to include alien media broadcasts of the race, as a "send-up of reality television", noting RoboCop as inspiration. Cooper nixed the idea until the first cut of the episode came in short, which allowed Kindler to revisit the idea. Kindler, Paul Mullie and Joseph Mallozzi conceived a number of scenes they believed to be hilarious, Cooper however was unhappy with them and Kindler continued developing them. Kindler and Cooper had between four and five drafts before completing the final take on the alien media scenes.

=== Design ===
Much of the episode is centred around the Hebridian spaceship Serberus, belonging to Warrick that was previously featured in "Forsaken". Production designer Bridget McGuire commented that the Serberus had to be redesigned as the episode required "a set that was being asked to do more than it was originally designed for", with the original set constructed at a 30-degree angle to give the impression the ship had crashed. In "Space Race" one of the key considerations was giving an authentic sense of motion onboard the ship, with Kindler specifically citing the air sequences in the TV miniseries Band of Brothers as an inspiration. The set was reconstructed on a gimbal which could be controlled remotely to simulate movement onboard. As the gimbal created such powerful movement onboard, safety harnesses and working seatbelts had to be fitted on the set to keep the actors and crew safe during filming.

The Serburus set consisted of a single compartment, which would initially serve as the rear hold and engine room. A removable wall could then be taken out after the scenes were complete, opening it up to be redressed as the cockpit area. In order to further show motion in the ship, McGuire and her team placed electrical cables, straps and placed cargo around the ship so that "when all these things swayed back and forth you'd know that the ship was moving". The set was constructed so that various panels could be removed to allow for filming, although the small scale meant that direction would have to be give to the set via walkie talkie. The exterior of the set was entirely computer generated, with the exception of the boarding stairs leading down from the ship. The Serburus was originally going to be redressed as the drill in "Fallout", however McGuire made the petitioned to instead build an entirely new set.

For the race sequence, each of the competing spaceships was independently designed, predominantly by production designer James Robbins, with Kindler noting that he wanted the ships to appear similar to each other, as if they'd been customised - referencing the NASCAR Cup Series as influence. The Laguna Seca race track in Central California was also cited as the basis for the race layout in the episode. Every movement of the race was carefully storyboarded so that the visual effects matched the live action photography.

=== Cast ===
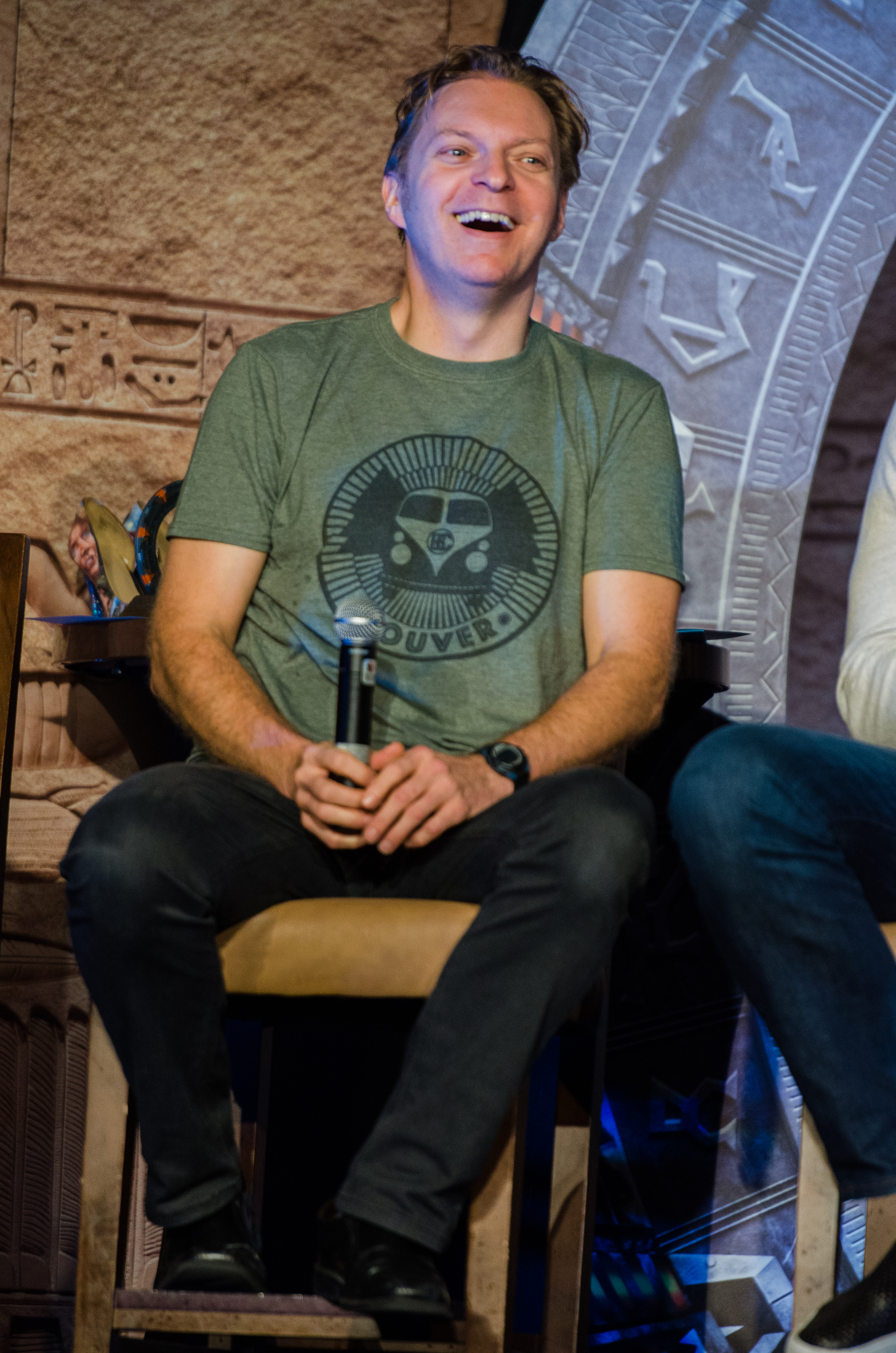
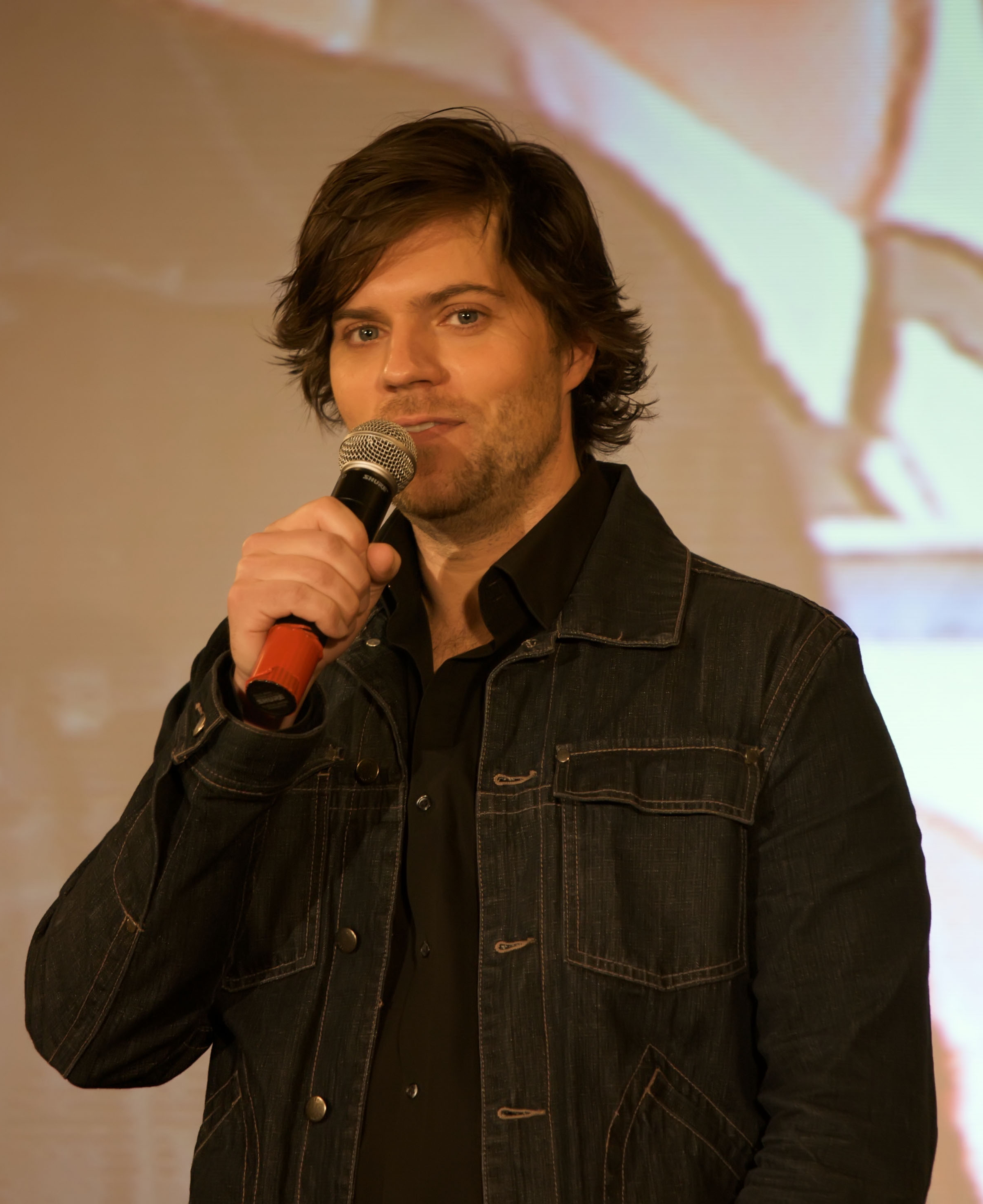
Frequent guest actors Alex Zahara (left) and Patrick Currie (right) portray alien siblings Warrick and Eamon.

Dion Johnstone had previously portrayed the Serrakin pilot Warrick, but was unavailable at the time of shooting, due to rehearsals for the Stratford Festival. As Warrick was central to the story, the part was recast to frequent guest actor Alex Zahara, who had played numerous roles across Stargate SG-1. Zahara spent some time watching Johnstone's performance in "Forsaken", but Kindler rationalised that the character would be somewhat different, commenting "when we first met Warrick he was on a planet for 3 years, fighting off people, barely able to eat anything decent. Since he's gotten back, he's back to his fighting weight".

The part of Eamon, Warrick's brother and the creator of the Serburus, was cast to Patrick Currie. Currie who also portrays the Replicator character Fifth elsewhere in the series, also took over the character of Chaka (also from Johnstone) in the previous episode "Enemy Mine". Currie had originally been approached to take on the role of Warrick but declined as he had no previous experience in prosthetic makeup and was unsure he could handle playing an already established character, commenting that he didn't want to let the shows producers down. He believed having to turn the role down was a "blessing in disguise", as he was then offered the slightly smaller part of Eamon, which whilst requiring prosthetic makeup, he would have "free rein" as far as the character was concerned. Currie wanted to play up Eamon being the "bratty little brother" as much as possible, describing him being "so tired of hearing his older brother getting all the accolades, and is just a little bitter and mad". The Serrakin prosthetic makeup worn by Currie and Zahara, amongst others, took around two and a half hours to apply.

Colin Murdock portrays race pundit Ardal Hadraig, whilst Peter Kelamis portrays the part of former race champion turned pundit, Coyle Boron, with Kelamis previously having played the role of Dr. Brent Langham in the episode "Smoke and Mirrors". Don Cherry and Ron MacLean's punditry on Hockey Night in Canada served as inspiration for the characters and their commentary of the race. Kelamis would later go on to play the reoccurring part of Adam Brody on Stargate Universe. Additionally Scott MacDonald plays Golon Jarlath, Terence Kelly features as Miles Hagan, Allan Lysell as Del Tynan, Benjamin Ayres as Muirios, Nick Misura as Taupen and Lindsay Maxwell as La'el Montrose. Showrunner Robert C. Cooper's wife, Hillary Cooper plays the receptionist. Damian Kindler's wife also filmed scenes for the episode, but was ultimately cut out.

=== Filming ===
Andy Mikita directed the episode, having also been responsible for "Forsaken". Filming took place in the first week of May 2003 and was shot almost entirely by the shows first unit. Much of the episode took place outside of the show's main sets. Powertech Labs Inc, an electrical testing facility in Surrey, British Columbia was used as the Serburus' hangar and mission control on the alien world of Hebridan. Director of photography Jim Menard wanted to show as much of the building interior as possible, without having to bring in huge amounts of lighting equipment. The film crew experimented with an alternative to their usual film, trailing Fuji Reala film stock, suited to mixed daylight and tungsten lighting, which meant they could rely more on the buildings house lights.

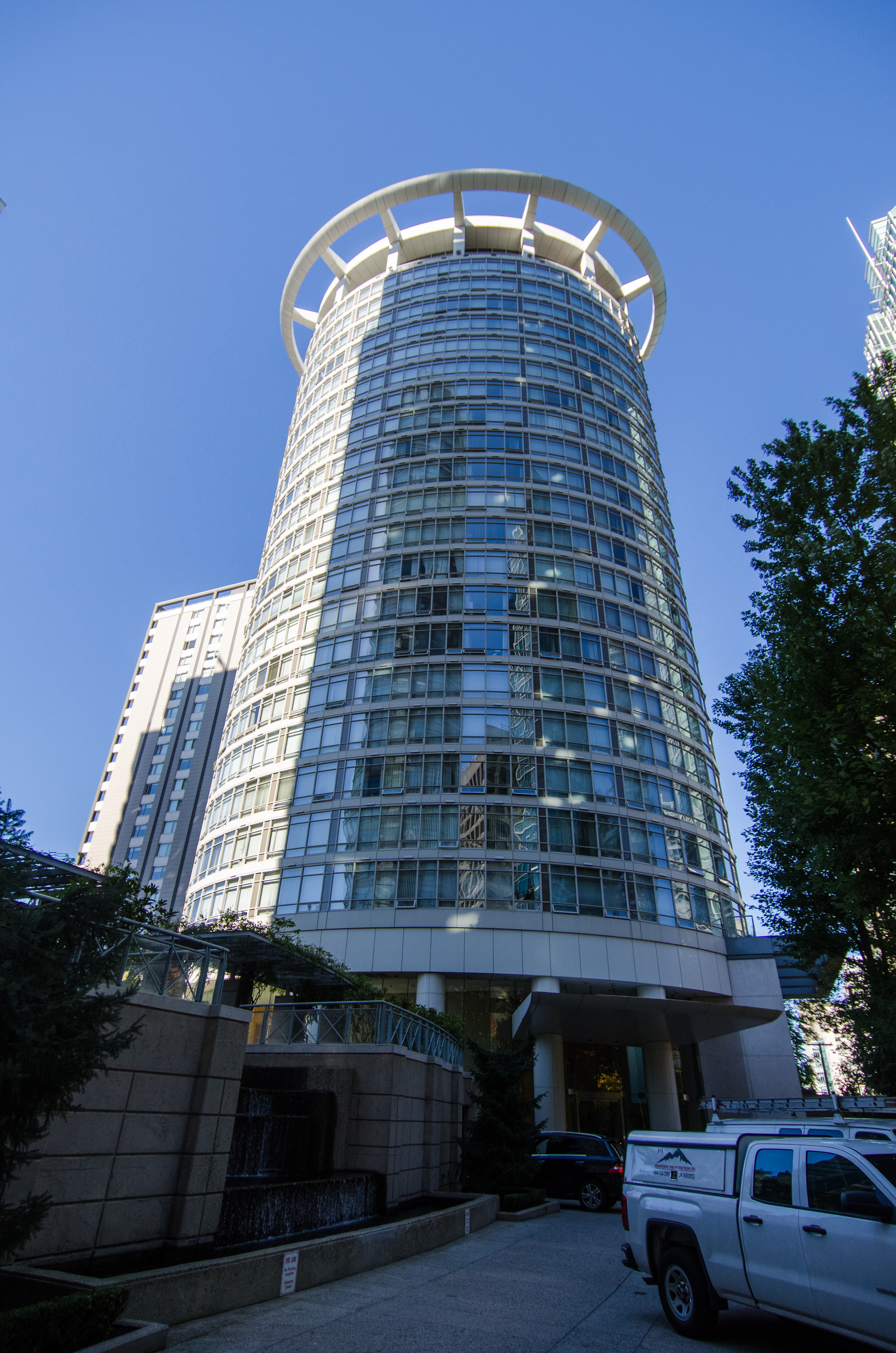
The Palisades down Alberni Street in Downtown Vancouver was amongst the locations used in the episode.

Both the interior and exterior of The Palisades, an apartment building, in Alberni Street, Downtown Vancouver was used as the headquarters for the Hebridian Tech Con Group corporation. As traffic and buildings that would break the allusion of it being another world could be seen around The Palisades, many of the windows were tinted, with a temporary wall built around one of the main courtyards to help obscure the views.

On set visual effects supervisor James Tichenor commented that trying to portray the sense that they're in an "intense race in an environment that doesn't lend itself to intensity" proved "especially challenging". For the race scenes onboard the Serburus, Mikita used image shakers on the cameras, with Menard and the gaffer moving lights on ropes to further give the impression of motion and simulate the ship's movement.

=== Post-production ===
James Tichenor oversaw the episode's visual effects, which was handled by effects studio Image Engine. The episode was one of the most effects-heavy and expensive of the show so far. Production designer James Robbins conceptualised the alien ship Seberus for the episode "Forsaken". Rainmaker Digital Effects 3D lead animator Wes Sargent then used Robbins drawings to create the computer model, with Bruce Woloshyn & Michelle Comens designing the shots and composition work from Trevor Strand. Wes Sargent noted that as the original ship model had not been seen in much detail, therefore the Image Engine team "changed the look somewhat" as well as adding additional detail". The digital matte painting of the alien world Hebridan was created entirely in house by Playback Supervisor Krista McLean.

Tichenor commented that they shot high-dynamic-range imaging of the alien hanger, a process which was relatively new for the Stargate SG-1 visual effects team in order to light the alien ship visual effects shot. The completed effects were delivered on July 14, 2003. In order to give a sense of position in space and speed, the race course was littered with objects, such as satellites, planets, asteroids, buoys to give a sense of speed and position.

The episode originally came in six minutes under-time and had to be lengthened by new scenes, such as the alien media and race commentary scenes which were shot later during pick-ups. The pick-ups and new scenes resulted in the episode then coming in over-time. A number of scenes were then cut which mostly centred around Daniel Jackson and Jack O'Neill at a reception banquet, including the pair contacting Carter during the race, a scene where O'Neill makes a joke about bonspiel and a small cameo from Kindlers wife.

== Release ==
=== Broadcast and reception ===
"Space Race" was first broadcast on August 1, 2003 on the Sci-Fi Channel in the United States. According to Nielsen ratings, the episode had a 1.7 household rating. In the United Kingdom, the episode was first shown on Sky One on November 17, 2003 and drew an estimated 690,000 viewers, making it Sky One's 7th most popular broadcast that week.

Writer and producer Joseph Mallozzi commented that "Space Race" "to no one's surprise, was a little divisive when it came to fan opinion. Some fans loved it. Others hated it". Starburst praised the episode, writing "Fast-paced and bolstered by convincing special effects, Space Race is a terrifically entertaining hour of Stargate". The reviewer felt that it gave Amanda Tapping and Christopher Judge the chance to shine, commenting that "Tapping keeps a sly grin on Carter's face, even in the most dangerous of spots" and that "Judge plays it cool, as always". Writing a glowing review, Darren Rea of Sci-fi Online commented that "this episode has so much going for it", awarding 10 out of 10. Rea praised the episodes visual effects, believing that they "some of the best that SG-1 has to offer", as well as highlighting the quality of the comedic writing. WhatCulture described the episode as "standard", "fun episode". Julia Houston for About.com felt that although the episode was centred around "a seemingly unimportant event", it was instead "for fun and a little Girl Power". Houston praised the episode's humour, particularly enjoying the race commentators, believing that they "pretty much steal the show, especially with all the Tech Con ads and the floating Jumbo-Tron".

Dreamwatch reviewer Brigid Cherry called the episode "all rather dull and predictable", noting similarities to the Star Trek: Voyager episode "Drive" which had aired in 2000. Cherry felt as though Carter was "shoehorned into the story" but did respond positively to the subplot, enjoying Teal'c reprising his "Murray" alias. Writing for TV Zone, Jan Vincent-Rudzki called the "Space Race" a "real dud" going so far to say that "nothing is right" with the episode, awarding it 2 out of 10. The reviewer questioned where Samantha Carter's interest in racing had come from, feeling as though the character had shown "no hint of this interest before, and she doesn't seem very interested for the rest of the episode". Vincent-Rudzki continued to criticize "Daniel the cypher", feeling as though the character only appeared from time-to-time to ask Sam questions and called the race itself "barely interesting", believing that "any tension that might have been built was stopped dead in the tracks by splitting the race story with another plot".

DVD Talk writer John Sinnott placed the episode amongst his "low points" of season 7, writing that he felt it was "terribly clichéd, almost to the point of being painful". Tor.com reviewer Keith R.A. DeCandido declared "Space Race" the worst episode of Stargate SG-1's seventh season, believing it was the sort of story and quality found in the original Battlestar Galactica and Buck Rogers in the 25th Century. DeCandido found on redeeming moment, commenting "Christopher Judge manages the biggest laugh of the entire season just by identifying himself as Murray". Featured reviews on fansite Gateworld.net were mixed. Contributor Alli Snow praised the episodes "motion-picture worthy" visual effects, as well as highlighting Christopher Judge's performance. Awarding 3 out of 5 stars, Snow noted that the episode "doesn't even go close to taking itself seriously, which also contrasts sharply with the last few episodes aired", but as with previous episode felt the lack of Richard Dean Anderson's Jack O'Neill was continuing to have a negative impact on the season. Another contributor criticised the episode for being "littered with caricatures, jokes that simply weren't funny, and scenes that were, quite frankly, a waste of screen time", believing the main redeeming feature to be the exploration of Samantha Carter being a "speed junkie". Reviews by TV Zone and Gateworld both criticised decision to make the Hebridan & Serrakin alien cultures derivative of United States culture, with TV Zone questioning how American culture had made its way across the galaxy calling the inhabitants "cliché". TV Zone particularly disliked the race commentators, calling them "excruciating" comparing them to the commentators from the Boonta Eve Podrace in Star Wars: Episode I – The Phantom Menace. On the contrary, Starburst found the culture and commentary of the race "especially funny".

=== Home media ===
"Space Race", along with previous episodes "Lifeboat", "Enemy Mine" and "Revisions" were first released on Region 2 DVD on March 8, 2004 as part of the "Volume 33" standalone disc, before being released as part of the Season 7 boxset on October 19, 2004. A "SG-1 Directors Series: Space Race" is included amongst the DVD's special features, providing a behind the scenes look at the film of the episode, whilst the DVD audio commentary was provided by director Andy Mikita, director of photography Jim Menard and writer Damian Kindler.

After the episode first aired, a deleted scene was made available on the Scifi Channel's website, involving Teal'c & O'Neill discussing sabotage. The episodes along with the rest of season 7 were first made available digitally in January 2008 through iTunes and Amazon Unbox. The episode, along with every other episode of the series, were made available to stream for the first time through Netflix in the USA on August 15, 2010. Along with the rest of the series, the episode has been upscaled for releases on various streaming platforms and the 2020 Blu-ray release.
