= Stargate SG-1 season 7 =

Season of television series

Stargate SG-1
- Season 7
- DVD cover
- Starring: Richard Dean Anderson; Amanda Tapping; Christopher Judge; Don S. Davis; Michael Shanks
- No. of episodes: 22

Release
- Original network: Syfy
- Original release: June 13, 2003 – March 9, 2004

Season chronology
- ← Previous; Season 6 Next → Season 8

The seventh season of Stargate SG-1, an American-Canadian television series, began airing on June 13, 2003 on Sci Fi. The seventh season concluded after 22 episodes on March 9, 2004 on British Sky One, which overtook the Sci-Fi Channel in mid-season. The series was developed by Brad Wright and Jonathan Glassner. Season seven regular cast members include Richard Dean Anderson, Amanda Tapping, Christopher Judge, Don S. Davis, and Michael Shanks.

== Production ==
With "Fallen", Michael Shanks (Dr. Daniel Jackson) rejoins the cast, and Corin Nemec (Jonas Quinn) gets billed as a "Guest Star" (besides "Fallen"/"Homecoming", he would have his only other guest appearance later in "Fallout"). George Touliatos previously played Pyrus, Shyla's father, in "Need." The scenes with the Goa'uld motherships flying in hyperspace are actually stock footage from the Season 2 episode "The Serpent's Lair." Director Martin Wood has a cameo in "Fallen" as the man in the elevator with Jonas at the beginning of the episode. Peter DeLuise, who directed "Fragile Balance", provided the voice of Loki in the same episode. Christopher Heyerdahl, who played Pallan in "Revisions", would later play the recurring characters of Halling and the Wraith 'Todd' on Stargate Atlantis. Peter LaCroix previously played the Ashrak in "In the Line of Duty".

Kavan Smith, who appeared in "Enemy Mine" as Major Lorne would later reprise this role as a recurring character in Stargate Atlantis. In "Space Race", Alex Zahara takes on the role of Warrick, who was played by Dion Johnstone in "Forsaken". This marks Zahara's sixth different character that he has played on Stargate, usually under make-up. It's also the second week in a row that someone else has taken over a role originally played by Dion Johnstone. G. Patrick Currie, who plays Eamon in this episode, took over Johnstone's role as Chaka in the previous weeks. Patrick Currie (Eamon) previously played Fifth in season six's "Unnatural Selection". The weapon Carter uses in "Avenger 2.0" (referred to as the Carter Special) was created as the show could not use P90s as the Iraq War made getting hold of the cartridges difficult.

"Chimera" was alternatively entitled Black Widow Carter. In the episode, Carter mentions how all of her boyfriends in the past are dead, which is accurate. David DeLuise appeared as the fourth DeLuise on Stargate – Dom, Michael, and Peter have all appeared in the past. At one point, Carter hums the Stargate SG-1 theme tune in the elevator in the episode, breaking the Fourth wall. Amanda Tapping actually wanted to hum the MacGyver theme but couldn't remember the melody. Carter also says that Colorado Springs has no zoo, when it in fact does, the Cheyenne Mountain Zoo. Producer Joseph Mallozzi said that this was supposed to be a subtle hint that Carter spends too much time at work to notice what her city has to offer. At the beginning of the episode, there is a shot of what should be the University of Chicago, in fact the shot is of the University of Chicago Lab School, a lower school affiliate. "Heroes, Part 2" was the 150th episode of Stargate SG-1 to be aired. Adam Baldwin, who plays Colonel Dave Dixon, commander of SG-13, in this episode, is well known among sci-fi fans for playing Jayne Cobb in the cult hit Firefly and its big-screen adaptation Serenity and also Marcus Hamilton in Angel. Mitchell Kosterman previously played a different character, Special Agent James Hamner, in "Seth". "Heroes" also marks the first appearance of Agent Richard Woolsey (Robert Picardo) on the series. Picardo is most well known for playing the holographic Doctor on Star Trek: Voyager. Another veteran of Star Trek, Jolene Blalock—who played T'Pol from Star Trek: Enterprise—appears in "Birthright".

"Resurrection" is the first SG-1 episode directed by Amanda Tapping. It is also the only SG-1 episode to have both been written by an actor on the show (Michael Shanks) and to be directed by one as well. The White House interior set in "Inauguration" and "Lost City" is the same one used in X-Men 2. Along with "Disclosure", "Inauguration" is one of only two episodes where none of the regular characters except General Hammond are featured. This is the only season of Stargate SG-1 to air on the Sci-Fi Channel to feature the original Showtime cast.

== Release ==
For the episode "Lifeboat", Michael Shanks won a Leo Award in the category "Dramatic Series: Best Lead Performance – Male", and Teryl Rothery was nominated for a Leo Award in the category "Dramatic Series: Best Supporting Performance – Female". "Enemy Mine" won a Leo Award in the category "Dramatic Series: Best Make-Up". For the episode "Grace", Amanda Tapping won a Leo Award in the category "Dramatic Series: Best Lead Performance – Female". "Heroes" was nominated for a Hugo Award in the category Best Dramatic Presentation – Short Form. For "Heroes, Part 2", Andy Mikita was nominated for a Leo Award in the category "Dramatic Series: Best Direction", and Don S. Davis was nominated for a Leo Award in the category "Dramatic Series: Best Supporting Performance – Male". "Lost City, Part 2" was nominated for an Emmy Award in the category Outstanding Special Visual Effects for a Series and for a Gemini Award in the category Best Visual Effects.

=== Cultural references ===
In "Avenger 2.0", Dr. Felger (Patrick McKenna), who first appeared in Season 6's "The Other Guys", prominently packs a roll of duct tape during his preparations for going offworld. This is a reference to The Red Green Show, which featured Patrick McKenna in a regular role.

== Main cast ==
- Richard Dean Anderson as Colonel Jack O'Neill
- Amanda Tapping as Major Samantha Carter
- Christopher Judge as Teal'c
- Don S. Davis as Major General George Hammond
- Michael Shanks as Dr. Daniel Jackson

== Episodes ==
Episodes in bold are continuous episodes, where the story spans over 2 or more episodes.

No. overall	No. in season	Title	Directed by	Written by	Original release date
133	1	"**Fallen**"	Martin Wood	Robert C. Cooper	June 13, 2003
Daniel is found living on Vis Uban ("place of great power", P4T-3G6), a planet where the Ancients began building their greatest city when they were struck by a plague. Although Daniel has total amnesia, he helps SG-1 destroy Anubis' superweapon.
134	2	"**Homecoming**"	Martin Wood	Joseph Mallozzi & Paul Mullie	June 13, 2003
With knowledge of naquadria, Anubis attacks Kelowna, and SG-1 must come up with a plan to save them. Meanwhile, on Anubis's ship, Daniel attempts to rescue Jonas.
135	3	"Fragile Balance"	Peter DeLuise	Story by : Peter DeLuise & Michael Greenburg; Teleplay by : Damian Kindler	June 20, 2003
O'Neill wakes up one morning to find himself 30 years younger, much to the annoyance of the Colonel. It is soon learned that the same process that caused him to become younger is also causing him to die. The rest of SG-1 discovers that the young O'Neill is a clone and an Asgard is responsible.
136	4	"Orpheus"	Peter DeLuise	Peter DeLuise	June 27, 2003
Teal'c is shot by a Jaffa as they retreat through the gate and his self-confidence is greatly wounded. Meanwhile, Daniel remembers that Rya'c and Bra'tac are held prisoner on the planet Erebus, where Jaffa prisoners of war must build Ha'tak ships. Teal'c must regain his confidence if they are to be saved.
137	5	"Revisions"	Martin Wood	Joseph Mallozzi & Paul Mullie	July 11, 2003
Mahg Mar (P3X-289) has a toxic atmosphere but there is a forcefield dome protecting an idyllic village. That is, idyllic except for the fact that its inhabitants are disappearing one by one, without noticing it themselves.
138	6	"Lifeboat"	Peter DeLuise	Brad Wright	July 18, 2003
While exploring P2A-347, SG-1 encounters the crashed alien space ship Stromos containing a plethora of cryogenic pods. The team separates, and Daniel's mind becomes host to many different minds of the ship's crew. When SG-1 investigates the alien ship to find a way to cure Daniel, they discover that the minds of the passengers from the planet Talthus are being saved in the ship's computer.
139	7	"Enemy Mine"	Peter DeLuise	Peter DeLuise	July 25, 2003
SGC have found a planet with rich deposits of naquadah, but the local population of Unas do not welcome the mining team. Daniel enlists his Unas friend Chaka to negotiate an agreement.
140	8	"Space Race"	Andy Mikita	Damian Kindler	August 1, 2003
Carter helps the Serrakin Warrick (season 6's "Forsaken") to enter his spaceship in a dangerous race on his planet Hebridan (P4X-131). The prize is a lucrative contract. Carter and Warrick must overcome sabotage caused by one of the participants.
141	9	"Avenger 2.0"	Martin Wood	Joseph Mallozzi & Paul Mullie	August 8, 2003
Felger ("The Other Guys") is about to be fired, and is desperate to persuade General Hammond to give him another chance. He invents a computer virus able to deactivate a Stargate, and targets one of Baal's principal naquadah mining sites on P5S-117 to test out the virus. However, the virus spreads on its own and the entire network is shut down.
142	10	"Birthright"	Peter F. Woeste	Christopher Judge	August 15, 2003
SG-1 meet a group of all female Jaffa from a planet named Hak'tyl (meaning "liberation"), who have set up their own rebel base. They were rebels against the Goa'uld Moloc who forced his Jaffa to sacrifice their female babies in fire; many of these female Jaffa were rescued as infants by their leader Ishta (Jolene Blalock).
143	11	"**Evolution**"	Peter DeLuise	Story by : Damian Kindler & Michael Shanks; Teleplay by : Damian Kindler	August 22, 2003
144	12	"**Evolution**"	Peter DeLuise	Story by : Damian Kindler & Peter DeLuise; Teleplay by : Peter DeLuise	December 15, 2003 (Sky One); January 9, 2004 (Sci Fi)
Part 1: Teal'c and Bra'tac are attacked by a black armoured warrior, impervious to all known weapons, who is found to be an advanced Goa'uld warrior created by Anubis. Daniel visits Honduras to find a hidden artifact which may hold the key to defeating them. Part 2: O'Neill goes to Honduras to rescue Daniel Jackson. In the meantime, Carter, Jacob/Selmak and Teal'c must destroy the facility on the planet Tartarus, where Anubis is creating legions of the new warriors, using a Goa'uld queen to spawn new symbiotes.
145	13	"Grace"	Peter F. Woeste	Damian Kindler	January 6, 2004 (Sky One); January 16, 2004 (Sci Fi)
Carter is on the Prometheus while the ship is on its way to Earth, and is attacked from a spaceship of a type they have never seen before. They try to escape by hiding in a nebula, but all the crew except Carter disappear.
146	14	"Fallout"	Martin Wood	Story by : Corin Nemec; Teleplay by : Joseph Mallozzi & Paul Mullie	January 13, 2004 (Sky One); January 23, 2004 (Sci Fi)
Jonas Quinn returns to Earth from Kelowna to enlist the SGC's help. He informs them that naquadria was created in a catalytic reaction and the process is ongoing on Kelowna. If the reaction goes deep enough, heat and pressure will destabilize the naquadria, and it will blow the planet apart. Meanwhile, Jonas has been working with the brilliant young scientist Kianna, and have a mutual romantic attraction, but she is not what she seems.
147	15	"Chimera"	William Waring	Story by : Robert C. Cooper; Teleplay by : Damian Kindler	January 20, 2004 (Sky One); January 30, 2004 (Sci Fi)
Osiris has been visiting Daniel at night and using a mind control device to try to find the Lost City of the Ancients. SG-1 decide to attempt to capture her. However, Carter's new boyfriend Pete might get in the way.
148	16	"Death Knell"	Peter DeLuise	Peter DeLuise	January 27, 2004 (Sky One); February 6, 2004 (Sci Fi)
The Alpha Site, where a prototype weapon to fight Anubis's supersoldier drones is being created, is attacked by a drone. Carter escapes but she is on her own and the drone is hunting her.
149	17	"**Heroes**"	Andy Mikita	Robert C. Cooper	February 3, 2004 (Sky One); February 13, 2004 (Sci Fi)
150	18	"**Heroes**"	Andy Mikita	Robert C. Cooper	February 10, 2004 (Sky One); February 20, 2004 (Sci Fi)
Part 1: A film crew arrive at SGC to make a documentary but find their welcome less than enthusiastic. Part 2: While the film crew continues to make their documentary at SGC, help is sent to rescue an SG member who is unable to get to the gate. However, on the mission, a member of the SGC is killed.
151	19	"Resurrection"	Amanda Tapping	Michael Shanks	February 17, 2004 (Sky One); February 27, 2004 (Sci Fi)
SGC find the base of a rogue NID operation which has been attempting to mix the DNA of humans and Goa'uld, but all the agents except one have been killed.
152	20	"Inauguration"	Peter F. Woeste	Teleplay by : Joseph Mallozzi & Paul Mullie; Excerpts written by : Robert C. Cooper, Peter DeLuise, Damian Kindler, Joseph Mallozzi, Paul Mullie, Katharyn Powers, David Rich, Michael Shanks, Ron Wilkerson and Brad Wright	February 24, 2004 (Sky One); March 5, 2004 (Sci Fi)
A new President has been elected and must be briefed on the Stargate Program. However, as usual, the new Vice President Kinsey has his own agenda.
153	21	"**Lost City**"	Martin Wood	Brad Wright & Robert C. Cooper	March 2, 2004 (Sky One); March 12, 2004 (Sci Fi)
154	22	"**Lost City**"	Martin Wood	Brad Wright & Robert C. Cooper	March 9, 2004 (Sky One); March 19, 2004 (Sci Fi)
Part 1: The SGC locates a Repository of Knowledge on P3X-439 and when Anubis attacks, O'Neill downloads their knowledge into his brain again. Finally, Bra'tac warns SG-1 that Anubis plans an attack on Earth. Part 2: Hammond is replaced by Dr. Elizabeth Weir. As Anubis' fleet arrives, SG-1 flies to Proclarush Taonas, a planet with an Ancient outpost and a ZPM. There, SG-1 learns that what they are searching for has been back on Earth the whole time. O'Neill is able to destroy Anubis's fleet using an Ancient weapon buried beneath Antarctica, but the aftermath of the battle reveals a grim situation.
