= Evan Lorne =

Fictional character from the Stargate universe

- Kavan Smith as Evan Lorne in a screencap taken from the Stargate Atlantis Season 4 episode, "Doppelganger".
- First appearance: "Enemy Mine"
- Last appearance: "Enemy at the Gate"
- Created by: Peter DeLuise
- Portrayed by: Kavan Smith

In-universe information
- Species: Human
- Occupation: United States Air Force; Major
- Family: mother, sister and two nephews
- Nationality: American

Major Evan Lorne, USAF is a fictional character in the 2004 Canadian–American Sci-Fi Channel television series Stargate SG-1 and Stargate Atlantis, two military science fiction shows about military teams exploring the galaxy via a network of alien transportation devices. Played by Kavan Smith, Evan Lorne was first introduced as a recurring character in the seventh season of Stargate SG-1, holding the military rank of Major in the United States Air Force. He joins the Atlantis expedition after "The Siege" as one of the personnel on the Daedalus class battlecruiser.

Lorne was a recurring character in seasons seven and ten in Stargate SG-1 and seasons two through five in Stargate Atlantis. Smith was originally supposed to play another character in Stargate Atlantis, but the producers eventually decided to keep Lorne, since he was popular with the fans according to Smith himself. He appears in a total of 29 episodes.

== Character arc ==
Lorne first appears in Stargate SG-1 episode "Enemy Mine". Lorne reappears as a part of the new personnel sent after the Wraith siege by the Daedalus and serves as Atlantis' military second-in-command under Lieutenant Colonel John Sheppard. In "Runner", he assists Sheppard, Teyla Emmagan, and Rodney McKay in the search for Aiden Ford. Lorne possesses the ATA gene, but it has never been revealed whether his gene is natural or artificial. He is seen piloting a Puddle Jumper in several episodes including "Condemned" and "The Hive".

Lorne is one of the Atlantis Expedition members in "This Mortal Coil" that the Replicators take the form of, but they are all killed by Oberoth. In an alternate timeline shown in the episode "The Last Man", Lorne is a major general and appears to be in command of the Stargate Command (SGC). Lorne also appears as the team leader of the SG-1 unit in an alternate universe in the SG-1 season 10 episode "The Road Not Taken".

In "Doppelganger", Lorne threatens Sheppard while sleepwalking, believing him to be a Replicator. Lorne is stunned by Ronon Dex, and while being questioned by Dr. Kate Heightmeyer says that he "hadn't had a sleepwalking incident since he was ten." Lorne's mother, an art teacher, taught him how to paint on weekends when he was growing up, and Lorne rekindles this muse during his stay on Atlantis. In "Tabula Rasa", Lorne, while being semiamnesiac, takes a severe overdose of a delaying medicine that is supposed to hold back the illness. This causes him (and all of his team) to become paranoid, aggressive and confused and they resort to shooting with stunners everyone they see even if they are not affected by the sickness. Eventually, though, a picture of Sheppard convinced him to assist Ronon treat the sick. He later apologised to Sheppard. Originally from San Francisco, California, Lorne also has a sister who has two young boys. He loves ice cream.

== Conceptual history ==
The character was introduced in the Stargate SG-1 episode "Enemy Mine". Kavan Smith had formed a close relationship with director Peter DeLuise before being cast. When the development of the episode was finished, there were no plans of expanding Lorne's role in the franchise. Smith himself felt the part would not "necessarily" lead anywhere big. Sometime after shooting "Enemy Mine", the producers wanted to talk to Smith about the possibility of having him return to the spin off series, Stargate Atlantis. After the talk, Smith auditioned for a part, he won and received a different character. According to Smith, this character was more of a "military guy", but the producers eventually decided to give Smith back his old character, Lorne.

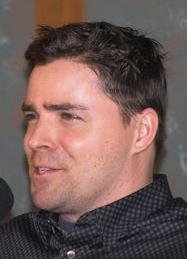
Portraying actor, Smith at Stargate convention.

When talking about season two of Stargate Atlantis, staff writer, Martin Gero said Lorne had become the most notable recurring character of the series. In an interview with Smith, it was revealed that Lorne's first name was decided to be "Evan", later confirmed by executive producer, Joseph Mallozzi. While fans on the other hand, have given him the first name, Marcus (or, alternately, Nick), the producers or writers have not responded to this. In the episode "Spoils of War", a character was going to call him "Uncle Evan", this scene was cut off, because of time constraints.

At first, plot information about the episode, "Coup D'etat" was a bit scarce. Many fans speculated that they were going to kill Lorne off the show. Smith went and had a brief talk with the writing staff, responding to his worries that it was a part of a "cliffhanger". According to Smith, the only reason for making Lorne a recurring character was the positive feedback from fans. "Sunday" became the first episode to reveal information about Lorne's backstory. Smith described Lorne as "that sort of faithful, loyal guy that everybody kind of knows," and representing a "steady constant." On his own weblog, Joseph Mallozzi said that Lorne as a character would become more active during season 5.

== Reception ==
Cynthia from Sci Fi Universe commented that Kavan Smith played a character who had the "same name" as the character he originally portrayed in Stargate SG-1, but was "not really the same guy". Concluding her review saying she reacted positive towards the evolution of the character. When talking about science fiction fandom, Smith said that he was "shocked" about the fan response to his character, further stating that this could only be possible in a science fiction television series. In the interview, Smith said that his "character seems to be developing ... I feel like his career is sort of moving ahead." In an interview, Smith said he had evolved a strong fanbase, which started with his more obscure earlier work and has since followed him throughout his career. Because of the strong fan response, Smith has started to attend various Stargate conventions.
