= The Lost Treasure of the Grand Canyon =

2008 Canadian television film

- Written by: Clay Carmouche
- Directed by: Farhad Mann
- Starring: Shannen Doherty; Michael Shanks; JR Bourne
- Music by: Michael Neilson
- Countries of origin: Canada; United States
- Original language: English

Production
- Producer: Harvey Kahn
- Editor: Nicole Ratcliffe
- Running time: 90 minutes
- Production companies: Front Street Pictures; Starz Media

Original release
- Network: Syfy
- Release: December 20, 2008

The Lost Treasure of the Grand Canyon is a 2008 adventure sci-fi movie set in the Grand Canyon, directed by Farhad Mann. The movie was due to be released in late November 2008 but the date was pushed back to December 20, 2008, due to unfinished filming. The film was released on DVD on May 26, 2009.

== Plot ==
In the late 19th century, a team of Smithsonian researchers stumbled across a lost walled Aztec city guarded by a "great flying serpent of death." As days turn to weeks, Susan Jordan, the daughter of the professor leading the expedition, assembles a team to rescue her father and his colleagues from the clutches of the ancient Aztec warriors and their horrible serpent god.

== Cast ==
- Michael Shanks as Jacob Thain
- Shannen Doherty as Susan Jordan
- JR Bourne as Marco Langford
- Toby Berner as Steward Dunbar
- Heather Doerksen as Hildy Wainwright
- Duncan Fraser as Dr. Samuel Jordon
- Peter New as Isaac Preston

== Production ==
The production for this film began in February 2008. Filming began on April 26, 2008, and ended on May 14, 2008, a 19-day stretch, in Kamloops, British Columbia and Thompson-Nicola Region, British Columbia.
