= Alberni Street =

Road in Vancouver, Canada

- Alberni District
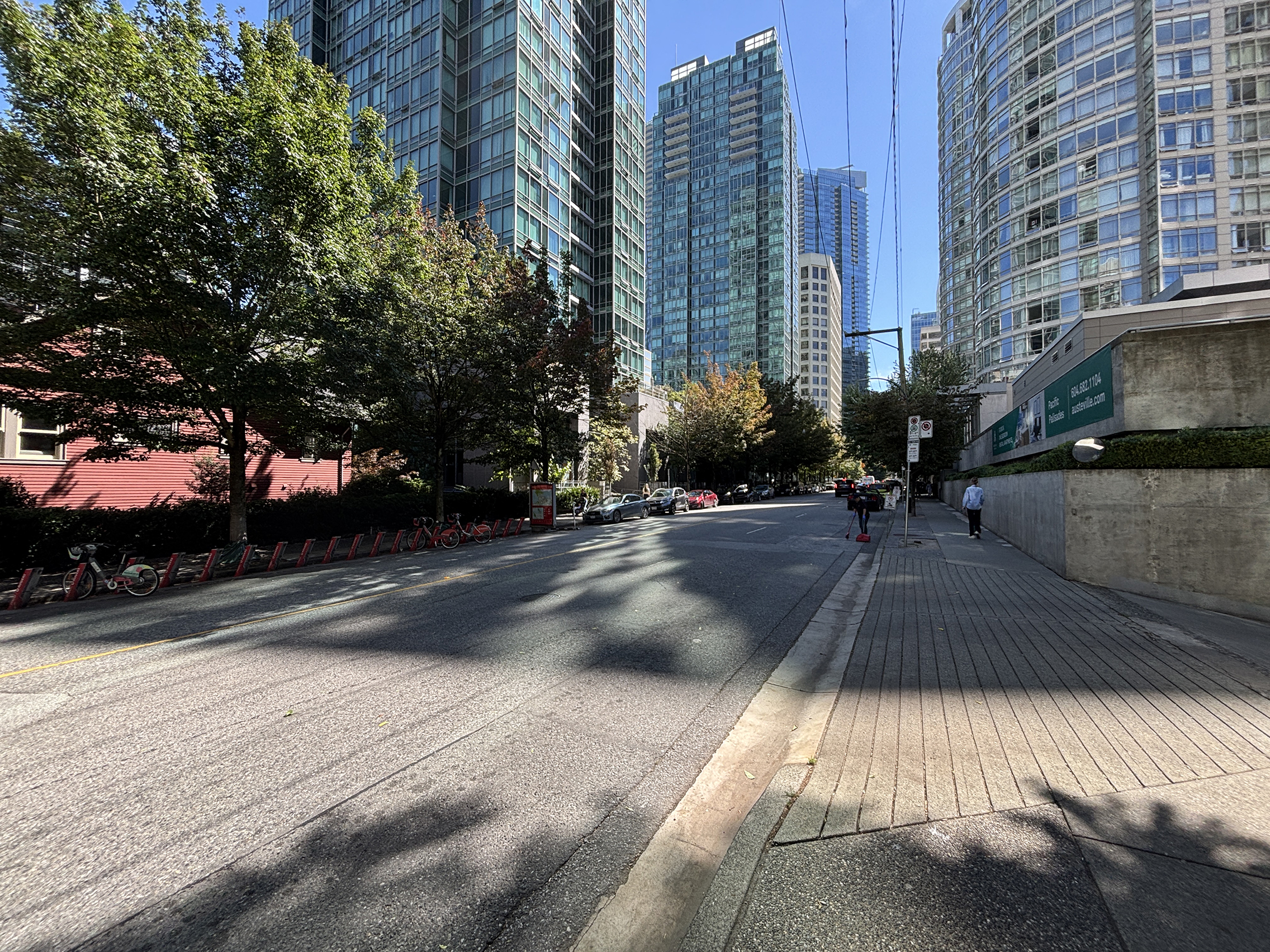
- Alberni Street in Downtown Vancouver (2025)
- Type: Street
- Location: Central Business District
- Nearest metro station: Burrard Station
- NE end: Burrard Street
- SW end: Davie Street

Other
- Known for: Vancouver Luxury Zone, Little Ginza
- Website: http://www.downtownalberni.com/

Alberni Street is a road in Downtown Vancouver that has been called "Vancouver’s version of Rodeo Drive". In the 2010s, the street transformed into a centre for fine restaurants and high-end luxury retail stores. Beginning with a flagship store for De Beers diamonds that opened in 2013, Alberni Street and its environs are now home to the majority of luxury brands in Vancouver, including Burberry, Escada, Tiffany & Co., Hermès, Louis Vuitton, Dior, Gucci and Ferragamo. Several high-rise condominium buildings have been constructed along the street as well.

Alberni Street is especially popular with wealthy tourists from Asia who are drawn to the street while staying at nearby luxury hotels such as the Hotel Vancouver, the Sutton Place Hotel, the Paradox Hotel Vancouver and the Shangri-La Hotel.
