= Samantha Carter =

Fictional character in the Stargate universe

Colonel Samantha Carter
- Amanda Tapping as Colonel Samantha Carter in a promotional photo for Stargate Atlantis Season 4.
- First appearance: "Children of the Gods" (SG-1)
- Last appearance: "Incursion" (Universe)
- Portrayed by: Amanda Tapping; Christine Kennedy (Young Sam)

In-universe information
- Species: Human
- Occupation: United States Air Force; Captain; Major; Lieutenant colonel Colonel
- Family: Jacob Carter (father, deceased); Mark (brother); Irving (uncle); Unnamed niece Unnamed nephew
- Nationality: American
- Accolades: Airman's Medal; Meritorious Service Medal; Air Force Commendation Medal; Air Force Achievement Medal

Colonel Samantha "Sam" Carter, USAF, is a fictional character in the Canadian–American military science fiction Stargate franchise. Played by Amanda Tapping, she appears in all three shows in the franchise: Stargate SG-1, Stargate Atlantis, and Stargate Universe. She was a main character in all ten seasons of Stargate SG-1 (1997–2007). Following a recurring role in Stargate Atlantis for three seasons (2004–07), Carter became a main character in Season 4 of Atlantis (2007–08), and also appeared in the 2008 direct-to-DVD SG-1 films Stargate: The Ark of Truth and Stargate: Continuum. Amanda Tapping accepted a starring role in Sanctuary and appears in only the first and last episodes in Season 5 of Atlantis (2008–09). Carter also appears in two episodes of Season 1 of Stargate Universe.

Captain Samantha Carter first appears in "Children of the Gods", the pilot episode of Stargate SG-1, as a United States Air Force captain who joined the fictional SG-1 team under the command of Colonel Jack O'Neill. After being promoted to major in Season 3, Carter remains O'Neill's second-in-command until her promotion to lieutenant colonel early in Season 8, at which point she assumes command of the SG-1 team and O'Neill is promoted to brigadier general in order to lead Stargate Command. Between Seasons 8 and 9 of SG-1, following the defeat of the Replicators and downfall of the Goa'uld system lords, she accepts a position as Head of the Stargate Research and Development Program, based in Nevada. She is engaged in deep-space research when the Ori emerge. Upon her return to Earth, she is reassigned to SG-1, now under the command of Lieutenant Colonel Cameron Mitchell. Following the defeat of the Ori in Stargate: The Ark of Truth, Carter is promoted to full colonel and appointed as commander of the Atlantis expedition early in Season 4 of Atlantis. Carter is later given command of the Daedalus-class ship, the George Hammond.

Unofficially in the online game Stargate: Resistance, it is implied by visual screenshots showing a general's office with her name on the desk label that she eventually succeeds Major General Hank Landry as commander of the SGC, implying an offscreen (non-canonical) promotion to brigadier general.

Overall, Carter is the character with the most appearances across the Stargate franchise, though ranking as second-most — behind Teal'c — in the series Stargate SG-1.

== Role in Stargate ==
=== Character arc in Stargate SG-1 ===
Before the present-time events of Stargate SG-1, Samantha Carter worked at the Pentagon for several years, trying to get the Stargate operational. She has a Ph.D. in theoretical astrophysics and "logged over 100 hours in enemy airspace" during the Gulf War. She is the daughter of Major General Jacob Carter, and has a brother named Mark. Her mother died in a car accident when she was a teenager.

Holding the rank of captain, Samantha Carter joins the SG-1 team in the pilot episode, "Children of the Gods". She comes under the temporary control of the Tok'ra Jolinar in season 2 and retains many of her memories, leading to an alliance with the Tok'ra against the Goa'uld. Carter's brief merging with Jolinar also assists her in detecting a Goa'uld presence and using certain Goa'uld technology. Carter is promoted to the rank of major early in season 3. When an advanced lie detector shows they are concealing something in early season 4, it forces Carter and her superior officer, Colonel Jack O'Neill, to admit that they care for one another "a lot more than [they're] supposed to". In Exodus (season 4), Carter uses a stargate to destroy a star by dialing the gate on P3W-451, the planet being consumed by a black hole (originally discovered in A Matter of Time), and launching the active stargate into the nearby star; the resulting imbalance in mass causes the star to go supernova and destroy Apophis's fleet.

Trapped on board the Earth ship Prometheus in season 7's "Grace", Carter realizes that her feelings for O'Neill stop her from exploring other romances. Two episodes later in Chimera, Carter begins dating her brother's friend Pete Shanahan, but Pete disrespects her privacy and the confidential nature of her work. Pete gaslights her and stalks her until she is forced to disclose her job to him. In the season 8 premiere, "New Order", Carter gets captured by a humanoid Replicator named Fifth she had first encountered in season 6's "Unnatural Selection". Fifth eventually releases her, but keeps a replicator copy of her, known commonly as 'RepliCarter'. Upon O'Neill's promotion to brigadier general in the same episode, he promotes her to lieutenant colonel. Carter assumes command of the SG-1 team, which includes the de-ascended Daniel Jackson, the alien Teal'c, and herself. Shortly after the death of her father in late season 8, Carter breaks up with Pete and goes fishing with Jack, Daniel, and Teal'c to celebrate the defeat of the System Lords.

Season 9 reveals that Carter left SG-1 to work at Area 51 after the collapse of the Goa'uld power structure. After Lieutenant Colonel Cameron Mitchell assumes command of SG-1, General O'Neill orders Carter to assist SG-1 on a mission concerning the new Ori threat. Carter officially rejoins SG-1 in the season 9 episode "Ex Deus Machina". Samantha Carter appears in the 2008 direct-to-DVD films Stargate: The Ark of Truth and Stargate: Continuum.

=== Character arc in Stargate Atlantis ===
Lieutenant Colonel Carter makes her first appearance in Stargate Atlantis at the end of its first season (airing in parallel to season 8 of Stargate SG-1), receiving a very brief data transmission from the Atlantis expedition to Earth. The Atlantis character Dr. Rodney McKay (David Hewlett) has a hallucination of Carter which enables him to survive while trapped in a sinking Puddle Jumper in season 2. Lieutenant Colonel Carter approaches McKay's sister Jeannie Miller with an offer to work for Stargate Command in season 3. At an unknown point after the end of the Ori conflict in Stargate SG-1, Carter is promoted to a "full bird" colonel and is transferred to the Midway space station to oversee the final stages of completion. The IOA appoints Carter as the new commander of the Atlantis expedition early in season 4 of Atlantis.

Carter finds the Atlantis command experience quite relaxed in terms of military protocol, but enjoys it nonetheless ("Midway"). True to her SG-1 heritage, she conducts herself bravely by actively taking part in missions ("Reunion", "Trio") and protecting and defending those under her command ("Be All My Sins Remember'd", "Search and Rescue"). Carter even builds a more amicable relationship with Dr. Rodney McKay, having put their past tensions aside, and clearly respects Lt. Colonel Sheppard's command and past accomplishments in the Pegasus Galaxy.

Carter is recalled to Earth at the end of the first episode of season five for a Tok'ra extraction ceremony concerning the final Ba'al clone (a ceremony witnessed in Stargate: Continuum), followed by an exhaustive first-year command review by the International Oversight Advisory (IOA). Upon arrival, however, Richard Woolsey informs her that the IOA has removed her from command, and that he will be replacing her. As of "Enemy at the Gate", she is the temporary SGC base commander while General Hank Landry is heading a task force based in Washington. After this assignment she is to be made commander of the new Daedalus Class (BC-304) battlecruiser, formerly known as the Phoenix, now named the George Hammond in memory of General George Hammond.

=== Stargate Universe ===
Carter is in command of the George Hammond when it ferries personnel from Earth to Icarus Base to witness the latest attempt to dial the ninth chevron. The Hammond attempts to fight off the assault on the base by a fleet of Goa'uld ships that Carter presumes belong to the Lucian Alliance. Although they are unsuccessful in preventing the destruction of the base, they are able to rescue most of the survivors stranded outside, including Colonel David Telford, who was to command the expedition to Destiny. She also appears later in season 1 where she is the officer in charge of the assault on the Lucian Alliance base.

=== Relationships ===
Over the course of the two shows, a number of men are in love with, infatuated with, or attracted to, Carter. This includes Jack O'Neill, the Tok'ra Martouf, Dr. Rodney McKay, Fifth, Orlin, Agent Malcolm Barrett, Narim, Pete Shanahan, Dr. Jay Felger, her former fiancé Jonas Hanson, and Joseph Faxon (her duplicitous husband of a possible future in Season 4, episode 16, "2010"). Many of these individuals have (presumably) since died, including: Martouf (and symbiote Lantash); Fifth; Narim; Hanson; and two alternate versions of Jack O'Neill. This has led many of the cast and crew of Stargate SG-1 to humorously nickname her character Samantha "the Black Widow" Carter.

Asked why the series never confirmed a relationship between Carter and O'Neill, producer Joseph Mallozzi stated in his blog,

The Sam/Jack relationship was fraught with complications, given that he was her commanding officer. Pursuing any sort of relationship would have been inappropriate for both and would only have really been possible late in the series after Jack's retirement. [...] Jack and Sam could have gotten together after Jack's retirement, but it was never made canon because, quite frankly, it wasn't my call. Still, despite the lack of official confirmation, it was only natural that they should get together after the events of Threads and, in my mind, they have been together ever since. An attempt to suggest as much in [Stargate Atlantis'] season 4's Trio, unfortunately, ended up on the cutting room floor when the episode ran long.

In season 9, episode 7, Sam catches up with Malcolm Barrett and tells him that she and Pete had broken up. He asks if she is single, and she responds, "not exactly."

When Carter joins the Atlantis expedition as commanding officer, a framed photo of O'Neill is seen on top of a box of her personal effects. A scene was cut from the Stargate Atlantis season 4 episode "Trio" in which Carter and Dr. Jennifer Keller discuss their love lives. When asked by Keller if she's seeing anyone, Carter initially avoids the question before admitting that "it's complicated" and that the man in question is in Washington D.C. but is going to retire soon. In episode 12, season 10, Samantha is shot and reveals to Mitchell that she has a file on her laptop with letters to people who she cares for in case she dies. The password is 'fishing,' an apparent reference to O'Neill.

Carmen Argenziano, the actor who plays Carter's father Jacob Carter, was asked in an interview who would be a good match for his on-screen daughter. He said:

I like Daniel Jackson. I felt that Daniel would have been the right choice because Daniel is well-educated, is intelligent, gentlemanly and he was everything that I envisioned that my daughter would end up with.

=== SG-1 leadership ===
Carter first assumes command of SG-1 in SG-1's season 2 episode "Spirits" when Jack O'Neill is in the infirmary injured. Carter takes over command from O'Neill as SG-1 leader at the end of season 7. Hammond had instructed Carter to relieve O'Neill of duty had she deemed him too unstable while under the influence of the Repository of the Ancients. O'Neill subsequently "quits" to avoid making Carter feel guilty. When Amanda Tapping was on maternity leave at the beginning of season 9, Cameron Mitchell was introduced as the leader of SG-1 who would bring the team back together. Following negative fan reactions to Carter's cancelled leadership within the team, Ben Browder noted the production difficulties that came with Amanda Tapping's maternity leave, and pointed out that new leaders are brought in routinely into units of the military. Tapping admitted to also have been "kind of put off" upon learning that someone else would lead SG-1, hoping that the producers would make SG-1 more of an ensemble team in season 10 by removing the patriarchal line of command. The writers eventually decided after an animated discussion during season 9 that Mitchell and Carter would co-command the team, although they left Mitchell in the official leadership position. Tapping considered the question of leadership in season 10 irrelevant; Mitchell cannot give orders to his team since he and Carter hold the same military rank, and Daniel and Teal'c are not members of the United States military.

== Conceptual history ==
Tapping in costume on location in the Arctic for Stargate: Continuum

During the casting process of Stargate SG-1, the producers were looking for an actress who could portray a strong woman whom the audience would accept as a soldier. The character should have had combat training and have been in wars, but should also be a brilliant scientist and a beautiful woman. Amanda Tapping at first assumed that the show would put more emphasis on intellect, but found that it was an action-adventure scifi show where the characters often got physical. Tapping described Carter as a cross between Jack O'Neill and Daniel Jackson, and the conflict of her character whether to go the scientific route or with military protocol.

Amanda Tapping was part of the Stargate SG-1 main cast for all of the show's ten seasons. She did not appear in season 6's "Disclosure" or season 7's "Inauguration" except in clips from previous episodes and was completely absent from season 8's "Prometheus Unbound" and the season nine episodes "Avalon (Part 2)", "Origin", "The Ties That Bind" and "The Powers That Be" due to Tapping's maternity leave (she appeared briefly in "Avalon (Part 1)" to explain her absence); and season ten's "Bad Guys".

While Amanda Tapping was part of the main cast of Stargate SG-1, she made several cameo appearances in the first three seasons of Stargate Atlantis. Amanda Tapping became a member of the Atlantis main cast for 14 episodes of Season 4. She did not appear in "Travelers", "Missing", "Miller's Crossing", "This Mortal Coil", "Spoils of War" and "Harmony".

Tapping sat down with Robert C. Cooper at the beginning of Stargate SG-1's season 7 to discuss Carter's struggle with her demons and her life choices in regards to work and family. The events of "Grace" are left open for interpretation, both for the audience and the actors. Grace could be Sam's child within, her hopes and dreams for having a child, the child Sam left behind when she started her career as an astrophysicist, or Carter's potential future with a family. "Chimera" is an offshoot of what happened in "Grace", and the writers were trying to "dispel the black widow curse that Carter has, and also to open her up for more experiences and to flesh her out just a little bit more as a human being". Tapping felt out of her element doing these two episodes, as the flirty side of the character had not really been explored in the show until then. Also, Pete Shanahan does not die, which confuses Carter. According to Tapping, Carter is oblivious what lengths Shanahan is going (stalking, background checks) to find out more about her classified life, although the character is finally free to talk about her life at the end of episode.

Several fans refused to watch the episode "Chimera" because Carter was getting involved with someone other than who they wanted her to be involved with. Tapping received letters of fans who said that Carter's integrity "is completely out the window, and, 'What the hell [were you] thinking.'" According to Tapping, Carter "harbors great depth of feeling for Colonel O'Neill, but because nothing can ever happen ... He's the one who let her go. He says, 'I'm a safe bet. You know you can't have me so you're just protecting your heart by, you know, hanging your hat on someone you can't have. So, let me go,' is essentially what's said at the end of "Grace"". Tapping said,

The whole episode is her sort of rethinking her life and rethinking her choices, and I don't think that she's lost integrity. I don't think that her feelings for O'Neill are any less. I think she's just placed them in a different box, if you will. It was weird, I have to say, for her to hand her heart over to somebody else. But it's baby steps for her, and this is all new for her. And I think it's ultimately O'Neill who says, 'You have to move on.' And it's her father, too, who says, you know, 'Don't give up your chance of love. You know, I would live my whole life over again even knowing that your mother's gonna die, I would do all that again.' So it's her opening up her heart as opposed to actually – it's been closed this whole time because she's, you know, been protecting it with thoughts of O'Neill, who she knows she can't have, so it opens her up.

Working around Richard Dean Anderson's reduced schedule was a challenge for Tapping. Nevertheless, Tapping, Michael Shanks and Christopher Judge knew going into season 7 that this allowed for their characters to be fleshed out a bit more and to have a bit more screen time. She did not think the dynamics or the chemistry of the team had suffered.

Unlike O'Neill and Jackson, Carter did not appear in the series premiere of Atlantis. This was probably to do with the legalities of her being a character specifically created for Stargate SG-1. Tapping considered the elevator scene with Cassandra in season 1's "Singularity" to be one of the scenes to best fully capture Carter.

== Reception ==
For her portrayal of Samantha Carter, Amanda Tapping was nominated for a 2000 Leo Award in the category "Dramatic Series: Best Lead Performance – Female" for the episode "Point of View", and won the Leo for "Ascension" in 2003, for "Grace" in 2004, and for "Threads" in 2005. Tapping was nominated for a Saturn Award in the category "Best Supporting Actress on Television" in 1999, 2000, 2001, 2002, 2003 and 2004. Tapping was nominated for a 2001 Gemini Award in the category "Best Performance by an Actress in a Continuing Leading Dramatic Role". In 2008 Amanda Tapping was nominated for a Constellation Award nomination in the category "Outstanding Canadian Contribution to Science Fiction Film or Television in 2008".

Variety reviewed the pilot episode "Children of the Gods", where he stated that Tapping's character was "Pushy" and her acting was "Wooden". Tory Ireland Mell, reviewer from IGN said that Carter's season four presence on Stargate Atlantis was "underused" and a "slap in the face" to her character. In 2008, Amanda Tapping started to produce her own web series entitled Sanctuary with Damian Kindler and Martin Wood among others. Many reviewers have felt that Tapping accepted the role of Doctor Helen Magnus to make a name of herself outside the Stargate universe as Samantha Carter. AOL named her one of the 100 Most Memorable Female TV Characters.
