= Michael Shanks =

Canadian actor (born 1970)

- Shanks at Dragon Con in 2026
- Born: Michael Garrett Shanks; December 15, 1970 (age 55); Vancouver, British Columbia, Canada
- Occupation: Actor
- Years active: 1993–present
- Spouse: Lexa Doig (m. 2003)
- Partner: Vaitiare Bandera (1997–2000)
- Children: 3

Michael Garrett Shanks (born December 15, 1970) is a Canadian actor. He is best known for his role as Daniel Jackson in the long-running military science fiction television series Stargate SG-1 and as Dr. Charles Harris in the Canadian medical drama Saving Hope. He is also known for his work on low budget genre work filmed in Canada.

== Early life ==
Shanks was born in Vancouver, British Columbia, and grew up in Kamloops. After witnessing Richard Dean Anderson prepare for a scene of MacGyver, Shanks "decided to pursue [acting] a little further", opting to attend the University of British Columbia's fine arts program until 1994. He later appeared in several stage productions while serving a two-year apprenticeship with the prestigious Stratford Festival in Ontario. His television career began with guest appearances on shows including Highlander and The Commish. Parts in the television movies A Family Divided and The Call of the Wild preceded his casting in his breakthrough role as Daniel Jackson in Stargate SG-1.

== Career ==
=== Stargate franchise ===
Shanks played archaeologist Dr Daniel Jackson throughout the first five seasons of Stargate SG-1 before leaving the show at the end of its fifth season, citing creative differences concerning the under-use of his character and the direction of the show as a whole. He made several guest appearances throughout the sixth season playing his own character, as well as voicing the Asgard character Thor. Shanks returned for the seventh and subsequent seasons, winning the Leo Award for Best Lead Performance By A Male in a Dramatic Series in 2004 for the seventh season episode "Lifeboat". During the series' tenth and final season, he signed up for 16 of the 20 episodes, taking some time off in March 2006 for the birth of his third child (second with wife and occasional co-star Lexa Doig).

He appeared in both direct-to-DVD Stargate films released in 2008, Stargate: The Ark of Truth and Stargate: Continuum, and won the 2009 Leo Award for Lead Performance by a Male in a Feature Length Drama for Continuum.

In 2004, Shanks made a crossover appearance (as Daniel Jackson) in the Stargate Atlantis pilot, "Rising". He also appeared in the tenth and eleventh episodes of Atlantis' fifth and final season, and made a cameo appearance in the pilot of the third Stargate series Stargate Universe. He also appeared in the episodes "Human" and "Subversion".

=== Other appearances ===
In 2001, Shanks guest starred in the episode "Star-Crossed" in the Sci-Fi series Andromeda, during which he met his future wife, Lexa Doig. Coincidentally, they played two androids who fell in love with each other. In 2002, Shanks starred in the German/UK/South African co-production Sumuru, a science fiction B-movie, as astronaut Adam Wade. He also auditioned for the role of Shinzon in Star Trek: Nemesis.

In 2007, Shanks joined the Fox Network series 24, guest-starring as lobbyist Mark Bishop in a three-episode arc for season 6. In 2008–2009, Shanks had a recurring role on the second season of the USA Network spy series Burn Notice, playing Victor Stecker-Epps, a fellow burned spy and maniacal counterpoint to series lead Jeffrey Donovan's character. In 2008, Shanks had a guest starring role in one episode of the SciFi Channel series Eureka, as an alchemist somewhat responsible for the near destruction of the town due to a student's mixing chemicals in his lab and thereby creating the "Alchemist curse". He appeared in the episode "All That Glitters...", with a mention of his character in the episode "A Night At Global Dynamics".

Shanks was featured in a lead role in the SciFi Channel's adventure film, The Lost Treasure of the Grand Canyon as Jacob Thain opposite Beverly Hills, 90210 and Charmed alumna Shannen Doherty. The film premiered on the cable network on December 20, 2008. In 2010, Shanks appeared in an episode of Sanctuary, which stars fellow Stargate actor Amanda Tapping. In the same year he starred in the film Arctic Blast, a disaster film, as physicist Jack Tate.

Shanks' had a guest role as archaeologist Carter Hall, DC Comics' superhero Hawkman, in the Smallville episode "Absolute Justice". He later reprised the role in the final episode of the ninth season.

Shanks then appeared in guest spots during the Smallville tenth season episodes "Shield" and "Icarus" as well as appearing in Supernatural season 5 episode "99 Problems".

Shanks stars in the Canadian thriller Faces in the Crowd.

Shanks has also starred in the Fox comedy The Good Guys as the pompous leader of the Strike Force. In 2011, Shanks was the guest star in the third episode of the Showcase show Endgame, where he plays an amnesiac.

In 2012, Shanks returned to primetime as Charles "Charlie" Harris on Saving Hope, reuniting with Stargate SG-1 and Smallville co-star Erica Durance.

In 2019, Shanks played the role of Horace Axley on the second season of the Netflix science-fiction series Altered Carbon.

== Personal life ==
Shanks has a daughter from his relationship with model and actress Vaitiare Bandera, who portrayed Sha're, his character's wife on Stargate SG-1.

On August 2, 2003, Shanks married actress Lexa Doig, whom he met in 2001 while guest-starring on the series Andromeda. (They would also work together on Stargate SG-1, when Doig was cast as Dr Carolyn Lam, a recurring character in seasons nine and ten). They have two children.

Shanks enjoys playing ice hockey and once considered playing professionally. He was on the Stargate SG-1 hockey team, competing against the teams of other Vancouver-based productions such as Smallville, and also displayed his aptitude for the sport in the 2006 television film Under the Mistletoe, in which he played the part of a school hockey coach. This aptitude was also highlighted in his 2013 role as the title character in the television film Mr. Hockey: The Gordie Howe Story.

== Filmography ==
=== Film ===
Key
†	Denotes films that have not yet been released

Year	Title	Role	Notes
2000	Suspicious River	Ball cap man	
2000	Mr Fortune's Smile	James	
2001	The Artist's Circle	Artist	Short film
2001	Suddenly Naked	Danny Blair/Donny Blitzer	
2002	SF Seeks		Not released
2003	Sumuru	Adam Wade	
2003	Dismiss Yourself	Jonny Label	
2007	Mega Snake	Les	
2007	Judicial Indiscretion	Jack Sullivan	
2010	Arctic Blast	Jack Tate	
2010	Red Riding Hood	Adrien Lazar	
2011	Tactical Force	Demetrius	Direct-to-video film; originally titled Hangar 14
2011	Faces in the Crowd	Bryce	
2011	Elysium	Technician #3	
2011	13 Eerie	Professor Tomkins	
2013	The Bouquet	Sam	
2024	Time Cut	Gil Field	
TBA	Never Forget †	Hook	Short film Filming

=== Television ===
Year	Title	Role	Notes
1993	Highlander: The Series	Jesse	Episode: "The Zone"
1995	A Family Divided	Todd	Television film
1997	The Call Of The Wild: Dog Of The Yukon	A gambler	Television film
1997–2007	Stargate SG-1	Daniel Jackson	Main role
1997–2007	Stargate SG-1	Thor	Voice
1997–2007	Stargate SG-1	Ma'chello	2 episodes
1998, 2000	The Outer Limits	Melburn Ross	Episode: "Mary 25"
1998, 2000	The Outer Limits	Dr. Will Olsten	Episode: "Manifest Destiny"
1999	Escape from Mars	Bill Malone, Mission Architect	Television film
2001	Andromeda	Balance of Judgment	Episode: "Star-Crossed"
2001	Andromeda	Gabriel	"Day of judgement, Day of Wrath"
2002	All Around the Town	Justin Donnelly	Television film
2002	Door to Door	John Brady	Television film
2004, 2008	Stargate Atlantis	Daniel Jackson	3 episodes
2005	Swarmed	Kent Horvath	Television film
2006	Under the Mistletoe	Kevin Harrison	Television film
2007	Mega Snake	Les Daniels	Television film
2007	24	Mark Bishop	3 episodes
2007	Eureka	Christopher Dactylos	Episode: "All That Glitters..."
2008	The Lost Treasure of The Grand Canyon	Jacob Thain	Television film
2008	Stargate: The Ark of Truth	Daniel Jackson	Television film
2008	Stargate: Continuum	Daniel Jackson	Television film
2008	Desperate Escape	Michael Coleman	Television film
2008	Burn Notice	Victor	4 episodes
2008	Living Out Loud	Brad Marshall	Television film
2009	Sanctuary	Jimmy	Episode: "Penance"
2009–2010	Stargate Universe	Daniel Jackson	3 episodes
2010	Tower Prep	Dr. Literature	Episode: "Book Report"
2010	Smallville	Hawkman / Carter Hall	4 episodes
2010	Supernatural	Rob	Episode: "99 Problems"
2011	Flashpoint	David Fleming	Episode: "Blue on Blue"
2011	Christmas Lodge	Jack Rand	Television film
2011	The Pastor's Wife	Matthew Winkler	Television film
2012–2017	Saving Hope	Charlie Harris	Main role
2013	Mr. Hockey: The Gordie Howe Story	Gordie Howe	Television film
2016	Hearts of Spring	Andy	Television film
2017	Christmas Homecoming	Sgt. Jim Mullins	Television film
2018	The Detectives	Det. Doug Morrison	Episode: "The Last Fare"
2019	Unspeakable	Will Sanders	8 episodes
2019	Virgin River	Paul/Wes	2 episodes
2019	The College Admissions Scandal	Rick Singer	Television film
2019	Heritage Minutes: D-Day	Major Archie MacNaughton	Canadian history short film
2020	Altered Carbon	Horace Axley	Recurring role
2020	Project Blue Book	Air vice-marshal Christopher Thomas	Episode: "Broken Arrow"
2022	The Good Doctor	Paul	Episode: "A Big Sign"

=== Director ===
Year	Title	Notes
2001	Stargate SG-1	Episode 4.21: "Double Jeopardy"
2014	Saving Hope	Episode 3.04: "Stand By Me"
2016	Saving Hope	Episode 4.14: "You Can't Always Get What You Want"
2017	Saving Hope	Episode 5.14: "We need to talk about Charlie Harris"

=== Writer ===
Year	Title	Notes
2003	Stargate SG-1	Episode 7.11 "Evolution: Part 1"
2004	Stargate SG-1	Episode 7.19: "Resurrection"

=== Video games ===
Year	Title	Role	Notes
2005	Stargate SG-1: The Alliance	Dr. Daniel Jackson (voice)	Cancelled

== Theatre ==
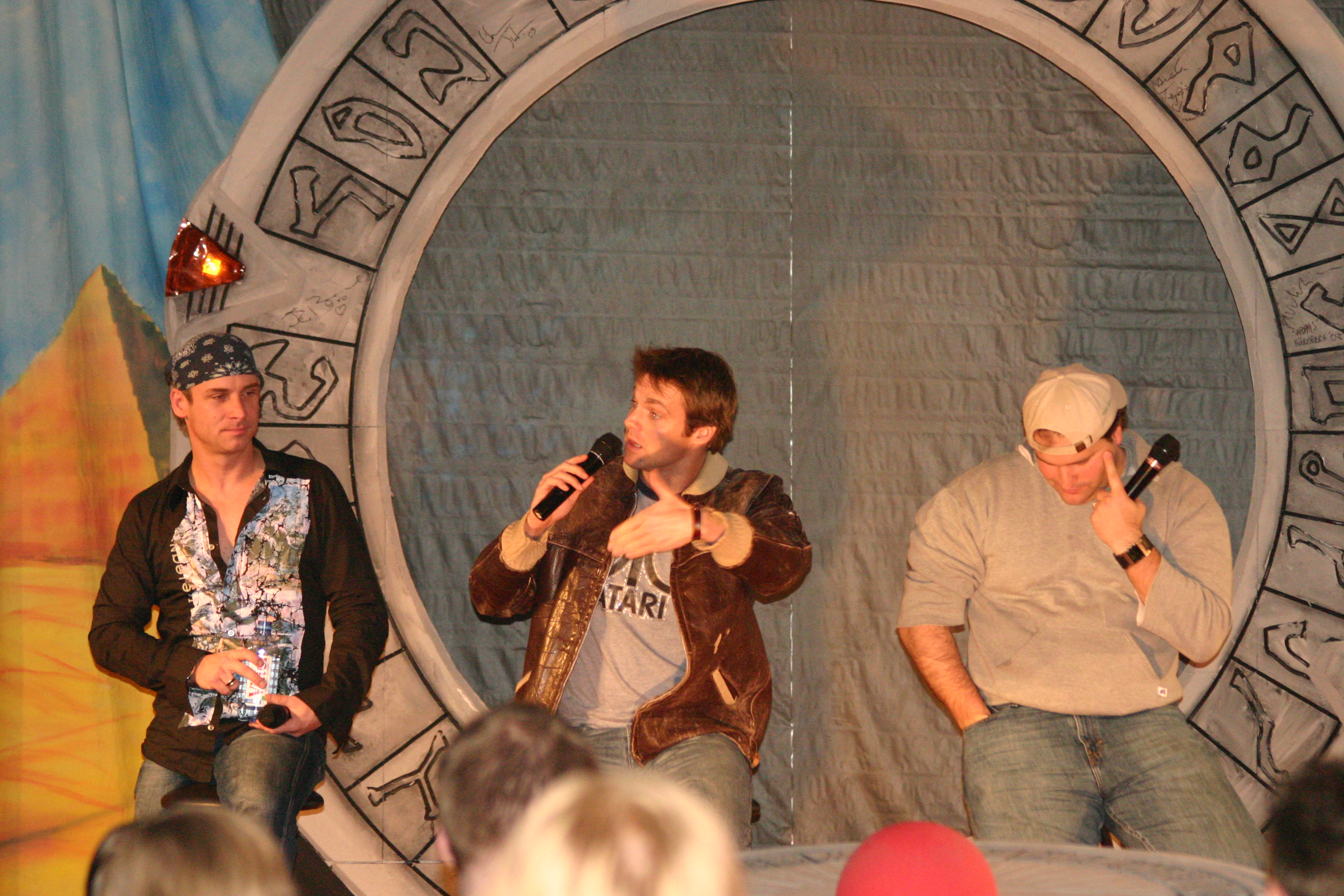
The Directors "The Wild Boys" – Colin Cunningham, Shanks, and Peter DeLuise December 10, 2004

=== Stratford Festival ===
Year	Title	Character	Production
1995 & 1996	The merchant of Venice	Lorenzo	Stratford Festival, Stratford, Ontario
1995 & 1996	King Lear	Cast	Stratford Festival, Stratford, Ontario
1995 & 1996	The merry wives of Windsor	Cast	Stratford Festival, Stratford, Ontario
1995 & 1996	Amadeus	Cast	Stratford Festival, Stratford, Ontario
1995 & 1996	Macbeth	Mentieth	Stratford Festival, Stratford, Ontario

=== University of British Columbia ===
Play	Role	Location
Love's Labours Lost	Don Armado	Frederic Wood Theatre
Dombey & Son	Walter Gray	Frederic Wood Theatre
Leonce & Lena	Leonce	Frederic Wood Theatre
Love of the Nightingale	Tereus	Frederic Wood Theatre
Translations	Lt. Yolland	Frederic Wood Theatre
You're A Good Man, Charlie Brown	Schroeder	Summer Players, Dorothy Somerset Studio
Wait Until Dark	Roat	Summer Players, Dorothy Somerset Studio
Loot	Dennis	Summer Players, Dorothy Somerset Studio
Sure Thing	Clarke	Vancouver Men's Festival
Hopscotch	Will	
The Lion in Winter		

=== Arts Club ===
Year	Title	Character	Production
1998	Hamlet	Hamlet	Stanley Theatre Arts Club, Vancouver, B.C.
