= List of Stargate SG-1 episodes =

Stargate SG-1 is a military science fiction television series created by Brad Wright and Jonathan Glassner. The series resumes the story of the 1994 Stargate film, where a military team led by Colonel Jack O'Neill and supported by the archeologist Daniel Jackson use an ancient alien artifact called the Stargate to travel to a planet where an alien named Ra oppressed the planet's people by posing as a god. After the Earth team defeated Ra, O'Neil returns to Earth while Daniel Jackson stays on the planet. The series pilot, which takes place roughly one year after the events of the film, reveals that Ra was not the only alien to use Stargates to transport human slaves to many worlds for thousands of years.

Stargate SG-1 premiered on July 27, 1997, on the subscription channel Showtime. After five seasons on the same network, the Sci Fi Channel bought Stargate SG-1 and would air it for five further seasons, totalling to 214 episodes in ten seasons (seasons 1 through 7 consisted of 22 episodes each, and seasons 8 through 10 had 20 episodes each). Since the American broadcast splits each season to allow the production to catch up, the British channel Sky One aired the second part of some seasons before their American counterpart. Stargate SG-1's finale episode premiered in the United Kingdom on Sky One on March 13, 2007. The Sci Fi Channel concluded the tenth season on June 22, 2007. All seasons of Stargate SG-1 are available on DVD, and two direct-to-DVD Stargate films have continued the series, the first released in March 2008, the second in July 2008.

The cast of the first five seasons consisted of Richard Dean Anderson starring as Col. Jack O'Neill, Michael Shanks as Dr. Daniel Jackson, and Amanda Tapping as Cpt./Maj. Samantha Carter (who would be promoted to Lieutenant-Colonel in Season 8 and to Colonel in the films), Christopher Judge as the Jaffa alien Teal'c, and Don S. Davis as Maj. Gen. George Hammond. Michael Shanks left the series after Season 5, and his function was assumed by Corin Nemec as the non-earth human Jonas Quinn in Season 6. Shanks continued to have a recurring role in season 6, rejoined the cast in Season 7, and stayed part of the main cast until the series' end. After Don S. Davis' departure from Stargate SG-1 after Season 7, Richard Dean Anderson's character was promoted to Brigadier General in Season 8; Anderson left the series' main cast after that season, but continued to appear periodically. Ben Browder and Beau Bridges replaced them as Lt. Col. Cameron Mitchell and Maj. Gen. Hank Landry in Season 9, respectively. The last actor to join the main cast was Claudia Black, who resumed her previously recurring role as Vala Mal Doran in Season 9.

== Series overview ==
| Season | Episodes | Originally released | | |
| Season | Episodes | First released | Last released | Network |
|---|---|---|---|---|
| 1 | 22 | July 27, 1997 | March 6, 1998 | Showtime |
| 2 | 22 | June 26, 1998 | March 12, 1999 | Showtime |
| 3 | 22 | June 25, 1999 | March 10, 2000 | Showtime |
| 4 | 22 | June 30, 2000 | February 23, 2001 | Showtime |
| 5 | 22 | June 29, 2001 | May 17, 2002 | Showtime |
| 6 | 22 | June 7, 2002 | March 21, 2003 | Sci Fi |
| 7 | 22 | June 19, 2003 | March 19, 2004 | Sci Fi |
| 8 | 20 | July 9, 2004 | March 25, 2005 | Sci Fi |
| 9 | 20 | July 15, 2005 | March 10, 2006 | Sci Fi |
| 10 | 20 | July 14, 2006 | June 22, 2007 | Sci Fi |

== Episodes ==
Note: Episodes in bold are continuous episodes, where the story spans over 2 or more episodes.

=== Season 1 (1997–98) ===
| No. overall | No. in season | Title | Directed by | Written by | Original release date |
|---|---|---|---|---|---|
| 1 | 1 | "**Children of the Gods**" | Mario Azzopardi | Jonathan Glassner & Brad Wright | July 27, 1997 |
| 2 | 2 | "**Children of the Gods**" | Mario Azzopardi | Jonathan Glassner & Brad Wright | July 27, 1997 |
| 3 | 3 | "The Enemy Within" | Dennis Berry | Brad Wright | August 1, 1997 |
| 4 | 4 | "Emancipation" | Jeff Woolnough | Katharyn Powers | August 8, 1997 |
| 5 | 5 | "The Broca Divide" | William Gereghty | Jonathan Glassner | August 15, 1997 |
| 6 | 6 | "The First Commandment" | Dennis Berry | Robert C. Cooper | August 22, 1997 |
| 7 | 7 | "Cold Lazarus" | Kenneth J. Girotti | Jeff F. King | August 29, 1997 |
| 8 | 8 | "The Nox" | Charles Correll | Hart Hanson | September 12, 1997 |
| 9 | 9 | "Brief Candle" | Mario Azzopardi | Story by : Steven Barnes; Teleplay by : Katharyn Powers | September 19, 1997 |
| 10 | 10 | "Thor's Hammer" | Brad Turner | Katharyn Powers | September 26, 1997 |
| 11 | 11 | "The Torment of Tantalus" | Jonathan Glassner | Robert C. Cooper | October 3, 1997 |
| 12 | 12 | "Bloodlines" | Mario Azzopardi | Story by : Mark Saraceni; Teleplay by : Jeff F. King | October 10, 1997 |
| 13 | 13 | "Fire and Water" | Allan Eastman | Story by : Brad Wright & Katharyn Powers; Teleplay by : Katharyn Powers | October 17, 1997 |
| 14 | 14 | "Hathor" | Brad Turner | Story by : David Bennett Carren & J. Larry Carroll; Teleplay by : Jonathan Glassner | October 24, 1997 |
| 15 | 15 | "Singularity" | Mario Azzopardi | Robert C. Cooper | October 31, 1997 |
| 16 | 16 | "Cor-Ai" | Mario Azzopardi | Tom J. Astle | January 23, 1998 |
| 17 | 17 | "Enigma" | William Gereghty | Katharyn Powers | January 30, 1998 |
| 18 | 18 | "Solitudes" | Martin Wood | Brad Wright | February 6, 1998 |
| 19 | 19 | "Tin Man" | Jimmy Kaufman | Jeff F. King | February 13, 1998 |
| 20 | 20 | "**There But for the Grace of God**" | David Warry-Smith | Story by : David Kemper; Teleplay by : Robert C. Cooper | February 20, 1998 |
| 21 | 21 | "**Politics**" | Martin Wood | Teleplay by : Brad Wright; Excerpts by : Jonathan Glassner, Brad Wright, Hart Hanson, Jeff F. King, Robert C. Cooper, Steven Barnes and Katharyn Powers | February 27, 1998 |
| 22 | 22 | "**Within the Serpent's Grasp**" | David Warry-Smith | Story by : James Crocker; Teleplay by : Jonathan Glassner | March 6, 1998 |

=== Season 2 (1998–99) ===
| No. overall | No. in season | Title | Directed by | Written by | Original release date |
|---|---|---|---|---|---|
| 23 | 1 | "**The Serpent's Lair**" | Jonathan Glassner | Brad Wright | June 26, 1998 |
| 24 | 2 | "In the Line of Duty" | Martin Wood | Robert C. Cooper | July 3, 1998 |
| 25 | 3 | "Prisoners" | David Warry-Smith | Terry Curtis Fox | July 10, 1998 |
| 26 | 4 | "The Gamekeeper" | Martin Wood | Story by : Jonathan Glassner & Brad Wright; Teleplay by : Jonathan Glassner | July 17, 1998 |
| 27 | 5 | "Need" | David Warry-Smith | Story by : Robert C. Cooper & Damian Kindler; Teleplay by : Robert C. Cooper | July 24, 1998 |
| 28 | 6 | "Thor's Chariot" | William Gereghty | Katharyn Powers | July 31, 1998 |
| 29 | 7 | "Message in a Bottle" | David Warry-Smith | Story by : Michael Greenburg & Jarrad Paul; Teleplay by : Brad Wright | August 7, 1998 |
| 30 | 8 | "Family" | William Gereghty | Katharyn Powers | August 14, 1998 |
| 31 | 9 | "Secrets" | Duane Clark | Terry Curtis Fox | August 21, 1998 |
| 32 | 10 | "Bane" | David Warry-Smith | Robert C. Cooper | September 25, 1998 |
| 33 | 11 | "**The Tok'ra**" | Brad Turner | Jonathan Glassner | October 2, 1998 |
| 34 | 12 | "**The Tok'ra**" | Brad Turner | Jonathan Glassner | October 9, 1998 |
| 35 | 13 | "Spirits" | Martin Wood | Tor Alexander Valenza | October 23, 1998 |
| 36 | 14 | "Touchstone" | Brad Turner | Sam Egan | October 30, 1998 |
| 37 | 15 (Note: Sky One aired "A Matter of Time" on December 9, 1998, and "The Fifth Race" one week later on December 16, 1998. Showtime, however, aired "The Fifth Race" on January 22, 1999, and "A Matter of Time" one week later on January 29, 1999. The British order is also the episode order on the DVDs.) | "The Fifth Race" | David Warry-Smith | Robert C. Cooper | December 16, 1998 (Sky One); January 22, 1999 (Showtime) |
| 38 | 16 | "A Matter of Time" | Martin Wood | Story by : Misha Rashovich; Teleplay by : Brad Wright | December 9, 1998 (Sky One); January 29, 1999 (Showtime) |
| 39 | 17 (Note: Sky One aired "Serpent's Song" on January 6, 1999, and "Holiday" one week later on January 13, 1999. Showtime, however, aired "Holiday" on February 5, 1999, and "Serpent's Song" one week later on February 12, 1999. The British order is also the episode order on the DVDs.) | "Holiday" | David Warry-Smith | Tor Alexander Valenza | January 13, 1999 (Sky One); February 5, 1999 (Showtime) |
| 40 | 18 | "Serpent's Song" | Peter DeLuise | Katharyn Powers | January 6, 1999 (Sky One); February 12, 1999 (Showtime) |
| 41 | 19 | "One False Step" | William Corcoran | Michael Kaplan & John Sanborn | February 19, 1999 |
| 42 | 20 | "Show and Tell" | Peter DeLuise | Jonathan Glassner | February 26, 1999 |
| 43 | 21 | "1969" | Charles Correll | Brad Wright | March 5, 1999 |
| 44 | 22 | "**Out of Mind**" | Martin Wood | Story by : Jonathan Glassner & Brad Wright; Teleplay by : Jonathan Glassner; Excerpts by : Hart Hanson, Katharyn Powers, Robert C. Cooper, James Crocker, Jonathan Glassner, Brad Wright, Terry Curtis Fox, David Bennett Carren, J. Larry Carroll, Michael Greenburg & Jarrad Paul | March 12, 1999 |

=== Season 3 (1999–2000) ===
| No. overall | No. in season | Title | Directed by | Written by | Original release date |
|---|---|---|---|---|---|
| 45 | 1 | "**Into the Fire**" | Martin Wood | Brad Wright | June 25, 1999 |
| 46 | 2 | "Seth" | William Corcoran | Jonathan Glassner | July 2, 1999 |
| 47 | 3 | "Fair Game" | Martin Wood | Robert C. Cooper | July 9, 1999 |
| 48 | 4 | "Legacy" | Peter DeLuise | Tor Alexander Valenza | July 16, 1999 |
| 49 | 5 | "Learning Curve" | Martin Wood | Heather E. Ash | July 23, 1999 |
| 50 | 6 | "Point of View" | Peter DeLuise | Story by : Jonathan Glassner, Brad Wright, Robert C. Cooper & Tor Alexander Valenza; Teleplay by : Jonathan Glassner & Brad Wright | July 30, 1999 |
| 51 | 7 | "Deadman Switch" | Martin Wood | Robert C. Cooper | August 6, 1999 |
| 52 | 8 | "Demons" | Peter DeLuise | Carl Binder | August 13, 1999 |
| 53 | 9 | "Rules of Engagement" | William Gereghty | Terry Curtis Fox | August 20, 1999 |
| 54 | 10 | "Forever in a Day" | Peter DeLuise | Jonathan Glassner | October 8, 1999 |
| 55 | 11 | "Past and Present" | William Gereghty | Tor Alexander Valenza | October 15, 1999 |
| 56 | 12 | "**Jolinar's Memories**" | Peter DeLuise | Sonny Wareham & Daniel Stashower | October 22, 1999 |
| 57 | 13 | "**The Devil You Know**" | Peter DeLuise | Robert C. Cooper | October 29, 1999 |
| 58 | 14 | "Foothold" | Andy Mikita | Heather E. Ash | November 5, 1999 |
| 59 | 15 | "Pretense" | David Warry-Smith | Katharyn Powers | January 19, 2000 (Sky One); January 21, 2000 (Showtime) |
| 60 | 16 | "Urgo" | Peter DeLuise | Tor Alexander Valenza | January 26, 2000 (Sky One); January 28, 2000 (Showtime) |
| 61 | 17 | "A Hundred Days" | David Warry-Smith | Story by : V. C. James; Teleplay by : Brad Wright | February 14, 2000 (Sky One); February 4, 2000 (Showtime) |
| 62 | 18 | "Shades of Grey" | Martin Wood | Jonathan Glassner | February 9, 2000 (Sky One); February 11, 2000 (Showtime) |
| 63 | 19 | "New Ground" | Chris McMullin | Heather E. Ash | February 16, 2000 (Sky One); February 18, 2000 (Showtime) |
| 64 | 20 | "Maternal Instinct" | Peter F. Woeste | Robert C. Cooper | February 25, 2000 (Sky One); February 25, 2000 (Showtime) |
| 65 | 21 | "Crystal Skull" | Brad Turner | Story by : Michael Greenburg & Jarrad Paul; Teleplay by : Brad Wright | March 3, 2000 (Sky One); March 3, 2000 (Showtime) |
| 66 | 22 | "**Nemesis**" | Martin Wood | Robert C. Cooper | March 8, 2000 (Sky One); March 10, 2000 (Showtime) |

=== Season 4 (2000–01) ===
| No. overall | No. in season | Title | Directed by | Written by | Original release date |
|---|---|---|---|---|---|
| 67 | 1 | "**Small Victories**" | Martin Wood | Robert C. Cooper | June 30, 2000 |
| 68 | 2 | "The Other Side" | Peter DeLuise | Brad Wright | July 7, 2000 |
| 69 | 3 | "Upgrades" | Martin Wood | David Rich | July 14, 2000 |
| 70 | 4 | "Crossroads" | Peter DeLuise | Katharyn Powers | July 21, 2000 |
| 71 | 5 | "Divide and Conquer" | Martin Wood | Tor Alexander Valenza | July 28, 2000 |
| 72 | 6 | "Window of Opportunity" | Peter DeLuise | Joseph Mallozzi & Paul Mullie | August 4, 2000 |
| 73 | 7 | "Watergate" | Martin Wood | Robert C. Cooper | August 11, 2000 |
| 74 | 8 | "The First Ones" | Peter DeLuise | Peter DeLuise | August 18, 2000 |
| 75 | 9 | "Scorched Earth" | Martin Wood | Joseph Mallozzi & Paul Mullie | August 25, 2000 |
| 76 | 10 | "Beneath the Surface" | Peter DeLuise | Heather E. Ash | September 1, 2000 |
| 77 | 11 | "Point of No Return" | William Gereghty | Joseph Mallozzi & Paul Mullie | September 8, 2000 |
| 78 | 12 | "Tangent" | Peter DeLuise | Michael Cassutt | September 15, 2000 |
| 79 | 13 | "The Curse" | Andy Mikita | Joseph Mallozzi & Paul Mullie | September 22, 2000 |
| 80 | 14 | "The Serpent's Venom" | Martin Wood | Peter DeLuise | September 29, 2000 |
| 81 | 15 | "Chain Reaction" | Martin Wood | Joseph Mallozzi & Paul Mullie | December 13, 2000 (Sky One); January 5, 2001 (Showtime) |
| 82 | 16 | "2010" | Andy Mikita | Brad Wright | January 3, 2001 (Sky One); January 12, 2001 (Showtime) |
| 83 | 17 | "Absolute Power" | Peter DeLuise | Robert C. Cooper | January 19, 2001 |
| 84 | 18 | "The Light" | Peter F. Woeste | James Phillips | January 26, 2001 |
| 85 | 19 | "Prodigy" | Peter DeLuise | Story by : Brad Wright, Joseph Mallozzi & Paul Mullie; Teleplay by : Joseph Mallozzi & Paul Mullie | February 2, 2001 |
| 86 | 20 | "Entity" | Allan Lee | Peter DeLuise | February 9, 2001 |
| 87 | 21 | "Double Jeopardy" | Michael Shanks | Robert C. Cooper | February 16, 2001 |
| 88 | 22 | "**Exodus**" | David Warry-Smith | Joseph Mallozzi & Paul Mullie | February 23, 2001 |

=== Season 5 (2001–02) ===
| No. overall | No. in season | Title | Directed by | Written by | Original release date |
|---|---|---|---|---|---|
| 89 | 1 | "**Enemies**" | Martin Wood | Story by : Brad Wright, Robert C. Cooper, Joseph Mallozzi & Paul Mullie; Teleplay by : Robert C. Cooper | June 29, 2001 |
| 90 | 2 | "**Threshold**" | Peter DeLuise | Brad Wright | July 6, 2001 |
| 91 | 3 | "Ascension" | Martin Wood | Robert C. Cooper | July 13, 2001 |
| 92 | 4 | "The Fifth Man" | Peter DeLuise | Joseph Mallozzi & Paul Mullie | July 20, 2001 |
| 93 | 5 | "Red Sky" | Martin Wood | Ron Wilkerson | July 27, 2001 |
| 94 | 6 | "Rite of Passage" | Peter DeLuise | Heather E. Ash | August 3, 2001 |
| 95 | 7 | "Beast of Burden" | Martin Wood | Peter DeLuise | August 10, 2001 |
| 96 | 8 | "The Tomb" | Peter DeLuise | Joseph Mallozzi & Paul Mullie | August 17, 2001 |
| 97 | 9 | "Between Two Fires" | William Gereghty | Ron Wilkerson | August 24, 2001 |
| 98 | 10 | "2001" | Peter DeLuise | Brad Wright | August 31, 2001 |
| 99 | 11 | "Desperate Measures" | William Gereghty | Joseph Mallozzi & Paul Mullie | September 7, 2001 |
| 100 | 12 | "Wormhole X-Treme!" | Peter DeLuise | Story by : Brad Wright, Joseph Mallozzi & Paul Mullie; Teleplay by : Joseph Mallozzi & Paul Mullie | September 14, 2001 |
| 101 | 13 | "Proving Ground" | Andy Mikita | Ron Wilkerson | March 8, 2002 |
| 102 | 14 | "48 Hours" | Peter F. Woeste | Robert C. Cooper | March 15, 2002 |
| 103 | 15 (Note: Sky One aired "Fail Safe" before "Summit" and "Last Stand", although "Fail Safe" follows the two-parter plotwise. Showtime aired the episodes in the right order. The episode order was also correct on DVDs.) | "**Summit**" | Martin Wood | Joseph Mallozzi & Paul Mullie | March 22, 2002 |
| 104 | 16 | "**Last Stand**" | Martin Wood | Robert C. Cooper | March 29, 2002 |
| 105 | 17 | "Fail Safe" | Andy Mikita | Joseph Mallozzi & Paul Mullie | April 5, 2002 |
| 106 | 18 | "The Warrior" | Peter DeLuise | Story by : Christopher Judge; Teleplay by : Peter DeLuise | April 12, 2002 |
| 107 | 19 | "Menace" | Martin Wood | Story by : James Tichenor; Teleplay by : Peter DeLuise | April 26, 2002 |
| 108 | 20 | "The Sentinel" | Peter DeLuise | Ron Wilkerson | May 3, 2002 |
| 109 | 21 | "Meridian" | William Waring | Robert C. Cooper | May 10, 2002 |
| 110 | 22 | "Revelations" | Martin Wood | Joseph Mallozzi & Paul Mullie | May 17, 2002 |

=== Season 6 (2002–03) ===
| No. overall | No. in season | Title | Directed by | Written by | Original release date |
|---|---|---|---|---|---|
| 111 | 1 | "Redemption" | Martin Wood | Robert C. Cooper | June 7, 2002 |
| 112 | 2 | "Redemption" | Martin Wood | Robert C. Cooper | June 14, 2002 |
| 113 | 3 | "Descent" | Peter DeLuise | Joseph Mallozzi & Paul Mullie | June 21, 2002 |
| 114 | 4 | "Frozen" | Martin Wood | Robert C. Cooper | June 28, 2002 |
| 115 | 5 | "Nightwalkers" | Peter DeLuise | Joseph Mallozzi & Paul Mullie | July 12, 2002 |
| 116 | 6 | "Abyss" | Martin Wood | Brad Wright | July 19, 2002 |
| 117 | 7 | "Shadow Play" | Peter DeLuise | Joseph Mallozzi & Paul Mullie | July 26, 2002 |
| 118 | 8 | "The Other Guys" | Martin Wood | Damian Kindler | August 2, 2002 |
| 119 | 9 | "Allegiance" | Peter DeLuise | Peter DeLuise | August 9, 2002 |
| 120 | 10 | "Cure" | Andy Mikita | Damian Kindler | August 16, 2002 |
| 121 | 11 | "**Prometheus**" | Peter F. Woeste | Joseph Mallozzi & Paul Mullie | August 23, 2002 |
| 122 | 12 | "**Unnatural Selection**" | Andy Mikita | Story by : Robert C. Cooper & Brad Wright; Teleplay by : Brad Wright; Excerpts written by : Jeff F. King | December 4, 2002 (Sky One); January 10, 2003 (Sci Fi) |
| 123 | 13 | "Sight Unseen" | Peter F. Woeste | Story by : Ron Wilkerson; Teleplay by : Damian Kindler | December 11, 2002 (Sky One); January 17, 2003 (Sci Fi) |
| 124 | 14 | "Smoke & Mirrors" | Peter DeLuise | Story by : Katharyn Powers; Teleplay by : Joseph Mallozzi & Paul Mullie | December 18, 2002 (Sky One); January 24, 2003 (Sci Fi) |
| 125 | 15 | "Paradise Lost" | William Gereghty | Robert C. Cooper | January 8, 2003 (Sky One); January 31, 2003 (Sci Fi) |
| 126 | 16 | "Metamorphosis" | Peter DeLuise | Story by : Jacqueline Samuda & James Tichenor; Teleplay by : James Tichenor | January 15, 2003 (Sky One); February 7, 2003 (Sci Fi) |
| 127 | 17 | "Disclosure" | William Gereghty | Teleplay by : Joseph Mallozzi & Paul Mullie; Excerpts written by : Heather E. Ash, Michael Cassutt, Robert C. Cooper, Peter DeLuise, Sam Egan, Jonathan Glassner, Michael Greenburg, Joseph Mallozzi, Paul Mullie, Jarrad Paul, Misha Rashovich, James Tichenor, Ron Wilkerson and Brad Wright | January 22, 2003 (Sky One); February 14, 2003 (Sci Fi) |
| 128 | 18 | "Forsaken" | Andy Mikita | Damian Kindler | January 29, 2003 (Sky One); February 21, 2003 (Sci Fi) |
| 129 | 19 | "The Changeling" | Martin Wood | Christopher Judge | February 5, 2003 (Sky One); February 28, 2003 (Sci Fi) |
| 130 | 20 | "Memento" | Peter DeLuise | Damian Kindler | February 12, 2003 (Sky One); March 7, 2003 (Sci Fi) |
| 131 | 21 | "Prophecy" | William Waring | Joseph Mallozzi & Paul Mullie | February 19, 2003 (Sky One); March 14, 2003 (Sci Fi) |
| 132 | 22 | "Full Circle" | Martin Wood | Robert C. Cooper | February 19, 2003 (Sky One); March 21, 2003 (Sci Fi) |

=== Season 7 (2003–04) ===
| No. overall | No. in season | Title | Directed by | Written by | Original release date |
|---|---|---|---|---|---|
| 133 | 1 | "**Fallen**" | Martin Wood | Robert C. Cooper | June 13, 2003 |
| 134 | 2 | "**Homecoming**" | Martin Wood | Joseph Mallozzi & Paul Mullie | June 13, 2003 |
| 135 | 3 | "Fragile Balance" | Peter DeLuise | Story by : Peter DeLuise & Michael Greenburg; Teleplay by : Damian Kindler | June 20, 2003 |
| 136 | 4 | "Orpheus" | Peter DeLuise | Peter DeLuise | June 27, 2003 |
| 137 | 5 | "Revisions" | Martin Wood | Joseph Mallozzi & Paul Mullie | July 11, 2003 |
| 138 | 6 | "Lifeboat" | Peter DeLuise | Brad Wright | July 18, 2003 |
| 139 | 7 | "Enemy Mine" | Peter DeLuise | Peter DeLuise | July 25, 2003 |
| 140 | 8 | "Space Race" | Andy Mikita | Damian Kindler | August 1, 2003 |
| 141 | 9 | "Avenger 2.0" | Martin Wood | Joseph Mallozzi & Paul Mullie | August 8, 2003 |
| 142 | 10 | "Birthright" | Peter F. Woeste | Christopher Judge | August 15, 2003 |
| 143 | 11 | "**Evolution**" | Peter DeLuise | Story by : Damian Kindler & Michael Shanks; Teleplay by : Damian Kindler | August 22, 2003 |
| 144 | 12 | "**Evolution**" | Peter DeLuise | Story by : Damian Kindler & Peter DeLuise; Teleplay by : Peter DeLuise | December 15, 2003 (Sky One); January 9, 2004 (Sci Fi) |
| 145 | 13 | "Grace" | Peter F. Woeste | Damian Kindler | January 6, 2004 (Sky One); January 16, 2004 (Sci Fi) |
| 146 | 14 | "Fallout" | Martin Wood | Story by : Corin Nemec; Teleplay by : Joseph Mallozzi & Paul Mullie | January 13, 2004 (Sky One); January 23, 2004 (Sci Fi) |
| 147 | 15 | "Chimera" | William Waring | Story by : Robert C. Cooper; Teleplay by : Damian Kindler | January 20, 2004 (Sky One); January 30, 2004 (Sci Fi) |
| 148 | 16 | "Death Knell" | Peter DeLuise | Peter DeLuise | January 27, 2004 (Sky One); February 6, 2004 (Sci Fi) |
| 149 | 17 | "**Heroes**" | Andy Mikita | Robert C. Cooper | February 3, 2004 (Sky One); February 13, 2004 (Sci Fi) |
| 150 | 18 | "**Heroes**" | Andy Mikita | Robert C. Cooper | February 10, 2004 (Sky One); February 20, 2004 (Sci Fi) |
| 151 | 19 | "Resurrection" | Amanda Tapping | Michael Shanks | February 17, 2004 (Sky One); February 27, 2004 (Sci Fi) |
| 152 | 20 | "Inauguration" | Peter F. Woeste | Teleplay by : Joseph Mallozzi & Paul Mullie; Excerpts written by : Robert C. Cooper, Peter DeLuise, Damian Kindler, Joseph Mallozzi, Paul Mullie, Katharyn Powers, David Rich, Michael Shanks, Ron Wilkerson and Brad Wright | February 24, 2004 (Sky One); March 5, 2004 (Sci Fi) |
| 153 | 21 | "**Lost City**" | Martin Wood | Brad Wright & Robert C. Cooper | March 2, 2004 (Sky One); March 12, 2004 (Sci Fi) |
| 154 | 22 | "**Lost City**" | Martin Wood | Brad Wright & Robert C. Cooper | March 9, 2004 (Sky One); March 19, 2004 (Sci Fi) |

=== Season 8 (2004–05) ===
| No. overall | No. in season | Title | Directed by | Written by | Original release date |
|---|---|---|---|---|---|
| 155 | 1 | "New Order" | Andy Mikita | Joseph Mallozzi & Paul Mullie | July 9, 2004 |
| 156 | 2 | "New Order" | Andy Mikita | Robert C. Cooper | July 9, 2004 |
| 157 | 3 | "Lockdown" | William Waring | Joseph Mallozzi & Paul Mullie | July 23, 2004 |
| 158 | 4 | "Zero Hour" | Peter F. Woeste | Robert C. Cooper | July 30, 2004 |
| 159 | 5 | "Icon" | Peter F. Woeste | Damian Kindler | August 6, 2004 |
| 160 | 6 | "Avatar" | Martin Wood | Damian Kindler | August 13, 2004 |
| 161 | 7 (Note: "Affinity" was originally written to air after "Covenant", but the episode order was switched for production reasons. This created slight continuity errors in regards to the naming of the Trust.) | "Affinity" | Peter DeLuise | Peter DeLuise | August 20, 2004 |
| 162 | 8 | "Covenant" | Martin Wood | Story by : Ron Wilkerson; Teleplay by : Ron Wilkerson & Robert C. Cooper | August 27, 2004 |
| 163 | 9 | "Sacrifices" | Andy Mikita | Christopher Judge | September 10, 2004 |
| 164 | 10 | "Endgame" | Peter DeLuise | Joseph Mallozzi & Paul Mullie | September 17, 2004 |
| 165 | 11 | "Gemini" | William Waring | Peter DeLuise | December 14, 2004 (Sky One); January 21, 2005 (Sci Fi) |
| 166 | 12 | "Prometheus Unbound" | Andy Mikita | Damian Kindler | December 21, 2004 (Sky One); January 28, 2005 (Sci Fi) |
| 167 | 13 | "It's Good to Be King" | William Gereghty | Story by : Michael Greenburg & Peter DeLuise & Joseph Mallozzi & Paul Mullie; Teleplay by : Joseph Mallozzi & Paul Mullie | January 4, 2005 (Sky One); February 4, 2005 (Sci Fi) |
| 168 | 14 | "Full Alert" | Andy Mikita | Joseph Mallozzi & Paul Mullie | January 11, 2005 (Sky One); February 11, 2005 (Sci Fi) |
| 169 | 15 (Note: Some DVD regions put "Citizen Joe" after the "Reckoning" two-parter and "Threads". "Citizen Joe" however comes before these episodes plotwise in regards to O'Neill's new girlfriend.) | "Citizen Joe" | Andy Mikita | Story by : Robert C. Cooper; Teleplay by : Damian Kindler; Excerpts written by : Robert C. Cooper, James Crocker, Peter DeLuise, Jonathan Glassner, V.C. James, Damian Kindler, Joseph Mallozzi, Paul Mullie, Brad Wright | January 18, 2005 (Sky One); February 18, 2005 (Sci Fi) |
| 170 | 16 | "Reckoning" | Peter DeLuise | Damian Kindler | January 25, 2005 (Sky One); February 25, 2005 (Sci Fi) |
| 171 | 17 | "Reckoning" | Peter DeLuise | Teleplay by : Damian Kindler; Excerpts written by : Robert C. Cooper | February 1, 2005 (Sky One); March 4, 2005 (Sci Fi) |
| 172 | 18 (Note: "Threads" original airing was 63 mins long; the original DVD version is cut to the standard 44 mins. The repackaged DVD restores the 63 min version.) | "Threads" | Andy Mikita | Teleplay by : Robert C. Cooper; Excerpts written by : Damian Kindler | February 8, 2005 (Sky One); March 11, 2005 (Sci Fi) |
| 173 | 19 | "Moebius" | Peter DeLuise | Story by : Joseph Mallozzi, Paul Mullie, Brad Wright & Robert C. Cooper; Teleplay by : Joseph Mallozzi & Paul Mullie | February 15, 2005 (Sky One); March 18, 2005 (Sci Fi) |
| 174 | 20 | "Moebius" | Peter DeLuise | Story by : Joseph Mallozzi, Paul Mullie, Brad Wright & Robert C. Cooper; Teleplay by : Robert C. Cooper | February 22, 2005 (Sky One); March 25, 2005 (Sci Fi) |

=== Season 9 (2005–06) ===
| No. overall | No. in season | Title | Directed by | Written by | Original release date | US viewers (millions) |
|---|---|---|---|---|---|---|
| 175 | 1 | "**Avalon**" | Andy Mikita | Teleplay by : Robert C. Cooper; Excerpts written by : Robert C. Cooper & Brad Wright | July 15, 2005 | 2.1 |
| 176 | 2 | "**Avalon**" | Andy Mikita | Robert C. Cooper | July 22, 2005 | 2.1 |
| 177 | 3 | "**Origin**" | Brad Turner | Robert C. Cooper | July 29, 2005 | 2.0 |
| 178 | 4 | "The Ties That Bind" | William Waring | Joseph Mallozzi & Paul Mullie | August 5, 2005 | 2.0 |
| 179 | 5 | "The Powers That Be" | William Waring | Martin Gero | August 12, 2005 | 2.0 |
| 180 | 6 | "Beachhead" | Brad Turner | Brad Wright | August 19, 2005 | 1.9 |
| 181 | 7 | "Ex Deus Machina" | Martin Wood | Joseph Mallozzi & Paul Mullie | August 26, 2005 | 1.9 |
| 182 | 8 | "Babylon" | Peter DeLuise | Damian Kindler | September 9, 2005 | 2.0 |
| 183 | 9 | "Prototype" | Peter DeLuise | Alan McCullough | September 16, 2005 | 1.8 |
| 184 | 10 | "**The Fourth Horseman**" | Andy Mikita | Damian Kindler | September 16, 2005 | 1.8 |
| 185 | 11 | "**The Fourth Horseman**" | Andy Mikita | Joseph Mallozzi & Paul Mullie | January 6, 2006 | 1.9 |
| 186 | 12 | "Collateral Damage" | William Waring | Joseph Mallozzi & Paul Mullie | January 13, 2006 | 1.7 |
| 187 | 13 | "Ripple Effect" | Peter DeLuise | Story by : Brad Wright, Joseph Mallozzi & Paul Mullie; Teleplay by : Joseph Mallozzi & Paul Mullie | January 20, 2006 | 1.8 |
| 188 | 14 | "Stronghold" | Peter DeLuise | Teleplay by : Alan McCullough; Excerpts written by : Robert C. Cooper, Martin Gero and Brad Wright | January 27, 2006 | 1.8 |
| 189 | 15 | "Ethon" | Ken Girotti | Story by : Damian Kindler & Robert C. Cooper; Teleplay by : Damian Kindler | February 3, 2006 | 1.6 |
| 190 | 16 | "Off the Grid" | Peter DeLuise | Alan McCullough | February 10, 2006 | 1.6 |
| 191 | 17 | "The Scourge" | Ken Girotti | Joseph Mallozzi & Paul Mullie | February 17, 2006 | 1.6 |
| 192 | 18 | "Arthur's Mantle" | Peter DeLuise | Alan McCullough | February 24, 2006 | 1.7 |
| 193 | 19 | "**Crusade**" | Robert C. Cooper | Robert C. Cooper | March 3, 2006 | 1.8 |
| 194 | 20 | "**Camelot**" | Martin Wood | Joseph Mallozzi & Paul Mullie | March 10, 2006 | 1.9 |

=== Season 10 (2006–07) ===
| No. overall | No. in season | Title | Directed by | Written by | Original release date |
|---|---|---|---|---|---|
| 195 | 1 | "**Flesh and Blood**" | William Waring | Robert C. Cooper | July 14, 2006 |
| 196 | 2 | "Morpheus" | Andy Mikita | Joseph Mallozzi & Paul Mullie | July 21, 2006 |
| 197 | 3 | "The Pegasus Project" | William Waring | Brad Wright | July 28, 2006 |
| 198 | 4 | "Insiders" | Peter F. Woeste | Alan McCullough | August 4, 2006 |
| 199 | 5 | "Uninvited" | William Waring | Damian Kindler | August 11, 2006 |
| 200 | 6 | "200" | Martin Wood | Brad Wright & Robert C. Cooper & Joseph Mallozzi & Paul Mullie & Carl Binder & Martin Gero & Alan McCullough | August 18, 2006 |
| 201 | 7 | "Counterstrike" | Andy Mikita | Joseph Mallozzi & Paul Mullie | August 25, 2006 |
| 202 | 8 | "Memento Mori" | Peter DeLuise | Joseph Mallozzi & Paul Mullie | September 8, 2006 |
| 203 | 9 | "Company of Thieves" | William Waring | Alan McCullough | September 15, 2006 |
| 204 | 10 | "The Quest" | Andy Mikita | Joseph Mallozzi & Paul Mullie | September 22, 2006 |
| 205 | 11 | "The Quest" | Andy Mikita | Joseph Mallozzi & Paul Mullie | January 9, 2007 (Sky One); April 13, 2007 (Sci Fi) |
| 206 | 12 | "Line in the Sand" | Peter DeLuise | Alan McCullough | January 16, 2007 (Sky One); April 20, 2007 (Sci Fi) |
| 207 | 13 | "The Road Not Taken" | Andy Mikita | Alan McCullough | January 23, 2007 (Sky One); April 27, 2007 (Sci Fi) |
| 208 | 14 | "The Shroud" | Andy Mikita | Story by : Robert C. Cooper & Brad Wright; Teleplay by : Robert C. Cooper | January 30, 2007 (Sky One); May 4, 2007 (Sci Fi) |
| 209 | 15 | "Bounty" | Peter DeLuise | Teleplay by : Damian Kindler; Excerpts written by : Robert C. Cooper and Ron Wilkerson | February 6, 2007 (Sky One); May 11, 2007 (Sci Fi) |
| 210 | 16 | "Bad Guys" | Peter DeLuise | Story by : Ben Browder & Martin Gero; Teleplay by : Martin Gero | February 13, 2007 (Sky One); May 18, 2007 (Sci Fi) |
| 211 | 17 | "Talion" | Andy Mikita | Damian Kindler | February 20, 2007 (Sky One); June 1, 2007 (Sci Fi) |
| 212 | 18 | "Family Ties" | Peter DeLuise | Joseph Mallozzi & Paul Mullie | February 27, 2007 (Sky One); June 8, 2007 (Sci Fi) |
| 213 | 19 | "Dominion" | William Waring | Story by : Alex Levine; Teleplay by : Alan McCullough | March 6, 2007 (Sky One); June 15, 2007 (Sci Fi) |
| 214 | 20 | "Unending" | Robert C. Cooper | Robert C. Cooper | March 13, 2007 (Sky One); June 22, 2007 (Sci Fi) |

== Movies ==
After the SciFi Channel's decision to not renew Stargate SG-1 in 2006, the SG-1 producers and rights-holder MGM expressed a desire to continue SG-1 as a movie, mini-series, or an 11th season on another network. Brad Wright confirmed the production of two direct-to-DVD films in October 2006, which eventually became Stargate: The Ark of Truth and Stargate: Continuum. A special edition of the two-hour pilot episode "Children of the Gods" with re-edited scenes, all new visual effects, and a new score by Joel Goldsmith was released in July 2009. In April 2009, MGM confirmed a third new SG-1 film that Brad Wright had first announced in May 2008. However, this last project (entitled Stargate: Revolution) was put on hold and eventually got shelved permanently in 2011.

| Title | Directed by | Written by | Original airdate |
|---|---|---|---|
| Stargate: The Ark of Truth | Robert C. Cooper | Robert C. Cooper | March 24, 2008 (Sky One) |
| Stargate: Continuum | Martin Wood | Brad Wright | August 18, 2008 (Sky One) |
| Stargate SG-1: Children of the Gods Final Cut | Mario Azzopardi | Jonathan Glassner & Brad Wright | — |

== Home media ==
| Product | Episodes | DVD release date | | | Blu-ray release date | |
| Product | Episodes | Region 1 | Region 2 | Region 4 | Region A | Region B |
|---|---|---|---|---|---|---|
| Season 1 (1997–98) | 22 | May 22, 2001 | October 21, 2002 | March 1, 2004 | —N/a | —N/a |
| Season 2 (1998–99) | 22 | September 3, 2002 | January 27, 2003 | February 18, 2004 | —N/a | —N/a |
| Season 3 (1999–2000) | 22 | June 17, 2003 | February 24, 2003 | May 11, 2004 | —N/a | —N/a |
| Season 4 (2000–01) | 22 | September 2, 2003 | March 31, 2003 | August 17, 2004 | —N/a | —N/a |
| Season 5 (2001–02) | 22 | January 20, 2004 | April 28, 2003 | November 17, 2004 | —N/a | —N/a |
| Season 6 (2002–03) | 22 | March 2, 2004 | February 2, 2004 | January 17, 2005 | —N/a | —N/a |
| Season 7 (2003–04) | 22 | October 19, 2004 | February 28, 2005 | March 14, 2005 | —N/a | —N/a |
| Season 8 (2004–05) | 20 | October 4, 2005 | February 27, 2006 | August 17, 2005 | —N/a | —N/a |
| Season 9 (2005–06) | 20 | October 3, 2006 | February 9, 2007 | August 15, 2006 | —N/a | —N/a |
| Season 10 (2006–07) | 20 | July 24, 2007 | December 3, 2007 | August 26, 2007 | —N/a | —N/a |
| The Complete Series Collection | 214 | October 9, 2007 | December 3, 2007 | November 28, 2007 | December 18, 2020 | —N/a |
| Stargate: The Ark of Truth | film | March 11, 2008 | April 14, 2008 | April 8, 2008 | January 13, 2009 | —N/a |
| Stargate: Continuum | film | July 29, 2008 | August 18, 2008 | August 5, 2008 | July 29, 2008 | August 18, 2008 |
| Stargate SG-1: Children of the Gods – Final Cut | film | July 21, 2009 | July 27, 2009 | August 5, 2009 | —N/a | —N/a |
| The Complete Collection | 214 & 2 films | —N/a | November 17, 2008 | March 10, 2009 | —N/a | —N/a |

== See also ==
- List of Stargate Atlantis episodes
- List of Stargate Universe episodes
