= Within the Serpent's Grasp =

- Stargate SG-1 episode
- Episode no.: Season 1 Episode 22
- Directed by: David Warry-Smith
- Written by: James Crocker; Jonathan Glassner
- Cinematography by: Peter Woeste
- Editing by: Allan Lee
- Production code: 122
- Original air date: March 6, 1998
- Running time: 44 minutes

Guest appearances
- Peter Williams as Apophis; Alexis Cruz as Skaara; Brent Stait as Major Louis Ferretti; Gary Jones as Chevron Guy

Episode chronology
← Previous "Politics"	Next → "The Serpent's Lair"
- Stargate SG-1 (season 1)

"Within the Serpent's Grasp" is the first season finale of the science fiction television series Stargate SG-1. The episode continues on from the events of "There But for the Grace of God" and "Politics" and concludes in the season 2 opening episode "The Serpent's Lair". Written by James Crocker, showrunner Jonathan Glassner adapted the story into a teleplay, with David Warry-Smith directing. The episode first aired on March 6, 1998 on Showtime in the United States and on August 26, 1998 on Sky One in the United Kingdom.

In this episode, the Stargate program has been shut down, but believing an attack on Earth by the Goa'uld Apophis (Peter Williams) is imminent, Daniel Jackson (Michael Shanks) convinces his teammates, Jack O'Neill (Richard Dean Anderson), Samantha Carter (Amanda Tapping) and Teal'c (Christopher Judge) to violate orders and travel through the Stargate to where he believes the attack will originate from.

== Plot ==
Senator Kinsey has seen to it that the Stargate program is shut down. After his recent visit to an alternate reality Earth, which had been devastated by the Goa'uld Apophis, Dr. Daniel Jackson (Michael Shanks) convinces his SG-1 teammates that their Earth will suffer the same fate unless they act. Having learnt where he believes the attack will originate from in the other reality, the team violate orders and travel through the Stargate. On the other side, they find themselves in a pitch-black room filled with containers full of Goa'uld weapons.

As they navigate the corridors, SG-1 soon discover they're not on another planet, but rather a Goa'uld mothership which is heading for Earth. Back on Earth, General Hammond (Don S. Davis) orders Major Ferretti (Brent Stait) to retrieve SG-1, but they are unable to reconnect to the Stargate coordinates Dr. Jackson used.

SG-1 return to the cargo room, where the Goa'uld soldiers are gathered around a Sarcophagus as they watch a communication from Apophis. The Sarcophagus opens and Apophis unveils his son, Klorel. The team immediately recognise Klorel as the now Goal'uld possessed Skaara (Alexis Cruz). Colonel Jack O'Neill (Richard Dean Anderson) orders Captain Samantha Carter (Amanda Tapping) and Daniel to plant explosives all over the ship while he and Teal'c (Christopher Judge) grab Klorel, in the hope that Skaara can fight the Goa'uld within him.

They capture Klorel and only after shooting him with a Goa'uld Zat'nik'tel is Skaara able to surface long enough to ask for O'Neill's forgiveness in what he's about to do. As Klorel regains control, the Jaffa guard force their way into the room and capture O'Neill and Teal'c. Apophis orders Klorel to kill O'Neill and Teal'c, but Skaara is able to assert enough influence to delay it and instead takes them to the bridge. Carter and Daniel attack Klorel's forces in order to free O'Neill and Teal'c, but in the firefight Klorel grabs Daniel attempting to kill him with a Goa'uld hand device. Left with no other choice, O'Neill shoots Klorel. The team look out of the window as the ship approaches Earth.

== Production ==
This is the only episode written by James Crocker, with showrunner Jonathan Glassner adapting it into a teleplay. David Warry-Smith directed the episode, having previously directed the first part of this story, "There But For the Grace of God". Joel Goldsmith scored the episode. A suite of the music featured in the episode was featured on the 2001 soundtrack album The Best Of Stargate SG-1 Season 1.

Alexis Cruz returned for the first time since the opening episode, "Children of the Gods" as Skaara who is possessed by the Goa'uld Klorel. Cruz noted that he found it challenging to make Klorel as different to Skaara as possible. Brent Stait also returned for the first time since the pilot, reprising his role as Major Louis Ferretti for his final onscreen appearance. Peter Williams reprises his role as the Goa'uld System Lord Apophis.

Over the course of season 1, Brad Wright and Glassner were alarmed at the body count left behind after every time the forces of Earth and Goa'uld fought each other. As a response to this, Glassner introduced a new weapon in this episode, the Goa'uld Zat'nik'tel, which would stun enemies with a single shot, kill with a second and disintegrate with a third. The design for the final weapon was completed by Ken Rabehl, before being passed onto the prop making team.

The episode was filmed entirely in the Stargate Command set on Stage 5 of The Bridge Studios and on a new Goa'uld mothership set. This marks the first time the interior of a Goa'uld Ha'tak mothership is featured onscreen. Production designer Richard Hudolin oversaw the design, with new sets built specifically for the episode and its conclusion in season 2's "The Serpent's Lair".

Two different versions of the scene involving a Goa'uld communication device were filmed and aired. In the original which aired on Showtime, O'Neill quips "Think it gets Showtime?". Syndicated, other airings and releases instead used O'Neill saying "Mmmmm … Goa'uld TV" in the manner of Simpsons character Homer.

John Gajdecki oversaw some of the visual effects, including a virtual Glider Bay set extension to the Goa'uld Ha'tak. The Glider Bay was created using a combination of practical models, such as the Goa'uld Death Gliders fighter craft, visual effects and live action photography. In order to place the Goa'uld Jaffa foot soldiers onto the various catwalks, the actors were placed on tall scaffolding against greenscreen to be correctly composited into the shot. Gajdecki's team also constructed differently sized versions of the Goa'uld mothership in order to achieve the required shots.

== Release and Reception ==
In the UK, the episode received 0.63 million viewers on Sky One. "Within the Serpent's Grasp" and previous episode "Politics" were first released on VHS on February 1, 2000. The following month, this episode was one of four episodes featured on the first Stargate SG-1 DVD release, Stargate SG-1 – Best of Series 1, released on March 20, 2000. The episode was then featured in the season 1 Volume 5 release on May 22, 2001.

Starburst, whilst critical of previous episode "Politics", they positively received the finale. The reviewer called it "an exhilarating end of season cliff-hanger", noting that "it boasts massive sets, some gob-smacking moments and a fine crisis of conscience".

Writing for Cult Times, Jonathan Wright believed that the first season had suffered from unfavourable comparisons to the original 1994 film, which he called "dull" and that it was an "unwritten rule that any new Science Fiction series is utter pants until Season Two begins and everyone decides they really liked the show all along". He went on to write "Don't expect the story to be resolved – it's cliffhanger time – but do expect to see a series which is getting better and better".

In a retrospective 2015 rewatch of the first season Stargate SG-1, Tor.com writer Keith R.A. DeCandido believed "Within the Serpent's Grasp to be the best episode of the season, calling it a "tense adventure". He highlighted Richard Dean Anderson's performance as Jack O'Neill, appreciating that by the end of the season he had moved even farther from Kurt Russell's "chain-smoking hardass" depiction in the 1994 film, to a "cynical-but-compassionate leader".

"Within the Serpent's Grasp" was nominated for a Gemini Award in the category "Best Visual Effects".
