= Stargate SG-1 season 3 =

Season of television series

Stargate SG-1
- Season 3
- DVD cover
- Starring: Richard Dean Anderson; Michael Shanks; Amanda Tapping; Christopher Judge; Don S. Davis
- No. of episodes: 22

Release
- Original network: Showtime
- Original release: June 25, 1999 – March 8, 2000

Season chronology
- ← Previous; Season 2 Next → Season 4

The third season of the military science fiction television series Stargate SG-1 commenced airing on Showtime in the United States on June 25, 1999, concluded on Sky1 in the United Kingdom on March 8, 2000, and contained 22 episodes. The third season follows SG-1 in their fight against the Goa'uld Empire's System Lords, the main being Sokar until "The Devil You Know" and then Apophis, after he regained power during that episode. The season introduces the long-unseen and unnamed enemy of the Asgards, the Replicators, who are self-replicating machines that seek to convert all civilizations into more of themselves, thus posing a dire threat to all other beings. The Replicators are first mentioned, but not named, in season three episode "Fair Game".

The one-hour premiere "Into the Fire", which debuted on June 25, 1999, on Showtime did not receive any syndication rating, but overall got a high viewership level. The series was developed by Brad Wright and Jonathan Glassner, who also served as executive producers. Season 3 regular cast members include Richard Dean Anderson, Michael Shanks, Amanda Tapping, with Christopher Judge, and Don S. Davis.

== Production ==
"Deadman Switch" is the first episode in which the Stargate is not seen. "Demons" was Carl Binder's first and only contribution to Stargate SG-1. He would later become a staff writer on the spin-off series Stargate Atlantis.

The urban outdoor scenes of Tollana in "Pretense" were shot on the main campus of Simon Fraser University (S.F.U.) in Burnaby, a small city just east of Vancouver.

Actor Dom DeLuise, who played Urgo and Togar in "Urgo", is the father of director Peter DeLuise, and Urgo's transformation into an Air Force officer was played by Peter. "Urgo" marked the first time a DeLuise guest-starred on the show. Dom's sons Peter, Michael, and David, Dom's daughter-in-law and Peter's wife, Anne Marie, had on-screen roles in later seasons. Dom DeLuise ad-libbed most of his lines. According to the Official Guide to Seasons Three and Four, very few scenes include Teal'c, since actor Christopher Judge could not keep a straight face.

Jackson's appendicitis in "Nemesis" reflected Michael Shanks' real-world condition; it was written into the script at the last minute because the writers needed to drastically reduce Shanks' role to allow for his recovery. Shanks' scenes in the episode were actually shot a week after filming of the episode was completed.

When Seth is killed in "Seth", Jack O'Neill's "Hail Dorothy" is a reference to The Wizard of Oz.

== Reception ==
"Into the Fire" was nominated for a Leo Award in the category "Best Cinematography in a Dramatic Series". For "Point of View", Amanda Tapping was nominated for a Leo Award in the category "Best Performance by a Female in a Dramatic Series". For "Forever in a Day", Michael Shanks was nominated for a Leo Award in the category "Best Performance by a male in a Dramatic Series". "The Devil You Know" was nominated for a Leo Award in the category "Best Production Design in a Dramatic Series". For "A Hundred Days", Brad Wright and Victoria James were nominated for a Leo Award in the category "Best Screenwriter of a Dramatic Series". "Nemesis" was nominated for an Emmy in the category "Outstanding Special Visual Effects for a Series", and won a Leo Award in the category "Best Overall Sound in a Dramatic Series".

== Main cast ==
- Starring Richard Dean Anderson as Colonel Jack O'Neill
- Michael Shanks as Dr. Daniel Jackson
- Amanda Tapping as Captain/Major Samantha Carter
- With Christopher Judge as Teal'c
- And Don S. Davis as Major General George Hammond

== Episodes ==
Episodes in bold are continuous episodes, where the story spans over 2 or more episodes.

No. overall	No. in season	Title	Directed by	Written by	Original release date
45	1	"**Into the Fire**"	Martin Wood	Brad Wright	June 25, 1999
The SGC sends a rescue mission to Hathor's base to retrieve SG-1, and O'Neill kills Hathor. Using Tok'ra tunnels already present on the planet, SG-1 escapes and returns home.
46	2	"Seth"	William Corcoran	Jonathan Glassner	July 2, 1999
The Tok'ra seek a Goa'uld named Seth, who has lived on Earth for thousands of years and now is the leader of a dangerous cult. SG-1 uses zats to overcome the cult members' brainwashing, and in the ensuing rescue, Seth is killed by Carter.
47	3	"Fair Game"	Martin Wood	Robert C. Cooper	July 9, 1999
Captain Carter is promoted to the rank of Major. The Asgard warn the SGC that the Goa'uld are planning an attack on Earth. With the help of the Asgard, SG-1 negotiates with three Goa'uld System Lords, Cronus, Nirrti, and Yu, to bring Earth into the Protected Planets Treaty. An attack on Cronus endangers the deal.
48	4	"Legacy"	Peter DeLuise	Tor Alexander Valenza	July 16, 1999
On PY3-948, SG-1 finds corpses of several humans who had clearly once had Goa'uld symbiotes. Upon returning, Jackson shows signs of schizophrenia. The cause is a Goa'uld-killer of Ma'chello's (having a strange effect on a non-Goa'uld), and the devices are neutralized.
49	5	"Learning Curve"	Martin Wood	Heather E. Ash	July 23, 1999
SG-1 visits a planet named Orban where knowledge is harvested through its children (called "Urrone"). When a Urrone reaches a certain age, their nanites are harvested and they regress to an infantile state and remain that way as the Orbanians have no concept of traditional education.
50	6	"Point of View"	Peter DeLuise	Story by : Jonathan Glassner, Brad Wright, Robert C. Cooper & Tor Alexander Valenza; Teleplay by : Jonathan Glassner & Brad Wright	July 30, 1999
Using the mirror from "There But For the Grace of God", an alternate Carter and Charles Kawalsky come to the SGC from an Earth that has been invaded by the Goa'uld. SG-1 saves the alternate reality by contacting the Asgard there.
51	7	"Deadman Switch"	Martin Wood	Robert C. Cooper	August 6, 1999
SG-1 is captured by a bounty hunter (Sam J. Jones) who uses them to help catch a Tok'ra named Korra (Mark Holden). The Goa'uld has his race addicted to a drug that can be supplied only by them, but he repents at the last moment and asks Sam to help free his race from the drug.
52	8	"Demons"	Peter DeLuise	Carl Binder	August 13, 1999
SG-1 visits a planet ruled by a Goa'uld-infested Unas, who uses the persona of the Devil to keep the residents ruled by fear. They free the people of the 'devil' and instruct them to bury the Stargate.
53	9	"Rules of Engagement"	William Gereghty	Terry Curtis Fox	August 20, 1999
SG-1 discovers a planet where Apophis was training human slaves to infiltrate the SGC. SG-1 shows them footage of Apophis dying, and they all renounce him as a false god.
54	10	"Forever in a Day"	Peter DeLuise	Jonathan Glassner	October 8, 1999
After being found on P8X-873, Daniel's wife Sha're is killed by Teal'c to prevent the Goa'uld that controls her from killing Daniel. Daniel quits the SGC and then starts having visions: a residual thought transferred to him by Sha're in the last moments – he must find her son Shifu who is known to be a Harcesis.
55	11	"Past and Present"	William Gereghty	Tor Alexander Valenza	October 15, 1999
SG-1 travels to a world named Vyus (P2Q-463) where the people have lost their memories in an event called the "Vorlix" and are in search of their Elders. The "Vorlix" was following a visit from Linea ("The Destroyer of Worlds", "Prisoners"), and they feel responsible for the problems on Vyus. Ke'ra (Megan Leitch), a young woman with vast knowledge about biochemistry, who assists them to research the world's past, connects strongly with Daniel. Orner is played by Jason Gray-Stanford.
56	12	"**Jolinar's Memories**"	Peter DeLuise	Sonny Wareham & Daniel Stashower	October 22, 1999
Jacob/Selmak is captured by Sokar. Jolinar was the only person to escape from Sokar's home moon Ne'tu (hell) near the planet Delmak, and Carter has residual memories of the method. SG-1 is captured, and discovers that Apophis controls the moon.
57	13	"**The Devil You Know**"	Peter DeLuise	Robert C. Cooper	October 29, 1999
SG-1 manages to escape from Ne'tu with Jacob and Selmak and back to Earth. They use a Tok'ra bomb that blows up the moon and destroys Sokar's ship, killing Sokar with it. Apophis, however, escapes to rise again.
58	14	"Foothold"	Andy Mikita	Heather E. Ash	November 5, 1999
Stargate Command is under control by aliens originating from P3X-118. They use a frequency-based technology that allows them to mimic the appearance of other beings, i.e. humans. Carter must ask Colonel Maybourne to help her retake the base.
59	15	"Pretense"	David Warry-Smith	Katharyn Powers	January 19, 2000 (Sky One); January 21, 2000 (Showtime)
Skaara/Klorel crash lands on the Tollans' new homeworld Tollana and the Tollan invite SG-1 to represent Skaara in a trial to decide whether Skaara or Klorel has the right to use Skaara's body. Skaara wins. Lya of the Nox and SG-1 prevent a Goa'uld attack on Tollana.
60	16	"Urgo"	Peter DeLuise	Tor Alexander Valenza	January 26, 2000 (Sky One); January 28, 2000 (Showtime)
The members of SG-1 are implanted with an annoyingly extroverted AI named Urgo (Dom DeLuise). They manage to rectify the problem by visiting Urgo's creator on P4X-884, who implants Urgo in himself instead to improve his personality.
61	17	"A Hundred Days"	David Warry-Smith	Story by : V. C. James; Teleplay by : Brad Wright	February 14, 2000 (Sky One); February 4, 2000 (Showtime)
SG-1 visits Edora (P5C-768) just in time for a meteor shower caused by the planet passing through an asteroid field. Anticipating significant damage from meteorite impact, they attempt to evacuate the inhabitants. O'Neill is left behind while searching for stragglers. After the meteor shower, O'Neill cannot find the gate, which has been buried by a meteor strike. It takes Carter and Stargate Command 100 days to develop a means to reestablish contact, using a particle beam inspired by Sokar's attack on Earth in Serpent's Song.
62	18	"Shades of Grey"	Martin Wood	Jonathan Glassner	February 9, 2000 (Sky One); February 11, 2000 (Showtime)
After stealing technology from the Tollan, O'Neill is forced to retire. He joins a rogue SG team dedicated to obtaining advanced technology by any means and then store them on. However, O'Neill was actually on a secret mission as a double agent to find and capture the rogues. He also comes across the Tiernod, a cave-dwelling race on PX3-595 under the protection of the Asgard, who gave them invisibility devices to hide from predators.
63	19	"New Ground"	Chris McMullin	Heather E. Ash	February 16, 2000 (Sky One); February 18, 2000 (Showtime)
SG-1 visits a planet designated P2X-416 where the countries of Bedrosia and Optrica are in the middle of a war about the origin of life. The Bedrosians, who believe a Goa'uld created humans on their world, mistake SG-1 (minus Teal'c) for infiltrators and refuse to accept their account that the Stargate is a transportation device as the Optricans have always claimed. Teal'c frees his team with help from Nyan, one of a minority of Bedrosian scientists willing to approach the Optrican position with an open mind.
64	20	"Maternal Instinct"	Peter F. Woeste	Robert C. Cooper	February 25, 2000 (Sky One); February 25, 2000 (Showtime)
Daniel knows that the Harcesis is on a planet called Kheb; Bra'tac knows how to get there as it is the planet that the Jaffa believe to be the destination of their soul after death (P9C-292). They find a Zen monk who teaches Daniel about the ways of Ascension and an ascended being (Oma Desala) saves the child.
65	21	"Crystal Skull"	Brad Turner	Story by : Michael Greenburg & Jarrad Paul; Teleplay by : Brad Wright	March 3, 2000 (Sky One); March 3, 2000 (Showtime)
SG-1 finds a Mayan ziggurat in a lepton-rich environment on planet P7X-377; inside is a crystal skull that causes Daniel to be out of phase with our reality. Daniel's grandfather Nicholas Ballard found a similar skull in Belize and helps out. When they return to the planet, giant aliens who have vaguely humanoid but insubstantial forms, appear and return Daniel to normal.
66	22	"**Nemesis**"	Martin Wood	Robert C. Cooper	March 8, 2000 (Sky One); March 10, 2000 (Showtime)
Thor's starship has been infected by Replicators. In order to keep it from landing on Earth, SG-1 disables the deceleration engines so the ship burns up in the atmosphere and crashes in the Pacific. While they attempt escape to P3X-234, one replicator remains.

== Home releases ==
DVD name	Region 1	Region 2	Region 4
Stargate SG-1 Season 3	June 17, 2003	February 24, 2003	May 12, 2004
Volume 8	N/A	January 29, 2001	N/A
Volume 9	N/A	February 26, 2001	N/A
Volume 10	N/A	March 19, 2001	N/A
Volume 11	N/A	April 23, 2001	N/A
Volume 12	N/A	May 21, 2001	N/A
Volume 13	N/A	June 25, 2001	N/A
