= Children of the Gods =

- Stargate SG-1 episodes
- Episode nos.: Season 1 Episodes 1 & 2
- Directed by: Mario Azzopardi
- Written by: Jonathan Glassner; Brad Wright
- Cinematography by: Peter Woeste
- Editing by: Allan Lee
- Production codes: 101A, 101B
- Original air date: July 27, 1997
- Running time: 92 minutes

Guest appearances
- Jay Acovone as Charles Kawalsky; Vaitiare Bandera as Sha're; Robert Wisden as Major Samuels; Peter Williams as Apophis; Brent Stait as Louis Ferretti; Gary Jones as Chevron Guy; Alexis Cruz as Skaara

Episode chronology
← Previous —	Next → "The Enemy Within"
- Stargate SG-1 (season 1)

"Children of the Gods" is the first episode of the military science fiction television series Stargate SG-1. It was written by producers Jonathan Glassner and Brad Wright and was directed by Mario Azzopardi. The episode first aired on July 27, 1997, on Showtime. Originally presented as a television movie, the episode would later be split into two parts for repeats and syndicated viewings. A new updated cut entitled "Children of the Gods – The Final Cut" was released on DVD on July 21, 2009 by MGM Home Entertainment.

The story follows retired United States Air Force Colonel Jack O'Neill (portrayed by Richard Dean Anderson), who is recalled by General George Hammond (portrayed by Don S. Davis) to Stargate Command after it is attacked by an alien force. After being reunited with Dr. Daniel Jackson (portrayed by Michael Shanks), who has been living in secret on the alien world of Abydos, O'Neill and Captain Samantha Carter (portrayed by Amanda Tapping) learn that the Stargate network traverses the entire galaxy. After O'Neill, Carter, and Jackson discover where the attackers came from, the team travels to a new world where they encounter a race of beings posing as Gods called the Goa'uld and find an unlikely ally named Teal'c (portrayed by Christopher Judge).

Jonathan Glassner and Brad Wright developed the series to follow on from the events of the 1994 film by Dean Devlin and Roland Emmerich, incorporating a number of elements such as settings and characters. The pilot was filmed in and around Vancouver, British Columbia and had a budget of $7.5 million. While the episode originally received mixed reviews, it gained a sizable following that would lead to the show lasting for 10 seasons with 214 episodes as well as various spinoff shows.

== Background ==
One year previously, as depicted in the movie Stargate, Colonel Jack O'Neill (originally spelled O'Neil, portrayed by Kurt Russell) led a team through the Stargate to the planet Abydos, tasked with destroying any potential threat to Earth. After killing the Goa'uld System Lord Ra with a nuclear bomb, O'Neill returned to Earth with two survivors of his team, Charles Kawalsky (originally portrayed by John Diehl) and Louis Ferretti (originally portrayed by French Stewart). They leave behind Dr. Daniel Jackson (originally portrayed by James Spader) with his new love Sha're (originally spelled Sha'uri, portrayed by Mili Avital) and her brother Skaara (portrayed by Alexis Cruz), falsely reporting that Dr. Jackson was killed on the mission along with the inhabitants of Abydos.

== Plot ==
At Stargate Command in the Cheyenne Mountain Complex, five United States Air Force airmen play poker in front of a dormant covered Stargate, justifying their laid-back conduct as Stargate Command being a dead-end assignment with dwindling personnel. Airman Carol Weterings (Rachel Hayward), the only member of the group to raise concerns, notices the room shaking and investigates the Stargate, which suddenly activates. Warriors in metal armour with serpent helmets (Jaffa) appear through the gate and grab Weterings. Teal'c (Christopher Judge) presents her to their leader (the Goa'uld Apophis) to examine, before ordering his men to open fire, killing the other airmen. A quick reaction force led by Major General George Hammond (Don S. Davis) arrives to witness the Jaffa leaving with Weterings through the Stargate. Jack O'Neill (Richard Dean Anderson) is brought to Cheyenne Mountain where he is questioned along with his former teammates Charles Kawalsky (Jay Acovone) and Louis Ferretti (Brent Stait) about his first mission through the Stargate to Abydos.

With O'Neill unwilling to give any more information than what was already on their mission reports, Hammond believes the only response is to send a nuclear bomb through the Stargate to Abydos, to eliminate the threat. O'Neill reveals he lied about using the bomb to destroy Abydos and that although the alien Ra was killed, the people of Abydos are still alive and Dr. Daniel Jackson (Michael Shanks) is living among them. O'Neill convinces Hammond to let him communicate with Jackson by sending a box of tissues through to Abydos, which is promptly returned with a request to "send more" by Jackson, proving he is still alive. Hammond reinstates O'Neill to active duty and orders him to return to Abydos to investigate where the alien invaders came from. A team is assembled with O'Neill commanding, along with Kawalsky, Ferretti, and Captain/Dr. Samantha Carter (Amanda Tapping). When they step through the Stargate, they find a group of Abydonians waiting for them, armed with military weapons from Earth.

After being reunited with Jackson, Skaara (Alexis Cruz), and Jackson's spouse Sha're (Vaitiare Bandera), O'Neill, Kawalsky, and Carter are led by Jackson to a large cavernous room, filled with what he believes to be coordinates of a vast network of Stargates across the entire galaxy. While O'Neill and the others are away, the same Jaffa team arrives through Abydos Stargate, kidnapping Skaara and Sha're, severely injuring Ferretti, and killing several civilians. After returning to Earth, and learning that the Stargate can go to other worlds, nine teams are put together, including SG-1, led by O'Neill with Carter his second-in-command and Jackson, who is determined to find Sha're, accompanying him. Kawalsky is given command of SG-2. Ferretti is able to recall the coordinates entered by the enemy troops on the Stargate, and the two teams head through the Stargate once more.

Meanwhile, Jackson's wife Sha're is selected as host to a Goa'uld, Amonet, the Queen of Apophis. After coming through the Stargate, SG-1 encounters a group of monks who escort them to a town of Chulak where they encounter Apophis and the now possessed Sha're, before being captured. In prison, O'Neill, Carter, and Jackson find Skaara and are confronted by the enemy soldier Teal'c, who has noticed their technology. Skaara is selected to become a host and Teal'c is ordered to execute the remaining prisoners, but O'Neill, noticing Teal'c's hesitancy, convinces him to help them escape.

O'Neill, Carter, Jackson, and Teal'c lead the prisoners toward the Stargate but are pinned down by two Goa'uld death gliders from above. O'Neill and Teal'c manage to damage one before being rescued by SG-2, who destroy the other. As team and liberated prisoners reach the Stargate, they are once again met by a possessed Skaara, who departs through the Stargate. Daniel rushes to open the Stargate back to Earth as the team defends against a battalion of attacking Jaffa. As they retreat through the Stargate to Earth, Kawalsky is invaded by an infant Goa'uld.

Safely home on Earth, Jackson and O'Neill reaffirm their determination to find Sha're and Skaara and rescue them. O'Neill asks General Hammond to make Teal'c a member of their team, but the General says it is not his decision. As everyone leaves the gate room, Kawalsky's eyes glow like a Goa'uld.

== Production ==
=== Development ===
After learning MGM were looking to develop a show based upon the 1994 film, Stargate, Jonathan Glassner and Brad Wright - who worked on science fiction series The Outer Limits together - both individually pursued the project. At the time, Glassner who was living and working out of Vancouver, Canada, was keen to move back home to Los Angeles in the United States. Keen to keep Glassner with MGM in Vancouver, Glassner told them that he would only stay if they gave him Stargate. Some weeks later, Glassner and Wright were paired to develop the series together. Pitching to MGM and Showtime, they imagined the Stargate being run in a similar way to the NASA program, with teams going out and exploring. Keen to avoid comparisons to Star Trek, Stargate was set in the present day, not the future, with the teams going through the gate being outgunned and outmatched by the other races they encounter.

As part of developing both the series and writing the first episode, Glassner and Wright spent three months studying the original feature film, as well as any books, notes and scripts they could acquire to help them in developing the universe which their show would inhabit. Upset that MGM were developing a series and not sequels to their film, the original creators of the film Dean Devlin and Roland Emmerich were unwilling to talk to Glassner and Wright.

Glassner and Wright completed their first draft of the pilot on October 18, 1996. Whilst many elements remain the same or similar in the completed script, the earlier draft had a number of key differences. Dr. Samantha Clayman, who was later re-imagined as Captain Samantha Carter, was penned by the duo as a theoretical astrophysicist, with a disdain for the military despite being a Lieutenant in the U.S. Air Force. The more abrasively imagined character also didn't warm to the other characters, including Dr. Jackson.

Continuing the feature film's use of Ancient Egyptian deities, Apep, the serpent "Lord of Chaos" was imagined as the pilot's antagonist before settling on his alternative name of Apophis. The early draft had Apep cradling the Goa'uld symbiote from a fallen soldier, whilst his world of Chulak was conceived as being covered in snow. The Stargate Facility on Earth also had some differences, with Glassner and Wright imagining giant concrete doors shutting in front of the gate to stop unwanted visitors. Towards the pilot's climax, a Goa'uld symbiote attaches itself to a member of SG2, Corporal Warren, making its way back to Earth before being discovered and destroyed by O'Neill. This was later reshaped into SG2 leader Major Kawalsky's being taken as a host by a Goa'uld symbiote at the end of the pilot. The writers' main goals when writing the pilot were to bring O'Neill out of retirement, Jackson back to Earth, and introduce the Stargate as a way of going all over the galaxy.

=== Cast ===
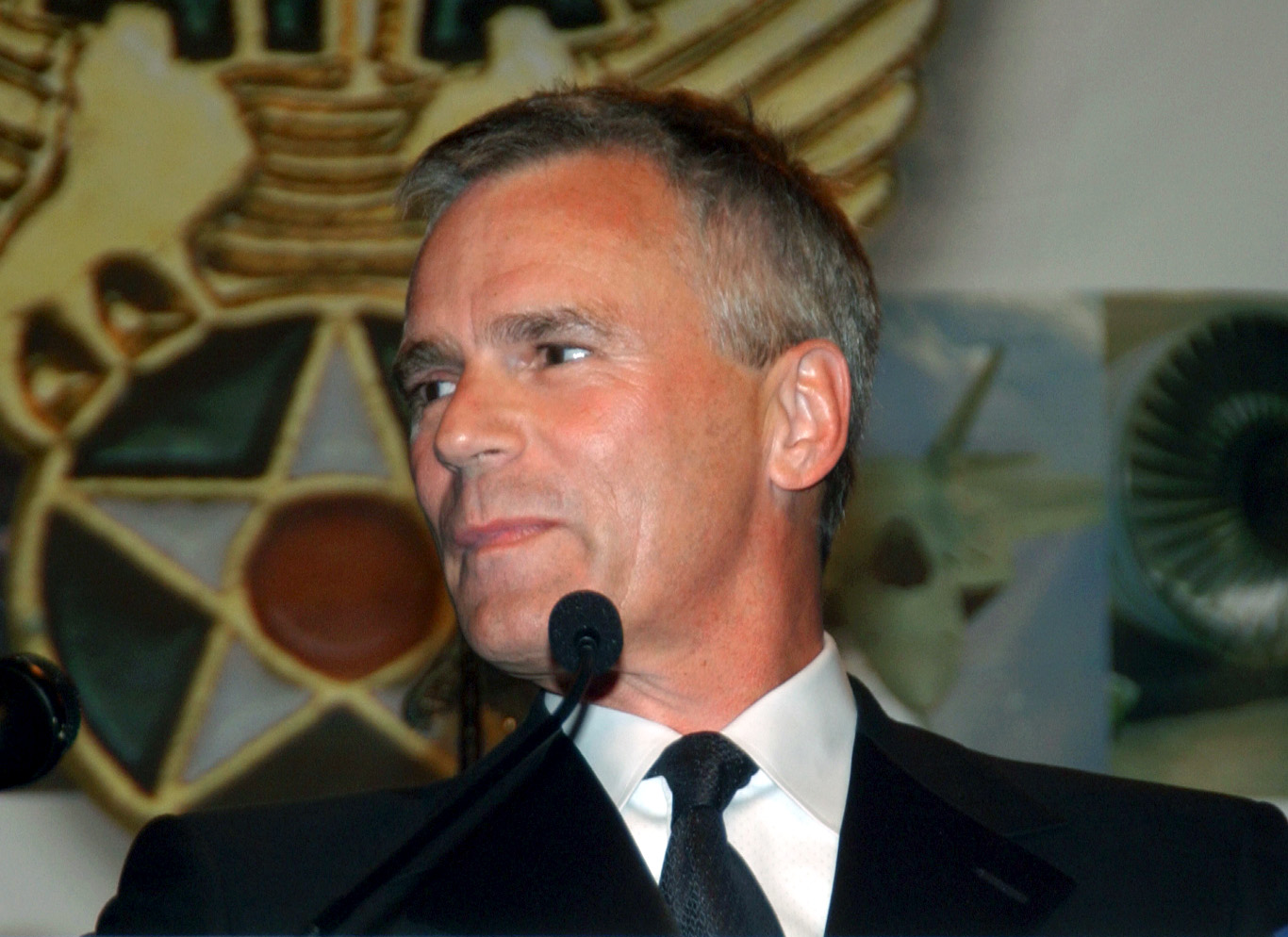
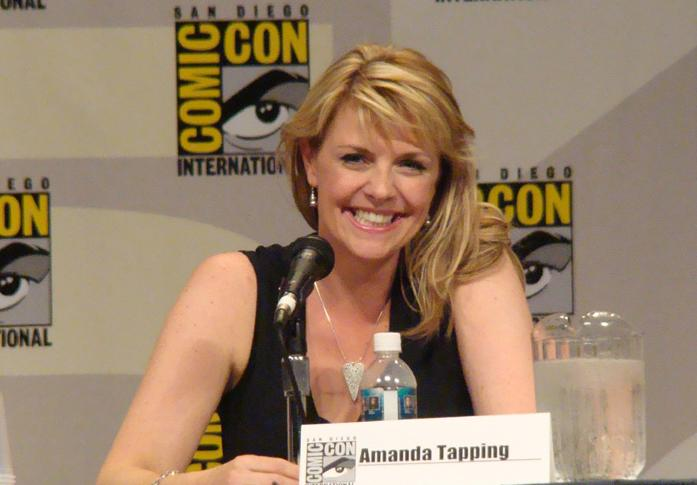
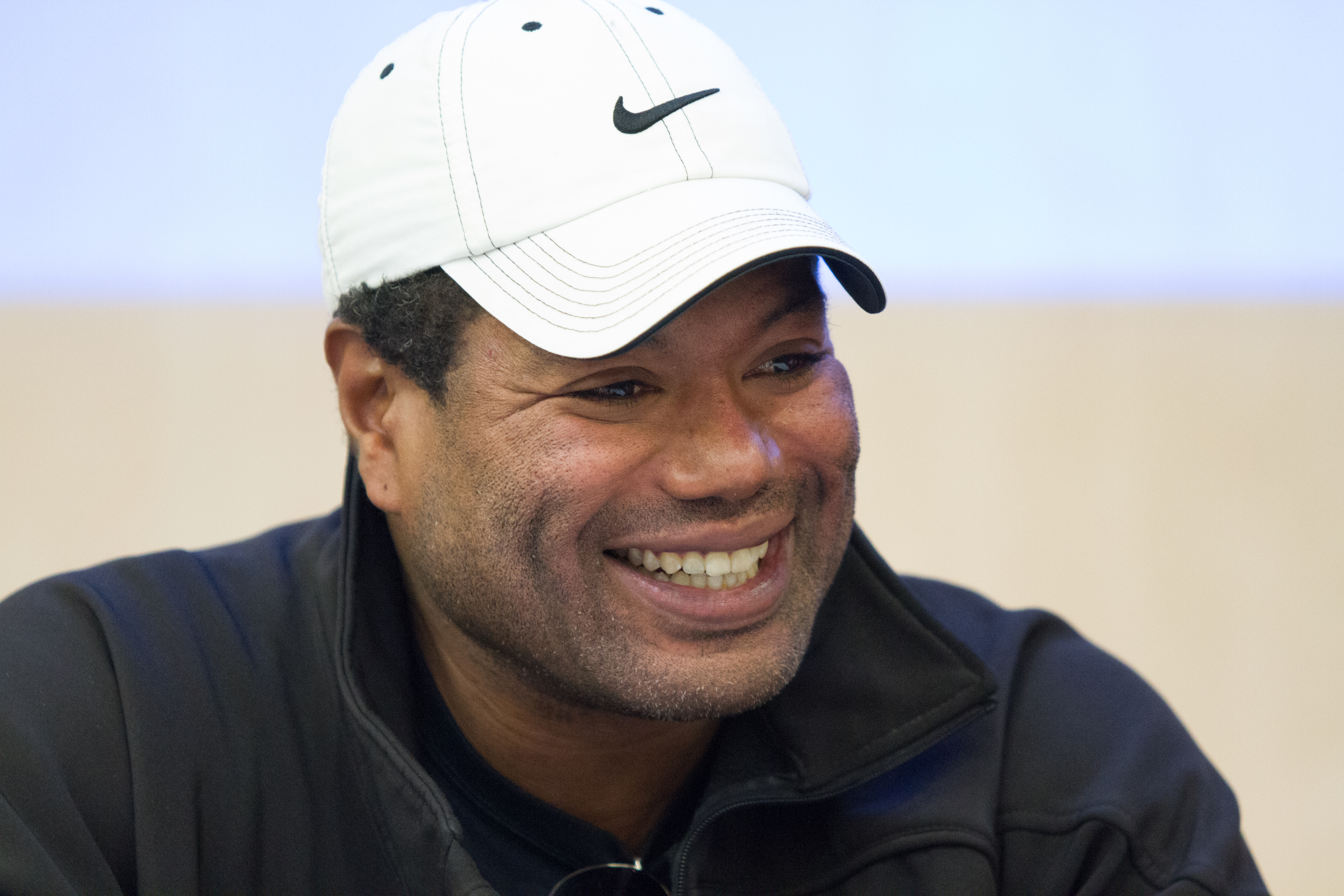
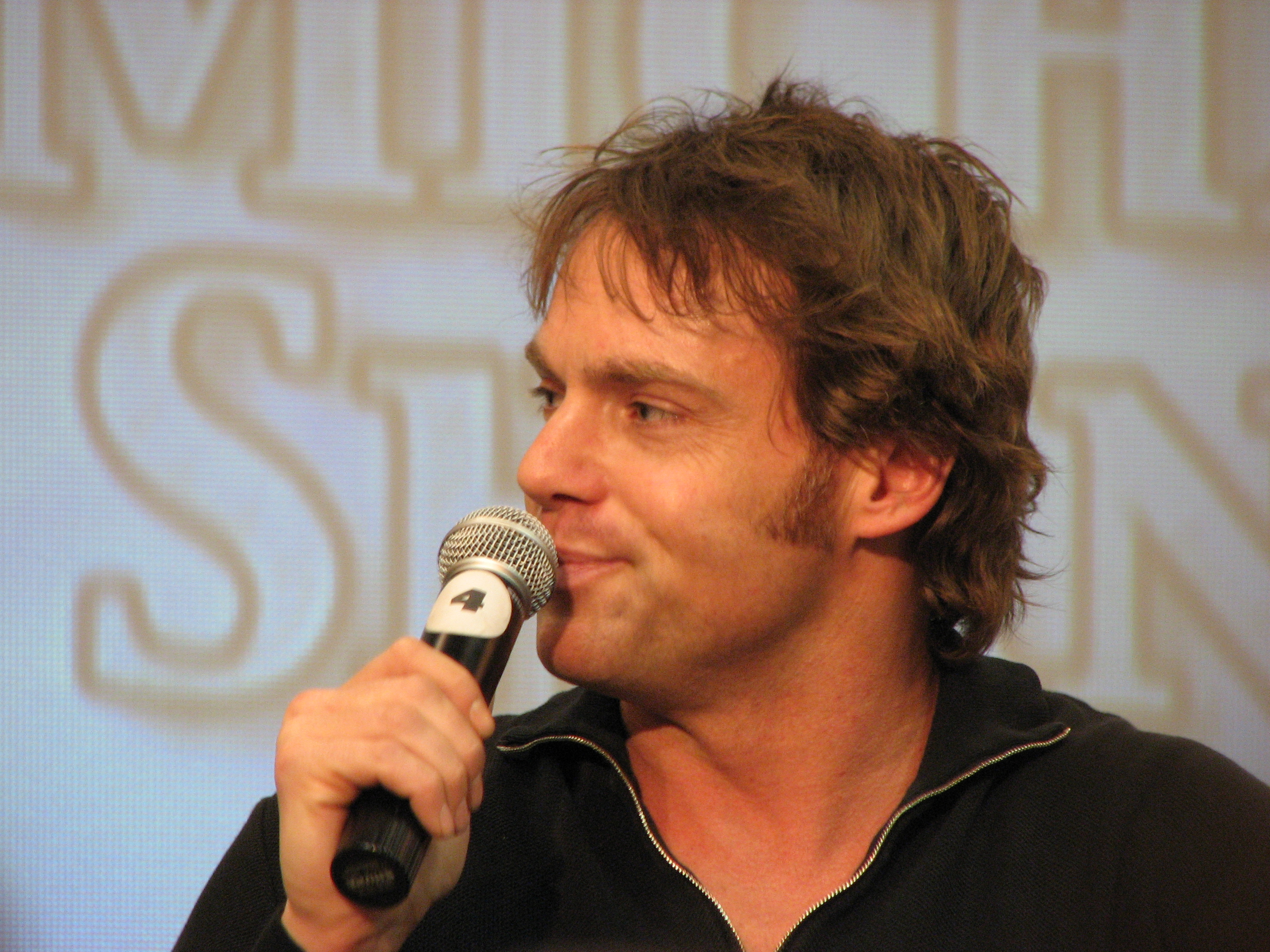
The four principal actors of Stargate SG-1, Richard Dean Anderson (Jack O'Neill), Amanda Tapping (Samantha Carter), Christopher Judge (Teal'c) and Michael Shanks (Daniel Jackson).

John Symes, the president of MGM, had a relationship with Richard Dean Anderson and his producing partner Michael Greenburg and suggested that Anderson take over the role of Colonel Jack O'Neill. Believing he would be unable to portray the strict, humourless military officer that Kurt Russell had depicted in the feature film, Anderson initially declined the offer until he was told that the show had already been given a 44 episode commitment and that he would be given ample leeway to shift the character away from Russell's version.

For recasting Daniel Jackson, the team viewed auditions for around 500 actors, before narrowing it down to just 3 who were all very different. Michael Shanks, who was finishing his second year at Stratford Shakespeare Festival in Toronto, submitted a video audition before being flown to Los Angeles, with Shanks recalling that he "must have tested for everybody at MGM and Showtime". Shanks got on well with Richard Dean Anderson during the process, and Glassner had a hunch that whilst Shanks appeared nervous, he would be able to bring wit and a sense of humour to the role.

As well as bringing back O'Neill and Jackson from the film, Wright was adamant they introduce new characters, including a strong female character that would end up being Samantha Carter. An Air Force Captain and theoretical astrophysicist, Carter had been written as a "hardass", so when Tapping auditioned, she decided to try to bring a sense of humour as well as more warmth and levity to the characters—even though it wasn't written that way. In the casting process, the studio executives were predominantly interested in casting an actress based upon her physical attributes, with Glassner recalling that the studio "wanted this other woman who was sort of the cliché hot woman who didn't come across as very bright", whilst Wright and Glassner wanted Tapping for the role. It wasn't until just two weeks before filming the pilot commenced that Tapping was finally given the role.

The part of Teal'c was conceptualised as a way of introducing the Goa'uld and Jaffa elements of the show's story. As Teal'c was an alien, Glassner wanted the actor to look "somewhat unique" and have a "strong, intimidating presence". Christopher Judge first learnt of the part from a friend's roommate, who was also reading for the part and told his agent he would leave their agency unless they got him an audition for the role. Upon first glance of the script, Judge assumed it was going to "yet another example of where the big, tough black guy is your stereotypical reformed slave", but upon reading it properly he realised that there was the chance to let "'the guy with the muscle' be the one who might just lead his people away from slavery". When Judge entered the room to audition, Wright turned to Glassner and said "ok - that's him", to which Glassner whispered "please God, let him be able to act". Judge, who had longer hair at the time, was asked to go bald for the role.

The role of General Hammond was originally imagined by Wright and Glassner as a black American man, resembling politician, diplomat, and United States Army four-star general Colin Powell. When Anderson and Greenburg came onboard they brought Don S. Davis in to audition, having worked with him on Macgyver. Shooting the pilot, director Mario Azzopardi wanted Davis to portray the character as a stereotypical military general, with Davis calling Hammond "by-the-book" and a "foil for O'Neill", believing the character to be two-dimensional and a poor representation of what the United States military was really like. Davis, having served in the United States Army during the Vietnam War criticized Azzopardi's "limited imagination", and as the show progressed successfully encouraged Wright and Glassner to write his character to be a more well-rounded, better representation of a military general.

The role of the antagonist, Apophis, was filled by Peter Williams. Williams had originally auditioned for the part of Teal'c. Williams cut his dreadlocked hair off for the role, with Azzopardi suggesting that Williams look at people with delusions of grandeur for research, with Williams using Benito Mussolini as a template. Sha're (originally spelled Sha'uri) was another character taken from the feature film. Vaitiare Bandera, who had been unsuccessful auditioning for the role as the character in the feature film was cast in the pilot. Bandera agreed to a topless scene, but this was changed during post to use full-frontal nude shoots. A reluctant Bandera was talked into agreeing after the scenes were slightly shortened. The producers had approached John Diehl, who originally portrayed Lieutenant Kawalsky in the feature film, to reprise his role, under the direction that Diehl would only return for 2 episodes. Diehl then decided he no longer wanted the part and it was recast to Jay Acovone. Although Acovone was open to playing the part for longer, the scripts for the first part of the season had already been completed. The producers also approached Alexis Cruz, who originally portrayed Ska'ra in the feature film and asked if he would take on a recurring role in the series. Cruz was interested but did not wish to be tied to a series, so the producers brought the character back in a smaller capacity.

Major Samuels, portrayed by Robert Wisden, would reoccur a number of times over the course of the show, as would actor Gary Jones, portraying a character simply credited as "Technician". This character would eventually be named Walter, appearing in over 100 episodes.

=== Filming ===
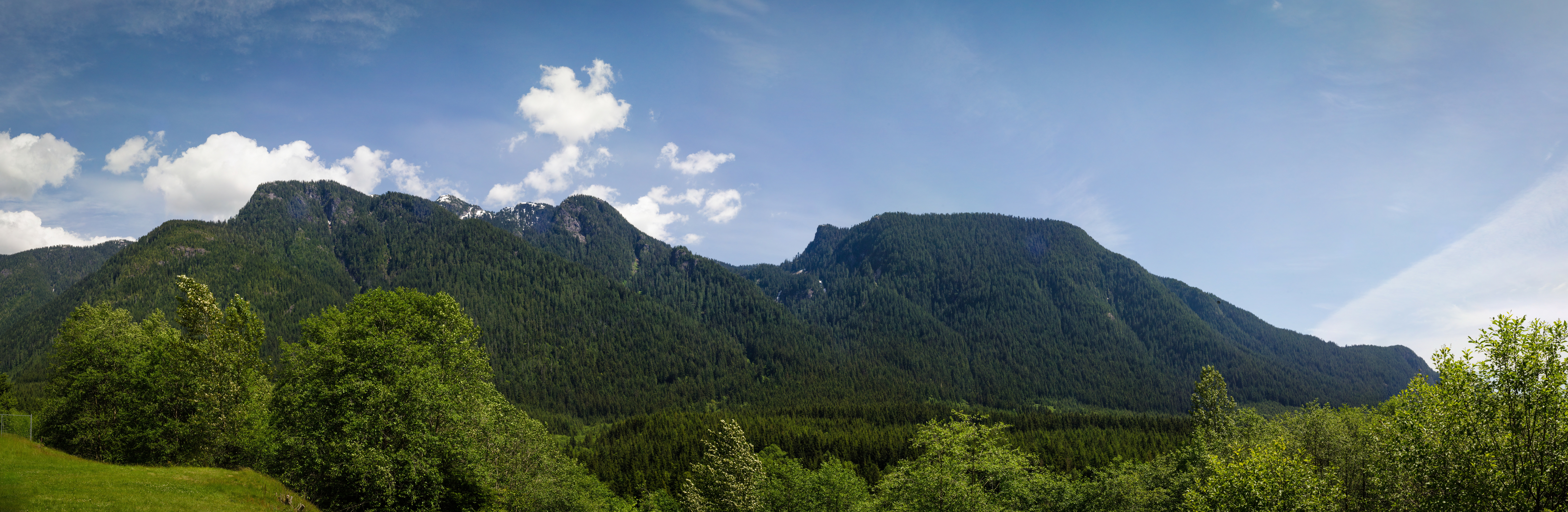
Mid-Valley Viewpoint at the Lower Seymour Conservation Reserve served as one as the locations used for the alien world of Chulak.

Filming commenced on February 18, 1997, running for a total of 24 days, wrapping up in mid-March 1997. The episode was directed by Mario Azzopardi, who would go on to direct four more episodes of the series, as well as directing four episodes of the spin-off series Stargate Atlantis. Andy Mikita was the first assistant director and would go direct 29 episodes of SG-1, as well as directing for spin-offs Stargate Atlantis and Stargate Universe. The episode was shot on 16 mm film.

The North Shore Mountains in Vancouver, British Columbia, Canada served as backdrop for the alien world of Chulak, with production taking place at Mid-Valley Viewpoint. The first days of shooting on location were particularly tough for the production due to heavy wind and rain. Conditions were so tough, many of the cast and crew wondered if this was indicative of what working on the show was going to be like, with writer and producer Jonathan Glassner initially wondering if the series was jinxed. Amongst the problems caused by the adverse weather was the entire first day's film being scratched, to the point it was mostly unusable. The noise generated by the wind and rain meant that dialog was at times entirely inaudible, with many cast members struggling to deliver their lines due to coldness—notably Christopher Judge who at times was unable to maintain the deep imposing voice of his character, Teal'c. Many of the costumes worn by extras were soaking wet and covered in mud as the day went on.

Problems continued over the following days as production moved to filming the teams escape the prison on Chulak. As the scene required the seamless transition of the characters escaping out of the prison and into the surrounding alien forest, production opted not to construct the prison on a soundstage, but rather to build the set on location, in the mountains. The weather caused the set to keep blowing over, and eventually production staff were enlisted to physically hold the walls in place during shooting, to stop the set collapsing. Another issue, as noted by writer and producer Brad Wright, was that the set was so big, they didn't have enough background actors to adequately fill it. Instead, just prior to shooting they had to move the walls to make the room smaller.

The Stargate Command set was to be built on Stages 5 and 6 at The Bridge Studios in Vancouver, however the buildings were still under construction and would not be complete in time for filming the pilot. As a result, production designer Richard Hudolin and construction coordinator Thom Wells designed and built the Stargate Command set in the effects stage at Bridge Studio, where it stayed for the pilot and subsequent episode "The Enemy Within", before being taken apart at the end of February 1997 and moved to its permanent home.

Offscreen, over the course of filming the pilot, Amanda Tapping, Michael Shanks, and Christopher Judge, who had all relocated to Vancouver for the show, were all staying in the same hotel and would spend the vast majority of their time together after work. The three actors would go on to attribute their great on-screen chemistry to the relationship and familiarity they were able to establish whilst making the pilot.

=== Post production and effects ===
Over 240 special effects were featured in the original cut of the pilot, with the post-production team working from when filming wrapped in March all the way through until July before the premiere. A mixture of practical and computer effects were used in the pilot. Matte paintings were used as backdrops and to extend locations, such as the Abydos Pyramid, which was based upon the feature film and re-created by Kent Matheson.

A miniature model death glider, based around a similar craft from the feature film, was used for the film's climax. The model was created from Styrofoam and shot using a motion control rig by John Gajdecki's visual effects team, mostly out his own studio in Toronto.

The Stargate effect itself was shot as production for the pilot and would be reused throughout the series to save money. What was known as the kawoosh effect was shot in a similar fashion to the feature film, although due to budget constraints when the gate opens it would not recede into an introverted cone behind the Stargate as it did in the feature. The effect was created by firing an air canon into a 5'×5'×5' tank of water, with some Sapphire Sparks to add glows.

Michelle Comens, who originally worked on the pilot as a coordinator, oversaw the updates for the visual effects as part of the 2009 Final Cut. This included supplementing Death Glider sequence from the end of the pilot with new computer-generated imagery, including a second Death Glider and adding a Cargo Ship, retconning the Death Glider from being used as a transport (which had only been done in the pilot). New scenic shots for the alien planets of Abydos & Chulak were also created.

=== Musical score ===
Joel Goldsmith, who had previously worked with Brad Wright and Johnathan Glassner on their series The Outer Limits, was hired to score the series, with Rick Chadock editing. Early in production, Goldsmith opened a dialog with David Arnold, composer of the 1994 film Stargate, as he looked to incorporate the main theme from the film, as well as draw and expand upon some of the other cues.

Whilst all subsequent episodes of Stargate SG-1 would be scored with an electronic orchestra, Goldsmith utilized an orchestra to bring his score to life. Goldsmith worked on the score at his own private studio, Goldmore Studio in Sun Valley, Los Angeles, with Rick Chadock producing.

Despite resistance from Brad Wright and Joel Goldsmith, during post-production, executives at MGM and Showtime made the decision to use David Arnold's score from the 1994 film more extensively, both in-place and in some cases directly on top of Goldsmith's score. Alex Wilkinson's music editing on the pilot was nominated for a Golden Reel Award.

If we're going to go back to the beginning let's go and re-release "Children of the Gods" without that mash-up score between David Arnold's theatrical release and Joel Goldsmith's original score for us, which I thought was beautiful, and we basically got talked out of using by bosses at MGM

— Brad Wright discussing revisiting "Children of the Gods" and Joel Goldsmith's score

The interlaced mix combining both Goldsmith and Arnold's score which was used in the pilot was later released as a CD soundtrack on November 25, 1997, through Milan Records. Arnold and Goldsmith were so dissatisfied with the score that they both took their names off of it, with Goldsmith calling it "horrible", affirming it had been made against their wishes.

In 2009, one of Brad Wright's main motivations for revisiting "Children of the Gods" was his dissatisfaction with how the score had been presented. Wright convinced MGM that as part of the new version, they should cut David Arnold's film score and instead restore Joel Goldsmith's music, around 40 minutes of which had never properly been used or even heard. Wright's new cut had both different pacing, with some scenes reordered, entirely new or completely cut, which required Goldsmith to slightly rework his score and create new cues.

On March 26, 2018, Dragon's Domain Records released Stargate SG-1: Children of the Gods - The Final Cut - Original Soundtrack by Joel Goldsmith. Goldsmith, who died in 2012, had first discussed releasing the score from "Children of the Gods" when the Final Cut was released in 2009. The score was mastered by James Nelson, with the CD set accompanied by a booklet of liner notes by series co-creator Brad Wright.

Stargate SG-1: Children of the Gods - The Final Cut - Original Soundtrack by Joel Goldsmith
No.	Title	Length
1.	"Stargate SG-1: Main Title"	1:02
2.	"Opening Titles / Goa'uld Attack / Opening Titles Pt.2 / Opening Credits Pt. 3"	6:33
3.	"They Glowed / O'Neil Spills The Beans"	2:55
4.	"Remember Skaara / Tissue Box Message"	3:08
5.	"Return Message"	1:15
6.	"Return to Abydos / Hello Jack"	3:39
7.	"Evening Meal / Rejection and Death"	6:38
8.	"Attack & Abduction / Return to Earth"	8:20
9.	"Goa'uld Dungeon"	1:37
10.	"Daniel and Jack / Trading Stories"	2:41
11.	"SG-1 Rescue Mission"	2:25
12.	"Symbiote Transfer"	2:57
13.	"On The Trail"	1:55
14.	"Chulak"	2:26
15.	"The New Queen"	1:20
16.	"Where Are You From? / Hell Freezes Over / Five Hours"	1:58
17.	"The Choosing / Teal'c's Choice / Escape to Earth/ Finale"	19:21
18.	"End Titles"	1:59
19.	"Stargate SG-1: End Credits"	0:58

== Release ==
A month before the premiere, MGM and Showtime launched stargatesg-1.com, offering fans their first look at the show and the characters. A novelisation of the episode was written by Ashley McConnell and published by Channel 4 Books in 1999.

=== Broadcast ===
"Children of the Gods" was first shown in its entirety on Showtime on July 27, 1997, and was followed by a 20-minute featurette called "The Stargate Saga", which contained interviews, behind the scenes footage and previews of the upcoming season. The pilot received Showtime's highest-ever ratings for a series premiere with an audience of approximately 1.5 million households in the 8 p.m. Sunday slot, whilst also boasting as the highest-rated original movie shown on Showtime since 1994. In the UK, the episode was first shown on Sky One on April 8, 1998, before later being shown on Channel 4 in August 1999.

=== Home media ===
Both parts of "Children of the Gods" were released on Laserdisc & VHS in 1998. "Children of the Gods" along with the subsequent episodes "The Enemy Within" and "Emancipation" were made available to purchase on DVD in 2000. These were presented in 16:9 aspect ratio, as opposed to the 4:3 ratio they were broadcast in. As the episode featured full-frontal nudity during the scene showing the possession of Sha're (Vaitiare Bandera) by Amonet, it was rated R by the MPAA. It is also rated 18 by the BBFC, the only such episode with the certificate.

In May 2008, it was revealed an updated version of "Children of the Gods" was in development. The new version was the "pet project" of series co-creator Brad Wright. Wright was motivated after learning that MGM were keen to revisit dailies from the 10 years of SG-1 to put together blooper reels. Wright countered that he would instead want to revisit the pilot to restore Joel Goldsmith's unreleased original score, originally imagining simply using a 1080p upscale of the original cut. As this developed, Wright secured more interest and funding from MGM, allowing him to revisit the original film dailies.

Longtime SG-1 editor Brad Rines was brought on board to work on the new cut with Wright. In conjunction with revisiting dailies, $35,000 was spent on repairing the scratch that had been sustained to the film on the first day of shooting. Repairing the damaged footage, as well as no longer being restricted by having to present the show in 4:3 aspect ratio with the option of 16:9, as the 1997 cut had been, opened the project up to takes that Wright felt were in some cases better aesthetically and in the actors' performances.

The new edit introduced scenes that did not make the original cut, as well as trimmed, moved, and in some cases entirely cut some scenes. Among the changes was the possession of Sha're, which whilst still present in episode, the nude shots of Vaitiare Bandera were removed. Scenes involving Apophis' harem of women were cut as were some scenes between General Hammond & Major Samuels. The possession of Major Kawalsky which sets up the subsequent episode "The Enemy Within" was also removed. A beat to explain how Apophis left Stargate Command on Earth, a question which Wright had frequently been asked was added in, along with additional exposition and character moments. Michael Shanks, Amanda Tapping and Peter Williams were among the cast members who were asked to provide automated dialogue replacement, whilst Christopher Judge re-recorded all of his dialog. During the process, Wright deliberated using scenes from a season 5 episode, "Threshold" which has scenes that overlap with "Children of the Gods" and further Teal'c's decision to turn against the Goa'uld, however Wright ultimately decided it wasn't necessary.

On July 21, 2009 "Children of the Gods - The Final Cut" was released as a standalone DVD. The release included Richard Dean Anderson's first ever DVD commentary, along with a 7-minute "Back to the Beginning" featurette detailing the changes made by Wright.

The original cut of "Children of the Gods", along with the rest of season 1 was first made available to download in January 2008 on iTunes and Amazon Unbox.

== Reception ==
=== Critical response ===
Reaction to the pilot was mixed. Starburst praised the episode, writing "this is smart, witty and spectacular Sci-Fi, in which the cast find their feet instantly, and the FX crew create some stunning visuals". Writing for Science Fiction Weekly, Kathie Huddleston positively received the episode, writing "Stargate was a fun B movie. Stargate SG-1 looks to be a fun, blast-'em-up, B television series". Huddleston praised Wright and Glassner for remaining faithful to the original feature film, highlighting the action and special effects, although did call out the fact that Ra's people (the Goa'uld) could now speak English as being "A little harder to swallow". Discussing the cast, the reviewer commented that Richard Dean Anderson "doesn't waste time trying to do an imitation of Russell", whilst calling Michael Shank's portrayal of Dr. Daniel Jackson "fairly good take on Spader's original characterization". Huddleston felt that Amanda Tapping's Capt. Samantha Carter "seems a bit out of place as the writers try to create sexual tension between her and Anderson (not terribly successfully at this stage)". Brian Gray for UGO Networks called "Children of the Gods" "a pilot that is worthy of theatrical release, with as much action and bravado as any feature."

Variety reviewer Tony Scott criticized that "superficial characters wander through their roles without stirring a modicum of conviction". He mocked that the wooden acting, "pedestrian writing, pulp-mag plotting, shopworn characters, hackneyed dialogue [...] and Mario Azzopardi's broad direction will all undoubtedly delight billions and billions". He predicted that the series is "essentially for young people", and that "if no one else, the kiddies are probably watching" but that it didn't stop the producers from "blatantly showcasing naked young women". Criticism of the full-frontal nudity was echoed by other outlets, with Scott Pierce for Deseret News asserting "it's the sort of scene we've seen in countless sci-fi shows before - and having the actress disrobe is nothing but pure exploitation. You know, the sort of thing we've come to expect from Showtime". Pierce also criticised the episodes plot for being "extremely similar" to the feature film, although did believe that audiences might be "pleasantly surprised". Will Joyner from The New York Times considered Stargate SG-1 as a "challenging, if derivative, mix" that is "more than a Stargate [feature film] fan might expect but certainly less than one would hope for". His opinion about the main cast was mixed, and he found it disturbing that SG-1 used shock tactics to make up for its lower television budget. He would not recommend the show for children because of the "grotesque physical attributes in the new villains" and the "gratuitous use of sexual implication and nudity". The episode got a Nielsen rating of 3.3 / 3.4, -4.

=== Retrospective and Final Cut reviews ===
Writing for IGN, R.L. Shaffer praised what he believed to be an "extravagant, fun and surprisingly amusing, but very cheap-looking film" and whilst he was critical of the shows sets and production, he attributed the cast's performances to the ultimate longevity of the show. Reviewing the Final Cut, PopMatters writer Dan Heaton noted that the episode displayed writers Brad Wright and Jonathan Glassner still deciding whether they were going to move the show in a more adult, creepy or clever, family-fun direction, resulting in an unclear dominant tone in the pilot. Heaton believed the pilot had been strengthened through many of the changes, including using Goldsmith's score and updates to some of the CGI, although was singled out the new Abydos Pyramid shots as looking "too much like a video game".

In 2013 WhatCulture Joe Julians was complimentary of the episode, believing that the casting of Richard Dean Anderson and Michael Shanks made Kurt Russell and James Spader "almost instantly forgotten", enjoying the humour that Anderson injected into the character. Julians also felt that whilst Samantha Carter goes on to be a "great character", he felt that the writing in the pilot made her come across as "entitled". The episode was ranked at number 19 out of 25, in a feature listing the series best episodes on Den of Geek. Writing for Comet in 2018, Kieran Dickson awarded the episode the number 1 spot on his Top 10 episodes of Stargate SG-1.

In the pilot, Carter was this hard-assed feminist with a didactic message and I was violently opposed to her being portrayed that way. In fact, when I first read it I said 'Oh no - don't make me say this - women don't talk like this.'

— Amanda Tapping discussing her dialog in "Children of the Gods".

The shows creators and cast have criticised and gone onto parody some of the dialog from the episode. Amanda Tapping was particularly critical of how her character Samantha Carter was written in the episode, feeling that the dialog was not reflective of how women really speak. Tapping successfully encouraged Wright and Glassner to reconsider the way they wrote Carter in the series. One of the most notorious lines "just because my reproductive organs are on the inside instead of the outside doesn't mean I can't handle whatever you can handle" from Carter's original introduction to the show was frequently mocked by the shows creators, and was even parodied in the season 8 episode "Moebius". Ultimately, Wright was so dissatisfied with the line he cut it from the Final Cut version. Prior to airing the episode, Wright was called out on the decision to include nudity, which he justified by stating it was integral to the story. Glassner and Wright both later acknowledged that it was Showtime that pushed for the scenes, believing it would help ratings and that it had no place in what was otherwise a family show.
