= Stargate SG-1 season 2 =

Season of television series

Stargate SG-1
- Season 2
- DVD cover
- Starring: Richard Dean Anderson; Michael Shanks; Amanda Tapping; Christopher Judge; Don S. Davis
- No. of episodes: 22

Release
- Original network: Showtime
- Original release: June 26, 1998 – February 10, 1999

Season chronology
- ← Previous; Season 1 Next → Season 3

The second season of Stargate SG-1, an American-Canadian television series, began airing on June 26, 1998, on Showtime. The second season concluded after 22 episodes on February 10, 1999, on British Sky One, which overtook Showtime in mid-season. The series was developed by Brad Wright and Jonathan Glassner, who also served as executive producers. Season two regular cast members include Richard Dean Anderson, Michael Shanks, Amanda Tapping, with Christopher Judge, and Don S. Davis.

== Production ==
Vaitiare Bandera, who plays Sha're, was actually pregnant with Michael Shanks' child during the filming of "Secrets". Following the events in the episode "A Matter of Time", Sally Malcolm would write two books, A Matter of Honor and The Cost of Honor, that detail SG-1's attempts to save SG-10 from the planet. The late Season 2 episode "Serpent's Song" was the first SG-1 episode that was directed by Peter DeLuise. He would go on to direct more episodes than any other director involved with the series, even passing Martin Wood, who began directing in Season 1. "Out Of Mind" was the second time a clip show has been used, the first being Season 1 episode "Politics".

== Release and reception ==
"Holiday" gained a 4.2 rating on the Nielsen ratings, making it Stargate SG-1's strongest episode in its ten-season run. Stargate SG-1 was nominated for a Saturn Award in the category "Best Genre Cable/Syndicated Series". Richard Dean Anderson was honored with a Saturn Award for "Best Genre TV Actor". Daria Ellerman was nominated for a Gemini Award for "Best Picture Editing in a Dramatic Program or Series". The episode "Holiday" was nominated for a Gemini in the category "Best Achievement in Make-Up".

== Main cast ==
- Starring Richard Dean Anderson as Colonel Jack O'Neill
- Michael Shanks as Dr. Daniel Jackson
- Amanda Tapping as Captain Samantha Carter
- With Christopher Judge as Teal'c
- And Don S. Davis as Major General George Hammond

The second season is the only one in which all five members of the original cast appear in every episode.

== Episodes ==
Episodes in bold are continuous episodes, where the story spans over 2 or more episodes.

No. overall	No. in season	Title	Directed by	Written by	Original release date
23	1	"**The Serpent's Lair**"	Jonathan Glassner	Brad Wright	June 26, 1998
Teal'c's former mentor Bra'tac joins their fight and together they embark on a mission of planting bombs to destroy Apophis' ship and halt the attack on Earth. Eventually they destroy the two ships and escape in Death Gliders.
24	2	"In the Line of Duty"	Martin Wood	Robert C. Cooper	July 3, 1998
When the planet Nassya (P3X-382) falls under attack by the Goa'uld, Carter is possessed by a Goa'uld. When the Goa'uld is discovered, she claims to be Jolinar, a member of the Tok'ra, a legendary faction of rebel-Goa'uld opposed to the System Lords. When Jolinar is assassinated, she saves the life of Samantha Carter.
25	3	"Prisoners"	David Warry-Smith	Terry Curtis Fox	July 10, 1998
After being sentenced to life imprisonment on the planet Hadante, SG-1 escapes with the help of a female inmate named Linea, who has great herbal knowledge. After they set her free, they discover she is known as the "Destroyer of Worlds" for once having deliberately created a vaccine that caused contagious sickness killing half the population of a planet.
26	4	"The Gamekeeper"	Martin Wood	Story by : Jonathan Glassner & Brad Wright; Teleplay by : Jonathan Glassner	July 17, 1998
SG-1 discover a world where all the people are enclosed in a virtual reality, still believing that their planet is dead. SG-1 becomes trapped in the virtual reality, but manage to inform the residents that their planet is beautiful again, and they all go free.
27	5	"Need"	David Warry-Smith	Story by : Robert C. Cooper & Damian Kindler; Teleplay by : Robert C. Cooper	July 24, 1998
Offworld, Daniel stops a young woman from killing herself. She turns out to be the daughter of Pyrus the Godslayer, the ruler of the planet who had overthrown the Goa'uld overlord but to keep the other Goa'ulds from finding out, he keeps the people virtually enslaved and sends back naqahdah. She falls in love with him and uses the narcotic properties of the Sarcophagus to keep him with her, but once home he is rehabilitated and eventually let back into SG-1. He visits the woman, whose father had died, and she promises to improve the lot of her people.
28	6	"Thor's Chariot"	William Gereghty	Katharyn Powers	July 31, 1998
SG-1 returns to Cimmeria ("Thor's Hammer") to help defend the planet when the Goa'uld invade. After a series of tests, they finally reach Thor, who reveals himself to be an Asgard. He is dismayed by SG-1's interference but responds to the crisis by coming in person and removing the invaders from the planet.
29	7	"Message in a Bottle"	David Warry-Smith	Story by : Michael Greenburg & Jarrad Paul; Teleplay by : Brad Wright	August 7, 1998
SG-1 brings back a mysterious sphere from P5C-353. The sphere suddenly sprouts rods that impale O'Neill's shoulder, pinning him to the wall. After attempts to remove it, SG-1 discover it contains microscopic aliens that feed on energy who are the last of an alien race. They eventually agree to be relocated to P4G-881, a planet more suitable for them than Earth.
30	8	"Family"	William Gereghty	Katharyn Powers	August 14, 1998
Bra'tac brings word that Apophis has kidnapped Teal'c's son Rya'c. Returning to Chulak with SG-1, Teal'c finds that his son is brainwashed and loyal to Apophis. Apophis had implanted some deadly pathogen on Rya'c which would have destroyed all life on earth if activated. They resort at last to zat—blasting Rya'c to overcome the brainwashing chemical.
31	9	"Secrets"	Duane Clark	Terry Curtis Fox	August 21, 1998
Having to fulfill a promise to Sha're's father Kasuf, Daniel and Teal'c return to Abydos. Upon their arrival, Daniel learns that his wife, after having been captured by the Goa'uld, is now impregnated by Apophis. On earth, the Stargate Program is under risk of being exposed by a reporter.
32	10	"Bane"	David Warry-Smith	Robert C. Cooper	September 25, 1998
Teal'c is stung by a strange insect while exploring BP6-3Q1. Upon returning to earth, the virus begins changing Teal'c's DNA into its own. He escapes the SGC and develops a friendship with a young girl, Ally, and is ultimately cured.
33	11	"**The Tok'ra**"	Brad Turner	Jonathan Glassner	October 2, 1998
34	12	"**The Tok'ra**"	Brad Turner	Jonathan Glassner	October 9, 1998
Part 1: Jolinar ("In the Line of Duty") has left a mental imprint on Carter, who dreams of the Stargate address of the hidden Tok'ra base at P34-353J. While SG-1 find and liaise with the Tok'ra, Carter's father Jacob is dying of cancer. SG-1 offers an alliance with the Tok'ra, but it is turned down because Earth doesn't have enough to offer. Part 2: SG-1 makes their alliance with the Tok'ra official when Jacob offers himself as a new host for Selmak, whose old host is dying.
35	13	"Spirits"	Martin Wood	Tor Alexander Valenza	October 23, 1998
SG-1 discovers a migratory people descended from the Native American Salish tribes on PXY-887. The Salish refuse to allow the SGC to mine their planet's large deposits of the valuable metal trinium, believing it would upset the spirits of the natural world. Under pressure from above, General Hammond orders mining to proceed without Salish permission, incurring the ire of their "spirits", in fact advanced aliens who freed the Salish from the Goa'uld a millennium ago. The Salish Spirits attack the SGC, until SG-1 convinces them that burying their Stargate would be a better solution than destroying the base.
36	14	"Touchstone"	Brad Turner	Sam Egan	October 30, 1998
Inhabitants of the planet Madrona accuse SG-1 of stealing 'the Touchstone', an artifact that can control their planet's weather. The Madronans claim that men dressed in SGC uniforms took the device, and SG-1 suspect that maybe the thieves are using the second gate found in Antarctica.
37	15 (Note: Sky One aired "A Matter of Time" on December 9, 1998, and "The Fifth Race" one week later on December 16, 1998. Showtime, however, aired "The Fifth Race" on January 22, 1999, and "A Matter of Time" one week later on January 29, 1999. The British order is also the episode order on the DVDs.)	"The Fifth Race"	David Warry-Smith	Robert C. Cooper	December 16, 1998 (Sky One); January 22, 1999 (Showtime)
On P3R-272, O'Neill is grabbed by an Ancient Repository of Knowledge, and has alien knowledge downloaded into his mind. Before Jack's mind is overrun, he discovers a gate address to the Asgard homeworld, who remove the information from his brain, saving his life.
38	16	"A Matter of Time"	Martin Wood	Story by : Misha Rashovich; Teleplay by : Brad Wright	December 9, 1998 (Sky One); January 29, 1999 (Showtime)
SG-10 is stranded on planet P3W-451, which is close to a newly formed black hole. The SGC opens the gate to find out what happened, but they cannot shut it down afterwards. Soon they realize that since the planet is near to a black hole, its intense gravity is causing time dilation, so if they do not shut down the gate very soon, it will destroy the SGC, and in time, the entire planet.
39	17 (Note: Sky One aired "Serpent's Song" on January 6, 1999, and "Holiday" one week later on January 13, 1999. Showtime, however, aired "Holiday" on February 5, 1999, and "Serpent's Song" one week later on February 12, 1999. The British order is also the episode order on the DVDs.)	"Holiday"	David Warry-Smith	Tor Alexander Valenza	January 13, 1999 (Sky One); February 5, 1999 (Showtime)
SG-1 meets an elderly man called Machello and learns that he has been hunted by the Goa'uld his entire life due to his inventions of technological devices meant to oppose them. Machello convinces Daniel to grasp a device made to switch bodies, and then escapes, leaving Daniel to die in Machello's old body.
40	18	"Serpent's Song"	Peter DeLuise	Katharyn Powers	January 6, 1999 (Sky One); February 12, 1999 (Showtime)
Apophis's death glider crashes on PB5-926. Dying, he is brought to the SGC. The Tau'ri wish to interrogate him, however Martouf warns them that Sokar and many other Goa'uld want him. The Tau'ri fail to heed his warning and Sokar tries to attack Earth as he wants Apophis, but he stops when they hand over the dead Apophis. However, Martouf informs them Sokar will use a sarcophagus to revive him and torture him indefinitely.
41	19	"One False Step"	William Corcoran	Michael Kaplan & John Sanborn	February 19, 1999
After a UAV crashes into a large white plant on PJ2-445, SG-1 encounters inhabitants who appear to be dying en masse. SG-1 discover that the aliens depend on the large plants for survival because of an essential infrasound they emit, and rectify the situation.
42	20	"Show and Tell"	Peter DeLuise	Jonathan Glassner	February 26, 1999
A young boy warns SGC of a plot by invisible insectoid aliens (rogue Re'tu, who exist in large numbers on P63-2031) to destroy all humans. A minority of the Re'tu wage war on the Goa'uld by eliminating their potential hosts: humans. The rebels operate in 5-man suicide units, which are capable of setting off an explosion equivalent to a small tactical nuke. SG-1 decide his warning is real, and call the Tok'ra for help, who provide TER's that locate the Re'tus already hiding on the base, and eliminate them.
43	21	"1969"	Charles Correll	Brad Wright	March 5, 1999
When SG-1 steps through the gate to P2X-555, a solar flare sends SG-1 back in time. They meet a young General Hammond, then a lieutenant, who helps them due to a note ("Help them", plus dates of what Carter figures out must be solar flares). They find the Stargate of 1969 and activate it during another solar flare, returning home.
44	22	"**Out of Mind**"	Martin Wood	Story by : Jonathan Glassner & Brad Wright; Teleplay by : Jonathan Glassner; Excerpts by : Hart Hanson, Katharyn Powers, Robert C. Cooper, James Crocker, Jonathan Glassner, Brad Wright, Terry Curtis Fox, David Bennett Carren, J. Larry Carroll, Michael Greenburg & Jarrad Paul	March 12, 1999
O'Neill, Carter and Daniel awaken from stasis in what appears to be the SGC, almost 79 years in the future. They discover it is actually a Goa'uld hoax by Hathor. Meanwhile, Teal'c leaves the SGC to find SG-1.

== Home media ==
DVD name	Region 1	Region 2	Region 4
Stargate SG-1 Season 2	September 3, 2002	January 27, 2003	February 18, 2004
Volume 2 (201–204)	—	March 20, 2000	—
Volume 3 (205–208)	—	April 24, 2000	—
Volume 4 (209–211, 213)	—	May 29, 2000	—
Volume 5 (212, 214–216)	—	June 26, 2000	—
Volume 6 (217–220)	—	July 24, 2000	—
Volume 7 (221–222, 110, 114)	—	August 28, 2000	—
