= Stargate SG-1 season 1 =

Season of television series

Stargate SG-1
- Season 1
- DVD cover
- Starring: Richard Dean Anderson; Michael Shanks; Amanda Tapping; Christopher Judge; Don S. Davis
- No. of episodes: 22

Release
- Original network: Showtime
- Original release: July 27, 1997 – March 6, 1998

Season chronology
- Next → Season 2

The first season of the military science fiction television series Stargate SG-1 commenced airing on the Showtime channel in the United States on July 27, 1997, concluded on the Sci Fi channel on March 6, 1998, and contained 22 episodes. The show itself is a spin-off from the 1994 hit movie Stargate written by Dean Devlin and Roland Emmerich. Stargate SG-1 re-introduced supporting characters from the film universe, such as Jonathan "Jack" O'Neill and Daniel Jackson and included new characters such as Teal'c, George Hammond and Samantha "Sam" Carter. The first season was about a military-science expedition team discovering how to use the ancient device, named the Stargate, to explore the galaxy. However, they encountered a powerful enemy in the film named the Goa'uld, who are bent on destroying Earth and all who oppose them.

== Ratings success ==
The 100-minute premiere "Children of the Gods", which aired on July 27, 1997, at 8 p.m, received Showtime's highest-ever ratings for a series premiere and ranked as the highest-rated original movie to premiere on Showtime at the time. The show got a 10.5 rating in Showtime's approximately 12 million U.S. households, which equaled approximately 1.5 million homes in total. Season one regular cast members included Richard Dean Anderson, Amanda Tapping, Michael Shanks, with Christopher Judge and Don S. Davis.

== Development ==
=== Production ===
Brad Wright and Jonathan Glassner had worked together on the Metro–Goldwyn–Mayer (MGM) television series The Outer Limits since 1995. Wright saw a wide range of possible science fiction storylines in the original Stargate (1994) film that could take place in the present day. Meanwhile, Glassner was interested in the feature film's theme that Ancient Egypt had been partially or completely built by aliens. Upon hearing of MGM's plan to create a television spin-off series of the film, Wright and Glassner independently and unbeknownst to each other approached MGM and proposed their concept for the television series. MGM president John Symes greenlit the project on the condition that Wright and Glassner worked together as executive producers of the new show. The show was eventually given the name Stargate SG-1 after Wright flightily agreed to Symes's pitch question if the team should be called "SG-1". MGM released posters titled Stargate SG-1 within the next week without the knowledge of Wright and Glassner.

John Symes approached Michael Greenburg and Richard Dean Anderson of MacGyver fame. Although Anderson was never a real fan of the science fiction genre, he believed the original concept of a "Stargate" was a good vehicle for a series. Anderson agreed to become involved with the project if his character Jack O'Neill was allowed significantly more comedic leeway than Kurt Russell's character in the feature film. He also requested Stargate SG-1 to be more of an ensemble show, so that he would not be carrying the plot alone as on MacGyver. The American subscription channel Showtime made a two-season commitment for 44 episodes in 1996. Principal photography began in Vancouver in February 1997.

"The First Commandment" was the first Stargate SG-1 episode written by Robert C. Cooper, who would later become an executive producer and co-creator of the spin-off series Stargate Atlantis. Paul McGillion, who played young Ernest Littlefield in "Torment of Tantalus", would go on to play the recurring and later main character Dr. Carson Beckett in Stargate Atlantis. The outside scenes of "Solitudes" were filmed at Pemberton Icefield. The rest of the episode was filmed in the studio, which was filled with fake snow and ice and kept at a low temperature.

=== Production design ===
Lead production designer Richard Hudolin flew to Los Angeles, 1996 to gather material from Stargate for reference and found the original film prop stored outside in the Californian desert. Although the prop had severely disintegrated, he could take a detailed mould for Stargate SG-1 production to build its own prop. The new Stargate was engineered to turn, lock the chevrons, and be computer-controlled to dial specific gate addresses. A portable Stargate prop was built for on-location shoots and required six workers and one full day to set up. Since visual effects are sometimes faster and cheaper, a computer-generated Stargate was occasionally used in on-location shoots in later seasons. some of the Prosthetic and Animatronic Effects were done by Steve Johnson's XFX.

The design of the Stargate Command (SGC) base was supposed to match the real Cheyenne Mountain complex as much as possible. The set had to be twice as high for shooting as the 22 feet tall Stargate prop, but one of Hudolin's original plans of a three-level SGC set was rejected in favor of a two-level set. The gateroom was the biggest room on set and could be redesigned for other scenes. Two multi-purpose rooms were frequently redecorated into the infirmary, Daniel's lab, the cafeteria or the gym. The SGC set and all other sets from the pilot episode were constructed within six weeks in January and February 1997, incorporating some original set pieces from the feature film.

=== Cast and characters ===
The initial season had five main characters getting star billing. Richard Dean Anderson portrayed formerly suicidal United States Air Force Colonel Jack O'Neill. Michael Shanks played the American Egyptologist Daniel Jackson. Both O'Neill and Jackson appeared in the 1994 film Stargate. Amanda Tapping played astrophysicist and United States Air Force captain Samantha "Sam" Carter. Christopher Judge portrayed Teal'c, a Jaffa from Chulak and former First Prime of Apophis. Don S. Davis played George Hammond, the new leader of the Stargate program, taking over after General W.O. West. Numerous supporting characters have been given expansive and recurring appearances in the progressive storyline, including: Teryl Rothery as Janet Fraiser, Gary Jones as Chevron Guy (later identified as Walter Harriman), Jay Acovone as Charles Kawalsky (portrayed by John Diehl in the 1994 feature film), Tom McBeath as Harry Maybourne, and Ronny Cox as Robert Kinsey, among others.

== Main cast ==
- Starring Richard Dean Anderson as Colonel Jack O'Neill
- Michael Shanks as Dr. Daniel Jackson
- Amanda Tapping as Captain Samantha Carter
- With Christopher Judge as Teal'c
- And Don S. Davis as Major General George Hammond

== Release and reception ==
The original airing of "Children of the Gods" on Showtime featured full frontal nudity during the scene showing the possession of Sha're (Vaitiare Bandera) by Amonet. While this has never been repeated on network television and subsequent airings as well as this episode available on most streaming platforms have had the nudity cut out for syndication; it was rated R by the MPAA. The DVD, iTunes and Netflix prints as well as the current Prime Video prints of this episode retain this scene. According to Brad Wright, the Showtime network had insisted on the full frontal nudity despite Wright's vocal opposition; Wright told fan site GateWorld that he would cut the nudity scene from the 2009 direct-to-DVD recut of the pilot episode. The DVD version, in fact, only retains a portion of this scene, with full frontal nudity being cut and a partial syndicate friendly back nudity version used. Likely because of the nudity, the original version of this episode as well as the next two episodes of the series are the first and only ones in the series to be rated by the MPAA (it is rated R), while in the UK the episode is rated 18 by the BBFC (all other episodes have generally been rated PG, or 12, very occasionally 15). It is rated M in Australia, recommended for (but not restricted to) viewers 15 and older. The version available on iTunes and Netflix is the uncut, original version of the episode.

"Hathor" was heavily criticized, and the series' writers themselves acknowledged the episode's weakness. Later, in the Season 7 episode "Heroes (Part 1)", Dr. Fraiser is discussing Jack with the film crew and mentions "the whole Hathor incident, which we were never supposed to speak of again".

"Children of the Gods" was nominated for a Golden Reel Award in the category "Best Sound Editing – Television Movies of the Week" and the music for "Best Sound Editing – Television Episodic – Music". "The Nox" was nominated for an Emmy in the category "Outstanding Music Composition for a Series (Dramatic Underscore)". "Within the Serpent's Grasp" was nominated for a Gemini Award in the category "Best Visual Effects". Richard Dean Anderson won a Saturn Award for Best Genre TV Actor.

=== Cultural references ===
During the production of "Solitudes", a joke was played on Richard Dean Anderson. Whilst filming, when O'Neill asks how Carter is getting along with unearthing the Stargate's DHD, Carter starts ranting at O'Neill for being completely "MacUseless" even though he spent seven years on MacGyver, referring to Richard Dean Anderson's role in both shows. The prank was organized by Tapping in cooperation with the director. Similarly, in the first episode, "Children of the Gods" Carter speaks of "MacGyvering" the Stargate into operation while O'Neill rolls his eyes. The 2009 DVD version of this episode does not contain the MacGyver reference. "Politics" contains a scene that references uploading a virus to an alien mothership, alluding that the solution to the movie Independence Day will not work in this situation. "Within the Serpent's Grasp" contains the only scene produced especially for Showtime, not shown on the syndicated versions. When seeing a floating metal ball, Teal'c explains "It is a Goa'uld long-range visual communication device, somewhat like your television, only much further advanced." In the Showtime version, O'Neill says "Think it gets Showtime?" While this scene remains in the DVD versions of the episode, syndication runs have O'Neill instead saying, "Hmm....Goa'uld TV..." (in a manner similar to that of Homer Simpson)

== Episodes ==
In the United States the series broadcaster, Showtime, aired episodes 7 through 19, except 14 and 17 out of order.

Episodes in bold are continuous episodes, where the story spans over 2 or more episodes.

This is the list of episodes in order as they aired on Showtime.

No. overall	No. in season	Title	Directed by	Written by	Original release date
1	1	"**Children of the Gods**"	Mario Azzopardi	Jonathan Glassner & Brad Wright	July 27, 1997
2	2	"**Children of the Gods**"	Mario Azzopardi	Jonathan Glassner & Brad Wright	July 27, 1997
The Stargate Program (SGC) is revived when Apophis, an alien of the same race as Ra, comes to Earth through the gate seeking hosts. After the attack, Colonel Jack O'Neill and Samantha Carter are sent to Abydos to locate, and bring back, Daniel Jackson. They all are sent to Chulak and befriend Apophis's first prime Teal'c, a Jaffa (incubator to a larval Goa'uld), who joins their side. He helps SG-1 return to Earth, though they cannot save Daniel's wife Sha're and his friend Skaara, who have been taken as hosts.
3	3	"The Enemy Within"	Dennis Berry	Brad Wright	August 1, 1997
After being infested by a Goa'uld parasite in the previous episode, Major Charles Kawalsky shows signs of possession. The symbiote is apparently removed, but Kawalsky remains possessed, tries to return through the Stargate, and is killed by Teal'c.
4	4	"Emancipation"	Jeff Woolnough	Katharyn Powers	August 8, 1997
SG-1 visits a planet inhabited by the Shavadai, a nomadic tribe descended from the Mongols. They regard women as property, and restrict their rights in the belief that to do otherwise would bring "demons" (the Goa'uld) down upon them. Carter ends up being 'sold', but when Carter beats a chieftain in hand-to-hand combat, the team changes the tribe's opinions about the rights of women. Guest starring Soon-Tek Oh and Cary-Hiroyuki Tagawa.
5	5	"The Broca Divide"	William Gereghty	Jonathan Glassner	August 15, 1997
SG-1 travels to P3X-797, a planet divided into 'Light' and 'Dark' sides. While the inhabitants of the light side have a Bronze Age culture bearing similarities to the Minoan civilization, the dark side is infected with a plague that turns people into savages, and the SGC is locked down when SG-1 brings it home. Dr. Janet Fraiser manages to find a cure for both peoples.
6	6	"The First Commandment"	Dennis Berry	Robert C. Cooper	August 22, 1997
As SG-9 is on P3X-513 and long overdue, SG-1 is sent after them to find out what has happened to them. They soon discover that the commander of SG-9 has gone completely insane and set himself up as a god on the planet.
7	7	"Cold Lazarus"	Kenneth J. Girotti	Jeff F. King	August 29, 1997
A strange crystal strikes down O'Neill, replacing him with a double that returns with the team to Earth to find the cause of O'Neill's private grief – his son's death. But the double is dangerously unstable. Can O'Neill return home to save everyone and prevent chaos?
8	8	"The Nox"	Charles Correll	Hart Hanson	September 12, 1997
When a planned ambush goes disastrously awry, resulting in fatalities among the SG-1 team, the peace-loving Nox restore them to life. But while these gentle people can bring back the dead, can they resist the deadly technology of the blood-thirsty Goa'uld?
9	9	"Brief Candle"	Mario Azzopardi	Story by : Steven Barnes; Teleplay by : Katharyn Powers	September 19, 1997
On the mysterious planet Argos, the beautiful Kynthia (Bobbie Phillips) seduces Colonel O'Neill, which means he is condemned to an Argosian lifespan of only a hundred days. As he turns grey and old, will his team succeed in their frantic search for a cure?
10	10	"Thor's Hammer"	Brad Turner	Katharyn Powers	September 26, 1997
SG-1 visits the planet Cimmeria (P3X-974), a planet inhabited by Viking descendants, in search of allies against the Goa'uld. Upon arrival, O'Neill and Teal'c are trapped in a labyrinth, where the only exit is through Thor's Hammer, a device to destroy Goa'uld, but preserve the host. Goa'uld weapons are rendered inoperative but not earth guns. Also in the labyrinth is one of the Unas, the original host species for the Goa'ulds.
11	11	"The Torment of Tantalus"	Jonathan Glassner	Robert C. Cooper	October 3, 1997
SG-1 goes to Heliopolis (PB2-908) and recovers Dr. Ernest Littlefield, who went through the Stargate in 1945 (using a standard diving dress as a spacesuit) and never returned. Daniel nearly stays behind to study a 'book' detailing the meaning of human existence, left behind by the Four Great Races.
12	12	"Bloodlines"	Mario Azzopardi	Story by : Mark Saraceni; Teleplay by : Jeff F. King	October 10, 1997
Teal'c's son Rya'c is to be implanted with his first Goa'uld larva on Chulak, so SG-1 goes to prevent it. However, Rya'c falls ill and can only be saved by a symbiote; Teal'c donates his own, and receives a stolen one for himself. The team also meet Teal'c's first teacher Bra'tac, formerly the greatest of all Jaffa warriors and now still a spry 133 years old, who had taught Teal'c that the Goa'uld were false gods.
13	13	"Fire and Water"	Allan Eastman	Story by : Brad Wright & Katharyn Powers; Teleplay by : Katharyn Powers	October 17, 1997
On P3X-866, SG-1 is given a false memory of Daniel's death by his alien abductor Nem. Nem is a member of an amphibious species named Oannes (Ohne), and wants to know from Daniel what happened to his mate Omoroca in ancient Babylon. Ultimately, Daniel remembers the obscure fact from his studies of ancient myths, and is allowed to go home.
14	14	"Hathor"	Brad Turner	Story by : David Bennett Carren & J. Larry Carroll; Teleplay by : Jonathan Glassner	October 24, 1997
The Goa'uld Hathor (one of the mothers of all Goa'uld) brainwashes the men of the SGC with pheromones, and nearly makes O'Neill host to a larval Goa'uld conceived with Daniel. She flees after the unaffected women of Stargate Command retake the facility.
15	15	"Singularity"	Mario Azzopardi	Robert C. Cooper	October 31, 1997
On the planet Hanka (P8X-987), SG-1 finds the entire planet's inhabitants and SG-7 dead except for Cassandra, a small girl who turns out to have a non removable Naqahdah bomb put in her by Nirrti to destroy the SGC. Ultimately the girl is given to the care of Dr. Janet Fraiser, the SGC doctor, after they discover that the bomb will dissolve if she is kept away from the Stargate.
16	16	"Cor-Ai"	Mario Azzopardi	Tom J. Astle	January 23, 1998
The Byrsa, human inhabitants of the planet Cartago (P3X-1279) that was once enslaved, condemn Teal'c for the atrocities he once committed under Apophis. He is sentenced to death, but when the Goa'uld attack, Teal'c saves his accuser's life and proves he is a changed man.
17	17	"Enigma"	William Gereghty	Katharyn Powers	January 30, 1998
SG-1 rescues a group of highly advanced Tollan from their homeworld, P3X-7763, which has experienced catastrophic volcanic eruptions. The military and the NID take an interest in their technology, and attempt to imprison them for research purposes before Daniel helps them take refuge with the Nox.
18	18	"Solitudes"	Martin Wood	Brad Wright	February 6, 1998
Carter and O'Neill are stranded on an icy planet when the Stargate malfunctions on their return journey to Earth. However, it turns out that they have merely been redirected to a second Stargate in Antarctica.
19	19	"Tin Man"	Jimmy Kaufman	Jeff F. King	February 13, 1998
11,000 years ago, the inhabitants of the planet On Altair (P3X-989) were forced underground by deadly radiation, and eventually transferred their minds into exact android duplicates to survive. By the time SG-1 visits their planet, there is only one remaining individual, Harlan, who creates android replicas of the Earth team to aid him. When this is discovered, the androids must accept that they will stay off-world, and the real SG-1 returns home.
20	20	"**There But for the Grace of God**"	David Warry-Smith	Story by : David Kemper; Teleplay by : Robert C. Cooper	February 20, 1998
On P3R-233, Daniel finds a strange alien mirror and is transported into an alternate universe where he finds things are slightly different from his own reality, including a Goa'uld attack on Earth. Before he returns to his own reality, he learns of a Stargate address where the attack originated.
21	21	"**Politics**"	Martin Wood	Teleplay by : Brad Wright; Excerpts by : Jonathan Glassner, Brad Wright, Hart Hanson, Jeff F. King, Robert C. Cooper, Steven Barnes and Katharyn Powers	February 27, 1998
Senator Robert Kinsey shuts down the Stargate program (as the gate represents a global risk and costs too much money to operate), despite Daniel's warnings that Apophis will attack Earth, and that the Stargate may be Earth's only defense.
22	22	"**Within the Serpent's Grasp**"	David Warry-Smith	Story by : James Crocker; Teleplay by : Jonathan Glassner	March 6, 1998
SG-1 uses the Stargate to go to an address discovered by Daniel Jackson. This turns out to be Apophis's ship, where they find that Skaara has been made host to Apophis's son Klorel. The ship reaches Earth, and the fate of the world hangs in the balance.
