= Tor Alexander Valenza =

American television writer (born 1967)

- Born: April 5, 1967 (age 59); New York City, New York
- Other name: Solar Fred
- Occupations: Solar Energy marketing consultant, television writer

Tor Alexander Valenza (born April 5, 1967) is an American television writer.

== Personal life ==
Tor Alexander Valenza was born in New York City, New York and is the son of former actor and restaurant consultant Frank Valenza and Gloria Valenza. His twin sister is actress Tasia Valenza. He also has an older brother, Greg.

== Career ==
Tor Alexander Valenza is a solar marketing executive and past writer for several television series.

Valenza is also known as "Solar Fred" and writes several blogs about solar energy for solar businesses and solar consumers.

Valenza has written episodes for The Dead Zone, Dharma and Greg and Stargate SG-1. He also acted as senior story editor on Stargate SG-1.

Valenza has also written and directed plays, including “Uptown #9 Tanya With the Bloomingdales Bag”, which was produced as part of the 10 Minute Plays festival in Oxford, MS. The plays were published in Valenza's 10 minute play collection, "Just Give Me 10 Minutes: 4 One Act Plays And 3 Monologues For 1 Evening," published in 2008.

In 2022, Valenza launched "Probably True Solar Stories" podcast, which tells fictional short stories about the solar industry and about how solar energy affecting people's lives and culture.

== List of Episodes written by Valenza ==
- "Legacy" (Stargate SG-1)
- "Spirits" (Stargate SG-1)
- "Holiday" (Stargate SG-1)
- "Point of View" (Stargate SG-1) – co-writer
- "Past and Present" (Stargate SG-1)
- "Urgo" (Stargate SG-1)
- "Divide and Conquer" (Stargate SG-1)
- "Enigma" (The Dead Zone)
- "Pride and Prejudice" (Dharma and Greg)
