= GVFX =

- Industry: Visual effects
- Founded: 1991
- Founder: John Gajdecki
- Headquarters: Vancouver, British Columbia, Canada

GVFX, initially Gajdecki Visual Effects, was a visual effects company initially based in Toronto, founded in the spring of 1991 by John Gajdecki. The company is notable for being one of the first visual effects companies in Canada. A second branch of the company based in Vancouver was started in 1998. Gajdecki left the company in 2002, leaving corporate executive Ron O'Brien as president and CEO. A year later, the company's Los Angeles branch closed in the summer, with the Toronto office closing in September, leaving the company consolidated to its Vancouver branch. The company was in financial trouble at that point, with employees being owed back wages, and Gajdecki stating that "this company didn't have enough money to cover its expenses". Carrying the high capital costs of visual effects equipment proved too much, and he has since liquidated much of his corporate and personal assets to cover the outstanding bills. The Vancouver branch was restructured in 2004.

One of the first series that GVFX worked on was the short-lived Dracula: The Series, but their first big success was with Kung Fu: The Legend Continues. Since then, GVFX has worked on various television projects such as Stargate SG-1, The Outer Limits, Goosebumps, and films such as Mimic and Bride of Chucky, among others. The company was working on I, Robot prior to bankruptcy. After the company went bankrupt, Gajdecki moved to Rainmaker Studios as a visual effects supervisor, and they carried the rest of the production. Gajdecki would continue to work as a visual effects supervisor on films such as Slither, The Hole, and Beverly Hills Chihuahua 2.
