= Vaitiare Bandera =

American model and actress

Vaitiare Hirshon
- Born: Vaitiaré Eugenie Hirshon; August 15, 1964 (age 61); Tahiti, French Polynesia overseas collectivity of France
- Other names: Vaitiare Bandera; Vaitiare Hirshon-Asars
- Spouses: Peter Bandera (m. 1994; div. 1997) Edgars Asars (m. 2004; div. 2016)
- Partner(s): Julio Iglesias (1982–1990); Michael Shanks (1997–2000)
- Children: 2

Vaitiare Eugenia Hirshon (born August 15, 1964), previously known as Vaitiare Bandera and Vaitiare Hirshon-Asars, and also mononymously known as Vaitiaré, is an American actress best known for her appearances in Stargate SG-1.

== Career ==
Vaitiare was a spokesperson for Miller Beer from 1993 to 1995. She has also done ads for McDonald's, Cox Communications, JCPenney, Toyota, Coors Dry, Caroche Jeans in Spain and Honda in Tahiti. She starred in episode one of the Spanish-language telenovela Agujetas de color de rosa, which was broadcast in 45 countries, and has also made guest appearances in Married... with Children, Out of the Blue, and Acapulco H.E.A.T.. Additionally, she had a role in the movie U.S. Marshals. Vaitiare's best known role was in Stargate SG-1, where she guest starred in several episodes as Daniel Jackson's wife, Sha're. She had originally auditioned for the role of Sha're in the 1994 film Stargate, but lost out to Mili Avital. She was offered the role in the subsequent television adaption after auditioning again for the same part.

== Personal life ==
Vaitiare was born in Tahiti, French Polynesia, France, and grew up in Southern California. Her first name, Vaitiare, means "water flower" in Tahitian. She is of Tahitian, French, Cook Islander, English, and German-Jewish descent. Her mother is related to the Royal House of Makea Karika Ariki in the Cook Islands. She is also related to Thomas Robert Alexander Harries Davis, who was the 4th prime minister of the Cook Islands. Her grandfather, Lewis Hirshon, was a stockbroker from New York. She has claimed that her grandfather's house in Tahiti was where the Pulitzer Prize-winning author James A. Michener wrote Return to Paradise.

Between 1982 and 1990, she was in a relationship with singer Julio Iglesias, after which she was married to director Peter Bandera from 1994 until their divorce in 1997. She subsequently entered into a relationship with co-star Michael Shanks after meeting him on the set of Stargate SG-1. The two had a daughter together. This relationship ended in 2000. In 2004, she married Edgars Asars, with whom she had a son. They divorced in 2016.

Vaitiare currently lives in Los Angeles, California, with her daughter and son. She has run three fashion companies.

She is fluent in French, her mother tongue, Spanish, and English.

She served as the executive producer of the award-winning short film Far Away Places, which her daughter wrote and directed at the age of 18, bringing awareness to child sex abuse. The film won 11 awards.

== Filmography ==
This is a partial listing of series/movies which this actress has been in. She is sometimes credited as Vaitiare Hirshon or Vaitiaré.

Year	Title	Role	Notes
1990	Tahiti's Girl	Vaitiare	Spanish comedy film Credited as Vaitiaré
1993	Married... with Children	Sonya	Episode "No Chicken, No Check"
1993	Acapulco H.E.A.T.	Carmen	Episode "Codename: Archangel" Credited as Vaitiaré
1994	Agujetas de color de rosa	Actriz	Episode 1 Credited as Vaitairé
1995	The Final Goal	Lisa	Action-thriller film Credited as Vaitiare Hirshon
1996	Out of the Blue	Tiara	Episode "The Fanetee" Credited as Vaitairé Bandera
1996	Murder, She Wrote	Luisa	Episode "Track Of A Soldier" Credited as Vaitairé Bandera
1996-1998	Pacific Blue	Linda Dominguez	6 episodes Credited as Vaitairé Bandera
1998	U.S. Marshals	Stacia Vela	Credited as Vaitairé Bandera
1997–1999	Stargate SG-1	Sha're/Amaunet	4 episodes Credited as Vaitairé Bandera
2014	Heartbreakers	Geneva Fontenot	2 episodes True-crime television mini—series Credited as Vaitiare Hirshon
2017	Meat Cute	Gluten-Free Lady	Comedic dark short film about a horror-filled romantic encounter Credited as Vaitiare Hirshon
2018	Far Away Places	Tahitian Girl	Short drama film Credited as Vaitiare Hirshon; Also executive producer Written and directed by Vaitiare's daughter Film won 11 awards
