= Peter Woeste =

German-Canadian television director

Peter Woeste (also known as Peter F. Woeste) is a German/Canadian TV director, cinematographer and camera operator. Woeste is best known for his work on Stargate SG-1 as a director and director of photography. Along with Jim Menard, Woeste was one of Stargate SG-1's main cinematographers during its ten-year series run, starting with the pilot episode "Children of the Gods". He also worked on the spin-off Stargate Atlantis and was the cinematographer of the Stargate: Continuum and Stargate: The Ark of Truth direct-to-DVD movies.

He was nominated for an ASC Award in 1997 for In Cold Blood in the category "Outstanding Achievement in Cinematography in Mini-Series", and won a 1997 Blizzard Award in the category "Best Cinematography - Dramatic" for Paris or Somewhere. He was nominated for a Gemini Award in the category "Best Photography in a Dramatic Program or Series" three times: in 1994 for Neon Rider, in 1997 for The Legend of the Ruby Silver, and in 2004 for the Stargate SG-1 episode "Nightwalkers". He was nominated for a Leo award in 2008 in the category "Best Cinematography in a feature length production" for Stargate Continuum.

== Personal life ==
Peter formerly taught cinematography at the Nat and Flora Bosa Centre for Film and Animation at Capilano University in North Vancouver, British Columbia.

== Selected filmography ==
=== Director ===
- Stargate SG-1 (11 episodes, 2000–2006)
- Stargate Atlantis (1 episode, 2008)

=== Cinematographer ===
- Stargate: Continuum (2008)
- Stargate: The Ark of Truth (2008)
- Stargate SG-1 (94 episodes, 1997–2007)
- Stargate Atlantis (9 episodes, 1997–2003)
- Profit (5 episodes, 1996–1997)
- Sliders (8 episodes, 1995)
- Neon Rider (19 episodes, 1992–1994)
