= Bill Corcoran =

Canadian film/television director

- Born: William J. Corcoran; January 19, 1951 (age 75); Toronto, Ontario, Canada
- Education: Trent University/Brebeuf College School
- Occupations: Film director, television director
- Years active: 1971–present

William J. Corcoran is a Canadian film and television director.

As a television director his credits include Friday the 13th, Alfred Hitchcock Presents, 21 Jump Street, The Long Kill, Wiseguy, MacGyver, Hope Island, New York Undercover, Mutant X, Stargate SG-1, Pensacola: Wings of Gold, and The Immortal among other series. He has also directed a number of television films.

Corcoran graduated from Trent University.
