= Jonathan Glassner =

American television director, producer and writer

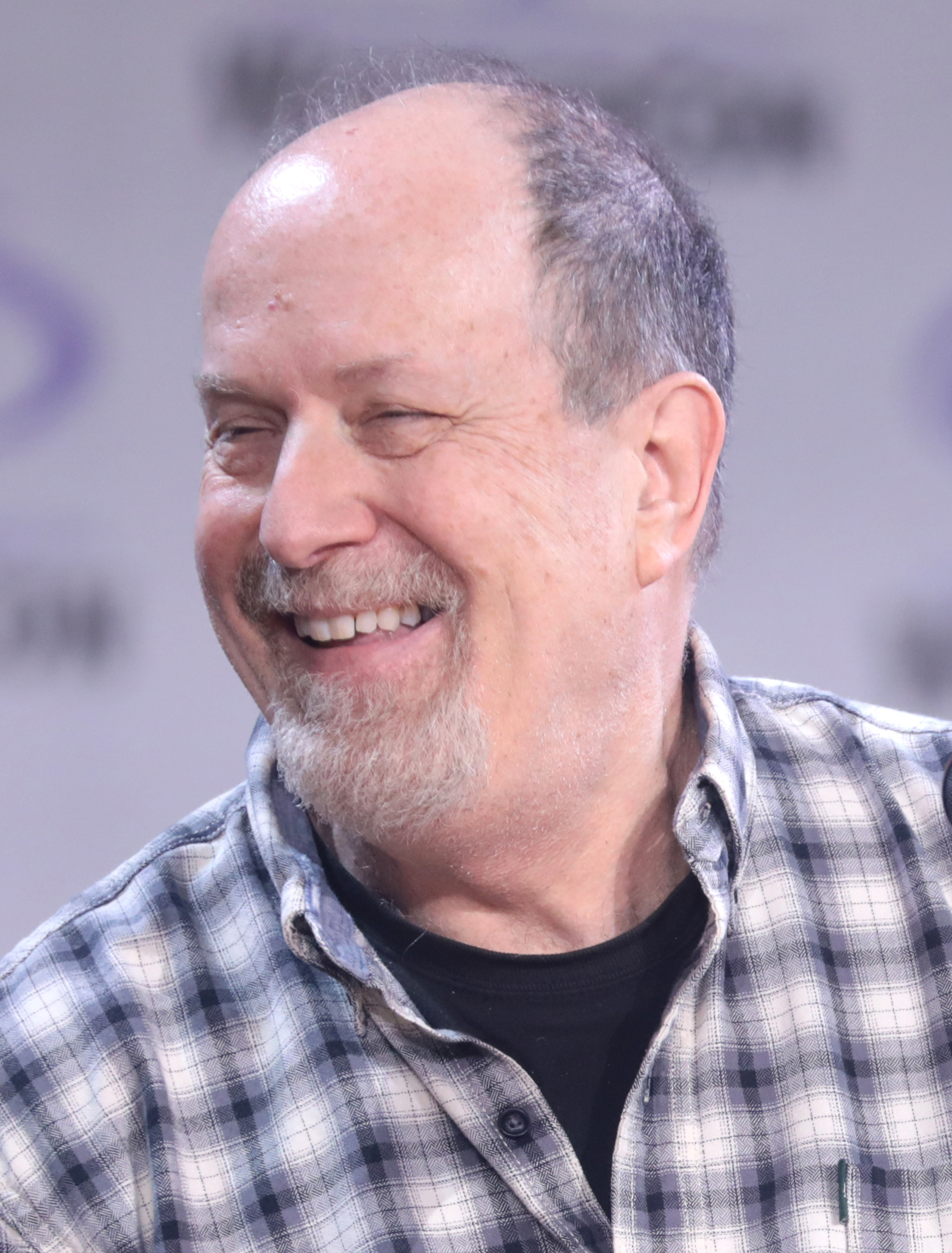
- Glassner at the 2023 WonderCon
- Education: B.A. Northwestern University
- Occupations: Television producer; writer; director

Jonathan Glassner is an American television writer, director, and producer. He is known for his involvement with Stargate SG-1, where he was executive producer for the first three seasons, and The Outer Limits. Glassner was initially noticed as a writer for his work on Alfred Hitchcock Presents. After writing for several television series, including 21 Jump Street, Glassner moved on to The Outer Limits, which naturally segued into his involvement with Stargate SG-1 as a staff writer and executive producer. His most recent work is as a writer and director for CSI: Miami, CSI: NY, and other shows. He was also a co-executive producer on the NBC show Heist and the Fox show Standoff, as well as for Sci-Fi Channel's The Invisible Man.

While at Northwestern University, Glassner also played a leading role in the development and production of Rising Stars, which became the model upon which Star Search was developed. He moved to Los Angeles to become a director and was told that the best way to accomplish that was to start out as a writer. He eventually had enough scripts accepted that he could hire himself as director.

His daughter Samantha Glassner also appears on his series The Ark as nefarious transhuman Kelly.

== Filmography ==
=== Film ===
Title	Year	Credited as		Notes
Title	Year	Producer	Writer	Notes
Mikey	1992	No	Yes	

=== Television ===
The numbers in directing and writing credits refer to the number of episodes.

Title	Year	Credited as				Network	Notes
Title	Year	Creator	Director	Writer	Executive producer	Network	Notes
Ohara	1987	No	No	Yes	No	ABC	unknown episodes
The Wizard	1987	No	No	Yes (2)	No	CBS	
Alfred Hitchcock Presents	1987	No	No	Yes (3)	No	USA Network	
War of the Worlds	1989	No	No	Yes (1)	No	Syndication	
Freddy's Nightmares	1989–1990	No	Yes (1)	Yes (7)	No	Syndication	
Nasty Boys	1990	No	No	Yes (1)	No	NBC	
21 Jump Street	1990–1991	No	No	Yes (5)	No	Syndication	producer (18 episodes)
Street Justice	1991–1993	No	Yes (1)	Yes (8)	Yes	Syndication	
Time Trax	1993	No	No	Yes (1)	No	Prime Time Entertainment Network	
Island City	1993	No	No	Yes	Yes	Prime Time Entertainment Network	Television pilot
The Outer Limits	1995–1998	No	Yes (3)	Yes (9)	Yes	Showtime	co-executive producer (1995–1996: 20 episodes), executive producer (1997–1998: 19 episodes)
Star Trek: Voyager	1995	No	No	Yes (1)	No	UPN	
Stargate SG-1	1997–2007	Yes	Yes (2)	Yes (17)	Yes	Showtime; Syfy	executive producer (1997–2000: 65 episodes)
The Invisible Man	2000–2002	No	Yes (1)	Yes (6)	Yes	Syfy	consulting producer (2000–2001: 22 episodes), executive producer (2002: 1 episode)
Odyssey 5	2002	No	No	Yes (2)	Yes	CTV Sci-Fi Channel	
CSI: Miami	2003–2007	No	Yes (5)	Yes (4)	No	CBS	consulting producer (2003–2004: 24 episodes)
CSI: NY	2005–2008	No	Yes (4)	No	No	CBS	
Close to Home	2006	No	Yes (1)	No	No	CBS	
Heist	2006	No	No	No	No	NBC	co-executive producer (3 episodes)
Standoff	2006–2007	No	Yes (4)	No	No	Fox	co-executive producer (17 episodes)
Prison Break	2009	No	Yes (1)	No	No	Fox	
Covert Affairs	2010–2011	No	Yes (2)	No	No	USA Network	co-executive producer (10 episodes)
Nikita	2011	No	Yes (1)	No	No	The CW	
Breakout Kings	2011	No	Yes (1)	No	No	A&E	
Falling Skies	2015	No	No	Yes (1)	No	TNT	co-executive producer (8 episodes)
The Outpost	2018–2021	No	Yes (2)	Yes (4)	Yes	The CW	executive producer (2018–2019: 14 episodes), producer (2018–2020: 22 episodes)
The Ark	2023–present	No	Yes (1)	Yes (5)	Yes	Syfy	
