= Supernovae in fiction =

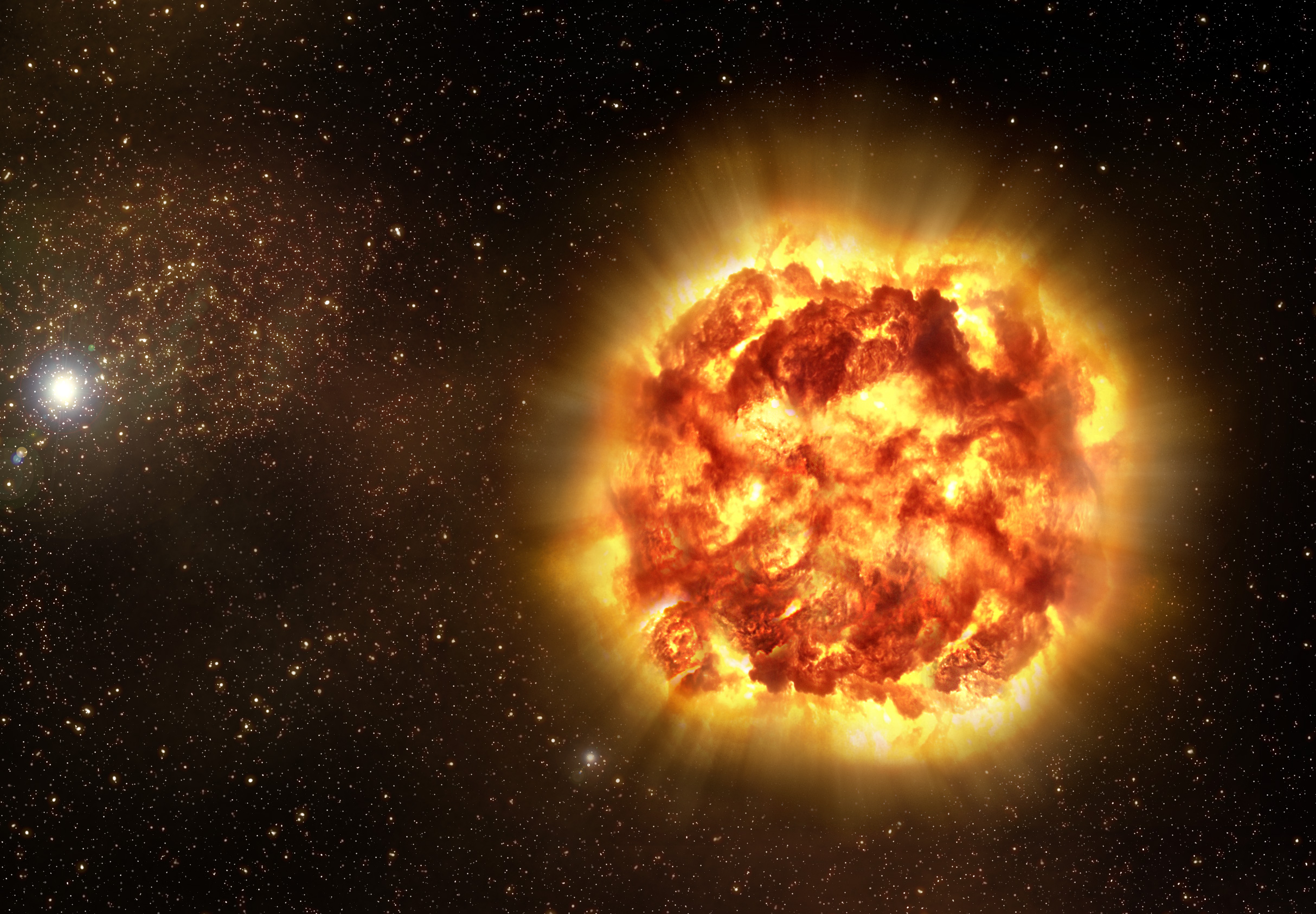
Artist's impression of a supernova

Supernovae, extremely powerful explosions of stars, have been featured in works of fiction since at least the early 1900s. The idea that the Sun could explode in this manner has served as the basis for many stories about disaster striking Earth, though it is now recognized that this cannot actually happen. Recurring themes in these stories include anticipating the inevitable destruction while being helpless and evacuating the planet, sometimes with the assistance of helpful aliens. The destruction of Earth in this manner occasionally serves as backstory explaining why humanity has started colonizing the cosmos. Another recurring scenario is radiation from more distant supernovae threatening Earth. Besides humans, alien civilizations are also occasionally subject to the dangers of supernovae. Supernovae are induced intentionally in several works, typically for use as weapons but sometimes for more peaceful purposes, and naturally occurring supernovae are likewise exploited in some stories.

== Background ==
A supernova is a type of stellar event wherein a star—either a massive star or a white dwarf in a binary system—explodes, releasing enormous amounts of energy in a short period of time. While a nova is strictly speaking a different type of astronomical event (also involving a white dwarf in a binary system releasing large amounts of energy, albeit much less intense as only the surface rather than the entire star is involved), science fiction writers often use the terms interchangeably and refer to stars "going nova" without further clarification. This can at least partially be explained by the earliest science fiction works featuring these phenomena predating the introduction of the term "supernova" as a separate class of event in 1934; before this, any appearance of a "new star" in the sky—as observed by e.g. Tycho Brahe in 1572 and Johannes Kepler in 1604—was referred to as a "nova".

== Disaster ==
=== Sun ===
The prospect of the Sun exploding in this manner has been used in several disaster stories. It was recognized early on that the immense destructive power of such an event would leave little to no hope of survival for humanity, and so while Simon Newcomb's 1903 short story "The End of the World" depicts a few survivors in the immediate aftermath, Hugh Kingsmill's 1924 short story also entitled "The End of the World" instead focuses on the anticipation of the destruction of the Earth. According to science fiction scholar Brian Stableford, writing in the 2006 work Science Fact and Science Fiction: An Encyclopedia, it was thus not until the widespread adoption of the concept of space travel in science fiction—hence making evacuation of the Earth a conceivable prospect—that such stories became popular. In John W. Campbell's 1930 short story "The Voice of the Void" humanity leaves Earth ahead of this disaster, while in Joseph W. Skidmore's 1931 short story "Dramatis Personae" the Sun explodes without warning, leaving a few people already in spaceships as the only survivors. Rescue missions by aliens are sent to Earth in Raymond Z. Gallun's 1935 short story "Nova Solis" and Arthur C. Clarke's 1946 short story "Rescue Party", though in the latter they discover that evacuation has already been undertaken. The Sun exploding occasionally appears as a background event to explain why humanity has abandoned Earth in favour of colonizing the cosmos, one example being Theodore Sturgeon's 1956 short story "The Skills of Xanadu". Clarke's 1958 short story "The Songs of Distant Earth" (later expanded into a 1986 novel bearing the same title) revolves around an encounter between humans who leave Earth shortly before the explosion of the Sun and the members of a centuries-old extrasolar colony. George O. Smith's 1958 novel Fire in the Heavens revisits the theme of anticipating the end of the world as a result of an impending solar explosion, and in Larry Niven's 1971 short story "Inconstant Moon", the sudden brightening of the Moon in the night sky leads the characters to conclude that the Sun has already exploded and will imminently destroy all human life on Earth.

=== Other stars ===
It is now recognized that the Sun cannot turn into a supernova (or nova) as the necessary stellar conditions are not met. (Note: Most types of supernovae result from the core of a star far more massive than the Sun undergoing gravitational collapse, and the remaining type Ia supernovae—as well as the less energetic novae—result from matter accreting onto a white dwarf from a binary companion.) Earth is nevertheless threatened by the radiation from more distant supernovae in several works. In Richard Cowper's 1974 novel The Twilight of Briareus, a supernova some 100 light-years distant causes a radical shift in the Earth's climate, ushering in a new ice age, while in Ian Watson's 1977 short story "The Roentgen Refugees", Sirius going supernova a mere 9 light-years away sterilizes the entire surface of the Earth. Another supernova in the Sirius system appears in Roger MacBride Allen and Eric Kotani's 1991 novel Supernova, and one in the Alpha Centauri system threatens Earth in Charles Sheffield's 1998 novel Aftermath. In Liu Cixin's 2003 novel Supernova Era, a relatively-nearby but previously undetected star 25 light-years away goes supernova, the radiation causing widespread genetic damage to humans on Earth.

Besides humans, alien civilizations are also subject to the dangers of supernovae in some stories. In Clarke's 1955 short story "The Star", an alien species is found to have gone extinct some two millennia ago when their star exploded, creating the biblical Star of Bethlehem. In Poul Anderson's 1967 short story "Day of Burning" (a.k.a. "Supernova"), humans try to evacuate a planet inhabited by a pre-spacefaring society threatened by a supernova. In Stephen Tall's 1971 short story "The Bear with the Knot on His Tail", such a rescue mission is complicated by the language barrier between the humans and the imperiled aliens. The explosion of its star is also the cause of the planet Krypton's destruction in some iterations of the Superman franchise.

== Induced and exploited ==
Inducing supernovae is a recurring motif. One reason is to use them as weapons, a relatively common occurrence in the space opera subgenre. Examples include multiple works by Edmond Hamilton such as the 1930 short story "The Universe Wreckers" and the 1954 short story "Starman Come Home" (later expanded into the 1959 novel The Sun Smasher), Karl Zeigfreid's 1953 novel Chaos in Arcturus, and Norman Spinrad's 1966 novel The Solarians. On-screen portrayals of deliberately caused supernovae also appear, which astrophysicist Elizabeth Stanway attributes to the visual appeal of the resulting explosions. One example is the 2001 episode "Exodus" of the television series Stargate SG-1, where the event is triggered by a wormhole causing rapid mass loss from the targeted star and thus destabilizing it. Non-weaponized induced supernovae are portrayed in some stories such as Rob Grant and Doug Naylor's 1989 novel Red Dwarf: Infinity Welcomes Careful Drivers, where the purpose is to use the light from the exploded stars to create an interstellar advertisement. The Doctor Who franchise provides examples of a weaponized supernova in the 1988 serial Remembrance of the Daleks, a supernova induced as a power source for the extremely energy-intense process of time travel in the 1972 serial The Three Doctors, and naturally occurring supernovae being exploited for various purposes in the 2006 episode "Doomsday", among others.

== See also ==
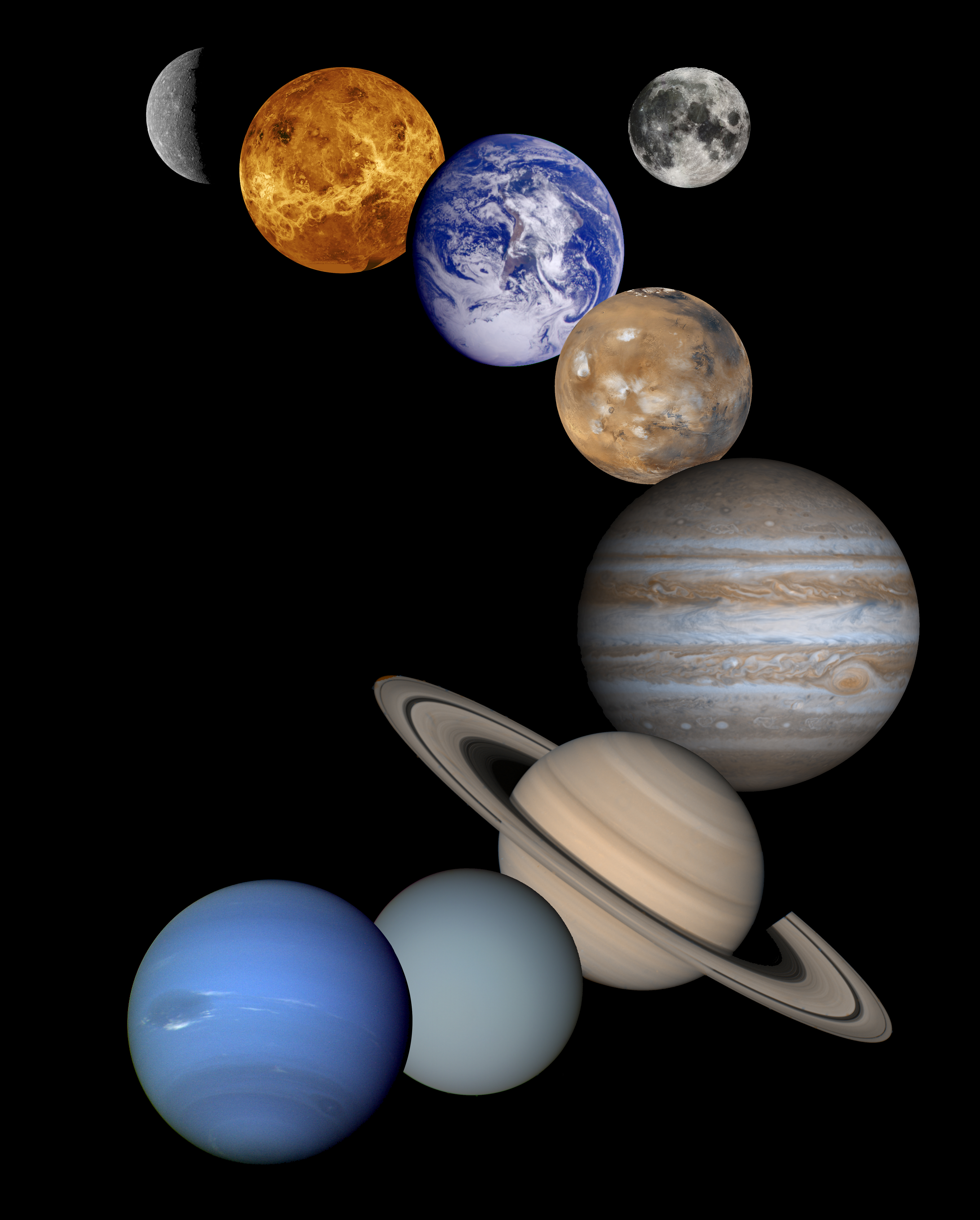
Clicking on a planet leads to the article about its depiction in fiction.

- Black holes in fiction
- Neutron stars in fiction
- Stars in fiction
