= Window of Opportunity (disambiguation) =

Window of opportunity may refer to:

- "Window of Opportunity" (Agents of S.H.I.E.L.D.)
- "Window of Opportunity" (Stargate SG-1)
