= Neutron stars in fiction =

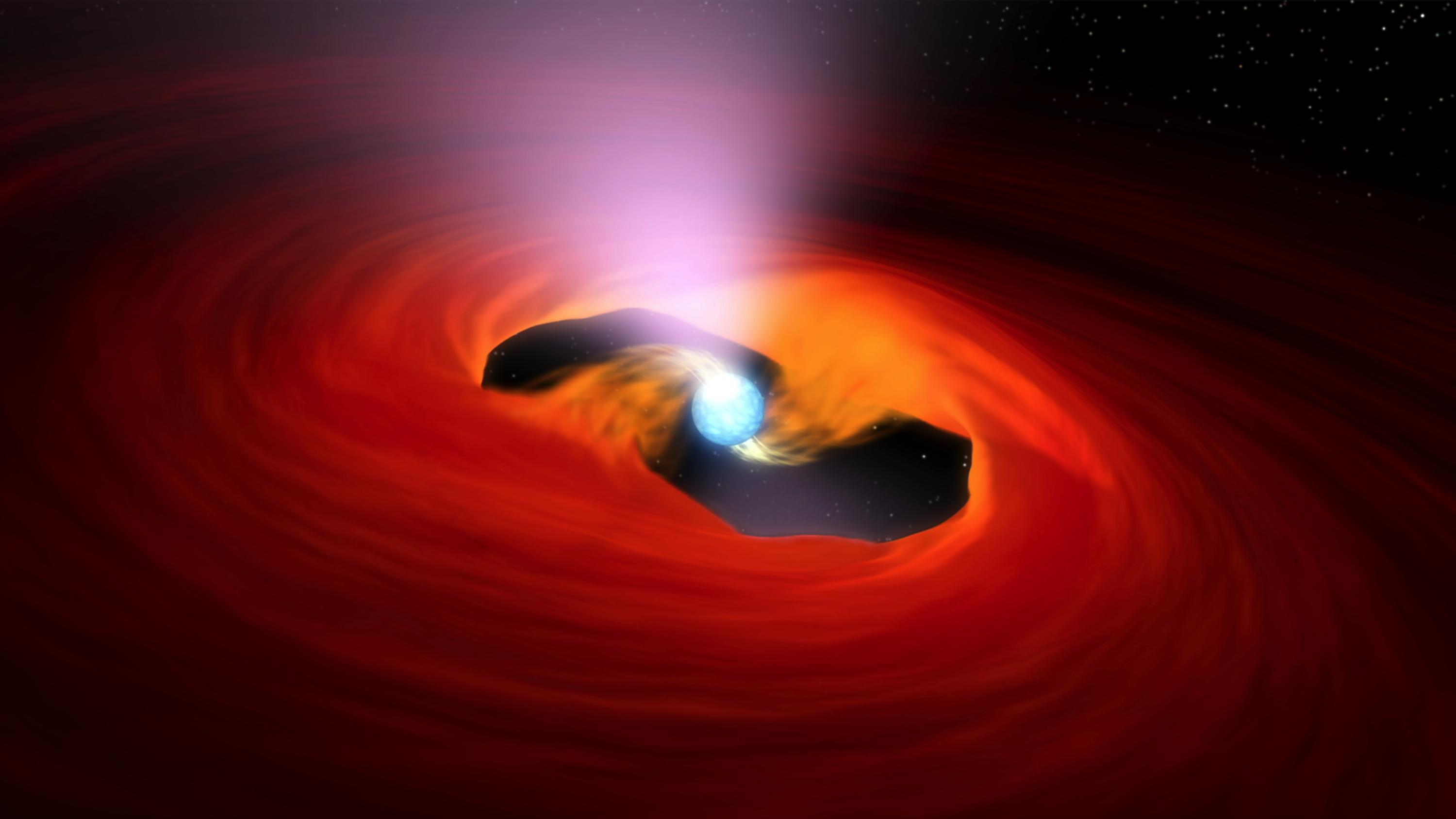
Computer simulation of a neutron star with accretion disk and beams of radiation emanating along its magnetic axis.

Neutron stars—extremely dense remnants of stars that have undergone supernova events—have appeared in fiction since the 1960s. Their immense gravitational fields and resulting extreme tidal forces are a recurring point of focus. Some works depict the neutron stars as harbouring exotic alien lifeforms, while others focus on the habitability of the surrounding system of planets. Neutron star mergers, and their potential to cause extinction events at interstellar distances due to the enormous amounts of radiation released, also feature on occasion. Neutronium, the degenerate matter that makes up neutron stars, often turns up as a material existing outside of them in science fiction; in reality, it would likely not be stable.

== Background ==
Since they were first hypothesised, neutron stars have formed part of the milieu of science fiction. [The Encyclopedia of Science Fiction] describes the terminology as "much used in SF". Indeed neutron stars and pulsars often seem to appear as part of the background setting of science fiction stories. [...] However the plot seldom revolves around their properties in these cases, although a few exceptions do exist.

— Elizabeth Stanway, 2024

When a star runs out of fuel available for nuclear fusion in its core, it undergoes gravitational collapse as there is no longer sufficient outward pressure to counteract the inward force of gravity. For stars similar to the Sun in mass, this produces a dense stellar remnant known as a white dwarf, but for more massive stars it instead results in a supernova explosion. Most of the star's mass is expelled in this explosion, and the remnant core's fate depends on its mass: the most massive ones collapse onto a single point known as a singularity and form a black hole, while less massive ones form neutron stars. In a neutron star, the force of gravity has compressed atoms to the point where the space between the protons in the nucleus and the electrons around it has disappeared, and they have merged to form neutrons. The resulting degenerate matter consisting entirely of neutrons in close proximity to each other—neutronium—has a density on the order of trillions times that of ordinary matter, and millions times that of a white dwarf. As the star contracts to a much smaller size, its rate of rotation increases as a consequence of the conservation of angular momentum; the rotation period is initially between a fraction of a second and a few seconds long, and the rate slows down as the neutron star ages. The combination of the rapid rotation and strong magnetic field of the neutron star produces electromagnetic radiation whose direction changes rapidly and cyclically similar to the light from a lighthouse: such objects are known as pulsars.

== Gravitational effects ==
A neutron star has a mass comparable to the mass of the Sun, yet a comparatively small size on the order of a few kilometers or miles, resulting in an extremely strong gravitational field. The surface gravity thus becomes billions of times that of the Earth, and it is possible for objects to get close enough to its gravitational center that the tidal force—the difference in pull of gravity experienced by the near and far end of the object—can be equivalent to many thousands or millions of times the gravity of the Earth. In the first work of science fiction to depict a neutron star, Larry Niven's 1966 short story "Neutron Star", a spacefarer is thus imperiled when the spacecraft approaches a neutron star too closely and the tidal forces threaten to rip it apart. Arthur C. Clarke's 1970 short story "Neutron Tide" revolves around the destruction of a spaceship by a neutron star's tidal forces. Besides being a hazard, the extreme gravity of neutron stars is exploited for gravity assist maneuvers in Gregory Benford's 1978 novel The Stars in Shroud and for experiments involving distortions of time in the 1988 Star Trek: The Next Generation episode "We'll Always Have Paris".

== Life ==
Some authors have imagined exotic forms of life that could inhabit neutron stars. In Robert L. Forward's 1980 novel Dragon's Egg and its 1985 sequel Starquake, an alien species lives on the surface of a neutron star. Due to the extreme environment in terms of gravity and temperature, these lifeforms are heavily flattened and their biology and structure is based on strong-force interactions between atomic nuclei rather than the electromagnetic interactions between entire atoms of everyday chemistry; as a result, biochemical processes happen on much shorter timeframes and the civilization evolves very rapidly. Similarly, Stephen Baxter's 1993 novel Flux depicts a microscopic species living inside a neutron star. In both Starquake and Flux, the stellar lifeforms are imperiled by starquakes and the resulting glitches, disruptions in the neutron star's rotational speed.

Other works consider the habitability of neutron star systems rather than the neutron stars themselves; as neutron star formation is a byproduct of supernova events, any life that existed in the system prior to that point would be highly unlikely to survive, and life would either need to evolve anew or arrive from elsewhere afterwards. Niven's 1984 novel The Integral Trees and its 1987 sequel The Smoke Ring are set around a neutron star in a gas torus formed from a partially disrupted gas giant, where a diverse ecosystem exists in perpetual free fall. An energy being lives in a nebula around a neutron star in the 1992 Star Trek: The Next Generation episode "Imaginary Friend". In Baxter's 2006 short story "Ghost Wars", a planet in orbit around the binary companion to a neutron star is inhabited—but as the companion star is in the process of being consumed by the neutron star, it cannot remain so for long.

== Mergers ==
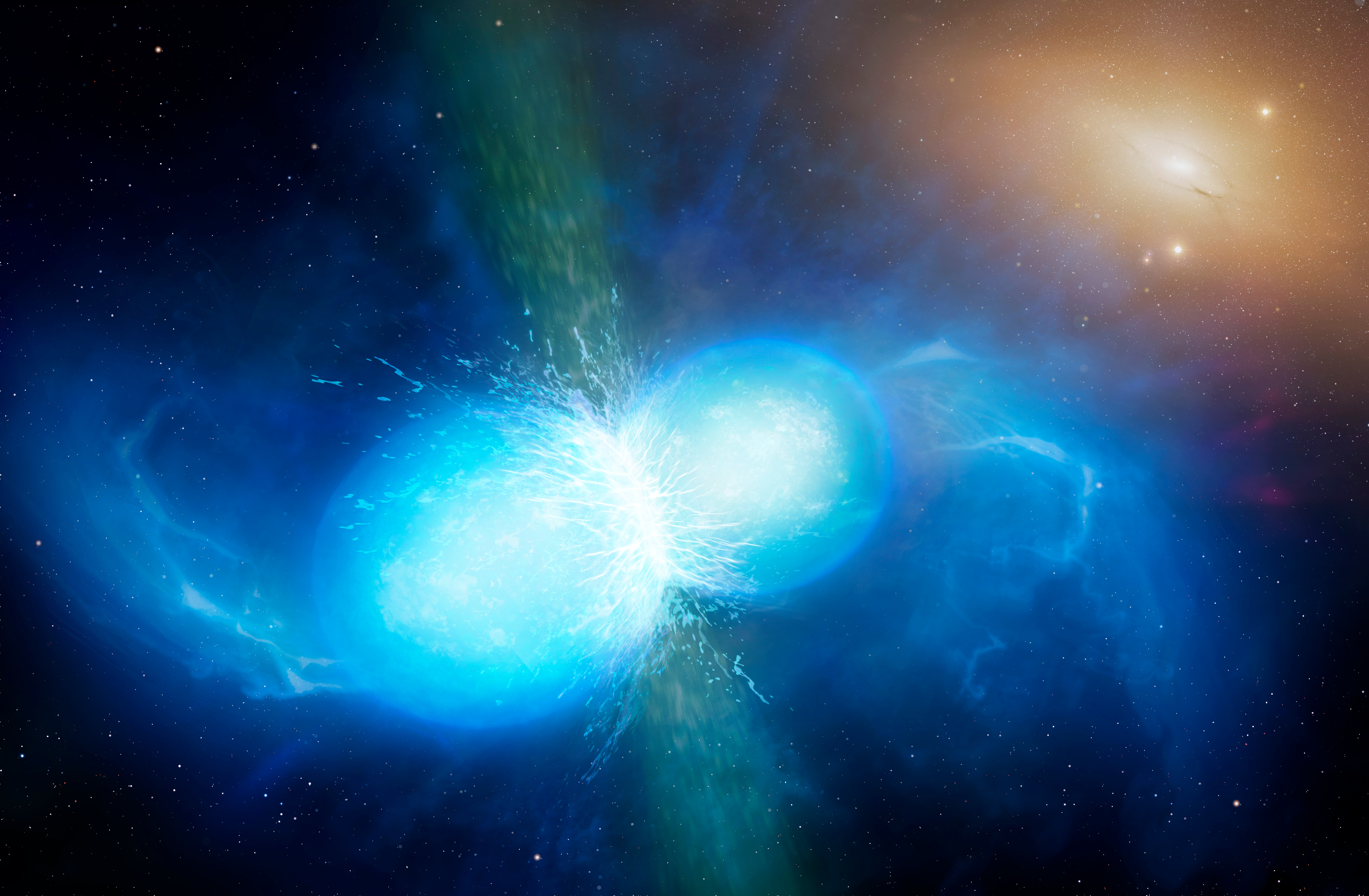
Artist's impression of a neutron star merger

Neutron star mergers release enormous amounts of radiation that could cause extinction events at interstellar distances. In Greg Egan's 1997 novel Diaspora, where most of far-future humanity has embraced posthumanism and had their minds uploaded to computers, the remainder is wiped out when the radiation from such an event strikes the Earth. Besides depictions of the aftermath, Baxter's 2000 novel Manifold: Space (a.k.a. Space: Manifold 2) depicts the construction of immense radiation shields to serve as protection, and the 2005–2006 television series Threshold portrays the lead-up to the anticipated destruction of the Earth by the shockwave from a neutron star merger. The opposite process of a neutron star being disrupted by a binary companion appears in Eric Kotani's 1999 novel Death of a Neutron Star. In the story, observers worry that the mass loss could result in the neutron-forming process happening in reverse, rapidly releasing potentially calamitous amounts of energy.

== Neutronium ==
The neutronium that makes up neutron stars was first hypothesized as a substance in the 1920s, before the neutron itself was confirmed as a real subatomic particle. It frequently makes appearances in science fiction as a material existing outside of neutron stars, though astrophysicist Elizabeth Stanway writes that it would most likely not be stable outside of those extreme gravitational conditions. In Niven's 1968 short story "There Is a Tide", a ten-foot piece of neutronium destroys the spaceship of scavengers who mistake it for a valuable artefact through its gravitational effects. In Robert Silverberg's 1987 short story "The Iron Star", a mission to extract neutronium from a neutron star leads to a first contact encounter with an alien species in the star's vicinity. In Peter F. Hamilton's 1997 novel The Neutronium Alchemist, neutronium is synthesized and weaponized.

== See also ==
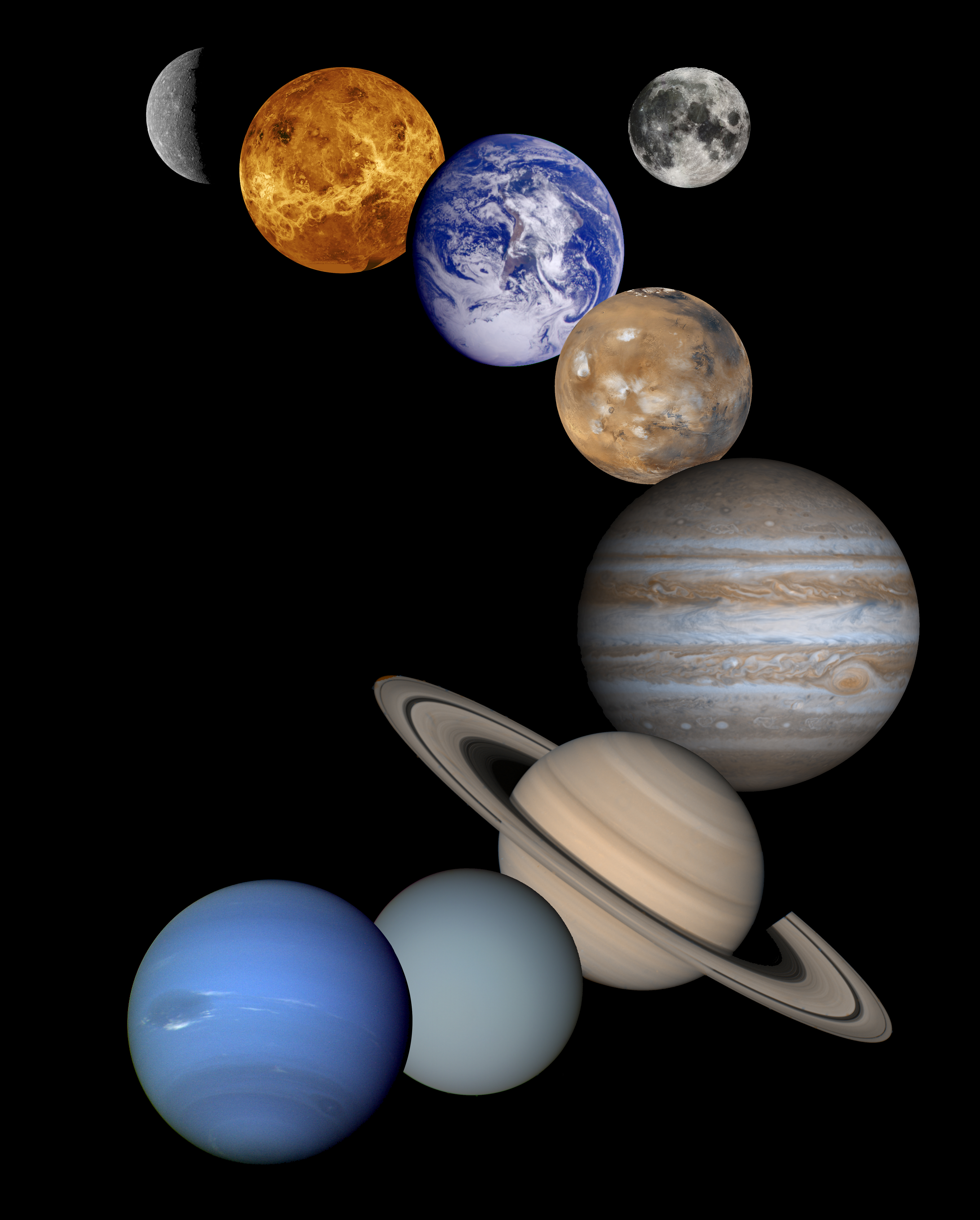
Clicking on a planet leads to the article about its depiction in fiction.

- Black holes in fiction
- Stars in fiction
- Supernovae in fiction
