= A World Out of Time =

1976 novel by Larry Niven

- First edition cover
- Author: Larry Niven
- Cover artist: Rick Sternbach
- Language: English
- Series: The State
- Genre: Science fiction
- Publisher: Holt, Rinehart and Winston
- Publication date: 1976
- Publication place: United States
- Media type: Print (hardcover and paperback)
- Pages: 243
- ISBN: 0-03-017776-6
- OCLC: 2202363
- Followed by: The Integral Trees

A World Out of Time is a science fiction novel by Larry Niven published in 1976. It is set outside the Known Space universe of many of Niven's stories, but is otherwise fairly representative of his 1970s hard science fiction novels. The main part of the novel was originally serialized in Galaxy magazine as The Children of the State; another part was originally published as the short story "Rammer". A World Out of Time placed fifth in the annual Locus Poll in 1977.

== Plot summary ==
In 1970 architect Jerome Branch Corbell, who has incurable cancer, has himself cryogenically frozen in the hopes of a being revived in the future when a cure is available. When he is revived in 2190 he find Earth is ruled by a totalitarian global government called "the State". His personality and memories are extracted (destroying his body in the process) and transferred into the body of a mindwiped criminal.

After awakening, he is evaluated by Pierce, a "checker" who has to decide whether he is worth keeping. With the threat of his own mindwiping looming, Corbell works hard to pass various tests. Pierce concludes that Corbell is a loner and born tourist, making him an ideal candidate to pilot a one-man Bussard ramjet that will seed suitable planets as the first step to terraforming them. Realizing it is a one-way trip and disgusted with the State's treatment of him as an expendable commodity, Corbell hijacks the ship after its launch and decides to visit the center of the galaxy instead. (It was at this point that the original short story ended.)

Pierce (actually named Peerssa) secretly transmits an artificial intelligence (AI) program based on his personality into the ship's computer. Though the Peerssa AI opposes the detour, it cannot disobey Corbell's direct orders. After 150 years pass on the ship, with Corbell's survival made possible by a combination of suspended animation and relativistic speed, Peersa reveals they could have taken a shorter route home. Peersa did not provide Corbell with this information, as the AI viewed Corbell as a potential threat to the State. Instead of 70,000 years, 3 million years have passed in the outside universe.

Peersa takes the ship and Corbell to what he believes is the Solar System, but one with significant changes. The Sun is a red giant and a planet sized moon is in orbit around what appears to be a much hotter Jupiter. Too old to attempt a visit to any of the other human-occupied star systems, Corbell puts the ship into orbit around what turns out to be Earth. Peersa reports that Earth's climate has changed: the poles are now temperate, while the former temperate zones reach temperatures of over 50 degrees Celsius (120+ degrees Fahrenheit). The poles now experience six years of night and six of day. Almost all remaining life has adapted to live in Antarctica, except for some indications of biological activity in the Himalayan mountains.

Corbell adapts a biological probe and uses it to land on Earth, where he is captured by Mirelly-Lyra, a fellow returned starship crewperson and refugee from the past (though from Corbell's future). She explains that the human species has fragmented; it is dominated by a race of immortal, permanently pre-adolescent males (the Boys). Sometime in the past, they had defeated the equally immortal (though now extinct) Girls in the ultimate war of the sexes. The Boys have enslaved the dikta, or unmodified humans, from whom they take boys to replenish their ranks.

Mirelly-Lyra had initially been a captive of the Girls. After their downfall, she obsessively searched in vain for the lost adult-immortality treatment, extending her life as much as possible using her own anti-aging drugs and a form of zero-time stasis, while waiting for another returning starship and potential help. By the time she captures Corbell she is an old crone. He manages to escape from her, only to be caught by the Boys, who take him to a dikta settlement. Corbell learns that long ago a breakaway interstellar colony had caused the Sun to prematurely enter its red giant stage, causing the Earth to overheat. The Girls moved the Earth to a habitable distance from the Sun, but an error caused Jupiter to overheat. In desperation, the Girls tried to take over the Boys' territory to save themselves, but lost. With Gording, the dikta leader, Corbell escapes once more.

Eventually, Corbell realizes he had already discovered the adult-immortality treatment when he shows signs of rejuvenation. He uses it to enlist Mirelly-Lyra's help, which in turn gives him control of his ship (Peerssa having decided that Mirelly-Lyra is the last survivor of the State and will obey only her.) Peerssa maneuvers the planet Uranus (previously used by the Girls to move the Earth using its gravitational attraction) to drag Earth into a new orbit that will lower the temperature without killing the plants and animals that have adapted to the extreme conditions. With the Boys likely to perish in the ensuing climate change (and Peersa in orbit with a particle beam weapon to make sure), Corbell assists Gording with liberation of the dikta.

== Literary significance and reception ==
The New York Times reviewer Gerald Jonas wrote that, in a novel filled with wonders, "Niven describes everything in the toneless accents of a tour guide on a fall foliage caravan.... after a while, the wonders begin to blur together [and] the reader begins to yearn for less matter and more art." Jerry L. Parsons in his review for the Library Journal said that A World Out of Time was reminiscent in parts of 2001: A Space Odyssey and To Your Scattered Bodies Go. He wrote, "a wonderfully escapist adventure, this story has a minimum of character development and description, but a maximum of excitement."

Geoff Ryman has described A World Out of Time as one of Niven's "hardest" works, but went on to specify that many of the concepts Niven used as plot points were "disintegrated by later research".

Robert Silverberg reviewed World unfavorably, terming it a "rambling, loose-jointed novel that seems to have assembled itself out of the handiest pieces in the heap while its author's attention was elsewhere." Richard A. Lupoff was similarly critical, saying Niven "starts out like a Saturn V and all too soon fizzles like a Vanguard.... this is either a novel that begins well and then goes dreadfully wrong or a cobbling together of several novelettes the first of which is a beauty and the others of which are stinkers."

== Awards and nominations ==
A World Out of Time was a nominee for the following awards:

- 1977 Locus Award in the Novel category (5th place)
- 1977 Ditmar Award in the international science fiction category

== Connections to other Niven works ==
The story does not take place in Niven's Known Space. It does share the same setting as two of his other novels, The Integral Trees (1983) and The Smoke Ring (1987) as well as the short story "The Kiteman". All three novels feature the totalitarian interplanetary State, "corpsicle" personality transfers into mind-wiped criminals without civil rights, police-like enforcers called "checkers," and a computer artificial intelligence personality in charge of a ramship expedition that seeds life in other systems to prepare them for human colonization.

== Literary reference ==
The protagonist's name is a play on that of the author James Branch Cabell, whom Niven also mentions in some of his other writing.

== See also ==
- The Wandering Earth, a Chinese film and novel that also features an interaction between the Earth and Jupiter in an attempt to escape the Sun's death
