= Shades of Darkness =

1986 novel by Richard Cowper

Shades of Darkness is a horror novel by British writer Richard Cowper, published in 1986.

== Plot summary ==
Shades of Darkness is a novel in which a ghost story is the theme.

== Reception ==
David Langford reviewed Shades of Darkness for White Dwarf #85, stating that "The essence of horror is the turning of the screw. Cowper turns it with discreet style and wit, but never quite far enough."

== Reviews ==
- Review by Dan Chow (1987) in Locus, #313 February 1987
- Review by Charles de Lint (1987) in Fantasy Review, April 1987
- Review by Helen McNabb (1987) in Vector 137
- Review by John Clute (1987) in Interzone, #20 Summer 1987
- Review by Mike Christie (1987) in Foundation, #38 Winter 1986/87
- Review by Don D'Ammassa (1988) in Science Fiction Chronicle, #100 January 1988
- Review by Charles de Lint (1988) in Short Form, February 1988
