= Aschen =

Aschen may refer to:

- A quarter in Diepholz, Germany
- A fictional human race in Stargate SG-1 season 4
