= The Integral Trees =

1984 science fiction novel by Larry Niven

- First publication in Analog
- Author: Larry Niven
- Cover artist: Vincent Di Fate
- Language: English
- Series: The State
- Genre: Science fiction
- Publisher: Del Rey Books
- Publication date: 1984
- Publication place: United States
- Media type: Print (hardback & paperback)
- Pages: 240
- Award: Locus Award for Best Science Fiction Novel (1985)
- ISBN: 0-345-31270-8
- OCLC: 9893599
- Dewey Decimal: 813/.54 19
- LC Class: PS3564.I9 I54 1984
- Preceded by: A World Out of Time
- Followed by: The Smoke Ring

Illustration of an integral tree (not to scale)

The Integral Trees is a 1984 science fiction novel by American writer Larry Niven (first published as a serial in Analog in 1983). Like much of Niven's work, the story is heavily influenced by the setting: a gas torus, a ring of air around a neutron star. A sequel, The Smoke Ring, was published in 1987.

It was nominated for the Nebula Award for Best Novel in 1984, and the Hugo Award for Best Novel in 1985.

== Setting ==
The story occurs around the fictional neutron star Levoy's Star (abbreviated "Voy"). The gas giant Goldblatt's World (abbreviated "Gold") orbits this star just outside its Roche limit and therefore its gravity is insufficient to keep its atmosphere, which is pulled loose into an independent orbit around Voy and forms a gas torus around Voy. The gas torus is huge—one million kilometers thick—but most of it is too thin to be habitable. The central part of the gas torus, where the air is thicker, is known as the Smoke Ring. The Smoke Ring supports a wide variety of life.

There is no "ground" in the Smoke Ring. Furthermore, the Smoke Ring is in orbit and therefore in free fall: there is no "up" or "down". Most animals have trilateral symmetry that allows them to see in all directions. The majority of Smoke Ring animals have evolved to fly on at least an occasional basis—even the fish. The Smoke Ring contains numerous "ponds", globs of water of various sizes which float free like everything else. While there are aquatic and amphibious animals in the Smoke Ring that live the majority of their lives in such ponds, these animals may find their habitat unsuitable at any moment. Whether their home pond drifts too far out of the habitable center of the Smoke Ring and into the gas torus, becomes too large and breaks up due to tidal forces, or impacts a large object such as an integral tree, aquatic animals must be able to propel themselves through the air to find a new place to live.

Most plants in the Smoke Ring are quite fragile because they do not need to support their own weight. A notable exception to this rule are the eponymous Integral Trees, which can grow up to 100 kilometers long. Tidal locking causes them to be radially oriented, with one end pointing in toward Voy while the other points toward space. The ends of the tree feel a tidal force of up to 1/5 g_{0} on the largest trees. Each end of a tree is a green, leafy tuft.

An integral tree tuft is up to 50 kilometers from the tree's center of mass. Thus, a tuft is either orbiting too slowly (the "in" tuft) or too quickly (the "out" tuft) compared to the atmosphere, which is in orbit at all points. The ends of the tree are therefore subject to a constant gale-force wind that causes the ends to curve into the shape of an integral symbol (∫) and pushes water and food onto the tufts, or (less forcefully) onto the trunk, where the gravity-like tidal forces pull the material out towards the tufts.

Each tuft serves several main purposes for the tree. First, the green foliage is photosynthetic, providing the tree with energy from sunlight; second, the tufts are where the tree produces its seeds; and third, various plants, animals, and sundry other objects can become trapped in the tighter branches, which gradually migrate toward the "treemouth". The treemouth, a pit at the top of each tuft on the lee side of the trunk, is the integral tree's root; water collected along the trunk flows down due to tidal forces and is ingested by the treemouth. Tuft branches catch and capture various things and animals in the wind and gradually, over the course of years, migrate to the treemouth, where they and their catch are absorbed by the tree for nourishment. Many other large Smoke Ring plants have a scavenger/carnivore aspect similar to this, though with somewhat different mechanisms.

== Plot summary ==
Twenty astronauts aboard an interstellar "ramship" colonized the Smoke Ring five hundred years before the story begins. Their descendants have adapted their cultures to the free-fall environment. Without gravity, even those who live in integral tree tufts are much taller than Earth-average humans, having grown up in much weaker gravity. Many people are able to use their longer, prehensile toes as another set of fingers. The small number of devices left from the original crew are coveted items in Smoke Ring societies.

Quinn Tribe inhabits the "in tuft" of Dalton-Quinn tree. They normally subsist on the tree's cottony foliage, augmented by hunting and a flock of domesticated turkeys. But since the tree passed near Gold six earth years ago it has been falling toward Voy, nearly dropping out of the Smoke Ring. As a result, the tribe suffers a severe drought. The tribe's leader, the chairman, decides to send a party of nine up the tree, ostensibly to hunt and re-cut tribal markings into the trunk. The group consists mostly of people with disability and people the chairman dislikes, including the chairman's son-in-law (and rival) Clave, and Jeffer, the Scientist's apprentice.

When they approach the midpoint, they notice that the tribal markings are different; upon reaching it, they are attacked by members of the Dalton-Quinn tribe who live at the other end of the tree. During the battle, the tree splits in half (an Integral Tree defense mechanism for just such a threatening drift out of the Smoke Ring), causing the in tuft to fall farther toward Voy (killing its inhabitants) and allowing the out tuft to find a new equilibrium that is closer to the Smoke Ring's median. The seven surviving members of the Quinn Tribe and one of the attackers jump clear of the shattered tree and are left adrift in the sky with only a few "jet pods" (high pressure seed cases that provide a temporary thrust when opened) as their only method of propulsion.

Before dying of thirst, they hook a passing "moby" (a flying whale-like creature) which takes them to a "jungle", which is a floating mass of plant life. They cut loose, crash, and find themselves in the middle of a battle between the Carther States, whose residents live in the jungle, and slavers from London Tree. The group is split when six of them are captured by the slavers; the other two remain in the jungle.

Carther States counter-attacks some weeks later, and the Quinn Tribe group is reunited. During the battle, they steal London Tree's CARM (Cargo And Repair Module), a small spacecraft—a relic of the original settlers. The CARM is still functional due to careful management and its robust design; its solar panels provide electricity to electrolyze water into hydrogen and oxygen, which it stores automatically and then burns for propulsion as needed. London Tree's "Navy", bow- and spear-armed warriors, use the CARM to conduct long-distance military actions and slave raids on a scale impossible for humans in a zero-g environment.

Not fully understanding how to pilot the CARM, the Quinn and Carther warriors engage its main rocket motor, which accelerates the ship at several g, enough to prevent the crew from reaching the controls to turn the motor off. The CARM is propelled up into the thinnest part of the gas torus before running dangerously low on fuel. As a result, they become the first Smoke Ring inhabitants in centuries to see the naked stars.

Unknown to any of the inhabitants of the Smoke Ring, Discipline, the ship in which their ancestors arrived, remains in orbit, and its AI autopilot, Kendy, contacts them. With help from the on-board computer and after some interaction with Kendy, the occupants of the CARM eventually safely return to the Smoke Ring. Unable to reach any of the trees that they know, they decide to settle on a new tree, which they dub "Citizens' Tree".

== Reception ==
Dave Langford reviewed The Integral Trees for White Dwarf #59, and called it "Delightfully ingenious stuff."

=== Awards and nominations ===
The Integral Trees won the 1985 Locus Award for a science fiction novel and was a nominee for these awards:

- 1985 Hugo Award for Best Novel
- 1985 Nebula Award for Best Novel
- 1985 Science Fiction Chronicle Reader Awards

== Reviews ==
- Review by Debbie Notkin in Locus #277 February 1984
- Review by Baird Searles in Isaac Asimov's Science Fiction Magazine, September 1984
- Review by Gary Acton in Fantasy Review, October 1984
- Review by Frank Catalano in Amazing Stories, November 1984
- Review by Algis Budrys in The Magazine of Fantasy & Science Fiction, September 1984
- Review by Ken Lake (1985) in Vector 124/125
- Review by Roland J. Green in Far Frontiers, Volume III/Fall 1985
- Review by David Langford [as by Dave Langford] in White Dwarf, October 1985
- Review by Graham Andrews (1986) in Paperback Inferno #58
- Review by Darrell Bain (2005) in My 100 Most Readable (and Re-Readable) Science Fiction Novels

== See also ==
- The Smoke Ring sequel to The Integral Trees
- Dyson tree
- Neutron stars in fiction

== General and cited references ==
- Niven, Larry (1984). The Integral Trees. New York: Del Rey/Ballantine Books. ISBN 0-345-32065-4.
