= Feghoot =

Short story designed to end with a pun

A feghoot (also known as a story pun or poetic story joke) is a humorous short story or vignette ending in a pun (typically a play on a well-known phrase), where the story contains sufficient context to recognize the punning humor.

== History ==
=== Ferdinand Feghoot ===
The term for this storytelling model originated in a long-running series of short science-fiction pieces that appeared under the collective title "Through Time and Space with Ferdinand Feghoot", published in various magazines over several decades, written by Reginald Bretnor under the anagrammatic pseudonym of 'Grendel Briarton'. The usual formula the stories followed was for the title character to solve a problem bedeviling some manner of being or extricate himself from a dangerous situation. The events could take place all over the galaxy and in various historical or future periods on Earth and elsewhere. In his adventures, Feghoot worked for the Society for the Aesthetic Re-Arrangement of History and traveled via a device that had no name, but was typographically represented as the ")(". The pieces were usually vignettes only a few paragraphs long, and always ended with a long and elegant pun that was often based on a well-known title or catch-phrase.

"Through Time and Space with Ferdinand Feghoot" was originally published in The Magazine of Fantasy & Science Fiction from 1956 to 1973. In 1973, the magazine ran a contest soliciting readers' feghoots as entries. The series also appeared in Fantasy and Science Fiction's sister magazine Venture Science Fiction Magazine, and later in Isaac Asimov's Science Fiction Magazine, Amazing Stories, and other publications. The individual pieces were identified by Roman numerals rather than titles. The stories have been collected in several editions, each an expanded version of the previous, the most recent Through Time and Space with Ferdinand Feghoot by From Beyond Press.

Many of the ideas and puns for Bretnor's stories were contributed by others, including F. M. Busby and E. Nelson Bridwell. Other authors have published feghoots written on their own, including Isaac Asimov and John Brunner. Numerous fan-produced stories have been written, as well.

Bretnor said that the idea of the name occurred to his wife and him during a game of Scrabble. He always arranged his letter tiles alphabetically; at one point, he had EFGHOOT. His wife suggested that, if the first two letters were transposed, the silly name 'Feghoot' could be formed. Bretnor did so, and began using the name in his punny stories.

=== Other story puns ===
- Myles na gCopaleen's column "Cruiskeen Lawn" in the Irish Times regularly featured feghoots, generally recounted as episodes in the lives of (fictionalised versions of) John Keats and George Chapman.
- The "Peabody's Improbable History" and "Aesop & Son" segments on Rocky and Bullwinkle were animated feghoots, right down to the pun at the end of each episode. "Fractured Fairy Tales" often were too.
- In 1962, Amazing Stories published "Through Time and Space with Benedict Breadfruit" by Grandall Barretton (Randall Garrett), which all ended in a pun on the name of a famous science-fiction writer. Bretnor later paid tribute to these stories in one of his own, in which Ferdinand Feghoot assures a friend that Breadfruit was "conceived in our Garrett".
- One example of a feghoot is the "Forty million Frenchmen" gag ("For DeMille, young fur-henchmen...") on page 559 of Thomas Pynchon's Gravity's Rainbow.
- The Callahan's Bar series by Spider Robinson uses "some of the worst puns known to man.... building up to the anticipated pun with skill and flair."
- Isaac Asimov used the song "Give My Regards to Broadway" to form an elaborate story pun in his short story "Death of a Foy". He uses the "Marseillaise" in the short story "Battle-Hymn" for the same effect. His short story "A Loint of Paw" ends with the one-sentence judicial verdict "A niche in time saves Stein." His story "Shah Guido G" ends with aviators landing on a floating sky city named Atlantis and it plummeting to its doom: "Why, once more in history, Atlantis sank beneath the Waves."
- Arthur C. Clarke's short story "Neutron Tide" culminates with a pun.
- Andrzej Sapkowski's short story "The Edge of the World" of The Witcher series (later included in The Last Wish) culminates with a pun, as the protagonist's friend, a bard, is looking for a proper title for his ballad about the recent encounter with a devil-like being, who then says "goodnight" (corresponding to the Polish idiom "where the devil says goodnight" used for remote and dangerous places).
- One version of the story of Little Bunny Foo Foo is a feghoot.
- Each episode of the long-running BBC radio panel game My Word! ended with extemporaneous feghoots from Frank Muir and Denis Norden.
- Comic-strip writer Stephan Pastis often includes feghoots in his strip Pearls Before Swine.
- Humorist S. J. Perelman often contrived elaborate feghoots. His piece "Abby, This Is Your Father" in Crazy Like a Fox (New York: Random House, 1944) is built around a series of them.
- On the US version of the television show Whose Line Is It, Anyway?, Colin Mochrie often opened the "Weird Newscasters" game with a feghoot.
- Comedian Norm Macdonald frequently told feghoots as part of his comedy style.
- The "Misty's Bedtime Stories" segment on Hee-Haw was a feghoot.

== See also ==
- Shaggy dog story
