= Black holes in fiction =

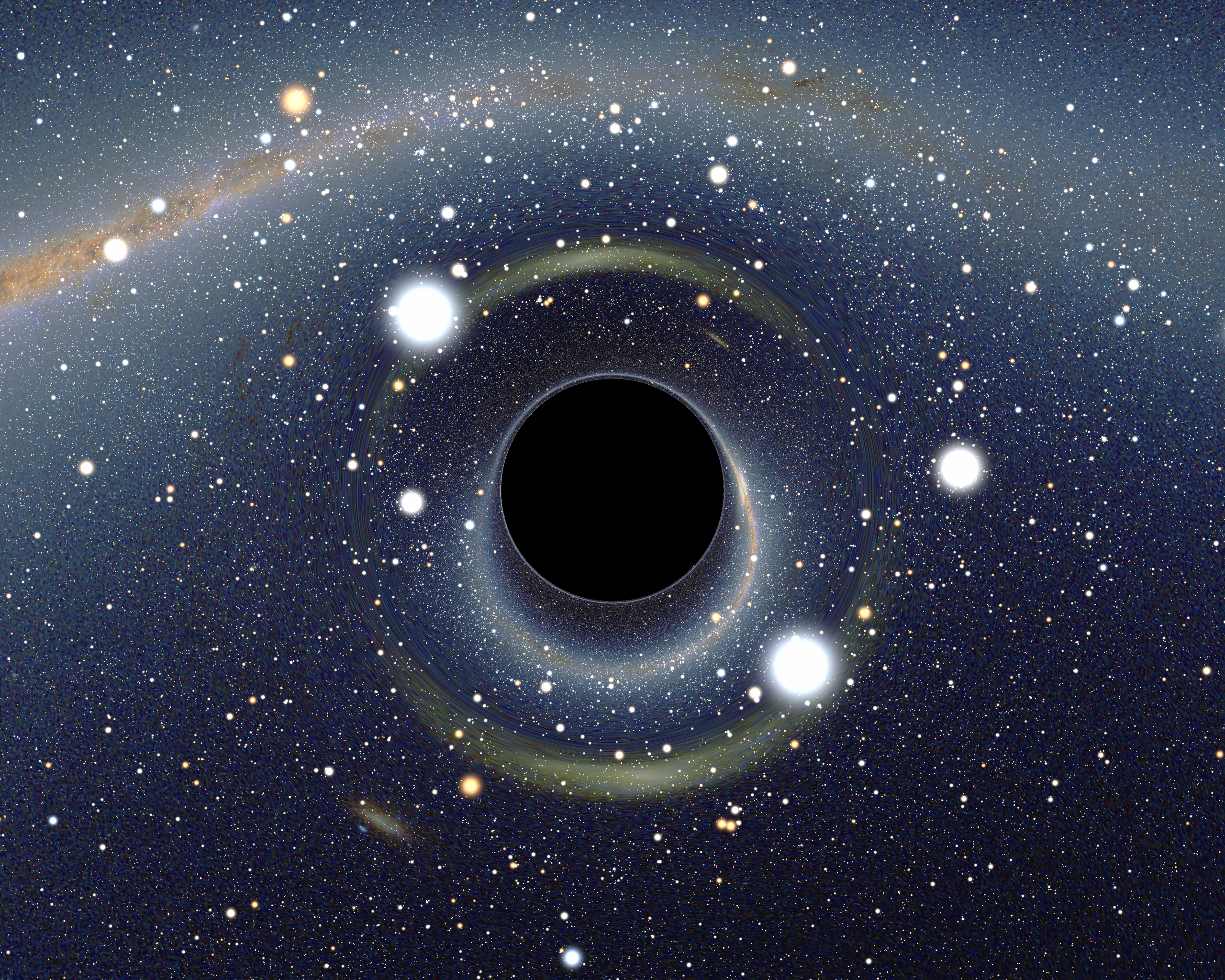
Simulated view of a black hole in front of the Large Magellanic Cloud, with gravitational lensing visible

Black holes, objects whose gravity is so strong that nothing—including light—can escape them, have been depicted in fiction since at least the pulp era of science fiction, before the term black hole was coined. A common portrayal at the time was of black holes as hazards to spacefarers, a motif that has also recurred in later works.

The concept of black holes became popular in science and fiction alike in the 1960s. Authors quickly seized upon the relativistic effect of gravitational time dilation, whereby time passes more slowly closer to a black hole due to its immense gravitational field. Black holes also became a popular means of space travel in science fiction, especially when the notion of wormholes emerged as a relatively plausible way to achieve faster-than-light travel. In this concept, a black hole is connected to its theoretical opposite, a so-called white hole, and as such acts as a gateway to another point in space which might be very distant from the point of entry. More exotically, the point of emergence is occasionally portrayed as another point in time—thus enabling time travel—or even an entirely different universe.

More fanciful depictions of black holes that do not correspond to their known or predicted properties also appear. As nothing inside the event horizon—the distance away from the black hole where the escape velocity exceeds the speed of light—can be observed from the outside, authors have been free to employ artistic license when depicting the interiors of black holes. A small number of works also portray black holes as being sentient.

Besides stellar-mass black holes, supermassive and especially micro black holes also make occasional appearances. Supermassive black holes are a common feature of modern space opera. Recurring themes in stories depicting micro black holes include spaceship propulsion, threatening or causing the destruction of the Earth, and serving as a source of gravity in outer-space settlements.

== Early depictions ==
[V]irtually the whole of gravitational physics can be understood using Newtonian theory. As far as real-world astrophysics goes, the most important exception to this is the existence of black holes. It's probably no coincidence that black holes also happen to be by far the most popular astrophysical phenomena found in science fiction.

— Andrew May, How Space Physics Really Works: Lessons from Well-Constructed Science Fiction

The general concept of black holes, objects whose gravity is so strong that nothing—including light—can escape them, was first proposed by John Michell in 1783 and developed further in the framework of Albert Einstein's theory of general relativity by Karl Schwarzschild in 1916. Serious scientific attention remained relatively limited until the 1960s, the same decade the term black hole was coined, (Note: Often credited to John Archibald Wheeler, who maintained that he merely popularized the term. See Black hole § Etymology for further details.) though objects with the overall characteristics of black holes had made appearances in fiction decades earlier during the pulp era of science fiction. Examples of this include E. E. Smith's 1928 novel The Skylark of Space with its "black sun", Frank K. Kelly's 1935 short story "Starship Invincible" with its "Hole in Space", and Nat Schachner's 1938 short story "Negative Space"—all of which portray the black holes avant la lettre as hazards to spacefarers. Later works that still predate the adoption of the current terminology include Fred Saberhagen's 1965 short story "Masque of the Red Shift" with its "hypermass" and the 1967 Star Trek episode "Tomorrow Is Yesterday" with its "black star".

== Time dilation ==
Once black holes gained mainstream popularity, many of the early works featuring black holes focused on the concept of gravitational time dilation, whereby time passes more slowly closer to a black hole due to the effects of general relativity. One consequence of this is that the process of crossing the event horizon—the distance away from the black hole where the escape velocity exceeds the speed of light—appears to an outside observer to take an infinite amount of time. In Poul Anderson's 1968 short story "Kyrie", a telepathic scream from a being falling into a black hole thus becomes drawn out for eternity. Similarly, a spaceship appears forever immovable at the event horizon in Brian Aldiss's 1976 short story "The Dark Soul of the Night". In Frederik Pohl's 1977 novel Gateway, an astronaut is wracked with survivor's guilt over the deaths of his companions during an encounter with a black hole, compounded by the process appearing to still be ongoing. Later sequels in Pohl's Heechee Saga, from the 1980 novel Beyond the Blue Event Horizon onward, portray time dilation being exploited by aliens who reside near a black hole to experience the passage of time more slowly than the rest of the universe; other aliens do likewise in David Brin's 1984 short story "The Crystal Spheres" while waiting for the universe to be more filled with life. In Alastair Reynolds's 2000 novel Revelation Space, aliens use the relativistic effect to hide. In Bill Johnson's 1982 short story "Meet Me at Apogee", travel to various levels of time dilation is commercialized and used by people with incurable diseases, among others. In the 2014 film Interstellar, a planet orbits a black hole so closely that it experiences extreme time dilation, with time passing approximately 60,000 times slower than on Earth.

== Space travel ==
Black holes have also been portrayed as ways to travel through space. In particular, they often serve as a means to achieve faster-than-light travel. The proposed mechanism involves travelling through the singularity at the center of a black hole and emerging at some other, perhaps very distant, place in the universe. More exotically, the point of emergence is occasionally portrayed as another point in time—thus enabling time travel—or even an entirely different universe. To explain why the immense gravitational field of the black hole does not crush the travellers and their vessels, the special theorized properties of rotating black holes are sometimes invoked by authors; astrophysicists Steven D. Bloom and Andrew May argue that the strong tidal forces would nevertheless invariably be fatal, May pointing specifically to spaghettification. According to The Encyclopedia of Science Fiction, early stories employing black holes for this purpose tended to use alternative terminology to obfuscate the underlying issues. Thus, Joe Haldeman's 1974 fix-up novel The Forever War, where a network of black holes is used for interstellar warfare, calls them "collapsars", while George R. R. Martin's 1972 short story "The Second Kind of Loneliness" has a "nullspace vortex".

Speculation that black holes might be connected to their hypothetical opposites, white holes, followed in the 1970s—the resulting arrangement being known as a wormhole. Wormholes were appealing to writers due to their relative theoretical plausibility as a means of faster-than-light travel, and they were further popularized by speculative works of non-fiction such as Adrian Berry's 1977 book The Iron Sun: Crossing the Universe Through Black Holes. Black holes and associated wormholes thus quickly became commonplace in fiction; according to science fiction scholar Brian Stableford, writing in the 2006 work Science Fact and Science Fiction: An Encyclopedia, "wormholes became the most fashionable mode of interstellar travel in the last decades of the twentieth century". Ian Wallace's 1979 novel Heller's Leap is a murder mystery involving a journey through a black hole. Joan D. Vinge's 1980 novel The Snow Queen is set on a circumbinary planet where a black hole between the binary stars serves as the gateway between the system and the outside world, while Paul Preuss's 1980 novel The Gates of Heaven and its 1981 follow-up Re-Entry feature black holes that are used for travel through both space and time. In the 1989 anime film Garaga, human colonization of the cosmos is enabled by interstellar gateways associated with black holes. The entire Earth is transported through a wormhole in Roger MacBride Allen's 1990 novel The Ring of Charon. Travel between universes is depicted in Pohl and Jack Williamson's 1991 novel The Singers of Time, the concept having earlier made a more fanciful appearance in the 1975 film The Giant Spider Invasion, where the spiders of the title arrive at Earth through a black hole. In the 2009 film Star Trek, a black hole created to neutralize a supernova threat has the side-effect of transporting two nearby spaceships into the past, where they end up altering the course of history. In Bolivian science fiction writer Giovanna Rivero's 2012 novel Helena 2022: La vera crónica de un naufragio en el tiempo, a spaceship ends up in 1630s Italy as a result of an accidental encounter with a black hole.

== Small and large ==
Black holes need not necessarily be stellar-mass; the decisive factor is whether sufficient mass is contained within a small enough space—the Schwarzschild radius. The principal mechanism of black hole formation is the gravitational collapse of a massive star, but other origins have been hypothesized, including so-called primordial black holes forming shortly after the Big Bang. Primordial black holes could theoretically be of virtually any conceivable size, though the smallest ones would by now have evaporated into nothing due to the quantum mechanical effect known as Hawking radiation.

The concept of micro black holes was first theorized scientifically in the 1970s, and quickly became popular in science fiction. In Larry Niven's 1974 short story "The Hole Man", a microscopic black hole is used as a murder weapon by exploiting the tidal effects at short range, and in Niven's 1975 short story "The Borderland of Sol", one is used by space pirates to capture spaceships. Small black holes are used to power spaceship propulsion in Arthur C. Clarke's 1975 novel Imperial Earth, Charles Sheffield's 1978 short story "Killing Vector", and the 1997 film Event Horizon. Artificial black holes that are created unintentionally at nuclear facilities appear in Michael McCollum's 1979 short story "Scoop" and Martin Caidin's 1980 novel Star Bright. In David Langford's 1982 novel The Space Eater, a small black hole is used as a weapon against a rebellious planet. Earth is endangered by miniature black holes in Gregory Benford's 1985 novel Artifact, Thomas Thurston Thomas's 1986 novel The Doomsday Effect, and Brin's 1990 novel Earth, and the planet's destruction in this way forms part of the backstory in Dan Simmons's 1989 novel Hyperion, while the Moon's destruction by a small black hole is depicted in Paul J. McAuley's 1990 short story "How We Lost the Moon" and is suspected to have occurred in Neal Stephenson's 2015 novel Seveneves. Small black holes are used as a way to provide an artificial gravity of sorts by placing them inside inhabited structures or settled asteroids in Sheffield's 1989 novel Proteus Unbound, Reynolds's 2008 novel House of Suns, and Iain M. Banks's 2010 novel Surface Detail. The titular material in Wil McCarthy's 2000 novel The Collapsium is made up of a lattice of micro black holes and makes teleportation possible.

At the opposite end of the spectrum, black holes can have masses comparable to that of an entire galaxy. Supermassive black holes, with masses that can be in excess of billions of times the mass of the Sun, are thought to exist in the center of most galaxies. Sufficiently large and massive black holes would have a low average density and could theoretically contain intact stars and planets within their event horizons. An enormous low-density black hole of this kind appears in Barry N. Malzberg's 1975 novel Galaxies. In Benford's Galactic Center Saga, starting with the 1977 novel In the Ocean of Night, the vicinity of the supermassive black hole at the Galactic Center of the Milky Way makes an attractive destination for spacefaring civilizations due to the high concentration of stars that can serve as sources of energy in the region; a similar use is found for a regular-sized black hole in Benford's 1986 short story "As Big as the Ritz", where its accretion disk provides ample solar energy for a space habitat. McAuley's 1991 novel Eternal Light involves a journey to the central supermassive black hole to investigate a hypervelocity star on a trajectory towards the Solar System. According to The Encyclopedia of Science Fiction, "the immense black hole at the galactic core has become almost a cliché of contemporary space opera" such as Greg Egan's 2008 novel Incandescence.

== Hazards to spacefarers ==
The pulp-era motif of black holes posing danger to spacefarers resurfaced decades later, following the popularization of black holes in fiction. In the 1975 Space: 1999 episode "Black Sun", one threatens to destroy the Moon as it travels through space; the episode was one of those included in Edwin Charles Tubb's 1975 novelization Breakaway. In Isaac Asimov's 1976 short story "Old-fashioned", astronauts surmise that an unseen object keeping them in orbit must be a modestly-sized black hole, having wreaked havoc with their spaceship through tidal forces. In Edward Bryant's 1976 novel Cinnabar, a computer self-destructs by intentionally entering a black hole. In Mildred Downey Broxon's 1978 short story "Singularity", scientists study a civilization on a planet that will shortly be destroyed by an approaching black hole. John Varley's 1978 short story "The Black Hole Passes" depicts an outpost in the Oort cloud being imperiled by a small black hole. In Stephen Baxter's 1993 short story "Pilot", a spaceship extracts energy from a rotating black hole's ergosphere to widen its event horizon and cause a pursuer to fall into it. Black holes also appear as obstacles in the 2007 video game Super Mario Galaxy.

== Interior ==
Because what lies beyond the event horizon is unknown and by definition unobservable from outside, authors have been free to employ artistic license when depicting the interiors of black holes. The 1979 film The Black Hole, noted for its inaccurate portrayal of the known properties of black holes, depicts the inside as an otherworldly place bearing the hallmarks of Christian conceptions of the afterlife. In Benford's 1990 novel Beyond the Fall of Night, a sequel to Clarke's 1948 novel Against the Fall of Night, the inside of a black hole is used as a prison, a role it also serves in Alan Moore and Dave Gibbons's 1985 Superman comic book story "For the Man Who Has Everything". Alien lifeforms inhabit the interior of a black hole in McCarthy's 1995 novel Flies from the Amber. Expeditions into black holes to explore the interior are depicted in Geoffrey A. Landis's 1998 short story "Approaching Perimelasma" and Egan's 1998 short story "The Planck Dive".

== Sentient ==
In much the same way as stars—and, to a lesser extent, planets—have been anthropomorphized as living and thinking beings, so have black holes. An intelligent, talking black hole appears in Varley's 1977 short story "Lollipop and the Tar Baby". In Sheffield's Proteus Unbound, microscopic black holes are determined to contain intelligence through signals emanating from them. In Benford's 2000 novel Eater, a black hole that is sentient as a result of electromagnetic interactions in its accretion disk seeks to devour the Solar System.

== See also ==
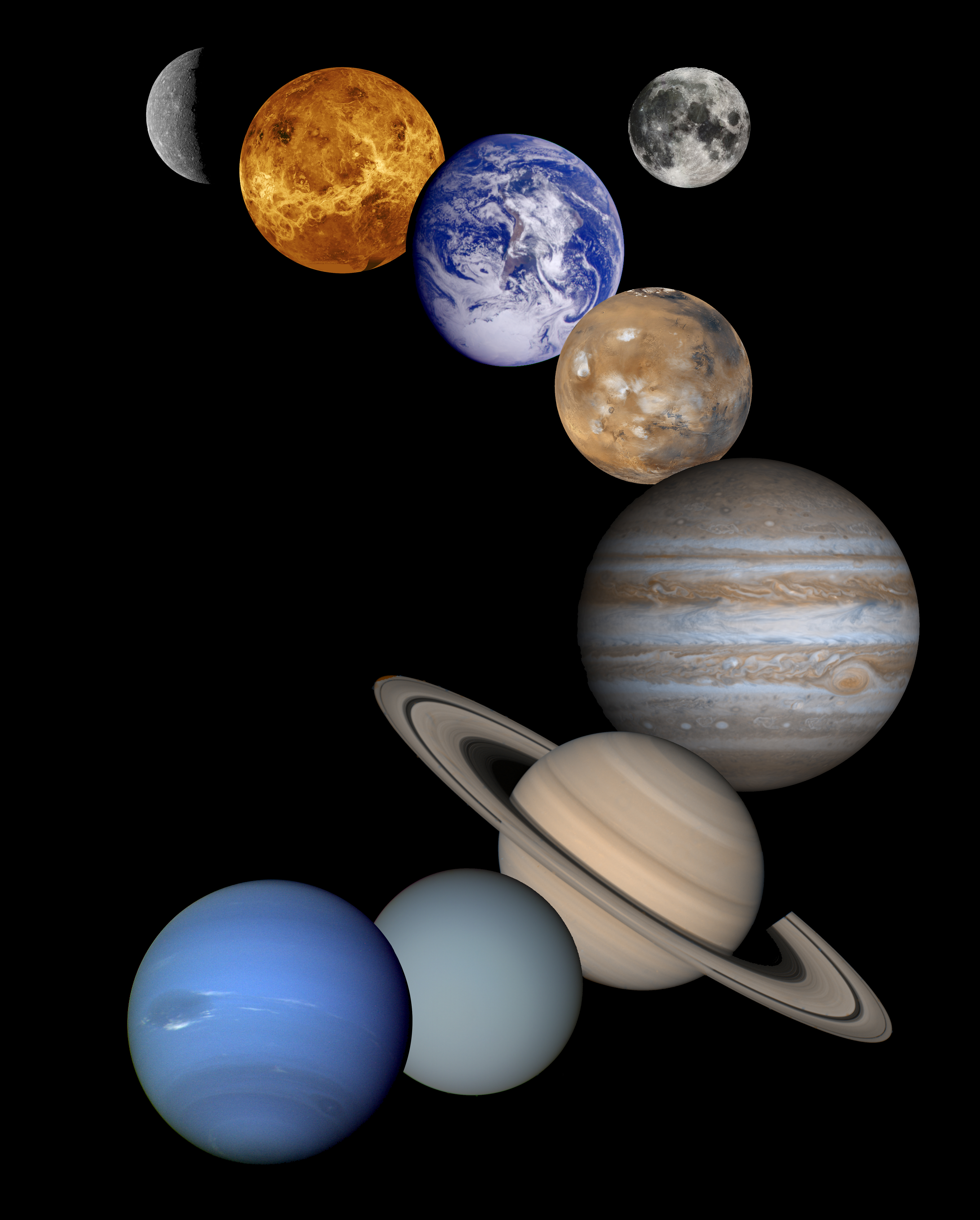
Clicking on a planet leads to the article about its depiction in fiction.

- Neutron stars in fiction
- Stars in fiction
- Supernovae in fiction
