= Dragon's Egg =

1980 hard science fiction novel by Robert L. Forward

- First edition cover
- Author: Robert L. Forward
- Cover artist: Darrell K. Sweet
- Language: English
- Series: Cheela
- Genre: Science fiction
- Publisher: Del Rey
- Publication date: 1980
- Publication place: United States
- Media type: Print (hardback & paperback)
- Pages: 345
- ISBN: 0-345-28646-4
- OCLC: 5410747
- Dewey Decimal: 813/.5/4
- LC Class: PS3556.O754 D7 1980
- Followed by: Starquake

Dragon's Egg is a 1980 hard science fiction novel by American writer Robert L. Forward. In the story, Dragon's Egg is a neutron star with a surface gravity 67 billion times that of Earth, and inhabited by cheela, intelligent creatures the size of sesame seeds who evolve, live, and think a million times faster than humans. Most of the novel, from May to June 2050, chronicles the cheela civilization beginning with its discovery of agriculture to advanced technology and its first face-to-face contact with humans, who are observing the hyper-rapid evolution of the cheela civilization from orbit around Dragon's Egg.

Dragon's Egg attempts to communicate unfamiliar ideas and imaginative scenes while giving adequate attention to the known scientific principles involved.

== Plot summary ==
=== The neutron star ===
Half a million years ago and 50 light-years from Earth, a star in the constellation Draco turns supernova, and the star's remnant becomes a neutron star. The radiation from the explosion causes mutations in many Earth organisms, including a group of hominina that become the ancestors of Homo sapiens. The star's short-lived plasma jets are lop-sided because of anomalies in its magnetic field, and set it on a course passing within 250 astronomical units of the Sun. In 2020 AD, human astronomers detect the neutron star, call it "Dragon's Egg", and in 2050 they send an expedition to explore it.

The star contains about half of a solar mass of matter, compressed into a diameter of about 20 kilometers (12 miles), making its surface gravity 67 billion times that of Earth. Its outer crust, compressed to about 7,000 kg per cubic centimeter, is mainly iron nuclei with a high concentration of neutrons, overlaid with about 1 millimeter (0.039 inches) of white dwarf star material. The atmosphere, mostly iron vapor, is about 5 centimeters (2.0 inches) thick. The star shrinks slightly as it cools, causing the crust to crack and produce mountains 5 to 100 millimeters (0.20 to 3.94 inches) high. Large volcanoes, formed by liquid material oozing from deep cracks, can be many centimeters high and over one hundred meters in diameter, eventually collapsing to cause starquakes.

Around 3000 BC Dragon's Egg cools enough to allow a stable equivalent of "chemistry", in which "compounds" are constructed of nuclei bound by the strong force, instead of atoms bound by the electromagnetic force. As the star's chemical processes are about one million times faster than Earth's, self-replicating "molecules" appear shortly and life begins on the star. As the star continues to cool, more complex life evolves, until plant-like organisms appear around 1000 BC. One lineage of these later became the first "animals", the earliest of which live by stealing seedpods from sessile organisms and later lineages becoming predators.

The adults of the star's most intelligent species, called cheela (no flexion for gender or number), have about the same mass as an adult human. However, the extreme gravity of Dragon's Egg compresses the cheela to the volume of a sesame seed, but with a flattened shape about 0.5 millimeters (0.020 inches) high and about 5 millimeters (0.20 inches) in diameter. Their eyes are 0.1 millimeters (0.0039 inches) wide. Such minute eyes can see clearly only in ultraviolet and, in good light, the longest wavelengths of the X-ray band.

=== Growth of civilization ===
Timeline
Time	Event
3000 BC	Life appears
1000 BC	"Plants"
	Animals
2032	First weapon
22 May 2050, 14:44:01	Invention of agriculture
22 May 2050, 14:44:01	Volcano emerges
22 May 2050, 14:44:01	Clan invents new foraging techniques
22 May 2050, 16:45:24	Volcano forces clan to find new territory
22 May 2050, 16:45:24	Invention of mathematics
22 May 2050, 16:45:24	Self-sacrifice of the aged saves the clan
	Organized religion among cheela
14 June 2050, 22:12:30	Cheela develop writing
20 June 2050, 06:48:48	Cheela build religious arena
20 June 2050, 06:48:48	Humans send first message to cheela
	Cheela recognize "digital" pictures of humans
20 June 2050, 07:58:24	First successful cheela transmission to humans
20 June 2050, 11:16:03	Cheela realized both races were created by same supernova
20 June 2050, 20:29:59	Cheela's first experiments in gravity manipulation
20 June 2050, 22:30:10	Cheela expedition to human spacecraft
21 June 2050, 06:13:54	Final communication between cheela and humans

In 2032, a cheela develops the race's first weapon and tactics while overcoming a dangerous predator. In November 2049 a human expedition to Dragon's Egg starts building orbital facilities. The rest of the story, including almost the whole history of cheela civilization, spans from 22 May 2050 to 21 June 2050. By humans' standards, a "day" on Dragon's Egg is about 0.2 seconds, and a typical cheela's lifetime is about 40 minutes.

One clan organizes the first cheela agriculture, which brings predictable food supply but provokes grumbling about the repetitive work. Shortly after, a volcano emerges in the area, and the clan invents the first sledge to carry food from more distant sources. However, within a few generations the volcano pollutes the soil. One clan leads its population on a long, arduous journey to new territory that is fertile and uninhabited. Although one genius invents mathematics to calculate and measure the band's food supply, the situation is desperate and the clan's survival depends on the self-sacrifice of the oldest members.

Over the course of generations, the cheela come to worship the humans' spacecraft as a god, and their records of its satellites' movements cause them to develop writing. Several generations later, the cheela build an arena to accommodate thousands of worshippers. The humans notice this novel and very regular feature, conclude that intelligent beings inhabit the star, and use a laser to send simple messages. Cheela astronomers gradually realize that these are diagrams of the spaceships, its satellites and its crew – impossibly spindly creatures, who communicate with frustrating slowness, and are apparently almost 10% as long as the cheela's great arena. A cheela engineer proposes to send messages to the humans. As her attempts to transmit from the civilization's territory are ineffective, she travels to a mountain range to transmit directly under the spacecraft – conquering the fear of heights that is instinctive for flattened creatures living in 67 billion g. The humans recognize her message and realize that the cheela live a million times faster than humans.

Since real-time conversations are impossible, the humans send sections of the expedition's library. After reading an astronomy article, a cheela realizes that the supernova half a million human years ago created both their races. Many cheela generations later, but only a few hours for humans, cheelas develop gravity manipulation. A few generations later, a cheela spacecraft visits the human one. Although they still need extreme gravity fields to survive, the cheela can now control them precisely enough for both races to see each other face-to-face in safety. The cheela have decided that transferring their technologies, now far advanced of humans', would stunt humanity's development. However the cheela leave clues in several challenging locations, before going their separate ways.

== Plot introduction ==
In Dragon's Egg, Forward describes the history and development of a life form (the Cheela) that evolves on the surface of a neutron star (a highly dense collapsed star, about 20 km in diameter). This is the "dragon's egg" of the title, so named because from Earth it is observed to be near the tail of the constellation Draco ("the dragon"). The Cheela develop sentience and intelligence, despite their relative small size (an individual Cheela has approximately the volume of a sesame seed, but the mass of a human) and an intense gravity field that restricts their movement in the third dimension. Much of the book concerns the biologic and social development of the Cheela; a subplot is the arrival of a human vessel nearby the neutron star, and the eventual contact that is made between the humans and the Cheela. A major problem in this contact is that the Cheela live a million times more quickly than humans do; a Cheela year goes by in about 30 human seconds.

The humans arrive when the Cheela are a savage, backward species, fighting rival clans in a subsistence-level society. Within a few human days, the equivalent of a few thousand Cheela years, the Cheela surpass the humans in technology, and the humans are affectionately called "the Slow Ones".

Forward wrote a sequel to Dragon's Egg, called Starquake, which deals with the consequences of the Cheela developing space travel, and of a seismic disturbance that kills most of the Cheela on the surface of the neutron star.

== Development history ==
Writer Robert L. Forward described being inspired by astronomer Frank Drake's suggestion in 1973 that intelligent life could inhabit neutron stars. Physical models in 1973 implied that Drake's creatures would be microscopic. By the time Forward was outlining the book, newer models indicated that the cheela would be about the size of sesame seeds. Later Forward found an earlier letter in which he discussed the idea of high-gravity life in the Sun with science fiction novelist Hal Clement.

Forward was the scientist and Larry Niven the author in a tutorial on science fiction writing, and later that evening Forward and Niven agreed to collaborate on a novel on aliens on a neutron star. However, Niven soon found himself too busy with Lucifer's Hammer, on which he was already co-writing with Jerry Pournelle. Forward wrote the first draft himself, but several publishers suggested the story should be rewritten by Niven or Pournelle – who were still busy. Finally editor Lester del Rey provided comments that guided Forward through two rewrites, and del Rey then bought the novel. Forward described the work as "a textbook on neutron star physics disguised as a novel".

=== Publication history ===
In English:

Date	Publisher	Format	ISBN
1980	Ballantine Books	Hardback	0345286464
1980	Ballantine Books	Paperback	034528349X
1988	New English Library Ltd.	Paperback	0450051978
1995	Ballantine Books	Paperback	0345316665
2000	Del Rey Impact	Paperback	034543529X

In other languages:

Language	Title	Date	Publisher	ISBN
Czech	Dračí vejce	1999	Polaris	0671721534
Finnish	Lohikäärmeen muna	1987	Tähtitieteellinen yhdistys Ursa	951926938X
French	L'œuf du dragon	1980, 1990	LGF	225304931X
German	Das Drachenei	1981	Bastei Lübbe	3404241304
Spanish	El Huevo del Dragón	1988	Ediciones B	8477359334

== Literary significance and reception ==
Quotes from the cover pages:

- "This is one for the real science-fiction fan. John Campbell would have loved it." – Frank Herbert
- "A gripping and logical account of the evolution of intelligence in an alien race." – Charles Sheffield
- "Bob Forward writes in the tradition of Hal Clement's Mission of Gravity and carries it a giant step (how else?) forward." – Isaac Asimov
- "Dragon's Egg is superb. I couldn't have written it; it required too much real physics." – Larry Niven

Science fiction critic John Clute wrote that the novel "generates a sense of wonder that is positively joyous", saying it was "a romance of science". Chris Aylott described it as "a minor classic of science fiction – one that shows off both the best and worst elements of hard SF. ... the ideas definitely come first." He found the writing of the human cast dull, but appreciated Forward's ability to share his fascination with the cheela and to create communications between races that lived at vastly different speeds.

Greg Costikyan reviewed Dragon's Egg in Ares Magazine #8 and commented that "Dragon's Egg is interesting because it is the epitome of what "hard" science fiction is all about – extrapolation of the most interesting facets of scientific knowledge and speculation."

Lambourne, Shallis, and Shortland consider that the research and detailed construction of the scenario make Dragon's Egg an excellent example of hard science fiction. Scientist Seth Shostak described the book's science as "fanciful but impossible to dismiss".

John Pierce also regarded Dragon's Egg as hard science fiction at its best, while Forward's later novel Martian Rainbow (1991) was the genre at its worst. Both novels have cardboard human characters, but this does not matter in Dragon's Egg, where the focus is on the deeper personalities of the cheela characters. The novel even makes readers care about the fate of an unsympathetic cheela ruler, whose rejuvenation treatment fails catastrophically. Pierce wrote that the best works of this genre create a literary experience, but one of an unusual kind. Instead of offering a metaphor for a reality the reader already recognizes, they create new realities in which the reader is caught up.

Robert Lambourne regards Forward, especially in Dragon's Egg, as the successor of Hal Clement, whose Mission of Gravity exemplifies the most strongly science-based science fiction. In Lambourne's opinion hard science fiction authors like Clement, Forward and their successors have been relatively few but have strongly influenced both the genre's evolution and the public's perception of the genre.

== Awards and nominations ==
Dragon's Egg won the 1981 Locus Award for First Novel and placed 14th in Locus' SF Novel category.

== Sequel ==
In 1985, Forward published Starquake, a sequel to Dragon's Egg. Lambourne, Shallis and Shortland consider Starquake's scientific background as rigorous as Dragon's Egg's. In this novel, a starquake disrupts cheela civilization, while humans aboard the spacecraft Dragon Slayer deal with their own problems.

== See also ==
- Neutron stars in fiction
- "Blink of an Eye", an episode of Star Trek: Voyager with a similar premise.
- Habitability of neutron star systems
