= Neutron Tide =

- Short story by Arthur C. Clarke
- Country: United Kingdom
- Language: English
- Genre: Science fiction

Publication
- Published in: Galaxy Science Fiction
- Publication date: May, 1970

"Neutron Tide" is a short story by British writer Arthur C. Clarke, first published in 1970 in Galaxy Science Fiction. It is among his shortest pieces of writing, consisting solely of a 2-page, detailed description of a futuristic scenario in order to use a pun as a punch-line, a play on the title of "The Star-Spangled Banner", the United States' national anthem. The story was reprinted later in the 1978 Starlord summer special.

== Plot summary ==
A space battleship flies too close to the gravitational field of a neutron star, and is subsequently torn to bits by the high tidal forces. A military commander reporting on this states that the only identifiable piece of debris was a mangled spanner.

== See also ==
- Neutron stars in fiction
- Feghoot – Short story designed to end with a pun
