= Starquake (novel) =

1985 novel by Robert L. Forward

- Cover of the first edition
- Author: Robert Forward
- Cover artist: Ralph McQuarrie
- Language: English
- Series: Cheela
- Genre: Science fiction
- Publisher: Del Rey Books
- Publication date: 1985
- Publication place: United States
- Media type: Print (hardback & paperback)
- Pages: 268 (paperback)
- ISBN: 0-595-16748-9
- OCLC: 53909583
- Preceded by: Dragon's Egg

Starquake is a science fiction novel by American writer Robert L. Forward, published in 1985. It is a sequel to his novel Dragon's Egg. It is about the life of the Cheela civilization, creatures who live on a neutron star named Dragon's Egg, struggling to recover from a disastrous starquake.

The novel was listed by theoretical physicist Sean M. Carroll as his favorite science fiction novel.

== Plot introduction ==
This story begins at the exact time that Dragon's Egg (its predecessor) ended. As the human scientists in the orbiting ship Dragon Slayer prepare to leave, the Cheela on the star below continue their rapid advance. Starquake centers around two crises. The first is when the human ship is damaged, and the Cheela must repair the ship before tidal forces kill the humans aboard. Then a catastrophic Starquake strikes. Cheela explorers in space survive but have lost the technology to land back on the surface of their world. All Cheela on the surface perish except for four individuals. All succeeding generations of surface Cheela are descended from these four individuals. For a while, the surface Cheela struggle to keep the rudiments of civilization, but eventually a barbarian conqueror arises. The Cheela in space and their human friends watch helplessly as a new dark age ensues.

The second half of the story tells the heroic tale of how the space-bound Cheela, with a little help from the humans, eventually are able to land again on the surface, defeat the barbarian tyrant, and start to rebuild Cheela civilization. The first edition cover (shown here) depicts the climactic final battle for the surface as described in the novel.

== See also ==
- Habitability of neutron star systems
- Neutron stars in fiction

== Sources ==
- Fantastic Fiction.co.uk Dragon's Egg
- Fantastic Fiction.co.uk Robert Forward
