= The State (Larry Niven) =

Fictional totalitarian world government

The State is a fictional totalitarian world government in a future history that forms the back-story of three of Larry Niven's novels: A World Out of Time (1976), The Integral Trees (1984), and The Smoke Ring (1987). It is also the setting of two short stories, "Rammer" (which became the first chapter of A World Out of Time) and "The Kiteman" (printed in N-Space), as well as a stalled fourth novel, The Ghost Ships. After several years in development, Niven announced that The Ghost Ships would never be made and wrote The Ringworld Throne instead. The novel would have focused on a race of self-aware natural Bussard ramjets birthed in the supernova that created Levoy's Star and were returning to their place of birth to mate. According to Playgrounds of the Mind, Kendy and the kite-fliers from "The Kiteman" would have returned also.

== Bibliography ==
Works set in the fictional universe The State:

- “Rammer” (1971 short story incorporated into A World Out of Time)
- “Down and Out” (1976 short story incorporated into A World Out of Time)
- “The Children of the State” (1976 serial novella incorporated into A World Out of Time)
- A World Out of Time (1976 fix-up novel)
- The Integral Trees (1984 novel)
- The Smoke Ring (1987 novel)
- “The Kiteman” (1990 short story collected in N-Space)
- The Ghost Ships (cancelled novel)

== Overview ==
Most information regarding the State comes from A World Out of Time, including a brief overview of its formation in the aftermath of two global brush-fire wars. The precise timeframe the State occupies is not defined. In A World Out of Time, the State exists as of 2190; Kendy notes that the State was established 455 years before Discipline reached the Smoke Ring (which itself was 512 years before The Integral Trees, 532 years before The Smoke Ring, and 580 years before "The Kiteman"). It rules over an extremely crowded world, in which privacy is no longer a concept. Religion (or at any rate Christianity) is apparently no longer in practice, as a corpsicle on the Discipline is noted as having to explain to others what a Christmas wreath is. A comment from Kendy in The Smoke Ring indicates that the State abolished capitalism when it was established. In The Smoke Ring, Kendy also states that as of the time when Discipline left Earth, the State had colonized all ten planets of the Solar System, thirty moons, and hundreds of asteroids, with twenty-eight extrasolar worlds in the process of terraforming. According to Niven, The Ghost Ships would have revealed that the State had split into two factions, the Inner State based in the Solar System and the Outer State based on the extrasolar colony worlds, which would have featured in the novel. This is also implied by a graphic presentation in A World Out Of Time, which the protagonist interprets as showing a distinction between "people, like us" (the Inner State) and "not people, not like us" (the colonies).

The State employs fusion-assisted interstellar spaceflight and technologies that enable personalities to be transferred chemically from one body to another. It may transfer personalities extracted from medically unsalvageable bodies of "corpsicles" frozen in the past to mindwiped criminals to use them as agents in circumstances where their free-thinking skills can still be useful to the State, such as in piloting ramships to other stars. The State has also perfected the storage of human personalities within AI systems, and can install copies of the personalities of "checkers" loyal to the State into the ramships' control computers, in order to keep a watch on potentially disloyal revived corpsicles.

The temporal dilation of the novel permits the protagonist of A World Out of Time a view of the State in several widely spaced time periods, over three million years. He describes it to his AI minder as a hydraulic empire, accounting for its very long life and stability. He claims that hydraulic empires only fall to barbarians from outside - but there is nothing "outside" of the State, which encompasses all of human civilization. It is eventually revealed that the State created its own "barbarians" by establishing colonies in other systems.

A World Out of Time was nominated for a Locus Award in 1977, and The Integral Trees won a Locus Award in 1985.
