= The Smoke Ring (novel) =

1987 novel by Larry Niven

- First edition
- Author: Larry Niven
- Cover artist: Michael Whelan
- Language: English
- Series: The State
- Genre: Science fiction
- Publisher: Del Rey Books
- Publication date: 1987
- Publication place: United States
- Media type: Print (hardback & paperback)
- Pages: 302
- ISBN: 0-345-30256-7
- Preceded by: The Integral Trees
- Followed by: "The Kiteman"

The Smoke Ring is a 1987 science fiction novel by Larry Niven. Like much of Niven's work, the story is heavily influenced by the setting: a gas torus, a ring of air around a neutron star. It is a sequel to The Integral Trees.

== Setting ==
The story is set at the fictional neutron star Levoy's Star (abbreviated "Voy"). The gas giant Goldblatt's World (abbreviated "Gold") orbits the star just outside its Roche limit. While Gold's gravity is enough to keep it from being pulled apart by Voy's tidal forces, it is insufficient to hold its atmosphere, which has been pulled loose into an independent orbit around Voy. This orbiting air forms a ring known as a gas torus. The gas torus is huge—one million kilometers thick—but most of it is too thin to be habitable. The central part of the Gas Torus, where the air is thicker, is known as the Smoke Ring. The Smoke Ring supports a wide variety of life. Robert L. Forward helped Niven calculate the parameters of the ring.

There is no "ground" in the Smoke Ring; it is a world consisting entirely of sky. Thus, most animals can fly, even the fish. Furthermore, since the Smoke Ring is in orbit, it is in free fall. There is no "up" or "down", only "in" or "out" from Voy. Humans moving in the Smoke Ring use a poetic adage to aid their understanding of orbital mechanics: "East takes you Out, Out takes you West, West takes you In, In takes you East. Port and Starboard bring you back". (In the novel, the characters also say: "North and South bring you back".)

Illustration of an "Integral Tree"

Most animals have trilateral symmetry, allowing them to see in all directions. Most plants in the Smoke Ring are quite fragile, as they do not have to support their own weight. A notable exception to this rule are the Integral Trees. These are trees that are up to 100 kilometers long. Tidal locking causes them to be oriented radially, with one end pointing in toward Voy and one end pointing out. The ends of the tree experience a tidal force of up to 1/5 g. Each end consists of a leafy "tuft", which is where photosynthesis occurs.

Each tuft of a tree is 50 kilometers from the tree's center of mass. Thus, a tuft is either orbiting too slowly (the in tuft) or too quickly (the out tuft). Since the atmosphere at either end is moving at its local orbital speed, the ends of trees are subject to a constant hurricane-force wind. This wind bends the ends into the shape of an integral symbol: ∫.

The Smoke Ring was colonized 500 years prior to the beginning of the story by a crew of 20 astronauts. Their descendants have adapted to the free-fall environment by growing taller and developing prehensile toes.

According to N-Space, the wings and the method of self-propelled flying featured in the novel were suggested by Isaac Asimov.

== Plot summary ==
This book takes place about fifteen years after the end of the original story, when survivors of the Dalton-Quinn tree, a few Carther States jungle dwellers, and two London Tree Citizens have settled on a new tree. This 'Citizen's Tree' has become a stable community which some believe may be too small to survive in the long run.

Kendy, the recorded personality of a citizen of "The State" who exists in the computer of the original space-ship that colonized the Smoke Ring, has become impatient. He decides to re-establish contact with Citizen's Tree. Kendy manipulates a group into making contact with "The Admiralty", a neighboring civilization at Gold's L4 Lagrange Point (which they refer to as "the Clump"). The group explores this more advanced civilization with a mixture of wonder and trepidation.

Although much of the story is a sort of "travelogue" exploring the Smoke Ring and the technology used in the unique environment, The Smoke Ring does spend more time on story and character development than The Integral Trees. One of the drivers for the story follows the latest operator of "the silver suit", the Citizen's Tree's working spacesuit. Few are capable of operating the suit due to its size; due to the lack of gravity, most humans in the Smoke Ring grow too tall to fit into it. The job goes to the occasionally born "dwarves" who tend to develop into humans of Earth-normal height and build. A major sub-plot develops around the latest silver suit operator's attempts to infiltrate The Admiralty to gain information, and The Admiralty's near obsession with capturing the Citizen's Tree's spacesuit.

This focuses on the story of Kendy and the original mission. The chain of events that led to the colonization of the Smoke Ring through a "mutiny" on the ship is explored. After retrieving the crew's own records of the events, Kendy realizes that the crew had not mutinied at all, and that he had forced them off the ship, believing this to be in keeping with his orders from Earth. This was apparently blocked from his memory, and he suffers a form of breakdown when he learns (or re-learns) the truth.

== Literary significance and reception ==
The Magill Book Reviews said in 1990 that "the societies and science in the book are very well-researched. It is, however, a "hard" science fiction novel, and it has the weakness endemic to that genre – the individual characters are never satisfyingly drawn, so that the reader is somewhat distanced from them."

The Library Journal said in 1987 that "the alien topography of this sequel to The Integral Trees serves as a fascinating contrast to the persistence of humanity's adventuring spirit".

J. Michael Caparula reviewed The Smoke Ring in Space Gamer/Fantasy Gamer No. 81. Caparula commented that "The setting is, naturally, spectacular, but a lot of the freshness has worn off. Ringworld merited a sequel, The Integral Trees did not."

== See also ==
- Neutron stars in fiction

== Sources ==
- Larry Niven (1984). The Integral Trees. Del Rey. ISBN 0-345-32065-4.
