= Fictional encyclopaedism =

Literary concept

Fictional encyclopaedism is a term used in literary studies to refer to a style of fiction writing where an author amasses an exhaustive amount of detail about a fictional world to include in or prepare for writing a work of fiction. It is not to be confused with fictional encyclopedias such as the Encyclopedia Galactica, Tlön, Uqbar, Orbis Tertius, and The Hitchhiker's Guide to the Galaxy.

James Joyce's Finnegans Wake and Herman Melville's Moby-Dick are examples of fictional encyclopaedism due to their didactic tone and reach for infinite inclusiveness and encyclopedic range of topics with essay-like text.

Peter Wilkins stresses the conveyance of vast amount of information and the attempt at nearly exhaustive coverage of subject matter.
