= Exodus (Stargate SG-1) =

- Stargate SG-1 episode
- Episode no.: Season 4 Episode 22
- Directed by: David Warry-Smith
- Written by: Joseph Mallozzi and Paul Mullie
- Production code: 422
- Original air date: February 14, 2001

Guest appearances
- Carmen Argenziano as Jacob Carter/Selmak; Peter Wingfield as Tanith; Peter Williams as Apophis; Renton Reid as Red Jaffa; Paul Norman as Apophis' Red Guard; Kirsten Williamson as Tokra #1; Anastasia Bandey as Tokra #2

Episode chronology
← Previous "Double Jeopardy"	Next → "Enemies"
- Stargate SG-1 (season 4)

"Exodus" is the season 4 finale episode of the science fiction television series Stargate SG-1 and part one of a three-part story arc. This episode was nominated for an Emmy in the category "Outstanding Special Visual Effects for a Series".

== Summary ==
A Goa'uld Ha'tak appears in orbit of the planet Vorash, the current main base of the Tok'ra. SG-1 (having obtained the mothership in Double Jeopardy) transports down, much to Tanith's surprise. Col. O'Neill and Teal'c meet with the council to discuss the imminent relocation of the Tok'ra. When Tanith asks why he was not informed of this, they reveal to Tanith that they knew all along about him being a traitor, and have used him to funnel misinformation to Apophis. He is then imprisoned and Teal'c visits him. He informs him about what will happen to him and they also talk about Shan'auc.

On the ship the Tok'ra prepare to evacuate while Jacob talks with Jack about the ship and the Goa'uld. In his cell Tanith talks with a guard and then breaks down. When the guards enter the cell he kills them and flees. He returns to the surface and uses a Goa'uld long range communication device to contact Apophis. Teal'c then searches for him together with the Tok'ra. Meanwhile, Jack and Daniel are informed by Major Carter and Jacob that Apophis is coming and that they plan to destroy his fleet by blowing up the star of the planetary system. This will be done by launching the Stargate into the star while it is connected to P3W-451 – a planet where they previously found a black hole (See "A Matter of Time"). The gate will suck in enough mass from the star to cause it to supernova. Jack agrees to the plan. Later Daniel talks with Teal'c about his revenge on Tanith.

After the Tok'ra are all evacuated, SG-1 and Jacob fly to the star where they are able to dial P3W-451. They then launch the stargate into the star and plan to flee. Suddenly an Al'kesh, a Goa'uld mid-range bomber, de-cloaks and attacks. Although Teal'c fires back he can only make one hit. Finally the Al'kesh is able to damage the ship, so that they can't enter hyperspace. Jack and Teal'c then board a Death glider to fly to the Al'kesh but before they can shoot it returns to the planet. Teal'c follows it, despite Jack's worries. On the Ha'tak, Jacob and Sam start to repair their systems. At the planet Teal'c and Jack are able to destroy the Al'kesh (much to Tanith's shock, who was waiting for it on the planet) but they are caught in the explosion. Jack can only send an emergency call to the Ha'tak, where Jacob and Sam are partly successful with their repairs.

Back on the planet Jack and Teal'c are unharmed when the glider crash lands, and go to the Tok'ra base. However, Apophis' fleet appears, and Apophis sends two Jaffa to Tanith. Back on the ship the repairs are complete and they hide from Apophis. On the planet, Teal'c is shot with a staff weapon and captured by Tanith, who brings him to Apophis. Jack is stunned by Tanith's Zat, but is able to wound him in return. Teal'c mocks Apophis, telling him that the Tok'ra escaped.

Jacob launches all the Hatak's gliders, which are programmed to flee the system. Apophis follows them but soon realizes that it was a trick. In the meantime Jack is rescued from the planet by his teammates. Finally, the star explodes and SG-1 escapes, while Apophis' fleet is destroyed. SG-1's flight through hyperspace is interrupted and when they arrive, they realize that they have crossed four million light years. Apophis' mothership appears, trapped with them far from home.

== Reception ==
This episode was nominated for an Emmy in the category "Outstanding Special Visual Effects for a Series".
