= Stargate SG-1 season 4 =

Season of television series

Stargate SG-1
- Season 4
- DVD cover
- Starring: Richard Dean Anderson; Michael Shanks; Amanda Tapping; Christopher Judge; Don S. Davis
- No. of episodes: 22

Release
- Original network: Showtime
- Original release: June 30, 2000 – February 14, 2001

Season chronology
- ← Previous; Season 3 Next → Season 5

The fourth season of Stargate SG-1, an American-Canadian television series, began airing on June 30, 2000 on Showtime. The fourth season concluded after 22 episodes on February 14, 2001 on British Sky One, which overtook Showtime in mid-season. The series was developed by Brad Wright and Jonathan Glassner. Season four regular cast members include Richard Dean Anderson, Michael Shanks, Amanda Tapping, with Christopher Judge, and Don S. Davis.

== Production and release ==
In the scene in "Divide and Conquer" that flashes back to the events in Upgrades, where Carter and O'Neill are trapped on opposite sides of the forcefield, lines were written but the actors chose not to say them. In "Watergate", melted toxic wax was used to give Maybourne a frozen look. Tom McBeath couldn't breathe it in or would have risked his own health. The actual ending of the episode where O'Neill proposes that the two races had just exchanged hostages was not the intended ending, which is why the episode appears to end so abruptly. In "Beneath the Surface", Thera and Jonah were supposed to kiss to confirm that they were in a relationship, but this was dropped because O'Neill had already kissed Carter earlier in the season in "Window of Opportunity".

"Chain Reaction" made many references to the movie The Silence of the Lambs. As Lecter does with Clarice in the movie, Harry Maybourne refers to quid pro quo, should O'Neill really want to get help from him. Another reference is the final telephonic conversation between O'Neill and Maybourne, the latter calling from an exotic place, just as Lecter called Clarice Starling at the end of The Silence of the Lambs. "Double Jeopardy" is the only Stargate SG-1 episode directed by actor Michael Shanks. This episode serves as a sequel to the Season 1 episode "Tin Man", where the robotic SG-1 team first appeared. The artificial Daniel Jackson wears a bandana covering his hair, as he was created when Daniel (and Shanks) had long hair. "Exodus" is the last season finale that ends on a cliffhanger until Season Nine's "Camelot".

"Small Victories" was nominated for a 2001 Emmy Award in the category "Outstanding Special Visual Effects for a Series" and a 2001 Gemini Award in the category "Best Visual Effects". "Tangent" was nominated for a Gemini Award in the category "Best Visual Effects". "The Curse" was nominated for a Leo Award in the category "Best Visual Effects of Dramatic Series" "The Light" won a Leo Award in the category "Best Production Design of Dramatic Series". "Exodus" was nominated for an Emmy Award in the category "Outstanding Special Visual Effects for a Series".

== Main cast ==
- Starring Richard Dean Anderson as Colonel Jack O'Neill
- Michael Shanks as Dr. Daniel Jackson
- Amanda Tapping as Major Samantha Carter
- With Christopher Judge as Teal'c
- And Don S. Davis as Major General George Hammond

== Episodes ==
Episodes in bold are continuous episodes, where the story spans over 2 or more episodes.

| No. overall | No. in season | Title | Directed by | Written by | Original release date |
|---|---|---|---|---|---|
| 67 | 1 | "**Small Victories**" | Martin Wood | Robert C. Cooper | June 30, 2000 |
The Replicator on Earth has reproduced and taken over a submarine; O'Neill and Teal'c neutralise the threat. Carter goes with Thor to defend the Asgard homeworld from the Replicators. They use the Asgard's newest ship (named the O'Neill) to lure the Replicators into hyperspace, where the ship is blown up.
| 68 | 2 | "The Other Side" | Peter DeLuise | Brad Wright | July 7, 2000 |
Humans on the planet Euronda contact Stargate Command for help; they are fighting a losing war against an enemy they call the "Breeders" and have run out of food and fuel supplies. SG-1 travels to Euronda and make an alliance to trade heavy water for advanced technology to combat the Goa'uld. But SG-1 discovers their new allies are guilty of mass genocide against the "Breeders". SG-1 then sabotages the base and it is destroyed.
| 69 | 3 | "Upgrades" | Martin Wood | David Rich | July 14, 2000 |
The Tok'ra Anise gives Atanik arm devices to O'Neill, Carter, and Daniel that greatly increase their strength and speed. But the devices rely on a virus that is eventually neutralized by the human immune system, causing the members of SG-1 to lose the strength they gained. However, they don't realize this until they are on a mission on PX9-757, a planet where Apophis builds a new prototype mothership.
| 70 | 4 | "Crossroads" | Peter DeLuise | Katharyn Powers | July 21, 2000 |
The SGC is visited by Shan'auc, a female Jaffa who has discovered how to communicate with her larval Goa'uld symbiote and claims that she has information that could destroy the Goa'uld.
| 71 | 5 | "Divide and Conquer" | Martin Wood | Tor Alexander Valenza | July 28, 2000 |
The Goa'uld can impose subconscious programming on humans. The Tok'ra have a test to detect this by detecting lies. When it is applied to the staff of Stargate Command, Carter and O'Neill are found to be affected, supposedly in the episode "Upgrades". However, it is discovered that Carter and O'Neill are subconsciously failing the test because of their suppressed feelings for each other. They realize and correct their mistake.
| 72 | 6 | "Window of Opportunity" | Peter DeLuise | Joseph Mallozzi & Paul Mullie | August 4, 2000 |
After an encounter with an Ancient time device on P4X-639, O'Neill and Teal'c get trapped in a time loop that only they know about.
| 73 | 7 | "Watergate" | Martin Wood | Robert C. Cooper | August 11, 2000 |
The Russians have been using the second Stargate in secret, but after dialing a world that is completely under water, they lose contact with their Stargate facility and approach Stargate Command for help. The reason is discovered to be microscopic beings that live in, and control, water. They break free and attempt to return home through the Stargate by controlling human bodies and emitting enough energy to keep a Stargate open indefinitely.
| 74 | 8 | "The First Ones" | Peter DeLuise | Peter DeLuise | August 18, 2000 |
While helping with the excavation of fossilized Goa'ulds on P3X-888, the homeworld of the Goa'uld and the Unas, Daniel Jackson is captured by the Unas named Chaka. The rest of SG-1 tries to find and rescue him.
| 75 | 9 | "Scorched Earth" | Martin Wood | Joseph Mallozzi & Paul Mullie | August 25, 2000 |
Earth resettles a group of Enkaran refugees, a race of humans who have become specifically adapted to their homeworld and thus require exact environmental conditions, to another planet, but an alien spaceship is xenoforming the new planet into a hostile environment.
| 76 | 10 | "Beneath the Surface" | Peter DeLuise | Heather E. Ash | September 1, 2000 |
SG-1 have had their memories altered, and been press-ganged to work in an underground industrial complex to save a city from an ice age. They must recover their memories in order to escape.
| 77 | 11 | "Point of No Return" | William Gereghty | Joseph Mallozzi & Paul Mullie | September 8, 2000 |
An odd man called Martin Lloyd has inexplicable knowledge of the Stargate and claims that he is from outer space. He remembers his home address. He turns out to belong to a small group of men who deserted their homeworld after losing a war against the Goa'uld. After failing to find anything but more hardship, they chose to desert the rest of their race and hide out on Earth.
| 78 | 12 | "Tangent" | Peter DeLuise | Michael Cassutt | September 15, 2000 |
Teal'c and O'Neill test-fly the first experimental aircraft based on combined Earth and Goa'uld technologies, but soon a hidden trap in the aircraft takes control of the X-301 and propels it to the open space. Sam and Daniel enlist Jacob/Selmak's help to rescue them before their air is depleted.
| 79 | 13 | "The Curse" | Andy Mikita | Joseph Mallozzi & Paul Mullie | September 22, 2000 |
Daniel's old archaeology professor has died. Daniel goes to the funeral and discovers a controversy surrounding the professor's death. SG-1 discovers that a Goa'uld, Osiris, has escaped from an ancient canopic jar the professor's team was studying.
| 80 | 14 | "The Serpent's Venom" | Martin Wood | Peter DeLuise | September 29, 2000 |
The Tok'ra and Stargate Command want to sabotage a meeting of Heru'ur and Apophis, who seek to form an alliance on a planet that is surrounded by an old minefield. The team must rig one of the mines to spark a fight between the two System Lords so they destroy each other. SG-1 discovers Heru'ur has captured Teal'c and intends to use him as a peace offering. Jacob/Selmak plans to meet Teal'c and Rak'nor, a supposed friend of Teal'c's on the inside, on the third moon of the planet Tichenor.
| 81 | 15 | "Chain Reaction" | Martin Wood | Joseph Mallozzi & Paul Mullie | December 13, 2000 (Sky One); January 5, 2001 (Showtime) |
Hammond abruptly resigns as head of the SGC, and is replaced by General Bauer. O'Neill suspects there is more to it than Hammond will admit and refuses to let the matter rest. While General Bauer is planning to make a naqahdah bomb and test it, dooming the SGC, O'Neill teams up with Harry Maybourne to get Hammond reinstated.
| 82 | 16 | "2010" | Andy Mikita | Brad Wright | January 3, 2001 (Sky One); January 12, 2001 (Showtime) |
In an alternate future, Earth has defeated the Goa'uld with the help of the Aschen, a bland and humorless advanced people from a world designated P4C-970. Earth discovers too late that the Aschen plan to depopulate the planet by secretly sterilizing much of the population through life-extending drugs. Thus, the former members of SG-1 sacrifice their lives to send a warning back in time to themselves not to contact the Aschen homeworld P4C-970. The season 5 episode "2001" resumes this story.
| 83 | 17 | "Absolute Power" | Peter DeLuise | Robert C. Cooper | January 19, 2001 |
The Harcesis has come to visit the SGC and puts Jackson in a coma-like state. Jackson experiences what it means to have all the knowledge of the Goa'uld, and their ruthlessness.
| 84 | 18 | "The Light" | Peter F. Woeste | James Phillips | January 26, 2001 |
SG-1 discovers a world abandoned by the Goa'uld where there is a room with a beautiful, mesmerizing light display. But the light may have an insidious effect.
| 85 | 19 | "Prodigy" | Peter DeLuise | Story by : Brad Wright, Joseph Mallozzi & Paul Mullie; Teleplay by : Joseph Mallozzi & Paul Mullie | February 2, 2001 |
Carter meets a brilliant USAF cadet while lecturing at the Air Force Academy, but the cadet has a problem with authority. Carter decides to show her there are possibilities she isn't aware of. On an off-world mission on M4C-862, a moon 42,000 light-years from Earth, energy-based creatures take a dislike to the Tau'ri and Carter and the cadet must work on a solution to get everyone home. This episode includes a cameo by General Michael E. Ryan, then Chief of Staff of the United States Air Force.
| 86 | 20 | "Entity" | Allan Lee | Peter DeLuise | February 9, 2001 |
Stargate Command sends a probe through the Stargate to P9C-372, a world inhabited by electronic lifeforms. Suddenly, the SGC base computer system is compromised by an apparently very advanced computer virus, which eventually displaces Samantha Carter's mind from her body.
| 87 | 21 | "Double Jeopardy" | Michael Shanks | Robert C. Cooper | February 16, 2001 |
After Cronus's army captures the android counterparts of SG-1 ("Tin Man") on the planet Juna (P3X-729), the members of the real SG-1 must work with their robot duplicates to free the planet.
| 88 | 22 | "**Exodus**" | David Warry-Smith | Joseph Mallozzi & Paul Mullie | February 23, 2001 |
Apophis is on his way to Vorash, the planet the Tok'ra are using as a base. Carter and Jacob/Selmak attempt to wipe out Apophis' fleet by sending a Stargate linked to a black hole into the local sun, in order to make it go supernova.
