= John Middleton Murry Jr. =

English writer (1926–2002)

John Middleton Murry Jr. (9 May 1926 – 29 April 2002) was an English writer who used the names Colin Murry and Richard Cowper.

== Early and personal life ==
Murry was the son of the writer John Middleton Murry and his second wife, Violet Le Maistre. His mother contracted pulmonary tuberculosis when Murry was 8 months old, and died just before his fifth birthday. Murry was nicknamed "Colin" by his grandmother, which later served as a semi-pseudonymous pen name for some of his books.

Murry attended Rendcomb College, a progressive school in Gloucestershire. He enlisted in the Royal Navy in 1944 and applied to join the Fleet Air Arm as a pilot, but was turned down on the grounds of poor eyesight and was never in combat.

After the war, he read Anglo-Saxon and English at Brasenose College, Oxford from where he graduated in 1949. He met Ruth Jezierski and married her in 1949. The couple had two daughters.

Murry died in 2002, four weeks after the death of his wife. His daughters said he died of a broken heart.

== Career ==
His first novel, the autobiographical The Golden Valley, was finished in 1954 but not published until 1958 under the name Colin Murry. Publication was delayed because of the harsh criticism he had received from his father after he showed it to him following its completion. Three more novels as Colin Murry followed, the last appearing in 1972.

In the 1960s he turned to science fiction and fantasy under the pen name of Richard Cowper and attained considerable popularity. Responses to his work in the genre were mixed, with readers liking his subtle, lyrical and moving stories, but some SF critics were less impressed. Martin Amis wrote a series of harsh reviews of the Cowper books, which Murry shrugged off, saying, "He grew up with a famous father too!"

His writing often aimed at direct, intense feeling, with little or none of the irony and cynicism characteristic of much twentieth-century literature. He retired from writing in 1986, stating that he had nothing more to say, and turned to painting and repairing Victorian chairs.

== Selected bibliography ==
As Colin Murry

- The Golden Valley (1953)
- Recollections of a Ghost (1960)
- A Path to the Sea (1961)
- Private View (1972)

As Richard Cowper

- Phoenix (1967)
- Breakthrough (1967)
- Domino (1971)
- Kuldesak (1972)
- Clone (1973)
- Time Out of Mind, with W. R. Cowper (1973)
- The Twilight of Briareus (1974)
- Worlds Apart (1974)
- Profundis (1979)
- The White Bird of Kinship
  - The Road to Corlay (1978)
  - A Dream of Kinship (1981)
  - A Tapestry of Time (1982)

(The novella "Piper at the Gates of Dawn" acts as a prologue to the three Kinship novels. It appears in the collection The Custodians as well as in some editions of The Road to Corlay.)

- Shades of Darkness (1986)

Autobiography

- One Hand Clapping: a memoir of childhood (1975)
- Shadows on the Grass (1977)

Short-story collections

- The Custodians (1976)
- The Web of the Magi (1980)
- Out There Where the Big Ships Go (1980)
- The Tithonian Factor (1984)
- The Magic Spectacles: And Other Tales (1986)
