= Gas torus =

Toroidal cloud of gas or plasma around a planet

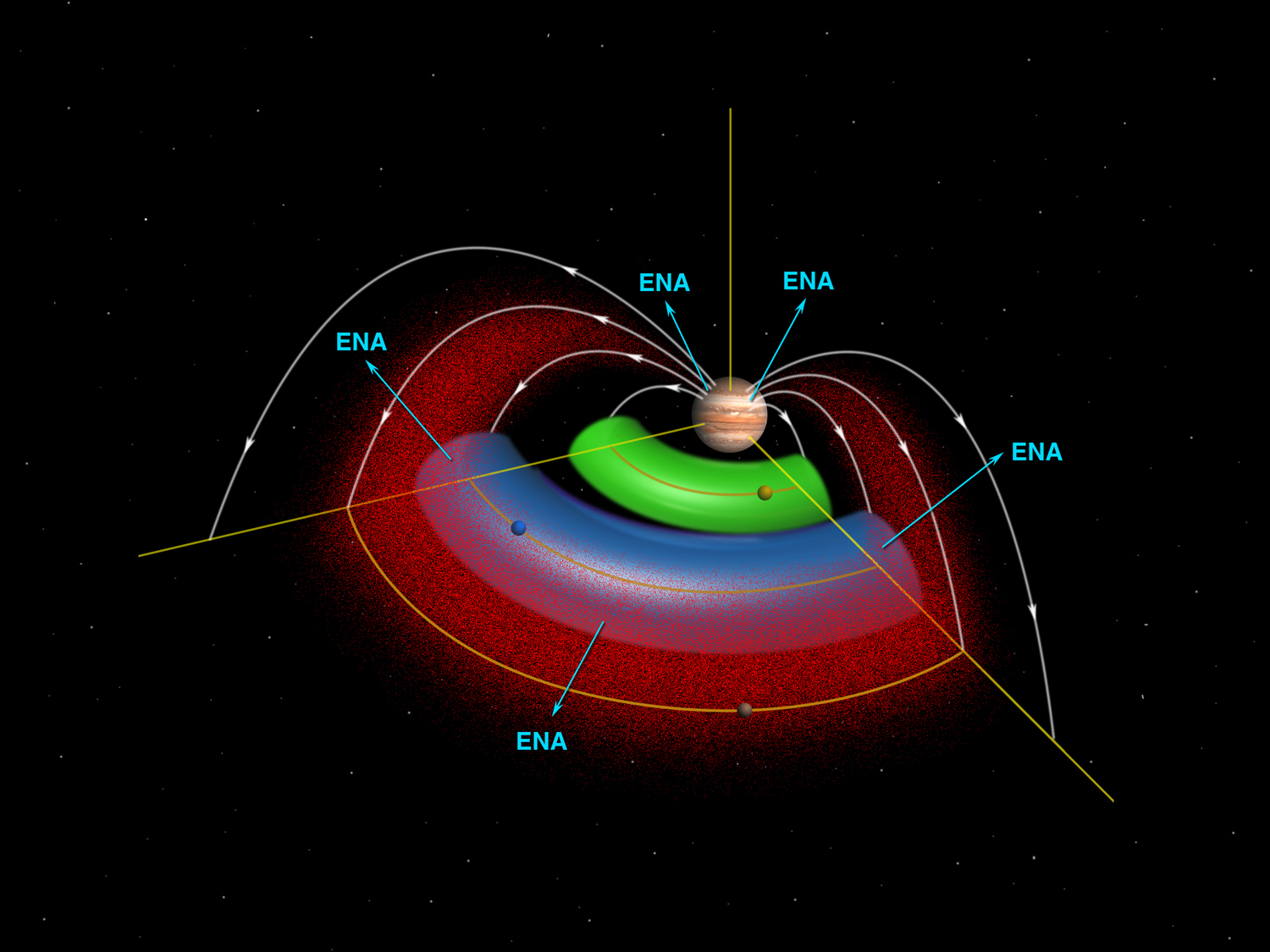
Jupiter's gas toruses generated by Io (green) and Europa (blue)

A gas torus is a toroidal cloud of gas or plasma that encircles a planet or moon. In the Solar System, gas tori tend to be produced by the interaction of a satellite's atmosphere with the magnetic field of a planet. The most famous example of this is the Io plasma torus, which is produced by the ionization of roughly 1 ton per second of oxygen and sulfur from the tenuous atmosphere of Jupiter's volcanic moon Io. Before being ionized, these particles are part of a neutral torus, also centered on the orbit of Io. Energetic particle observations also suggest the presence of a neutral torus around the orbit of Jupiter's moon Europa although such a torus would be merged with the outer portions of an Io torus.

Other examples include the largely neutral torus of oxygen and hydrogen produced by Saturn's moon Enceladus. The Enceladus and Io tori differ in that particles in the Io torus are predominantly ionized while in the Enceladus torus, the neutral density is much greater than the ion density.

After the Voyager encounters, the possibility of a torus of nitrogen produced by Saturn's moon Titan was proposed. Subsequent observations by the Cassini spacecraft showed no clear evidence of such a torus. While neutral nitrogen could not be measured, the ions near the orbit of Titan were primarily hydrogen or water group (O^{+}, OH^{+}, H_{2}O^{+} and H_{3}O^{+}) from the Enceladus torus. Trace amounts of nitrogen ions were detected but at levels consistent with an Enceladus source.
