= List of awards and nominations received by Stargate SG-1 =

Stargate SG-1
Awards and nominations
| Award | Wins | Nominations |
| CableACE Award | 0 | 1 |
| Constellation Award | 2 | 2 |
| Emmy Award | 0 | 9 |
| Gemini Award | 2 | 28 |
| Golden Reel Award | 0 | 2 |
| Hugo Award | 0 | 2 |
| Leo Award | 12 | 53 |
| Saturn Award | 6 | 30 |
| VES Award | 0 | 2 |

Totals (Note: Certain award groups do not simply award one winner. They acknowledge several different recipients, have runners-up, and have third place. Since this is a specific recognition and is different from losing an award, runner-up mentions are considered wins in this award tally. For simplification and to avoid errors, each award in this list has been presumed to have had a prior nomination.)
- Wins: 22
- Nominations: 129

Stargate SG-1 is an American-Canadian military science fiction television series and part of MGM's Stargate franchise. The show was created by Brad Wright and Jonathan Glassner, based on the 1994 feature film Stargate by Dean Devlin and Roland Emmerich. The first five seasons of the television series were broadcast by Showtime before the series moved to the Sci Fi Channel for its last five seasons. Stargate SG-1 premiered on Showtime on July 27, 1997; its final episode aired on Sky1 in the United Kingdom on March 13, 2007. Stargate SG-1 was nominated for and won numerous awards in its ten-season run.

== CableACE Awards ==
Stargate SG-1 was nominated for one CableACE Award.

| Year | Category | Nominee | Result |
|---|---|---|---|
| 1997 | Best Dramatic Series | Jonathan Glassner, Brad Wright, Michael Greenburg | Nominated |

== Constellation Awards ==
Stargate SG-1 won two Constellation Awards.

| Year | Category | Nominee | Episode | Result |
|---|---|---|---|---|
| 2006 | Best Female Performance in a 2006 Science Fiction Television Episode | Claudia Black | "Memento Mori" | Won |
| 2006 | Best Overall 2006 Science Fiction Film or Television Script | Brad Wright and Robert C. Cooper | "200" | Won |

== Emmy Award ==
Stargate SG-1 was nominated for eight Emmys in the "Outstanding Special Visual Effects for a Series" category and one Emmy for "Outstanding Music Composition for a Series (Dramatic Underscore)".

| Year | Category | Nominee | Episode | Result |
|---|---|---|---|---|
| 1998 | Outstanding Music Composition for a Series (Dramatic Underscore) | Joel Goldsmith | "The Nox" | Nominated |
| 1998 | Outstanding Special Visual Effects for a Series | David Alexander, Michelle Comens, John Gajdecki, Robert Habros, Peter Mastalyr, Ted Rae | "Children of the Gods" | Nominated |
| 2000 | Outstanding Special Visual Effects for a Series | James Tichenor, Michelle Comens, Kent Matheson, Craig Van Den Biggelaar, James G. Hebb, Jeremy Hoey, Bruce Woloshyn, Robin Hackl, Aruna Inversin | "Nemesis" | Nominated |
| 2001 | Outstanding Special Visual Effects for a Series | James Tichenor, Michelle Comens, Robin Hackl, Aruna Inversin, Debora Dunphy, Judy D. Shane, Kent Matheson, Allan Henderson, Craig Van Den Biggelaar, | "Small Victories" | Nominated |
| 2001 | Outstanding Special Visual Effects for a Series | James Tichenor, Shannon Gurney, Bruce Woloshyn, Robin Hackl, Doug Campbell, Debora Dunphy, Kent Matheson, Craig Van Den Biggelaar, Rod Bland | "Exodus" | Nominated |
| 2002 | Outstanding Special Visual Effects for a Series | James Tichenor, Michelle Comens, Shannon Gurney, Bruce Woloshyn, Tom Brydon, Doug Campbell, Kyle Yoneda, Greg Hansen, Brian Harder | "Enemies" | Nominated |
| 2002 | Outstanding Special Visual Effects for a Series | James Tichenor, Michelle Comens, Shannon Gurney, Robin Hackl, Adam de Bosch Kemper, Mark Breakspear, Kevin Little, Craig Van Den Biggelaar, Krista McLean | "Revelations" | Nominated |
| 2004 | Outstanding Special Visual Effects for a Series | Michelle Comens, James Tichenor, Shannon Gurney, Bruce Woloshyn, Chris Doll, James Halverson, Craig Van Den Biggelaar, Krista McLean, Patrick Kalyn | "Lost City" | Nominated |
| 2005 | Outstanding Special Visual Effects for a Series | Michelle Comens, James Rorick, Karen Watson, Krista McLean, Craig Van Den Biggelaar, Adam de Bosch Kemper, Brett Keyes, James Tichenor, Ryan Jensen | "Reckoning" | Nominated |

== Gemini Award ==
Stargate SG-1 won two Gemini Awards out of 28 nominations.

| Year | Category | Nominee | Episode | Result |
|---|---|---|---|---|
| 1998 | Best Visual Effects | Michelle Comens, John Gajdecki, Mark Savela, Simon Lacey | "Within the Serpent's Grasp" | Nominated |
| 1998 | Best Performance by an Actor in a Guest Role Dramatic Series | Jay Brazeau | "Tin Man" | Nominated |
| 1999 | Best Picture Editing in a Dramatic Program or Series | Daria Ellerman | "The Fifth Race" | Nominated |
| 1999 | Best Achievement in Make-Up | Monica Huppert, Adam Bhr, Jan Newman, Dave DuPuis | "Holiday" | Nominated |
| 2000 | Best Dramatic Series | Robert C. Cooper, N. John Smith, Jonathan Glassner, Michael Greenburg, Brad Wright, Richard Dean Anderson | — | Nominated |
| 2000 | Best Costume Design | Christina McQuarrie | "The Devil You Know" | Nominated |
| 2000 | Best Visual Effects | John Gajdecki, Simon Lacey, Wray Douglas, Kent Matheson | "Show and Tell" | Nominated |
| 2000 | Best Visual Effects | Wray Douglas, James Tichenor, Michelle Comens, Kent Matheson | "Into the Fire" | Nominated |
| 2000 | Best Production Design or Art Direction in a Dramatic Program or Series | Robert Davidson, Douglas McLean, Brentan Harron, Ivana Vasak, Bridget McGuire, Richard Hudolin, Mark Davidson | "The Devil You Know" | Won |
| 2000 | Best Achievement in Make-Up | Ryan Nicholson, Jan Newman, Christopher Pinhey, Fay von Schroeder, Holland Miller | "Jolinar's Memories" | Nominated |
| 2001 | Best Visual Effects | Craig Van Den Biggelaar, Christine Petrov, Greg Hansen, Debora Dunphy, Shannon Gurney, Judy D. Shane, Robin Hackl, Wray Douglas, Jeremy Hoey, Erik Ellefsen, James Tichenor, Kent Matheson | "Small Victories" | Nominated |
| 2001 | Best Visual Effects | James Tichenor, Michelle Comens, Craig Van Den Biggelaar, Robin Hackl, Shannon Gurney, Bruce Woloshyn, Stephen Bahr, Mark Roth | "Tangent" | Nominated |
| 2001 | Best Performance by an Actress in a Continuing Leading Dramatic Role | Amanda Tapping | "2010" | Nominated |
| 2001 | Best Production Design or Art Direction in a Dramatic Program or Series | Robert Davidson, Richard Hudolin, Mark Davidson, Bridget McGuire, Brentan Harron, Ivana Vasak, Doug McLean | "Beneath the Surface" | Nominated |
| 2002 | Best Visual Effects | Kyle Yoneda, Doug Campbell, Michelle Comens, James Tichenor, Craig Van Den Biggelaar, Shannon Gurney, Bruce Woloshyn, Tom Brydon, Brian Harder | "Enemies" | Nominated |
| 2002 | Best Achievement in Make-Up | Lise Kuhr, Todd Masters, Brad Proctor, Jan Newman, Christopher Pinhey, Holland Miller | "Beast of Burden" | Nominated |
| 2003 | Best Visual Effects | Robin Hackl, Adam de Bosch Kemper, James Tichenor, Krista McLean, Kevin Little, Craig Van Den Biggelaar, Shannon Gurney, Mark Breakspear | "Revelations" | Won |
| 2003 | Best Production Design or Art Direction in a Dramatic Program or Series | Doug McLean, Bridget McGuire, Brentan Harron, Ivana Vasak, Richard Hudolin, Mark Davidson, Robert Davidson | "Summit" | Nominated |
| 2003 | Best Sound in a Dramatic Series | Iain Pattison, Devan Kraushar, Sina Oroomchi, Kirby Jinnah, Dave Hibbert, David Cyr | "The Warrior" | Nominated |
| 2004 | Best Photography in a Dramatic Program or Series | Peter Woeste | "Nightwalkers" | Nominated |
| 2004 | Best Visual Effects | Michelle Comens, James Tichenor, Craig Van Den Biggelaar, Krista McLean, Adam de Bosch Kemper, Bruce Woloshyn, Shannon Gurney, Simon Ager, Mathew Talbot-Kelly, Debora Dunphy | "Redemption (Part 2)" | Nominated |
| 2004 | Best Visual Effects | Matt Martell, Michelle Comens, Tom Brydon, Nicholas Boughen, Bruce Woloshyn, James Tichenor, Simon Ager, Wes Sargent, Marc Roth | "Descent" | Nominated |
| 2005 | Best Visual Effects | James Halverson, Craig Van Den Biggelaar, Bruce Woloshyn, James Tichenor, Krista McLean, Chris Doll, Shannon Gurney, Karen Watson | "Lost City (Part 2)" | Nominated |
| 2005 | Best Visual Effects | Bruce Mullennix, Krista McLean, Michelle Comens, Karen Watson, James Halverson, James Rorick, Craig Van Den Biggelaar, Brett Keyes | "New Order (Part 1)" | Nominated |
| 2006 | Best Visual Effects | James Rorick, Mark Savela, Vinay Mehta, Kyle Winkleman, Craig Van Den Biggelaar, Brendon Morfitt, Karen Watson, Anuj Patil | "Beachhead" | Nominated |
| 2006 | Best Visual Effects | James Kawano, Krista McLean, Jeremy Hampton, Erica Henderson, Christopher Stewart, Michelle Comens, Robin Hackl, Stephen Bahr | "Camelot" | Nominated |
| 2006 | Best Achievement in Make-Up | Todd Masters, Jan Newman | "Origin" | Nominated |
| 2006 | Best Sound in a Dramatic Series | Dave Hibbert, Wayne Finucan, Gord Hillier, Devan Kraushar, Kirby Jinnah | "Camelot" | Nominated |

== Golden Reel Awards ==
Stargate SG-1 was nominated for 2 Golden Reel Awards by the Motion Picture Sound Editors.

| Year | Category | Episode | Result |
|---|---|---|---|
| 1998 | Best Sound editing - Television Episodic | — | Nominated |
| 1998 | Best Sound Editing - Television Movies of the week | "Children of the Gods" | Nominated |

== Hugo Awards ==
Stargate SG-1 was nominated for 2 Hugo awards.

| Year | Category | Episode | Result |
|---|---|---|---|
| 2004 | Best Dramatic Presentation - Short Form | "Heroes" | Nominated |
| 2007 | Best Dramatic Presentation - Short Form | "200" | Nominated |

== Leo Awards ==
Stargate SG-1 won twelve Leo Awards out of 53 nominations.

| Year | Category | Nominee | Episode | Result |
|---|---|---|---|---|
| 2000 | Best Overall Sound in a Dramatic Series | Adam Boyd, Adam Gejdos, Eric Hillman, Iain Pattison, Kelly Frey, Kirby Jinnah, Paul A. Sharpe | "Nemesis" | Won |
| 2000 | Best Cinematography in a Dramatic Series | James Alfred Menard | "Into the Fire" | Nominated |
| 2000 | Best Performance by a Female in a Dramatic Series | Amanda Tapping | "Point of View" | Nominated |
| 2000 | Best Performance by a Male in a Dramatic Series | Michael Shanks | "Forever in a Day" | Nominated |
| 2000 | Best Production Design in a Dramatic Series | Richard Hudolin | "The Devil You Know" | Nominated |
| 2000 | Best Screenwriter of a Dramatic Series | Brad Wright, Victoria James | "A Hundred Days" | Nominated |
| 2001 | Best Production Design of Dramatic Series | Richard Hudolin, Bridget McGuire, Brentan Harron, Doug McLean, Ivana Vasak, Mark Davidson, Robert Davidson | "The Light" | Won |
| 2001 | Best Visual Effects of Dramatic Series | Michelle Comens, Shannon Gurney, Kent Matheson, Judy D. Shane, Erik Ellefsen, Jason Macza, Rosano Lepri, Bruce Woloshyn | "The Curse" | Nominated |
| 2001 | Best Visual Effects of Dramatic Series | James Tichenor, Jean-Luc Dinsdale, Robin Hackl, Craig Van Den Biggelaar, Debora Dunphy, Kent Matheson, Judy D. Shane, Erik Ellefsen, Jason Macza, Christine Petrov, Jeremy Hoey | "Small Victories" | Nominated |
| 2002 | Best Production Design of a Dramatic Series | Richard Hudolin, Bridget McGuire, Brentan Harron, Ivana Vasak, Doug McLean, Mark Davidson, Robert Davidson | "The Tomb" | Won |
| 2002 | Dramatic Series: Best Lead Performance - Female | Amanda Tapping | "Ascension" | Won |
| 2002 | Best Cinematography | Peter Woeste | "The Tomb" | Nominated |
| 2002 | Dramatic Series: Best Director | Andy Mikita | "Proving Ground" | Nominated |
| 2002 | Dramatic Series: Best Visual Effects | James Tichenor, Michelle Comens, Shannon Gurney, Krista McLean, Neil McBean, Brian Harder, Adam de Bosch Kemper, Derek Stevenson, Greg Hansen, Bruce Woloshyn | "Revelations" | Nominated |
| 2002 | Best Program | N. John Smith, Brad Wright, Robert C. Cooper, Richard Dean Anderson, Michael Greenburg | — | Nominated |
| 2003 | Best Costume in a Dramatic Series | Christina McQuarrie, Lid Hawkins | "Full Circle" | Won |
| 2003 | Dramatic Series: Best Make-Up | Jan Newman, Rachel Griffin, David Dupuis, Todd Masters | "Metamorphosis" | Won |
| 2003 | Dramatic Series: Best Director | Andy Mikita | "Unnatural Selection" | Nominated |
| 2003 | Dramatic Series: Best Overall Sound | David M. Cyr, Sina Oroomchi, Iain Pattison, Dave Hibbert | "The Warrior" | Nominated |
| 2003 | Best Sound Editing | Devan Kraushar, Cam Wagner, Kelly Frey, James Wallace, Kirby Jinnah | "The Warrior" | Nominated |
| 2003 | Dramatic Series: Best Visual Effects | James Tichenor, Shannon Gurney, Krista McLean, Karen Watson, Craig Van Den Biggelaar, Tom Brydon, Bruce Woloshyn | "Unnatural Selection" | Nominated |
| 2003 | Best Screenwriting | Damian Kindler | "Cure" | Nominated |
| 2003 | Best Screenwriting | Robert C. Cooper | "Paradise Lost" | Nominated |
| 2003 | Best Production Design | Bridget McGuire, Peter Bodnarus, Robert Davidson, Mark Davidson, Jim Ramsay, Ricardo Spinace, James Robbins | "Full Circle" | Nominated |
| 2003 | Best Supporting Performance - Male | Tom McBeath | "Paradise Lost" | Nominated |
| 2003 | Best Program | N. John Smith, Peter DeLuise, Damian Kindler, Andy Mikita, Paul Mullie, Joseph Mallozzi, Richard Dean Anderson, Michael Greenburg, Robert C. Cooper, Brad Wright | — | Nominated |
| 2004 | Best Sound Editing in a Dramatic Series | Devan Kraushar, James Wallace, Kirby Jinnah, Kelly Frey, Jason Mauza | "Lost City (Part 2)" | Won |
| 2004 | Dramatic Series: Best Lead Performance by a Female | Amanda Tapping | "Grace" | Won |
| 2004 | Dramatic Series: Best Lead Performance by a Male | Michael Shanks | "Lifeboat" | Won |
| 2004 | Dramatic Series: Best Make-Up | Jan Newman, Todd Masters, Lise Kuhr, Rachel Griffin, Dorothee Deichmann, Mike Fields | "Enemy Mine" | Won |
| 2004 | Dramatic Series: Best Direction | Andy Mikita | "Heroes (Part 2)" | Nominated |
| 2004 | Dramatic Series: Best Direction | Amanda Tapping | "Resurrection" | Nominated |
| 2004 | Dramatic Series: Best Supporting Performance by a Female | Teryl Rothery | "Lifeboat" | Nominated |
| 2004 | Dramatic Series: Best Supporting Performance by a Male | Don S. Davis | "Heroes (Part 2)" | Nominated |
| 2004 | Best Screenwriting | Robert C. Cooper | "Heroes (Part 2)" | Nominated |
| 2004 | Best Picture Editing | Eric Hill | "Heroes (Part 2)" | Nominated |
| 2004 | Best Overall Sound | Sina Oroomchi, David Hibbert, Devan Kraushar, David Cur | "Grace" | Nominated |
| 2004 | Best Overall Sound | Sina Oroomchi, David Hibbert, Devan Kraushar, Wayne Finucan | "Lost City (Part 2)" | Nominated |
| 2004 | Best Visual Effects | James Tichenor, Craig Vandenbiggelaar, Patrick Kalyn, James Halverson, Chris Doll | "Lost City (Part 2)" | Nominated |
| 2004 | Best Production Design | Bridget McGuire, Peter Bodnarus, James Robbins, Robert Davidson, Mark Davidson | "Lost City (Part 2)" | Nominated |
| 2004 | Best Make-Up | Jan Newman, Todd Masters, Lise Kuhr, Rachel Griffin, Dorothee Deichmann, Mike Fields | "Enemy Mine" | Nominated |
| 2004 | Best Costume Design | Christina McQuarrie, Lid Hawkins | "Birthright" | Nominated |
| 2004 | Best Dramatic Series | N. John Smith, Brad Wright, Robert C. Cooper, Michael Greenburg, Richard Dean Anderson, Joseph Mallozzi, Paul Mullie, Andy Mikita, Damian Kindler, Peter DeLuise | — | Nominated |
| 2005 | Dramatic Series: Best Lead Performance by a Female | Amanda Tapping | "Threads" | Won |
| 2005 | Dramatic Series: Best Costume Design | Christine Mooney | "Moebius (Part 2)" | Won |
| 2005 | Dramatic Series: Best Costume Design | Christine Mooney | "It's Good to Be King" | Nominated |
| 2005 | Dramatic Series: Best Cinematography | James Alfred Menard | "It's Good to Be King" | Nominated |
| 2005 | Dramatic Series: Best Lead Performance by a Male | Michael Shanks | "Threads" | Nominated |
| 2005 | Dramatic Series: Best Screenwriting | Peter DeLuise | "Affinity" | Nominated |
| 2005 | Dramatic Series: Best Supporting Performance by a Male | Tom McBeath | "It's Good to Be King" | Nominated |
| 2005 | Dramatic Series: Best Visual Effects | Michelle Comens, James Rorick, Krista McLean, Brett Keyes, Brian Harder | "Reckoning (Part 2)" | Nominated |
| 2006 | Best Cinematography in a Dramatic Series | James Alfred Menard | "Avalon (Part 2)" | Nominated |
| 2007 | Best Supporting Performance by a Male in a Dramatic Series | Matthew Walker | "The Quest (Part 2)" | Nominated |

== Saturn Awards ==
Stargate SG-1 won six Saturn Awards out of thirty nominations:

| Year | Category | Nominee | Result |
|---|---|---|---|
| 1997 | Best Genre TV Actor | Richard Dean Anderson | Nominated |
| 1997 | Best Syndicated Television Series | — | Won |
| 1998 | Best Actor on Television | Richard Dean Anderson | Won |
| 1998 | Best Syndicated Television Series | — | Nominated |
| 1999 | Best Genre TV Actor | Richard Dean Anderson | Nominated |
| 1999 | Best Supporting Actress on Television | Amanda Tapping | Nominated |
| 1999 | Best Syndicated Television Series | — | Won |
| 2000 | Best Genre TV Actor | Richard Dean Anderson | Nominated |
| 2000 | Best Supporting Actress on Television | Amanda Tapping | Nominated |
| 2000 | Best Supporting Actor on Television | Michael Shanks | Nominated |
| 2000 | Best Syndicated Television Series | — | Nominated |
| 2001 | Best Actor on Television | Richard Dean Anderson | Nominated |
| 2001 | Best Supporting Actress on Television | Amanda Tapping | Nominated |
| 2001 | Best Supporting Actor on Television | Christopher Judge | Nominated |
| 2001 | Best Syndicated Television Series | — | Nominated |
| 2002 | Best Actor on Television | Richard Dean Anderson | Nominated |
| 2002 | Best Syndicated/Cable Television Series | — | Nominated |
| 2003 | Best Actor on Television | Richard Dean Anderson | Nominated |
| 2003 | Best Actor on Television | Michael Shanks | Nominated |
| 2003 | Best Supporting Actress on Television | Amanda Tapping | Nominated |
| 2003 | Best Syndicated/Cable Television Series | — | Won |
| 2004 | Best Actor on Television | Richard Dean Anderson | Nominated |
| 2004 | Best Supporting Actor on Television | Michael Shanks | Nominated |
| 2004 | Best Supporting Actress on Television | Amanda Tapping | Won |
| 2004 | Best Syndicated/Cable Television Series | — | Won |
| 2005 | Best Actor on Television | Ben Browder | Nominated |
| 2005 | Best Supporting Actress on Television | Claudia Black | Nominated |
| 2005 | Best Syndicated/Cable Television Series | — | Nominated |
| 2006 | Best Syndicated/Cable Television Series | — | Nominated |
| 2007 | Best Syndicated/Cable Television Series | — | Nominated |

== SFX Awards ==
Stargate SG-1 was nominated for three SFX Awards.

| Year | Category | Nominee | Episode | Result |
|---|---|---|---|---|
| 2004 | Best TV Show | — | — | Nominated |
| 2007 | Best TV Actress | Claudia Black | — | Nominated |
| 2007 | Best TV Episode | Martin Wood (director) | "200" | Nominated |

== Visual Effects Society Awards ==
Stargate SG-1 was nominated for two VES Awards.

| Year | Category | Nominee | Episode | Result |
|---|---|---|---|---|
| 2003 | Best Character Animation in a Live Action Televised Program, Music Video, or Commercial | James Tichenor, Craig Van Den Biggelaar, Kevin Little, Adam de Bosch Kemper | "Revelations" | Nominated |
| 2005 | Outstanding Visual Effects in a Broadcast Series | James Tichenor, Shannon Gurney, Craig Van Den Biggelaar, Bruce Woloshyn | "Lost City (Part 2)" | Nominated |

== See also ==
- List of Stargate Atlantis awards and nominations
- List of Stargate Universe awards and nominations
