= List of awards and nominations received by Stargate Atlantis =

Stargate Atlantis awards and nominations
Awards and nominations
Award	Wins	Nominations
Canadian Screenwriting Awards	1	2
Chicago International Film Festival	1	1
Constellation Awards	0	2
DGC Craft Award	0	1
Emmy Awards	0	4
Gemini Awards	4	16
Leo Awards	10	27
Nebula Awards	0	1
New York Film Festival	1	1
People's Choice Awards	1	1
Saturn Awards	0	3
Visual Effects Society	0	2
WorldFest-Houston	1	1

Totals (Note: Certain award groups do not simply award one winner. They acknowledge several different recipients, have runners-up, and have third place. Since this is a specific recognition and is different from losing an award, runner-up mentions are considered wins in this award tally. For simplification and to avoid errors, each award in this list has been presumed to have had a prior nomination.)
- Wins: 19
- Nominations: 62

Stargate Atlantis is an American-Canadian military science fiction television series and part of MGM's Stargate franchise. The series was created by Robert C. Cooper and Brad Wright as a spin-off series to Stargate SG-1. The series aired for five seasons and 100 episodes on the US Sci Fi Channel. Stargate Atlantis premiered on SCI FI on July 16, 2004; its final episode aired on January 9, 2009.

Since 2005, Stargate Atlantis was nominated for various awards during its five-year run. Among them, the series has been nominated for four Emmy Awards, eleven Gemini Awards (two were won), 27 Leo Awards (ten were won), one Nebula Award, one People's Choice Award which was won, and two Visual Effects Society Awards. Out of the total 62 nominations, Stargate Atlantis won 19 awards.

== Canadian Screenwriting Awards ==
Stargate Atlantis was nominated for two Canadian Screenwriting Awards.

Year	Category	Nominee	Episode	Result
2007	WGC Showrunner Award	Brad Wright	—	Won
2006	Drama Series (One Hour)	Martin Gero	Duet	Nominated

== Chicago International Film Festival ==
Stargate Atlantis was nominated for one Silver Plaque in the Chicago International Film Festival, 2005.

Year	Category	Nominee	Episode	Result
2005	Outstanding Achievement in a Television Drama Direction	David Winning	"Childhood's End"	Won

== Constellation Awards ==
The series was nominated for two Constellation Awards.

Year	Category	Nominee	Episode	Result
2009	Best Male Performance in a 2008 Science Fiction Television Episode	David Hewlett	"The Shrine"	Nominated
2009	Best Science Fiction Television Series of 2008	—	—	Nominated

== DGC Craft Awards ==
Stargate Atlantis was nominated for one DGC Craft Award by the Directors Guild of Canada.

Year	Category	Nominee	Episode	Result
2008	Direction - Television Series	Martin Wood	Trio	Nominated

== Emmy Awards ==
Stargate Atlantis was nominated for four Emmy Awards. From those, they were nominations for "Outstanding Special Visual Effects for a Series" twice, and one each for "Outsdanding Main Title Theme Music" and "Outstanding Music Composition for a Series (Dramatical Underscore)".

Year	Category	Nominee	Episode	Result
2005	Outstanding Main Title Theme Music	Joel Goldsmith	—	Nominated
2005	Outstanding Special Visual Effects for a Series	Michelle Comens, John Gajdecki, Bruce Woloshyn, Jinnie Pak, Dan Mayer, Wes Sargent, Jose Burgos, Debora Dunphy, Chris Doll	"Rising"	Nominated
2006	Outstanding Music Composition for a Series (Dramatic Underscore)	Joel Goldsmith	"Grace Under Pressure"	Nominated
2008	Outstanding Special Visual Effects for a Series	Mark Savela, Shannon Gurney, Erica Henderson, Jason Gross, Jamie Yukio Kawano, Michael Lowes, Giles Hancock, Jeremy Kehler, Daniel Osaki	"Adrift"	Nominated

== Gemini Awards ==
Stargate Atlantis was nominated for sixteen Gemini Awards. They were nominated for four awards in 2005, one in 2006, two in 2007, four in 2008, and five in 2009. In total, they won four awards.

Year	Category	Nominee	Episode	Result
2005	Best Visual Effects	Michelle Comens, John Gajdecki, Bruce Woloshyn, Jinnie Pak, Tom Brydon, José Burgos, Dan Mayer, Wes Sargent	"Rising"	Won
2005	Best Visual Effects	Michelle Comens, John Gajdecki, Bruce Woloshyn, Jinnie Pak, Tom Brydon, José Burgos, Dan Mayer, Wes Sargent	"The Eye"	Nominated
2005	Best Writing in a Dramatic Series	Martin Gero	"The Brotherhood"	Nominated
2005	Best Achievement in Make-Up	Leah Ehman, Todd Masters	"Before I Sleep"	Nominated
2006	Best Sound in a Dramatic Series	Steve Smith, Dave Hibbert, Gord Hillier, Kirby Jinnah, Kevin Sands	"The Hive"	Nominated
2007	Best Visual Effects	Mark Savela, Tom Brydon, Brenda Campbell, Debora Dunphy, Shannon Gurney, Andrew Karr, Todd Liddiard, Alec McClymont	"No Man's Land"	Won
2007	Best Writing in a Dramatic Series	Martin Gero	"McKay and Mrs. Miller"	Nominated
2008	Best Performance by an Actress in a Continuing Leading Dramatic Role	Jewel Staite	"Missing"	Nominated
2008	Best Writing in a Dramatic Series	Alan McCullough	"Tabula Rasa"	Nominated
2008	Best Visual Effects	Mark Savela, Marco Checa Garcia, Sebastian Greece, Shannon Gurney, Paul Hegg, Brandon Hines, Aaron Kramer, Nikolas Slotiuk, Toby Taplin, Ray Van Steenwyk	"Be All My Sins Remember'd"	Nominated
2008	Best Achievement in Make-Up	Todd Masters	"The Last Man"	Nominated
2009	Best Achievement in Make-Up	Todd Masters, Leah Ehman, Holland Miller, Brad Proctor, Kyla Rose Tremblay	"Vegas"	Won
2009	Best Costume Design	Valerie Halverson	"The Queen"	Nominated
2009	Best Visual Effects	Mark Savela, Jason Gross, Paul Hegg, Brandon Hines, Jamie Yukio Kawano, Alex McClymont, Krista McLean, James Rorick, Luke Vallee	"Enemy at the Gate"	Nominated
2009	Best Visual Effects	Mark Savela, Brenda Campbell, Natalia Diaz, Carina Dielissen Hunt, Shannon Gurney, Paul Hegg, Vivian Jim, Chandra Juhasz, Kodie MacKenzie, Alex McClymont	"First Contact"	Nominated
2009	Best Writing in a Dramatic Series	Brad Wright	"The Shrine"	Won

== Leo Awards ==
Stargate Atlantis was nominated for a total of 27 Leo Awards, ten of which were for 2005, while the other 17 were for 2009.

Year	Category	Nominee	Episode	Result
2005	Best Visual Effects in a Dramatic Series	Mark Breakspear, Bruce Woloshyn, Dan Mayer, Simon Ager, Tara Conley	"The Eye"	Won
2005	Best Dramatic Series	Brad Wright, Robert C. Cooper, N. John Smith, Michael Greenburg, Martin Wood, Joseph Mallozzi, Paul Mullie	—	Nominated
2005	Best Picture Editing in a Dramatic Series	Jeremy Presner	"The Eye"	Nominated
2005	Best Overall Sound in a Dramatic Series	Gord Hillier, Dave Hibbert, Kevin Sands	"The Storm"	Nominated
2005	Best Production Design in a Dramatic Series	Bridget McGuire, Thom Wells, James Robbins, Peter Bodnarus, Mark Davidson, Robert Davidson	"Rising, Part 1"	Nominated
2005	Best Direction in a Dramatic Series	Peter DeLuise	"The Defiant One"	Nominated
2005	Best Screenwriting in a Dramatic Series	Peter DeLuise	"The Defiant One"	Nominated
2005	Best Supporting Performance by a Male	Paul McGillion	"Poisoning the Well"	Nominated
2005	Best Supporting Performance by a Male	David Nykl	"Poisoning the Well"	Nominated
2005	Best Supporting Performance by a Female	Allison Hossack	"Poisoning the Well"	Nominated
2009	Best Dramatic Series	Joseph Mallozzi, Paul Mullie, Brad Wright, Robert Cooper, Carl Binder, Martin Gero, Alan McCullough, John Smith	—	Won
2009	Best Direction in a Dramatic Series	Robert C. Cooper	"Vegas"	Won
2009	Best Screenwriting in a Dramatic Series	Brad Wright	"The Shrine"	Nominated
2009	Best Screenwriting in a Dramatic Series	Joseph Mallozzi, Paul Mullie	"Remnants"	Nominated
2009	Best Screenwriting in a Dramatic Series	Alan McCullough	"The Queen"	Won
2009	Best Cinematography in a Dramatic Series	Michael Blundell	"Vegas"	Won
2009	Best Cinematography in a Dramatic Series	Jim Menard	"The Shrine"	Nominated
2009	Best Picture Editing in a Dramatic Series	Mike Banas	"Vegas"	Won
2009	Best Picture Editing in a Dramatic Series	Brad Rines	"The Shrine"	Nominated
2009	Best Overall Sound in a Dramatic Series	Kelly Cole, Bill Mellow, Joe Watts, Hugo De Le Cerda, Kevin Belen	"Enemy at the Gate"	Won
2009	Best Sound Editing in a Dramatic Series	Steve Smith, Matthew Wilson, Kirby Jinnah, Jay Cheetham	"Enemy at the Gate"	Won
2009	Best Production Design in a Dramatic Series	James Robbins	"Search and Rescue"	Nominated
2009	Best Costume Design in a Dramatic Series	Valarie Halverson	"The Queen"	Won
2009	Best Make-Up in a Dramatic Series	Todd Masters, Holland Miller, Kyla-Rose Tremblay, Nicholas Podbrey, Brad Proctor	"Vegas"	Nominated
2009	Best Visual Effects in a Dramatic Series	Mark Savela, Shannon Gurney, Kodie MacKenzie, Vivian Jim, Dan Wier	"First Contact"	Won
2009	Best Lead Performance by a Male in a Dramatic Series	David Hewlett	"The Shrine"	Nominated
2009	Best Lead Performance by a Female in a Dramatic Series	Jewel Staite	"Tracker"	Nominated

== Nebula Awards ==
The series was nominated for a Nebula Award in 2009.

Year	Category	Nominee	Episode	Result
2009	Nebula Award for Best Script	Brad Wright	"The Shrine"	Nominated

== New York Film Festival ==
Stargate Atlantis won a Bronze Worldmedal in the New York Film Festival in 2005.

Year	Category	Nominee	Episode	Result
2005	Outstanding Achievement in a Television Drama	David Winning	"Childhood's End"	Won

== People's Choice Awards ==
In 2008, Stargate Atlantis was nominated for "Best Sci-Fi Show" for the 34th People's Choice Awards, where it was up against Battlestar Galactica and Doctor Who.

Year	Category	Nominee	Episode	Result
2008	Best Sci-Fi Show	Stargate Atlantis	—	Won

== Saturn Awards ==
The series was nominated for two Saturn Awards in 2005, and for one in 2006.

Year	Category	Nominee	Episode	Result
2005	Best Syndicated/Cable Television Series	Stargate Atlantis	—	Nominated
2005	Best Supporting Actress in a Television Series	Torri Higginson	—	Nominated
2006	Best Syndicated/Cable Television Series	Stargate Atlantis	—	Nominated

== Visual Effects Society Awards ==
Two episodes were nominated for Visual Effects Society Awards. One was nominated in 2005, while the other was nominated in 2008. Both were nominated for "Outstanding Visual Effects in a Broadcast Series".

Year	Category	Nominee	Episode	Result
2005	Outstanding Visual Effects in a Broadcast Series	John Gajdecki, Bruce Woloshyn, Jinnie Pak, Tara Conley	"Rising"	Nominated
2008	Outstanding Visual Effect in a Broadcast Series	Mark Savela, Shannon Gurney, Erica Henderson, Jamie Yukio Kawano	"Adrift"	Nominated

== WorldFest-Houston International Film Festival ==
Stargate Atlantis was nominated for a First Place Platinum in the 2005 WorldFest-Houston International Film Festival.

Year	Category	Nominee	Episode	Result
2005	Outstanding Achievement in a Television Drama Direction	David Winning	"Childhood's End"	Won

== See also ==
- List of Stargate SG-1 awards and nominations
- List of Stargate Universe awards and nominations
