= List of awards and nominations received by Stargate Universe =

Stargate Universe awards and nominations
Awards and nominations
| Award | Wins | Nominations |
| Canadian Screenwriting Awards | 1 | 1 |
| Constellation Award | 6 | 14 |
| Emmy Awards | 0 | 3 |
| Gemini Awards | 1 | 9 |
| Leo Award | 6 | 17 |
| VES Award | 0 | 2 |

Totals (Note: Certain award groups do not simply award one winner. They acknowledge several different recipients, have runners-up, and have third place. Since this is a specific recognition and is different from losing an award, runner-up mentions are considered wins in this award tally. For simplification and to avoid errors, each award in this list has been presumed to have had a prior nomination.)
- Wins: 14
- Nominations: 46

Stargate Universe is a Canadian-American military science fiction television series and part of MGM's Stargate franchise. The series, created by Brad Wright and Robert C. Cooper, premiered with the first two parts of a three-part episode, "Air" on Syfy on October 2, 2009.

== Canadian Screenwriting Awards ==
In 2010 Stargate Universe and Robert C. Cooper won the Canadian Screenwriting Award for the "Episodic one hour".

| Year | Category | Nominee | Episode | Result |
|---|---|---|---|---|
| 2010 | WGC Episodic one hour | Robert C. Cooper | "Time" | Won |

== Constellation Awards ==
Stargate Universe has been nominated for fourteen Constellation Awards, and has won six, as of 2012.

| Year | Category | Nominee | Episode | Result |
|---|---|---|---|---|
| 2010 | Best Science Fiction Television Series of 2009 | Stargate Universe | — | Nominated |
| 2010 | Best Overall 2009 Science Fiction Film or Television Script | Robert C. Cooper | "Time" | Nominated |
| 2011 | Best Science Fiction Television Series of 2010 | Stargate Universe | — | Won |
| 2011 | Best Male Performance in a 2010 Science Fiction Television Episode | Robert Carlyle | "Human" | Nominated |
| 2011 | Best Technical Accomplishment in a 2010 Science Fiction Film or Television Production | Andy Mikita | "Incursion (Part 2)" | Nominated |
| 2011 | Outstanding Canadian Contribution to Science Fiction Film or Television in 2010 | Joseph Mallozzi | —" | Nominated |
| 2012 | Best Male Performance in a 2011 Science Fiction Television Episode | Robert Carlyle | "Twin Destinies" | Nominated |
| 2012 | Best Male Performance in a 2011 Science Fiction Television Episode | David Blue | "Gauntlet" | Nominated |
| 2012 | Best Female Performance in a 2011 Science Fiction Television Episode | Ming-Na | "Epilogue" | Won |
| 2012 | Best Female Performance in a 2011 Science Fiction Television Episode | Alaina Huffman | "Epilogue" | Nominated |
| 2012 | Best Science Fiction Television Series of 2011 | Stargate Universe | — | Won |
| 2012 | Best Technical Accomplishment in a 2011 Science Fiction Film or Television Production | Joel Goldsmith, Music - "Stargate Universe" | — | Won |
| 2012 | Best Overall 2011 Science Fiction Film or Television Script | Stargate Universe | "Twin Destinies" | Won |
| 2012 | Outstanding Canadian Contribution to Science Fiction Film or Television in 2011 | Stargate Universe | — | Won |

== Emmy Awards ==
Stargate Universe has been nominated for three Emmy Award nominations for "Outstanding Special Visual Effects for a Series", but lost to CSI: Crime Scene Investigation and Boardwalk Empire, respectively., with the 2011 award winners to be announced on September 18, 2011.

| Year | Category | Nominee | Episode | Result |
|---|---|---|---|---|
| 2010 | Outstanding Special Visual Effects for a Series | Mark Savela, Michael Lowes, Vivian Jim, Kodie MacKenzie, Andrew Karr, Alec McClymont, Brenda Campbell, Craig VandenBiggelaa | "Air" | Nominated |
| 2010 | Outstanding Special Visual Effects for a Series | Mark Savela, Jamie Yukio Kawano, Krista McLean, Luke Vallee, Jason Gross, Steve Garrad, Chris Deroiche, Robert Bourgeault | "Space" | Nominated |
| 2011 | Outstanding Special Visual Effects for a Series | Mark Savela, Krista McLean, Craig VandenBiggelaar, Adam de Bosch Kemper, Erica Henderson, Michael Lowes, Wes Sargent, Luke Vallee, Kodie MacKenzie | "Awakening" | Nominated |

== Gemini Awards ==
Stargate Universe has been nominated for nine Gemini Awards in 2010. The results will be announced on November 13, 2010 at the Gemini Awards Ceremony.

| Year | Category | Nominee | Episode | Result |
|---|---|---|---|---|
| 2010 | Best Dramatic Series | – | – | Nominated |
| 2010 | Best Performance by an Actor in a Continuing Leading Dramatic Role | Robert Carlyle | "Human" | Won |
| 2010 | Best Performance by an Actor in a Continuing Leading Dramatic Role | Louis Ferreira | "Justice" | Nominated |
| 2010 | Best Direction in a Dramatic Series | Andy Mikita | "Air, Part 1" | Nominated |
| 2010 | Best Photography in a Dramatic Program or Series | Jim Menard | "Light" | Nominated |
| 2010 | Best Picture Editing in a Dramatic Program or Series | Rick Martin | "Human" | Nominated |
| 2010 | Best Sound in a Dramatic Series | Kelly Cole, Jay Cheetham, Kirby Jinnah, Bill Mellow, Patrick Ramsay, Steve Smith, Joe Watts, Matt Wilson | "Air, Part 1″ | Nominated |
| 2010 | Best Visual Effects | Mark Savela, Brenda Campbell, Shannon Gurney, Vivian Jim, Andrew Karr, Michael Lowes, Kodie MacKenzie, Krista McLean, Alec MClymont, Craig Vandenbiggelaar | "Air, Part 1″ | Nominated |
| 2010 | Best Original Music Score for a Program or Series | Joel Goldsmith | "Light" | Nominated |

== Leo Awards ==
Stargate Universe has been nominated for 17 Leo Awards.

| Year | Category | Nominee | Episode | Result |
|---|---|---|---|---|
| 2010 | Best Dramatic Series | Stargate Universe | — | Won |
| 2010 | Best Direction in a Dramatic Series | Robert C. Cooper | "Human" | Nominated |
| 2010 | Best Direction in a Dramatic Series | Peter DeLuise | "Light" | Nominated |
| 2010 | Best Screenwriting in a Dramatic Series | Brad Wright | "Light" | Won |
| 2010 | Best Cinematography in a Dramatic Series | Jim Menard | "Light" | Nominated |
| 2010 | Best Cinematography in a Dramatic Series | Michael Blundell | "Human" | Won |
| 2010 | Best Picture Editing for a Dramatic Series | Brad Rines | "Pain" | Nominated |
| 2010 | Best Picture Editing for a Dramatic Series | Mike Banas | "Air" | Nominated |
| 2010 | Best Picture Editing for a Dramatic Series | Rick Martin | "Human" | Won |
| 2010 | Best Production Design in a Dramatic Series | James C. D. Robbins | "Air" | Nominated |
| 2010 | Best Visual Effects in a Dramatic Series | Mark Savela, Jason Gross, Steve Garrad, James Kawano, Viv Jim | "Space" | Nominated |
| 2010 | Best Visual Effects in a Dramatic Series | Mark Savela, Shannon Gurney, Brenda Campbell, Craig Vandenbiggelaar, Krista McLean | "Air" | Won |
| 2010 | Best Stunt Coordination in a Dramatic Series | James Bamford | "Air" | Nominated |
| 2010 | Best Supporting Performance by a Male in a Dramatic Series | Patrick Gilmore | "Pain" | Nominated |
| 2010 | Best Supporting Performance by a Female in a Dramatic Series | Jennifer Spence | "Life" | Nominated |
| 2010 | Best Supporting Performance by a Female in a Dramatic Series | Julia Benson | "Pain" | Won |
| 2011 | Best Supporting Performance by a Female in a Dramatic Series | Jennifer Spence | "Malice" | Nominated |

== Visual Effects Society Awards ==
In 2010 Stargate Universe has been nominated for one VES Award.

| Year | Category | Nominee | Episode | Result |
|---|---|---|---|---|
| 2010 | Outstanding Visual Effects in a Broadcast Series | Shannon Gurney, Andrew Karr, Mark Savela, Craig Van Den Biggelaar | "Air" | Nominated |
| 2011 | Outstanding Visual Effects in a Broadcast Series | Mark Savela, James Rorick, Craig Vandenbiggelaar, Adam de Bosch Kemper | – | Nominated |

== See also ==
- List of Stargate SG-1 awards and nominations
- List of Stargate Atlantis awards and nominations
