= Small Victories =

- Stargate SG-1 episode
- Major Carter and Thor, with a Replicator hologram in the background
- Episode no.: Season 4 Episode 1
- Directed by: Martin Wood
- Written by: Robert C. Cooper
- Production code: 401
- Original air date: June 30, 2000

Guest appearances
- Colin Cunningham as Paul Davis; Teryl Rothery as Janet Fraiser; Dan Shea as Siler; Yurij Kis as Yuri; Dmitry Chepovetsky as Boris

Episode chronology
← Previous "Nemesis (Part 1)"	Next → "The Other Side"
- Stargate SG-1 (season 4)

"Small Victories" is the first episode from season four of the science fiction television series Stargate SG-1. Penned by Robert C. Cooper and directed by Martin Wood, the episode first aired on the American subscription channel Showtime on June 30, 2000. "Small Victories" resumes the story of the season 3 finale, "Nemesis", in which the SG-1 team encountered the Replicators for the first time. As the Replicators threaten Earth and the Asgard home galaxy, the team must split to master their job.

"Small Victories" was another visual effects milestone for the series. The Replicators and the Asgard character Thor were computer-animated for parts of the episode. Some scenes were filmed in and outside of a Russian Foxtrot class submarine. "Small Victories" was nominated for Best Special Effects in 2001 for an Emmy, a Gemini Award and a Leo Award.

== Plot ==
Confident that the destruction of Thor's starship has ended the Replicator threat to Earth ("Nemesis"), the SG-1 team returns home through the second Stargate that has been put up at Stargate Command. Shortly after they learn that a Russian Foxtrot class submarine has been hijacked by creatures whose descriptions match the Replicators, Thor arrives at Stargate Command and asks SG-1 for help against the Replicators in the Asgard galaxy. As Colonel O'Neill (Richard Dean Anderson), Daniel Jackson (Michael Shanks) and Teal'c (Christopher Judge) go to deal with the hijacked submarine, Major Carter (Amanda Tapping) goes with Thor.

O'Neill, Daniel, and Teal'c try to obtain intelligence on the little self-replicating robotic invaders in the submarine, but they are forced to fall back. With Daniel's new theory that the Replicators are made up of the same materials they consume, the Replicators may be eliminated through sinking the iron submarine as long as the surviving Replicator from Thor's advanced ship is destroyed beforehand. Meanwhile, Carter witnesses a short battle against the Replicators in the Asgard galaxy during which five Asgard ships are lost. Carter notices the Replicators' attraction to new technology and proposes to use the O'Neill, an incomplete Asgard ship originally designed to fight the Replicators, as a lure to draw the Replicators into hyperspace and destroy them in the O'Neill's self-destruct. Thor eventually accepts the plan, the Replicators take the bait and are destroyed.

Back on Earth, O'Neill and Teal'c penetrate the submarine and find and destroy the original Replicator. When the other Replicators take full control of the submarine, O'Neill orders the forces outside to destroy the submarine and prepares for the end, but Thor beams the team onto his ship before the explosion occurs. With the imminent Replicator threat over, Thor promises that when the Asgard defeat the Replicators, he will come to assist Earth in the war against the Goa'uld.

== Production ==
=== Writing and pre-production ===
Visual effects supervisor James Tichenor approached producer Robert C. Cooper after the completion of the season 3 finale, "Nemesis", and stated his confidence in his team's ability to create effects for a water-based episode. By that time, Cooper had already written the outline of "Small Victories" as the season 4 opener. "Small Victories" resumes the cliffhanger ending of "Nemesis" and alludes to events of that episode several times. The episode begins aboard a Russian submarine where one Russian says in his mother tongue that the noise in the torpedo tube might be caused by "one of the bugs from the other episode", an in-joke that the producers intentionally left without subtitles. Daniel Jackson's appendicitis attack from "Nemesis" is picked up, which was originally based on Michael Shanks' real-life appendicitis attack during the filming of the penultimate season 3 episode. "Small Victories" also continues building the relationship of O'Neill and Carter in mirroring a similar scene from "Nemesis". However, Christopher Judge, who in previous seasons sported a bald-shaven head as the alien Teal'c, returned to the set with a small blond chin beard after the hiatus, as the producers had not allowed his character to have scalp hair (until season 8). Judge shaved off the beard several episodes later after acknowledging its look as silly. The official Showtime website initially caused some confusion by listing Jay Acovone (Kawalsky) as a guest-star in this episode, which later turned out to be untrue.

=== Filming ===
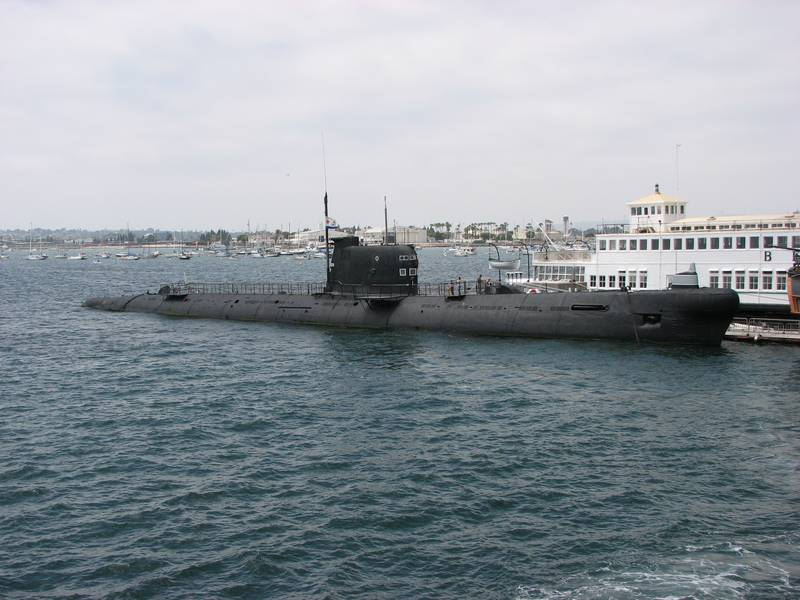
Some scenes of "Small Victories" were filmed aboard Foxtrot-class submarine B-39, seen here in 2007.

"Small Victories" was filmed over the course of seven days like most SG-1 episodes. After the first three seasons of Stargate SG-1 had been filmed on 16 mm film (except for shots incorporating visual effects, where experience had shown 35 mm to work better), "Nemesis" was filmed entirely on 35 mm film as a test run, and season 4 switched to the new gauge for all filming purposes.

Martin Wood directed "Small Victories" and made a short cameo appearance with Sergeant Siler (stunt coordinator Dan Shea) in an SGC corridor. Andy Mikita served as the second unit director and filmed the coverage of the practical Thor puppet after Amanda Tapping's coverage had been shot. Michael Shanks, who provided the voice of Thor in post-production ADR, read some of Thor's lines for Tapping on-set. The top lip of the Thor puppet, which was visibly broken during the filming, proved a challenge. One anecdotal blooper moment that Amanda Tapping often tells at conventions and which producer Joseph Mallozzi named one of his favorites in the first five years of Stargate SG-1, is that of the puppeteers raising Thor's hand to touch Tapping's behind during filming. Tapping instinctively slapped the expensive prop, then she kneeled down and apologized to the puppet in all seriousness before realizing the silliness of her reaction.

"Small Victories" is split into two parallel storylines, and several space shots of the B story onboard Thor's spaceship were cut at the script stage to allot more money to the A story submarine scenes. "Small Victories" was originally written to set on a fishing trawler until the producers got access to the decommissioned Russian Foxtrot-class submarine B-39, which was brought from Vladivostok to Vancouver Island in 1996. Several scenes were filmed in and outside of the submarine for two days. A matching set with removable walls was built later on because only three film crew members could fit into the real 25-feet-wide submarine. To enhance the submarine's narrowness, Martin Wood lit the ship with the actors' helmet lights and chose an agitated shooting style, holding the shots tight and handholding some of the cameras himself. The logistics of the submarine filming proved difficult and time-consuming, since the computer-generated Replicators needed to appear on Daniel's playback monitors in advance of filming. One scripted scene in which a Replicator piece is removed from Teal'c's shoulder was trimmed on-set because the actors felt it to be redundant.

=== Effects ===
"Small Victories" surpassed "Nemesis" as the biggest visual-effects-heavy Stargate SG-1 episode and remained one of biggest visual effects works of the season. Nevertheless, the limited budget required the major Computer-generated imagery (CGI) moments to be chosen well. The opening sequence of the Asgard ship flying over the ocean until its crash into the water was completely computer-generated, as was the Asgard homeworld at a later point in the episode. The finetuning of the lighting of the Asgard homeworld, which was blended with a matte painting of Asgard space ships in the sky, was the most difficult job. To save costs, the moments before Thor's entry to the SGC were stockshots of the Stargate, and the illusion of a Stargate event horizon behind Thor in the following scenes was created with an LCD projection. Although a computer-generated version of Thor was built around the puppet for independent movements, the CGI version's walking down the Stargate ramp was intercut with filmed shots of the puppet put on a trike.

Visual effects producer James Tichenor claimed that visual effects work better when not highlighted, and that a major part of effective visual effects are the actors' reactions to nonexistent things. Replicator models were used to give the actors an idea at what they were looking and to match their eyelines. One model was mounted on a plexiglass rod and shown on-screen, giving the impression of an organic Replicator hologram. The computer-generated Replicators on board the submarine were tracked with small lights, some of which post-production left in for good looks. The reflections of the green screen on the floor aboard Thor's ship ("green spill", usually an undesired side effect) were used to key selective patches for the reflection of the big spaceship screen.

== Reception ==
"Small Victories" was first broadcast on June 30, 2000, on Showtime. SG-1 visual effects producer James Tichenor considered the few episodes with big visual effects budgets the most likely works to contain visual cues that impress Academy of Television Arts & Sciences (Emmy Awards) voters, but he feared that the 2000 submarine feature film U-571 might spoil expectations. "Small Victories" and the SG-1 season 4 finale "Exodus" were nominated for a 2001 Emmy in the category "Outstanding Special Visual Effects for a Series", but they lost to Star Trek: Voyager's "Endgame". "Small Victories" was also nominated for a Gemini Award and a Leo Award in the respective "Best Visual Effects" categories, but failed to win either.

In his book Approaching the Possible, Jo Storm considered "Small Victories" "one of the most enthralling episodes" that makes the audience forget that it used nearly the same premise that was used in "Nemesis". He thought the episode was "especially big on the Sam/Jack dynamic" as the characters "toe the line between fraternal teasing and downright chemistry". He saluted Amanda Tapping's comedic opportunities and called her character's reaction to Asgard food "priceless". He also noted the character development of Daniel Jackson in a military environment, contrasting it with the character's attitude in the season 1 episode "Thor's Hammer" where his military mind was less developed.
