= Nemesis (Stargate SG-1) =

- Stargate SG-1 episode
- Episode no.: Season 3 Episode 22
- Directed by: Martin Wood
- Written by: Robert C. Cooper
- Production code: 322
- Original air date: February 11, 2000

Guest appearances
- Colin Cunningham as Major Paul Davis; Gary Jones as Walter Harriman

Episode chronology
| ← Previous "Crystal Skull" | Next → "Small Victories" |
- Stargate SG-1 (season 3)

"Nemesis" is the last episode from season 3 of the science fiction television series Stargate SG-1. Written by Robert C. Cooper and directed by Martin Wood, the episode first aired in the United Kingdom on Sky One on February 11, 2000, and had its American premiere on Showtime on March 8, 2000. The episode sets up the Replicators as a new major enemy, ending in a cliffhanger that is resumed in the season 4 premiere "Small Victories".

"Nemesis" was the first SG-1 episode to be filmed entirely on 35 mm film before the series switched from 16 mm film to 35 mm film for all purposes in season 4. A visual effects milestone for the series, the episode was nominated for an Emmy Award in the "Outstanding Special Visual Effects for a Series" category, and won a Leo Award for "Best Overall Sound in a Dramatic Series".

== Plot ==
The SG-1 team gets leave time as Daniel Jackson (Michael Shanks) had his appendix removed. Just after Major Carter (Amanda Tapping) declines Colonel O'Neill's (Richard Dean Anderson) invitation to go fishing, O'Neill is beamed aboard the cloaked Asgard ship Beliskner orbiting Earth. Encountering bug-like robots, O'Neill learns from the dying Asgard, Thor, that the creatures are called Replicators. They ingest the ship's alloys in order to self-replicate and will eventually land on Earth in the search of more raw material. O'Neill contacts Stargate Command with a request to beam up explosives, however, General Hammond (Don S. Davis) also sends along Carter and Teal'c (Christopher Judge) against O'Neill's wishes. An Earth shuttle may be sent to pick them up later.

SG-1 plan to steer the vessel towards Earth to vaporize it during atmospheric reentry. Because the Replicators prevent SG-1 from retaking the bridge, Carter and Thor suggest placing an elementary naqahdah-enhanced bomb on the deceleration drive. When Teal'c leaves the spaceship to place the bomb on the outside of the hull, his airtank blows, however, Carter manages to beam him back on board. Thor, whose vitals crash at this moment, is put into a stasis pod to preserve his life.

While SG-1 waits for the right time to detonate the bomb, they must devise a plan to get off the ship. They eventually beam Stargate Command's Stargate on-board and intend to travel to the planet P3X-234 before returning home using Earth's secondary gate ("Touchstone"). After Teal'c has dialed the gate manually, O'Neill detonates the bomb, crashing the ship in the Pacific Ocean. The last shot of the episode shows a Replicator crawling on remains of the sinking spaceship.

== Production ==
The season 3 finale "Nemesis" was written by Robert C. Cooper and directed by Martin Wood. After the first three seasons of Stargate SG-1 had been filmed on 16 mm film (although scenes involving visual effects had always been shot on 35 mm film for various technical reasons), "Nemesis" was the first episode filmed entirely on 35 mm film. Stargate SG-1 switched to 35 mm film for all purposes at the beginning of season 4. The visual effects team used the episode to experiment with the design of the Replicators, a new recurring enemy to whom the character Thor had first alluded in the early season 3 episode "Fair Game". "Nemesis" featured more visual effects than any previous episode, but was excelled by the season 4 premiere, "Small Victories", which showed the best computer-generated shots of "Nemesis" in its "Previously on" segment. Visual effects supervisor James Tichenor considered the few episodes with big visual effects budgets the most likely works to contain visual cues that impress Academy of Television Arts & Sciences (Emmy Awards) voters. Tichenor claimed that effective visual effects do not call attention to themselves and instead rely on the actors' reactions to nonexistent things.

Daniel Jackson's appendicitis reflected Michael Shanks' real-world condition at the end of season 3. During the last shooting day of "Crystal Skull", Shanks suffered an appendicitis attack, which he had first misinterpreted as food poisoning from Thanksgiving dinner. While Robert C. Cooper desperately tried to rewrite the script of "Nemesis", producer Brad Wright contrived elaborate storylines to reduce Shanks' involvement in the episode. Cooper eventually decided to use a common health issue to explain Daniel's absence from the episode's action scenes. Shanks appeared in four scenes set at Stargate Command, although he also provided the voice of the Asgard Thor in post-production. Although much of Daniel's and O'Neill's exchange in the infirmary was improvised, critic Jo Storm speculated in his book Approaching The Possible that Daniel's question in the infirmary bed to O'Neill ("Did you get a haircut?") may reflect the actors' hairstyles which had significantly changed since the season 2 finale; the lines may have been added to appease the many viewers who had commented on the characters' new looks on the online boards. "Nemesis" was the last episode before actor Christopher Judge started sporting a small blond beard for several episodes in season 4.

== Reception ==
"Nemesis" first aired in the United Kingdom on Sky One on February 11, 2000, and had its American premiere on Showtime on March 8, 2000. In Germany, "Nemesis" was held back from season 3 and aired as the first hour of the season 4 premiere. Airing in American broadcast syndication during the 2001 May sweeps, "Nemesis" had a 2.7/2.8 household rating, which helped Stargate SG-1's placement as second among first-run entertainment hours (a second airing after a premiere on an American subscription channel is not regarded as an off-network rerun) and placed fifth overall in the U.S. syndication market. "Nemesis" was nominated for an Emmy in the "Outstanding Special Visual Effects" category in 2000, but lost to the X-Files episode "First Person Shooter"; the other competitors were Star Trek: Voyager episodes "Life Line" and "The Haunting of Deck Twelve", and the X-Files episode "Rush". "Nemesis" won a Leo Award for "Best Overall Sound In A Dramatic Series" in 2000.

Jo Storm wrote that the "cleverly disguised action mini-arc" gives insight into the imperfection of the Asgard and that the "foreign, creepy" Replicators are "conquerors who make the Goa'uld look nice by comparison". She felt that the episode had "all the classic elements of fiction", and lauded Robert C. Cooper's storytelling idea to take the Stargate from the SGC and Don S. Davis's following "best nonspeaking moment". In Storm's mind, the visual effects were well-placed and did not overthrow the story, but she wondered about the "ubiquitous Sam/Jack interest". If not interpreted as "flirtatiousness", Carter could be "truly touched at being let into the 'inner circle' of [O'Neill's] life, and finally being 'one of the guys'".
