= Stargate SG-1 =

Science fiction television series (1997–2007)

- Genre: Action-adventure; Military science fiction
- Created by: Brad Wright; Jonathan Glassner
- Based on: Stargate by Roland Emmerich; Dean Devlin
- Starring: Richard Dean Anderson; Michael Shanks; Amanda Tapping; Christopher Judge; Don S. Davis; Corin Nemec; Ben Browder; Beau Bridges; Claudia Black
- Theme music composer: Joel Goldsmith; David Arnold
- Composers: Joel Goldsmith; Richard Band; Dennis McCarthy; Kevin Kiner
- Countries of origin: Canada; United States
- Original language: English
- No. of seasons: 10
- No. of episodes: 214 + 2 DVD films (list of episodes)

Production
- Executive producers: Jonathan Glassner (1–8); Brad Wright (1–6, 8–9); Robert C. Cooper (5–10); Joseph Mallozzi (8–10); Paul Mullie (8–10); Richard Dean Anderson (2–8); Michael Greenburg (1–8)
- Running time: 44 minutes
- Production companies: Double Secret Productions; Gekko Film Corp. (1997–2005; seasons 1–8); MGM Television; Sony Pictures Television (2005–2006; season 9)

Original release
- Network: Showtime
- Release: July 27, 1997 – May 17, 2002
- Network: Sci Fi
- Release: June 7, 2002 – June 22, 2007

Related
- Stargate; Stargate Atlantis; Stargate: The Ark of Truth; Stargate: Continuum; Stargate Universe

Stargate SG-1 (abbreviated as SG-1) is a military science fiction adventure television series within Metro-Goldwyn-Mayer's Stargate franchise. The show, created by Brad Wright and Jonathan Glassner, is based on the 1994 science fiction film Stargate by Dean Devlin and Roland Emmerich. The television series was filmed in and around the city of Vancouver, British Columbia, Canada. The series premiered on Showtime on July 27, 1997, and moved to the Sci Fi Channel on June 7, 2002; the series finale aired on Sky1 on March 13, 2007.

The series was a ratings success for its first-run broadcasters and in syndication and was particularly popular in Europe and Australia. Stargate SG-1's awards include eight Emmy nominations. It also spawned the animated television series Stargate Infinity, the live-action spin-off TV series Stargate Atlantis, Stargate Universe, and Stargate Origins, and the direct-to-DVD films Stargate: The Ark of Truth and Stargate: Continuum. Merchandise for Stargate SG-1 includes games and toys, print media, and an original audio series.

== Series overview ==
The series' main cast

The plot of Stargate SG-1 picks up a year after the conclusion of the events recounted in the original feature film. It follows the adventures of SG-1, a military team from Earth. SG-1 and a dozen other SG teams venture to distant planets using an alien portal known as a Stargate, which in the series is housed in a top-secret United States Air Force military base known as Stargate Command (SGC) in the underground Cheyenne Mountain Complex in Colorado Springs, Colorado. The mission of the SG teams is to explore the galaxy and search for alien technology and allies to defend Earth against alien threats such as the Goa'uld (a snake-like parasitic alien race from planet P3X-888 that takes humans as unwilling hosts), the Replicators, and the Ori. As explained in the series' backstory, the Goa'uld had transported human slaves from Earth to other habitable planets across the galaxy thousands of years ago and now pose as gods of old Earth mythologies, particularly Ancient Egypt. The series also draws upon Greek, Roman, and Norse mythology, as well as the legend of King Arthur. SG-1 eventually learns that highly evolved human-like beings, known as the Ancients, had originally built the Stargate network millions of years earlier, before ascending to a higher plane of existence, after which they pledged not to interfere in the lives of other species.

=== Apophis Arc ===
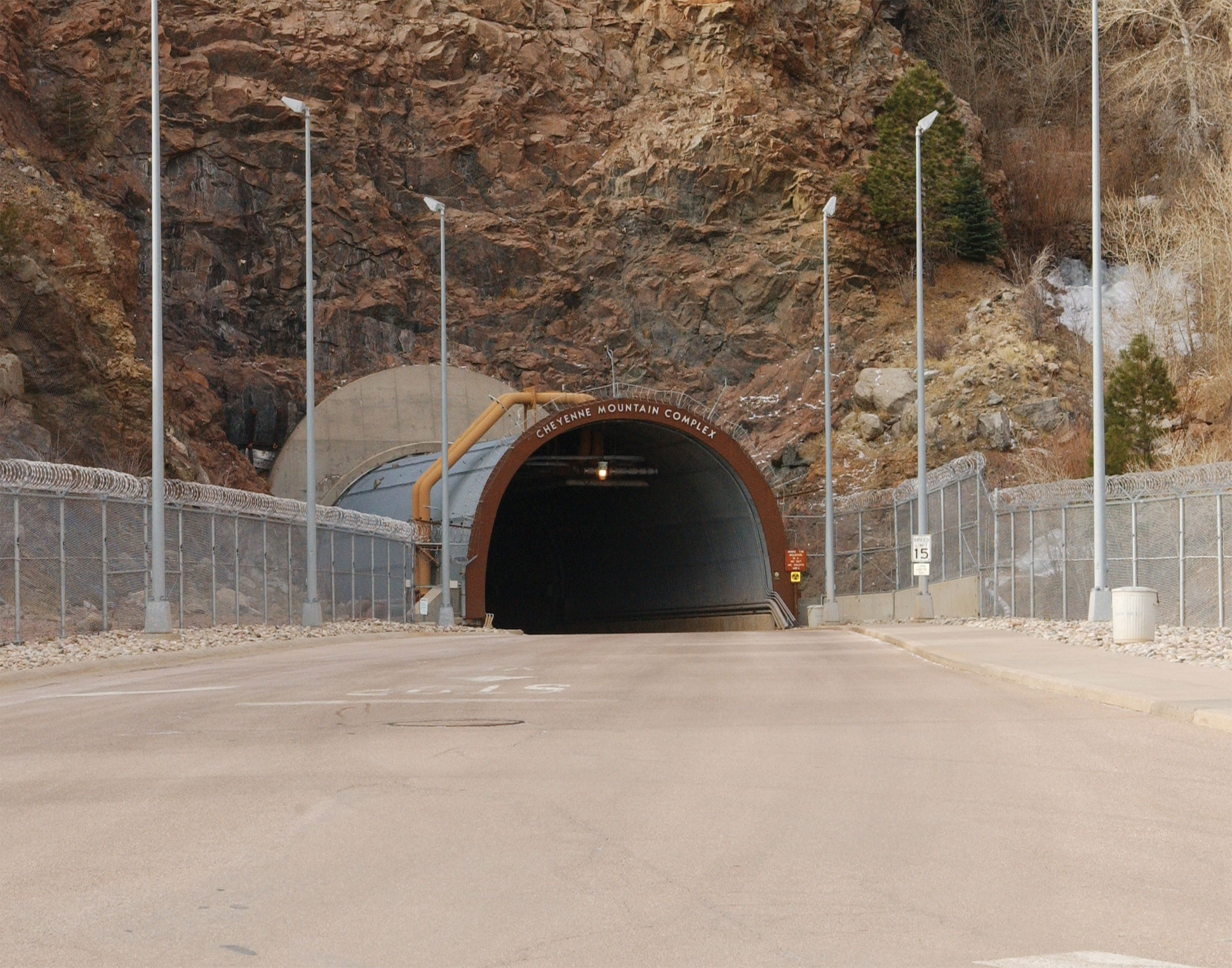
The Cheyenne Mountain Complex in Colorado, United States is home to Earth's fictional Stargate Command in the Stargate universe.

The pilot episode ("Children of the Gods"), set one year after the events of the original feature film, introduces the Goa'uld System Lord Apophis (Peter Williams) as the main antagonist when he attacks Earth's mothballed SGC military base through the Stargate and kidnaps an airman. The SGC is brought back into action when the Stargate is revealed to be part of an interplanetary network connecting countless planets. SG teams are created to help defend Earth against the Goa'uld, who have interstellar pyramid warships and vast armies of Jaffa (hereditary slaves and human incubators to the Goa'uld) at their disposal. Earth's flagship team SG-1, which includes Apophis's defected First Prime (lead Jaffa soldier) Teal'c, initiates several alliances with other cultures in the galaxy, such as the Goa'uld-like but truly symbiotic Tok'ra, the advanced human Tollan, the pacifist Nox, the benevolent Roswell-alien Asgard and remnants of the powerful Ancients. Another alien threat arises in the Season 3 finale ("Nemesis") in the form of sentient machines called Replicators. Meanwhile, rogue agents of a shadowy intelligence agency on Earth, the NID, repeatedly attempt to take control of the Stargate and other alien technology. Despite Apophis's death in the Season 5 premiere ("Enemies"), the Goa'uld Empire remains a major foe in Stargate SG-1 until the end of Season 8.

=== Anubis Arc ===
After Apophis's defeat, the half-Ascended Goa'uld System Lord Anubis (David Palffy) assumes the role of the primary antagonist of the show. This new villain possesses much of the knowledge of the Ancients and their technology. While Earth builds its first interstellar spaceship (the Prometheus) in seasons Season 6 and Season 7, Anubis creates an army of almost invincible Kull Warriors and wipes out or subordinates most of his adversaries amongst the System Lords. In the Season 7 finale ("Lost City"), SG-1 discovers a powerful weapon in an Ancient outpost in Antarctica that annihilates Anubis's entire fleet and also sets the stage for the spin-off series Stargate Atlantis. Ba'al subsumes much of Anubis's power in Season 8, while Anubis, who survived the destruction of his fleet in a disembodied form, quietly begins to re-assert his influence. Human-form Replicators begin to conquer the System Lords, but SG-1 finds and adjusts an Ancient weapon to destroy all Replicators throughout the galaxy. Near the end of Season 8 ("Threads"), it is revealed that the benevolent Ascended being Oma Desala (Mel Harris) is responsible for Anubis's original ascension. When she engages Anubis in an eternal stalemated battle on the Ascended plane to prevent his acting on the mortal plane, the Replicators and most System Lords have already been annihilated and the Jaffa win their freedom from Goa'uld rule.

=== Ori Arc ===
The original SG-1 team disbands after the events of Season 8 but slowly reunites under new team leader Lt Col. Cameron Mitchell after the SGC inadvertently draws the attention of the Ori to the existence of sentient life in the Milky Way; the Ori are revealed to be a faction of ascended Ancients residing in another galaxy that are diametrically opposed to the Ancients' belief in strict noninterference in the lower planes of existence, sapping the energy from untold billions of "lower beings" (non-ascended sentient beings) by means of their worship in a religion called Origin. While the Ori send enhanced human beings named Priors to the Milky Way to convert the galaxy to Origin, Ba'al and some minor Goa'uld infiltrate Earth through The Trust (a coalition of rogue NID operatives) to rebuild their power. At the end of Season 9 ("Camelot (Part 1)"), the Ori begin an evangelistic crusade with their warships and effortlessly wipe out the combined fleet of Earth and its allies. The leader of the Ori, Adria (Morena Baccarin), is introduced in the premiere of Season 10 ("Flesh and Blood (Part 2)"). SG-1 searches for the Sangraal, an Ancient weapon that might defeat the Ori, while Ba'al and his clones attempt to find the weapon for their own purposes. With the help of the powerful Ancient Merlin (Matthew Walker), SG-1 finds the construction plans of the Sangraal and sends a working version to the Ori galaxy. Shortly thereafter, Adria ascends. The direct-to-DVD film Stargate: The Ark of Truth ends the Ori Arc. The only influential Goa'uld in the last two seasons of Stargate SG-1 is the System Lord Ba'al (Cliff Simon), who is defeated in the direct-to-DVD film Stargate: Continuum.

== Main cast and characters ==
Character	Portrayed by	Seasons										Films	
Character	Portrayed by	1	2	3	4	5	6	7	8	9	10	I	II
Jack O'Neill	Richard Dean Anderson	Main	Main	Main	Main	Main	Main	Main	Main	Guest	Guest		M
Daniel Jackson	Michael Shanks	Main	Main	Main	Main	Main	R	Main	Main	Main	Main	Main	Main
Samantha Carter	Amanda Tapping	Main	Main	Main	Main	Main	Main	Main	Main	Main	Main	Main	Main
Teal'c	Christopher Judge	Main	Main	Main	Main	Main	Main	Main	Main	Main	Main	Main	Main
George Hammond	Don S. Davis	Main	Main	Main	Main	Main	Main	Main	R	Guest	Guest		A
Jonas Quinn	Corin Nemec					G	M	R					
Cameron Mitchell	Ben Browder									Main	Main	Main	Main
Hank Landry	Beau Bridges									Main	Main	Main	A
Vala Mal Doran	Claudia Black								G	R	Main	Main	Main

- Richard Dean Anderson as Jonathan "Jack" O'Neill (Seasons 1–8 main, Seasons 9–10 guest) – A United States Air Force colonel and an Air Force Special Operations veteran who led the original mission through the Stargate in Stargate (where he was played by Kurt Russell). He is coaxed out of retirement in the pilot episode and serves as the leader of the SG-1 team in the first seven seasons. He takes charge of Stargate Command (SGC) after his promotion to brigadier general at the beginning of Season 8. The series repeatedly alludes to romantic feelings between O'Neill and his second-in-command Carter, but the relationship is never shown as consummated outside alternate reality scenarios. O'Neill is reassigned to Washington, D.C. before Season 9 and receives a promotion to major general. He appears in a recurring role in Seasons 9 and 10 of Stargate SG-1, as well as in Stargate: Continuum and in Seasons 1 and 3 of Stargate Atlantis. O'Neill appears as a lieutenant general in multiple episodes of Stargate Universe where he is in command of the Department of Homeworld Security.
- Michael Shanks as Daniel Jackson (Seasons 1–5 and 7–10 main, Season 6 recurring) – A brilliant Egyptologist whose far-fetched theories about Egyptian pyramids having been built by aliens led to his participation in the original Stargate mission in the feature film (where he was played by James Spader). He joins the SG-1 team to facilitate his search for his wife, who was kidnapped by Apophis in the pilot episode, but his naïveté and curiosity regularly create obstacles for the team. Jackson gradually evolves from being an archaeologist and translator into the moral conscience for the team and remains part of SG-1 until he ascends to a higher plane of existence at the end of Season 5. Following his forced de-ascension at the beginning of Season 7, he rejoins SG-1 for the remainder of the series. The last three seasons show, Jackson has a flirtatious yet antagonistic relationship with Vala Mal Doran. Jackson also appears in both direct-to-DVD films, in Seasons 1 and 5 of Stargate Atlantis and in three Stargate Universe episodes.
- Amanda Tapping as Samantha "Sam" Carter (Seasons 1–10 main) – A brilliant young astrophysicist and initially a United States Air Force captain, Carter joins SG-1 under the command of Colonel O'Neill in the pilot episode. Following her promotion to major in Season 3, she is later promoted to lieutenant colonel early in Season 8 and assumes command of SG-1. Carter assists Lieutenant Colonel Cameron Mitchell in Seasons 9 and 10. After her appearance in Stargate: The Ark of Truth, Carter is promoted to full colonel and becomes the new commander of the Atlantis expedition in Season 4 of Stargate Atlantis before joining SG-1 again for Stargate: Continuum. Carter appears in a recurring role in all seasons of Stargate Atlantis and in the first episode of Stargate Universe as commander of the starship George Hammond.
- Christopher Judge as Teal'c (Seasons 1–10 main) – A quiet and strong Jaffa alien who defects from his position as the First Prime of the Goa'uld Apophis. He joins SG-1 after the first episode in hopes of leading his race to freedom. Despite achieving this goal at the end of Season 8, Teal'c remains a member of SG-1 until the end of the series. He also appears in both direct-to-DVD films and in Season 4 of Stargate Atlantis as a mentor for Ronon Dex during an interview for the IOA.
- Don S. Davis as George Hammond (Seasons 1–7 main, Seasons 8–10 recurring) – A United States Air Force major general (later lieutenant general) who heads Stargate Command in the first seven seasons. Besides recurring in Seasons 8 through 10 of Stargate SG-1, Hammond also appears in Season 1 of Stargate Atlantis. Davis died from a heart attack in June 2008, making his appearance in Stargate: Continuum his last.
- Corin Nemec as Jonas Quinn (Season 6 main, Season 5 guest and 7 recurring) – A humanoid alien and scientist from the country of Kelowna on the planet Langara. Jackson sacrifices his life leading to his ascension at the end of Season 5 in an attempt to save Kelowna, but the subsequent gleeful reaction of the Kelownan leaders causes Quinn to turn his back on Langara. Jonas is a fast learner and fills Daniel's empty spot on SG-1 in Season 6. Following Daniel's return, Jonas returns to his planet and remains a recurring character in Season 7.
- Ben Browder as Cameron "Cam" Mitchell (Seasons 9–10 main) – A United States Air Force lieutenant colonel who is assigned as the new commanding officer of SG-1 at the beginning of Season 9. He struggles to reunite its former members under his command and heads SG-1 (with Lieutenant Colonel Carter's assistance) until the end of Season 10. He is promoted to full colonel between his appearances in Stargate: The Ark of Truth and Stargate: Continuum.
- Beau Bridges as Henry "Hank" Landry (Seasons 9–10 main) – A United States Air Force major general and the commander of Stargate Command in Seasons 9 and 10. He is the estranged father of the SGC's medical officer Carolyn Lam and appears in both direct-to-DVD films and in Seasons 2 and 3 of Stargate Atlantis. In Season 10, Episode 13 Hank Landry was President Of The United States, as well as Major General Hank Landry.
- Claudia Black as Vala Mal Doran (Season 10 main, Season 8 guest and 9 recurring) – A con artist from an unnamed planet and a former human host to the Goa'uld Qetesh. Her first appearance in Season 8's "Prometheus Unbound" is the beginning of her relationship with Daniel. In her recurring role in Season 9, Vala and Daniel unintentionally set off the new Ori threat. She is unwillingly impregnated by the Ori, gives birth to daughter Adria, and watches helplessly as Adria grows to adulthood in a few days time. Vala joins SG-1 after giving birth to the new leader of the Ori at the beginning of Season 10 and appears in both direct-to-DVD films.

== Production ==
=== Conception ===
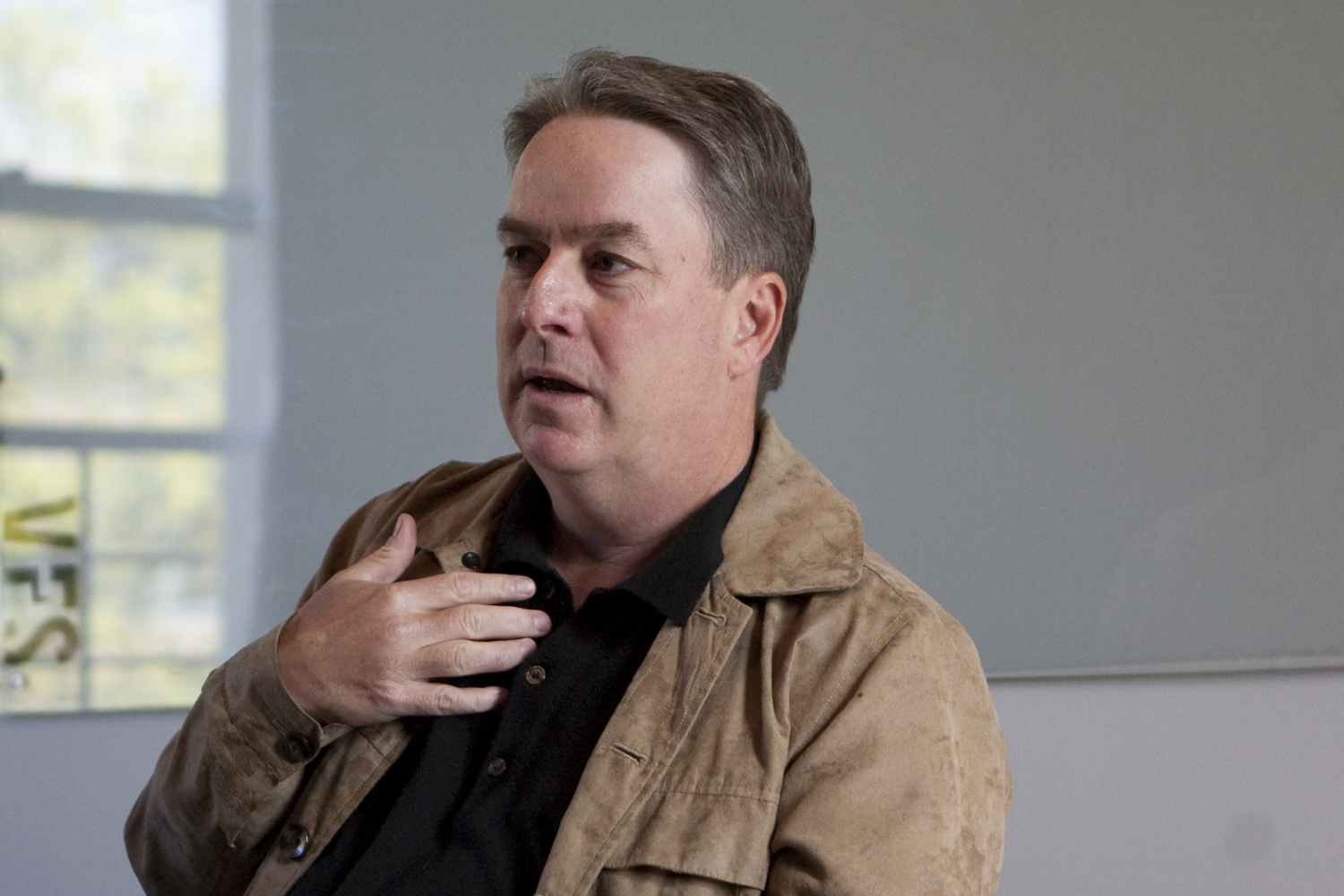
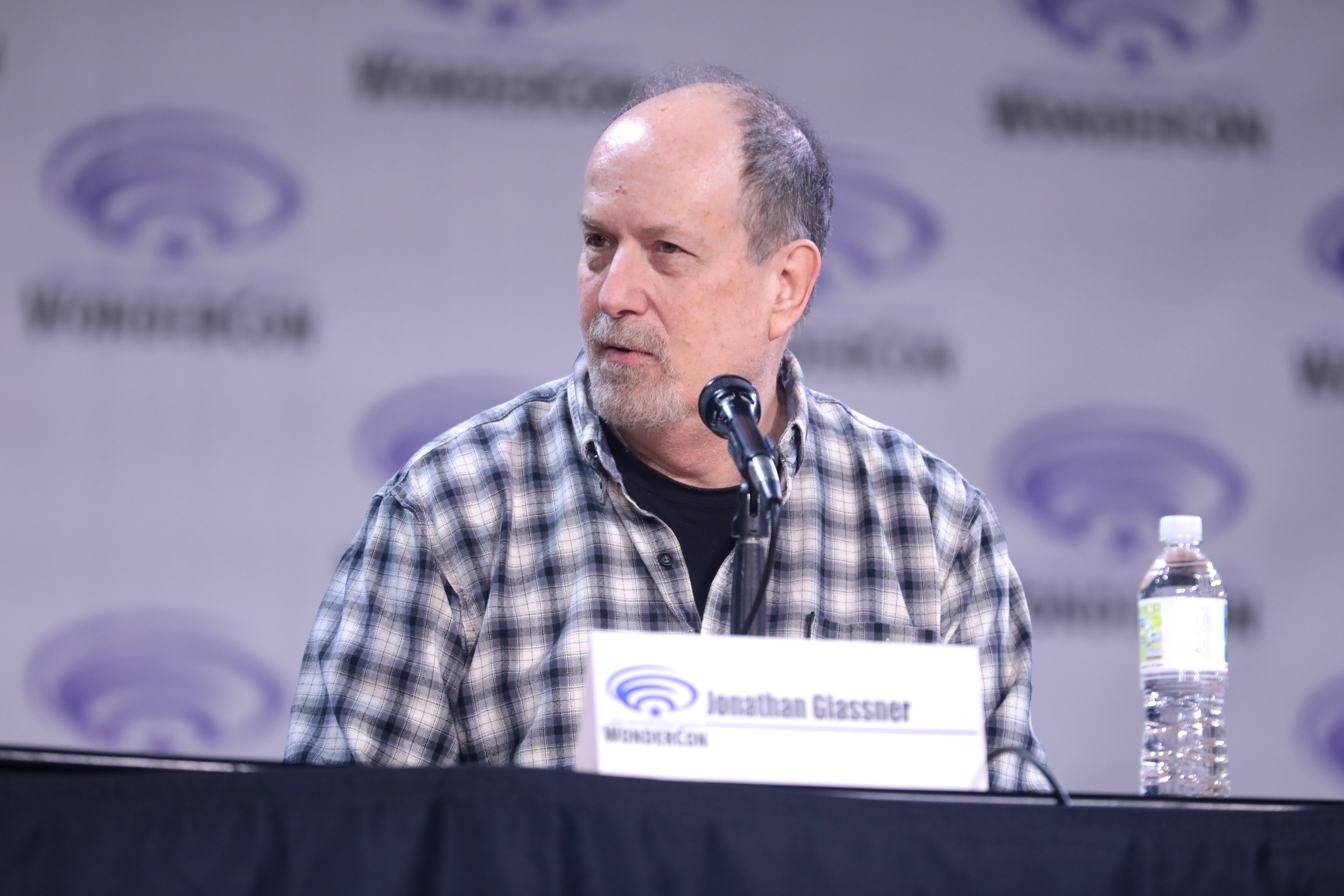
Stargate SG-1 was co-created by Brad Wright (top) and Jonathan Glassner (bottom).

Brad Wright and Jonathan Glassner had worked together on the MGM television series The Outer Limits since 1995. Upon hearing of MGM's plan to create a television spin-off series of the feature film Stargate, Wright and Glassner independently and unbeknownst to each other approached MGM and proposed their concept for the television series. MGM president John Symes greenlit the project on the condition that Wright and Glassner work together as executive producers of the new show. The show was named Stargate SG-1 after Wright flightily agreed to Symes's pitch question of whether the team should be called "SG-1". MGM released posters titled Stargate SG-1 within the next week without the knowledge of Wright or Glassner.

John Symes approached Michael Greenburg and Richard Dean Anderson, former star of the long-running MacGyver. Anderson agreed to become involved if his character Jack O'Neill were allowed more comedic leeway than Kurt Russell's character in the feature film. He also requested that Stargate SG-1 be an ensemble show, so that he would not be carrying most of the plot alone as he had on MacGyver. The American subscription channel Showtime made a two-season commitment for 44 episodes in 1996. Principal photography began in Vancouver in February 1997.

=== Casting and cast changes ===
After Anderson accepted the part, Brad Wright and Jonathan Glassner reviewed several thousand taped auditions and invited approximately 25 promising actors to screen tests in Los Angeles. Michael Shanks, Amanda Tapping and Christopher Judge are said to have gravitated towards each other during the casting process before they knew that they would ultimately be cast. The producers found Judge the easiest to cast due to his muscular presence. Shanks was cast because he did "the perfect imitation of James Spader", according to Wright. The producers knew Don S. Davis from his work as a stand-in and stunt-double for Dana Elcar in MacGyver and approached him to read for the role of George Hammond.

Showtime's announcement that it would not renew Stargate SG-1 after Season 5 coincided with Michael Shanks's decision to leave the show over concerns of being underutilized. The Sci Fi Channel picked up the show and substituted a new character, played by Corin Nemec. Casting agents had met Nemec in the courtyard of MGM's Santa Monica offices by chance and had offered him the role of Jonas Quinn. Addressing rumors that it had forced Shanks's departure, Sci Fi said in February 2002 that the network had "absolutely never requested that any cast changes be made... and although we regret the loss of Michael Shanks, we think that Corin Nemec will be a great new presence in the cast." Nemec's early appearances, beginning with the penultimate episode of Season 5 "Meridian", failed to win over some of the show's fans. Nemec was willing to continue playing the character after Season 6 or in a feature film or a spin-off series. However, the producers reached an agreement with Shanks to return full-time in Season 7, leaving Nemec with a recurring role. Don S. Davis left Stargate SG-1 after Season 7 for health reasons but appeared in a recurring capacity until his death on June 29, 2008.

Due to prior engagements, Claudia Black of Farscape could not accept the offers to guest-star on Stargate SG-1 until the Season 8 episode "Prometheus Unbound". The producers liked the on-screen chemistry between Black's Vala Mal Doran and Shanks's Daniel so much that they re-introduced her in a six-episode story Arc to cover for the maternity leave of Amanda Tapping at the beginning of Season 9. At the same time, Richard Dean Anderson left the show to spend more time with his daughter (his schedule had been reduced incrementally since Season 6). The role of the leading man was filled by Ben Browder (also of Farscape), who had met with the Stargate producers as soon as the introduction of new main characters for Season 9 was discussed. The producers had met him during sci-fi conventions and had previously discussed casting him in other Stargate roles. The producers approached Emmy Award-winning actor Beau Bridges directly to play the role of Hank Landry. Claudia Black's guest appearances were so popular with the cast, crew and audience that the actress returned for the last two Season 9 episodes (with her pregnancy worked into the plot) and she joined the cast full-time in Season 10.

=== Crew ===
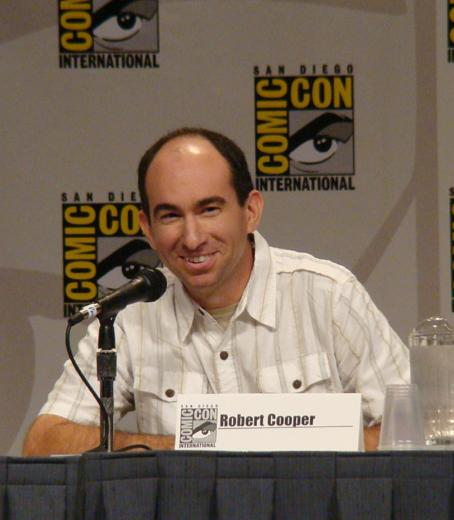
Robert C. Cooper became SG-1's show runner in Season 7.

Most of the producers, crew members and guest actors involved in Stargate SG-1 were Canadian. Creators Brad Wright and Jonathan Glassner were executive producers and show runners of Stargate SG-1 in the first three seasons, having the final say (besides MGM and the network) on stories, designs, effects, casting, editing and episode budgets. After Glassner's departure, Wright ran Stargate SG-1 alone for three seasons. Executive producer Robert C. Cooper took over as show-runner in Season 7 when Brad Wright took time off to develop the spin-off series Stargate Atlantis. Cooper and Wright remained show-runners of their respective shows until the end of SG-1. Also serving as executive and co-executive producers were Michael Greenburg and Richard Dean Anderson (Seasons 1–8), N. John Smith (Seasons 4–10) and the writer team Joseph Mallozzi, Minh Quach and Paul Mullie (Seasons 7–10).

Although Stargate SG-1 employed freelance writers, most of the 214 Stargate SG-1 episodes were written by Brad Wright (Seasons 1–10), Jonathan Glassner (Seasons 1–3), Katharyn Powers (Seasons 1–6), Robert C. Cooper (Seasons 1–10), Peter DeLuise (Seasons 4–8), Joseph Mallozzi & Paul Mullie (Seasons 4–10), Damian Kindler (Seasons 6–10) and Alan McCullough (Seasons 9–10). Martin Wood and Peter DeLuise directed the most episodes, with 46 episodes (Seasons 1–10) and 57 episodes (Seasons 2–10), respectively. Wood and DeLuise regularly made cameo appearances in their episodes and notably played the show-within-a-show directors in the cameo-heavy milestone episodes "Wormhole X-Treme!" and "200". Andy Mikita had been an assistant director since the pilot episode and directed 29 episodes from Season 3–10. SG-1 director of photography Peter Woeste and camera operator William Waring directed 13 episodes each. Most staff writers and staff directors held producer positions. Several cast members also contributed story ideas and directed SG-1 episodes.

=== Filming ===
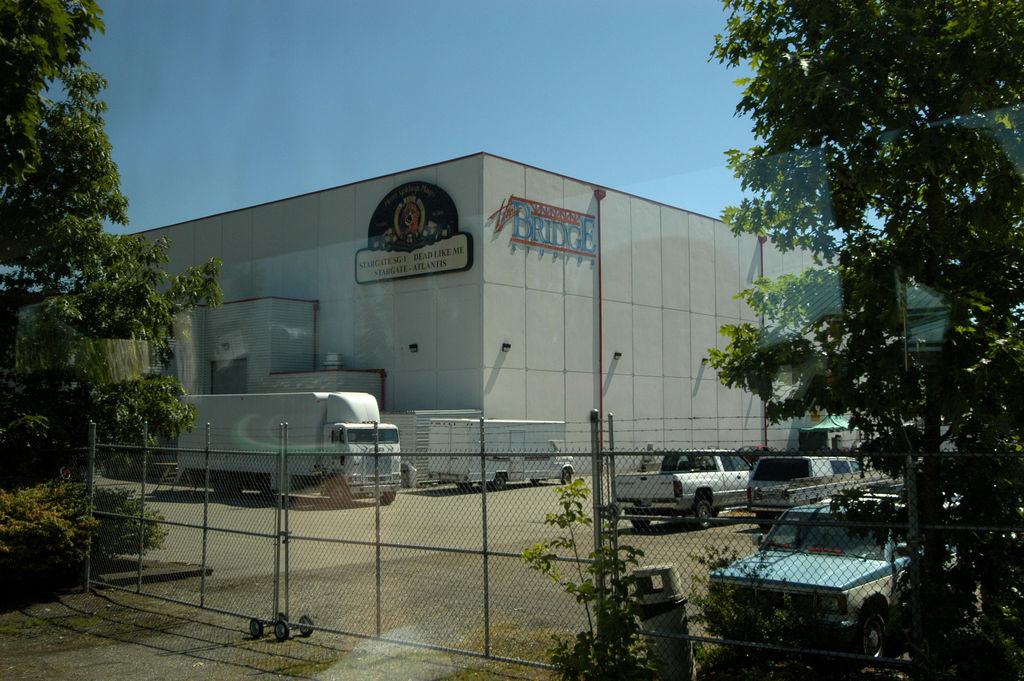
Stargate SG-1 was filmed at The Bridge Studios in Burnaby, British Columbia, Canada.

Stargate SG-1 was filmed in and around Vancouver, British Columbia, mainly at The Bridge Studios and NORCO Studios, which offered Stargate SG-1 tax breaks throughout its run. The cost of an SG-1 episode increased from US$1.3 million in the first seasons to an estimated US$2 million per episode in Season 10, partly due to unfavorable exchange rates. Many Vancouver area landmarks were incorporated into the episodes, such as the campus of Simon Fraser University, which became the setting of the capital of the Tollan, an alien civilization. Production faced many weather problems because of the moderate oceanic climate of Vancouver, although rain could be eliminated from film. The Season 3 episode "Crystal Skull" was the first episode to be filmed on a virtual set.

The main setting of Stargate SG-1, the fictional Stargate Command (SGC) at the (real) Cheyenne Mountain Air Force Station near Colorado Springs, Colorado, was filmed at stage 5 of The Bridge Studios. Martin Wood filmed half a dozen stock shots of the real Cheyenne Mountain complex for use in the series approximately ten days before the premiere of the pilot episode. Although these shots wore out over the years, the producers did not film new shots until the beginning of Season 9, thinking that Stargate SG-1 would be cancelled after each current year. By then, visitor questions and fan theories about the existence of a Stargate at the real Cheyenne Mountain complex had become so common that Cheyenne Mountain had installed a seemingly high-security door labeled "Stargate Command" for one of their storage rooms holding brooms and detergent.

The first seven seasons had 22 episodes each, which was reduced to 20 episodes for the last three seasons. Episodes of the first seasons were filmed over a period of 7.5 working days, which decreased to a targeted average of six working days in the last seasons. All episodes were filmed in 16:9 wide-screen, although Stargate SG-1 was broadcast in 4:3 aspect ratio in its first years. The transition to the broadcast of episodes in the wider 16:9 ratio gave directors more freedom in frame composition. The first three seasons of Stargate SG-1 were filmed on 16 mm film, notwithstanding scenes involving visual effects that had always been shot on 35 mm film for various technical reasons. After a test run with the Season 3 finale, "Nemesis", Stargate SG-1 switched to 35 mm film for all purposes at the beginning of Season 4. Digital HD cameras were used for filming beginning with Season 8.

=== Production design ===
The art department generated all of the concepts and drawing for the prop department, the set decoration department, the construction department, the paint department and the model shop. They also collaborated with the visual effects department. Stargate SG-1 employed about 200 Canadian union workers, although that number could exceed 300 when new sets were built. Lead production designer Richard Hudolin joined the project in October 1996. Bridget McGuire, SG-1's art director since the pilot episode, took over as lead production designer in Season 6.

Hudolin flew to Los Angeles in 1996 to gather material from the feature film as reference and found the original Stargate prop stored outside in the Californian desert. Although the prop had severely deteriorated, he was able to take a detailed mold for Stargate SG-1 production to build its own prop. The new Stargate was engineered to turn, to lock the chevrons and to be computer-controlled to dial specific gate addresses. A portable Stargate prop was built for on-location shoots and required six workers and one full day to set up. Since visual effects are sometimes faster and cheaper, a computer-generated Stargate was occasionally used in on-location shoots in later seasons.

The SGC set had to be twice as high for shooting as the 22-foot-tall (6.7 m) Stargate prop, but one of Hudolin's original plans of a three-level set was rejected in favor of a two-level set. The gateroom was the biggest room on set and could be redesigned for other scenes. Two multi-purpose rooms were frequently redecorated into the infirmary, Daniel's lab, the cafeteria or the gym. The SGC set and all other sets from the pilot episode were constructed within six weeks in January and February 1997, incorporating some original set pieces from the feature film. The SGC set would be largely dismantled in late 2008 to make room for the Icarus Base set of Stargate Universe.

=== Make-up and costumes ===
Most of the main SG-1 characters are US airmen and wear authentic United States Air Force uniforms. During missions, the members of the SG-1 team normally wear olive green Battle Dress Uniforms. Richard Dean Anderson and Don S. Davis received a regular military-style haircut on set. Amanda Tapping had her hair comparably short until the filming of the direct-to-DVD films. Playing a civilian, Michael Shanks adopted James Spader's hairstyle from the feature film but cut it short for the Season 2 finale and subsequent seasons. The Jaffa alien Teal'c (Christopher Judge) was the only main character whose look required more than basic make-up. His Egyptian look was reflective of the Goa'uld Ra from the feature film and was complemented with a forehead symbol and a gold skin tone, although his make-up process was simplified over the years. Judge shaved his head at home each day until the producers allowed him to let his hair grow in Season 8. As a trained nurse, key make-up artist Jan Newman could make burns, cuts, bruises and the SG-1 team's other wounds look authentic.

For the look of aliens, the make-up department collaborated with prosthetics companies from Vancouver and Los Angeles, including Steve Johnson's XFX (first three seasons only) & Todd Masters. While the human origins of many alien races and human civilizations were left recognizable, the recurring characters who were members of the Unas race required elaborate prosthetics and make-up work. To convey the cultural origins of the various fictional human civilizations living on different planets after their displacement from Earth, the costume designers combined elements of their respective Earth cultures with modern fabrics, elaborate trims and chains to produce a historically rooted yet otherworldly appearance. The look of the Goa'uld such as Apophis was initially based on the look of Ra in the feature film. For the design of the Ori and the Priors in Season 9, the art department looked at Japanese and samurai garments for costume design. Art director James Robbins found the face painting, scarification and burns of remote jungle tribes mystical and these served as inspiration for the face scarification of the Priors and the Doci. Early ideas to include finger extensions and scarification on these characters' hands were discarded as impracticable.

=== Visual effects ===
Stargate SG-1 was one of the biggest employers in the Vancouver visual effects market, spending $400,000 per episode. The largest role was played by Rainmaker Digital Effects, whose senior digital compositing artist Bruce Woloshyn worked approximately 10 months a year in close collaboration with SG-1's visual effects supervisor/producer James Tichenor and visual effects supervisor Michelle Comens. Many companies were hired to create the Stargate's water-like event horizon in the beginning, but Rainmaker eventually became the only company to create those visual effects. Rainmaker's regular effects shots included the activation and use of the Stargate itself (with well over 300 event horizon shots in the first few years), the transport rings, and the blast shots of the staff weapons and zat guns. They created the visual effects for Goa'uld cargo ships and death gliders on a less regular basis.

Lost Boys Studios provided visual effects for SG-1 from the very beginning of the series up to the end of Season 5, and Image Engine worked on the show from Season 2. Stargate SG-1 and Stargate Atlantis were responsible for an estimated 30% to 40% of the business of Atmosphere Visual Effects. James Tichenor considered the few episodes with big visual effects budgets the most likely works to contain visual cues that would impress award judges. Stargate SG-1 helped win the local post production shops industry recognition, with Season 4's "Small Victories", Season 5's "Revelations", and Season 7's "Lost City" receiving the most visual effects awards and nominations (see List of awards and nominations received by Stargate SG-1).

=== Music ===
According to composer Joel Goldsmith, Stargate SG-1 had a traditional action-adventure score, "with a sci-fi, fantasy flair" that goes "from comedy to drama to wondrous to suspense to heavy action to ethereal". Brad Wright and Jonathan Glassner had known Goldsmith since the second season of The Outer Limits before they approached him to work on the pilot episode of Stargate SG-1. Goldsmith and David Arnold, the composer of the original feature film score, discussed themes for a television adaptation. The main titles of Stargate SG-1 were a medley of several themes from the feature film, although Goldsmith also wrote a unique end title for SG-1 to establish the show as its own entity. MGM eventually insisted on using Arnold's score in the pilot episode instead of Goldsmith's, but Brad Wright's 2009 direct-to-DVD recut of Children of the Gods uses Goldsmith's original score.

For each episode's score, Goldsmith simulated a real orchestra with a synthesizer palette of an eighty-piece symphony orchestra for budgetary reasons, although he occasionally used two or three musicians for added orchestral authenticity. Goldsmith's long-time assistant Neal Acree started composing additional music for Stargate SG-1 in Season 8. The amount of composed music varied between 12 and 33 minutes out of a 44-minute episode, with an average of around 22 to 26 minutes, making the full symphonic score of SG-1 more time-consuming to create than for general TV shows. Since Goldsmith lived a thousand miles away from Vancouver, he and the producers discussed ideas over the phone and exchanged tapes via FedEx for several years until the show switched to Internet file transfers.

Goldsmith's reliance on Arnold's score decreased over the seasons when Stargate SG-1 departed from the Goa'uld theme and introduced new characters and races. Goldsmith had a thematic approach to races and spaceships. For example, he wanted a mechanical, repetitive musical motif for the Replicators; Gothic, Gregorian and Christian themes were the inspiration for the Ori motif. The Ancient theme was deliberately carried over to Stargate Atlantis. The end of "Lost City" has a basic melody that would become part of the main title of Atlantis per a suggestion by Goldsmith's assistant. Non-original music was rarely used on SG-1, although Goldsmith chose the aria "Vesti la giubba" from Leoncavallo's Pagliacci for season 3's "Shades of Grey". Additionally, Lily Frost's song "Who am I" played in Season 7's "Fragile Balance" and CCR's song "Have You Ever Seen the Rain?" played in the series finale "Unending". A television soundtrack with Goldsmith's adapted score was released in 1997, followed by a best-of release in 2001. In Season 1 Episode 7, "The Nox", the music that played when The Nox appeared was Spinning The Silk from the album Chrysalis by 2002.

=== Opening title sequence ===
Stargate SG-1 has had several opening title sequences, which are generally preceded by a teaser act. The credits are normally sixty seconds long. Richard Dean Anderson was the only SG-1 actor whose name appeared before the show's title. Michael Shanks' name was moved near the end of the opening credits with the appendage "as Daniel Jackson" after his return to the show in Season 7. Some DVD versions of early SG-1 seasons have different opening credits from the television versions, as do the direct-to-DVD films. Composer Joel Goldsmith adapted David Arnold's Stargate feature film score for SG-1's opening title theme, which remained the same during the run of Stargate SG-1 and its direct-to-DVD films.

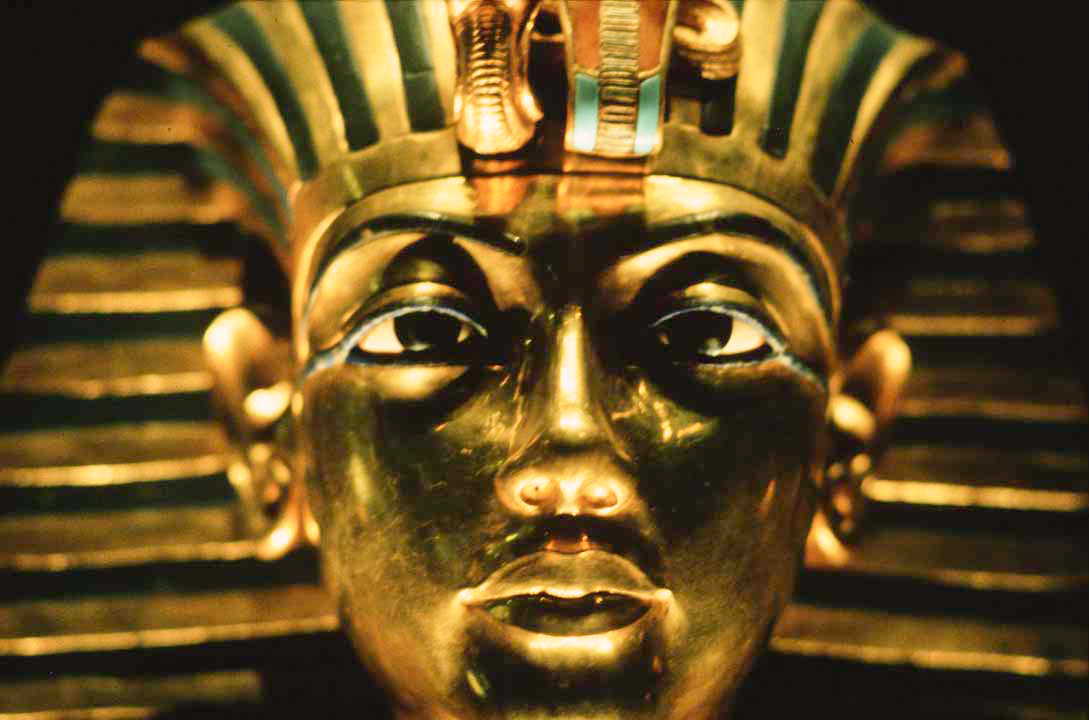
The opening credits of Stargate SG-1's first five seasons show Ra's mask in close-up, which is similar to Tutankhamun's golden mask (pictured).

The first opening title sequence, used in the first five seasons, shows a slow-pan camera move over Ra's mask. The Stargate SG-1 producers had run out of time before the premiere of Season 1 and simply re-used the accelerated opening title sequence of the feature film. Ra's mask had been created in the feature film's model shop and had originally been filmed with a motion-control camera. Partly because Ra's mask looked cross-eyed, Brad Wright approached the art department in the following years to produce a new opening title sequence; however, the sequence remained the same until the show's move to the Sci-Fi Channel. During the first five seasons when the show was syndicated, a separate introduction was used; this intro is still used by Sci-Fi for Seasons 1–5. This version uses action shots of the original cast.

The opening title sequence of the first two Season 6 episodes shows a turning Stargate, for which a Frazier lens was put as close as 1/8 inch (3.2 mm) to the Stargate prop. The opening credits of the following episodes intercut this material with live-action shots of the characters from previous seasons and ended with the SG-1 team stepping through the Stargate. The opening credits stayed the same in the next two seasons except for minor clip and cast changes. The opening credits of Season 9 intercut shots of the Stargate with action sequences similar to the previous opening credits, although the Stargate was visibly computer-generated. The Sci Fi Channel cut the opening credits from sixty to ten seconds in their original broadcast of the first half of Season 9, but reinstated the full opening credits after strongly negative fan reactions. The writers poked fun at this move in SG-1's milestone episode "200" in Season 10, showing a five-second clip instead of the full titles. Beginning with Season 10's "Company of Thieves", the last clip of the opening credits shows Vala Mal Doran almost missing SG-1's trip through the Stargate.

=== Collaboration with the military ===
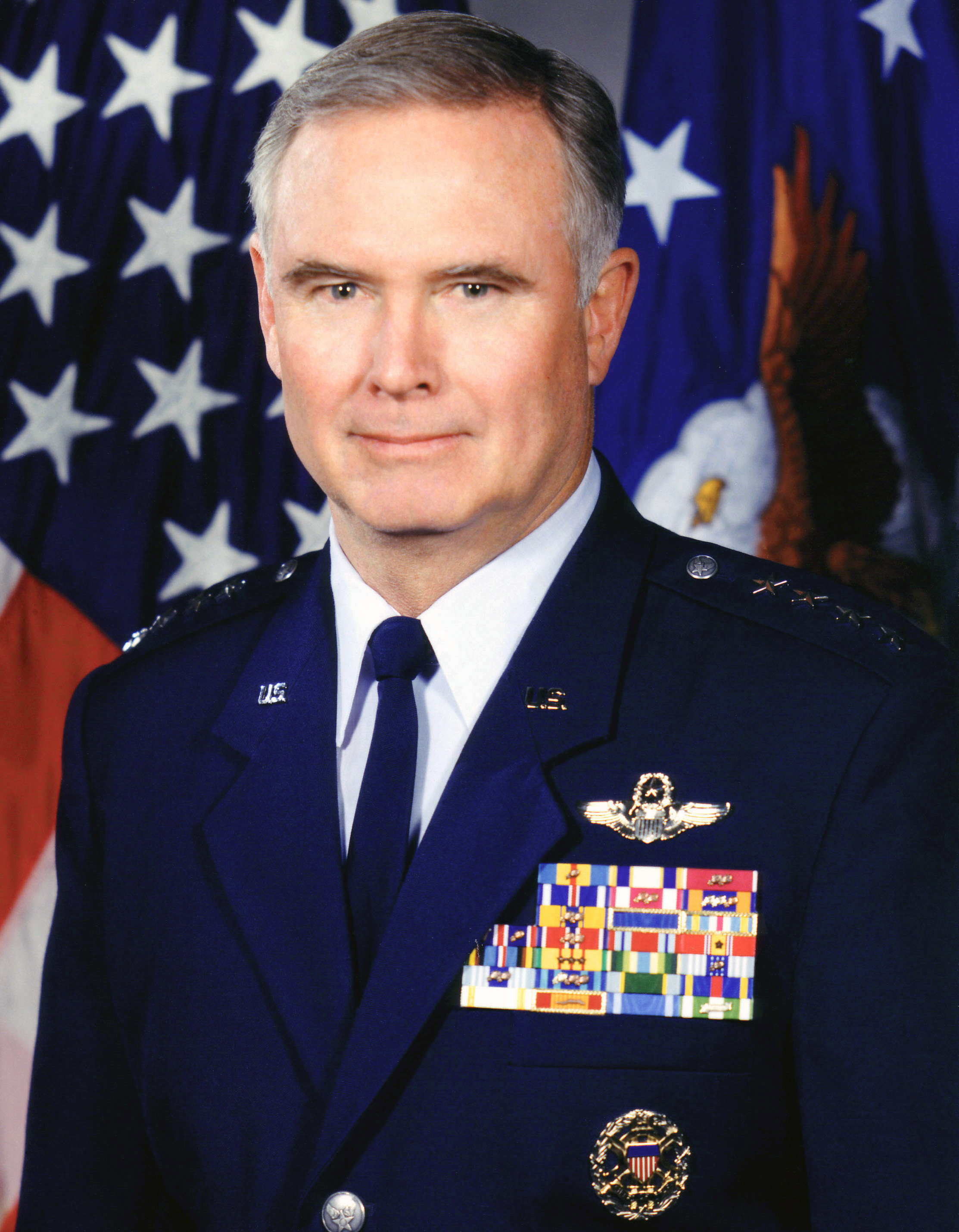
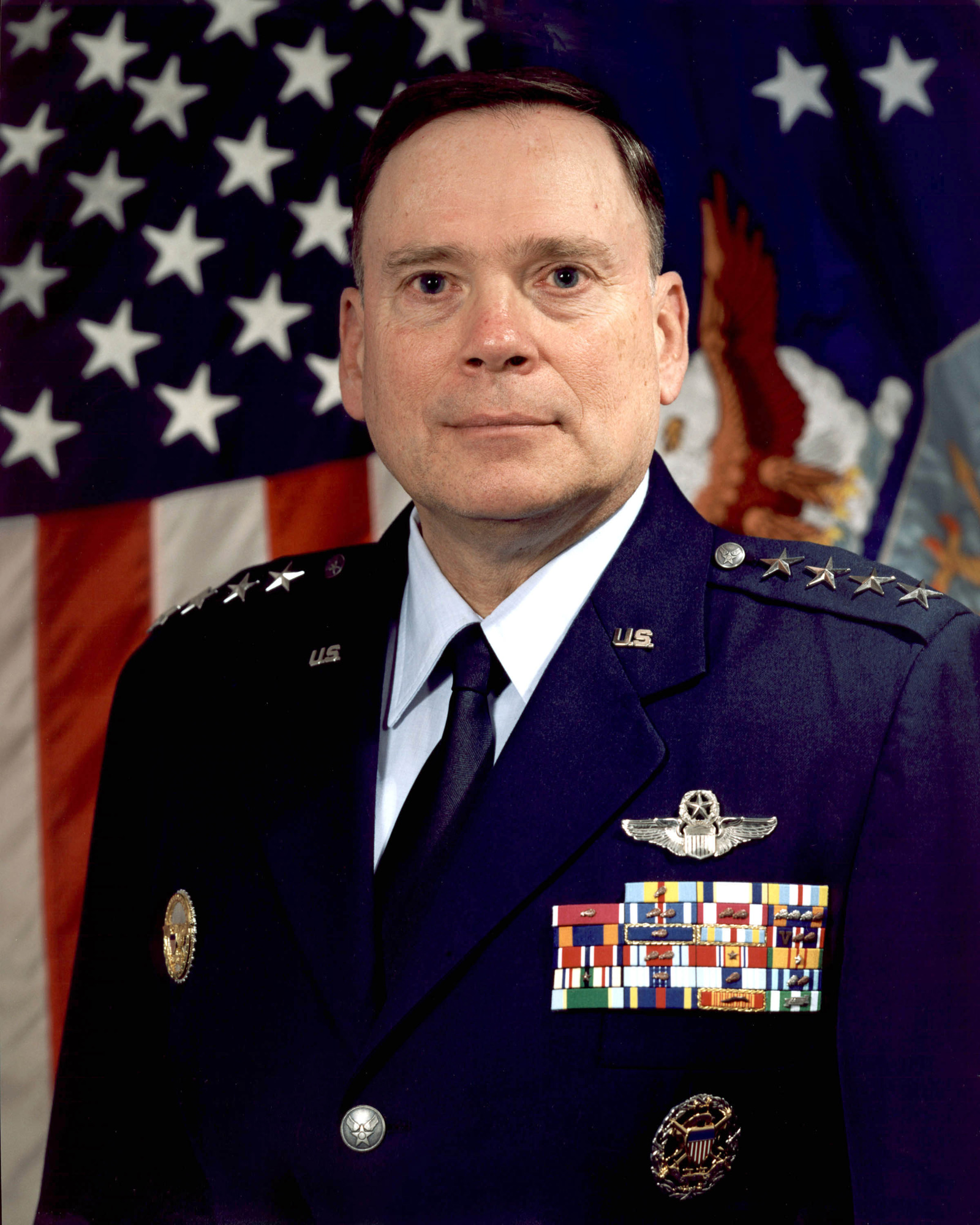
Generals Michael E. Ryan and John P. Jumper, USAF Chiefs of Staff, appeared as themselves in "Prodigy" (2001) and "Lost City" (2004).

The U.S. Department of the Air Force, through the Air Force Office of Public Affairs, Entertainment Liaison in Los Angeles, co-operated closely with the Stargate SG-1 producers. Before the beginning of the series, the Air Force granted production access to the Cheyenne Mountain complex to film stock shots. They also read every script for mistakes and provided help with plausible background stories for all characters, ribbons, uniform regulations, hair advice, plot lines and military relationships and decorum on an active military base. The USAF flew several T-38 Talon, F-15 and F-16 fighter jets up to Vancouver for various episodes and direct-to-DVD films. Many of the extras portraying USAF personnel were real USAF staff.

Two successive Chiefs of Staff of the Air Force, Generals Michael E. Ryan and John P. Jumper, appeared as themselves in Season 4's "Prodigy" and Season 7's "Lost City", respectively. General Jumper's second scheduled appearance in Season 9's "The Fourth Horseman" was cancelled due to ongoing real-world conflicts in the Middle East. The Air Force Association recognized Richard Dean Anderson at its 57th annual dinner on September 14, 2004, for his work as actor and executive producer of the show and for the show's positive depiction of the United States Air Force. General Jumper made Anderson an honorary brigadier general, matching his on-screen promotion to that rank.

Several scenes of Season 4's "Small Victories" were filmed aboard and outside a decommissioned Russian Foxtrot-class submarine, which had been brought from Vladivostok to Vancouver by a private owner. The United States Navy invited the cast and producers to film aboard the nuclear submarine USS Alexandria (SSN-757) and at their Applied Physics Laboratory Ice Station in the Arctic for the direct-to-DVD sequel Stargate: Continuum.

== Themes and allusions ==
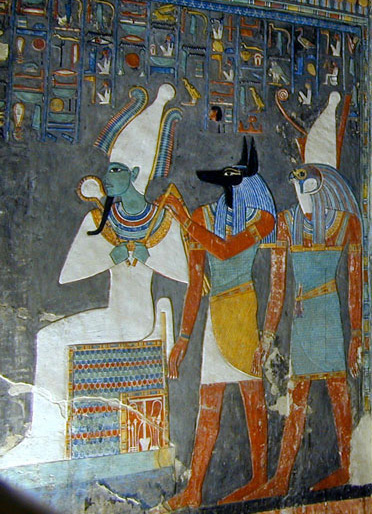
Many SG-1 stories are built around Egyptian gods, such as (from left to right) Osiris, Anubis and Horus.

Stargate SG-1 takes place in a military science fiction environment and employs the common science fiction concepts of strongly differentiated characters fighting an unequivocally evil enemy (the Goa'uld). However, it links alien races with well-known Earth mythologies by use of the central Stargate device. Near-instantaneous interplanetary travel allows quick narrative shifts between the politics on Earth and the realities of fighting an interstellar war. Stargate SG-1 gradually evolves the basic premise of the Stargate film into its own unique mythological superstructure, expanding upon Egyptian mythology (notably the gods Apep/Apophis and Anubis as Goa'uld villains), Norse mythology (notably the god Thor as an Asgard ally) and Arthurian legend (notably Merlin as an Ancient ally against the god-like Ori), among others. SG-1 introduces new alien races (as opposed to alien human civilizations) less often than other science fiction television series and integrates newly encountered races or visited planets in stand-alone episodes into its established mythology while leaving the plotlines accessible for new audience members. Despite the show's extensive intergalactic mythology and science fiction elements, scholar M. Keith Booker considered SG-1 ultimately character-driven and heavily dependent on the camaraderie among the SG-1 members.

The producers embraced humor and wanted SG-1 to be a fun show that did not take itself too seriously. Brad Wright regarded SG-1 as a family show with adequate violence as opposed to random or gratuitous violence. Christopher Judge did not consider SG-1 as a "message show by any stretch of the imagination, but occasionally there are messages there". Aimed at a popular audience, Stargate SG-1 emphasized its present-day-Earth story frame by frequently referring to popular culture, like The X-Files and Buffy the Vampire Slayer had done before. Jonathan Glassner had written The Wizard of Oz references into his own scripts since the first season, which the other writers imitated after Richard Dean Anderson began referring to the film on his own. O'Neill refers to Richard Dean Anderson's favorite television series, The Simpsons, throughout the show. SG-1 makes meta-textual references to the process of writing and filming a science fiction TV series in several episodes and alludes to the main actors' previous TV roles in the pilot episode (Carter: "It took us fifteen years and three supercomputers to MacGyver a system for the gate on Earth") and in a Farscape vignette in the milestone episode "200".

== Broadcast and release ==
=== Showtime and American syndication (1997–2002) ===
The American subscription channel Showtime ordered the first two seasons of Stargate SG-1 with 44 episodes total in 1996. The two-hour pilot episode received Showtime's highest-ever ratings for a series premiere with an audience of approximately 1.5 million households in the 8 p.m. Sunday slot of July 27, 1997. According to the SG-1 producers, a broadcast network would have cancelled SG-1 after a few episodes, but Showtime put no pressure on the show to "deliver the meteoric ratings the way network shows do". The show was consistently the channel's most-watched program (including theatrical movies), so Showtime ordered a third and fourth season of 22 episodes each in July 1998.

Since Stargate SG-1 was expensive to produce, MGM arranged an agreement with Showtime that SG-1 could air in syndication six months after their premiere on Showtime. All 22 FOX owned-and-operated local stations aired the first seasons after their Showtime debut, providing a clearance of 41% of the United States. The show was also available on non-FOX affiliated stations in other markets.

The Sci Fi Channel made its largest single programming acquisition of $150 million in 1998 by buying the exclusive basic cable rights to the MGM package Stargate SG-1, The Outer Limits and Poltergeist: The Legacy. Showtime decided to end its association with Stargate SG-1 at the end of Season 5, saying that the show still had a sizeable viewership but could no longer draw new subscribers due to its availability in syndication.

=== Sci Fi Channel and American syndication (2002–2007) ===
Since SG-1's ratings were good from a financial standpoint, the Sci Fi Channel picked up MGM's offer to continue the show into a sixth season, yet with a slightly reduced budget. Sci Fi aired new episodes of Stargate SG-1 in the 9 p.m. Friday slot between The Dead Zone and Farscape, while it aired older SG-1 episodes in a four-hour block every Monday at 7 p.m. Episodes were broadcast in American syndication six months after their premiere on Sci Fi. The sixth season was supposed to be the show's last, but Sci Fi renewed SG-1 at the last minute. The sixth and seventh seasons made Stargate SG-1 Sci Fi's highest-rated original series with an average of 2 million viewers in over 1.3 million households, elevating Sci Fi into the top 10 cable networks in the United States. For the next few years, the producers believed each current season to be the show's last and repeatedly wrote big series finales, but the success of Stargate SG-1 put off their plans of ending the show to write a new Stargate feature film. Sci Fi cut the length of an SG-1 season from 22 to 20 episodes from Season 8 onwards.

Originally envisioned as a replacement for SG-1, the spin-off series Stargate Atlantis began airing in tandem with SG-1's eighth season in summer 2004, setting a series record of 3.2 million viewers for SG-1 and a Sci Fi record as most-watched episode of a regular series ever (at the time) for Atlantis with 4.2 million viewers. Battlestar Galactica joined the two Stargate series in January 2005, making Sci Fi the leader among basic cablers on Friday nights over the summer of 2005. The producers considered replacing Stargate SG-1 with a new show named Stargate Command after SG-1's eighth season, but the Sci Fi Channel decided to continue SG-1 with a slightly changed cast for a ninth season instead. Season 9's average slipped from 2.4 million viewers in late 2005 to 2.1 million viewers with 1.8 household rating during early 2006, which Sci Fi's Mark Stern attributed to the "tech-savvy, toy-loving, time-shifting audience" whose use of digital video recorders excluded them in ratings compilations. Meanwhile, the decline of SG-1's 2005–2006 syndication household ratings was consistent with the overall decline in syndicated sci-fi action hours. Sci Fi ordered a record-breaking tenth season of SG-1 in 2005, but announced it would not renew the show for an eleventh season in summer 2006 (see Cancellation and future). The final SG-1 episode, "Unending", premiered on Sky1 in the UK on March 13, 2007, and attracted approximately 2.2 million viewers on the Sci Fi Channel on June 22, 2007.

=== International broadcast ===
According to Wright and Cooper, the worldwide popularity of science fiction was a factor in SG-1's success and the good international reception helped keep the series on the air in the beginning. Several newspapers reported in 2005–2006 that Stargate SG-1 aired in over 100 countries with a weekly worldwide viewership of around 10 million, but The New York Times gave different numbers in 2004, saying that the show was broadcast in sixty-four countries with more than 17 million viewers a week. Stargate SG-1 had a particularly fervent response in the United Kingdom, Germany, France and Australia.

Stargate SG-1 aired in the United Kingdom on Sky One with repeats on Sky Two, Sky Mix, Sky Max, Sky Sci-Fi, and Channel 4. Sky One broadcast new episodes of the second half of most seasons before their American premiere. Brad Wright found it "almost embarrassing" that Stargate SG-1 was much more popular in the United Kingdom than in Canada, where the show aired on Space, Citytv, A-Channel, Movie Central and French-language channels TQS and Ztélé. Stargate SG-1 aired in Australia on Sci Fi Australia and Channel Seven. It aired in India on STAR World India and in Israel on Channel 1.

=== Cancellation and future ===
On August 21, 2006, a few days after the premiere of SG-1's milestone episode "200", the Sci Fi Channel confirmed that Stargate SG-1 was not being renewed for an 11th season. While news outlets cited declining ratings, expensive production and lack of promotion as possible reasons for the cancellation, the Sci Fi Channel's Mark Stern merely stated the decision was not ratings-based. Instead, he said the production staff was given enough time to tie up all the loose ends of the story and SG-1 cast members were planned to be incorporated into the renewed Stargate Atlantis. Meanwhile, the SG-1 producers and rights-holder MGM expressed a desire to continue SG-1 as a movie, mini-series, or an eleventh season on another network. Brad Wright confirmed the production of two direct-to-DVD films in October 2006, and Amanda Tapping joined the Atlantis cast for their fourth season. The first film, Stargate: The Ark of Truth, was released in March 2008 and wraps up the Ori storyline. The second film, Stargate: Continuum, is an alternate time-line time travel story and was released in July 2008. A special edition of the two-hour pilot episode "Children of the Gods" with re-edited scenes and a different score has also been produced.

In April 2009, MGM confirmed a third new SG-1 film that Brad Wright had first announced in May 2008. Joseph Mallozzi revealed the working title as Stargate: Revolution. The film was planned to be written by Wright and former Stargate Atlantis executive producer Carl Binder. Martin Wood would serve as director. The premise of the film would have been the "possibility of the Stargate program going public". According to Wright, the film would center on the Jack O'Neill character and would reunite as many of the SG-1 cast as possible, depending on the cost of the film and actor availability. The character of Vala Mal Doran would not appear in the film. Amanda Tapping confirmed her appearance in this SG-1 film and the first Atlantis movie in September 2008, and Michael Shanks (Daniel Jackson) confirmed his and Richard Dean Anderson's participation in January 2009. No contracts had been signed by April 2009, but Wright stated that he "can almost guarantee we are proceeding with the SG-1 movie this year [2009]". Nevertheless, production was put on hold. Wright explained that the late-2000s recession made DVD premieres less lucrative for MGM than in the years before, and he also pointed to the financial crisis of MGM as reason for the delay. Wright and Joe Mallozzi expressed optimism that production would eventually start, until Wright announced in April 2011 that the SG-1 film project was permanently shelved, along with plans for future Atlantis and Stargate Universe films and a cross-over film incorporating elements from all three series. By then, neither the Atlantis nor Universe television series were produced anymore. Still, Wright did not rule out future Stargate films, saying; "It's a franchise. Stargate is not over. Somebody smart from MGM is going to figure it out and something will happen."

=== Home media ===
Stargate SG-1 was first released on DVD in some European nations in volumes of typically four episodes each, beginning with "The Best of Season 1" as Volume 1 in the United Kingdom in 2000. Each following season was released as six individual volumes (except Season 10 with five volumes), beginning with the first four episodes of Season 2. In 2000, the series was first released in the United States on DVD with only three episodes. The following year, Seasons 1–8 were released in five-disc amaray box sets in the United States. MGM Home Entertainment (Europe) began releasing complete season box sets (including Season 1) alongside the individual volumes in 2002. The British season box sets were usually released half a year after a season's last volume release in the UK. Stargate SG-1 was also released in DVD season box sets in Australia.

Most DVDs contain behind-the-scenes features, audio commentaries for nearly all episodes beginning with Season 4 and production galleries. The box sets of the first eight seasons were re-released with slim packaging in all regions, beginning in the United States in summer 2006. A complete series set was first released in the United States in October 2007, containing 50 discs from the ten seasons of Stargate SG-1 and four bonus discs with content not part of the original sets. More than 30 million copies of DVDs had been sold by 2006.

On June 15, 2020, Visual Entertainment re-released the complete series, without the films, on DVD. On December 18, 2020, the company released the entire series, again without the films, on Region A Blu-ray.

=== Online distribution ===
New episodes of Stargate SG-1 were first released on iTunes in the US in August 2006, each time one day after their premiere on the Sci Fi Channel. The commercial-free episodes were priced $1.99 each, while a season pass with twenty episodes cost $37.99. A release on iTunes UK followed in October 2007. All ten seasons of SG-1 were available on iTunes and Amazon Unbox by January 2008. Stargate SG-1 made its debut on hulu.com in March 2009, starting with the first season. At first, viewers in the United States could only watch episodes of the first seasons, but as of December 2009 all episodes of Seasons 1–10 were available free of charge with a small number of commercials on Hulu, through January 31, 2011. Free access to all SG-1 episodes continued until July 31, 2011, when the episodes were finally removed. As of 1 February 2011, all episodes of the entire Stargate franchise were available on Netflix's subscription-based online video streaming service in the US. As of 15 August 2012 Netflix removed Stargate SG-1 from its online video streaming service. As of May 2013, Amazon Video has Stargate SG-1 available for online streaming. As of August 2014 SG-1 is available on Netflix UK. The pilot episode "Children of the Gods" though has been replaced with the 2009 updated final cut with updated CGI and the full-frontal nudity removed. As of July 2015, Hoopla Digital, an online library media database, has all ten seasons of Stargate SG-1 available to watch free without commercials, for those who have cards with a participating library. The first two episodes are the edited versions, in which full frontal nudity has been removed. In September 2017, MGM launched its own online streaming service called Stargate Command, making available all episodes of Stargate SG-1 along with Stargate Atlantis and Stargate Universe. The show returned to Netflix in the United States on December 1, 2020, with a TV-MA rating because of the full frontal nudity in the first episode.

The series currently airs on the Comet digital network.

== Influence ==
=== Critical reception ===
Stargate SG-1, particularly during earlier seasons, did very little to attract much in the way of attention from the mainstream media. The show's July 1997 pilot, "Children of the Gods" received mixed responses from publications such as The New York Times and Variety. While there was only passing interest from mainstream publications, science fiction publications such as Starburst, Cult Times and TV Zone regularly reviewed and featured SG-1. Sharon Eberson of the Pittsburgh Post-Gazette, wrote that "Stargate SG-1's place in the sci-fi universe can be measured in longevity, spot-on cast chemistry, rabid fans who call themselves Gaters and the tough subjects it has tackled", going on to note that the show "had rarely been a critical darling".

Despite the lukewarm reaction to the pilot, various critics and publications later recognized that SG-1 had surpassed the 1994 film on which it was based. Writing for The Guardian in 2009, Emily Wilson labeled the original film "pretty dire", believing that the series had far outshined it. Wilson appreciatively teased SG-1's format of visiting slightly different, English speaking alien worlds, with similar caves and studio-flat floors, writing that "what makes it good are the jokes, the actors, and the great ideas the writers keep throwing out". What Culture believed SG-1 to be the best entry into the Stargate franchise, surpassing both the film and spinoff series, putting it #10 on their 25 Greatest Sci Fi TV Shows of All Time list.

Rolling Stone called the series "one of the unlikeliest success stories in sci-fi TV history", ranking it #36 on their 50 Greatest Sci-Fi Series of All Time list. SyFy Wire described the show as "sci-fi comfort food in the best possible way" comparing the way the show examined morality to that of Star Trek: The Original Series, placing the show 20th on their Greatest Sci-Fi TV Series of the Past 25 Years list. In 2003, after spinoff series Stargate Atlantis was greenlit, SG-1 enjoyed more mainstream exposure. The July issue of TV Guide proclaimed on the front cover "Forget Trek! Stargate SG-1 is now sci-fi's biggest hit!".

In the show's later seasons, it was broadcast on the Sci-Fi Channel on the same night as the 2004 reimagining of Battlestar Galactica. Galactica was critically acclaimed for its dramatic, often dark, take on science fiction television. People called Stargate SG-1 "the anti-Battlestar Galactica", praising it for being accessible, comforting and captivating. According to Melanie McFarland of the Seattle Post-Intelligencer, SG-1's records did not earn it "the kind of wide-ranging respect a successful series with a 200-episode run deserves"; SG-1 rarely occupied a slot on 'best show' lists because the show remained "relegated to the back of the bus in terms of popularity" behind the glory of Galactica, although every week, the show attracted an average of 10 million viewers worldwide. IndieWire lauded the series for its camp, self-aware style, calling this "its saving grace compared to other excellent, but heavy sci-fi series like Battlestar Galactica", ranking the show #18 on their list of the 20 Best TV Shows Based on Movies of all time.

The show has also gone on to be featured on various lists of works considered the best. In 2019, Popular Mechanics ranked Stargate: SG-1 the 14th best science fiction television show ever. Insider included the show in their The 19 Best Sci-fi Shows of All Time. Goliath ranked SG-1 #10 in their 15 Favorite Sci-Fi Shows of All Time. Paste ranked it #24 out of 100 on their 2017 list of Greatest Sci-fi television. ShortList included SG-1 in their 15 Best Sci-Fi TV shows list. In 2011, IGN ranked it #19 in their Top 50 Sci Fi Shows of All Time. Stargate SG-1 ranked #28 on TV Guide's Top Cult Shows Ever. In 2005, SG-1 and Atlantis shared the number four spot in a poll about the "most popular cult TV shows" on the British Cult TV website. SG-1 was also included in the list of "17 All-Time Great Cult TV Shows You Say We Missed" by Entertainment Weekly in 2009. In a Digital Spy user poll, the show ranked as the 4th Greatest Sci-fi show of all time. Amazon Prime also conducted a user-poll in 2019, with the show voted the 3rd Greatest Sci-Fi of all Time.

=== Awards and nominations ===
Stargate SG-1 was nominated for numerous awards during its ten-season run. Its nominations for seven Emmys in the "Outstanding Special Visual Effects for a Series" category and one Emmy for "Outstanding Music Composition for a Series (Dramatic Underscore)" did not result in a win. SG-1 won two Gemini Awards, twelve Leo Awards and five Saturn Awards out of over thirty nominations each. Stargate SG-1 was also nominated for two VES Awards in 2003 and 2005 and for two Hugo Awards in 2005 and 2007.

=== Fandom ===
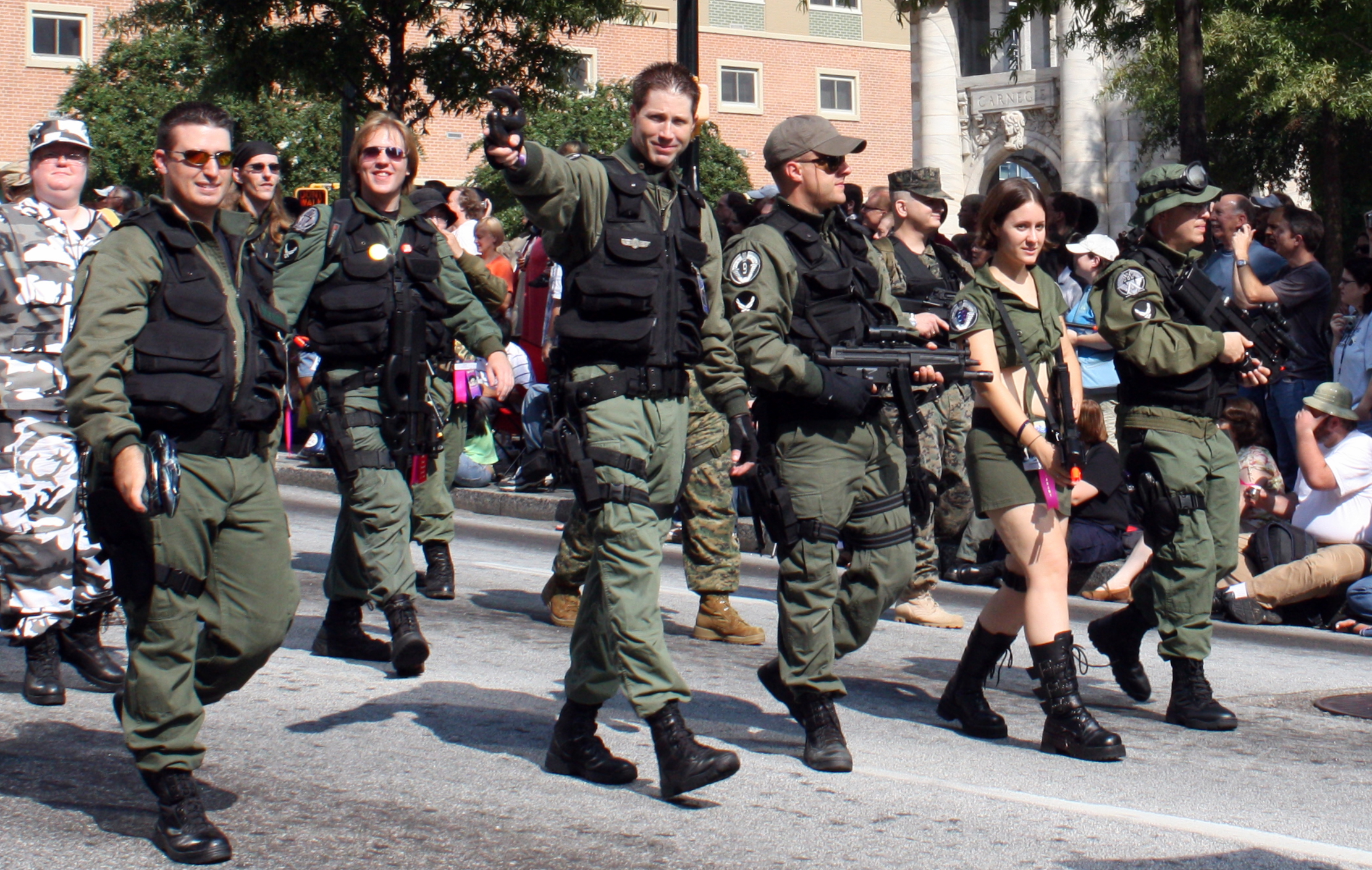
Fans costuming as SG teams at Dragon Con in 2008

Brad Wright used the term "Gaters" to refer to fans of Stargate SG-1 in 2001, but the term did not become widespread. Some fans' belief that there was a real Stargate device under Cheyenne Mountain inspired writers Joseph Mallozzi and Paul Mullie to come up with their own conspiracy story for Season 4's "Point of No Return". The fansite GateWorld became a major franchise news site with special arrangements with MGM; GateWorld's founder Darren Sumner was later hired to serve as a news editor for the official Stargate SG-1 magazine and to check Stargate comic books for continuity errors with the TV shows before publication. Late Night with Conan O'Brien graphic designer Pierre Bernard gained notoriety among Stargate fans for devoting several of his "Recliner of Rage" Late Night segments to SG-1. The producers invited him to make cameo appearances in the episodes "Zero Hour" and "200".

Established in 2000, Gatecon is the world's longest-running SG-1 fan convention. It is held in the Vancouver area, (plus two in the UK), with more actor and crew member participation than other conventions. SG-1 conventions by Creation Entertainment were also marketed as "The Official Stargate SG-1 and Stargate Atlantis Tour", which mostly took place in the United States until Creation Entertainment acquired the license for Vancouver conventions in 2005. Wolf Events organized many SG-1 conventions in Europe, particularly in the UK and Germany.

=== Merchandise ===
Stargate SG-1 spawned an industry of spin-off products. From 1999 to 2001, ROC published four Stargate SG-1 novels written by Ashley McConnell. In 2004, UK-based Fandemonium Press launched a new series of licensed tie-in novels based on Stargate SG-1, although these books were unavailable in North America until 2006 when the license conflict with ROC expired. Titan Publishing publishes the official Stargate Magazine, while Avatar Press published a series of Stargate SG-1 comics. British company Big Finish Productions began to produce Stargate SG-1 audio adventures in early 2008, voiced by members of the SG-1 cast. A Stargate SG-1 roleplaying game and a Stargate trading card game were released in 2003 and 2007. Diamond Select Toys and Hasbro launched a series of toys in 2005 and 2006, respectively. The planned video game Stargate SG-1: The Alliance was cancelled in 2005 and the futures of the MMORPG Stargate Worlds and the Third Person Shooter from the same studio (Cheyenne Mountain Entertainment) named Stargate Resistance were made clear in November 2010 following MGM's decision not to renew CME's Stargate license. Four amusement rides are based on Stargate – the Stargate SG-3000 theme park ride operating at Space Park Bremen in Germany and at Six Flags theme parks in Chicago, San Francisco and Louisville.

=== Legacy ===
We were off the radar for so long. [...] We were like the slowly burning candle. We're not a huge hit by any means. We're a nice little show that does well and makes MGM a lot of money.

— Creator Brad Wright in 2006

Stargate SG-1 spawned the animated Stargate Infinity, and the live-action spin-off TV series' Stargate Atlantis and Stargate Universe. By SG-1's tenth season in 2006, Stargate SG-1 and Stargate Atlantis were said to have brought US$500 million in production to British Columbia. MGM executive vice president Charles Cohen described Stargate SG-1 and its spinoff series as the television counterpart of their James Bond franchise, being very profitable and improving their image.

According to Stan Beeler and Lisa Dickson in their 2005 book Reading Stargate SG-1, the only science fiction shows to exceed the staying power of SG-1 are Doctor Who and the Star Trek franchise, although The X-Files and Buffy/Angel might have comparable longevity. Brad Wright cited continuity in the creative team and fan loyalty as reasons for the show's longevity. With its 202nd episode, "Company of Thieves", Stargate SG-1 surpassed The X-Files as the longest-running North American science fiction series on television, until passed by the final season of Smallville in 2011, which was in turn passed by the eleventh season revival of The X-Files in 2018. Doctor Who fans dispute SG-1's listing in the 2007 Guinness World Records as the "longest-running science fiction show (consecutive)", as 695 episodes of the British show were produced but not shown consecutively between 1963 and 1989. Scott D. Pierce from Deseret News said that the series never made a "sort of cultural impact" as Star Trek because the show was "pretty derivative" which he further stated it became "more so over the years."

Reflecting on SG-1 in 2020, Dean Devlin, co-creator of the 1994 original film, recalled that initially he had been very hostile to the series, likening his experience of it to "watching someone else raising your child" and pointing out that the full-frontal nudity featured in the pilot episode was not what he thought Stargate should be about. But he had come to believe, he said, that the passion of SG-1's fanbase reflected the fact that Brad Wright and Jonathan Glassner had created a really good show, thus reaching out to Glassner for the first time.

== Bibliography ==
- Beeler, Stan (May 2008). "Stargate SG-1 and The Quest For The Perfect Science Fiction Premise". In Telotte, J. P. (ed.). The Essential Science Fiction Television Reader. United States: University Press of Kentucky. p. 370. ISBN 978-0-8131-2492-6. OCLC 229064465. Archived from the original on August 4, 2023.
- Beeler, Stanley W.; Dickson, Lisa, eds. (2006). Reading Stargate SG-1. London: I.B. Tauris. p. 308. ISBN 978-1-84511-183-0.
- Booker, M. Keith (2004). Science Fiction Television. Praeger Publishing. p. 238. ISBN 0-275-98164-9. Archived from the original on August 4, 2023.
- Gibson, Thomasina (2003). Stargate SG-1: The Illustrated Companion Seasons 5 and 6. London: Titan Books. ISBN 978-1-84023-606-4.
- Storm, Jo (December 6, 2005). Approaching the Possible: The World of Stargate SG-1. Toronto, Ontario, Canada: ECW Press. p. 534. ISBN 1-55022-705-X.
