= Stargate =

American science fiction franchise

- Official franchise logo
- Created by: Dean Devlin; Roland Emmerich
- Original work: Stargate (1994)
- Owners: Amazon MGM Studios; StudioCanal (original film only)

Print publications
- Books: List of novels
- Comics: List of comics

Films and television
- Film: Stargate (1994)
- Television series: Stargate SG-1 (1997–2007); Stargate Atlantis (2004–2009); Stargate Universe (2009–2011)
- Web series: Stargate Origins (2018)
- Animated series: Stargate Infinity (2002–2003)
- Direct-to-video: Stargate: The Ark of Truth (2008); Stargate: Continuum (2008)

Games
- Video games: List of video games

Official website
- MGM

Stargate is a military science fiction media franchise owned by Amazon MGM Studios. It is based on the film directed by Roland Emmerich, which he co-wrote with producer Dean Devlin; production company StudioCanal owns the rights to the original film. The franchise is based on the idea of an alien wormhole (specifically an Einstein–Rosen bridge) device (the Stargate) that enables nearly instantaneous travel across the cosmos. The franchise began with the film Stargate, released on October 28, 1994, by Metro-Goldwyn-Mayer and Carolco, which grossed US$197 million worldwide. In 1997, Brad Wright and Jonathan Glassner created a television series titled Stargate SG-1 as a sequel to the film. This show was joined by Stargate Atlantis in 2004, Stargate Universe in 2009, and a prequel web series, Stargate Origins, in 2018. Also consistent with the same story are a variety of books, video games and comic books, as well as the direct-to-DVD movies Stargate: Children of the Gods, Stargate: The Ark of Truth, and Stargate: Continuum, which concluded the first television show after 10 seasons.

In 2011, Stargate Universe, the last Stargate program on television, ended its run. Brad Wright announced that there were no more plans to continue the same story in further productions. In 2016, comic publisher American Mythology acquired the rights to publish new Stargate Atlantis stories set within the established franchise canon. This was expanded in 2017 to include new Stargate Universe comics as well, resolving the cliffhanger that ended the show. The predominant story arc thus ran for more than 15 years, including 18 seasons (364 episodes) of programming, and 22 comic book issues as of January 2020. However, a variety of other media either ignore this main continuity or reset it, while maintaining essential elements that define the franchise (mainly, the inclusion of a Stargate device). These include the 2002 animated series Stargate Infinity.

== Premise ==
An activated Stargate, the central object of the Stargate universe, here depicted in the SG-1 television series.

The Stargate franchise is built around the in-universe titular device of the Stargate, a ring-shaped device built by an ancient intergalactic race of beings that allows almost instantaneous travel across vast distances via wormholes that can be "dialed" between any two Stargates on the network. The shows themselves are typically set contemporaneous to when they were made, featuring real-world or "realistic" technologies in an otherwise science-fiction setting. Most incarnations of the franchise follow a similar structure, following the exploits of the lead expeditionary team of the show's setting on various one-off or season-arc continuing episodes, with major differences being the principal setting and main villains faced.

== Franchise releases ==
Due to multiple developers working separately and independently on the franchise over the years, the various Stargate productions are not entirely consistent with each other; and while no set of works forms an official canon, the largest following exists for the three live-action series.

=== Media releases ===
==== Films ====
Overview of Stargate films
Film	Release date	Director	Box office revenue		
Film	Release date	Director	United States	International	Total
Stargate	October 28, 1994	Roland Emmerich	$71,565,669	$125,000,000	$196,565,669
Stargate: The Ark of Truth	March 11, 2008	Robert C. Cooper	$11,728,654	$20,354,000	$32,082,654
Stargate: Continuum	July 29, 2008	Martin Wood	$9,220,127	$17,872,384	$27,092,511

==== Television ====
Series	Season	Episodes	Originally released			Creators
Series	Season	Episodes	First released	Last released	Network	Creators
Live-action series
Stargate SG-1	1	22	July 27, 1997	March 6, 1998	Showtime	Brad Wright & Jonathan Glassner
Stargate SG-1	2	22	June 26, 1998	February 10, 1999	Showtime	Brad Wright & Jonathan Glassner
Stargate SG-1	3	22	June 25, 1999	March 8, 2000	Showtime	Brad Wright & Jonathan Glassner
Stargate SG-1	4	22	June 30, 2000	February 14, 2001	Showtime	Brad Wright & Jonathan Glassner
Stargate SG-1	5	22	June 29, 2001	February 6, 2002	Showtime	Brad Wright & Jonathan Glassner
Stargate SG-1	6	22	June 7, 2002	February 19, 2003	Sci Fi	Brad Wright & Jonathan Glassner
Stargate SG-1	7	22	June 19, 2003	March 9, 2004	Sci Fi	Brad Wright & Jonathan Glassner
Stargate SG-1	8	20	July 9, 2004	February 22, 2005	Sci Fi	Brad Wright & Jonathan Glassner
Stargate SG-1	9	20	July 15, 2005	March 10, 2006	Sci Fi	Brad Wright & Jonathan Glassner
Stargate SG-1	10	20	July 14, 2006	March 13, 2007	Sci Fi	Brad Wright & Jonathan Glassner
Stargate Atlantis	1	20	July 16, 2004	March 25, 2005	Sci Fi	Brad Wright & Robert C. Cooper
Stargate Atlantis	2	20	July 15, 2005	March 10, 2006	Sci Fi	Brad Wright & Robert C. Cooper
Stargate Atlantis	3	20	July 14, 2006	June 22, 2007	Sci Fi	Brad Wright & Robert C. Cooper
Stargate Atlantis	4	20	September 28, 2007	March 7, 2008	Sci Fi	Brad Wright & Robert C. Cooper
Stargate Atlantis	5	20	July 11, 2008	January 9, 2009	Sci Fi	Brad Wright & Robert C. Cooper
Stargate Universe	1	20	October 2, 2009	June 11, 2010	Syfy	Brad Wright & Robert C. Cooper
Stargate Universe	2	20	September 28, 2010	May 9, 2011	Syfy	Brad Wright & Robert C. Cooper
Animated series
Stargate Infinity	1	26	September 14, 2002	March 24, 2003	Fox (FoxBox)	Eric Lewald & Michael Maliani
Web series
Stargate Origins	1	10	February 15, 2018	March 8, 2018	Stargate Command	Mark Ilvedson & Justin Michael Terry

==== Documentaries and specials ====
Film	First broadcast	Director	Network
Stargate: The Lowdown	June 13, 2003	John Murphy	Sci-Fi
From Stargate to Atlantis: Sci Fi Lowdown	July 5, 2004	John Murphy	Sci-Fi
Sci Fi Lowdown: Behind the Stargate - Secrets Revealed	January 17, 2005	John Murphy	Sci-Fi
Sci Fi Inside: Sci Fi Friday	July 11, 2005		Sci-Fi
Stargate SG-1: True Science	January 3, 2006	Tim Usborne	Sky One
Sci Fi Inside: Stargate SG-1 200th Episode	August 18, 2006	John Murphy	Sci-Fi
10 Years of Stargate SG-1	November 2, 2006		Space
Behind the Mythology of Stargate SG-1	April 13, 2007	Ivon R. Bartok	Sci-Fi

=== Game releases ===
- Stargate: Timekeepers is a live strategy video game which began development in May 2021 and released January 23, 2024 for the PC from Slitherine and CreativeForge Games.
- Stargate SG-1: Unleashed is an adventure game featuring the original SG-1 team for Android and iOS developed by MGM and Arkalis Interactive.
- Stargate: Resistance is an online, third-person shooter. It was released February 10, 2010. It has since been cancelled due to contracts with MGM. It is still downloadable, however.
- Stargate Worlds was a Stargate-universe massively multiplayer online role-playing game in development before its cancellation. The writers and producers of Stargate viewed Stargate Worlds as running side by side with the show in complete canon.
- Stargate SG-1: The Alliance was a computer game based on the Stargate universe, which was due to be released in late 2005, but was canceled.
- A Stargate Trading Card game was released in May 2007. It is available in both Online and Print forms. Designed by Sony Online Entertainment – who also run the Online version of the game – and published by Comic Images.
- A Stargate Role-Playing Game (RPG) was produced by Alderac Entertainment. It was considered canon by both the publishers, and the staff of MGM. However, when Sony bought MGM, they lost the license to produce Stargate RPG products and the RPG license was unassigned.
- In 2021, Wyvern Gaming produced another Stargate SG-1 RPG, built on the Dungeons & Dragons 5e system. Similar to the Alderac-produced game, it and the adventure modules published for it were considered canon, but again a purchase - this time Amazon Studios' purchase of MGM - interrupted or killed the licensing and subsequent development of game expansions.
- Two video games based on the film were published by Acclaim Entertainment: a 1995 eponymous side-scrolling platform game for the Super Nintendo Entertainment System and Sega Genesis, and a Tetris-like puzzle video game for the Game Gear and Game Boy.
- There are three simulator-style amusement park rides named Stargate SG-3000 located at Six Flags Kentucky Kingdom, Six Flags Great America, and Six Flags Marine World.
- A Stargate pinball game was produced by Gottlieb.

== Theatrical films ==
=== Stargate ===
The titular 1994 film Stargate, directed by Roland Emmerich and co-written by Emmerich and Dean Devlin, focuses on the initial "re-discovery" of the Stargate on Earth and the first expedition off-world. The film sees a team led by Colonel Jack O'Neil (Kurt Russell) and including Egyptologist Daniel Jackson (James Spader) venture through the Stargate to the planet of Abydos, finding a society of ancient Egyptian-speaking humans ruled by a space-faring alien (Jaye Davidson) posing in the role of the ancient Egyptian sun god Ra. The expedition eventually liberates the society from the control of the alien, killing it in the process, before the survivors (bar Daniel, who had ingrained himself with the locals) return to Earth.

== Television ==
=== SG-1 ===
The original starring cast of Stargate SG-1.

In 1997, Jonathan Glassner and Brad Wright co-developed Stargate SG-1, a television series intended to continue the story laid down by the original film. Although new actors were cast, several roles from the film were reprised, including the main characters Daniel Jackson and Jack O'Neill (which was re-spelled to include an extra "L"). The setting was transferred from a fictional military facility located in Creek Mountain, to Stargate Command which was based in the Cheyenne Mountain Complex. The show for the first eight seasons initially focused on efforts by Stargate Command to combat the Goa'uld, the race of beings to whom the alien calling itself Ra had belonged to, and their leaders known as the System Lords while liberating both the human populations they had enslaved throughout the galaxy as well as their enslaved armies of mutated humans known as the Jaffa. For the final two seasons the show moved to a new threat, the Ori, which were inspired by Arthurian legend.

The series debuted on Showtime on July 27, 1997, and moved to the Sci-Fi Channel after its fifth season. It starred Richard Dean Anderson (as O'Neill) and Michael Shanks (as Jackson), alongside Amanda Tapping, Christopher Judge and Don S. Davis respectively playing the new characters Samantha Carter, Teal'c and George Hammond. The cast remained fairly regular for most of SG-1's run, but experienced some changes. Michael Shanks left the show at the end of Season 5 and was replaced by Corin Nemec as Jonas Quinn. Shanks returned at the beginning of Season 7 and Nemec was written out. At the end of Season 7 Davis left the show and Anderson filled the gap he left in the story. Season 9 saw the departure of Anderson, but added new regulars Beau Bridges and Ben Browder. After a debut episode in Season 8, followed by appearances in eight episodes of Season 9, Claudia Black's popular reception earned her a position in the regular cast in Season 10.

MGM put an average of $1,400,000 into each episode of the show, and regarded it as one of its most important franchises. SG-1 was taken off air in 2007; however, two direct-to-DVD movies entitled The Ark of Truth and Stargate Continuum were made to tie up loose ends.

==== The Ark of Truth, Continuum and Children of the Gods ====
Stargate: The Ark of Truth is a direct-to-DVD movie written and directed by Robert C. Cooper. The film is the conclusion of Stargate SG-1's Ori arc, and picks up after the SG-1 series finale, but takes place before the fourth season of Stargate Atlantis. The Ark of Truth was released as a Region 1 DVD release on March 11, 2008. Sky One has broadcast the film on March 24, 2008, to be followed by the Region 2 DVD release on April 28, 2008, with the Region 4 DVD release on April 9, 2008.

Stargate: Continuum is a direct-to-DVD movie written by Brad Wright and directed by Martin Wood. Some scenes for this movie were already shot at the end of March 2007, but the original start date was set for May 22 at Vancouver's Bridge Studios. The production budget was $7 million. The movie was released on DVD and Blu-ray Disc on July 29, 2008. The Region 4 DVD was released on August 6, 2008, with the Region 2 DVD released on August 18, 2008; followed by possible TV broadcasts. The film is a time-travel adventure and is the second sequel to Stargate SG-1, after Stargate: The Ark of Truth.

Stargate: Children of the Gods is a direct-to-DVD movie written by Jonathan Glassner and Brad Wright and directed by Mario Azzopardi. The Stargate SG-1 pilot episode was re-cut as a third Stargate SG-1 direct-to-DVD special and released on July 21, 2009, by MGM Home Entertainment in 16:9 widescreen format. A few months before its release, executive producer Brad Wright announced it would be enhanced with brand new visual effects and scenes not previously included in the television version. The beginning was to be slightly altered, a new scene added, and the nudity scene taken out to make this episode suitable for children, with the final movie roughly seven minutes shorter than the original episode.

=== Atlantis ===
Stargate Atlantis was a spin-off television series from Stargate SG-1. A new feature film was originally intended to transition the two series after the sixth season of SG-1. Later, SG-1 was renewed for a seventh season, and the feature film was then planned to transition that season. Finally, when SG-1 was renewed for an eighth season, the intended film instead became the two-part season finale episode "Lost City", and the setting of Stargate Atlantis was moved to the Pegasus galaxy. This allowed the two shows to exist side-by-side within the same fictional universe, and later the two shows even become interconnected. Atlantis was developed by most of the same people and in the same studios as SG-1.

The series follows the adventures of the "Atlantis expedition", an international combination of military forces and civilian scientists who travel to the Pegasus Galaxy in search of the Lost City of Atlantis, built by the ancient race of beings who had built the Stargates. Throughout the five-year run the show mostly focused on the expedition fighting an alien species known as the Wraith, who are required to periodically feed on humans to survive and for thousands of years terrorised the humans of the galaxy, all while preventing their new foes from reaching the Milky Way.

Atlantis debuted on the Sci-Fi Channel on July 16, 2004, starring Joe Flanigan and Torri Higginson in the lead roles, with Rainbow Sun Francks, David Hewlett, and Rachel Luttrell alongside. Hewlett and Higginson's characters had previously appeared in SG-1 (though Higginson inherited the role from actress Jessica Steen). In Atlantis' second season, Paul McGillion and Jason Momoa (replacing Francks) were added as regulars. At the end of the third season, Higginson and McGillion were removed as regulars, both serving recurring roles in the 4th season. Season 4 brought in Amanda Tapping, reprising her role as Samantha Carter from SG-1, and Jewel Staite in a recurring role. Tapping left the show for Season 5 to concentrate on Sanctuary, and was replaced by Robert Picardo, who reprised his role as Richard Woolsey from both SG-1 and Atlantis. However, in late summer 2008, it was announced that SciFi would not renew Atlantis. The final episode aired on January 9, 2009.

=== Universe ===
The main cast of Universe. The series has a much larger main cast than previous Stargate shows.

Stargate Universe is the third live-action Stargate series, and premiered on October 2, 2009. The series was pitched to the Sci Fi Channel in the fall of 2007, just before the writer's strike – which put a hold on the project. "The pitch was received very well," according to Stargate Atlantis co-creator Brad Wright. Sci Fi Channel ordered Universe after announcing the cancellation of Stargate Atlantis. Syfy announced on December 16, 2010, that they would not pick the show up for a third season. The final episode aired May 9, 2011.

The shows focuses on an expedition being stranded several billion light years from Earth on board an Ancient ship called Destiny, which has been traveling through the universe uncrewed for millions of years. The show follows the crew as they struggle to survive on board Destiny with no apparent way home. The show was intended to have a darker tone than its predecessors and delve more into the humanity of the characters and their relationships with each other.

=== Stargate Origins ===
Logo of Stargate Origins

In July 2017, a web series called Stargate Origins was announced at a San Diego Comic-Con Panel celebrating the franchise's 20th anniversary. It focuses on the character of Catherine Langford and is a prequel both to the television continuity and to the original feature film. The shooting began in August 2017 and series premiered online at the Stargate Command website on February 15, 2018.

The cast includes Ellie Gall as the young Catherine Langford, Connor Trinneer as Catherine's father, Professor Paul Langford, Aylam Orian as Dr. Wilhelm Brücke, a high-ranking Nazi officer, Philip Alexander as Captain James Beal, British officer stationed in Egypt, and Shvan Aladdin as Wasif, a native Egyptian and a lieutenant in the British army.

=== Infinity ===
Stargate Infinity is an American-French animated science fiction television series created by Eric Lewald and Michael Maliani as a spin-off from its sister show, Stargate SG-1. The story arc in Infinity is set 30 years into the future and follows Gus Bonner and his team. Bonner's team was created after he was framed for a crime he did not commit. He escaped from Stargate Command (SGC) after the hostile alien race Tlak'kahn attacked the SGC to find the chrysalis. Together with his team he escapes through the Stargate with the chrysalis. From that point forward they go from planet to planet until they find the evidence to clear their names while learning about the unique cultures in the galaxy, so that they can one day return to Earth. The story arc was never resolved because of low viewership ratings and the show was cancelled in 2003.

Stargate Infinity premiered in September 2002 as part of 4Kids Entertainment's FOX BOX Saturday morning line-up on FOX and went off the air in June 2003. Due to its lack of popularity the show is almost completely unrecognized. The series was cancelled before any of its story arcs could be resolved. The show was of low budget, which was constantly noted by the media. DIC Entertainment released a 4-episode DVD on October 7, 2003, in Region 1. MGM Home Entertainment released a five disc season box set on August 13, 2007, in Region 2. Shout! Factory, a company known for releasing cult animated series, acquired the rights to the show and released the entire series to DVD on May 13, 2008, in Region 1. As of 2009, there is yet to come a release of Stargate Infinity package in Region 4, namely Oceania and Latin America.

The writers and producers of Stargate SG-1, Stargate Atlantis and Stargate Universe and the main canon of the Stargate franchise were not involved with Infinity, and neither MGM, the production teams nor the fans of Stargate consider Infinity to be an official part of the Stargate universe. According to Stargate SG-1 co-creator Brad Wright, the animated series should not be considered official Stargate canon. Commenting on it, he stated, "I don't have a problem with it. I'm just not involved."

== Reception ==
Stargate took in $16.7 million on its opening weekend and $196.6 million overall, and received mixed reactions from critics; while it was panned by some critics such as Roger Ebert, several positive reviews counterbalanced this leading to a score of 46% on Rotten Tomatoes. Although the film was originally intended as the first of a trilogy, Emmerich and Devlin ultimately moved on to produce Independence Day, and it was not until 2006 that Devlin showed renewed interest in developing sequels. In the intervening time, copyright-holder MGM succeeded the film with the television series Stargate SG-1 without the input of Emmerich and Devlin.

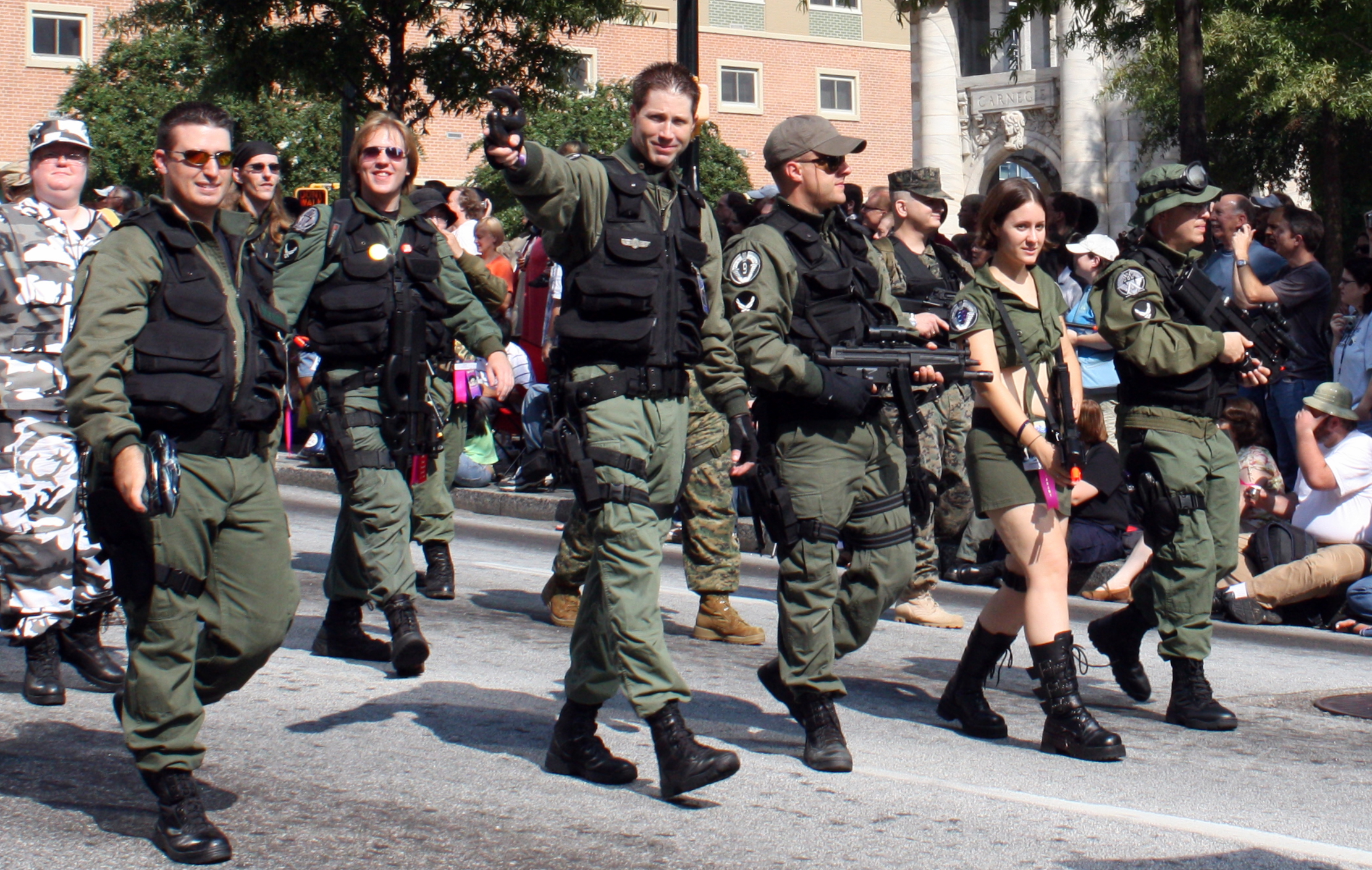
Fans (called "Gaters") posing as SG teams at Dragon Con in 2008

Stargate SG-1 has won the Saturn Award for Best Syndicated Television Series on numerous occasions, and its cast has won similar awards for acting. More recently, it received acclaim for its visual effects, which increased in quality and realism as the show gained a larger budget. On August 21, 2006, the Sci Fi Channel announced that it would not be renewing Stargate SG-1 for an eleventh season after a series of poor performances in the Nielsen ratings. Spokesmen for the production have said all options for the continuation of SG-1 are being considered, including complete digital broadcasting. The Stargate franchise in 2009 won a Constellation Award in the category of Outstanding Canadian Contribution to Science Fiction Film or Television in 2008.

The average viewership to Stargate SG-1 and Atlantis was around ten million a week worldwide. According to Stargate SG-1 and Atlantis co-creator Brad Wright, the show is popular in Great Britain, Germany, France and Australia, but with a steadily declining viewership in homeland Canada. About thirty million Stargate DVDs were sold worldwide by 2006.

The DVD release of Stargate: The Ark of Truth in the US earned MGM/Fox $1.59 million in rentals in the first week after the release, and another $1.38 million in rentals in the second week. In its third week it earned US$1.19 million in rentals totaling $4.16 million. The DVD has also earned $9 million in sales. Stargate: Continuum would go on to gross over $8 million United States dollars in the United States. The film sparked mostly positive reviews with movie critics. A third Stargate SG-1 movie was planned to follow Continuum, but the third movie was put on hold with any other future Stargate movies; the film would have centered around the character of Jack O'Neill.

In 2010 Stargate was estimated to have injected $1 billion into the economy of British Columbia.

== Literature ==
There are three series of novels based on the Stargate franchise, one based on the original Stargate film and two based in the Stargate SG-1 and Stargate Atlantis television shows. A series of books written by Bill McCay, published from 1995 to 1999, were unofficial sequels to the film.

From 1999 to 2001, ROC published four novels based in Stargate SG-1 written by Ashley McConnell. In 2004, UK-based Fandemonium Press started a new series of licensed tie-in novels based on Stargate SG-1. Due to the conflict with ROC's license, these books were available in Australia, Canada, New Zealand, South Africa and the UK, but not in the US. Fandemonium books became available in the US in 2006. The official Stargate Magazine, produced by Titan Publishing, began publishing short stories written by Fandemonium authors in their 8th issue. The stories alternate between SG-1 and Atlantis.

A series of comic books, based on Stargate SG-1 and Stargate Atlantis, began to be published by Avatar Press in 2003. Five have been published to date, with stories by James Anthony and artwork by Jorge Correa. In February 2008, it was announced that Big Finish Productions would release officially licensed audiobooks featuring members of the cast reading new stories. The first two stories, available on CD and digital download, are Gift of the Gods read by Michael Shanks and A Necessary Evil read by Torri Higginson.

== Unrealised films and series ==
=== Stargate (1994) continuity ===
After Bill McCay had written a series of five novels continuing the story the original creators had envisioned, and despite the success of the Stargate television series, in 2006, Dean Devlin said: "He has struck a production deal with MGM and is developing the long-delayed sequel feature films that will pick up the story from the 1994 original." According to Devlin, two movie sequels would have picked up the story from the 1994 original, but not the mythology of the SG-1 and Atlantis series, with the original stars Kurt Russell and James Spader. Devlin regretted giving MGM control over the franchise. The first film already tapped into Egyptian mythology; the second one would have moved into other mythologies; and the third would have then tied all the mythologies together. On July 4, 2011, Dean Devlin spoke out again saying he had not given up on the idea of sequels to his 1994 feature film. He talked about the idea again in a new interview with Collider. Devlin actually wrote it as a trilogy of movies, but was never able to do parts two and three. His hope was, as the series started to wind down, that perhaps it would be time to actually get to do parts two and three:

I think it'll change a little bit from our original idea since so many years have passed. ...We wanted to explore the idea of how the Stargates were built originally, and where else in the universe they exist, and why they exist – and where else they exist on Earth. We had really planned out, as a trilogy of films, to allow this mythology to grow bigger and bigger.

However, Devlin told Empire in November 2016 that the plans to make a reboot of a potential new series were stalled.

=== Brad Wright fourth series pitch ===
In September 2018, it was reported that SG-1, Atlantis and Universe showrunner Brad Wright had been approached by MGM about continuing the franchise. The following year, SG-1 stars Amanda Tapping and Richard Dean Anderson further confirmed that they'd spoken to Wright and expressed their own interest in returning to the franchise in some capacity. In January 2019, Wright elaborated that his conversations with MGM pertained to continuing the television franchise in a way that fully acknowledged prior shows. In July 2020, SG-1, Atlantis and Universe writer-producer Joseph Mallozzi teased Wright's project, commenting that "we've never been closer to a fourth Stargate series." This continued in September 2020, when it was reported that whilst not currently involved in writing, Mallozzi had spoken to Wright about the development, confirming it to be a fourth television series which would continue on from where SG-1, Atlantis and Universe left off and include characters from those shows.

On November 21, 2020, Brad Wright confirmed that he was developing a television series of Stargate with MGM and that it would be a continuation, not a reboot. He also confirmed that whilst things were progressing, the industry shutdown during the coronavirus pandemic was slowing aspects of the development. In a series of podcasts in March and May 2021, Wright continued to offer small updates on the project, including that his script features the SG-1 characters of Daniel Jackson, Cameron Mitchell, Samantha Carter and Jack O'Neill, with the hope that Michael Shanks, Ben Browder and Amanda Tapping all return in some capacity to their respective roles. Wright also expressed that if the series does go ahead, he would want Tapping to direct, with it being clarified by Tapping that the series was not in active production, but still being worked on by Wright. In March 2022, Amazon completed a purchase of MGM, its library, and assets, including Stargate. Around that time, writer and producer on Stargate SG-1, Atlantis, and Universe Joseph Mallozzi teased Wright's pilot script for the new project on social media. However, in November 2022, Wright announced that his revival project was likely dead following Amazon's purchase.

=== Stargate series from Martin Gero ===
A Stargate series was announced by Amazon MGM Studios in November 2025. The show was to be led by showrunner Martin Gero, a franchise veteran who wrote for all three prior live-action series. It was also announced that Brad Wright, co-creator of the prior series, and Joseph Mallozzi, long-time executive producer on the franchise, would also be returning in contributing producer roles while Dean Devlin and Roland Emmerich, who created the 1994 film, were executive producers. Additionally, Joby Harold and Tory Tunnell for Safehouse Pictures were also announced as executive producers.

In June 2026, Variety reported that Amazon was no longer moving forward with the project, reportedly due to concerns it wouldn't reach beyond fans of the existing shows. Further reporting by Deadline suggested it was the result of leadership changes at Amazon, namely the appointment of Blair Fetter as the Head of World-building, coupled with the departure of King in January, then Pepper in April, both of whom had championed the project. Stargate SG-1 actor Michael Shanks was reportedly attached to the project and would have reprised his character Daniel Jackson.

Over the following days, fans began to organise campaigns petitioning Amazon MGM to reverse their decision and reinstate Gero. Actors from the previous series, including Michael Shanks, Rachel Luttrell & Robert Patrick all showed their support on social media for saving the series. After launching the campaign, fans protested outside Amazon MGM Studios headquarters at Culver Studios, having a plane fly overhead towing a banner "#SaveStargate Fans Want Gero Back". Fans then held further demonstrations in Times Square, New York City and rallied to pay for two "Save Stargate" billboard adverts to be shown.
