= Stargate literature =

Written works about or based on Stargate

- Cover of the novel Stargate Atlantis: Reliquary by Martha Wells
- Author: Various authors
- Series: Stargate franchise
- Subject: Main characters
- Publication place: United States

Stargate literature comprises the novels and short stories in the Stargate franchise fictional universe (based on either the original Stargate film or the Stargate SG-1, Stargate Atlantis and Stargate Universe television shows) as well as a non-fiction devoted to the franchise. Stargate literary works follow no strict continuity with the series or each other and are often considered to be non-canon. There is a period of roughly a year between the original idea for a novel and the finalized product, causing problems for authors as they are unaware as to how the franchise will develop and change during the writing process. Despite this, the editors of Stargate literature function as the medium between the author and the production company.

MGM does approve each stage of novel's production, from initial outline to final draft.

Stargate literature centers on the premise of a "Stargate", a ring-shaped alien device that creates a wormhole enabling personal teleportation to complementary devices located cosmic distances away. Under the control of the United States government, the Stargate discovered on Earth is kept a secret from the public. This allows storylines to present no contradiction between depicted events and reality, an effect compounded by setting Stargate in the present day, and depicting Earth accurately, with any unrealistic technology originating solely from alien civilizations. Most of the time, Stargate literature follows SG-1 and the Atlantis flagship team on their journeys through different galaxies.

== Film novelizations ==
Cover of Stargate: Rebellion, the first of Bill McCay's novel sequels to the original Stargate film.

Written by the movie creators, Dean Devlin and Roland Emmerich, the novelization of the original film, Stargate was published by Signet Books, an imprint of Penguin Books, in December 1994. Bill McCay had written a series of five novels continuing the story the original creators had envisioned, despite the success of the Stargate television series. McCay used the official notes by Emmerich to write his books.

A series of five novels written by Bill McCay were published from 1996 to 1999, based on the story of the 1994 film, Stargate. Each book was also produced as a book on tape read by David Fox. These were produced by consulting the original notes made by film director Roland Emmerich, in an attempt to envision where the film "would have gone". Neither party has commented on whether McCay's interpretation was correct. The film's producer, Dean Devlin, had his own ideas, but he did not bring them to light until interviewed much later, after the publication of all the novels. The subsequent television series Stargate SG-1 was an entirely independent development, making no attempt to reconcile with the plot line of the books. This marked the first major branching of the franchise.

The story continues immediately after the events of the film, with the United States armed forces interested in the mineral that is mined for Ra by the Abydans. As conflict arises in many forms on the planet of Abydos, a new threat comes when other gods from Ra's pantheon (namely Hathor) come looking. Bits of the Ancient Egyptian myth, The Destruction of Mankind, are acknowledged in the novel's construction.

The first three books form one complete storyline:

- Stargate: Rebellion (October 1995)
- Stargate: Retaliation (September 1996)
- Stargate: Retribution (October 1997)

The last two continue after the events in the first three books, but move the story forwards by dealing with the Abydans and the events that happen at the climax of the trilogy.

- Stargate: Reconnaissance (May 1998)
- Stargate: Resistance (October 1999)

The book canon of the franchise has multiple differences with the television series Stargate SG-1. In the books, Ra is the last of his race, and all of his lieutenants (such as Hathor and Ptah) are actually loyal humans who pose as the other Egyptian gods created by Ra to enslave the populace. The movie version of Ra inhabits a human body by possessing the human with his soul, rather than as the parasitic snake as seen in Stargate SG-1.

The books focus more on politics, with budget issues and human rights considerations playing a large role. The book's version of O'Neil is much more of a straight soldier, while Jackson remains the idealistic maverick scientist. The quartz-like mineral (called Naqahdah in Stargate SG-1) remains unnamed. The city that Kasuf and Sha'uri live in is called Nagada and more cities on Abydos are shown. While the first three books focus on the plight of the Abydan (called Abydonian in Stargate SG-1) people and the war between Ra's humans and the humans from Earth, the last two books introduce other worlds and other races.

== Other releases ==
ROC published four Stargate SG-1 novels written by Ashley McConnell from 1998 to 2001. These novels were available only in the United States. The United Kingdom-based publisher Fandemonium specialises in Stargate SG-1 and Stargate Atlantis, publishing the first book in 2005. The Stargate SG-1 novels were originally only available in the UK, Australia, New Zealand and South Africa because the company did not hold a licence to distribute them in North America but the Stargate Atlantis books are available worldwide. The company's license was later extended to North America in June 2006. All books are written as canon; that is, they try to recreate the show. MGM reads and approves all the novels.

The company held an open submissions policy in November 2004, inviting fans to submit proposals for a Stargate SG-1 novel. Fandemonium's company runner and chief editor, Sally Malcolm, started out as a fanfic writer herself. Several future books are works of authors found through this policy. Stargate Atlantis novels continue to be written only by professional authors.

The official Stargate Magazine, produced by Titan Publishing, began publishing short stories written by Fandemonium authors in their 8th issue. The stories alternate between both SG-1 and Atlantis. The magazine is available in the UK and internationally through Diamond Comic Distributors' Previews catalogue. Thomasina Gibson and Sharon Gosling have written official companion guides for all seasons of Stargate SG-1 (seasons 1 through 8 as two seasons per companion guide) and Stargate Atlantis, published by Titan Books.

Stepping Through the Stargate: Science, Archaeology, and the Military of Stargate SG-1 is a collection of works which are centered around the science fiction TV series Stargate SG-1. The book takes a thoughtful, but shallow look at the popular, award-winning television series. It was edited by P. N. Elrod and Roxanne L. Conrad and published by BenBella Books in 2004. The book is a non-fiction collection of essays, articles, and personal recollections by cast and crew members, scientists, military experts, and various science fiction writers, all of whom are fans of the show. James Tichenor special effects head of Stargate SG-1 and actor Tom McBeath (who played Colonel Harry Maybourne) and Stargate comic book writer James Kuhoric. Even an Air Force Colonel were some of many who helped to write the collection of works.

Stargate comics are a series of comic books based on the film, Stargate (1994), and the TV series' Stargate SG-1 and Stargate Atlantis. The initial comics were tie-ins with the 1994 film and the later output by Avatar Press has been based on the two TV series. A series of Stargate film-related comics were published by the independent publishing house Entity Comics between 1996 and 1997, under the creative direction of John Migliore and Bill Maus. Along with a four-part comic book adaptation of the Stargate motion picture and three-part adaption of Bill McCay's Stargate: Rebellion, Entity Comics also wrote their own continuation of the Stargate film. Stargate: One Nation Under Ra and Stargate: Underworld were later published as a trade paperback titled Stargate: The New Adventures Collection. There has been no official word as to whether or not the comics are canon.

Stargate audiobooks by Big Finish Productions, based on the long-running military science fiction television franchise Stargate. The "talking books" are each narrated by one of main Stargate characters and feature a second, guest-star voice along with music and sound effects.

=== Development ===
Authors interested in writing a Stargate book need to send a manuscript to the e-mail address of the official Stargate literature webpage. Known writers need to send their publishing history and a short synopsis of their planned plot behind the book.

German author Sabine C. Bauer wrote the first Stargate SG-1 novel, entitled Stargate SG-1 Trial By Fire. Bauer first noted the Stargate universe when studying theater in the United States, when she traveled back to Great Britain, Stargate SG-1 hadn't premiered yet. So she started to write a Stargate script (which eventually became Trial By Fire). She spent four years writing the book writing a main story arc for the character Jack O'Neill. She garnered a few minor awards for her novel and started writing Stargate novels behind the science idea of quantum physics.

Jamie Duncan and Holly Scott have written two Stargate novels, the first being Stargate SG-1 Siren Song and second being Stargate SG-1 Hydra. Scott has commented on the writing process for the books, saying that she and Duncan both learned "Several things from [...] process" when writing the first book, she felt the most important thing she learnt was "Not to be afraid of revising the draft". She further commented that this became "Very handy" when developing their second book (Hydra), since the first draft of the book needed a lot of work, as she said "We had to learn to whack scenes that just didn't work."

Siren Song is set after the event of Stargate SG-1 episode, "Deadman Switch", while Hydra is set between "Tin Man" and "Shades of Grey". According to Duncan, "Deadman Switch" was a "Relatively stand-alone episode" for the series, which made it possible to make an exciting story and a "Fun secondary character" (Aris Boch) for the book. She further stated that she was able to explore the culture better with the book. Scott called the development of Siren Song a "wonderful challenge". As Scott explained, she has wanted to write stories for many of the Stargate SG-1 characters, but Aris Boch was at the top of her list, she called her experience in writing the book "Remarkable" to create a back story for the character and write new interaction between the character and SG-1.

Hydra followed the events of "Tin Man", and as Duncan puts it, the episode came with an "unanswered question", a "paradox" even. The main focus of the story was how to live with yourself when you knew that you were not the person you felt you were. The story follows the cloned SG-1 team being ripped off from all their "Heroic qualities" and what the differences are between them and the real team. The novel itself is told in multiples of view points, and it jumps back and forth in time. When writing the structure for the novel, they created a chart. As Duncan puts it, the story could not be "Told in a linear fashion", if they wanted to achieve certain story effects within the plot. So they felt that if the story was going to achieve an "Emotional" status, it needed to be told in a "Non-linear structure". Scott further stated that some of the "Perspective" of the SG-1 members could not be told because of being too "POV" for the book itself.

Steven Savile, writer of the Shadow series which consists of the books Shadows, Shapeshifter and Trickster were released in 2009. These books were written to stand to true to the nature of Stargate SG-1 and its characters. After writing five about vampires in three years Savile was looking for a new topic to write about without "Repeating" himself. He then learned that Stargate writer Sally Malcolm was looking for new writers for the franchise. After a few E-mails with Malcolm he got the job as a Stargate writer. When commenting on how to make a good tie-in novel for the franchise, he said it was "Tricky on a page-by-page level". He further stated that he couldn't create new stories because by the end of the day the Stargate franchise belonged to Metro-Goldwyn-Mayer (MGM).

=== Reception ===
The book Stargate Atlantis Exogenesis was nominated in the category "Best speculative fiction novel" in the Scribe awards written by Sonny Whitelaw and Elizabeth Christensen, but did not win the award. Author Elizabeth Christensen won the Scribe award in the category "Best Speculative Original novel" at ComicCon 2008 for her book Stargate Atlantis Casualties of War. The award was organized and presented by the International Association of Media Tie-In Writers (IAMTW) which was founded by Max Allan Collins and Lee Goldberg.

== Related pages ==
- List of Stargate literature
- List of Stargate comics
- List of Stargate audiobooks
