= Elizabeth Christensen =

American novelist

- Born: 1978 (age 47–48)
- Education: University of Michigan
- Occupation: Novelist

Elizabeth Christensen (born 1978) is an American writer and author of novels based on the Stargate Atlantis television series, often collaborating with Sonny Whitelaw (See also Stargate literature). A fan of aviation, she holds degrees in aerospace engineering from the University of Michigan as well as being a certificated private pilot.

== Publications ==
Novels

- Stargate Atlantis: The Chosen, April 2006, co-authored with Sonny Whitelaw
- Stargate Atlantis: Exogenesis, December 2006, co-authored with Sonny Whitelaw
- Stargate Atlantis: Casualties of War, Fall 2007 - Winner of the Scribe Award for Best Original Speculative Novel in 2008.
- Stargate Atlantis: Blood Ties, Winter 2007, co-authored with Sonny Whitelaw

Short stories

- Course Corrections, a short story published in Stargate:The Official Magazine, issue #15.
