= List of Stargate comics =

Stargate comics are a series of comic books based on the science-fiction franchise Stargate.

Unlike many other large science fiction universes like Star Trek the Stargate comic license has always been held by independent comic production companies. The initial film based comics were by Entity Comics from 1996 to 1997. in 2003 the comics license was obtained by Avatar Press who published stories based on the first two TV series (Stargate SG-1 and Stargate Atlantis) until 2007, then the license was briefly held by Dynamite Entertainment who made two mini series based on Stargate SG-1 in 2010. Finally the license was held by American Mythology Productions who produced comics based on Stargate Atlantis and Stargate Universe from 2016 to 2019. No new comics have been produced or announced since.

== Entity Comics ==
A series of Stargate film-related comics were published by the independent publishing house Entity Comics between 1996 and 1997, under the creative direction of John Migliore and Bill Maus. this included a four-part comic book adaptation of the Stargate motion picture and three-part adaption of Bill McCay's book StarGate: Rebellion.

Entity Comics Stargate Releases
Title	Date	Issues	Collected editions	Color
Stargate	July 1996 - October 1996	4		Full Color
Doomsday World	November 1996 - January 1997	3		Full Color
One Nation Under Ra	April 1997	1	Stargate: The New Adventures Collection	Black and white
Rebellion	April 1997 - June 1997	3		Black and white
Underworld	May 1997	1	Stargate: The New Adventures Collection	Black and white

== Avatar Press ==
between 2003 and 2007 Avatar Press held the license to produce comics based on the (at the time) two Stargate TV shows (Stargate SG-1 and Stargate Atlantis) these consisted mostly of one shots with a few 3 part miniseries.

All series, including preview and special issues, feature several different, alternate limited edition covers for each issue. These usually include painted covers (featuring artists like Lucio Rubira and Ryan Drake), photo covers, wraparound covers, gold, platinum or blue foil covers, leather covers, and glow-in-the-dark covers. Preview and special issues also get special covers usually available only at comic conventions alongside the Convention Special comics.

Avatar Press Stargate SG-1 Comics
Title	Date	Issues	Collected editions
2003 Convention Special	August 2003	1	Trade paperback and hardcover.
POW	February–April 2004	3	Trade paperback and hardcover.
2004 Convention Special	May 2004	1	Trade paperback and hardcover.
Fall of Rome Prequel	July 2004	1	
Fall of Rome	July–December 2004	3	
Aris Boch	November 2004	1	
Daniel's Song	February 2005	1	
2006 Convention Special	2006	1	
Ra Reborn Prequel	March 2006	1	
2007 Convention Special	July 2007	1	

Avatar Press Stargate Atlantis comics
Title	Date	Issues
Wraithfall	July 2006–February 2007	3

== Dynamite Entertainment ==
Dynamite Entertainment announced in 2009 that they had acquired the license for comic books based on the Stargate television franchise. They published two Stargate miniseries. These series has the distinction of being the only Stargate SG-1 comic series to leave off the "SG-1" title and are simply titled "Stargate."

Dynamite Entertainment Stargate comics
Title	Date	Issues	Collected editions
Vala Mal Doran	May–November 2010	5	Trade paperback
Daniel Jackson	July–November 2010	4	Trade paperback

== American Mythology Productions ==
In 2016, American Mythology Productions launched the first Stargate Atlantis comic since 2007 and the first comic in six years. Their line up originally intended to feature stories based on Stargate Atlantis and Stargate SG-1. However this would not come to pass, with the company producing comics based on Stargate Atlantis and Stargate Universe. The Stargate Universe comics were a continuation of the series however the original creators and writers were not involved.

American Mythology Productions Stargate comics
Title	Date	Issues	Collected editions
Back to Pegasus	May–August 2016	3	Stargate Atlantis: Volume 1
Gateways	November 2016–March 2017	3	Stargate Atlantis: Volume 1
Hearts & Minds	May–November 2017	3	Stargate Atlantis: Volume 2
Singularity	March–October 2018	3	Stargate Atlantis: Volume 2
Stargate Universe: Back to Destiny	June 2017–September 2018	6	

Following the success of the comic releases up to 2018, American Mythology Productions produced an annual that would feature comic stories from both Stargate Atlantis and Stargate Universe with the plan that this would be a yearly release however it would be changed into a ongoing series (the first ongoing comic series in the franchise) however this would only last three issues beyond the initial annual.

American Mythology Productions Stargate Atlantis / Universe Anthologies
Title	Date	Issues
Stargate Atlantis / Universe Anthology annual	February 2018	1
Stargate Atlantis / Universe Anthology (ongoing)	December 2018–January 2019	3

Since the end of stargate comics from American Mythology Productions there have been no new comics produced based on the stargate franchise.
