= Richard Dinnick =

British screenwriter (born 1968)

- Occupations: Screenwriter, novelist, comic book writer, audio playwright
- Known for: Thunderbirds Are Go!

Richard Dinnick (born 22 January 1968) is a British screenwriter, novelist, comic book writer, narrative games narrative designer, audio playwright. He is a frequent guest at writing events (including the London Screenwriters' Festival) and such Doctor Who conventions as Gallifrey One as well as San Diego Comic-Con.

Dinnick is a member of BAFTA, the Writers Guild of Great Britain and the Royal Television Society and a Patron of the Children's Media Foundation.

== Journalism ==
Dinnick started his writing career on the local newspaper Esher News and Mail in 1986. He then specialised in business journalism, working on publications such as Director (the magazine published by the Institute of Directors) and Real Business as part of their editorial teams.

In the late 1990s, he moved to Internet Magazine. During this time he appeared on numerous TV and radio programmes as well as newspapers and industry web sites talking about internet-related matters. He was also shortlisted for the PPA's PTC New Journalist of the Year Award in 1999.

Later he went on to work on the City desk of the Sunday Express and chaired the Government Committee on Web Design Best Practice in 2002/3.

== TV writing career ==
Dinnick is the winner of the 2012 BBC Writersroom opportunity to create a new show and to write for TV on the BBC and went on to write for the CBeebies TV shows Tree Fu Tom and Go Jetters (for which he won a British Screenwriters' Award).

He has worked on developing shows for many companies including NBC and Mind Candy's shelvedMoshi Monsters TV show. He was one of six finalists in a 2014 BBC Academy opportunity to workshop a script for Waterloo Road. In 2015 Dinnick became Head Writer on the new Disney TV show Eena Meena Deeka and in-development action adventure show Captain Extraordinary. He also served as a BAFTA Judge for Children’s Drama in 2013, and Children’s Pre-School Animation in 2019. In between he produced a session for the 2014 Children's Media Conference.

He wrote on the third series of Thunderbirds Are Go! for ITV/Amazon Studios and is developing several ideas for TV. These include the fantasy drama Never After, primetime crime drama Murder of Crows, workplace drama No Kidding, and The Last Horseman, an urban fantasy series. He is working on a web series for Capital City Entertainment, Light & Shadows (a.k.a.Dead Good). He also has a prime time TV crime drama in development with Chrysalis Vision, named "Surface Tension".

Latterly he has been both a Narrative Designer for the AAA Microsoft XBox Games Studios' Sea of Thieves and was BAFTA nominated in January 2025 as part of the Best Evolving Games category. Under the nom de plume, Tom Quiller, he has also been authoring several series of thrillers: espionage titles feature Sam Tilson, and the Amazon bestselling Frida Skardet series of Nordic Noir crime procedurals.

== Doctor Who ==
Dinnick has written prose, scripts and comics for the BBC's Doctor Who, starting with a short story in the Short Trips series from Big Finish. He went on to write "The Underwater War" for Doctor Who: Alien Adventures, published by BBC Children's Books in 2010. BBC Books published his tie-in collection Doctor Who Myths & Legends in June 2017 and he contributed to the Missy themed anthology - also from BBC Books - entitled 'The Missy Chronicles' published in 2018. He has also written Doctor Who comics for IDW and BBC Magazines. He was appointed the lead writer on Titan Comics' Twelfth Doctor line of comics as well as the San Diego Comic Con exclusive, "The Last Action Figure" and a story for the Seventh Doctor collection with art supplied by Jessica Martin. He has written eight mini-books for the Doctor Who series from Running Press and served as Narrative Designer on a VR Game for the show in 2020.

== Graphic novel ==
An original graphic novel - Rob - was published in 2019 by Legendary Entertainment and WEBTOON alongside titles by Jessica Chobot and John Barrowman.

== Television ==
- Surface Tension (working title) - Chrysalis Vision (in development)
- Thunderbirds Are Go - Staff Writer - ITV Studios/Weta Workshop/Amazon Studios
- Eena Meena Deeka, Series 1 + 2 - Lead Writer - Maya/Cosmos/Disney
- Tree Fu Tom, Series 5, 6, 7 - Staff Writer - BBC/Freemantle
- Majid - Series 1 - Staff Writer - Majid Kids TV/Mondo TV
- Karamella - Series 1 - Staff Writer - Majid Kids TV/Mondo TV
- Go Jetters, Series 1 - BBC/Worldwide
- Moshi Monsters TV Show, Series 1 - Mind Candy
- Captain Extraordinary, Series 1 - Head Writer - Rushfirth Creative ( In Development)
- Development Script, not-for-air pilot - BBC In House
- Development Script, broadcaster-owned IP for TV series - BBC
- Development Scripts, production company-owned IP for TV series - Maya/Cosmos

== Audio scripts ==
He has written scripts for several different franchises, largely for Big Finish Productions:

- Stargate: Duplicity (2012)
- Doctor Who - The Rings of Ikiria (2012)
- Doctor Who - The Wanderer (2012)
- Sherlock Holmes - The Tangled Skein (adaptation) (2012)
- Sherlock Holmes - The Hound of the Baskervilles (adaptation) (2011)
- Doctor Who - Recorded Time and Other Stories#Paradoxicide - "Paradoxicide" (2011)
- Doctor Who - Short Trips - Volume 4: "A Star is Born" (2011)
- Bernice Summerfield: Dead Man's Switch (with John Dorney) (2010)
- Sapphire & Steel: The Surest Poison (2005)
- Space: 1889: The Lunar Inheritance (with Andy Frankham-Allen) (2005)

== Prose ==
- Lethbridge Stewart: Lineage (Candy Jar Books, 2018)
- Doctor Who: Myths and Legends (BBC/Penguin Random House, 2017)
- Doctor Who: Underwater War (BBC/Penguin Random House, 2016)
- Moshi Monsters: Super Moshi Missions (Mind Candy/Sunbird, 2012) (tie-in to Moshi Monsters)
- Doctor Who: Alien Adventures' (BBC/Penguin, 2011) The Underwater War, included in an anthology of two stories.

== Short stories ==
Dinnick's first fiction was the short story "Neptune" for Big Finish Productions' Doctor Who anthology Short Trips: Solar System. His published short stories are:

- Short Trips: The Solar System — "Neptune" (Big Finish, 2005)
- Bernice Summerfield: Present Danger — "Past Caring" (Big Finish, 2010)
- "Braking Point" for Stargate Magazine (Titan, 2010)
- Encounters of Sherlock Holmes — "The Adventure of the Swaddled Railwayman" (Titan, 2012)
- Twisted Histories — "Flaming Sword" (Snow Books, 2013)
- Doctor Who: The Missy Chronicles — "Alit in Underland" (BBC/Penguin Random House, 2018)
- "Sabre Truth" for Star Wars Insider (Titan, 2022)

== Comics ==
- Lost in Space - Countdown to Danger - volume #1: "Secrets" (Legendary Entertainment, December 2018 )
- Lost in Space - Countdown to Danger - volumes #2: "Quality Time" (Legendary Entertainment, May 2019)
- Lost in Space - Countdown to Danger - volumes #3: TBA (Legendary Entertainment, July 2019)
- "Doctor Who: The 13th Doctor" - Volume #0 (Titan Comics, September 2018) - The Many Lives of Doctor Who
- "Rob" - issues #1 - #6 (Legendary Entertainment/WEBTOON - TBA) - TBA
- "Doctor Who: The 12th Doctor" - issue #3.10 - #3.13 (Titan Comics, December 2017 - February 2018) - A Confusion of Angels
- "Doctor Who: The 12th Doctor" - issue #3.9 (Titan Comics, November 2017) - The Great Shopping Bill
- "Doctor Who: The 12th Doctor" - San Diego Comic-Con Exclusive (Titan Comics, July 2017) - The Last Action Figure
- "Doctor Who: The 12th Doctor" - issues #3.5 - #3.8 (Titan Comics, July - September 2017) - The Wolves of Winter featuring the first run for new series companion Bill, and the Ice Warriors.
- Doctor Who Special 2012 - Time Fraud (IDW, September 2012)
- Doctor Who Adventures - "The Lunar Tyk" (issue #191, November 2010)

== Non-fiction ==
Dinnick has written a number of non-fiction works:

- The Internet Atlas (Parkgate, 2000)
- A History of the Internet (Pocket Essentials, 2002)
- The Big Finish Companion: Volume I (Big Finish, 2011)
- Moshi Monsters: The Official Collectable Figures Guide (Penguin, 2012)
- Doctor Who: The Official Anniversary Sticker Book (Penguin, 2013)
- Doctor Who - TARDIS (Running Press, 2013)
- Doctor Who - Dalek (Running Press, 2013)
- Doctor Who - Cyberman (Running Press, 2013)
- Doctor Who - Sonic Screwdriver (Running Press, 2014)
- Doctor Who - K9 (Running Press, 2015)
- Doctor Who - Weeping Angel (Running Press, 2015)
- Doctor Who - Adipose (Running Press, 2016)
- "Doctor Who - Supreme Dalek" (Running Press, 2016)

As editor:

- The Big Finish Companion: Volume II (Big Finish, 2013)

== Honours & awards ==
- BAFTA Judge, The Children's BAFTA Awards, 2019
- Speaker, Norwich Sound and Vision Festival, 2019
- Judge, BBC Radio 2: 500 Words Competition, 2018
- Judge, BBC Radio 2: 500 Words Competition, 2017
- NBC Universal Writers Development Initiative, 2016
- Judge, BBC Radio 2: 500 Words Competition, 2016
- NBC Universal Writers Development Initiative, 2015
- Judge, BBC Radio 2: 500 Words Competition, 2015
- Speaker, Norwich Sound and Vision Festival, 2014
- Session Producer, The Children's Media Conference, 2014
- Judge, BBC Radio 2: 500 Words Competition, 2014
- BAFTA Judge, The Children's BAFTA Awards, 2013
- Judge, BBC Radio 2: 500 Words Competition, 2013
- Guest Speaker, The London Screenwriter's Festival, 2012
- Winner, BBC Writersroom TV Writing Opportunity, 2012
- Top Doctor Who Writers to Follow - Doctor Who Magazine, 2012
- Finalist, Duracell "Entangled” Script Competition, 2011
- Chair, Government Committee on Web Design Best Practice, 2001
- Finalist, PTC New Journalist of the Year Award, 1999
