= List of Stargate literature =

This is a list of Stargate literature.

== Based on the film ==
No.	Title	Written by	Timeline		ISBN
1–101	"Stargate"	Dean Devlin & Roland Emmerich (ghostwriter: Stephen Molstad)	Stargate	December 1994	TBA
2–102	"Rebellion"	Bill McCay	One year after Stargate	October 1995	TBA
3–103	"Retaliation"	Bill McCay	One week after Rebellion	September 1996	TBA
4–104	"Retribution"	Bill McCay	Several weeks after Retaliation	May 1997	TBA
5–105	"Reconnaissance"	Bill McCay	—	May 1998	TBA
6–106	"Resistance"	Bill McCay	—	October 1999	TBA

== Based on the television series ==
=== Novels published by ROC ===
No.	Title	Written by	Timeline	Show		ISBN
1–101	"Stargate SG-1"	Ashley McConnell	"Children of the Gods"	Stargate SG-1	October 1998	TBA
2–102	"The Price You Pay"	Ashley McConnell	Season 1	Stargate SG-1	July 1999	TBA
3–103	"The First Amendment"	Ashley McConnell	Season 2	Stargate SG-1	February 2000	TBA
4–104	"The Morpheus Factor"	Ashley McConnell	Season 3	Stargate SG-1	February 2001	TBA

=== Burgschmiet Verlag novels ===
No.	Title	Written by	Timeline	Show		ISBN
1–101	"Kinder der Götter"	Martin Eisele	"Children of the Gods"	Stargate SG-1	1999	TBA
2–102	"Der Feind meines Feindes"	Wolfgang Hohlbein	Season 1	Stargate SG-1	1999	TBA
3–103	"Kreuzwege der Zeit"	Wolfgang Hohlbein	TBC	Stargate SG-1	2000	TBA
4–104	"Jagd ins Ungewisse"	Wolfgang Hohlbein	Season 1 or 2	Stargate SG-1	2000	TBA
5–105	"Unsichtbare Feinde"	Wolfgang Hohlbein	TBC	Stargate SG-1	2001	TBA
6–106	"Tödlicher Verrat"	Wolfgang Hohlbein	"Upgrades"	Stargate SG-1	September 2001	TBA
7–107	"Das Bündis"	Frank Rehfeld	"The Serpent's Venom"	Stargate SG-1	March 2002	TBA

=== Fandemonium novels ===
No.	Title	Written by	Timeline	Show		ISBN
SG1–1	"Trial By Fire"	Sabine C. Bauer	Season 7	Stargate SG-1	June 2004	TBA
SG1–2	"Sacrifice Moon"	Julie Fortune	Season 1	Stargate SG-1	September 2004	TBA
SG1–3	"A Matter of Honor (1 of 2)"	Sally Malcolm	Season 7	Stargate SG-1	November 2004	TBA
SG1–4	"City of the Gods"	Sonny Whitelaw	Season 5	Stargate SG-1	January 2005	TBA
SG1–5	"The Cost of Honor (2 of 2)"	Sally Malcolm	Season 7	Stargate SG-1	September 9, 2005	TBA
SG1–6	"Siren Song"	Jaimie Duncan & Holly Scott	Season 7	Stargate SG-1	February 7, 2006	TBA
SG1–7	"Survival of the Fittest"	Sabine C. Bauer	Season 5	Stargate SG-1	July 7, 2006	TBA
SG1–8	"Alliances"	Karen Miller	Season 4	Stargate SG-1	September 15, 2006	TBA
SG1–9	"Roswell"	Sonny Whitelaw & Jennifer Fallon	Season 10	Stargate SG-1	June 25, 2007	TBA
SG1–10	"Relativity"	James Swallow	Season 7	Stargate SG-1	October 2007	TBA
SG1–11	"Barque of Heaven"	Suzanne Wood	Season 3	Stargate SG-1	February 2008	TBA
SG1–12	"Do No Harm"	Karen Miller	Season 3	Stargate SG-1	June 2008	TBA
SG1–13	"Hydra"	Jaimie Duncan and Holly Scott	Season 5	Stargate SG-1	December 2008	TBA
SG1–14	"Valhalla"	Tim Waggoner	Season 7	Stargate SG-1	September 2009	TBA
SG1–15	"The Power Behind The Throne"	Steven Savile	Season 5	Stargate SG-1	May 2010	TBA
SG1–16	"The Four Dragons"	Diana Dru Botsford	Season 7	Stargate SG-1	June 2010	TBA
SG1–17	"Sunrise"	J. F. Crane	Season 4	Stargate SG-1	October 2010	TBA
SG1–18	"Transitions"	Sabine C. Bauer	Season 8	Stargate SG-1	October 2010	TBA
SG1–19	"Oceans of Dust"	Peter J. Evans	Season 4	Stargate SG-1	March 2011	TBA
SG1–20	"Heart's Desire"	Amy Griswold	Season 3	Stargate SG-1	August 2012	TBA
SG1–21	"The Drift"	Diana Dru Botsford	Season 8	Stargate SG-1	October 2012	TBA
SG1–22	"Moebius Squared"	Jo Graham & Melissa Scott	Post Continuum	Stargate SG-1	January 2013	TBA
SG1–23	"Ouroboros"	Melissa Scott	Season 8	Stargate SG-1	June 2013	TBA
SG1–24	"Two Roads"	Geonn Cannon	Season 8	Stargate SG-1	June 2014	TBA
SG1–25	"Hostile Ground (Book 1 in the Apocalypse series)"	Sally Malcolm & Laura Harper	Season 3 (takes place between 3x17"A Hundred Days" and 3x18 "Shades of Grey")	Stargate SG-1	August 2014	TBA
SG1–26	"Murder at the SGC"	Amy Griswold	Season 10	Stargate SG-1	April 2015	TBA
SG1–27	"Exile (Book 2 in the Apocalypse series)"	Sally Malcolm & Laura Harper	Season 3 (takes place between 3x17"A Hundred Days" and 3x18 "Shades of Grey")	Stargate SG-1	August 2015	TBA
SG1–28	"Kali's Wrath"	Keith R. A. DeCandido	Season 5	Stargate SG-1	May 2016	TBA
SG1–29	"Hall of the Two Truths"	Susannah Parker Sinard	Season 5	Stargate SG-1	August 2016	TBA
SG1–30	"Insurrection (Book 3 in the Apocalypse series)"	Sally Malcolm & Laura Harper	Season 3 (takes place between 3x17"A Hundred Days" and 3x18 "Shades of Grey")	Stargate SG-1	December 2016	TBA
SG1–31	"Female of the Species"	Geonn Cannon	After S10E17 "Talion"	Stargate SG-1	2018	TBA
SG1–32	"Infiltration"	Susannah Parker Sinard	Prior to S4E20 "Entity"	Stargate SG-1	2019	TBA

=== Stargate Atlantis ===
No.	Title	Written by	Timeline	Show		ISBN
SGA–1	"Rising"	Sally Malcolm	Season 1	Stargate Atlantis	December 15, 2005	TBA
SGA–2	"Reliquary"	Martha Wells	Season 1	Stargate Atlantis	February 2006	TBA
SGA–3	"The Chosen"	Sonny Whitelaw & Elizabeth Christensen	Season 1	Stargate Atlantis	April 19, 2006	TBA
SGA–4	"Halcyon"	James Swallow	Season 2	Stargate Atlantis	August 7, 2006	TBA
SGA–5	"Exogenesis"	Sonny Whitelaw & Elizabeth Christensen	Season 2	Stargate Atlantis	December 2006	TBA
SGA–6	"Entanglement"	Martha Wells	Season 2	Stargate Atlantis	April 2007	TBA
SGA–7	"Casualties of War"	Elizabeth Christensen	Season 3	Stargate Atlantis	September 25, 2007	TBA
SGA–8	"Blood Ties"	Sonny Whitelaw & Elizabeth Christensen	Season 3	Stargate Atlantis	December 2007	TBA
SGA–9	"Mirror Mirror"	Sabine C. Bauer	Season 2	Stargate Atlantis	August 2008	TBA
SGA–10	"Nightfall"	James Swallow	Season 4	Stargate Atlantis	February 2009	TBA
SGA–11	"Angelus"	Peter J. Evans	Season 4	Stargate Atlantis	March 2009	TBA
SGA–12	"Dead End"	Chris Wraight	Season 3	Stargate Atlantis	November 2009	TBA
SGA–13	"Hunt and Run"	Aaron S. Rosenberg	Season 5	Stargate Atlantis	April 2010	TBA
SGA–14	"Death Game"	Jo Graham	Season 2	Stargate Atlantis	July 2010	TBA
SGA–15	"Brimstone"	David Niall Wilson & Patricia Macomber	Season 5	Stargate Atlantis	February 2010	TBA
SGA–16	"Homecoming (Book 1 in the Legacy series)"	Jo Graham & Melissa Scott	Post-Season 5	Stargate Atlantis	October 2010	TBA
SGA–17	"The Lost (Book 2 in the Legacy series)"	Jo Graham & Amy Griswold	Post-Season 5	Stargate Atlantis	February 2011	TBA
SGA–18	"Allegiance (Book 3 in the Legacy series)"	Melissa Scott & Amy Griswold	Post-Season 5	Stargate Atlantis	November 2011	TBA
SGA–19	"The Furies (Book 4 in the Legacy series)"	Meg Burden & Jo Graham	Post-Season 5	Stargate Atlantis	June 2012	TBA
SGA–20	"Secrets (Book 5 in the Legacy series)"	Meg Burden & Melissa Scott	Post-Season 5	Stargate Atlantis	August 2012	TBA
SGA–21	"The Inheritors (Book 6 in the Legacy series)"	Jo Graham, Melissa Scott, Amy Griswold	Post-Season 5	Stargate Atlantis	April 2013	TBA
SGA–22	"Unascended (Book 7 in the Legacy series)"	Jo Graham, Amy Griswold	Post-Season 5	Stargate Atlantis	July 2014	TBA
SGA–23	"Third Path (Book 8 in the Legacy series)"	Melissa Scott, Jo Graham	Post-Season 5	Stargate Atlantis	July 2015	TBA
SGA–24	"Pride of the Genii (A Legacy Novel)"	Melissa Scott	Post-Season 5	Stargate Atlantis	2018	TBA

=== Stargate Universe ===
No.	Title	Written by	Timeline	Show		ISBN
SGU–1	"Air"	James Swallow	Season 1	Stargate Universe	November 2009	TBA

=== Novellas ===
No.	Title	Written by	Timeline	Show		ISBN
SGX–01	"Far Horizons"	Various	—	SG-1, Atlantis	October 2014	TBA
SGX–02	"Permafrost"	Sally Malcolm	Season 2	Stargate SG-1	December 2014	TBA
SGX–03	"Points of Origin"	Various	Various	SG-1, Atlantis	November 2015	TBA
SGX–04	"Lost Queen"	Melissa Scott	Post-Legacy series	Stargate Atlantis	December 2015	TBA
SGX–05	"Wild Blue"	Melissa Scott	TBC	Stargate Atlantis	June 2016	TBA
SGX–06	"Homeworlds"	Various	Various	SG-1, Atlantis	June 2017	TBA
SGX–07	"Behind Enemy Lines"	Sally Malcolm	10 years after "Fragile Balance"	SG-1, Atlantis	August 2017	TBA
SGX–08	"From the Depths"	Amy Griswold	Post-Legacy series	Stargate Atlantis	February 2018	TBA

== Short fiction ==
The official Stargate Magazine, produced by Titan Publishing, began publishing short stories written by Fandemonium authors in their 8th issue. The stories alternate between both SG-1 and Atlantis. The magazine was available in the UK and internationally through Diamond Comic Distributors' Previews catalogue, and ended with issue #36.

Issue	Title	Series	Author	Timeline	Release date	ISBN
#7	"Flipside"	Stargate Atlantis	Sally Malcolm	Pre-series until "Rising"	November 2005	TBA
How Sheppard ended up on McMurdo Station
#8	"Archeology 101"	Stargate SG-1	Martha Wells	Season 2	January 2006	TBA
Archaeological dig gone wrong for Dr. Jackson
#10	"Choices"	Stargate Atlantis	James Swallow	After "Runner"	May 2006	TBA
Lt. Aiden Ford
#11	"Medical Considerations"	Stargate SG-1	Karen Miller	Season 4	July 2006	TBA
Dr. Janet Fraiser
#12	"The Companion"	Stargate Atlantis	Sally Malcolm	Season 2 or 3	September 2006	TBA
Dr. Rodney McKay gets trapped with a mad hologram
#13	"Juju"	Stargate SG-1	Sabine C. Bauer	Season 6	November 2006	TBA
The aftermath of Daniel Jackson's death
#14	"A Pebble On The Cairn"	Stargate Atlantis	Jaimie Duncan	Season 3	February 2007	TBA
Ronon Dex
#15	"Course Corrections"	Stargate Atlantis	Elizabeth Christensen	Season 3, during "The Return, Part 1"	April 2007	TBA
John Sheppard
#16	"The Bitter Hearth"	Stargate SG-1	Holly Scott	Near the start of Season 4	June 2007	TBA
Teal'c
#18	"K-T"	Stargate SG-1	Sonny Whitelaw & Jennifer Fallon	After the end of Season 10	September 2007	TBA
Vala Mal Doran
#19	"Waypoints"	Stargate Atlantis	Elizabeth Christensen	Between Season 2 & 3	November 2007	TBA
John Sheppard, Rodney McKay, Teyla Emmagan & Ronon Dex
#20	"Outsiders"	Stargate SG-1	James Swallow	Season 9	January 2008	TBA
Cameron Mitchell
#22	"Genealogy"	Stargate Atlantis	Sabine C. Bauer	Just after "Mirror Mirror"	June 2008	TBA
John Sheppard
#23	"Post Mortem"	Stargate Atlantis	Karen Miller	Season 3, after "Sunday"	August 2008	TBA
Rodney McKay
#25	"Murphy's Law of Stargate Travel"	Stargate SG-1	Suzanne Wood	Pre Season 6	December 2008	TBA
Jack O'Neill, Samantha Carter, Daniel Jackson & Teal'c
#28	"By Way of the Stars (Part 1 of 3)"	Stargate SG-1	Suzanne Wood	Season 10	June 2009	TBA
Cameron Mitchell, Samantha Carter, Daniel Jackson & Teal'c
#29	"By Way of the Stars: To The Sea (Part 2 of 3)"	Stargate SG-1	Suzanne Wood	Season 10	August 2009	TBA
Cameron Mitchell, Samantha Carter, Daniel Jackson & Teal'c
#30	"By Way of the Stars: To The Sea and Home Again (Part 3 of 3)"	Stargate SG-1	Suzanne Wood	Season 10	October 2009	TBA
Cameron Mitchell, Samantha Carter, Daniel Jackson & Teal'c
#31	"I, Ba'al"	Stargate SG-1	Sally Malcolm	Season 6, before "Abyss"	December 2009	TBA
Ba'al & Jack O'Neill
#33	"Gods and Heroes"	Stargate Atlantis	Jo Graham	Pre Season 1, "Rising"	April 2010	TBA
Teyla Emmagan & Charin
#34	"The Ghosts of Sanctity"	Stargate SG-1	Peter J. Evans	Season 5	June 2010	TBA
Jack O'Neill, Samantha Carter, Daniel Jackson & Teal'c
