= Sonny Whitelaw =

Australian novelist

Sonny Whitelaw (born 9 August 1956) is the author of several contemporary ecothriller and speculative fiction novels including five Stargate novels.

Whitelaw was born in Sydney, Australia and completed a degree in Geography and Anthropology at Sydney University; however, she abandoned a Master's thesis in Coastal Geomorphology in 1980 to work as a photojournalist and run dive charter yachts in the Republic of Vanuatu. She later founded The Adventure Centre, an adventure tourism company, and wrote the Vanuatu government's online encyclopedia. She obtained an MA from Queensland University of Technology in 2008 and Post Graduate Diploma in Sustainable Management in 2012 from Open Polytechnic New Zealand.

Whitelaw is a professional photographer and freelance photojournalist as well as author. Her work has appeared in several international magazines including National Geographic. The subject of climate change is central to much of her writing. She currently lives in the Canterbury foothills west of Christchurch New Zealand working as the manager of BRaid, an environmental trust.

== Novels ==
- Ark Ship: Science Fiction, December 2004
- The Rhesus Factor: Eco-thriller, April 2005/ 2nd edition December 2013
- Stargate SG-1 City of the Gods, April 2005
- Chimera: Thriller, December 2005
- Stargate Atlantis The Chosen, April 2006, co-authored with Elizabeth Christensen
- Journeys of the Mind: June 2006 edited anthology includes short stories by Sean Williams author of three Star Wars novels and Marianne de Pierres
- Stargate Atlantis Exogenesis, December 2006, co-authored with Elizabeth Christensen
- Stargate SG-1: Roswell, April 2007, co-authored with Jennifer Fallon
- Stargate Atlantis: Blood Ties, April 2007, co-authored with Elizabeth Christensen
- Bone Menagerie: Urban fantasy, June 2013
