= Stargate (1995 console video game) =

- Developers: Probe Software (Genesis); Tantalus Interactive (Super NES)
- Publisher: Acclaim Entertainment
- Composers: Steve Collett, Andy Brock
- Platforms: Super NES, Genesis
- Release: NA: March 1995; EU: March 24, 1995
- Genre: Platform
- Mode: Single-player

Stargate is a 1995 platform game by Acclaim Entertainment for the Super Nintendo Entertainment System and Genesis/Mega Drive. It follows the adventures of Colonel Jack O'Neill as he struggles to free the slaves of Abydos, defeat Ra, and get his mission team back home using the stargate device. The game is based on the 1994 film of the same name.

== Plot ==
The game begins in the deserts of Abydos shortly after the mission team has landed using the stargate. The mission is to collect samples and then return to Earth, but Colonel Jack O’Neil has also secretly brought along a nuclear bomb to seal the stargate if the mission team discovers a threat. A sandstorm has separated Colonel O’Neill from his mission team, and the bomb is missing. Daniel Jackson, the Egyptology specialist of the mission team, informs him that the team's basecamp was attacked by Ra. The local inhabitants of Abydos, the Nagadans, have helped the team escape the attack, but the supplies were left behind in caves. O’Neil will have to find the supplies, the bomb, and seven Egyptian hieroglyphs scattered throughout the area, the last needed to work the stargate and get his men home.

O’Neill begins by searching for the supplies in the various caves found in the desert and once found, enters the village of Nagada. O’Neill learns that the four village elders can help him find his team. Once he has located the elders, they inform him that his men can be found in the catacombs outside the village. O’Neill finds his men, who tell him that Ra's general, Anubis, is after the Nagadan rebel leader named Sha’uri. Realizing that he will need the Nagadan's help to complete his mission, O’Neill must find and destroy Anubis in the village before he can get to Sha’uri and stop the rebellion. This leads to a one-on-one fight between O’Neill and Anubis.

After temporarily defeating Anubis, O’Neill meets up with Sha’uri, and is asked to find a local boy, Skaara, who is crucial to the rebellion. O’Neill finds Skaara outside the village and is told the bomb has been separated into seven pieces that must be found. Jackson contacts O’Neill, asking him to search for Sha’uri, who has disguised herself as an elder, somewhere in the village to avoid Anubis. Once found, O’Neil is off again in search of Jackson and Skaara in the desert. When O’Neil finds Skaara, he is told that Jackson has been taken prisoner by Ra and is being held inside Ra's hidden spaceship. Once rescued, Jackson tells O’Neil that the rebellion is in trouble because of traitors within it. O’Neil flies one of Ra's downed yet serviceable gliders back the village to find and destroy the traitors.

Once the traitors are destroyed, a thankful elder gives O’Neil some herbs to help Jackson, who was injured while leaving Ra's hidden spaceship. Once found and healed, Jackson informs O’Neil that Sha’uri has been captured by Anubis. This leads to a second one-on-one fight between O’Neil and Anubis. After Anubis is defeated for good, O’Neil raids the armory of Ra's spaceship and creates a plan. Jackson will cripple the guidance system of Ra's glider force inside Ra's spaceship while O’Neil will arm the rebellion with weapons stolen from the spaceship. Realizing that the rebellion is still outnumbered, O’Neil takes to the air to destroy several of Ra's gliders. After landing, O’Neil searches for a village elder who can show him a secret route into Ra's pyramid. Once inside, O’Neil joins Jackson in crippling the guidance systems of Ra's gliders and disabling the glider bay doors to prevent any gliders from landing or taking off. Now the Nagadan forces are ready to assault Ra's spaceship. Just before the rebellion's assault begins, Jackson and Sha’uri are taken prisoner on board the spaceship. O’Neil goes to face Ra, one-on-one.

Once Ra has been nearly defeated, he attempts to trap O’Neil inside his spaceship and takeoff. Jackson radios O’Neil, warning him to escape. O’Neil sets the bomb and escapes the spaceship as it explodes, destroying Ra.

== Gameplay ==
The gameplay is typical of the sidescrolling, platform games of the era. The player controls Colonel Jack O’Neill and navigates him through the various locations by walking/running, jumping and climbing. O’Neill's health is indicated by an energy bar found alongside information such as weapon status and grenade count on the heads-up display. Most missions consist of finding people or items in one of several different locations. There are two missions that involve flying one of Ra's gliders and partaking in dogfight style combat. The radio screen displays the player's current mission, as well as other information such as the number of lives, continues, hieroglyphs, bomb pieces, and current password.

There are many different enemies through the game, ranging from minor inconveniences like the fleeting scarab beetles to the difficult Horus guards. There are three boss encounters; Anubis twice, and the final confrontation with Ra. If the player has not collected all seven bomb pieces and all seven hieroglyphs by end of the game, they will lose the game, even if they defeat Ra.

The player is equipped with a single machine gun with infinite ammunition that can be temporarily upgraded with pickup items such as rapid fire, wide fire, ammunition strength, and the gun coolant. The player can also pickup and hold up to 99 standard grenades in addition to the more powerful alien grenades.

== Reception ==
Reception

Review scores
Publication	Score
Electronic Gaming Monthly	3.9/10
GameFan	256/300
GamePro	3.9/5
Next Generation	3/5
Game Players	52/100
Sega Pro	64/100
Sega Power	78/100

The four reviewers of Electronic Gaming Monthly gave the Genesis version an average score of 3.875 out of 10. Though some of them were impressed by the graphics and animation, they all commented that the controls make it impossible to enjoy the game, elaborating that "Just simple skills, like jumping from ledge to ledge or shooting diagonally down, requires some serious effort on your part". GamePro likewise felt the controls to be confusing, and also criticized the "visual banality" of the enemies. They nonetheless concluded that "Stargate will definitely not disappoint adventure fans or players who are looking for an exciting platform piece with purpose," citing the varied and graphically impressive settings and well-designed platform gameplay. They made similar comments about the Super NES version, which they judged to be "identical to the Genesis version" aside from having a less confusing control configuration. A reviewer for Next Generation, while deriding the side-scrolling gameplay as both unoriginal and unfaithful to the source material, admitted that he found the game fun for its solid level design and particularly its smooth character animation. He gave the Super NES version three out of five stars.

Next Generation reviewed the Genesis version of the game, rating it three stars out of five, and stated that "Overall, Stargate is a well done game. It's just that this kind of thing has been done so many times before, and better."

== See also ==
- Stargate games
