= List of Stargate games =

Stargate games are inspired by the Stargate franchise, which started with the 1994 film, Stargate directed by Roland Emmerich.

The games in this article are not related to the 1981 arcade game Stargate by Williams Electronics.

== Games ==
=== Stargate pinball ===
Stargate is a 1995 pinball game, designed by Ray Tanzer and Jon Norris and released by Gottlieb. The game is based on the film Stargate, not the television show Stargate SG-1. It has many modes, including several multi-ball modes.

A "pyramid" is the main feature of this game. It has a top that opens by raising and lowering. A moving "Glidercraft" ship will be extended from the pyramid when the pyramid is open. The "Glidercraft" will zigzag left-right, in front of the pyramid, with about 90 degrees of horizontal movement.

This game also features two "Horus" targets. These are basically the reverse of drop targets: they are targets that, rather than dropping down into the playfield when hit, rise up into the air. Each target is attached to a large "Horus" structure, which is itself attached to a pivot that can raise and lower. These Horus structures drop to block the player from reaching two key shots. The game occasionally raises them, allowing the player to temporarily make the shots. Part of the development involved having actor James Spader record the voice parts of Daniel Jackson.

=== Stargate SG-1 roleplaying games ===
==== Stargate SG-1 Adventure Game (1998) ====
The Stargate SG-1 Adventure Game was a role-playing game based on the Canadian-American television series Stargate SG-1. In 1998, West End Games obtained a license to develop derivative works from the television show. They hired John Scott Tynes to develop the property for them using WEG's D6 System. WEG ran into financial difficulties and the Stargate SG-1 Adventure Game project was cancelled, after Tynes had completed about two-thirds of the game. Tynes was refused payment for his work, and he subsequently made the incomplete game available for download from his website.

==== Stargate SG-1 Roleplaying Game (2003) ====
The Stargate SG-1 Roleplaying Game is a role-playing game based on the Canadian-American television series Stargate SG-1, released in 2003 by Alderac Entertainment Group. The game, based on AEG's Spycraft, uses the d20 System. It was considered canon by the publishers and the staff of MGM. When Sony purchased MGM, MGM lost the license to produce Stargate game products and the development license is unassigned.

==== Stargate SG-1 Roleplaying Game (2021) ====
The Stargate SG-1 Roleplaying Game is a role-playing game based on the Canadian-American television series Stargate SG-1. It was developed by Wyvern Gaming through a collaboration with MGM, and was originally set to be released in 2020, but was later postponed to a 2021 release date, starting with a Kickstarter in October 2020. The game is based on the Dungeons & Dragons 5th edition Open Game License.

=== Stargate SG-1 board game (2004) ===
Fleet Games produced a board game based on the TV series.

== Video games ==
=== Stargate (1994, handheld) ===
The first Stargate video game film tie-in was a Tetris-like puzzle game released for the Nintendo Game Boy in 1994 and the Sega Game Gear in 1995. It was developed by Probe Software and published by Acclaim Entertainment.

=== Stargate (1995, console) ===
Simply titled Stargate, this movie tie-in was an action game where the player controlled Jack O'Neill. This game was developed by Probe Software for the Sega Genesis and Tantalus Interactive for the Super NES and published by Acclaim Entertainment in 1995.

=== Stargate SG-1: The Alliance ===
Stargate SG-1: The Alliance, (abbreviated as SG-1:TA), is a cancelled game based on Stargate SG-1. Development was cancelled in August 2005.

The game was said to have been based upon the events of the SG-1 seasons; the player was able to select their character for a mission and fulfill the roles of that character as seen in the TV show. It was confirmed that the Alliance part of the name referred to the Alliance between Anubis and the new enemy, Haaken. The Haaken have never appeared in the TV show, they are a new alien race that was created by the developer's concept artists and game designers. The game was an FPS with an option for a third person perspective, consisting of objectives to be reached during various missions and levels. Since the developers have not shown much of the gameplay, it is not clear how exactly the game was meant to play out. However, from the video from the Stargate Atlantis: Rising DVD, it appears to follow the storyline well. In 2012, gaming blog Past to Present Online began to release information about the game, including gameplay videos that revealed the storyline and mechanics.

According to IGN, an "administrator posting in the game's official forum stated that the game has been cancelled". However, this has never been officially confirmed by the developer, Perception Studios, despite laying off the majority of its staff in January 2006.

After a two-year-long legal battle with JoWood Productions, Perception won their fight in December 2007 with JoWood admitting they had no rights to the Stargate franchise. In fact, Perception has all rights to the Stargate SG-1: The Alliance game, and any further Stargate game releases. It was expected that work would now continue in some way on The Alliance, although existing parts of the already made game may not be used. Peter DeLuise was especially disappointed, having devoted much time to the game's development (albeit primarily the audio portion).

=== Stargate Worlds ===
Stargate Worlds (abbreviated as SGW) was to be a massively multiplayer online role-playing game (MMORPG) video game in-development by Cheyenne Mountain Entertainment (CME) (in association with Metro-Goldwyn-Mayer) (MGM) and was to be published by FireSky for Microsoft Windows. The game's setting was mainly borrowed from military science fiction series Stargate SG-1. It was announced that Cheyenne Mountain Entertainment is under evaluation by a receiver and that development of Stargate Worlds has ceased.

=== Stargate: Resistance ===
Stargate: Resistance
- Developer: Cheyenne Mountain Entertainment
- Publisher: FireSky
- Engine: Unreal Engine 3
- Platform: Windows
- Release: February 10, 2010
- Genre: Third-person shooter
- Mode: Multiplayer

Stargate: Resistance (abbreviated as SGR) is an online, third-person shooter owned and operated by Dark Comet Games, powered by the Unreal 3 engine, and based on the television series Stargate SG-1. It was announced in December 2009 and originally released in 2010 by Firesky and Cheyenne Mountain Entertainment, however Cheyenne Mountain Entertainment has been in receivership since March 2010. Since then, Firesky entered into an agreement with Dark Comet Games for the maintenance, operation and development of Stargate Resistance. The game has sold over 51,000 copies and new downloadable content was being released. No subscription fee was required to play the game. At midnight (PST), January 17, 2011, all Stargate Resistance servers were shut down, including an extensive user forum.

In December 2014, fans of the game were able to bring up new unofficial game servers, allowing users to play the game as it was just before the January 2011 shut down.

=== Stargate SG-1: Unleashed ===
On February 6, 2013, a trailer for Stargate SG-1: Unleashed was posted on IGN. The game is an adventure game featuring the original SG-1 team for Android and iOS, and was developed by MGM and Arkalis Interactive. The story begins when the Goa'uld Sekhmet is inadvertently released from the canopic jar and starts to plot a revenge against the Earth. After Jack O'Neill from the alternate timeline appears at the SGC, the original team is sent to discover and counter the sinister plot by Sekhmet. The first episode was released on March 14, 2013. The second was released November 7, 2013, on iOS only.

=== Stargate: Timekeepers ===
Stargate: Timekeepers is a real-time tactics video game developed by CreativeForge Games and published by Slitherine Software UK Ltd.

According to the publisher, it will be similar to Desperados III or Shadow Tactics and the release date was scheduled for 2022.

On December 14, 2021, the gameplay of the first two missions was revealed during the Home of Wargamers Live+ Winter Edition event. Beta test is scheduled for spring 2022 and final release for summer 2022.

On May 10, 2022, the gameplay of the third mission was revealed during the Home of Wargamers 2022 event. Beta test is finally scheduled around the 25th anniversary of Stargate SG-1 on July 27, 2022.

On January 23, 2024, part 1 of 2 was launched on Steam, consisting of seven single-player episodes set in the SG-1 Universe.
