= Stuart Tyson Smith =

American Egyptologist (born 1960)

- Born: 1960 (age 65–66)
- Education: University of California, Los Angeles
- Scientific career
- Fields: Egyptology
- Workplaces: University of California, Santa Barbara

Stuart Tyson Smith (born 1960) is an American Egyptologist and professor in the Anthropology department at the University of California, Santa Barbara. His specialty is the interaction between ancient Egypt and Nubia.

Smith is known for reconstruction of the ancient Egyptian language for the films Stargate (1994) and The Mummy (1999)

== Bibliography ==
=== Nonfiction ===
- Askut in Nubia (1995)
- Wretched Kush: Ethnic Identities and Boundaries in Egypt's Nubian Empire (2003)
- Valley of the Kings (2003)

=== Contributor ===
- Studies in Culture Contact: Interaction, Culture Change, and Archaeology (1998)
- Box Office Archaeology: Refining Hollywood's Portrayals of the Past (2007)
