= List of Stargate audiobooks =

This is a list of Stargate audiobooks produced by Big Finish Productions. The series of audiobooks began in April 2008 and concluded in December 2012, with 18 instalments released in total. The audiobooks are based around characters and story elements from the military science fiction television shows Stargate SG-1 and Stargate Atlantis, with SG-1 initially running from July 1997 until March 2007 and Atlantis running from July 2004 until January 2009. A number of the main and reoccurring cast members from both SG-1 and Atlantis feature in the partially dramatised audiobooks. Specifically written score and sound effects taken from the shows are used throughout.

The license for Big Finish to make any new, or sell their existing Stargate audiobooks expired in 2015 and as a result, copies were only available secondhand. In July 2022, Big Finish announced that they would be re-releasing their audiobooks as digital downloads, with new artwork to celebrate the 25th Anniversary of the Stargate television franchise.

== Development and production ==
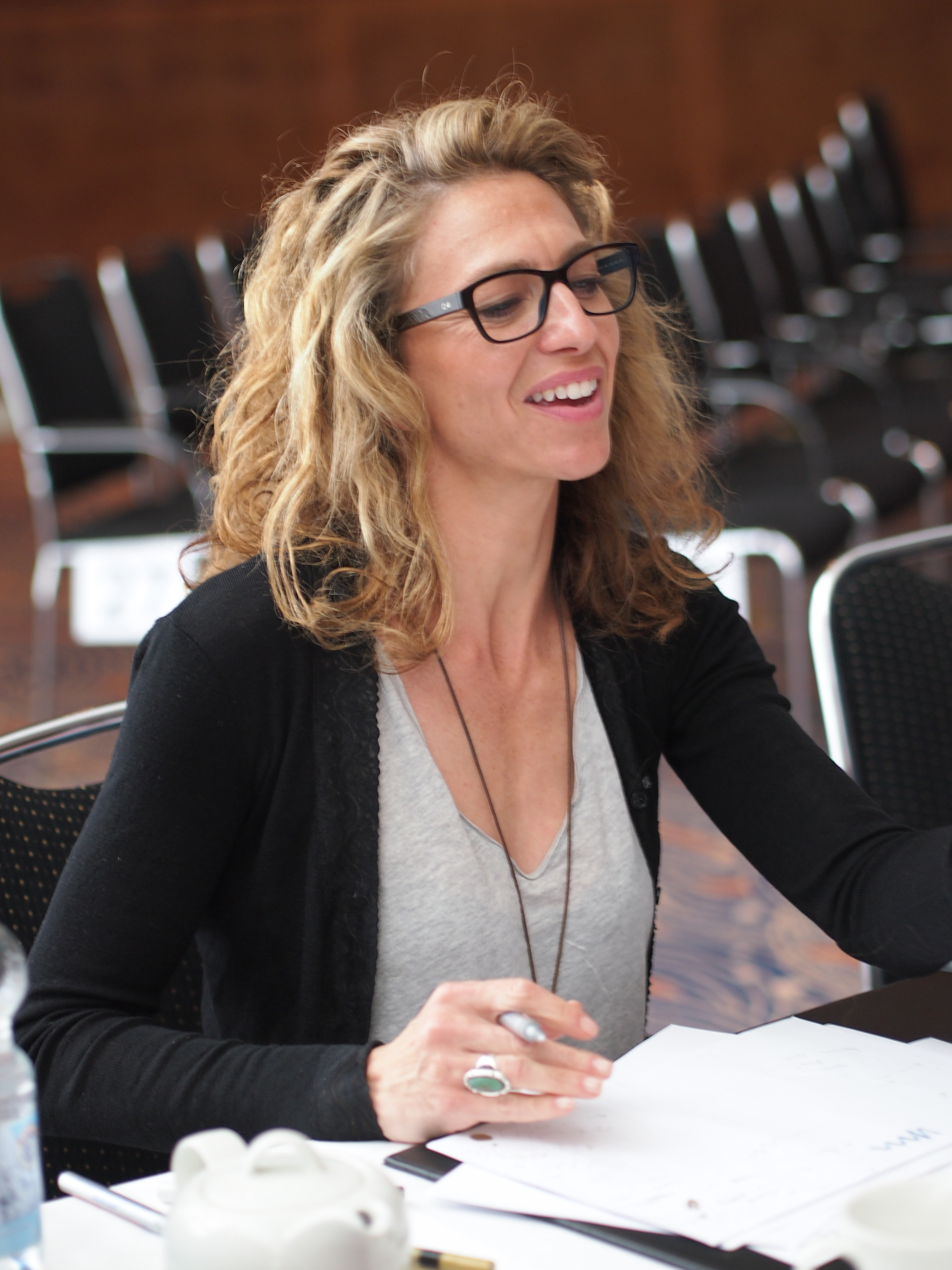
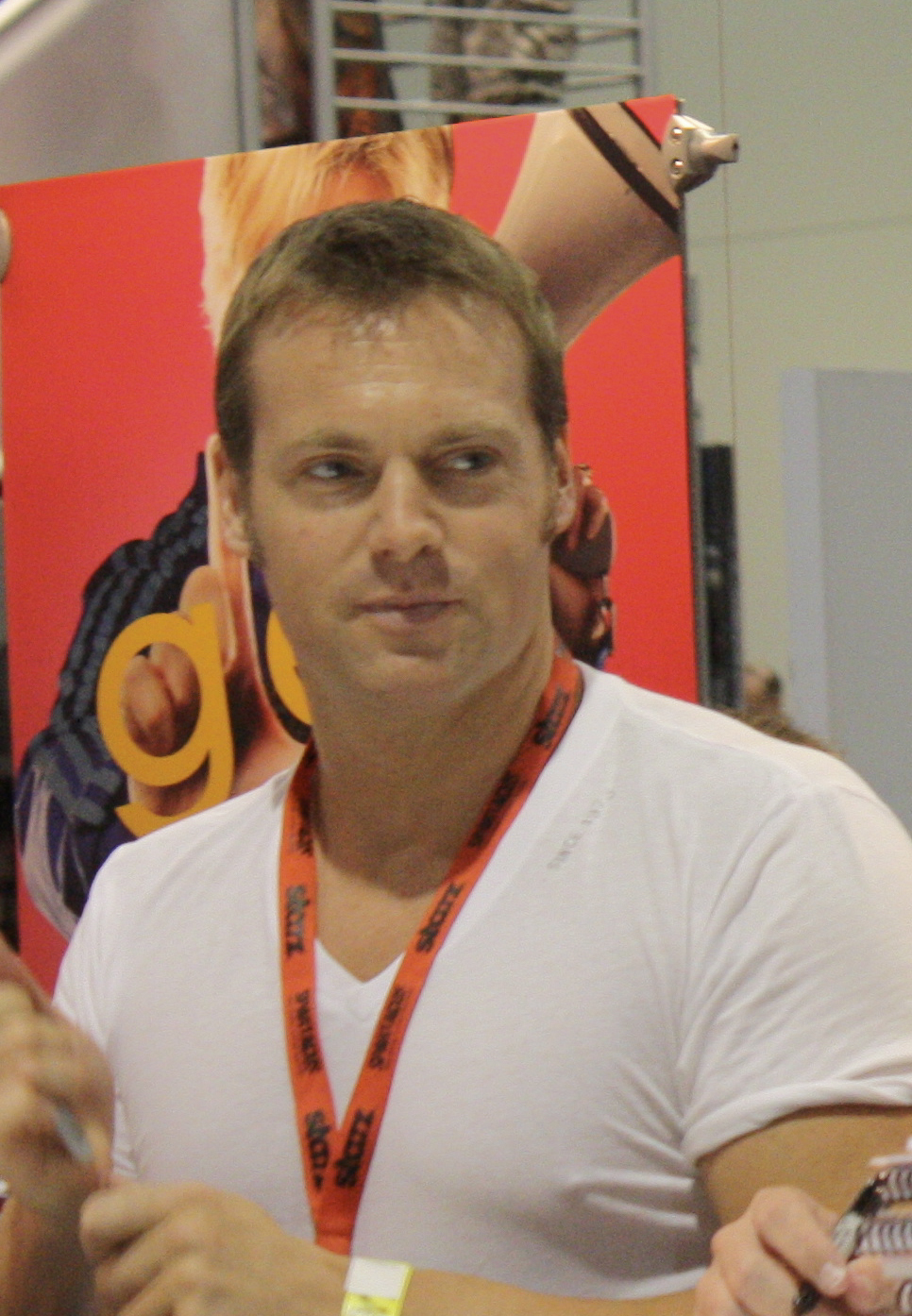
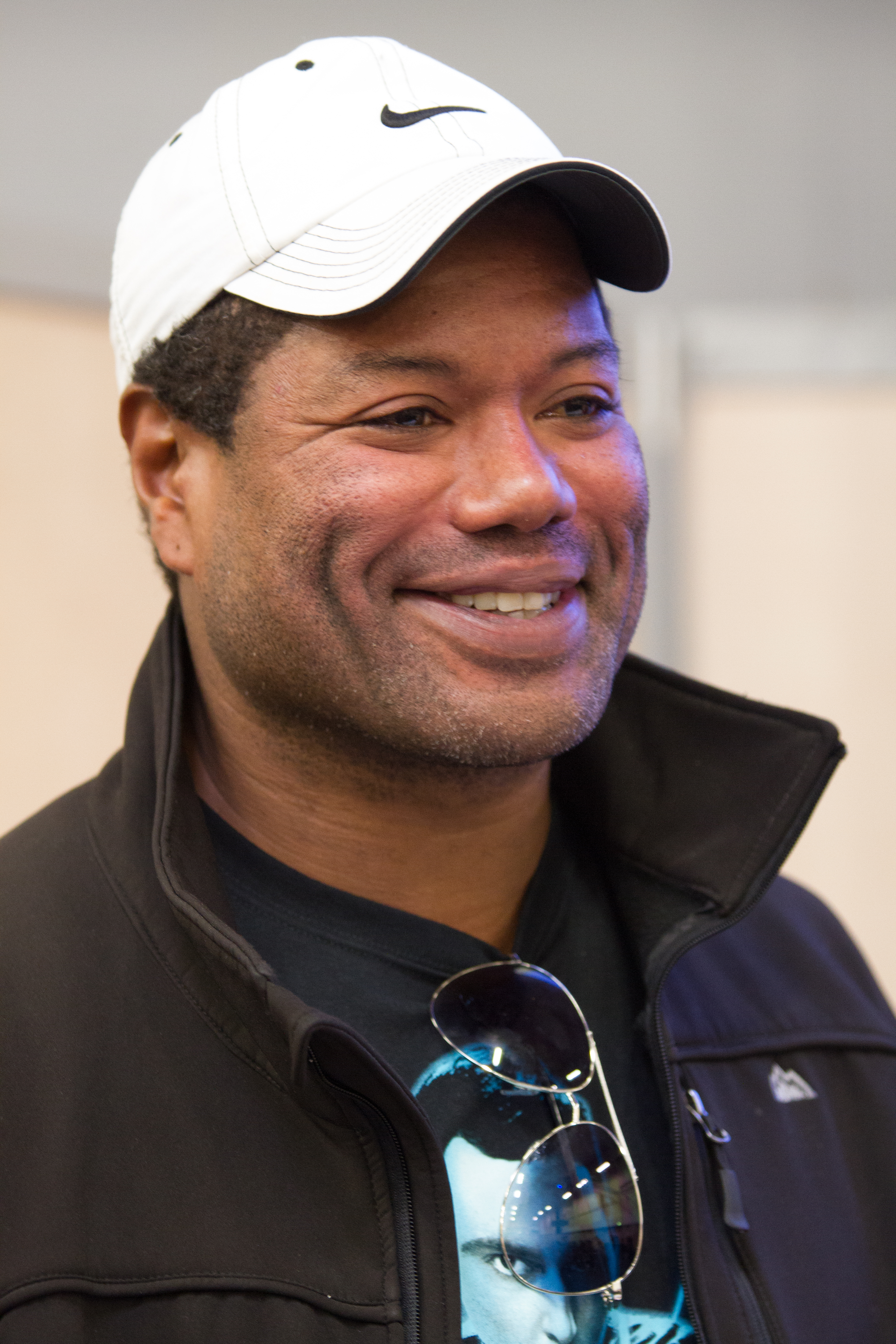
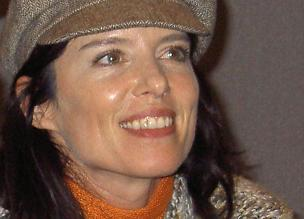
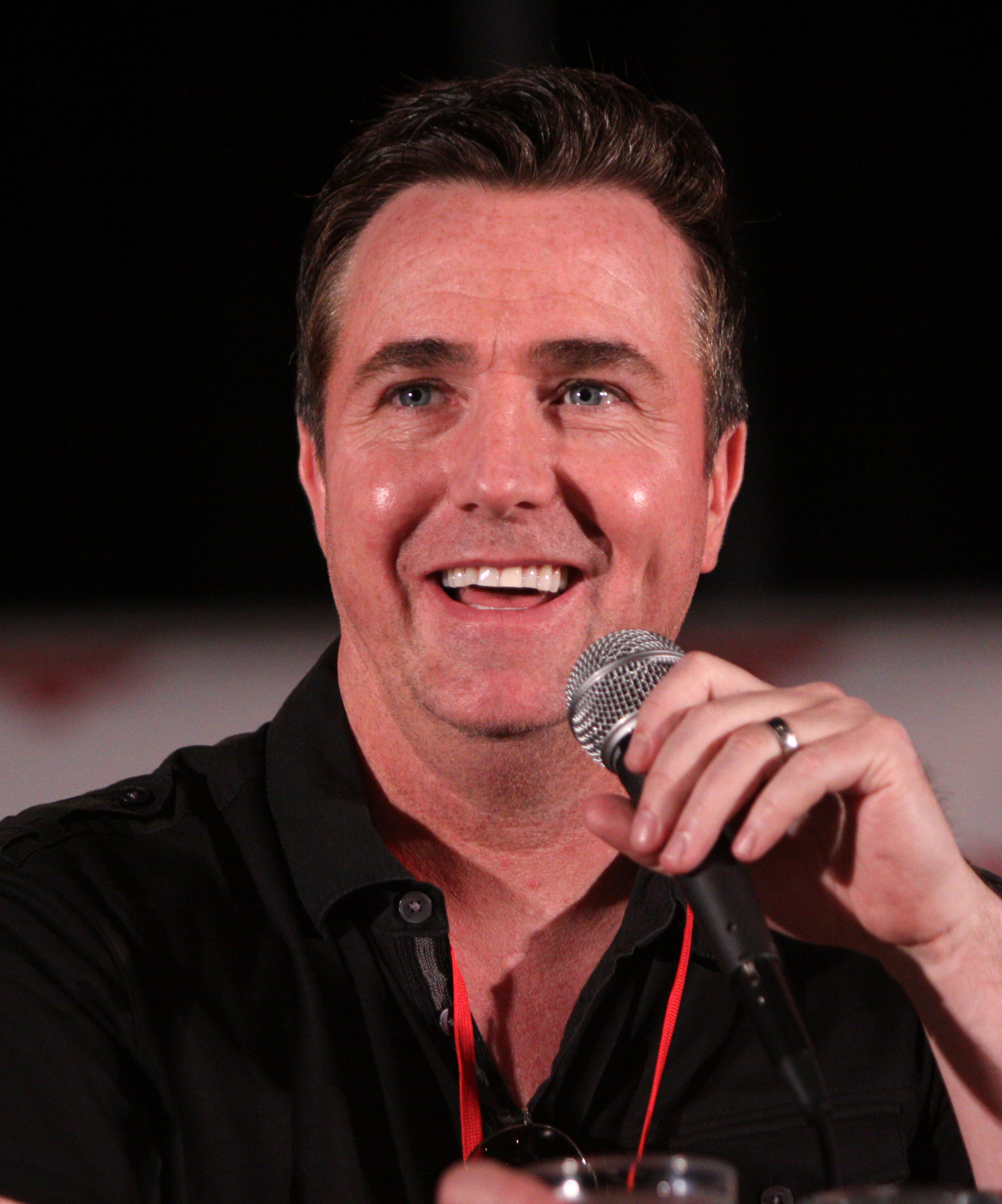
Top row: Claudia Black (left), Michael Shanks and Christopher Judge respectively reprise their roles of Vala Mal Doran, Daniel Jackson, and Teal'c from Stargate SG-1.
Bottom row: Torri Higginson (left) and Paul McGillion respectively reprise their roles of Elizabeth Weir and Carson Beckett from Stargate Atlantis.

Big Finish Productions were first given the rights to release Stargate audiobooks by MGM in 2008, with the first series consisting of six productions which were released monthly from April to September 2008. Three of the productions were based around the characters and elements from Stargate SG-1 and three from Stargate Atlantis, with a cast member from the show reading the story and a second voice actor supporting. A number of authors responsible for Stargate novels, including James Swallow and Sally Malcolm were chosen to write for the series, with Sharon Gosling, who had previously written for the Stargate Official Magazine writing and also serving as producer. Swallow described the productions as a "halfway-house between a traditional talking book and a full-cast audio play", with music, sound effects taken from the television shows and dialogue spoken in the character's voice. Shanks recorded "Gift of the Gods" in London. Many of the stories take place at different points in the Stargate timeline, with "Shell Game" taking place after the Stargate SG-1 episode "The Pegasus Project", whilst "Zero Point" takes place after the Stargate Atlantis episode "Reunion".

A second series was announced by Big Finish in January 2009 for monthly releases starting that May. In some cases, the actors were able to record their parts in the same studio, with Nicolas Briggs and Kavan Smith recording together in London, whilst Christopher Judge and Paul McGillion recorded their parts in Canada, with their scene partner Noel Clark and Neil Roberts recording separately sometime later.

A third series was first mentioned discussed by Big Finish in March 2010, however it wasn't officially announced until January 2012. For the third series, Big Finish noted there had been demand from fans for the audiobooks to feature a full cast of characters, although producer Paul Spagg joked that it could not be the full cast of SG-1 or Atlantis as it "might have bankrupted us before we’d started". The series would star Michael Shanks and Claudia Black, reprising their characters of Daniel Jackson and Vala Mal Doran with Spragg commenting "Their chemistry in both Stargate SG-1 and our series one audio Shell Game was fantastic, and it was a no-brainer to once more pair them up". Spragg and fellow producer Jason Haigh-Ellery were also able cast Cliff Simon, who portrays the Goa'uld System Lord Ba'al in SG-1 after the pair were introduced to Simon at a convention. Script supervisor James Swallow assembled the writers room for the series, reenlisting Sally Malcolm and Sharon Gosling who had worked on the first two series, and bringing Peter J. Evans, Richard Dinnick and Steve Lyons onboard. The series would consist of two trilogies of episodes, with the intention that the stories be self-contained with an over-aching story to each trilogy. Spragg noted they had originally considered the series being a six-part story but ultimately decided against it "as nothing had lasted longer than three episodes on TV". Jason Haigh-Ellery directed Claudia Black and Cliff Simon's sessions in a studio in Los Angeles. Michael Shanks's parts were recorded in his native home of Vancouver, Canada, with directions given by Lisa Bowerman over Skype from Big Finish's London studio. Both part 1 and 2 are set during the events of season ten of Stargate SG-1. For the second trilogy, Michael Shanks was asked to not only play his character of Daniel Jackson, but also Thor, who he also voiced throughout the run of the television series.

== Cast and characters ==
=== Returning Stargate Cast and Reoccurring Actors ===
Actor	Character	Appearances																	
Actor	Character	Series 1						Series 2						Series 3					
Stargate characters from the television shows		1	2	3	4	5	6	1	2	3	4	5	6	1	2	3	4	5	6
Michael Shanks	Dr. Daniel Jackson	✓		✓										✓	✓	✓	✓	✓	✓
Christopher Judge	Teal'c							✓		✓									
Claudia Black	Vala Mal Doran			✓										✓	✓	✓	✓	✓	✓
Torri Higginson	Dr. Elizabeth Weir		✓																
Paul McGillion	Dr. Carson Beckett				✓						✓								
Cliff Simon	Ba'al													✓	✓	✓			
Teryl Rothery	Dr. Janet Fraiser					✓				✓									
David Nykl	Dr. Radek Zelenka						✓						✓						
Gary Jones	Walter Harriman											✓							
Kavan Smith	Evan Lorne								✓										
Original characters
John Schwab	John Hunter	✓													✓	✓			
Paul Hyu	Yin														✓	✓			✓
Andrew Collins	Keto													✓	✓	✓	✓	✓	✓
Stephen Hogan	Olson													✓	✓	✓		✓	
Susan Franklyn	Rix													✓	✓				
Andrew Whipp	Zoder															✓	✓		

=== Guests ===
Series 1

- Timothy Watson as Minister Vilith
- Sarah Douglas as Dr. Gilbert
- Toby Longworth as Luka Biass
- Ursula Burton as Helen Sharpe

Series 2

- Noel Clarke as Sebe't
- Beth Chalmers as Gina Roberts
- Nicholas Briggs as Dr. David Glennie
- Neil Roberts as Archus
- Aidan J. David as Argan Loci

== Releases ==
=== Series 1 (2008) ===
No.	Title	Directed by	Written by	Series	Featuring	Released
1	"Gift of the Gods"	Sharon Gosling	Sally Malcolm	SG-1	Michael Shanks, John Schwab	April 2008
2	"A Necessary Evil"	Sharon Gosling	Sharon Gosling	SGA	Torri Higginson, Timothy Watson	May 2008
3	"Shell Game"	Sharon Gosling	James Swallow	SG-1	Claudia Black, Michael Shanks	June 2008
4	"Perchance to Dream"	Sharon Gosling	Sally Malcolm	SGA	Paul McGillion, Sarah Douglas	July 2008
5	"Savarna"	Sharon Gosling	Sally Malcolm	SG-1	Teryl Rothery, Toby Longworth	August 2008
6	"Zero Point"	Sharon Gosling	James Swallow	SGA	David Nykl, Ursula Burton	September 2008

=== Series 2 (2009) ===
No.	Title	Directed by	Written by	Series	Featuring	Released
1	"First Prime"	Sharon Gosling	James Swallow	SG-1	Christopher Judge, Noel Clarke	May 2009
2	"Impressions"	Sharon Gosling	Scott K. Andrews	SGA	Kavan Smith, Nicholas Briggs	June 2009
3	"Pathogen"	Sharon Gosling	Sharon Gosling	SG-1	Teryl Rothery, Christopher Judge	July 2009
4	"The Kindness of Strangers"	Sharon Gosling	Sharon Gosling	SGA	Paul McGillion, Neil Roberts	August 2009
5	"Lines of Communication"	Richard Dolmat, Sharon Gosling	Luke Mansell	SG-1	Gary Jones, Beth Chalmers	September 2009
6	"Meltdown"	Sharon Gosling	David A. McIntee	SGA	David Nykl, Aidan J. David	October 2009

=== Series 3 (2012) ===
No.	Title	Directed by	Written by	Featuring	Released
Part 1
1	"Half-Life"	Lisa Bowerman & Jason Haigh-Ellery	James Swallow	Claudia Black, Michael Shanks, Cliff Simon	May 2012
2	"An Eye for an Eye"	Lisa Bowerman & Jason Haigh-Ellery	Sally Malcolm	Claudia Black, Michael Shanks, Cliff Simon	May 2012
3	"Infiltration"	Lisa Bowerman & Jason Haigh-Ellery	Steve Lyons	Claudia Black, Michael Shanks, Cliff Simon	May 2012
Part 2
4	"Excision"	Lisa Bowerman & Jason Haigh-Ellery	Peter J. Evans	Claudia Black, Michael Shanks	December 2012
5	"Duplicity"	Lisa Bowerman & Jason Haigh-Ellery	Richard Dinnick	Claudia Black, Michael Shanks	December 2012
6	"Time's Wheel"	Lisa Bowerman & Jason Haigh-Ellery	Sharon Gosling	Claudia Black, Michael Shanks	December 2012
