= Sally Malcolm =

Science fiction author

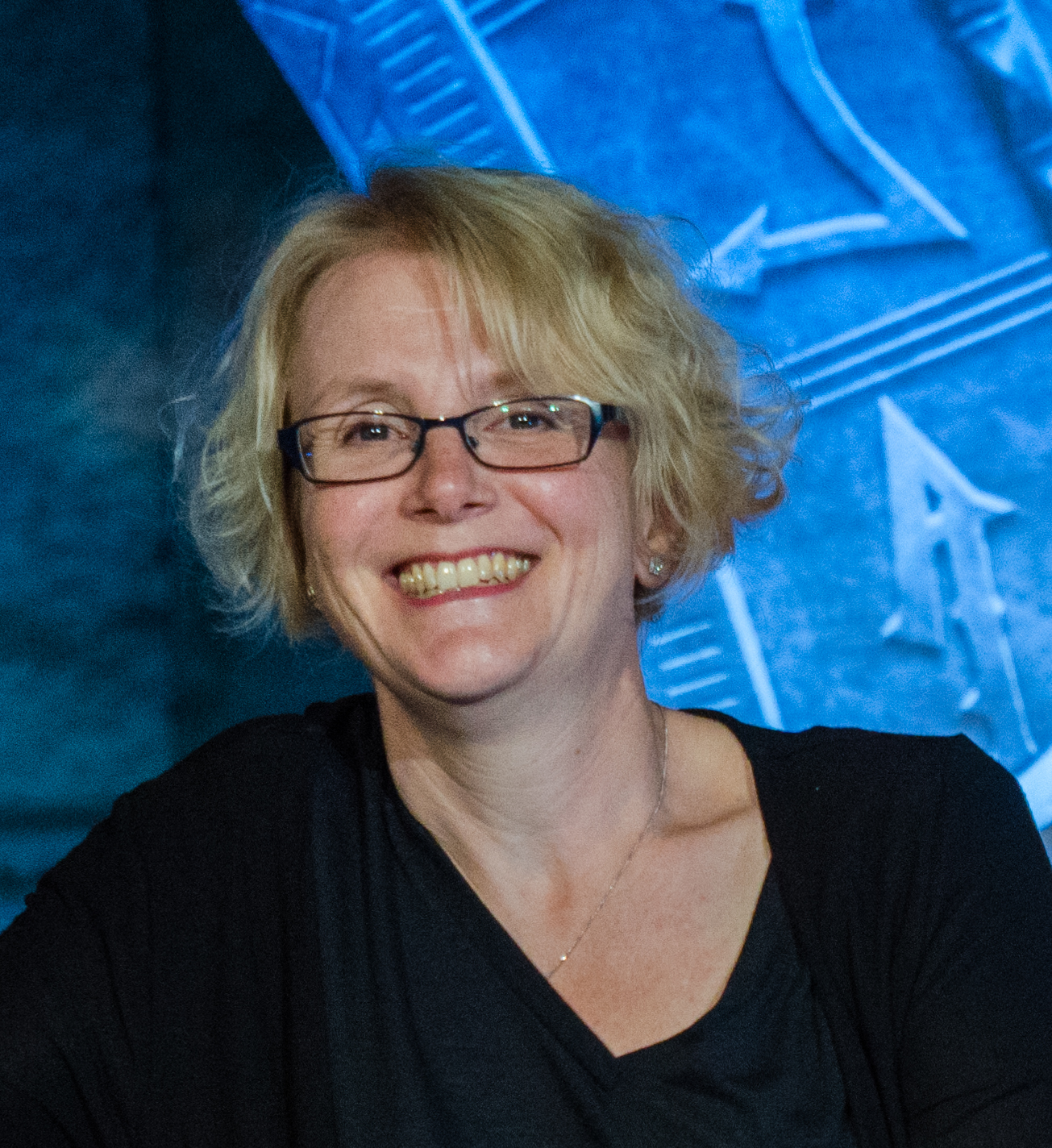
- Malcolm at Gatecon in 2016
- Occupations: Writer, Editor
- Writing career
- Genre: Science fiction

Sally Malcolm is a published science fiction author and joint owner and chief editor of the Fandemonium publishing company. She started as a fanfiction writer. She has written 3 books, all published by Fandemonium.

She wrote the Stargate SG-1 novels A Matter of Honor and The Cost of Honor which follow on from each other, and a novelisation of the pilot episode of Stargate Atlantis, Rising. In 2008, her first audiobook Stargate SG-1: Gift of the Gods was released.

In February 2012, she published The Legend of the Gypsy Hawk, a historical romance and her first non-Stargate title.
