= Stargate (film) =

1994 film by Roland Emmerich

- Theatrical release poster
- Directed by: Roland Emmerich
- Written by: Dean Devlin; Roland Emmerich
- Produced by: Joel B. Michaels; Oliver Eberle; Dean Devlin
- Starring: Kurt Russell; James Spader; Jaye Davidson; Viveca Lindfors
- Cinematography: Karl Walter Lindenlaub
- Edited by: Michael J. Duthie; Derek Brechin
- Music by: David Arnold
- Production companies: Le Studio Canal+; Centropolis Film Productions; Carolco Pictures, Inc.
- Distributed by: MGM/UA Distribution Co. (Note: Released through the Metro-Goldwyn-Mayer label.) (United States); AMLF (France)
- Release date: October 28, 1994 (United States)
- Running time: 121 minutes
- Countries: United States; France
- Language: English
- Budget: $55 million
- Box office: $196.6 million

Stargate is a 1994 science fiction action-adventure film directed by Roland Emmerich, written by Emmerich and Dean Devlin. The film is the first entry in the eponymous media franchise and stars Kurt Russell, James Spader, Jaye Davidson, Alexis Cruz, Mili Avital, and Viveca Lindfors. The plot centers on the "Stargate", an ancient ring-shaped device that creates a wormhole, enabling travel to a similar device elsewhere in the universe. The central plot explores the theory of extraterrestrial beings having an influence upon human civilization.

Stargate was released on October 28, 1994, by Metro-Goldwyn-Mayer in the United States, while it was released by AMLF in France. The film received mixed reviews, with its atmosphere, story, characters, and graphic content both praised and criticized. The film grossed $196.6 million worldwide against a production budget of $55 million.

== Plot ==
In 1928 at Giza, Egypt, archaeologist Professor Paul Langford, accompanied by his daughter Catherine, unearths cover stones engraved with Egyptian hieroglyphs and other markings. Beneath he discovers a large metallic ring of unknown purpose. On a table of artifacts pulled from the excavation, Catherine finds and pockets a gold amulet with symbols carved in it.

In 1994, the now-elderly Catherine invites Egyptologist and linguist Daniel Jackson, Ph.D. to translate the hieroglyphs. The stones, located underground at a military installation in Colorado, are now part of a classified U.S. Air Force project overseen by Special Operations Colonel Jack O'Neil. Jackson sees the existing research and translations of the hieroglyphs and corrects them. The stones describe a "stargate" which uses six star constellations as spatial coordinates and the symbol for Earth as the point of origin. Jackson is brought to see the Stargate, the ring device from Giza. They use his coordinates to align the Stargate's rotating inner track with V-shaped markings (or "chevrons") along its outside. When all seven chevrons are locked in, a wormhole opens, connecting the Stargate with a distant planet. A mechanical probe is sent through the stargate and manages to send back a few images showing different symbols on the ring on the other side of the portal before it closes. Catherine gives Jackson her amulet before he leaves with O'Neil and his team (Reilly, Porro, Freeman, Brown, Ferretti, and Kawalsky) to pass through the wormhole.

They emerge inside a temple at the base of a pyramid on an arid desert planet. Jackson searches for the symbols required for the return journey through the Stargate, but the pyramid complex lacks any visible markings. O'Neil orders Kawalsky to set up camp. Jackson sees a mastadge, a large animal with a harness, which drags him off when he approaches it to investigate. O'Neil, Kawalsky and Brown follow and they discover a tribe of humans working to mine a strange mineral, which Brown identifies as the same material the Stargate is made of. O'Neil radios the others to secure basecamp. Following them back to their city, Jackson realizes that the people speak a variant of Ancient Egyptian and is able to communicate with them. He learns that the tribe sees him and his comrades as emissaries of their god Ra because he is wearing Catherine's amulet. The tribe's chieftain Kasuf presents Jackson with his daughter Sha'uri as a gift, and although Jackson initially refuses her, he later becomes romantically attached to her. O'Neil befriends Kasuf's teenaged son Skaara and his friends. That night, Ra's ship arrives, causing a large sandstorm, and lands atop the pyramid structure. His soldiers capture Ferretti and Freeman while killing Porro and Reilly.

Jackson finds and translates hidden murals and hieroglyphs with help from Sha'uri and discussions with the tribe. He learns that Ra is an alien being who came to Earth during the Ancient Egyptian period to possess human bodies to extend his own life. Ra enslaved these humans and used the Stargate to bring some of them to the planet to mine the mineral that is used in the alien technology. Humans on Earth revolted, overthrew Ra's overseers, and buried the Stargate to prevent its use. During this investigation, Jackson comes across a cartouche containing six of the seven symbols needed to configure the Stargate for the return to Earth, but the seventh has been broken off and has worn away.

When Jackson, O'Neil, Brown, and Kawalsky return to the pyramid, there is a firefight against Ra's soldiers. Brown is killed and Kawalsky is injured. Jackson and O'Neil are captured and brought before Ra and his guards. They reveal their true human-like forms by retracting their head pieces: Ra's funerary mask styled headdress and the soldier's Anubis-shaped armored head pieces. A firefight ensues and Jackson is killed; O'Neil is incapacitated and is incarcerated with the others. Ra places Jackson's body in a sarcophagus-like device that regenerates him. Ra then shows Jackson a nuclear bomb which O'Neil had secretly brought with him. Perceiving their arrival with the bomb as an act of war, Ra declares his intentions to send it back through the Stargate to Earth, along with a shipment of the mineral, which will increase its explosive power a hundred fold—essentially creating a civilization-ending event. Ra then orders the human tribe to watch as he prepares to force Jackson to execute the others to reinforce his place and power as their god, but Skaara and his friends create a diversion that allows Jackson, O'Neil, Kawalsky, and Ferretti to escape, while Freeman is killed. They flee to nearby caves to hide from Ra. Skaara and his friends celebrate, and Skaara draws a sign of victory on a wall, which Jackson recognizes as the final symbol, the point of origin, needed for the return to Earth.

O'Neil and his remaining men aid Skaara in overthrowing the remaining overseers, wearing Horus-head armor, and then launch an attack on Ra, who sends out fighter ships to strafe the humans while he orders his ship to depart. The humans outside run out of ammunition and are forced to surrender to the fighter ships' pilots, but the rest of the tribe, seeing that their false gods are really humanoid, rebel against the guards and overthrow them. Sha'uri is killed, but Jackson takes her body and sneaks aboard Ra's ship using a teleportation system, leaving O'Neil to fight Ra's guard captain, Anubis. Jackson places Sha'uri in the regeneration device, and she recovers, but Ra discovers them and attempts to kill Jackson with telekinetic powers. O'Neil activates the teleportation system, killing Anubis and allowing Jackson and Sha'uri to escape the ship. The rest of the humans arrive en masse, and overrun the remaining guards, defeating them. When O'Neil realizes the bomb cannot be disarmed, he and Jackson teleport the bomb to Ra's ship, destroying the ship and killing Ra as he tries to escape. With the humans freed, the remaining team—O'Neil, Kawalsky, and Ferretti—return to Earth while Jackson chooses to stay behind with Sha'uri and the others.

== Cast ==
- Kurt Russell as Colonel Jonathan J. "Jack" O'Neil, a career U.S. Air Force Special Operations officer, who suffers a period of suicidal depression after his son accidentally shoots and kills himself with O'Neil's own pistol. When his commission is reactivated, he willingly enters the Stargate, fully aware that he will likely not survive to return to Earth. In real life, Kurt Russell served in the California Air National Guard and belonged to the 146th Tactical Airlift Wing, then based in Van Nuys. Russell turned down the role multiple times, until it was realized he was sent an early version of the script, so he was sent the completed shooting script and accepted it.
- James Spader as Dr. Daniel Jackson, an archaeologist and linguist whose theory that the pharaohs of the Fourth Dynasty did not build the Great Pyramid of Giza is not very widely accepted. Actor James Spader was intrigued by the script because he found it "awful", but, after meeting director Roland Emmerich, got excited about it for he "realized that making this picture was going to be such an adventure that out of that would come an adventure on screen."
- Jaye Davidson as Ra, a powerful alien in human form. After voyaging across the universe, searching for a new host that could sustain his dying body, Ra took the form of a curious adolescent boy and enslaved the people of his planet (Earth). Using a Stargate, he transported people from Earth to another planet until the humans on Earth rebelled and buried their Stargate. Reluctant to continue acting after his debut in The Crying Game, Davidson took the role after his request for $1 million in pay was accepted. Stargate was the final major film for Davidson, who subsequently retired from acting. Kairon John plays the masked Ra and Dax Biagas plays the young Ra.
- Viveca Lindfors as Dr. Catherine Langford, the civilian leader of the Stargate project who was present when the Stargate was uncovered in Giza in 1928, where her father gave her the amulet depicting the Eye of Ra. Stargate was Lindfors' penultimate film. Kelly Vint Castro portrays the young Catherine.
- Alexis Cruz as Skaara, the son of Kasuf and brother of Sha'uri. Skaara and his friends aid O'Neil and his men to fight Ra.
- Mili Avital as Sha'uri, the daughter of Kasuf. Kasuf offers Sha'uri to Daniel Jackson in marriage as a gift.
- Leon Rippy as Major General W. O. West, the commanding officer of the facility housing the Stargate device
- John Diehl as Lt. Colonel Charles Kawalsky, O'Neil's second-in-command
- Carlos Lauchu as Anubis, the captain of Ra's personal guard
- Djimon Hounsou as Horus, a personal guard of Ra
- Erick Avari as Kasuf, the local leader of the people living in a city near the Stargate, and the father of Sha'uri and Skaara
- French Stewart as Lt. Louis Ferretti, a member of O'Neil's team
- Christopher John Fields as Lt. Freeman, a member of O'Neil's team
- Derek Webster as Senior Airman Brown, a member of O'Neil's team
- Jack Moore as Senior Airman Reilly, a member of O'Neil's team
- Steve Giannelli as Lt. Porro, a member of O'Neil's team
- Rae Allen as Dr. Barbara Shore, a researcher studying the Stargate
- Richard Kind as Dr. Gary Meyers, a researcher studying the Stargate

== Production ==
Hieroglyphic script on the coverstone and its chalkboard translation

(including original translation and later modification by Daniel Jackson)

r n p rnp t Z2 I8 V20 r q b H w W15 N1 N25 p w r a C1 m i t n N8

~~time~~ year million sky Ra sun god

m x m t S20 Aa18 n f q r s T19 A24 Q6 A55 f n D&t tA r G21 H H ra N23

sealed + buried ~~coffin~~ ~~forever to eternity~~ for all time

s sbA b O32 n Z2 s b A sbA ra Z2 f

his ~~door to heaven~~ stargate

literal translation of the text:

years million in sky this Ra as Aten (=sun disk)
sealed buried enduringly and repeatedly
door his to stars

Jackson's final translation:

million years into the sky is Ra Sun God
sealed and buried for all time
his Stargate

=== Development ===
The film in its original cut and in the director's cut plays out in chronological order. When Devlin and Emmerich edited the film in the director's cut to tighten the narrative, they decided to add a scene at the very beginning of the film to show who the human host of Ra was before the aliens took him. Only Davidson's upper torso was filmed. The first scene was a combination of model shots and a set in Yuma, Arizona where Rambo III had been filmed. The scene of the excavation of the Stargate was also filmed in three days in Arizona. A golden look was achieved by filming near sunset. To keep within the budget, the producers put stick figures with cloth in the distant desert to appear as humans. The original Stargate was painted black, but it looked like a giant tire so it was repainted silver at the last moment.

Daniel Jackson's lecture on his theories was filmed in a hotel in Los Angeles. The scene was originally much longer and delved more into the theories that aliens had built the Egyptian pyramids, but it was trimmed for time concerns for the release. The scenes with O'Neil at his house were the first ones filmed with Kurt Russell; his hair was cut short afterwards. Russell requested his hair color to be brightened a little for the film. The fictional facility housing the Stargate was the largest set for the film, the former Spruce Goose Dome located in Long Beach, California. Egyptologist Stuart Tyson Smith joined the production to make all Ancient Egyptian hieroglyphics and spoken language as accurate as possible.

=== Filming ===
The mask of the pharaoh in the opening credits was made out of fiberglass and modeled in the workshop. The sequence used a motion-control camera to give better depth of field. The score of Stargate was composer David Arnold's first work on an American feature film. When Devlin and Emmerich first flew to London to meet with Arnold, they had not yet heard the score; hearing it, they felt "he had elevated the film to a whole other level". Arnold later interviewed the actors during principal photography, using the information to improve his score.

=== Visual effects ===
Jeff Kleiser and Kleiser-Walczak Construction Co.'s visual effects team of 40 people created the look of the Stargate. They used self-written image-creation and compositing software, as well as commercial digital packages to create the Stargate, the morphing helmets worn by Ra and the Horus guards, and the cityscape of Nagada. The morphing helmets were not true 3D but 2D elements, as Kleiser explained: "You shoot the character without the headdress, you shoot the character with a headdress. And then you have to go in and, and create all these little sections that you would then wipe off to reveal—and it had to match up, the two things had to match up. I think the cameras were moving as well."

Footprints in the sand were often digitally removed. The creation of the wormhole, which was fully digital, was one of the biggest challenges in the making of the film. The ripples had to be digitally composited to appear accurate and realistic. Scanning lasers were lined up parallel to the gate to illustrate the amount of body that passed the surface of the Stargate plane. Afterwards, the parts of the body that had or had not yet gone through the gate (depending on the side of filming) were obliterated with a digital matte, a process that removes unwanted components from an individual frame or sequence of frames. The funnel of water that precedes the Stargate opening was filmed by discharging an air cannon into a water tank, as Jeff Kleiser explained: "We didn't know how much air pressure to set the cannon on but it went from 1 to 500 lb, so we said 'Let's try 100—start the camera rolling and hit the thing.' It evacuated all the water out of the tank and onto the camera and everybody. It turned out that 1 lb was about the right amount."

The use of computers generating a big 3D storyboard allowed Emmerich to try out different shooting angles before settling on one angle.

== Music ==
The film's score was composed by David Arnold, played by the Sinfonia of London and conducted by Nicholas Dodd. It was the second motion picture score that Arnold had composed and his first for a major motion picture. At the time of production, Arnold had recently started to work in a local video store in London. Once hired, he spent several months in a hotel room working on the soundtrack, spending more time rewriting the music and improving it, during delays due to film companies trying to get the rights to distribution. According to Arnold, "when I first read the script for Stargate, I knew what approach to take, which was to be as big and bold as possible," saying: "Every time there was an amazing sight, the characters would stand back and say, 'Oh my God!' But James would just smile and walk towards it. That was the basis for the Stargate score, moving forward with a sense of majesty instead of being frightened by what's around the corner."

== Release ==
=== Theatrical ===
Stargate was released in the United States and Canada on October 28, 1994.

=== Home media ===
In 1995, the film was released on VHS and as a Dolby Digital-encoded LaserDisc spanning two discs (three sides). The first DVD release was on June 18, 1997. The DVD format was re-released in October 1999 under the title Stargate Special Edition, and again in 2003 on VHS and a 2-disc DVD set with remastered theatrical and extended editions. The film was released on Blu-ray format on August 29, 2006.

=== Lawsuit ===
In January 1995, Omar Zuhdi, a high school teacher, filed a lawsuit against the makers and originators of the original movie, claiming that they stole the plot and story of his 1984 film script Egyptscape, as the basis of the film Stargate (and thus the Stargate franchise). The suit was later settled out of court.

=== Director's cut ===
The director's cut had several scenes which were cut from the theatrical release. This version begins with a short scene showing the abduction of the human that is possessed by Ra. The second added scene took place immediately after the excavation of the Stargate in 1928 and showed a petrified Anubis guard underneath a broken cover stone. With this scene, the producers had tried to introduce the idea that beings had attempted to come through the Stargate after its burial but the scene was ultimately cut for time concerns.

== Reception ==
=== Box office ===
The film received a warm reception from the public, grossing $71,567,262 at the United States box office and $125 million internationally for a worldwide total of $196,567,262. At the time, the film set a record for the highest-grossing opening weekend for a film released in the month of October. It would hold this record for four years until 1998 when Antz took it.

In its first run, Stargate made more money than film industry insiders predicted, considering the lukewarm reviews. Some regard it as Emmerich's breakthrough film. Stargate grossed over $16,651,000 in the United States during its opening week in October 1994. It was the 35th-highest-grossing film opening in the U.S. in October. From November 4–6, the film grossed around $12,368,700, declining 25%. It topped the box office for two weeks until it was dethroned by Interview with the Vampire. The film would continue this decline until the end of November, when the film garnered $4,777,198, or an 8.2% rise. The week before that the film garnered around $4,413,420, a 45.6% decline. In its last week playing theatrically, the film garnered around $1,170,500 in the U.S.

=== Critical response ===
On Rotten Tomatoes, the film has an approval rating of 53% based on 51 reviews, and an average rating of 5.4/10. The site's critics consensus states: "Stargate has splashy visuals and James Spader to recommend it, but corny characterization and a clunky script makes this a portal to ho-hum." On Metacritic, the film has a weighted average score of 42 out of 100, based on 17 critics, indicating "mixed or average reviews". At Movie Review Query Engine (MRQE), which assigns a normalized rating to mainstream critics, the film holds a score of 64 out of 100 based on 95 reviews. Audiences polled by CinemaScore gave the film an average grade of "B+" on an A+ to F scale.

Most of the negativity focused on what was criticized as overuse of special effects, thinness of plot, and excessive use of clichés. Roger Ebert went so far as to say, "The movie Ed Wood, about the worst director of all time, was made to prepare us for Stargate". Ebert awarded the film one out of four stars and, even over 10 years later, Stargate remained on his list of most-hated films. Mike DiBella from Allmovie said, "There simply isn't enough spectacle in Stargate to make up for its many flaws." The film peaked at number one on the Billboard chart Top Video Rentals on April 29, 1995.

The positive reviews stated that it was an "instant camp classic" and praised the film for its special effects and entertainment value, with Chris Hicks of the Deseret News calling it "Star Wars meets Ben Hur". Scott McKenzie from DVDactive said, "It's a shame because the world created around the Stargate is compelling and detailed. It's almost enough to make me want to watch the TV series, but not quite."

=== Accolades ===
In 1995, Stargate was considered for various film awards worldwide. It won six of the ten awards it was nominated for.

Award	Category	Recipients	Result
Academy of Science Fiction, Fantasy and Horror Films	Saturn Award for Best Science Fiction Film	Stargate	Won
Academy of Science Fiction, Fantasy and Horror Films	Saturn Award for Best Costume Design	Joseph A. Porro	Nominated
Academy of Science Fiction, Fantasy and Horror Films	Saturn Award for Best Special Effects	Jeffrey A. Okun and Patrick Tatopoulos	Nominated
BMI Film & TV Awards	BMI Film Music Award	David Arnold	Won
Fantasporto	International Fantasy Film Award for Best Film	Roland Emmerich	Nominated
Germany's Golden Screen Awards	Golden Screen	Stargate	Won
Hugo Award	Hugo Award for Best Dramatic Presentation	Stargate	Nominated
Sci-Fi Universe Magazine: Universe Reader's Choice Awards	Best Science Fiction Film	Stargate	Won
Sci-Fi Universe Magazine: Universe Reader's Choice Awards	Best Special Effects in a Genre Motion Picture	Jeffrey A. Okun	Won
Sci-Fi Universe Magazine: Universe Reader's Choice Awards	Best Supporting Actress in a Genre Motion Picture	Mili Avital	Won

== Other media ==
=== Video games ===
Two video games based on the film were published by Acclaim Entertainment: a 1995 side-scrolling platform game for the Super Nintendo Entertainment System and Sega Genesis, and a Tetris-like puzzle video game for the Game Gear and Game Boy.

=== Cancelled film sequels ===
Devlin and Emmerich always envisioned Stargate as the first part of a trilogy of films, but Parts 2 and 3 were never developed. At Comic-Con 2006, twelve years after the original film was released, Devlin stated that he was in early discussions with rights-holders MGM about finally bringing the final two parts to the screen.

According to Devlin, the second film is intended to be set around twelve years after the original, with Jackson making a discovery that leads him back to Earth and to the uncovering of a new Stargate. The second entry would supposedly use a different mythology from the Egyptian one which formed the background to the original film, with the third installment tying these together to reveal that "all mythologies are actually tied together with a common thread that we haven't recognized before." Devlin stated that he hoped to enlist original stars Kurt Russell (Col. Jack O'Neil) and James Spader (Dr. Daniel Jackson) for the sequels. The actors reportedly expressed an interest in participating in the project.

The film trilogy would not directly tie into the series Stargate SG-1. According to Devlin, the relationship between the movie and the series is "we would just continue the mythology of the movie and finish that out. I think the series could still live on at the end of the third sequel. So we're going to try to not tread on their stories." Plans for sequels to the original film are unrelated to the development of straight-to-DVD films made as sequels to Stargate SG-1. According to Devlin, he and Emmerich had always planned to do three films with the potential for more, but MGM preferred to play out the television series first.

=== Novel series ===
Using some of Emmerich's notes, Bill McCay wrote a series of five novels, continuing the story the original creators had envisioned, which involved the Earth-humans, the locals and the successors of Ra.

=== Television spin-offs ===
The CD-ROM programme Secrets of Stargate, released after the film, showed how the special effects were made, and included behind-the-scenes of the film and the showing of interviews with the cast and the production members. Dean Devlin eventually gave Metro-Goldwyn-Mayer (MGM) the rights over the film. In 1996, MGM hired Brad Wright and Jonathan Glassner to create a spin-off television series. Stargate SG-1 premiered on the American subscription channel Showtime on July 27, 1997 and ended its ten-season run in 2007. Stargate SG-1 itself spawned the non-canon animated television series Stargate Infinity (2002–03), and the live-action television series Stargate Atlantis (2004–09) and Stargate Universe (2009–11).

==== Differences from film to television franchise ====
Concept drawing of Ra's original humanoid form by Patrick Tatopoulos

SG-1 creators and executive producers Brad Wright and Jonathan Glassner altered the canon by introducing several new concepts during production of the SG-1 and Atlantis series. In the television series, characters were portrayed by different actors, and names were spelled differently. Daniel Jackson was played by James Spader in the film and by Michael Shanks in the series. Kurt Russell's character Jonathan "Jack" O'Neil, a rather humorless Colonel, is played by Richard Dean Anderson as Jonathan "Jack" O'Neill (with two 'l's) in SG-1. French Stewart's character was Lieutenant Louis Ferretti but in SG-1, played by Brent Stait, he is a Major. The spelling of Daniel Jackson's wife changes from "Sha'uri" to "Sha're", O'Neill's wife from Sarah to Sara. (Similarly, the name of O'Neil's son changes from "Tyler" in the film to "Charlie".)

The Stargate Command setting was transferred from the fictional military facility located in Creek Mountain, to the Cheyenne Mountain military complex. The unnamed planet from the film was named Abydos in the series and the distance from Earth changed from millions of light-years away (in an entirely different galaxy, "the Kalium galaxy") to becoming the closest planet to Earth with a Stargate, residing in the same galaxy as Earth. Also in SG-1, Stargate travel is limited to the Stargate network in the Milky Way galaxy (unless a tremendous amount of power is used to lengthen the subspace wormhole of a Stargate to another galaxy's Stargate). Ra was the last of an unnamed race in the film, being of a humanoid species with large black eyes and a lack of facial features. In SG-1, Ra is one of many "Goa'uld System Lords", a race of parasitic eel-like creatures.

There were also changes to the Stargate. The unique set of 39 Stargate symbols in the film was replaced with the concept of 38 symbols that are the same for each Stargate (Earth's symbols based on Earth's constellations), plus a single point of origin symbol that is unique to that individual gate. While the kawoosh effect in the movie was created by filming the actual swirl of water in a glass tube, and looked like a vortex on the back of the Gate, on the television series this effect was completely created in computer graphics by the Canadian visual effects company Rainmaker.

At the beginning of SG-1 season 9, the original wormhole-traversal sequence used in the film, and in the series up to that point, was replaced with a new sequence similar to the one already used on Stargate Atlantis, but blue as it was in the movie and SG-1. In Atlantis, it is green, and in Universe, it is white.

=== Reboot ===
On September 5, 2013, during an interview with Digital Spy, Emmerich said that he and MGM are planning a new Stargate as a reboot with a trilogy. On May 29, 2014, it was announced that MGM and Warner Bros. would partner together for a trilogy film series reboot with Emmerich directing, Devlin producing, and Nicolas Wright and James A. Woods writing. On November 17, 2016, Devlin told Empire Online that the plans to make a reboot and a potential new series are stalled. On April 14, 2023, it was announced that MGM were rebooting their film franchises for film and television, including Stargate.

== See also ==
- Stargate
- Pyramids of Mars, a Doctor Who serial
- "The Wall", an episode of the 1985 revival of The Twilight Zone
- White savior narrative in film, a cinematic trope studied in sociology, for which Stargate has been analyzed
