= Ashley McConnell =

American writer

Ashley McConnell is an American author. Her first novel, Unearthed, was a finalist for the Bram Stoker Award from the Horror Writers of America. In addition to horror, she has published numerous fantasy and media tie-in novels, including several for the television shows Quantum Leap, Buffy the Vampire Slayer and Stargate SG-1, and several short stories.

== Works ==
- Unearthed (1991)
- Days of the Dead (1992)

=== Demon Wars series ===
- Demon Wars #1 "The Fountains of Mirlacca" (1995)
- Demon Wars #2 "The Itinerant Exorcist" (1996)
- Demon Wars #3 "The Courts of Sorcery" (1996)

=== Quantum Leap series ===
- Quantum Leap #1 Quantum Leap: The Novel (1992) aka "Carny Knowledge"
- Quantum Leap #2 Too Close for Comfort (1993)
- Quantum Leap #3 The Wall (1993)
- Quantum Leap #4 Prelude (1994)
- Quantum Leap #7 Random Measures (1994)

=== Highlander series ===
- Highlander #2 "Scimitar" (1996)

=== Stargate SG-1 series ===
- Stargate SG-1 #2 "The Price You Pay" (1999)
- Stargate SG-1 #3 "The First Amendment" (2000)
- Stargate SG-1 #4 "The Morpheus Factor" (2001)

=== Buffyverse ===
- Buffy - These Our Actors (2002) (with Dori Koogler)
- Angel - Book of the Dead (2004)
