= Bill McCay =

American novelist

- Born: April 6, 1951 (age 75); New York City, U.S.
- Occupation: Writer
- Writing career
- Period: 1991–present
- Genre: near future

Bill McCay (born April 6, 1951) is an American author and has written over seventy books in total, mostly media tie-ins.

== Series Contributions ==
=== Raven League (With Alex Simmons) ===
McCay co-wrote two novels in the Raven League series with Alex Simmons:

- Buffalo Bill Wanted! (2006)
- Sherlock Holmes Is Missing! (2007)

=== Mage Knight ===
McCay contributed the first novel in the Mage Knight wargaming tie-in:

- Rebel Thunder (2003)

=== Tom Clancy's Net Force Explorers ===
McCay contributed several novels in the Tom Clancy's Net Force Explorers series:

- Cyberspy (1999) with Tom Clancy and Steve R. Pieczenik
- The Great Race (1999)
- Private Lives (2000)
- Duel Identity (2000)
- Cold Case (2001)

=== Nintendo Adventure Books ===
McCay contributed two books to the Nintendo Adventure Books series:

- Monster Mix-Up (1991)
- Koopa Capers (1991)

=== Stan Lee's Riftworld ===
- Crossover (1993)
- Villains (1994)
- Odyssey (1996) with Stan Lee

=== Star Trek Universe ===
- Chains of Command (1992) with Eloise Flood

=== Stargate ===
Continuation of the original film.

- Rebellion (1995)
- Retaliation (1996)
- Retribution (1997)
- Reconnaissance (1998)
- Resistance (1999)

=== Tom Swift ===
McCay contributed four books to the Tom Swift series, writing under both house pseudonyms Victor Appleton and Franklin W. Dixon.

- The Black Dragon (1991) [as by Victor Appleton]
- The Negative Zone (1991) [as by Victor Appleton]'
- Time Bomb (1992) (A Hardy Boys & Tom Swift Ultra Thriller as Franklin W. Dixon)
- The Alien Factor (1992) (A Hardy Boys & Tom Swift Ultra Thriller as Franklin W. Dixon)
