= List of Sanctuary episodes =

Sanctuary is a Canadian science fiction-fantasy television series created by Damian Kindler. It premiered on Syfy on October 3, 2008. Kindler originally created Sanctuary as an eight-part web series, but later it was adapted for television. The series is set in the fictional city of Old City and follows centuries-old scientist Helen Magnus and her team: daughter Ashley; protégé Will Zimmerman; computer tech and Lycan Henry Foss; an aptly named "Bigfoot"; and con artist Kate Freelander. The Sanctuary team assumes the mission of tracking "Abnormals" (specially gifted humans and creatures), and bringing them to the Sanctuary for the dual purpose of protecting the public as well as the Abnormals themselves.

== Series overview ==
Season	Episodes	Originally released	
Season	Episodes	First released	Last released
W	8	March 14, 2007	August 30, 2007
1	13	October 3, 2008	January 5, 2009
2	13	October 9, 2009	January 15, 2010
3	20	October 15, 2010	June 20, 2011
4	13	October 7, 2011	December 30, 2011

== Webisodes (2007) ==
#	Title	Directed by	Written by	Original release date
W.1	"Webisode 1"	Martin Wood	Damian Kindler	May 14, 2007
While tracking a young boy with dangerous powers, Dr. Helen Magnus (Amanda Tapping) encounters Will Zimmerman (Robin Dunne), a psychiatric resident who may have what it takes to become her new protege...
W.2	"Webisode 2"	Martin Wood	Damian Kindler	May 28, 2007
Will Zimmerman is drawn further into Magnus's mysterious world and finds himself confronting his oldest fear. Elsewhere, forces converge on the target of their hunt – including someone from Magnus's distant past.
W.3	"Webisode 3"	Martin Wood	Damian Kindler	June 9, 2007
The origins of the mysterious mutant boy are revealed, as is the relationship between Magnus and her old flame, John Druitt. Ashley meanwhile seeks out Ernie Watts – weapons dealer and fellow monster hunter extraordinaire – only to find herself in mortal danger.
W.4	"Webisode 4"	Martin Wood	Damian Kindler	June 23, 2007
Magnus and Will confront a determined John Druitt – with tragic results for a member of the Sanctuary team. Ultimately, Will is forced to choose between his old life and the strange world of Dr. Helen Magnus.
W.5	"Webisode 5"	Martin Wood	Damian Kindler	July 14, 2007
While investigating an ancient crypt on a remote island, Magnus and her team encounter deadly creatures and three women with a mysterious past. Ashley decides to address the issue of her father's existence head-on.
W.6	"Webisode 6"	Martin Wood	Damian Kindler	July 28, 2007
The investigation into the three women found in the crypt continues, confirming Magnus's theory that they are much more than they appear. Ashley's hunt for contraband creatures yields mixed results.
W.7	"Webisode 7"	Martin Wood	Damian Kindler	August 15, 2007
Will falls victim to the three women's growing powers, while Magnus seeks proof of their true identities via a former resident of the Sanctuary. Ashley's luck in her monster hunt begins to run out... .
W.8	"Webisode 8"	Martin Wood	Damian Kindler	August 30, 2007
Magnus, Will and Bigfoot defend the Sanctuary against a deadly assault, while Ashley struggles to survive her encounter with a nearly unbeatable foe. The last webisode ends in a cliffhanger which is only resolved in the TV series episode Fata Morgana.

== Television ==
=== Season 1 (2008–09) ===
No. overall	No. in season	Title	Directed by	Written by	Original release date	US viewers (millions)
1	1	"Sanctuary for All (Part 1)"	Martin Wood	Story by : Damian Kindler; Teleplay by : Sam Egan & Damian Kindler	October 3, 2008	2.70
2	2	"Sanctuary for All (Part 2)"	Martin Wood	Story by : Damian Kindler; Teleplay by : Sam Egan & Damian Kindler	October 3, 2008	2.70
3	3	"Fata Morgana"	Martin Wood	Story by : Damian Kindler & Martin Wood; Teleplay by : Damian Kindler	October 10, 2008	N/A (Note: Though there are no known viewer ratings thus far, "Fata Morgana" achieved a household rating of 1.6, according to ISN News.net)
4	4	"Folding Man"	James Head	Sam Egan	October 17, 2008	N/A (Note: Though there are no known viewer ratings thus far, "Folding Man" achieved a household rating of 1.6, according to ISN News.net)
5	5	"Kush"	Martin Wood	Damian Kindler	October 24, 2008	N/A (Note: Though there are no known viewer ratings thus far, "Kush" achieved a household rating of 1.4, according to ISN News.net)
6	6	"Nubbins"	Peter DeLuise	Sam Egan	November 7, 2008	N/A (Note: Though there are no known viewer ratings thus far, "Nubbins" achieved a household rating of 1.5, according to ISN News.net)
7	7	"The Five"	Martin Wood	Damian Kindler	November 14, 2008	N/A (Note: Though there are no known viewer ratings thus far, "The Five" achieved a household rating of 1.5, according to ISN News.net)
8	8	"Edward"	Brenton Spencer	Sam Egan	November 21, 2008	1.75
9	9	"Requiem"	Martin Wood	Damian Kindler	December 5, 2008	1.54
10	10	"Warriors"	Brenton Spencer	Story by : Peter Mohan; Teleplay by : Sam Egan	December 12, 2008	1.70
11	11	"Instinct"	Steven A. Adelson	Damian Kindler	December 19, 2008	1.52
12	12	"Revelations (Part 1)"	Martin Wood	Story by : Sam Egan & Damian Kindler; Teleplay by : Sam Egan	December 29, 2008 (Note: The episode originally aired on ITV4 on December 29, 2008; The Sci Fi Channel aired the episode later, on January 2, 2009)	1.85
13	13	"Revelations (Part 2)"	Martin Wood	Story by : Sam Egan & Damian Kindler; Teleplay by : Damian Kindler	January 5, 2009 (Note: The episode originally aired on ITV4 on January 5, 2009; The Sci Fi Channel aired the episode later, on January 9, 2009)	2.00

=== Season 2 (2009–10) ===
No. overall	No. in season	Title	Directed by	Written by	Original release date	US viewers (millions)
14	1	"End of Nights (Part 1)"	Martin Wood	Damian Kindler	October 9, 2009	1.85
15	2	"End of Nights (Part 2)"	Martin Wood	Damian Kindler	October 16, 2009	1.77
16	3	"Eulogy"	Brenton Spencer	Sara B. Cooper	October 23, 2009	1.69
17	4	"Hero"	Martin Wood	Alan McCullough	October 30, 2009	1.61
18	5	"Pavor Nocturnus"	Brenton Spencer	Damian Kindler & James Thorpe	November 6, 2009	1.42
19	6	"Fragments"	Steven A. Adelson	Sara B. Cooper	November 13, 2009	1.66
20	7	"Veritas"	Amanda Tapping	Alan McCullough	November 20, 2009	1.44
21	8	"Next Tuesday"	Martin Wood	Damian Kindler	December 4, 2009	1.33
22	9	"Penance"	Brenton Spencer	Alan McCullough	December 11, 2009	1.36
23	10	"Sleepers"	Steven A. Adelson	James Thorpe	December 18, 2009	1.38
24	11	"Haunted"	Peter DeLuise	Damian Kindler & James Thorpe	January 8, 2010	N/A
25	12	"Kali (Part 1)"	Martin Wood	Alan McCullough	January 15, 2010	1.49
26	13	"Kali (Part 2)"	Martin Wood	Damian Kindler	January 15, 2010	1.49

=== Season 3 (2010–11) ===
No. overall	No. in season	Title	Directed by	Written by	Original release date	US viewers (millions)
27	1	"Kali (Part 3)"	Martin Wood	Alan McCullough	October 15, 2010	1.79
28	2	"Firewall"	Martin Wood	Damian Kindler	October 22, 2010	1.38
29	3	"Bank Job"	Peter DeLuise	James Thorpe	October 29, 2010	1.48
30	4	"Trail of Blood"	Steven A. Adelson	Gillian Horvath	November 5, 2010	1.26
31	5	"Hero II: Broken Arrow"	Mairzee Almas	Alan McCullough	November 12, 2010	1.57
32	6	"Animus"	Martin Wood	Miranda Kwok	November 19, 2010	1.26
33	7	"Breach"	Martin Wood	Damian Kindler	November 26, 2010	1.48
34	8	"For King and Country"	Lee Wilson	James Thorpe	December 3, 2010	1.47
35	9	"Vigilante"	Steven A. Adelson	Alan McCullough	December 10, 2010	1.41
36	10	"The Hollow Men"	Martin Wood	James Thorpe	December 17, 2010	1.47
37	11	"Pax Romana"	Martin Wood	Damian Kindler	April 15, 2011	1.22
38	12	"Hangover"	Andy Mikita	James Thorpe	April 22, 2011	1.42
39	13	"One Night"	Amanda Tapping	Damian Kindler	April 25, 2011	0.87
40	14	"Metamorphosis"	Andy Mikita	Alan McCullough	May 2, 2011	0.84
41	15	"Wingman"	Peter DeLuise	Miranda Kwok	May 9, 2011	0.76
42	16	"Awakening"	Lee Wilson	Gillian Horvath	May 16, 2011	0.82
43	17	"Normandy"	Martin Wood	Damian Kindler	May 23, 2011	0.66
44	18	"Carentan"	Steven A. Adelson	James Thorpe	June 6, 2011	0.92
45	19	"Out of the Blue"	Martin Wood	Damian Kindler	June 13, 2011	1.20
46	20	"Into the Black"	Damian Kindler	Alan McCullough	June 20, 2011	1.28

=== Season 4 (2011) ===
No. overall	No. in season	Title	Directed by	Written by	Original release date	US viewers (millions)
47	1	"Tempus"	Martin Wood	Damian Kindler	October 7, 2011	1.38
48	2	"Uprising"	Amanda Tapping	James Thorpe	October 14, 2011	1.32
49	3	"Untouchable"	Steven A. Adelson	Gillian Horvath	October 21, 2011	1.47
50	4	"Monsoon"	Martin Wood	Damian Kindler	October 28, 2011	1.20
51	5	"Resistance"	Lee Wilson	Alan McCullough	November 4, 2011	1.26
52	6	"Homecoming"	Robin Dunne	Damian Kindler & James Thorpe	November 11, 2011	1.32
53	7	"Icebreaker"	Martin Wood	Martin Wood	November 18, 2011	1.20
54	8	"Fugue"	Damian Kindler	Damian Kindler	November 25, 2011	1.11
55	9	"Chimera"	Martin Wood	James Thorpe	November 29, 2011	0.96
56	10	"Acolyte"	Lee Wilson	Alan McCullough	December 9, 2011	1.51
57	11	"The Depths"	Martin Wood	Gillian Horvath	December 16, 2011	1.28
58	12	"Sanctuary for None (Part 1)"	Damian Kindler	James Thorpe	December 23, 2011	1.12
59	13	"Sanctuary for None (Part 2)"	Damian Kindler	Damian Kindler	December 30, 2011	1.29

== Home media release ==
Season	DVD release date			Blu-ray release date
Season	Region 1	Region 2	Region 4	Blu-ray release date
W	September 15, 2009	October 12, 2009	September 9, 2009	June 15, 2010
1	September 15, 2009	October 12, 2009	September 9, 2009	June 15, 2010
2	June 15, 2010	October 4, 2010	June 9, 2010	June 15, 2010
3	September 13, 2011	September 26, 2011	September 14, 2011	September 13, 2011
4	July 17, 2012	July 2, 2012	—N/a	July 17, 2012
