= List of awards and nominations received by Sanctuary =

Awards and nominations for Sanctuary
Awards & Nominations
Award	Won	Nominated
Directors Guild of Canada Award	0	1
Emmy Award	0	1
Gemini Award	1	6
Leo Award	11	44
- Total number of wins and nominations
Totals	12	50
- Footnotes

Sanctuary is a Canadian science fantasy television series created by Damian Kindler. The show aired on Syfy between 2008 and 2011, for four seasons and a total of 59 episodes. During its run, the show received considerable attention for its use of cutting edge technology that was still rare for television at the time, particularly its embrace of fully virtual special effects. Kindler also received attention for his pioneering embrace of the Internet to distribute and market television prior to the advent and widespread popularity of streaming by making webisodes. The show received a variety of nomination and awards throughout its broadcast, including an Emmy for visual effects. In 2008, Guinness World Records awarded Kindler the then-record for the Highest Budget for a Direct-to-Web Broadcast.

== Awards and nominations ==
Award	Year	Category	Nominee(s)	Result	Ref
Primetime Emmy Awards	2009	Outstanding Visual Effects for a Series	Lee Wilson	Nominated	
Guinness World Records	2008	Highest Budget for a Direct-to-Web Broadcast	Sanctuary	Won	
Leo Awards	2009	Best Visual Effects in a Dramatic Series	Lee Wilson, Caleb Ashmore, Matthew Belbin, Sebastien Bergeron, Ken Lee, Lionel Lim, Mladen Miholjcic, Les Quinn, Lisa Sepp-Wilson, Philippe Thibault	Nominated	
Leo Awards	2009	Best Supporting Performance by a Male in a Dramatic Series	Christopher Heyerdahl	Nominated	
Leo Awards	2009	Best Screenwriting in a Dramatic Series	Sam Egan	Nominated	
Leo Awards	2009	Best Picture Editing in a Dramatic Series	Gordon Rempel	Nominated	
Leo Awards	2009	Best Makeup in a Dramatic Series	Todd Masters, Nicholas Podbrey, Sarah Pickersgill, Harlow MacFarlane	Won	
Leo Awards	2009	Best Lead Performance by a Female in a Dramatic Series	Amanda Tapping	Won	
Leo Awards	2009	Best Guest Performance by a Male in a Dramatic Series	Jonathan Yeong	Nominated	
Leo Awards	2009	Best Guest Performance by a Male in a Dramatic Series	Ryan Robbins	Won	
Leo Awards	2009	Best Guest Performance by a Female in a Dramatic Series	Gabrielle Rose	Won	
Leo Awards	2009	Best Direction in a Dramatic Series	Steven A. Adelson	Nominated	
Leo Awards	2010	Best Screenwriting in a Dramatic Series	Damian Kindler	Nominated	
Leo Awards	2010	Best Screenwriting in a Dramatic Series	Alan McCullough	Nominated	
Leo Awards	2010	Best Lead Performance by a Female in a Dramatic Series	Amanda Tapping	Nominated	
Leo Awards	2010	Best Supporting Performance by a Male in a Dramatic Series	Ryan Robbins	Nominated	
Leo Awards	2010	Best Guest Performance by a Male in a Dramatic Series	Michael Shanks	Nominated	
Leo Awards	2010	Best Visual Effects in a Dramatic Series	Lee Wilson, Caleb Ashmore, Matthew Belbin, Sebastien Bergeron, Ken Lee, Lionel Lim, Mladen Miholjcic, Les Quinn, Lisa Sepp-Wilson, Philippe Thibault	Nominated	
Leo Awards	2010	Best Makeup in a Dramatic Series	Francesca von Zimmurman, Andrea Manchur	Nominated	
Leo Awards	2010	Best Picture Editing in a Dramatic Series	Gordon Rempel	Nominated	
Leo Awards	2011	Best Dramatic Series	Damian Kindler, Amanda Tapping, Martin Wood, Alan McCullough, S. Lily Hui, James Thorpe, Lee Wilson, George Horie, Gillian Horvath	Nominated	
Leo Awards	2011	Best Screenwriting in a Dramatic Series	Damian Kindler	Nominated	
Leo Awards	2011	Best Screenwriting in a Dramatic Series	James Thorpe	Nominated	
Leo Awards	2011	Best Direction in a Dramatic Series	Steven A. Adelson	Nominated	
Leo Awards	2011	Best Overall Sound in a Dramatic Series	Hugo De La Cerda, Kevin Belen, Kevin Sands, Jean Tejkel	Won	
Leo Awards	2011	Best Stunt Coordination in a Dramatic Series	Marshall Virtue, Rob Hayter	Nominated	
Leo Awards	2011	Best Picture Editing in a Dramatic Series	Eric Hill	Nominated	
Leo Awards	2012	Best Dramatic Series	Damian Kindler, Amanda Tapping, Martin Wood, Alan McCullough, S. Lily Hui, James Thorpe, Lee Wilson, George Horie, Gillian Horvath	Nominated	
Leo Awards	2012	Best Direction in a Dramatic Series	Damian Kindler	Nominated	
Leo Awards	2012	Best Direction in a Dramatic Series	Martin Wood	Nominated	
Leo Awards	2012	Best Direction in a Dramatic Series	Steven A. Adelson	Won	
Leo Awards	2012	Best Lead Performance by a Female in a Dramatic Series	Amanda Tapping	Nominated	
Leo Awards	2012	Best Lead Performance by a Male in a Dramatic Series	Robin Dunne	Nominated	
Leo Awards	2012	Best Guest Performance by a Female in a Dramatic Series	Pascale Hutton	Won	
Leo Awards	2012	Best Guest Performance by a Male in a Dramatic Series	Jonathan Young	Nominated	
Leo Awards	2012	Best Screenwriting in a Dramatic Series	James Thorpe	Nominated	
Leo Awards	2012	Best Screenwriting in a Dramatic Series	Damian Kindler	Nominated	
Leo Awards	2012	Best Visual Effects in a Dramatic Series	Lee Wilson, Caleb Ashmore, Matthew Belbin, Sebastien Bergeron, Ken Lee, Lionel Lim, Mladen Miholjcic, Les Quinn, Lisa Sepp-Wilson, Philippe Thibault	Won	
Leo Awards	2012	Best Picture Editing in a Dramatic Series	Gordon Rempel	Nominated	
Leo Awards	2012	Best Cinematography in a Dramatic Series	Gordon Verheul	Nominated	
Leo Awards	2012	Best Stunt Coordination in a Dramatic Series	Marshall Virtue	Nominated	
Leo Awards	2012	Best Costume Design in a Dramatic Series	Christina McQuarrie	Won	
Leo Awards	2012	Best Production Design in a Dramatic Series	Bridget McGuire	Won	
Director's Guild of Canada	2010	Outstanding Team Achievement in a Television Series - Drama	Damian Kindler, Martin Wood, Doug Brons, Gordon D. MacDonald, Eddy Hardy, Gisela Schulte, Chantelle Collett, Tanner Adams, Amanda Eglisson, Michael McAree, Bruce Brownstein, Heather Vedan, Scott Walden, Stephen Sangster, Terry Brooks, Doug John White	Nominated	
Writers Guild of Canada Screenwriting Awards	2012	Drama	Alan McCullough	Nominated	
Gemini Awards	2009	Best Visual Effects	Lee Wilson, Caleb Ashmore, Matthew Belbin, Sebastien Bergeron, Ken Lee, Lionel Lim, Mladen Miholjcic, Les Quinn, Lisa Sepp-Wilson, Philippe Thibault	Won	
Gemini Awards	2009	Best Direction in a Dramatic Series	Steven A. Adelson	Nominated	
Gemini Awards	2010	Best Sound in a Dramatic Series	Hugo De La Cerda, Kevin Belen, Kirby Jinnah, Ryan Nowak, Mike Paprocki, Kevin Sands, Jean Tejkel, Kevin Townshend	Nominated	
Gemini Awards	2011	Best Original Music Score for a Program or Series	Andrew Lockington	Nominated	
Gemini Awards	2011	Best Visual Effects	Les Quinn, Lionel Lim, Sébastien Bergeron, Stephen Kelloway, Lee Wilson, Matt Belbin, Brian Burritt, Lisa Sepp-Wilson, Andrew Bain, Mark A. Lasoff	Nominated	
