= Sanctuary for All =

- Sanctuary episodes
- Will Zimmerman and Helen Magnus in the "Sanctuary"
- Episode nos.: Season 1 Episodes 1 & 2
- Directed by: Martin Wood
- Story by: Damian Kindler
- Teleplay by: Sam Egan & Damian Kindler
- Original air date: October 3, 2008

Guest appearances
- Ryan Robbins as Henry Foss; Kavan Smith as Joe Kavanagh; Kandyse McClure as Meg; Cainan Wiebe as Alexi; Panou as Sylvio Rudd; Peter Shinkoda as Andy Fetz; Chuck Campbell as Two Faced Guy (front face); Brad Proctor as Two Faced Guy (back face); Darien Provost as Young Will; Nicholas Podbrey as Man; Michael Adamthwaite as Albert Russo; Malik McCall as Lawrence Birch; Diana Pavlovská as Jagna Mitrovna; Aidan Pringle as Vern Kovacs; Mihola Terzic as Waitress; Kirsten Robek as Mary Anne Zimmerman; Dana McLoughlin as Hooker/John's victim; David (Dan) Joffre as Transit Cop; Dan Shea as Transit Cop; Amanda May as Sally, the Mermaid; Ian Wallace as Fire Creature; Ivan de Leon as Med Tech; Ellie Harvey as Eleanor; Sheri Noel as Molly

Episode chronology
| ← Previous "Web series" | Next → "Fata Morgana" |

"Sanctuary for All" is the two-part series premiere of the science fiction television series Sanctuary, a television spinoff from the web series of the same name. Both parts originally aired on the Sci Fi Channel in the United States for October 3, 2008, and subsequently aired on ITV4 in the United Kingdom on October 6 and October 13, 2008. They were written by Damian Kindler, and directed by Martin Wood; both were known for their works on the Stargate franchise.

"Sanctuary for All" is set in the fictional city of Old City, where forensic psychiatrist Will Zimmerman (Robin Dunne) investigates the bizarre murder of two police officers, and eventually comes across Helen Magnus (Amanda Tapping) and her team, who are hunting the creature responsible, known as an "abnormal". The title refers to the motto on Magnus's business card. It also achieved high ratings for both the Sci Fi Channel and ITV4, and received generally positive reviews. For its visual effects, the series premiere won a Gemini Award, and a further Leo and Emmy nominations.

== Plot ==
=== Part 1 ===
As the episode opens, two police officers answer a call to a disturbance in the home of Eastern European immigrants. They discover the body of a man, apparently shot in the head, then they notice a young boy cowering under the bed in the same room. As he attempts to coax the boy out, the first officer is killed by a mysterious snake-like creature, which stabs him in the forehead, leaving a wound resembling a gunshot. When the boy emerges from behind the bed, the snake creature rears and (although not shown) it kills the second officer.

After the deaths, forensic expert Will Zimmerman (Robin Dunne) is called in to inspect the murder scene. The police assume the victims have been shot, and claim to have apprehended the shooter (played by David Hewlett in the first webisode, but was played by another actor in this episode), who was fleeing the scene. Will sees no evidence of a gun being used and quickly deduces that all is not as it seems at the apartment, but his theories are ridiculed by Detective Joe Kavanagh (Kavan Smith). As he leaves, Will spots the boy and chases him down a back alley, where he narrowly avoids being struck by a young woman on a motorcycle who is also evidently pursuing the boy. He begins to chase them both, but moments later he is struck from behind by a car. Before lapsing into unconsciousness, he catches a glimpse of the driver—Helen Magnus.

Will regains consciousness and finds himself at Magnus' home. She begins to explain the truth behind the murders, and reveals that she knows about Will's long-repressed and traumatic childhood memory of his mother being killed by some kind of monster. She offers Will a position with her organization - The Sanctuary, which is housed in a top secret base under a partially ruined cathedral in an unnamed city. It houses a variety of "abnormals," who are, she believes, some of nature's triumphs and mistakes. Magnus explains that these creatures would have been mistreated, exploited or killed in the outside world, and that she and her team have dedicated their lives to rescuing and caring for these abnormals. She shows Will the fantastic creatures who inhabit the Sanctuary, including a mermaid; he also meets a Bigfoot (played by Christopher Heyerdahl), who has become one of Magnus' staff after being rescued and healed by her.

She tells Will that she has been tracking the "snake-boy", cryptically hinting that he is, and yet is not, responsible for the murders. Though very reluctant and confused, Will agrees to give the new job a try. In the next sequence, we discover that the girl on the motorcycle is Magnus' daughter, Ashley (Emilie Ullerup); she locates and chases the "mutant" boy down into the subway tunnels and after she finally corners him, Helen arrives and assists with his capture. On their return to the Sanctuary, they discover that the boy, Alexi (Cainan Wiebe) has a symbiotic appendage growing from his abdomen, which seems to have a will of its own. This symbiote is evidently responsible for the murders, although the team are as yet unable to work out why, so Magnus assigns Will his first task - questioning the boy and finding out why his symbiote has killed.

=== Part 2 ===
Will questions Alexi, and realizes that the symbiote detects fear in its host and only kills if the boy feels frightened, remaining dormant if he feels safe. They also learn that his mutation has been caused by the Chernobyl disaster. Meanwhile, John Druitt (also played by Christopher Heyerdahl), who appears to have the power to teleport anywhere at will, arrives in search of the Sanctuary, although he is at first prevented from entering by some kind of force barrier. John then locates Ashley and confronts her; after a struggle, she and one of her colleagues are eventually able to subdue him using tranquillizers and a powerful Taser charge, although as he collapses he recites some kind of poem or incantation which mentions "The Five" (this is the first reference in the series to a key plot element which will have great significance in later episodes). Helen has meanwhile learned of a prostitute who has been murdered, and seems somewhat disturbed by this development.

Soon after Ashley has brought Druitt inside the Sanctuary, he immediately escapes and forces Magnus' technical expert Henry Foss (Ryan Robbins) to shut down the EM shield. It is because of Druitt's power that Magnus has placed an EM shield around the Sanctuary, to prevent him from being able to teleport into it and within it. Now free to teleport at will, he appears in Magnus' study, seizes Ashley, teleports away with her, and imprisons her in the enclosure of one of the deadliest abnormals, as a means of forcing Magnus to do his bidding. However, unknown to Druitt, Ashley is quickly rescued by Will and "Bigfoot". Druitt then returns to Helen, reveals that he is dying again, and forces her to give him some of her blood to save him. However Magnus has prepared for such an eventuality and gives him a poisoned blood vial instead, hoping to end his reign of terror. Although evidently affected, Druitt manages to teleport away.

Soon after, Will's repressed childhood memories are triggered by the sight of the abnormal from which Ashley has just been rescued. He finally realizes that it was Magnus who had saved him as a boy from the monster that killed his mother. Realizing that she looks exactly the same, he at first assumes that she can travel through time, however Magnus admits that she is in fact 157 years old.

Helen also reveals that Druitt had been her first patient in the 1880s. After suffering a life-threatening illness, she saved his life, but the procedure had an unintended side-effect. It caused a madness within him, and he went on a killing spree, murdering eight prostitutes in Victorian London - John Druitt is in fact the serial killer who has become known to history as Jack the Ripper. In a flashback, we see Helen confronting John in an attempt to stop him committing the last Ripper murder, but he kills the woman anyway and teleports away, although Magnus apparently wounds him as he vanishes. Will suspects that Druitt was more than just her patient, and Magnus' reaction confirms it. She then reveals that, after John's disappearance, she froze the embryo she had conceived with him, but when she could no longer bear the loneliness and believed John was gone for good, she brought it to term; giving birth to their daughter Ashley, who knows nothing of her father's true identity. Zimmerman decides to join the Sanctuary.

== Production ==
The producers wished to feature the series in a fictional city, Old City, located in the West Coast of North America. The working name for the city was "Odisburg". The idea behind Alexi's "creepy" expressions in the beginning of the episode were Wiebe's idea, and the producers granted his request.

Both parts of the episode were effectively reshoots of the first of the original webisodes. According to director Martin Wood, much of the footage of the webisodes were reshot in a very similar style. The producers decided not to include virtual sets for the first 20 minutes of the episode, in order to lull the audience to a false sense of security, so the production crew filmed on location. The apartment building from the beginning of the episode were shot at the partially decommissioned Riverview mental care facility. Because the producers found the location "creepy", they felt the location could be used to impart this creepiness to the audience. In the 18 months between the webisodes and the series, Wiebe grew taller. The corpses used in the beginning were mannequins the props department had in their possession and put holes in the forehead, and were easier to use than actors.

Like the web series, much of the episodes were filmed on green screen. The production team performed over 480 visual effects shots, compared to 12 visual effects shots from an average Stargate episode. Amanda Tapping (also executive producer of the series) described the process of using the green screen like doing theatre, and hadn't used green screen to such an extent during her tenure in Stargate. The opening shot for the premiere took three months for special effects supervisor Lee Wilson's Vancouver-based company to complete.

== Reception ==
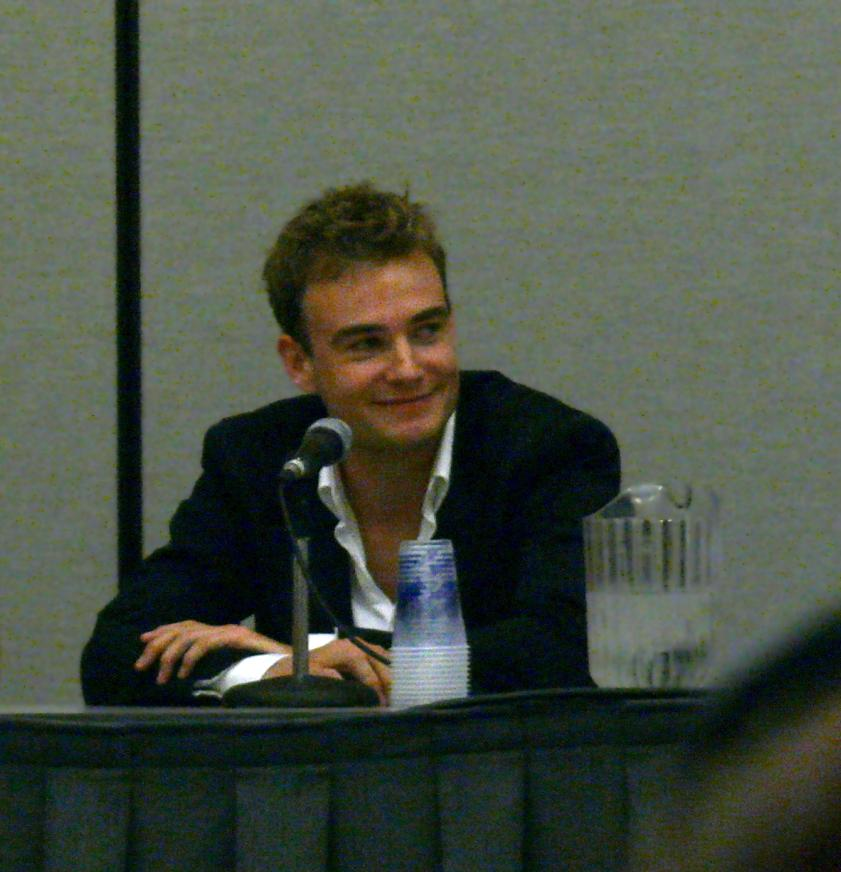
Some reviewers have said that Robin Dunne's character, Will Zimmerman is somewhat similar to Stargate SG-1's Daniel Jackson.

The series premiere received a household rating of 2.2, the highest rated original series premiere from the Sci Fi Channel since the series premiere of Eureka in July 2006. The 2.2 rating represented more than 2.7 million viewers; 1.08 million among the adult 18–49 demographic and 1.4 million among the adult 25–54 demographic. This placed Sanctuary the number one cable program among adults 25–54, and number four among adults 18–49. The ratings success also boosted the web series to 1.2 million views. In the United Kingdom, both parts placed the series first place on the top ten viewing programmes for ITV4 during the two weeks they aired. The first part was viewed by 565,000, while the second part received a higher viewing figure of 608,000.

Reviews of the pilot were generally positive, where reviewers marked comparisons between Sanctuary, and other science fiction series such as Primeval and Torchwood, as well as the comparisons between Zimmerman and Stargate SG-1's Daniel Jackson. Jason Hughes of TV Squad described the episode as "one of the more hyped premieres of recent years on Sci Fi," and thought it made a "nice job of creating a cohesive narrative from the elements of [the] webisodes," as well as praising Christopher Heyerdahl's acting for John Druitt's stereotype as the antagonist. Hughes also dubbed the green screen usage as a resounding success, though he felt that some of the scenes somewhat hindered the pace of the episode. Mark Wilson of About.com stated that the synergy between the writers and cast looked promising, and that Robin Dunne's performance is "one who really pulls the viewer into Sanctuary," as well as stating the cast served as eye candy for the viewers, since they consist of guest stars, who made other appearances throughout other series as Stargate (Tapping, Heyerdahl, Kavan Smith), Battlestar Galactica (Kandyse McClure), Flash Gordon (Panou) and The 4400 (Caiman Wiebe).

Tory Ireland Mell of IGN rated the episode a "great" 8.7 out of 10, describing the story as intriguing, and the concept as mind blowing, and though the concept of the series from a production standpoint was executed well, but criticised the seemingly slow pace. Paul Simpson of Total Sci-Fi rated the both parts 7/10, and made comparisons of this episode, and "Everything Changes", the pilot episode of Torchwood. He thought the first part, with such aspects as Heyerdahl's effective acting holds potential for the series, while the second part still reminisces Simpson of Primeval and Torchwood again, but still holds potential. However, Brian Lowry of Variety has said that the pilot episode was "Uninspiring" and further stated that it didn't "Rock anyone else's world."

The visual effects of the episodes were submitted for three award nominations, one of which was won. In 2009, the first part won a Gemini Award for "Best Visual Effects", beating fellow nominee "The Five". It received a Leo Award nomination for "Best Visual Effects in a Dramatic Series," but lost to Stargate Atlantis' "First Contact". It was nominated for a Primetime Emmy Award for Outstanding Special Visual Effects but lost to Heroes.
