= Sanctuary season 1 =

First season of the Canadian television series

Sanctuary
- Season 1
- DVD cover art
- Starring: Amanda Tapping; Robin Dunne; Emilie Ullerup; Christopher Heyerdahl
- No. of episodes: 13

Release
- Original network: Sci Fi Channel
- Original release: October 3, 2008 – January 5, 2009

Season chronology
- Next → Season 2

The first season of the Canadian science fiction–fantasy television series Sanctuary premiered on the Sci Fi Channel in the United States on October 3, 2008, and concluded on ITV4 in the United Kingdom on January 5, 2009, after 13 episodes. It follows the actions of a secret organization known as the Sanctuary, who track down a series of creatures known as abnormals, and then bring them to the Sanctuary for refuge. The main story arc of the season involves the Sanctuary working against the Cabal, an organization who seek to control all abnormals for their own gain.

Initially an eight-part web series, Sanctuary was successful enough for Sci Fi to commission a television series. Series creator and head writer Damian Kindler hired Sam Egan, and the two wrote all the episodes and composed the season-long storyline. Many episodes had been written throughout the 2007 Christmas season before the season was green-lit. Principal photography started in May 2008. It was the first instance in North American television where RED cameras were used. Most of the season was filmed using green screen in a warehouse in Burnaby, British Columbia, though there are instances throughout that were filmed on location, including the Riverview Hospital in Coquitlam and the North Shore Mountains outside Vancouver. Anthem Visual Effects produced the season's visual effects. The virtual sets meant that they produced around 400 visual effects per episode. Other forms of special effects, including prosthetics, were used to present the abnormals. The first season was budgeted at an estimated $21 million.

Sanctuary's first season aired in over 50 countries worldwide. The season premiere drew the largest audience with 2.7 million viewers, the highest rated Sci Fi premiere since Eureka in July 2006. Including time-shifted viewing, the season was seen by an average of 2.35 million viewers per episode; the ratings success allowed Sci Fi to renew Sanctuary for a second season. Critical reactions of the season were mixed. Some reviewers noted that, although the first six episodes were "hit and miss", they liked the later episodes. In total, it won five awards: one Gemini and four Leos. The first season was released on a four-disc set on DVD and Blu-ray Disc on September 9, 2009, in Region 4, September 15 in Region 1, and October 15 in Region 2.

== Episodes ==
No. overall	No. in season	Title	Directed by	Written by	Original release date	US viewers (millions)
1	1	"Sanctuary for All (Part 1)"	Martin Wood	Story by : Damian Kindler; Teleplay by : Sam Egan & Damian Kindler	October 3, 2008	2.70
An old man and two police officers are murdered by a strange appendage attached to an Eastern European boy named Alexei (Cainan Wiebe), who disappears before a police investigation. Forensic psychiatrist Will Zimmerman (Robin Dunne) is in the investigation, but in the process, he encounters Helen Magnus (Amanda Tapping), a 157 year-old scientist who believes Will can become her new protégé. Magnus operates a secret Sanctuary Network, designed to house creatures known as "Abnormals". She too has been tracking Alexei, but is also trying to understand and help him. After Alexei is captured by her daughter Ashley (Emilie Ullerup), Magnus decides to appoint a reluctant Will to question the boy.
2	2	"Sanctuary for All (Part 2)"	Martin Wood	Story by : Damian Kindler; Teleplay by : Sam Egan & Damian Kindler	October 3, 2008	2.70
Will learns that Alexi's appendage only kills if he feels scared. The boy is a victim of mutation caused by the Chernobyl disaster. While Alexi is accepted in his new home at the Sanctuary, Magnus learns that her former fiancé, John Druitt (Christopher Heyerdahl), is in the city looking for her. It is revealed that in Victorian era London, Druitt began teleporting at will, but doing so results in brain damage, causing him to lose his sanity. Murdering several prostitutes, Druitt is revealed to be Jack the Ripper. He comes to see Magnus because he is dying, and wants her blood to cure him. However, Magnus swaps the syringe with poison; Druitt teleports out, leaving his fate unknown. In the end, after rescuing Ashley from Druitt, Will decides to accept Magnus' offer.
3	3	"Fata Morgana"	Martin Wood	Story by : Damian Kindler & Martin Wood; Teleplay by : Damian Kindler	October 10, 2008	N/A (Note: Though there are no known viewer ratings thus far, "Fata Morgana" achieved a household rating of 1.6, according to ISN News.net)
The team uncover three women, Caird (Laura Mennell), Danu (Miranda Frigon), and Tatha (Leah Cairns), who had been buried in an ancient crypt in Scotland for 1,200 years. After they are collected, the women eventually recall causing a mass devastation in a village. Magnus believes they are the Morrígan, who were used to bring death on a battlefield. Will attempts to convince them they no longer have a master, and teaches them about freedom. Meanwhile, the team also become aware of the Cabal, and Ashley learns of their plot to control abnormals. They capture several crypt keepers to retrieve the Morrígan; they decide to turn themselves in, but due to Will's influence they break free from their captors.
4	4	"Folding Man"	James Head	Sam Egan	October 17, 2008	N/A (Note: Though there are no known viewer ratings thus far, "Folding Man" achieved a household rating of 1.6, according to ISN News.net)
While investigating a series of mysterious robberies where the suspects disappear, the Sanctuary team encounters a group of abnormals with the ability to "fold" their bodies, allowing them to squeeze through impossibly small spaces. It is determined that a gang of folding men are stealing gold to be used as a recreational drug to ease the pain from folding. They also discover a plot for the gang to take control of the crime world. A man they captured, Malcolm Dawkins (Peter Outerbridge), claims to want to help stop the others. However, it is later revealed he is their leader, and he lures Will into a trap. However, Will convinces the rest of the gang to turn against him, and they are freed.
5	5	"Kush"	Martin Wood	Damian Kindler	October 24, 2008	N/A (Note: Though there are no known viewer ratings thus far, "Kush" achieved a household rating of 1.4, according to ISN News.net)
Will and Magnus' plane crash lands on the Hindu Kush while returning with a captured abnormal. With a rescue team on the way, the escaped creature kills the other survivors one by one. The abnormal kills by manipulating its victim's dreams, and can also take any form it wishes. Eventually, only Will, Magnus, and Dr. Allison Grant (Sarah Strange) remain. It is later revealed that the creature killed Grant and took her form; it tricks Will into going outside so it can take his form and kill Magnus. However, she exposes the imposter (the creature does not know Magnus hates coffee, a fact of which Will would be aware) and kills it.
6	6	"Nubbins"	Peter DeLuise	Sam Egan	November 7, 2008	N/A (Note: Though there are no known viewer ratings thus far, "Nubbins" achieved a household rating of 1.5, according to ISN News.net)
Ashley brings home two adorable and seemingly harmless abnormals, which she calls "Nubbins", following an expedition. However they reproduce quickly and overrun the Sanctuary. One of the Nubbins' defensive mechanisms is to release a substance like a pheromone that makes the "enemy" giddy and amorous, which further hinders the capture efforts. In an attempt to control the Nubbin population, the team unleashes the Nubbins' natural predator, one of which was also captured during Ashley's expedition, but the Nubbins turn the tables and eat the creature alive. Eventually, the Sanctuary team are able to lure the Nubbins to one location with a certain sound frequency, and manage to place them into captivity again. The team lowers the temperature of the Nubbin enclosure, which is another method of population control.
7	7	"The Five"	Martin Wood	Damian Kindler	November 14, 2008	N/A (Note: Though there are no known viewer ratings thus far, "The Five" achieved a household rating of 1.5, according to ISN News.net)
While teaching a lecture in Rome, Magnus meets an old acquaintance, Nikola Tesla (Jonathon Young), to warn her the Cabal are after her, seeking revenge for the events of "Fata Morgana". Druitt returns to capture Ashley, claiming that his murderous anger was suppressed when Tesla revived him. He tells her Tesla is dangerous and they must stop him. Druitt also reveals that he, Magnus, and Tesla were part of "the Five", a secret group during the Victorian era; each member injected themselves with pure vampire blood, giving them special abilities (Druitt's teleportation, Magnus' longevity, and Tesla being half-vampire). Tesla kills the Cabal mercenaries but regenerates them as his minions with his own blood. Druitt intervenes, kills Tesla before he can kill her, and teleports Magnus away from the mercenaries. Meanwhile, Will and Bigfoot (Heyerdahl) investigate mysterious attacks in the Sanctuary. The culprit is revealed to be a snake-like creature, and is stopped by Henry Foss (Ryan Robbins), who is revealed to be a werewolf.
8	8	"Edward"	Brenton Spencer	Sam Egan	November 21, 2008	1.75
Detective Joe Kavanaugh (Kavan Smith) asks Will to investigate an apparent suicide. The victim's son Edward (Michael Eisner) can draw pictures very quickly and accurately. Through his drawings, the team learn that the father was fighting with his brother, Robbie; the two struggled over a shotgun until it overheated with their abnormal powers, causing the shells to go off. Against Helen's wishes, Will takes the evidence to the police, only to find it taken by certain men who find Edward's family very important. Meanwhile, Ashley contends with the fact that Druitt is her father. Henry considers surgery to rid himself of his werewolf side, but eventually chooses not to after using his newfound tracking ability to find Robbie. He realizes the uses his powers could have and learns to control them.
9	9	"Requiem"	Martin Wood	Damian Kindler	December 5, 2008	1.54
Magnus and Will journey to the Bermuda Triangle to answer a distress call they learn about from Sally, a mermaid living in the Sanctuary. Sally has received images from her kin of their plight; however, Magnus and Will are too late to save them, as they find the entire race has been wiped out by an aggressive parasite. When Magnus examines a corpse, she too gets infected, and the parasite threatens to take over her thought processes. To prevent this, she dives the submarine deeper and deeper in the hopes that the parasite will not withstand the pressure. When this does not work, the parasite overwhelms her, and tries to push her into killing Will and presumably herself. Will is able to trap Magnus in a room, which he seals so that he can drain all the oxygen from it. After Magnus dies, Will captures the escaping parasite and revives her.
10	10	"Warriors"	Brenton Spencer	Story by : Peter Mohan; Teleplay by : Sam Egan	December 12, 2008	1.70
Magnus and Ashley assist Will in investigating the disappearance of his old friend Danny (Byron Lawson). In the process, they find a man who appears to be Magnus' long-lost father Gregory Magnus (Jim Byrnes). At first having no recollection of her, he eventually regains his memories after Magnus removes a parasite from him. He informs her that the Cabal are behind Danny's disappearance among others; they have used the parasites to transform humans into aggressive abnormals, which the Cabal intend to use as an army. Will is captured by Cabal agents and finds that Danny has turned into one. After he too undergoes a transformation, the two are sent to a warehouse, where they are pitched in Fight Club-style combat. Magnus, Ashley, and Henry find the warehouse and stop the operation, and by the end of the episode Will and Danny have reverted to their normal human selves.
11	11	"Instinct"	Steven A. Adelson	Damian Kindler	December 19, 2008	1.52
From the point-of-view of a camera, weathergirl Amy Saunders (Rekha Sharma) and cameraman Zach Pencer (Matty Finochio) try to get their first exclusive news story in a restricted warehouse, where three people were brutally killed by a strange creature brought back from an island between Japan and Korea. They encounter the Sanctuary team, who are tracking down the creature. During the documentation, they uncover a nest in a crate, and decide to lure the creature there and capture it. However, after they succeed, they discover a second creature. They kill it, but Zach dies in the process. Saunders makes a promise not to release the video, but ends up breaking it, threatening Magnus' anonymity and the security of the Sanctuary operation. When she plays the video however, Saunders finds that Magnus swapped it for a personal message, telling Saunders she will not make a breaking story from those events.
12	12	"Revelations (Part 1)"	Martin Wood	Story by : Sam Egan & Damian Kindler; Teleplay by : Sam Egan	December 29, 2008 (Note: The episode originally aired on ITV4 on December 29, 2008; The Sci Fi Channel aired the episode later, on January 2, 2009)	1.85
The Cabal launch Lazarus, a biological weapon designed to make Abnormals attack humans, at the Yukon/Alaska border. Druitt makes an unwelcome return to the Sanctuary as he, too, sees the significance of the situation. Sir James Watson (Peter Wingfield), another member of the Five and the leader of the UK Sanctuary, arrives to confirm Druitt's story. Watson's gift is great intelligence and reasoning ability; he does not have the longevity of the others, but has created an exoskeleton to keep him young. Later, Bigfoot gets infected and has to be kept in confinement. The only way to create a vaccine to stop the Cabal is to retrieve the source blood (a vial of pure Vampire blood) stored against dire emergencies in the lost city of Bhalasaam in the Indian Himalayas. In order to regroup the Five to get the vial, they contact Clara Griffin (Christine Chatelain), granddaughter of the late Nigel Griffin; she has inherited his invisibility skills. However, when they arrive in Bhalasaam, they find the city in ruins. Meanwhile, Ashley and Henry are captured by Cabal agents after breaking into their weapons facility to stop the development of the bioweapon.
13	13	"Revelations (Part 2)"	Martin Wood	Story by : Sam Egan & Damian Kindler; Teleplay by : Damian Kindler	January 5, 2009 (Note: The episode originally aired on ITV4 on January 5, 2009; The Sci Fi Channel aired the episode later, on January 9, 2009)	2.00
Using Watson's intellect, the four members of the Five find an entrance to an underground complex. There they find Tesla, who survived their last encounter because his vampiric powers have made him immortal. They must all work together to retrieve the vial, as the complex houses a number of challenges designed to test the powers of each member of the Five. They succeed in retrieving the keys and recover the blood sample. Watson's exoskeleton fails and he dies, but not before telling Will that there is a missing piece that he must find. Meanwhile, Ashley learns from Cabal leader Dana Witcomb (Lynda Boyd) that they intend to release the virus worldwide; they also intend to turn Henry into a werewolf permanently. However, he and Ashley escape and retrieve the files describing Lazarus. Once the team is regrouped at the Sanctuary, Will realizes too late that Ashley is the missing piece; she has turned against the team and steals the vial using her new teleportation ability. The betrayed team finds that the retrieved files are also fake. In the end, Ashley arrives on Easter Island to deliver the blood to Whitcomb, who welcomes her into the Cabal.

== Cast ==
=== Regular cast ===
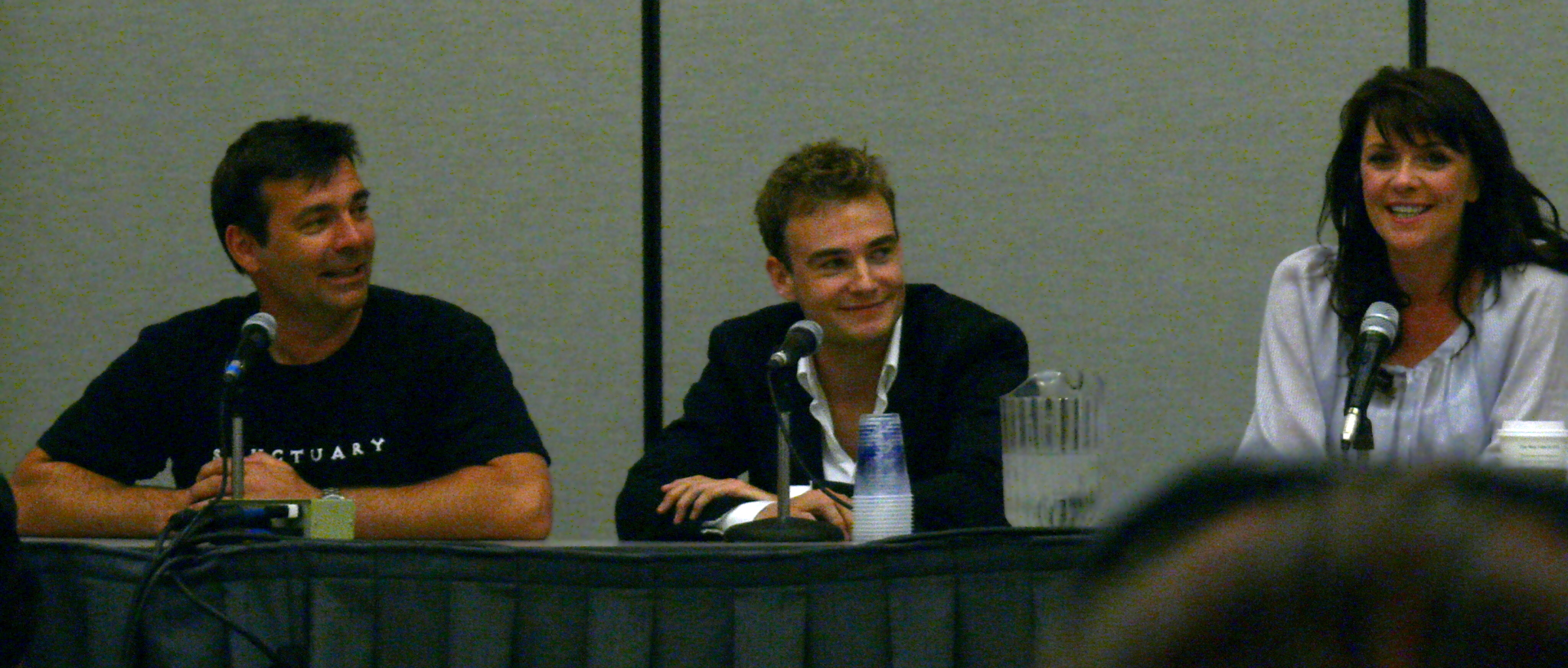
Series stars Robin Dunne (center) and Amanda Tapping (right) sitting with director Martin Wood (left) during the 2008 San Diego Comic-Con.

The first season consists of four principal cast members. Amanda Tapping plays series protagonist Helen Magnus, a 157-year-old English scientist who runs the Sanctuary network. Tapping darkened her hair color for the role. Robin Dunne plays Will Zimmerman, a former forensic psychiatrist and then Magnus' protégé since the pilot. Damian Kindler noted that Dunne's portrayal as Zimmerman differed vastly between the webisodes and the first season, often joking that Zimmerman was played by two different Dunnes. Emilie Ullerup plays Ashley, Magnus' daughter. Ullerup enjoyed working with the cast during the first season. She felt that Tapping was "such a teacher" to her, and that it had been "such a treat" working with Tapping as a young and new actress.

Christopher Heyerdahl plays two characters: Bigfoot, an abnormal who works in the Sanctuary, and John Druitt, Magnus' former fiancé and father to Ashley. As Bigfoot, Heyerdahl had to wear prosthetics. Tapping believed that Heyerdahl "has this incredible gift wearing prosthetics and acting through them and creating real humanity, and he does it with Bigfoot." Ullerup also felt nervous, yet excited playing every scene with Heyerdahl when he plays Druitt.

=== Recurring cast and guest appearances ===
Ryan Robbins plays Henry Foss, who runs the Sanctuary's computer and security systems. The producers wanted Henry to set a lighter tone to the series and add "goofy and fun" humor, including in somewhat dire situations. The producers cast Robbins, and were pleased with his performance. Chuck Campbell plays "two-faced guy", a character with another face at the back of his head. The back face was accomplished using visual effects. Panou plays Sylvio, an associate of Ashley's. The character was originally named Ernie and was played by director Peter DeLuise in the webisodes, but he was unavailable to reshoot his scenes for the season premiere. Jonathon Young stars as Nikola Tesla. Heyerdahl suggested Young to the producers, who ended up being highly impressed by his performance. Young also played Tesla in a one-man show before appearing in the series. Whilst filming the second part of "Revelations", Young's scenes in the underground city were filmed first, as he was scheduled for another play while the episode was shot.

At the time of filming "The Five", the actors who played Watson and Griffin had not been cast yet. The producers would later cast Peter Wingfield as Watson. According to Amanda Tapping, casting Wingfield was "so easy" as "he has this sensibility about him, much like [Christopher Heyerdahl] does." While filming his scenes, Wingfield did not want his exoskeleton prop to be removed between takes, as he wanted to stay in character. When the producers conceived Clara Griffin, the granddaughter of Nigel Griffin, they were looking for a young local actress to play the part who would look like a potential love interest to Will Zimmerman. Christine Chatelain would later play the part after she was recommended by Dunne, as they had worked together before.

When Adrien Dorval auditioned for his part on "Kush", Kindler did not like his performance, but Wood did, as he believed the actor's performance was perfect for a character who was stranded on a plane. For the same episode, Sarah Strange and Thai-Hoa Lee had to learn how to speak Standard Tibetan phonetically a week in advance of filming. Katharine Isabelle guest starred in "Nubbins" as Sophie. While filming her scenes, Isabelle complained of a dry eye problem, which kept making her almost tear up. However, it ended up being beneficial for her portrayal of her character. Canadian actor Daryl Shuttleworth guest stars as a fight promoter in "Warriors". During a readthrough of the script, Shuttleworth decided his character should speak with a British accent like in the film Lock, Stock and Two Smoking Barrels. The producers wanted to cast Rekha Sharma in "Instinct" as she appeared in several other Vancouver-based productions, including Battlestar Galactica. The producers felt she "rocked" her audition, as she brought a lot of energy to her character.

== Production ==
=== Development ===
Series creator Damian Kindler conceived the pilot in 2001. When he became a Stargate SG-1 writer, he later asked Martin Wood, a director from the same show, if there was potential for a series, which Wood believed there was. A few years later, Kindler asked Amanda Tapping to take part in the project, and she accepted. Sanctuary originally started as an eight-part bi-weekly web series in 2007, produced by Vancouver-based Stage 3 Media. The producers of the series were looking to expand the series on other mediums, including television. Due to the success of the web series, in January 2008, the Sci Fi Channel announced the commissioning of a first season of 13 episodes. The move to television has allowed the producers to widen the scope for the season. According to actress and executive producer Amanda Tapping, the season "is very different from what you've seen on the Web". However, her character, Helen Magnus, would still be a "crazy character; [...] very eccentric and very sexy and very unapologetic". The season was given an estimated budget of $21 million.

=== Writing ===
All episodes of the first season were written by Sam Egan and Kindler; Kindler hired Egan to assist in writing the first season, as he believed Egan to be creative, passionate, and talented. Several episodes of the first season were written throughout the Christmas season in 2007. After the series was given the green-light, they were rewritten to establish a season-long storyline. Some of the episodes finished their writing stage as little as two and a half weeks before filming commenced. At times after the scripts were written, Sci Fi executive Mark Stern fed back to the writers, asking for certain elements to be explained so the audience could understand.

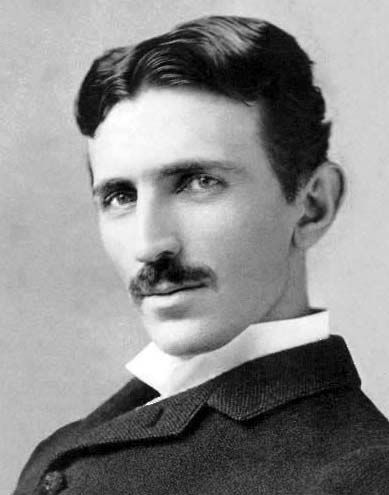
The season includes historical figures as characters, including Nikola Tesla (pictured). Kindler felt that adding Tesla was a "very ballsy thing."

Kindler wrote both parts of "Sanctuary for All", as well "Fata Morgana", "Kush", "The Five", "Requiem", "Instinct", and the second part of "Revelations". He penned his scripts quickly, with "Kush" being written in three and a half days. Wood contributed to the story of "Fata Morgana" by bringing up the idea of incorporating the Morrígan from Irish mythology, which would start giving the season an ancient and mythological feel. "Kush" introduces a series of episodes involving the working relationship between Will and Magnus. "The Five" became a significant part of the series mythology, revealing the Five, which Magnus is a part of, how Magnus got her longevity, and that Henry Foss is actually part werewolf. Tapping believed that introducing the Five was a "cool concept". Kindler introduced vampires in the episode, and felt it would be best to introduce them as a dead species. He also felt that including real-life historic figures such as Tesla was a "very ballsy thing". In "Requiem", Kindler wanted a scenario in which Will has to make a difficult decision to deal with Magnus when she becomes the threat of the episode. Though Kindler at first believed it was not a good episode, it ended up as a highlight of the season according to the producers. In writing "Instinct", Kindler, inspired by Cloverfield, wanted to show the audience the protagonists hunting an abnormal in real-time, where it does not always go according to plan.

Egan meanwhile, wrote "Folding Man", "Nubbins", "Edward", "Warriors", and the first part of "Revelations". He also co-wrote "Sanctuary for All" with Kindler. Egan liked to include the Rashomon effect in some of his scripts, a plot device which interprets scenes from different points of view. After writing "Folding Man", Egan realized that he inadvertently based it on an episode of The X-Files. "Nubbins" was inspired by the Star Trek original series episode "The Trouble with Tribbles". "Edward" was inspired by Egan hearing of a young English man with savant syndrome, who flew over a city he had not visited before, and was able to accurately draw the city on a mural some 20 feet wide. Because the episode involved an abnormal, Egan wanted the boy to draw much faster. In writing "Warriors", Egan wanted to reintroduce Magnus' father Gregory Magnus from the webisodes; there were plans to introduce him in "Fata Morgana", but the idea did not make it to the final episode. Gregory was written not to have the longevity of his daughter. Egan decided not to include a full explanation of how he survived a hundred years without aging, but wanted to hint to the audience that he was in fact cryogenically frozen by the Cabal. The intention behind "Revelations" was to tie some of the previous episodes together, particularly involving the Cabal, and then set them up for the second season. The main issue with writing the finale was showing Ashley being interrogated, where in fact she was experimented on to turn her to the Cabal. Because Kindler wrote his script quickly, he believed that the misdirect did not turn out the way he hoped.

=== Differences from the webisodes ===
Differences were made between the original webisodes and the first episodes of the season. One example is the introduction of Druitt. In the webisodes, Druitt murders a prostitute after arriving in Old City, but in the pilot, writer Damian Kindler included dialogue between the two characters before Druitt murders her, as a way of proving to the audience how evil he is. Another is the ending of "Fata Morgana", where the Morrígan leave the Sanctuary with the Cabal mercenaries; in the webisodes, the sisters escape. Druitt directly tells Ashley in one of the first webisodes that he is her father. In the first season, the producers decided that she would not be aware of this until midway through, and even then, they did not want Druitt to tell her directly, but rather hint it to her, so that Ashley can pick up the pieces herself.

=== Filming ===
Initial photography started in May 2008, and took place mostly in a warehouse in Burnaby, British Columbia. Each episode took around seven days to film, though some were completed in as little as five and a half. The first three episodes of the season were reshot from the original eight webisodes; the two-part premiere "Sanctuary for All" was reshot from the first four webisodes, while the third episode, "Fata Morgana", was reshot from the final four. Eighteen months passed between shooting the web series and the first three episodes. Difficulties with this included the fact that Cainan Wiebe, who portrays Alexi, grew taller, and the actors consciously played the characters to be more open to each other. It was filmed using Red One cameras, the first series in North America to use them. The Red camera system does away with tape and film and records straight to a hard drive, allowing Anthem Visual Effects and the series' post production team immediate access to the day's footage, and is capable of recording at 4K resolution—four times the resolution of current high-definition.

The season was filmed using five directors. Wood directed eight of the thirteen episodes; he spent 17 days preparing to film the premiere. He found that "Requiem" was his favorite episode to direct, while "The Five" was his least favorite, as he had to keep reorganizing six styrofoam sets. Among the remaining five episodes, James Head directed "Folding Man", Peter DeLuise directed "Nubbins", Brenton Spencer directed "Edward" and "Warriors", and Steven A. Adelson directed "Instinct"; Adelson filmed the episode with 40 long takes to accomplish a real-time perspective. DeLuise was approached by Wood to direct "Nubbins" as it was considered a lighter episode, which DeLuise preferred over a dramatic episode. In the past DeLuise would make cameo appearances in his works, but broke tradition in directing this episode.

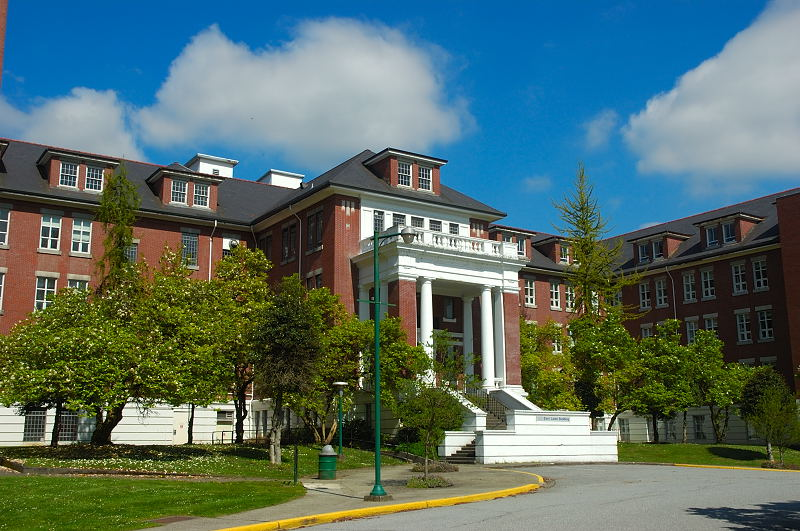
Some of the non-virtual sets used in the season were filmed at the partially decommissioned Riverview mental health facility, dubbed a "Swiss Army knife of locations" by Damian Kindler.

According to Head, about 70% of the season was filmed using green screen in the Burnaby warehouse. Unlike many other shows, elaborate sets were not built for the scenes to be filmed; instead, they are created using CGI technology. Because of the virtual sets, the actors had to visualise what the rooms they were in looked like. To aid them, practical props were placed. The production crew also used rain and wind machines to film scenes set outdoors. However, practical sets were also used throughout the season. The first 20 minutes of "Sanctuary for All" was filmed at the partially decommissioned Riverview Hospital, described by Kindler as a "Swiss Army knife of locations". Elsewhere, the studio parking lot and alleyways of The Bridge Studios provided a surrogate for several different types of locations, like city streets. A Volvo warehouse provided the filming location for "Instinct". The final filming days were spent on the North Shore Mountains outside Vancouver.

The fifth episode, "Kush", was filmed on a damaged fuselage set, which was built by production designer Bridget McGuire. The episode's cast disliked the episode the most because they had to act as if they were in freezing temperatures, where in fact it was around 40 degrees Celsius. Because it was an expensive set, the producers wanted to reuse it. It was later redesigned to look like the inside of a submarine for "Requiem". It was redressed again for "Revelations". Although released third, "Fata Morgana" was filmed as the fourth episode, and was considered to be aired after "Folding Man". However, Tapping felt strongly that it would make a great stand alone episode after "Sanctuary for All", and the characters appeared more comfortable with each other in "Folding Man". Swapping the episodes caused a major continuity issue, in which Ashley appears to show scratches on her neck from "Sanctuary for All" in "Folding Man", but not in between.

=== Effects ===
The season's visual effects were produced by Anthem Visual Effects, with the company's Lee Wilson serving as co-producer and visual effects supervisor. Because it was filmed in green screen, each episode contains an estimated 400 visual effect shots. In contrast, an average episode of Stargate SG-1, which Tapping starred in, contained only 12. One of the larger visual effects sequences was the opening sequence of the premiere, which took three months to produce. Each visual effect produced in the original webisodes was remastered. Among the characters, the movement of two-faced guy's rear face were made with Computer-generated imagery (CGI), though it was a difficult effect to produce. A prosthetic application was added to the back of Campbell's head when the second face is not talking. The mermaid character, Sally, was entirely a visual effect, with the face of Mandy May, wife of director Steven A. Adelson, rendered onto it. Creating the eponymous abnormals in "Nubbins" and their predator was what Sam Egan described as "a proper budget-driven issue" because rendering several CGI creatures at once and having them move would be difficult. It was decided to have them camouflaged in an attempt to make work easier for the visual effects team, but it did not work out as well as the producers hoped. To achieve Nubbin interaction with the cast, guide versions, nicknamed Oompa-Loompas, were made for them to carry. In designing Tesla's transition to a vampire, the producers, realizing vampires were included in several other works in the past, wanted to make them look unique. Wilson based the vampire look to the 2007 film 30 Days of Night.

Because of the hard work by Anthem, the producers made "Kush" and "Requiem" into bottle episodes, to give the visual effects team a break. Instead, other forms of special effects were used. To create the Himalayan feel of "Kush", the production crew used wind machines and paper snow. However, the fake snow became a problem for the cast, as they suffered from bloodshot eyes and scratchy throats when exposed to it. Aquariums were placed outside each port hole of the set in "Requiem". To complete the effects where Druitt teleports, Heyerdahl would walk out of the shot while every other cast member has to stay still, until the directors signal them to react; the shot of Heyerdahl walking out of frame would later be cut. Another effect involving Heyerdahl is a scene between both his characters, Bigfoot and Druitt, in "Revelations". To complete the shot, Heyerdahl had to film two different shots: one with him as Druitt talking to nothing, and another with him as Bigfoot talking to nothing. When both characters can be seen walking together, a stand-in would replace Heyerdahl as Bigfoot.

Another form of special effects are prosthetics used to create abnormals. They were composed by a team of make-up artists. Todd Masters stated that his team tried to make them interesting and unique every week. The abnormal shown at the end of "Kush" was a stand-in who wore a full prosthetic suit; the costume took a long time to apply. Among the prosthetics used in "Warriors", Dunne wore a muscle suit that was previously worn by Vinnie Jones during the 2006 film X-Men: The Last Stand.

The corpses used in the beginning of "Sanctuary for All" were mannequins the props department had in their possession, with holes added in the foreheads. Using mannequins was easier than using actors. The drawings in "Edward" were produced by Sanctuary's art department. The season's stunts were coordinated by Marshall Virtue. To develop the Fight Club scenes in "Warriors", fight coordinator Rob Hader helped with choreographing the stunts. While filming the scenes, Hader played one of the fighters. He replaced an actor who broke a knee after filming for six seconds.

== Broadcast and reception ==
=== Broadcast ===
Originally airing on the Sci Fi Channel in the United States, the first season was broadcast in over 50 countries worldwide. Tapping believed the channel was a "good home base", because she had worked with the network for several years before, adding "they understand the genre. They understand the fans." The season commenced with both parts of "Sanctuary for All" on October 3, 2008. The following episodes aired almost every Friday during the 10 to 11 pm time slot from October 10, 2008, until January 9, 2009. In Canada, it aired on Movie Channel One of The Movie Network. In the United Kingdom, the season was picked up for broadcast by ITV4. The first episode was broadcast on October 6, 2008, only three days after the release on the Sci Fi Channel. In Australia, the season debuted on ABC2 on March 1, 2010.

=== Ratings ===
"Sanctuary for All" started off the season with over 2.7 million viewers and a household rating of 2.2 after its original broadcast. It became Sci Fi Channel's highest rated series premiere since the pilot episode of Eureka in July 2006. It was the number one prime time cable entertainment program among adults aged 25 through 54 years, and fourth among adults aged 18 through 49 years. Because of the high ratings, views of Sci Fi's Sanctuary page rose to 1.2 million, as well as 287,000 video streams the day it was broadcast. Viewing figures for the following episodes were somewhat under 2 million, but the finale drew its biggest audience since the premiere; "Revelations (Part 2)" was seen by 2 million viewers and received a 1.6 household rating. Including timeshifted viewings, the first season averaged 2.35 million viewers, and a 1.8 rating. The first season of Sanctuary beat the fifth season of its lead in Stargate Atlantis by two tenths of a point. Because of the success, Sci Fi ordered a second season in November 2008. In the United Kingdom, the first part of "Sanctuary for All" was seen by 565,000 viewers. The second part received 608,000 viewers the following week. Since then, ratings have steadily declined to 398,000 by the season finale. The penultimate episode received the lowest ratings of the season, with only 279,000 viewers.

=== Critical reception ===
If yet another "Men in Black"-style, "Things that go bump in the night are real" drama sounds right up your dark alley, then "Sanctuary" is perhaps for you. Otherwise, there's little to recommend this dense drama, which recycles a number of familiar sci-fi tropes, as a mysterious woman leads a shadowy group in policing the wilds of the paranormal.

— Brian Lowry of Variety

The season received generally mixed reviews from critics. Metacritic gave the season a normalized rating of 56 out of 100 based on seven reviews, indicating "mixed or average reviews". Linda Stasi of the New York Post stated "the monsters are first rate, the virtual sets are very cool, the acting is excellent. Why I was fighting fatigue while watching, I can't say. It was either the martinis from Steve Dunleavy's farewell party – or the plot." Maureen Ryan of the Chicago Tribune felt the pace was "a little on the stately side", and was unclear why Tapping "speaks with an iffy English accent", but believed the "low-key, low-budget but well-intentioned sci-fi/action hybrid might be of interest to fans of Tapping's earlier work as Samantha Carter on Stargate SG-1". Robert Lloyd of the Los Angeles Times felt that "much of it feels dreadfully slow, not so much moody as stretched for time. Hard-to-sell dialogue such as 'Such imperfect children are often adopted by well-meaning immigrant families' doesn't make it flow any faster", but still stated "it looks great".

Brian Lowry of Variety called the first two episodes "competent but uninspiring", and said it "suffers by comparison with any number of similarly themed dramas, most recently BBC America's fun-loving Torchwood". Lowry also believes that "it's hard to imagine this series doing much more than satisfying some of the odd humanoids still pining for (and emailing on behalf of) Stargate". Mike Hale of The New York Times felt that Sanctuary "sits at about the same level of writing and performance as the Stargate shows, which means it doesn't have the narrative force of Battlestar Galactica or the wit and creativity of Sci Fi's best original series, Eureka", adding that "it's not an embarrassment for the channel, but it doesn't raise the stakes either". Hale also noted that there is a connection with Stargate, which is "in its 12th year and still going strong".

David Blackwell of Enterline Media thought that Sanctuary was an "interesting concept", but felt the first six episodes were "hit-or-miss". Of the series' use of green screen for sets, Blackwell stated "sometimes it really works and sometimes the CGI sets could use improvement". He also felt that Amanda Tapping was convincing as a British scientist. In conclusion, Blackwell stated "Sanctuary does take a while to kick in, but it is a very good series once the writers actually write something with depth." Alex Walker of Den of Geek rated the first season three stars out of five, stating "the acting and scripting is good, but Sanctuary lacks the wit and charm of the genre's top shows like Doctor Who and Battlestar Galactica. Also, the way some episodes alternate between fighting and exposition gives the impression of watching someone else play a videogame." Walker also dubbed it a "poor man's Buffy the Vampire Slayer, but said that it "makes for "agreeable early-evening viewing". Walker also believed that the DVD of the first season should really be for "die-hard fans only".

Paul Simpson of Total Sci-Fi rated the season 7 out of 10, and summed it up as "although frequently predictable, Sanctuary usually provides an entertaining hour." John Sinnott of DVD Talk, being a fan of Tapping's earlier work of Stargate SG-1, believes the first season is "highly recommended". Sinnott also noticed that while "the first six shows are so-so [...] the last seven are great".

=== Awards and nominations ===
The season won a total of five awards. The pilot episode "Sanctuary for All" won a 2009 Gemini Award for Best Visual Effects. The other four were Leo Awards. "Warriors" won "Best Make-Up in a Dramatic Series". Actor Ryan Robbins won "Best Guest Performance by a Male in a Dramatic Series" for his role as Henry Foss in "Edward", beating co-star Jonathan Young. Gabrielle Rose won "Best Guest Performance by a Female in a Dramatic Series" for the same episode. Amanda Tapping won "Best Lead Performance by a Female in a Dramatic Series" for her role as Helen Magnus in "Requiem". The most prestigious nomination for the season was for a Primetime Emmy Award for Outstanding Special Visual Effects for "Sanctuary for All", but it lost the award to Heroes.

== Home video releases ==
A DVD box set of the first season, published by E1 Entertainment, was first released in Region 1 on September 15, 2009, in Region 2 on October 12, 2009, and in Region 4 on September 9, 2009. The season was later released on Blu-ray Disc in the United States on June 15, 2010, and in Australia on June 9, 2010. The four-disc set consists of all 13 episodes, each with audio commentaries from cast and crew, as well as the original webisodes in two installments. The set also includes three behind the scenes featurettes: Welcome to the Sanctuary, The Sanctuary Residents, and Sanctuary Visual Effects, as well as a blooper reel, photo gallery, and sneak preview of season two. John Sinnott of DVD Talk reacted positively to the number of extras, rating it four and a half stars out of five; Sinnott was also "very pleased" to see the original webisodes included in the set.
