= Fata Morgana (Sanctuary) =

- Sanctuary episode
- Episode no.: Season 1 Episode 3
- Directed by: Martin Wood
- Story by: Damian Kindler & Martin Wood
- Teleplay by: Damian Kindler
- Original air date: October 10, 2008

Guest appearances
- Ryan Robbins as Henry Foss; Kandyse McClure as Meg; Chuck Campbell as Two-faced Guy; Miranda Frigon as Danu; Leah Cairns as Tatha; Laura Mennell as Caird

Episode chronology
← Previous "Sanctuary for All"	Next → "Folding Man"

"Fata Morgana" is the third episode of the science fiction television series Sanctuary. The episode first aired on the Sci Fi Channel in the United States on October 10, 2008. It subsequently aired on ITV4 in the United Kingdom on October 20, 2008. The episode, which is named after a mirage of the same name, was written by Damian Kindler. Martin Wood served as director.

"Fata Morgana" was originally released as the back half of the eight original Sanctuary webisodes in 2007. In the episode, the Sanctuary team investigate an ancient crypt in an island off the Scottish coast and encounter three sisters with abnormal powers. "Fata Morgana" was met with a 1.6 household rating and was generally well received by critics.

== Plot ==
The team travels to a crypt in an island off the coast of Scotland that Helen Magnus (Amanda Tapping) believes to contain an elixir of life. However, the team is spotted and ambushed. After defeating the abnormal crypt Keepers, the team finds three women in comatose state. They are brought to the Sanctuary for study, where it is later determined that the sisters, Danu (Miranda Frigon), Tatha (Leah Cairns) and Caird (Laura Mennell), have been held in suspended animation for 1,200 years. After the sisters awaken, Will Zimmerman (Robin Dunne) learns that they were taken to the crypt because of an incurable disease. However, Will believes they are delusional, partly due to their ability to speak perfect English for people from the Middle Ages (according to director Martin Wood, they were able to speak English after some sort of "mind meld" between Will and Danu). The sisters also experience nightmares in which they destroy an entire village. The sisters eventually determine that these nightmares are in fact memories, and it was they who caused the destruction 1,200 years ago.

After some research, Magnus determines that the sisters are the Morrígan, who were created with the intention of destroying man. Magnus also discovers ties to a powerful secret organization, the Cabal, who had put the sisters into the crypt to be used again in the future. Ashley Magnus (Emilie Ullerup) learns that the Cabal was formed in the seventh century with the intention of controlling every abnormal on Earth for their own benefit; since going underground in the nineteenth century, its members have infiltrated several major organizations worldwide to continue their operation.

In the meantime, a group of Cabal mercenaries have captured several Keepers in Scotland and they release them to the Sanctuary in order to regain what they see as their "property". Before and during the battle between Magnus and the Keepers, Will teaches the sisters about freedom, and sends them to a safe-house. After killing the Keepers, the team are surrounded by the mercenaries. In the end, Danu, Caird and Tatha surrender to the mercenaries who in exchange spare the team's lives. Will believes his teachings of freedom got to them, as they plan to escape from the mercenaries.

== Production ==
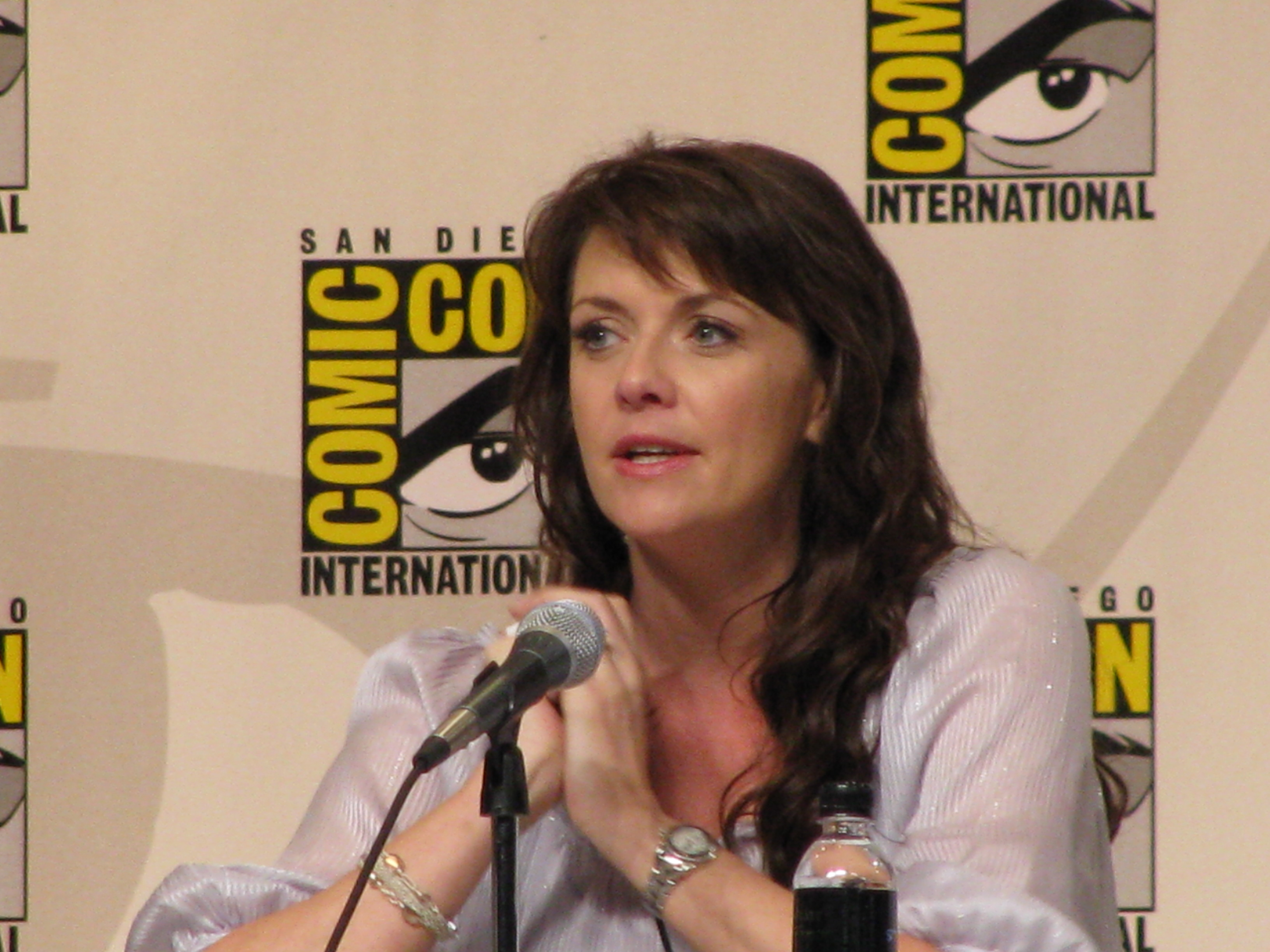
Amanda Tapping convinced the Sci Fi Channel to release "Fata Morgana" as the third episode rather than the originally intended fourth. She also directed some scenes when Martin Wood became unavailable.

"Fata Morgana" was originally released as the back half of the eight original webisodes. The episode was given an ancient and mythological feel to set the intended tone of Sanctuary. During the original writing, director and executive producer Martin Wood brought up the idea of incorporating the Morrígan from Irish mythology into the episode. Writer Damian Kindler researched the subject and named the episode after Fata Morgana as a reference to the Morrígan. During pre-production, the producers decided that around half of the episode would contain footage from the webisodes, and the other half would be rewritten to improve the storyline. Since they felt that Ashley Magnus was previously underused, they included her more into the storyline. The ending from the original webisodes, where the sisters manage to escape, was also rewritten.

"Fata Morgana" was originally scheduled to be the fourth episode in the first season. However, it was moved up to the third after Amanda Tapping felt strongly that it would make a great start-stand alone episode after "Sanctuary for All". She also cited continuity reasons, as the characters appeared more comfortable with each other in the following episode, "Folding Man". Filming started in January 2007 when they were filming the webisodes. The new scenes were filmed in June 2008. The actors consciously played the characters more open to each other.

When Martin Wood became unavailable during one day of filming, Amanda Tapping filled in for him as director. Furthermore, a photo double stood in for Leah Cairns in some scenes when Cairns was unavailable to play Tatha. The outdoor scene that featured Kandyse McClure was filmed in the same slot as "Sanctuary for All", because Wood wanted to use the present rain. One scene was filmed on the same set that was previously used in Stargate SG-1. In total, "Fata Morgana" contained over 400 visual effects shots, more than any other episode in the first season. The scene where Ashley was sitting on the edge of a tall building was actually done by having Emilie Ullerup sitting on a green beam, and next to a wind machine. Every visual effects shot made for the "Fata Morgana" webisodes were remastered in the episode.

== Reception ==
"Fata Morgana" was broadcast on October 10 on Sci Fi in the United States, and October 20, 2008 on ITV4 in the United Kingdom. According to the Nielsen Galaxy Report, "Fata Morgana" received a household rating of 1.6 after original airing in the United States; this was a drop from the 2.2 rating in "Sanctuary for All". It was still placed second in the top ten Sci Fi Channel shows the week it aired, behind Ghost Hunters, which received a 2.0 rating. In the United Kingdom, the episode was seen by 471,000, placing Sanctuary number two in the top ten ITV4 viewings the week it aired, behind a live UEFA Champions League game.

Reviews for the episode were generally positive. Tory Ireland Mell of IGN rated the episode an "outstanding" 9.3 out of 10, calling it a "great episode, and completely fun to watch." Mell praised the episode for its pace, action, choreographed fight sequences, visual effects and character development, but thought that Magnus and Ashley's relationship was a little forced. Carma Spence-Pothitt of Airlock Alpha reacted positively to the episode, particularly for its use of celtic mythology, how Damian Kindler and Martin Wood incorporates it into the storyline, and the introduction to the Cabal's. Spence-Prohitt was however, critical of the fact that "too much is being crammed into one." Amber Spence of PopSyndicate also reacted positively to the episode, calling it a "much stronger showing than the [somewhat convoluted] premiere," and that the action and pace were well executed to draw in the audience. Paul Simpson of Total Sci-Fi gave a more mixed reaction to the episode, rating it 6 out of 10. Though Simpson called it the first proper episode, he didn't feel it was as strong as the pilot.
