= Helen Magnus =

Fictional character in Sanctuary

Dr. Helen Magnus
- Sanctuary character
- Amanda Tapping as Dr. Helen Magnus
- First appearance: Webisode 1 (web series) "Sanctuary for All" (TV series)
- Last appearance: "Sanctuary for None (Part 2)" (TV series)
- Created by: Damian Kindler
- Portrayed by: Amanda Tapping; Emily Tennant (Young Helen)

In-universe information
- Occupation: Head of the Sanctuary Network
- Family: Gregory Magnus (Father); Patricia Heathering (Mother)
- Significant others: John Druitt (formerly); James Watson (formerly, deceased)
- Children: Ashley Magnus (Daughter)
- Nationality: English
- Abilities: Longevity (250+ yrs); Polymath; genius-level intellect in various fields of life science, medicine, intelligence and engineering Leading Authority on "Abnormals"; Martial arts and firearms expert

Dr. Helen Magnus is the protagonist and central character of the Canadian fantasy-science fiction television series Sanctuary. She is portrayed by Amanda Tapping. In the series, Magnus is a biologist from Victorian era England, who currently runs the global Sanctuary Network, an organization tasked with finding a series of creatures called "abnormals", and later bringing them to a Sanctuary base for refuge, to protect them from the human population. The character is over two and a half centuries old, having been given her advanced longevity by injecting herself with vampire blood, as well as reliving the 20th century from temporal displacement. After traveling back in time, Magnus had to avoid people, so she isolated herself. In the season 4 finale "Sanctuary For None: Part 2", it was revealed that Magnus spent the 113 years creating a new Sanctuary.

Tapping was offered a part in the original web series by series creator Damian Kindler and director Martin Wood. It became the actress' first regular role since playing Samantha Carter on Stargate SG-1 and Stargate Atlantis for eleven years. She initially had difficulty playing Magnus as her personality greatly differed from Carter. She also dyed her hair darker and spoke with an English accent throughout the run, as she herself was born in England. In addition, Tapping serves as the series executive producer and on some occasions, director.

Magnus and Tapping's portrayal of the character received generally mixed reactions from critics, with the negative comments pointing toward's Tapping's accent. However, Tapping was nominated for four awards, one Gemini Award and three Leo Awards, for her role as Helen Magnus, winning a Leo Award for "Best Lead Performance by a Female in a Dramatic Series" in 2009 for the episode "Requiem".

== Character arc ==
=== Background ===
Helen Magnus was born on August 27, 1850 to Gregory Magnus (Jim Byrnes) and Patricia Heathering. Her father was regarded as a controversial medical researcher of his time, and exposed his daughter to his profession when she was a child. Years later, she helped form a secret group known as "the Five", along with John Druitt (Christopher Heyerdahl), Nikola Tesla (Jonathon Young), James Watson (Peter Wingfield) and Nigel Griffin (Vincent Gale) at Oxford University. Each member voluntarily injected themselves with pure vampire blood, a species that had become extinct centuries before. This granted each member unique abilities. Magnus' ability was longevity, allowing her to live several times longer than any normal human. At this point she entered a relationship with Druitt, whose ability is personal teleportation. However, he became insane and murdered several prostitutes, thereby becoming Jack the Ripper. They did conceive a child. Magnus later took the embryo and froze it.

By the turn of the 20th century, her research with the abnormal population went into full swing, and she founded the Sanctuary Network. To get the funding she needed, the Prime Minister reunited the Five to stop and kill Adam Worth (Ian Tracey), who was turned down as a sixth member and blamed the Five for the death of his daughter, from releasing a toxin in London. In the season two episode "Next Tuesday", Magnus states she was a passenger on the RMS Titanic in 1912. In July 1944, she worked with the French Resistance in Normandy to prevent the Nazis from controlling a fire elemental before D-Day. She then charged the head Sanctuary in Old City, a fictional city in the Pacific Northwest, during which she decided to use the embryo to bear her daughter, Ashley (Emilie Ullerup). On one of her expeditions, she saved a young Will Zimmerman from a dangerous abnormal, but failed to capture it before it killed his mother.

=== Season one ===
In the first season of the show, Magnus appoints an adult Will (Robin Dunne), a forensic psychiatrist who worked for the Old City Police Department, to become her new protégé, which he eventually accepts. Druitt returns to the Sanctuary to ask Magnus to cure him from an unknown affliction; Magnus tricks him into injecting poison, though Druitt escapes. Later, in "The Five", it would be revealed that Druitt survived, and Tesla was able to suppress his insanity. In "Fata Morgana", she becomes aware of an underground organization known as the Cabal, who plot to control all abnormals for their own gain, and in several episodes throughout the first season, will become her and her organization's primary focus. In "Requiem", Magnus becomes exposed to an aggressive parasite in the Bermuda Triangle when going with Will to see a group of mermaids who massacred each other because of the same parasite. To stop Magnus from killing Will and herself, Will locks her in a cabin in the submarine, and drains all the oxygen, killing her. She is later revived after Will captures the escaping parasite. In the two-part season finale "Revelations", the Cabal launch a bioweapon called "Lazarus", which causes any exposed abnormal to attack humans. To combat this, Magnus regroups the Five to Bhalasaam, a lost city, to recover the source blood (vampire blood). However, by the end Magnus is distressed to learn that the Cabal have turned Ashley against her and the team and steals the blood sample.

=== Season two ===
The second season begins six weeks after the end of the first, where Magnus works hard to defeat the Cabal and save Ashley, whom the Cabal transformed to a vampire-hybrid superabnormal, one of six tasked to destroy the Sanctuary Network. When the superabnormals arrive at the Old City Sanctuary, Magnus is able to get through to Ashley, who recognises her in time to save her from another superabnormal, and then teleports. Because an electromagnetic field is active, it would mean whoever teleports inside would be vaporized. Despite this, Magnus believes Ashley's life energy may be in the electromagnetic field's buffer. When it does not, she is forced to accept that Ashley has died. Because of her death, and other loved ones because of her longevity, she tried to find a way to age at a normal rate again. She finds an elixir used by the Mayans in Honduras, but it has the side effect of turning humans into zombie-like creatures. After being shown the potential consequences of the elixir's release by an incorporeal guardian, she decides to leave it behind.

Later on in the season, her leadership of the Sanctuary Network would be called into question by the other heads of house. In "Veritas", she sets up an elaborate scheme to apprehend a telepath named Emma (Erica Cerra), whom she suspects of working against the Network. In the scheme, Magnus forges a mental illness and fakes the murder of her butler, Bigfoot (Heyerdahl), and makes Emma believe she kept alive Big Bertha, the most dangerous abnormal on Earth, which Magnus was thought to have killed. However, it is revealed in the season finale "Kali", Magnus did indeed keep her alive in secrecy, but sedated, as she believes that killing Bertha would jeopardize the planet. When Big Bertha is being controlled by Edward Forsythe, Magnus attempts to sedate Big Bertha again, but by then, Terrence Wexford (Paul McGillion) overrides her authority and assumes control of the network. His attempt to kill Bertha only succeeds in angering her, and she launches a tsunami.

=== Season three ===
The third season begins with Magnus forcing Wexford to step down as head of the Sanctuary Network, thereby putting herself back in command, while the rest of the team deal with the tsunami. Though they are not happy that Big Bertha is still alive, the other Sanctuary house heads decide to keep Magnus in charge, while also firing Wexford for breaking several protocols. She learns from Will that when he talked to Kali, the avatar manifestation of Big Bertha, into stopping the tsunami, he saw her father, who left her clues leading to a map leading to Hollow Earth, thought to be the home of every abnormal species on the planet. In "Breach" Magnus learns Adam Worth is still alive, and he also intends to find Hollow Earth, having been there before and resurrected. After finding an entrance to Hollow Earth in Tibet, she and the team venture to the underground city of Praxis, where leader Ranna (Polly Walker) executes her and her team for trespassing. However, they are later resurrected as she wants their help in saving the city, which is facing destruction because a hyperspecies abnormal is not controlling the city's geothermal energy. After saving it, Magnus and her team and Ranna part in good terms. It is also revealed Worth also came to the city to steal a power source with unlimited capabilities. Though it was assumed Druitt killed him before he could leave with it, it is later revealed in the season finale that Druitt kept him alive and that he is using the power source to create a time machine and cure his daughter's leukemia, which could cause untold consequences on the planet. His first failed attempt causes the destruction of Praxis, and a time dilation bubble in Carentan, France. Magnus fails to stop him from succeeding, but does follow him through a time portal to London in 1898.

=== Season four ===
Magnus pursues Worth throughout London to stop him from curing his daughter Imogene, who is meant to die in the timeline. During the pursuit she tries to avoid her past self, but fails to stop encountering Watson, who quickly discovers she is from his future, but he promises to keep quiet for the sake of preserving the timeline. When Worth chases Magnus later he accidentally kills Imogene, restoring the timeline. After killing Worth, Magnus ends up in hiding for the next 113 years before she can resurface to help Will dealing with a mass of Abnormals invading the surface. In the season finale, it is revealed that Helen had been secretly working with several important figures of the 20th Century, including Albert Einstein and Buckminster Fuller amongst others, and had built a new underground Sanctuary.

== Characterization ==
The Syfy website describes Magnus as a "beautiful and enigmatic" character who has "devoted her life to the practical research of cutting edge medicine and science". Her work is to explore the world of abnormals. While the rest of the world dismissed them as monstrous figments of their imaginations and elements of childhood nightmares, Magnus realizes that they are the world's triumphs and mistakes. Magnus hence becomes their protector, but in some cases, their captor. She is also described as "bold and straightforward, brave and no-nonsense, yet she remains proudly true to her formal Victorian English sensibilities". Portraying actress Amanda Tapping described Magnus as a "crazy character" who is "very eccentric and very sexy and very unapologetic".

Magnus "adores her daughter Ashley, respecting her independence and self-reliance – but that doesn't preclude some occasional mother-daughter friction". Tapping has said that there is a "huge amount of respect" between the two characters, adding "Ashley knows that when her mother says she needs to do something then she says it for a reason. And Magnus has a huge amount of respect for Ashley because Ashley can do things that she can't." Magnus made a hard choice of having Ashley even though she does not have her mother's longevity, and Magnus would outlive her daughter. In the first season, Magnus recruits Will as her protégé. When asked what Magnus thinks of Will, Tapping stated "I think Helen finds him fascinating. He's so idealistic, she sees in him all the qualities that she admires, but all the qualities that she knows will probably get beaten out of him over the course of time. His idealism and purity of thought and the way he analyses things ... she absolutely respects that, but I think she also realises that there's going to come a time when he's going to become a bit jaded ... There are a couple of episodes where there's been this bizarre sexual tension between the two of them ... but generally there's just a huge healthy respect." During a Blastr interview in 2011, Tapping further explains Magnus' relationship with Will; "I love how this relationship has developed. [...] "It's been a really organic transformation of Will's character and Magnus. To actually bring somebody on board who, initially, it's all about teaching him the ropes. And then as the seasons have gone on he's come into his own. He's come into his own as a scientist. He's come into his own in terms of his relationship with the people in the Sanctuary." Dunne meanwhile stated "there's a nice synchronicity that has formed between the two characters. And really, they're two people that depend on each other for survival. And therefore, that's where the respect comes out of."

== Conceptual history ==
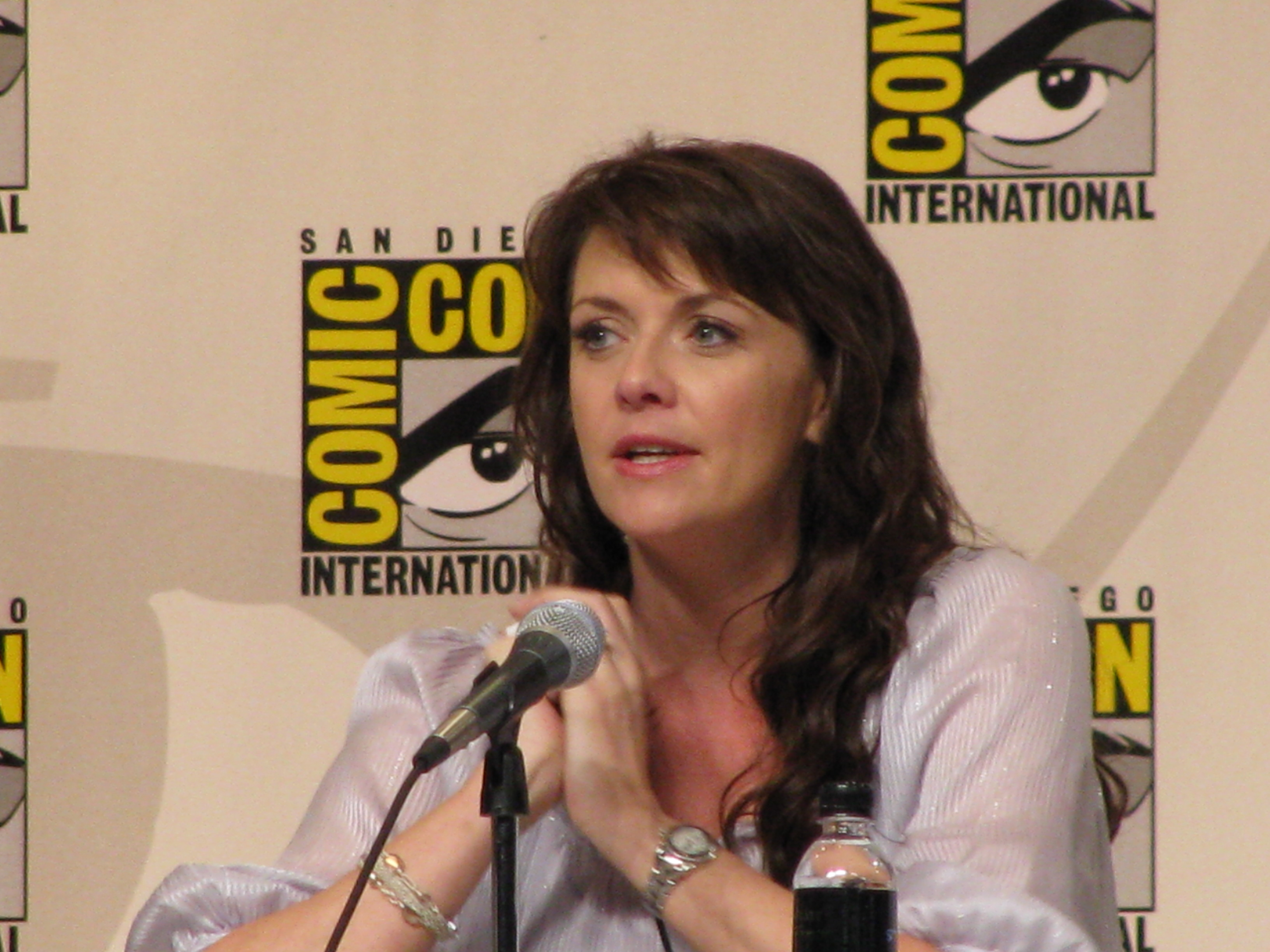
Amanda Tapping plays Magnus. It was her first regular role since appearing as Samantha Carter in the Stargate franchise for over a decade.

Series creator Damian Kindler conceived the idea of Sanctuary in 2001. Many of his ideas were included in the final product, one of them being the English scientist Helen Magnus. A few years later, Kindler asked Martin Wood if there was a potential for a series. When Wood believed it would be, they both decided to approach Amanda Tapping to participate in the project, and she accepted. Kindler believed that casting Tapping was a "nice fit" to the character because the actress was born in England. Tapping, who played the regular character Samantha Carter in Stargate SG-1 and sister show Stargate Atlantis, did not know the future of her role in the show when she was approached to appear on Sanctuary in 2006. When the webseries started shooting in January 2007, it did not conflict with her commitments on Stargate. After the fourth season of Atlantis, Tapping was offered the chance to return to the fifth season and she accepted. When Sanctuary was picked up to a television series, Tapping decided to turn down the Atlantis contract, having been encouraged by her husband to move on after playing Carter for eleven years. She went through a "weird disconnect" playing Magnus since "Sam Carter was so much a part of me". However, she was able to embrace playing a new character "pretty quickly".

Nevertheless, Tapping found it a challenge to play a different character, as Carter and Magnus have different personalities and points of view; "after playing a character like Sam Carter for so long where her physicality is so comfortable – Sam is so comfortable in her own skin and Helen is this very sexual, more mysterious being. She has a much darker edge to her and it was sort of finding that because Carter always looks on the bright side and Helen has been around so long, and has seen so much of the evil in human society if you will." Whilst filming the webisodes, Tapping wore a dark-haired wig, but when the television series was being shot, she dyed her hair to match the hair colour of the wig. Tapping spoke with an English accent throughout the run of the series. Although many of her relatives are from the United Kingdom and speak with British accents Tapping found the accent a challenge, as her character came from the Victorian era, which is a "very specific way of speaking. She clings to that eccentricity a bit, to that Britishness." The actress listened to several different voices, as she had to factor in the fact that Magnus lived all around the world.

Sanctuary was mostly filmed on virtual green screen sets. Initially Tapping went through what she called "chroma key green headaches" because she had to stare at nothing but bright green walls for the first few days. When she got used to it, she likened filming on green screen to working in theatre. In the second season her daughter, Ashley was killed off. The producers, as well as the American and Canadian networks to give the character, including Magnus, a deep and most dramatic impact. They also wanted Magnus to feel more angry and vulnerable throughout the season, especially in the first three episodes. After playing Magnus in the series' third season, Tapping admitted that she still does not get Magnus because "there's so many things about the decisions that she makes that I still can't wrap my head around, and to me that's fascinating as an actor, to try to get inside somebody so complex and so kind of confusing." In the episode "Normandy", Tapping wore a red-haired wig for Magnus during her time in the Second World War, as an homage to her late grandmother. For the fourth season, Tapping requested that Magnus would be given a new love interest. The request was granted in the form of a female virologist appearing early in the season (thus establishing Magnus's bisexuality).

In addition to being an actor, Tapping was also an executive producer on the series. However, she did not get paid extra as that salary would go towards financing the show, which was not backed up by a studio. She also served as a director on certain days if other directors were unavailable, or called in sick. In the second season, she was allowed to direct "Veritas", the seventh episode.

== Reception ==
=== Critical reaction ===
According to Mark Wilson of About.com, Amanda Tapping was enthusiastic about creating a radically different character after eleven years playing Samantha Carter in Stargate SG-1 and Stargate Atlantis, and expended tremendous effort to separate Helen from Carter as successfully as possible. Tapping was able to successfully portray a woman who's experienced a century and a half of isolation, strangeness, and relentless compassion. Rick Bentley from McClatchy Newspapers commented Tapping's role as Dr. Magnus was a way for the actor to make a name of herself outside the Stargate universe as Carter. Magnus is also described as a "non-glib, female Jack Harkness;" Jack Harkness being the main character from the British science fiction show Torchwood. Hilary Rothing of UGO said that "Dr. Helen Magnus is intelligent, alluring and has one of those tasty British accents – Victorian era to be exact. That's because she's a 157 years old. But seriously, she doesn't look a day over 35." She also added that Tapping is "right at home" taking the lead for the show. Alex Walker of Den of Geek believed Magnus was "typical for an English character in an American TV show, with a liking for tea and a cut-glass elocution betraying no hint of a regional accent". Helen Magnus has been listed number ten in TV Squad's "Ten Most mysterious characters on television".

Magnus's English accent was not well received by some critics. She was listed ninth in io9's "Worst Fake Accents From The Yanks (And Canucks) Of Science Fiction", with Meredith Woerner stating "I really want to like this new Sci Fi Channel show, especially since the monsters look amazing – but I'm worried Tapping's dreadful accent will get in the way. It sounds completely forced in all the clips I've seen so far, but I'll guess I'll have to wait until October 3 to make my full assessment." Maureen Ryan of the Chicago Tribune wondered why Tapping decided to speak with an "iffy accent," but added she would be of interest by fans of Tapping's previous works, notably Stargate. Rob Owen of the Pittsburgh Post-Gazette called Tapping's English accent "unremarkable", whilst calling the show an "unremarkable series."

=== Accolades ===
Over the course of the series, Tapping's portrayal of Magnus resulted in several award nominations. Tapping was nominated for a 2009 Gemini Award for "Best Performance by an Actress in a Continuing Leading Dramatic Role," for her role in "Requiem", but lost out to Being Erica's Erin Karpluk In the same year, Tapping won the similar "Best Lead Performance by a Female in a Dramatic Series" Leo Award for the same episode. She was nominated for the same category again in 2010 for "Pavor Nocturnus", and in 2011 for "Breach", but lost out to Erin Karpluk and Blackstone's Carmen Moore, respectively.
