= Gillian Horvath =

American television writer and producer (born 1966)

- Born: April 12, 1966 (age 60); New York City, New York, U.S.
- Education: Yale University
- Occupation: Television writer/producer
- Years active: 1989-present

Gillian Horvath (born April 12, 1966) is a television writer and producer in the United States and Canada.

== Background ==
Horvath was born and raised in New York City Her mother was a social worker; her father, producer/director Imre Horvath, was an editor and documentary producer at CBS News. Horvath attended Yale University, where she graduated cum laude from the film studies program. While attending Yale, she also held internships at NBC Entertainment and Universal Television.

== Career ==
Horvath's first story made it to television in 1989. In 1993, she joined the team of the Highlander TV series. She spent four seasons with the series, first as script coordinator and later as associate creative consultant, and she had a hand in creating some of the show's most enduring characters (including Adam Pierson and Alexa Bond). Horvath oversaw Highlander's tie-in novels and other ancillary products, and represented the series at media conventions around the world. She also edited (and contributed to) An Evening at Joe's, a collection of stories written by the cast and crew of the series.

Horvath has since served as writer-producer on a number of sci-fi and action shows, including Sanctuary and Flash Gordon. Her other notable TV writing credits include scripts for Xena: Warrior Princess, Forever Knight, Quantum Leap, and the original Beverly Hills, 90210.

During the 2007-08 WGA Strike, Horvath founded the Pink Hat Brigade, a group of female science-fiction and genre writers. Her original superhero creation, The Survivor, was introduced in the Chicks in Capes anthology of female superheroes written by women authors, published by Moonstone Books in 2011.

In 2012, Horvath developed and executive produced Primeval: New World, the North American spin-off of the UK hit series Primeval. She appeared as herself in the 2013 film FANomenon. From 2015-2016, Horvath was co-executive producer on the final season of Beauty & the Beast for The CW in 2022.

In 2022, Horvath was the show runner and head writer on Supernatural Academy, an animated series on Peacock based on the bestselling books by Jaymin Eve. Later that year, she served as co-executive producer of the award-winning Apple TV+ series Circuit Breakers.

== Writing credits ==
=== Television ===
- Miami Vice (1989)
- Quantum Leap (1992)
- Beverly Hills, 90210 (1993)
- Forever Knight (1994-1996)
- Diagnosis: Murder (1996)
- Baywatch (1997)
- Xena: Warrior Princess (1998)
- Shadow Raiders (1999)
- Queen of Swords (2001)
- MythQuest (2001)
- Beastmaster (2002)
- Adventure Inc. (2002-2003)
- Largo Winch (2003)
- Andromeda (2004-2005)
- Young Blades (2005)
- Painkiller Jane (2007)
- Flash Gordon (2007-2008)
- Sanctuary (2010-2011)
- The Haunting Hour: The Series (2011-2012)
- Primeval: New World (2012-2013)
- Olympus (2015)
- Beauty and the Beast (2015-2016)
- Ships in the Night: A Martha's Vineyard Mystery (2021)
- Supernatural Academy (2022)

=== Film ===
- Highlander: Endgame (2000)
- On the Other Hand, Death (2008)

== Awards and nominations ==
Horvath's episode of Beverly Hills, 90210, "Perfectly Perfect," earned the 1993 Scott Newman Drug Abuse Prevention Award for its depiction of diet-pill abuse. Her 2008 detective feature, On the Other Hand, Death, was nominated for a 2009 GLAAD Media Award for Outstanding Television Movie. Her script "The Book of Ruth" was recognized as one of 2019's top television pilot scripts on WeForShe's 5th annual WriteHer List. One of Horvath's episodes of Circuit Breakers, "Secret Ingredient," won the 2023 Leo Award for Best Screenwriting, Youth or Children's Program or Series, and the show itself won the 2023 Leo Award for Best Youth or Children's Program or Series.
