= James Thorpe (TV producer) =

James Thorpe is a Canadian television producer and television writer.

== Career ==
James Thorpe began his career writing, producing and directing series and special programming for several television stations in Canada. He received international acclaim with over 35 awards for writing and producing (International Film & TV Festival of New York Award, the Can-Pro Award, and two international BPME Awards (Broadcast Promotion & Marketing Executives)).

Later Thorpe worked for CBS Television Network in the United States. He wrote and produced campaigns for such popular television programs as Murder, She Wrote, The Cosby Show, Murphy Brown and many others. During his five years at CBS, Thorpe received numerous awards, including three Emmy Awards, six Telly Awards, five Beatty Awards, two International Film & TV Festival Awards, and the Clio Award.

After moving to Los Angeles, he focused solely on script writing. He worked for the Warner Brothers Studio. Since then, he is writing and producing in North America and Europe for both film and television, including series such as Outer Limits, Highlander, The Lost World, Queen of Swords, Relic Hunter, Adventure Inc., Young Blades, The Jane Show, Flash Gordon, Wild Roses and Sanctuary. He also wrote a novel in a new mystery/detective series.
