= Steven A. Adelson =

American film director

- Occupations: Film director, television director
- Years active: 2008–present

Steven A. Adelson is an American film director and television director.

== Filmography ==
- FUBAR
- Motherland: Fort Salem
- Katy Keene
- The Code
- Siren
- Dynasty
- Riverdale
- Training Day
- Beyond
- Scorpion
- Sleepy Hollow
- Sanctuary
- Nikita
- Haven
- The Tomorrow People
- The Lottery
- Helix
- Zoo
- The Blacklist
- The Player
- Beauty & the Beast
- Debris
- Claws
- SkyMed

Besides directing, Adelson worked as a camera operator on the films Jingle All the Way, The Players Club, the Christopher Nolan films Insomnia, Batman Begins, among others. He is alumnus of Syracuse University school of Visual And Performing Arts.
