= Panou =

Canadian actor

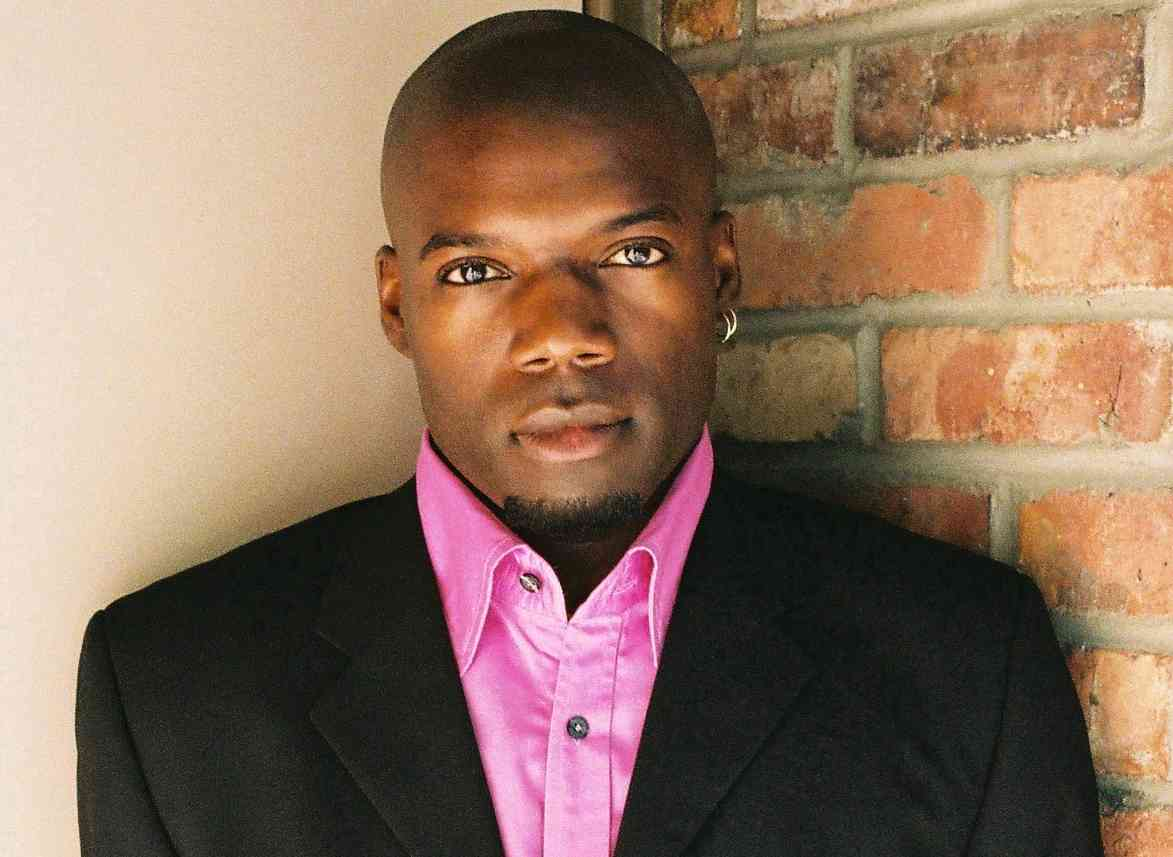
- Panou
- Born: Haiti
- Occupation: Actor

Panou is a Canadian actor.

== Biography ==
His birth-name translates to 'God Among Us' in his native Creole. His first feature film was Trial of a Serial Killer in 1997; he has since had roles in such film projects as X-Men Origins: Wolverine, Steal This Movie! (as Bobby Seale), the independent feature Fizzy Bizness, and the feature film The Invisible. Panou has also appeared in television shows including Caprica, I Was A Sixth Grade Alien, Stargate SG-1, and Stargate Atlantis.

== Filmography ==
- Love Happens
- Caprica
- X-Men Origins: Wolverine
- Flash Gordon (TV) (2007)
- I Was A Sixth Grade Alien
- This Means War
- Stargate Atlantis
