= Sanctuary (Canadian TV series) =

Canadian science fiction-fantasy TV series (2008–2011)

- Title card used in Seasons 2–3
- Created by: Damian Kindler
- Based on: Sanctuary by Damian Kindler
- Starring: Amanda Tapping; Robin Dunne; Emilie Ullerup; Christopher Heyerdahl; Ryan Robbins; Agam Darshi
- Theme music composer: Joel Goldsmith (seasons 1–2); Andrew Lockington (seasons 3–4)
- Composers: Ian Browne (season 1); Andrew Lockington (season 2–4)
- Country of origin: Canada
- Original language: English
- No. of seasons: 4
- No. of episodes: 59 (TV episodes); 8 (webisodes) (list of episodes)

Production
- Executive producers: Damian Kindler; Amanda Tapping; Martin Wood; Keith Beedie; N. John Smith; Sam Egan; Andrea Gorfolova; Carrie Mudd
- Production locations: Burnaby, British Columbia, Canada
- Running time: 43–48 minutes
- Production companies: The Beedie Group; Bell Media (seasons 3–4); My Plastic Badger (season 2–4); Sanctuary 2 Productions (season 2); Sanctuary 3 Productions (season 3); Sanctuary 4 Productions (season 4)

Original release
- Network: Syfy (United States); The Movie Network (Canada, season 1); Movie Central (Canada, season 1); Space (Canada, season 2–4)
- Release: March 14 – August 30, 2007
- Release: October 3, 2008 – December 30, 2011

Sanctuary is a Canadian science fantasy television series created by Damian Kindler. It aired on Syfy in the United States between 2008 and 2011, for all four seasons and a total of 59 episodes. The series also aired in Canada on The Movie Network and Movie Central for the first season, and on Space for seasons 2–4.

The show is an expansion of an eight-webisode series that was released through the Internet in early 2007. Seeing the success of the web series, Syfy decided to buy the broadcast rights to the series and pay to re-stage the series in a season of thirteen episodes.

The show centres on Dr. Helen Magnus, a 157-year-old teratologist, and her team of experts who run the Sanctuary, an organization that seeks out extraordinarily powerful creatures and people, known as Abnormals, and tries to help and to learn from them while also having to contain the more dangerous ones.

The series premiered on October 3, 2008, in both Canada and the United States and on October 6 in the United Kingdom. The premiere drew in more than 3 million viewers, making it the highest rated original series premiere for Syfy since Eureka debuted in July 2006. The premiere two-parter, "Sanctuary for All", was a combination and rewriting of the first four webisodes and was followed by "Fata Morgana", based on Webisodes 5-8. Amanda Tapping, with all of the original cast from the web series, made the transition to the television series. A second season of 13 episodes aired in 2009–10, and Sanctuary was renewed for a third season of 20 episodes on December 12, 2009. The second season premiered on Friday, October 9, 2009, in the 10 pm timeslot. In Australia, the program debuted on Pay Television's Sci Fi and on free-to-air channel ABC2, where Season 1 started on March 1, 2010, each Monday at 9:30 pm. Season 2 commenced on July 12, 2010, in the same timeslot. Season 3 premiered Friday, October 15, 2010, on Syfy in its original 10 pm timeslot. In January 2011, Sanctuary was renewed for a fourth season, which finished airing on December 30, 2011. On May 21, 2012, Syfy announced that Sanctuary would not be returning for a fifth season and that the show had been cancelled. On October 8, 2012, PPI Releasing announced that it would distribute the series in U.S. syndication, starting in fall 2013.

As of 2021, the series is available to watch for free with ads on Vudu, FreeVee via Amazon Prime, Tubi, and Plex. and Pluto TV.

== Series overview ==
Sanctuary follows the exploits of Dr. Helen Magnus (Amanda Tapping) and her quest to protect various cryptids, legends, and abnormal animals/people with certain extraordinary powers and abilities (which most people would consider "monsters"). She heads the Sanctuary Network, which consists of large facilities known as "Sanctuaries" scattered throughout the world serving as safe havens for these "Abnormals". She is initially aided in her quest by her reluctant protégé Will Zimmerman (Robin Dunne); her intrepid, if somewhat reckless, daughter Ashley (Emilie Ullerup); the talkative geek and lycanthrope Henry Foss (Ryan Robbins), a computer and security expert; and her taciturn, Homo heidelbergensis-like assistant, played by Christopher Heyerdahl (whose character is unnamed, but listed as "Bigfoot" in the show's credits).

=== First season ===
The history of Dr. Magnus is gradually revealed. In her youth she was trained by her father, a gifted Victorian-era scientist, to study the world and protect the unusual. Helen was a member of a group of experimental scientists known as "The Five", which also included Nikola Tesla (Jonathon Young), Nigel Griffin, Dr. James Watson (Peter Wingfield), and Magnus' lover John Druitt (Heyerdahl again), who wanted to push the boundaries of their understanding of the physical world through unconventional means. At some point during their partnership, Magnus acquired a vial of untainted vampire blood and used it in a serum that "The Five" injected into themselves. After the injection, they each developed Abnormal traits: Magnus experienced drastically slowed aging, and longevity with no clear limit; Nigel Griffin acquired the power to become invisible at will; Dr. James Watson's intellect was tremendously heightened; Nikola Tesla underwent transformation into a vampire, with the additional power of electrical manipulation; John Druitt developed longevity and the ability to teleport through time and space, but, already unstable and soon possessed by a malevolent energy creature (explained Season 2 Episode 11), he was driven to give in to his dark impulses, and becomes Jack the Ripper.

Episode 3 introduces "the Cabal", a powerful shadow organization that captures, studies, and experiments on Abnormals, in the belief that the Abnormal population is a threat to the human species. During the first-season finale, "Revelations", they test a small amount of a biological weapon named Lazarus that causes all types of Abnormals to become extremely violent, attacking anyone nearby and then dying painfully. This is part of The Cabal's overall plan to incite humanity against the Abnormals so that they can wipe out the entire Abnormal population and gain greater influence over humanity. They brainwash Ashley, and in season two, convert her into a vampiric supersoldier, using her as a template for a small army which attacks the Sanctuary network. Against all odds, Magnus and her teams stop them at the Old City Sanctuary, and Ashley, in a moment of clarity, apparently sacrifices herself. Her father, Druitt, hunts down and kills the heads of the Cabal, which seems to disband.

=== Second season ===
As season two progresses, Magnus grapples with denial, then grief, and finally accepts the loss of Ashley. Meanwhile, the team adjusts to newcomer Kate Freelander (Agam Darshi), a former freelance Cabal operative. They also deal with their relationships (Magnus's in particular) to the remaining members of the Five, and increased international coordination in the wake of the Cabal's attacks on the Global Sanctuary Network that Magnus had established. It emerges that an enormous marine Abnormal, Big Bertha, had been preserved rather than euthanized by Magnus, and that Bertha is, somehow, a sapient being named Kali existing on a psychic or spirit plane, intricately tied to nature and Abnormals around the world. At the end of the second season and beginning of the third, a man named Edward Forsythe (Callum Blue) tries to take control of Bertha, and NY Sanctuary House Head Terrence Wexford (Paul McGillion) goes rogue trying to destroy her, even attempting to depose and kill Magnus.

=== Third season ===
Ultimately, Bertha/Kali is saved and Wexford is ousted, but more questions are raised than answered. Will visits the spirit plane via induced cardiac arrest, and while there he sees two other powerful beings in addition to Kali; encounters Helen's father, who gives Will a message for her; and then spontaneously returns to life with no brain damage after an unprecedented length of time. The Sanctuary team speculate that the beings are avatars of Abnormals as powerful as Big Bertha, one of which may have been the source of the earthquake that stopped a destructive tidal wave started by Kali's wrath. Meanwhile, Gregory Magnus's message leads the Sanctuary team to old birthday gifts that he had given to Helen years before, which in conjunction produce a tangible holographic map or miniature representing an unknown steampunk-style city. This is eventually revealed to be Praxis, an advanced underground civilization of humans and Abnormals. After an initial period of mistrust (exacerbated by the antics of Adam Worth (Ian Tracey), an old enemy of Helen's who inspired Jekyll and Hyde), Helen and her team save the world and reach an entente, with Gregory acting as ambassador. However, the peace does not last long. Worth, who escaped, manipulated unhappy Abnormals in Praxis while experimenting with a dangerously unstable energy source to power a time machine. The end results of his machinations were the destruction of Praxis, several armies of displaced Abnormals marching on the upper world, and his escape to the past to attempt to save his daughter, with Magnus hot on his heels.

=== Fourth season ===
Magnus is able to thwart Worth and prevent any major changes to the timeline, then returns to the present by living through the intervening years again. She and her team manage to end the Abnormal assault on humanity without too much bloodshed, but still must contend with increasing persecution from the Special Counter-Insurgency Unit (SCIU), an anti-Abnormal agency. Magnus is forced to cut the Sanctuary network's ties to the UN, reputable banking institutions, etc. in order to maintain independence, a move made possible by her extensive preparations during her second trip through the twentieth century. Additionally, a number of Hollow Earth Abnormals refuse to remain quietly underground and engage in terrorist activities against humans. Matters come to a head when a contingent of these Abnormals, led by Caleb, agree to cease their violent activities in exchange for Magnus' help in establishing a homeland in Old City. She agrees, but SCIU is highly suspicious due to the group's former attacks. This skepticism proves justified, since Caleb plans to release a substance that would bring out latent Abnormal traits in normal humans, effectively eradicating the species. Magnus is also prepared for this betrayal, taking Caleb out with a massive explosion that destroys the Sanctuary. Now presumed dead, she is free to begin anew in an Edenic underground city based on the work of Buckminster Fuller and Albert Einstein, one last secret from her repeated century.

Season	Episodes	Originally aired		DVD release date			Blu-ray release date
Season	Episodes	Season premiere	Season finale	Region 1	Region 2	Region 4	Blu-ray release date
W	8	March 14, 2007	August 30, 2007	September 15, 2009	October 12, 2009	September 9, 2009	June 15, 2010
1	13	October 3, 2008	January 5, 2009	September 15, 2009	October 12, 2009	September 9, 2009	June 15, 2010
2	13	October 9, 2009	January 15, 2010	June 15, 2010	October 4, 2010	June 9, 2010	June 15, 2010
3	20	October 15, 2010	June 20, 2011	September 13, 2011	September 26, 2011	September 14, 2011	September 13, 2011
4	13	October 7, 2011	December 30, 2011	July 17, 2012	July 2, 2012	—N/a	July 17, 2012

== Cast ==
=== Main characters ===
- Amanda Tapping as Dr. Helen Magnus, an English medical and scientific researcher who has devoted her life to both hunting and protecting Abnormals—creatures with genetic abnormalities. She runs a "Sanctuary" in the fictional Old City, where the Abnormals may find refuge while she attempts to help them and to understand them further.
- Robin Dunne as Dr. Will Zimmerman, a forensic psychiatrist who is recruited by Dr. Magnus to help her treat Abnormals.
- Emilie Ullerup as Ashley Magnus (seasons 1–2), the daughter of Dr. Magnus and John Druitt. Ashley is an expert monster hunter, and provides a counterbalance to Dr. Magnus's desire to protect creatures.
- Christopher Heyerdahl as:
  - Bigfoot, a former Neanderthal-like patient of Dr. Magnus who would not leave after he recovered, so Dr. Magnus offered him a position at the Sanctuary as a butler, chauffeur, and body guard.
  - John Druitt, a member of "The Five" and Magnus' ex-lover
- Ryan Robbins as Henry Foss (seasons 2–4; recurring season 1), a technological wiz and lycanthrope.
- Agam Darshi as Kate Freelander (seasons 2–3; recurring season 4), a con-artist with Cabal connection who has a vast knowledge of their tactics and movements. After she is hunted by the Cabal, she reluctantly switches sides to the Sanctuary, staying on as a member of the team.

=== Recurring characters ===
- Lynda Boyd as Dana Whitcomb (seasons 1–2)
- Jonathon Young as Nikola Tesla (seasons 2–4; guest season 1)
- Robert Lawrenson as Declan Macrae (seasons 2–4)
- Ian Tracey as Adam Worth (seasons 3–4)
- Pascale Hutton as Abby Corrigan (seasons 3–4)
- Ronald Selmour as Kanaan (season 3)
- Brian Markinson as Greg Addison (season 4)
- Carlo Rota as Richard Feliz (season 4)
- Peter Wingfield as Dr. James Watson (seasons 1 & 3-4)

== Production ==
The series is produced by Stage 3 Media based in Vancouver, British Columbia, founded in 2006. The webisodes were filmed from January 3 to January 31, 2007, at Bridge Studios. Sanctuary is filmed almost entirely using the green screen technique. Unlike many other shows, no elaborate sets are built for the scenes to be filmed; instead, they are created using CGI technology. Production on the television version of Sanctuary began in early 2008, with a reshooting of the pilot episode, "Sanctuary for All". The first season cost an estimated CA$21 million, and filmed in Burnaby, British Columbia. In December 2008, the series was confirmed to have been picked up for a second season of thirteen episodes. The second season began production in the end of March/beginning of April, 2009. Guest stars for the second season include Agam Darshi, who will play con-artist Kate Freelander, former Stargate SG-1 actor Michael Shanks as Jimmy for the ninth episode, entitled "Penance", and former Stargate Atlantis actor Paul McGillion, who will play Wexford, a character he played in the webseries, in the final two episodes.

Sanctuary is the first television series in North America to use the RED camera exclusively. The RED camera system does away with tape and film and records straight to a hard drive allowing the Anthem Visual Effects and the series' post production team immediate access to the day’s footage, and is capable of recording at resolutions up to 4096 horizontal by 2304 vertical pixels, four times the resolution of current day HD. Along with being a primary cast member, Amanda Tapping is also an executive producer on the show, but according to Tapping herself in an interview with The Today Show, she does not get paid extra as an executive producer, mainly because what salary the executive producers would get would go towards paying for the sets, because the series is not backed up by a studio. Although heavily reliant on virtual sets, a few episodes in the first season, including "Kush" and "Requiem", were filmed on practical sets, including the fuselage of an aircraft. The series also took a different filming style for the Cloverfield-esque "Instinct".

== Broadcast and release ==
Unlike traditional TV series, the primary distribution channel for Sanctuary was originally the Internet. Episodes were sold directly to viewers on the official website. The web episodes or "webisodes", are about 15–20 minutes in duration and were released bi-weekly. The success of the webisodes led the Syfy Channel to commission a 13-episode season for 2008. The first four webisodes were rewritten and reshot as a two-hour premiere episode, "Sanctuary for All". After the deal with the SciFi channel, the webisodes were moved to the Sci Fi network on Hulu.com.

In its first season on Syfy, the original series, Sanctuary has averaged a 1.9 Household rating; 1,044,000 Adults (ages 18–49); 1,371,000 Adults (ages 25–54) and 2,366,000 total viewers. The pilot episode, "Sanctuary for All" received a Nielsen household rating of 2.2, the highest rated original series premiere from Syfy since the series premiere of Eureka in July 2006. The 2.2 rating represented more than 2.7 million viewers; 1.08 million among the adult 18–49 demographic and 1.4 million among the adult 25–54 demographic. This placed Sanctuary the number one cable program among adults 25–54, and number four among adults 18–49. The ratings success also boosted the web series to 1.2 million views. In the United Kingdom, both parts placed the series first place on the top ten viewing programmes for ITV4 during the two weeks they aired. The first part was viewed by 565,000, while the second part received a higher viewing figure of 608,000.

== Home media releases ==
In Australia (Region 4 and Region B), Via Vision Entertainment acquired the rights to the series and will release "The Complete Collection" on both DVD and Blu-Ray on November 18, 2020.

DVD name	Region 1	Region 2	Region 4
Season 1	September 15, 2009	October 19, 2009	September 9, 2009
Season 2	June 15, 2010	October 4, 2010	June 9, 2010
Season 3	September 13, 2011	September 26, 2011	September 9, 2011
Season 4	July 17, 2012	July 2, 2012	August 29, 2012
The Complete Series	October 23, 2012		November 14, 2012 November 18, 2020

== Critical response ==
Sanctuary has a score of 56 on Metacritic, signifying "mixed or average reviews" based on 7 television reviewers. Tori Ireland Mell of IGN called the series an intriguing story, and a mind-blowing concept, and believes the series from a production standpoint was executed well. Some reviewers have made comparisons between Sanctuary and British science fiction series Torchwood and Primeval, as well as drawing comparisons between Dr. Will Zimmerman (Robin Dunne) and Daniel Jackson from Stargate SG-1. USA Today reviewer Bill Keveney said that Amanda Tapping had reached her "comfort zone," and continued with further positive reaction to the TV series. Rick Bentley from McClatchy Newspapers commented Tapping's role as Dr. Helen Magnus was a way for the actress to make a name for herself outside of Stargate SG-1 as character Samantha Carter.

Maureen Ryan of the Chicago Tribune described the show as "competent if not particularly innovative sci-fi," and said that the series might be of interest to fans of Tapping's earlier works. Mike Hale of The New York Times believed that the series does not have "the narrative force of Battlestar Galactica or the wit and creativity of Eureka," further stating "it's not an embarrassment for the channel, but it doesn't raise the stakes either."

Sanctuary has been nominated for six Constellation Awards. The series has also been nominated for ten Leo Awards and won four of these in 2009.
