= Amanda Tapping =

Canadian actress and director (born 1965)

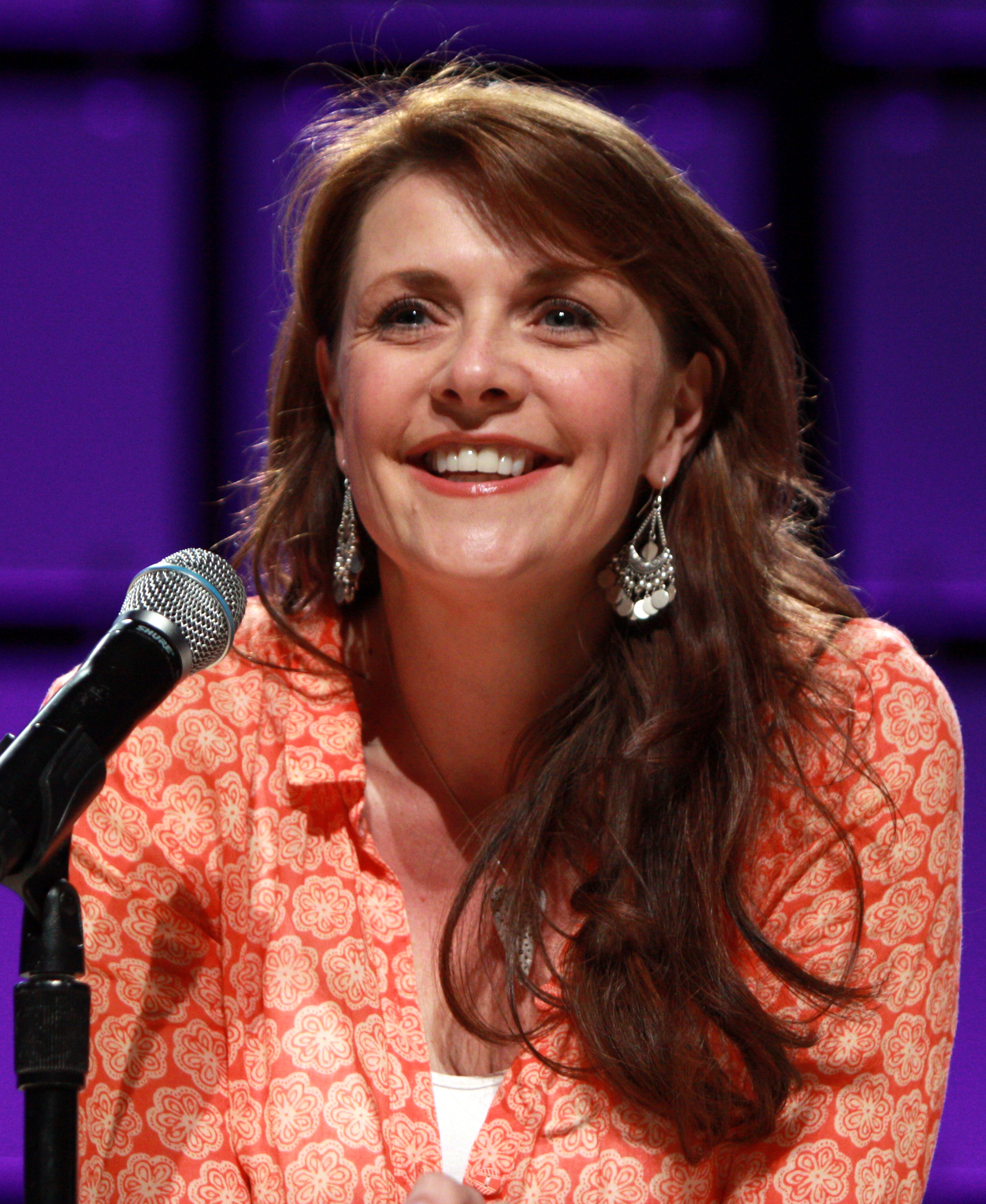
- Tapping at the Phoenix Comicon, 2013
- Born: 28 August 1965 (age 61); Rochford, Essex, England
- Citizenship: United Kingdom; Canada
- Education: University of Windsor
- Occupations: Actress; director
- Years active: 1986–present
- Spouse: Allan Kovacs
- Children: 1
- Website: amandatapping.com

Amanda Tapping (born 28 August 1965) is a Canadian actress and director. She is best known for portraying Samantha Carter in the Canadian–American military science fiction television series Stargate SG-1, Stargate Atlantis, and Stargate Universe. She starred as Dr. Helen Magnus in the science fiction-fantasy television series Sanctuary, which she also produced.

== Early life ==
Born in Rochford, Essex, England, Tapping moved with her family to Ontario, Canada, when she was three years old. She attended North Toronto Collegiate Institute, where she excelled in environmental science and drama. When she finished in 1984, she decided to focus her attention on drama, graduating from the University of Windsor School of Dramatic Arts in Windsor, Ontario.

== Career ==
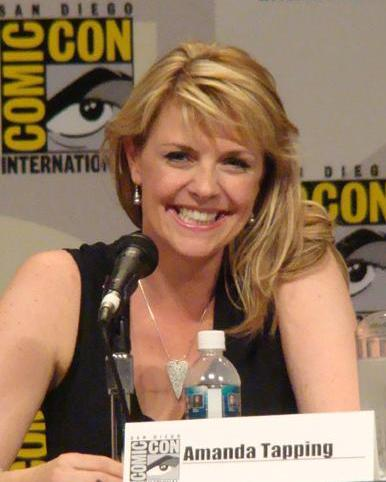
Tapping at Comic Con 2007 in San Diego

After graduation, Tapping continued to study theatrical arts while performing in several stage productions. She appeared in several television commercials and played a variety of roles in television and film productions, such as episodes of The Outer Limits and The X-Files. She also formed a comedy troupe, the "Random Acts", with collaborators Katherine Jackson and Anne Marie Kerr, in Toronto in the early 1990s.

Tapping is best known for her portrayal of Samantha Carter in the science fiction television series Stargate SG-1, which debuted in 1997. She appeared in a main role in all ten seasons of the series. After SG-1 concluded, Tapping reprised the role of Samantha Carter on Stargate Atlantis in the fourth season. In season 5, Tapping's role on the show was reduced to that of "special guest-star" with only occasional appearances. Tapping chose to focus her attention on the development of a new series called Sanctuary. The show debuted as an original series of eight webisodes released on the internet in 2007, and was later picked up by Syfy as a television series. The bulk of the scenery and characters were entirely green screen and CGI creations. Tapping served as both star and executive producer of the show.

In 2007, she won a Canadian Comedy Award for Best Actress for her role in the short film Breakdown.

On 18 September 2012, she was cast as an angel named Naomi on season 8 of the TV series Supernatural. She was a recurring character who appeared in seven episodes. She reprised the role in season 13's "Funeralia", nearly five years after the character's apparent death.

She was also named as ACTRA's 2015 Woman of the Year.

=== Directing ===
Tapping's directing debut was during the seventh season of Stargate SG-1 in an episode titled "Resurrection", written by co-star Michael Shanks. She also directed the Sanctuary season two episode "Veritas". She has directed three episodes of Primeval: New World, three episodes (2.12; 3.06; 3.07) of Continuum, and four episodes of Olympus and more recently episodes of Dark Matter, Van Helsing, The Magicians, and Supernatural, as well as the historical drama X Company. She directed five episodes of the Netflix series Travelers (in which she had a recurring role as Dr Perrow), and the season finale of the 2017 series Anne with an E. In 2022, Tapping also directed two episodes of the television series Motherland: Fort Salem. Amanda recently directed S1 E 4 and E7 of Crew Girl on Netflix.

== Personal life ==
Tapping is married to Allan Kovacs and they live together in Vancouver, British Columbia. Tapping has one daughter with Kovacs. Tapping has openly shared the difficult experiences she has undergone through eight miscarriages during her marriage in hope that her story would help other miscarrying women feel less isolated.

Tapping has three brothers, one of whom suffered from epilepsy, often had uncontrollable seizures, and died in December 2006 of causes unreleased by the Tapping family.

== Filmography ==
=== Film ===
Year	Title	Role	Notes
1995	The Donor	Cassie	
1996	What Kind of Mother Are You?	Ingrid Elstad	
1997	Booty Call	Dr. Moore	
2001	The Void	Prof Eva Soderstrom	
2002	Stuck	Liz	
2002	Life or Something Like It	Carrie Maddox	
2012	Space Milkshake	Valentina	
2012	Random Acts of Romance	Dianne	
2012	Taken Back: Finding Haley	Susan	
2013	Hell in a Handbag	Mother Superior	
2014	Kid Cannabis	Teressia Lee Franks	
2018	Woodland	Donna	Voice
2024	Levels	MEL	Voice

=== Television ===
Year	Title	Role	Notes
1995	Forever Knight	Dr. Naomi Ross	"Near Death"
1995	Degree of Guilt	Marcy	TV film
1995	Net Worth	Colleen Howe	TV film
1996	Side Effects	Dr. Barbara Bertrand	"Easy Breathing"
1996	Goosebumps	Mrs. Merton	"It Came from Beneath the Sink"
1996	Due South	Audrey McKenna	"Starman"
1996	The Haunting of Lisa	Gina / Angel	TV film
1996	Kung Fu: The Legend Continues	Annie	"Shaolin Shot"
1996	The X-Files	Carina Sayles	"Avatar"
1996	Golden Will: The Silken Laumann Story	Kathryn Laumann	TV film
1996	Remembrance	Linda	TV film
1996	The Newsroom	Lindsay Ward	"Dinner at Eight"
1996–1997	Flash Forward	Miss Yansouni	Recurring role
1997–2007	Stargate SG-1	Samantha Carter; Replicator Carter	Main role Recurring role (season 8)
1998	The Outer Limits	Cmdr. Kate Girard	"The Joining"
1999	Millennium	Dr. Cantor	"Borrowed Time"
2001	The Void	Prof. Eva Soderstrom	TV film
2004	Traffic	Home Owners Wife	TV miniseries
2005	Earthsea	Lady Elfarren	TV miniseries
2005–2009	Stargate Atlantis	Col. Samantha Carter	Guest role (seasons 1–3 and 5); Main role (season 4)
2006	Engaged to Kill	Det. Burns	TV film
2007–2011	Sanctuary	Dr. Helen Magnus	Main role
2008	Stargate: The Ark of Truth	Col. Samantha Carter	TV film
2008	Stargate: Continuum	Col. Samantha Carter	TV film
2009	Dancing Trees	Josephina Rooney	
2009–2010	Riese: Kingdom Falling	Narrator	Main role
2009–2010	Stargate Universe	Col. Samantha Carter	"Air: Part 1" & "Incursion: Part 1"
2010	Canadian Comedy Shorts	Mary Johnson	"Breakdown"
2012	Taken Back: Finding Haley	Susan	TV film
2012–2013, 2018	Supernatural	Naomi	Recurring role
2013	Motive	Dr. Kate Robbins	"The One That Got Away"
2014	Package Deal	Jillian	"Danny's New Job", "Everybody Loves Beth"
2015	Killjoys	Dr. Jaeger	"Kiss Kiss, Bye Bye"
2017–2018	Travelers	Dr. Perrow	Recurring role (seasons 2–3)
2022	Motherland: Fort Salem	The Mother	Episode: "Revolution Part 2"

=== Director ===
Year	Series	Episode(s)
2004	Stargate SG-1	"Resurrection"
2009–2011	Sanctuary	Three episodes
2012–2013	Primeval: New World	Three episodes
2013–2014	Arctic Air	Three episodes
2013–2014	Continuum	Three episodes
2014	Strange Empire	"Other Powers"
2015	Family for Christmas	Hallmark Channel film
2015	Olympus	Four episodes
2015–2016	Dark Matter	Two episodes
2015–2017	X Company	Four episodes
2016	The Magicians	"Remedial Battle Magic"
2016	The Romeo Section	"Seeds of War"
2016	Van Helsing	Four episodes
2016–2018	Travelers	Nine episodes
2017–2020	Anne with an E	Four episodes
2017	Reel Women Seen	Short
2017–2019	Supernatural	Four episodes
2018–2019	Siren	Two episodes
2019	Blindspot	"Masters of War 1:5 – 8"
2019	The 100	"Matryoshka"
2020–2022	Motherland: Fort Salem	Seven episodes
2020	The Flash	"Pay the Piper"
2020	Batwoman	"O, Mouse!"
2020	Chilling Adventures of Sabrina	"Chapter Thirty-Three: Deus Ex Machina"
2022	First Kill	Two episodes
2023	The Irrational	"Lucky Charms"
2024	Wild Cards	Three episodes
2024	Dead Boy Detectives	"The Case of the Two Dead Dragons"
2024–2025	Murder in a Small Town	Four episodes

== Theatre ==
- The Wizard of Oz
- The Lion in Winter as "Alais Capet"
- Steel Magnolias – West End Theater
- Look Back in Anger as "Alison" (1986)
- Children of a Lesser God as "Sarah" (1987)
- The Taming of the Shrew as "Bianca" (1988)
- Noises Off
- The Shadow Walkers

== Awards and nominations ==
Tapping has won six awards, out of thirteen nominations.

Year	Award	Category	For	Result
2000	Leo Award	Best Performance by a Female in a Dramatic Series	Stargate SG-1: "Point of View"	Nominated
2000	Saturn Award	Best Supporting Actress on Television	–	Nominated
2001	Gemini Award	Best Performance by an Actress in a Continuing Leading Dramatic Role	Stargate SG-1: "2010"	Nominated
2001	Saturn Award	Best Supporting Actress on Television	–	Nominated
2002	Leo Award	Dramatic Series: Best Lead Performance – Female	Stargate SG-1: "Ascension"	Won
2002	Saturn Award	Best Supporting Actress on Television	–	Nominated
2004	Leo Award	Dramatic Series: Best Direction	Stargate SG-1: "Resurrection"	Nominated
2004	Leo Award	Dramatic Series: Best Lead Performance by a Female	Stargate SG-1: "Grace"	Won
2004	Saturn Award	Best Supporting Actress on Television	–	Won
2005	Leo Award	Dramatic Series: Best Lead Performance by a Female	Stargate SG-1: "Threads"	Won
2007	Canadian Comedy Award	Best Actress (Film)	Breakdown	Won
2009	Constellation Award	Best Female Performance in a 2008 Science Fiction Film, TV Movie, or Mini-Series	Stargate: Continuum	Nominated
2009	Constellation Award	Best Female Performance in a 2008 Science Fiction Television Episode	Sanctuary: "Requiem"	Nominated
2009	Constellation Award	Outstanding Canadian Contribution to Science Fiction Film or Television in 2008	–	Nominated
2009	Leo Award	Lead Performance by a Female in a Feature Length Drama	Stargate: Continuum	Nominated
2009	Leo Award	Dramatic Series: Best Lead Performance by a Female	Sanctuary: "Requiem"	Won
2009	Gemini Award	Best Performance by an Actress in a Continuing Leading Dramatic Role	Sanctuary	Nominated
2010	Women of Distinction Awards	Connecting the Community	Sanctuary for Kids	Received
2012	Leo Award	Dramatic Series: Best Lead Performance by a Female	Sanctuary: "Tempus"	Nominated
2012	Jules Verne Award	Excellence exploration, environmental and cinematic achievements	Stargate SG-1	Received
