= Martin Wood (director) =

Canadian television director

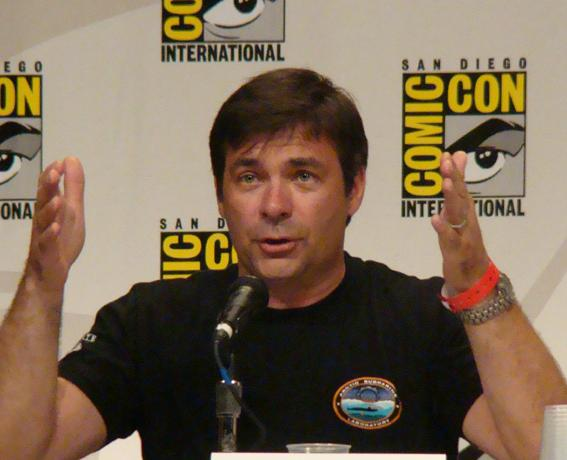
- Martin Wood at Comic-Con 2007
- Occupations: Director; Producer
- Years active: 1995 – present

Martin Wood is a Canadian television director who has been directing since the mid-1990s. He specializes in science fiction, where he is best known for his work as a director and producer on Stargate SG-1 (46 episodes), as well as its spin-off series Stargate Atlantis (30 episodes).

== Career ==
Martin Wood began his television career in 1995. Although he is best known for his work on the Stargate franchise's Stargate SG-1 and Stargate Atlantis, he has also directed for many other television series, including The Invisible Man and Earth: Final Conflict. In addition, Martin directed two TV specials on sudden infant death syndrome.

Along with Peter DeLuise, Andy Mikita and Will Waring, Wood was one of Stargate SG-1's main directors during its 10-year run. He also frequently appears as an extra known as "Major Wood" in the Stargate SG-1 episodes that he directs, often assisting Sergeant Siler as a repairman using the oversized crescent wrench that serves as an inside joke. He is also featured on many Stargate SG-1 and Stargate Atlantis DVD special features, such as featurettes and audio commentaries.

Between 2008 and 2011, Wood directed several episodes of the science-fiction series Sanctuary, starring Amanda Tapping and Christopher Heyerdahl. He was also set to direct Stargate: Revolution (working title), the third Stargate SG-1 direct-to-DVD movie, but that production has been shelved indefinitely.

== Filmography ==
Year	Title	Director	Producer	Writer	Notes
1995	The Great Run of China	check		check	Television film documentary
1995	SIDS: A Special Report!	check	check		Television film documentary Associate Producer
1996	Two	check			Episode: "Armies of the Night"
1997	Listen Up	check	check	check	Television film
1997	Life and Times	check		check	Episode: "No Time to Wave:The Life and Times of Ben Wicks"
1997	40,000 Years of Dreaming		check		Television film documentary Associate Producer
1997–1999	Silk Stalkings	check			3 episodes
1998–2006	Stargate SG-1	check	check		47 episodes (Director); 22 episodes (co-producer)
1999	Pierre Berton: Canada's Arrogant Icon	check			Television film
1999	Teenage Space Vampires	check		check	
1999	Vicki Gebereau: The Mouth That Roared	check			Television film
2000	SIDS: Uncovering the Mystery	check		check	Television film
2001	The Impossible Elephant	check			
2001	The Invisible Man	check			Episode(season 2): "The Three Phases of Claire"
2001–2002	Earth: Final Conflict	check			2 episodes (season 4); 2 episodes (season 5)
2002	Just Deal	check			Episode (season 3): "Over the Net"
2002–2003	Jeramiah	check			6 episodes
2002	1800 Seconds: Chasing Canada's Snowbirds			check	Documentary
2003–2004	Andromeda	check			5 episodes
2004–2008	Stargate Atlantis	check	check		29 episodes (Director); 19 episodes (co-producer)
2007	Sanctuary (web series)	check	check	check	7 webisodes (Director); 8 webisodes (Executive Producer); 7 webisodes (story)
2008	Stargate: Continuum	check			Direct to video
2008–2011	Sanctuary	check	check	check	27 episodes (Director); 59 episodes (Executive Producer); 1 episode (writer); 1 episode (story)
2012–2013	Primeval New World	check	check		4 episodes (Director); 13 episodes (Executive Producer)
2013	Goodnight for Justice: Queen of Hearts	check			Television film
2013–2015	Cedar Cove	check			11 episodes
2014	Arctic Air	check			2 episodes
2015	Aurora Teagarden Mystery: A Bone to Pick	check	check		Television film
2015	Olympus	check			4 episodes
2015	Real Murders: An Aurora Teagarden Mystery	check	check		Television film
2015	Dark Matter	check			1 episode
2015–2021	When Calls the Heart	check	check		14 episodes (Director); 9 episodes (Co-Executive Producer); 33 episodes (Supervising Producer)
2016	Killjoys	check			2 episodes
2016	Chesapeake Shores	check	check		5 episodes (Director); 4 episodes (Executive Producer)
2016	Travelers	check			2 episodes
2017	Love Locks	check			Television film
2017	The Perfect Bride	check			Television film
2017	Summer in the Vineyard	check			Television film
2017	Christmas in the Air	check			Television film
2018	Last Scene Alive: An Aurora Teagarden Mystery	check	check		Television film
2018	A Summer to Remember	check			Television Film
2019	Aurora Teagarden Mysteries: A Very Foul Play	check			Television film
2019–2023	Virgin River	check			18 episodes
2020	Aurora Teagarden Mysteries: Reunited and it Feels So Deadly	check			Television film
2020	Operation Christmas Drop	check			Television film
2021	Aurora Teagarden Mysteries: Til Death Do Us Part	check			Television film
2021	Aurora Teagarden Mysteries: Honeymoon, Honeymurder	check			Television film
2022	Aurora Teagarden Mysteries: Haunted by Murder	check	check		Television film
2022	Must Love Christmas	check			Television film
2023	Double Life	check			Streaming film
2023	My Christmas Hero	check	check		Television film
2023	Holiday Road	check			Television film
2023	A Christmas for the Ages	check	check		Television film
2024	Ainsley McGregor Mysteries: A Case for the Winemaker	check	check		Television film
2024	Holidazed	check			2 episodes
2025	Ainsley McGregor Mysteries: A Case for the Yarnmaker	check	check		Television film
2025	Sullivan's Crossing	check	check		2 episodes
2025	A Make or Break Holiday	check			Television film
2026	Ainsley McGregor Mysteries: A Case for the Watchmaker	check	check		Television film

== Awards and nominations ==
Wood has won 1 award, out of 5 nominations.

Year	Award	Category	Episode/Film/Series	Result
2001	Toronto Sprockets International Film Festival for Children Audience Award	Best Feature Film	The Impossible Elephant	Won
2002	Directors Guild of Canada Team Award	Outstanding Achievement in a Television Movie/Mini-Series - Children's	The Impossible Elephant	Nominated
2004	Gemini Award	Best Direction in a Children's or Youth Program or Series	The Impossible Elephant	Nominated
2005	Leo Award	Best Dramatic Series	Stargate Atlantis	Nominated
2009	Leo Award	Best Direction in a Feature Length Drama	Stargate: Continuum	Nominated
