= Alliance (Thor album) =

Studio album by Thor
- Released: July 16, 2021
- Genres: Heavy metal, power metal
- Length: 1:07:19
- Label: Deadline Music
- Producer: Jon Mikl Thor

Thor chronology
Rising (2020)	Alliance (2021)

Professional ratings
Review scores
Source	Rating
NowSpinning	4/5
Dargedik	8/10
Metal Digest	60%

Alliance is the 39th full-length studio album by heavy metal, power metal band Thor, released through Deadline Music in 2020. It features several guest performers, such as John Gallagher (Raven), Björn Strid (Soilwork), Chris Holmes (Chris Holmes/Mean Men, Ex-W.A.S.P.), Ross "the Boss "Friedman (Ross the Boss Band, Ex-Manowar), Nina Osegueda (A Sound of Thunder), Fang VonWrathenstein (Lords of the Trident), Dan Cleary (Striker), Neil Turbin (Anthrax), and Danko Jones.

The album's first single, "The Ultimate Alliance", was released on June 9, 2021. The song features guitar solos from Chris Holmes, Ross the Boss, and John Leibel, as well as additional vocals by Nina Osegueda (A Sound of Thunder) and Fang VonWrathenstein (Lords of the Trident). A music video directed by Josh Grambo was also made to accompany the song.

== Reception ==
The album has received positive reviews from critics.

A review from Now Spinning Magazine gave a positive review, stating that "Thor still knows how to perform, on record as much as on stage, and that this album has lots to love." Concluding with saying how it's "Rocking, entertaining, and wonderful listening." Adam McCann of Metal Digest gave a mixed review of the album, saying that "While ultimately, it isn't actually the best, the guest spots stop this album from being relatively dull, and it shows that Thor is a better writer than a musician." Ending with that "'Alliance' is, however, a lot better than Thor's recent output and if you're the sort of person who doesn't need much encouragement to slip on a loincloth and pick up that Broadsword then it'll do the trick."

== Track listing ==
No.	Title	Writer(s)	Length
1.	"We Need Musclerock" (featuring John Gallagher)	John Leibel	3:00
2.	"Niflhel (Realm of the Dead)" (featuring Björn Strid)	Matt Hamilton, Tom Croxton	4:23
3.	"The Ultimate Alliance" (featuring Chris Holmes, Ross "The Boss" Friedman, Nina Osegueda & Fang VonWrathenstein)	Jon Mikl Thor, Leibel	4:11
4.	"Ode to Odin" (featuring Dan Cleary)	Thor, Tes Jedlicki, Martin Gummesson	3:22
5.	"We Will Fight Forever" (featuring Neil Turbin and Lance Reegan-Diehl.)	Thor, Kevin Stuart Swain	3:50
6.	"Because We Are Strong"	Thor, Swain	4:16
7.	"Rock Around the World" (featuring Danko Jones)	Thor, Swain, Richard Fabio	3:36
8.	"Queen of the Spiders" (featuring Frank Soda)	Thor, Swain	3:08
9.	"Power Hungry"	Thor, Swain	2:42
10.	"Bounty Hunter" (featuring Frank Meyer & Dennis Post)	Thor, Frank Meyer, Chip Wilson	4:32
11.	"Battlements" (feat. Trevor William Church)	Hamilton, Croxton	4:36
12.	"Thor vs. The Juggernaut (War of the Gods)" (featuring Sean Peck and Jaden Adair)	Leibel, Jaden Adair	4:24
13.	"Generation Now" (featuring Joey Killingsworth)	Thor, Meyer, Wilson	4:39
14.	"After the Laughter" (featuring Martin Gummesson)	Thor, Meyer, Wilson	4:07
15.	"Good Stuff" (featuring Al Harlow)	Eric Jackson Lurie, Joe Brucato	4:14
16.	"Congregate" (featuring Joey Roads & Sheldon Byer)	Hamilton, Croxton	4:27
17.	"We Will Fight Forever (Reprise)" (featuring Lance Reegan-Diehl)	Thor, Swain	3:52
Total length:			1:07:19

- Tracks 13–17 omitted from 12" vinyl release due to length restrictions.

== Personnel ==
Band

- Thor – vocals
- John Leibel – lead guitar
- Matt Hamilton – rhythm guitar
- Kevin Stuart Swain – guitar, bass
- Ted Jedlicki – bass
- Tom Croxton – drums
- Richard Fabio – drums

Session members

- Jaden Adair (Risingfall, Dawn of Valor, Adora Vivos) - additional vocals (track 12)
- John Gallagher (Raven) – additional vocals (track 1)
- Björn Strid (Soilwork) – additional vocals (track 2)
- Fang VonWrathenstein (Lords of the Trident) – additional vocals (track 3)
- Nina Osegueda (A Sound of Thunder) – additional vocals (track 3)
- Dan Cleary (Striker) – additional vocals (track 4)
- Neil Turbin (Anthrax) – additional vocals (track 5)
- Danko Jones – additional vocals (track 7)
- Trevor William Church (Haunt) – additional vocals (track 11)
- Sean Peck (Death Dealer, Three Tremors, Cage) – additional vocals (track 12)
- Chris Holmes (Chris Holmes/Mean Men, Ex-W.A.S.P.) – guitars (track 3)
- Ross "the Boss "Friedman (Ross the Boss Band, Ex-Manowar) – guitars (track 3)
- Frank Soda (The Imps) – guitars (track 8)
- Frank Meyer (The Streetwalkin' Cheetahs) – guitars (track 10)
- Dennis Post (Warrior Soul) – guitars (track 10)
- Joey Killingsworth (Joecephus & The George Jonestown Massacre) – guitars (track 13)
- Martin Gummesson (Thundermaker) – guitars (track 14)
- Al Harlow (Prism) – guitars (track 15)
- Joey Roads (Roadrash) – guitars (track 16)
- Sheldon Byer (Roadrash) – guitars
- Lance Reegan-Diehl – Guitars (tracks 5, 17)
- Scott Young – Drums (tracks 5, 6, 8, 9 and 17)
- Darryl Hebert – Keys (tracks 5, 15, and 17)
- Rob Blackburn – Keys (tracks 7, 8)

Production staff

- Jaden Adair - engineering
- Ted Jedliki – engineering
- Andrew Oltmanns – engineering
- Mark Bridge – engineering
- Todd Olso – engineering
- Matt Hamilton – engineering
- Will Maravelas – engineering
- Achim Koehler – mastering, mixing
- Scott Young – mixing
- Frank Meyer – mixing, engineering, recording
- Jon Mikl Thor – executive producer
- Kevin Stuart Swain – engineering, producer
- Ted Jedliki – production co-ordinator
