= I Am Thor =

- Directed by: Ryan Wise
- Produced by: Ryan Wise, Alan Higbee
- Starring: Jon Mikl Thor, Mike Favata, Steve Price, Keith Zazzi, Rusty Hamilton
- Edited by: Ryan Wise
- Music by: Christopher Ward
- Production company: Blue Lame 61 Productions
- Distributed by: MPI Media Group
- Release date: November 20, 2015
- Running time: 82 minutes
- Country: United States

I Am Thor is a 2015 documentary about the life of bodybuilder and rock musician Jon Mikl Thor of the band Thor. The film was directed by Ryan Wise, produced by Ryan Wise and Alan Higbee, and had its world premiere at the 2015 Slamdance Film Festival.

== Synopsis ==
The film profiles Jon Mikl Thor, born in Vancouver in 1953, who competed as a bodybuilder before moving into show business, appearing in stage revues and working as a male stripper. It traces his move into music as frontman of the theatrical heavy metal band Thor, performing a self-styled variant he termed Body Rock and incorporating feats of strength into his stage act, and covers his appearances in the horror films Zombie Nightmare and Rock 'n' Roll Nightmare. The later part of the film follows his attempt, after years away from performing, to revive his music career through an extended tour.

== Release ==
After premiering at the Slamdance Film Festival in January 2015 the film then went on to screen at film festivals including Florida Film Festival, Calgary Underground Film Festival, Brooklyn Film Festival, New Zealand International Film Festival, and the Fantasia International Film Festival where it won the Audience Award for Best Documentary.

It was picked up for worldwide distribution by MPI Media Group where it was released in theaters and video-on-demand on November 20, 2015. To coincide with this release, Jon Mikl Thor went on a US tour of major cities, screening the new film followed by a live concert.

The film was released on DVD and Blu-Ray in the United States on January 19, 2016.

The film was released on DVD, Blu-ray, and VOD in Canada on March 11, 2016.

The film was released on Netflix in USA, Canada, and Scandinavia in June, 2016.

== Reception ==
The film received positive reviews from critics. It attracted an approval rating of 91% based on reviews from 11 critics on Rotten Tomatoes. ScreenAnarchy called it "a very winning documentary." Audiences Everywhere named I Am Thor one of the 10 Best Documentaries of 2015. Frank Scheck of The Hollywood Reporter called it "an entertainingly eccentric doc".
