= John Fasano =

American film director

- Born: August 24, 1961; Bethpage, New York, Long Island, New York City, U.S.
- Died: July 19, 2014 (aged 52); Studio City, Los Angeles, U.S.
- Other name: John M. Fasano
- Occupations: Screenwriter, film producer, film director
- Years active: 1984–2014
- Spouse: Edie King (m. 2013)
- Children: 2, including Lucia Fasano

John Michael Fasano (August 24, 1961 – July 19, 2014) was an American screenwriter, film producer and director.

During his career, Fasano directed six films, produced twenty more, and wrote screenplays for at least eighteen others. Fasano spent much of his career working as a script doctor, working on numerous films including Tombstone, Die Hard with a Vengeance, and Judge Dredd. With novelist Roni Keller, he also wrote the book Evie and the Golem, published in 2011. A weapons expert, Fasano was a frequent writing contributor to such authoritative magazines as Combat Tactics, and American Handgunner. Fasano was also a prolific Halloween mask designer.

== Career ==
After graduating SUNY College at Purchase in 1984, Fasano used his artistic talents art directing for magazines such as Muscle and Beauty, Race Car & Driver, Wrestling Power and OUI. He also found work painting the one sheet posters for Grindhouse films such as Tenement (Slaughter in the South Bronx) for legendary exploitation film producers Roberta Findlay and Walter Sear. Fasano rewrote and acted in their film Blood Sisters. His work impressed All in the Sex Family writer-producer-director Jack Bravman, who hired Fasano to write Zombie Nightmare on which Fasano was also an actor and reportedly uncredited co-director, starring Adam West and a young Tia Carrere.

A self-proclaimed metalhead, Fasano drew artwork for concert promotion material and heavy metal magazines, as well as directing the heavy metal-themed cult horror films Rock 'n' Roll Nightmare and Black Roses, the former of which starred Canadian singer Jon Mikl Thor. Fasano relocated to Los Angeles in 1989, where he sold his first spec script, Tailgunner, to Morgan Creek. He then co-wrote the screenplay for Another 48 Hrs. for director Walter Hill, which generated a series of script-writing offers from major studios. Fasano became a script doctor contracted to Cinergi Pictures, making major contributions to the screenplays for numerous films produced by the company, including Die Hard with a Vengeance, Tombstone, Judge Dredd, and Color of Night. Fasano was among the many writers attached to Alien 3 during its long development. While Vincent Ward was still attached to the project, Fasano expanded the writer-director's story outline into a full screenplay that was ultimately unused. In 1997, he was nominated for a WGA Award for writing The Hunchback, a television adaptation of Victor Hugo's novel The Hunchback of Notre-Dame which stylistically hearkened back to the previous 1923 adaptation. He also wrote several episodes of the television series F/X, the made-for-TV film The Hunley, and was a one-off guest writer on Profiler.

Fasano co-wrote Universal Soldier: The Return, a sequel to the original 1992 cult action film. In 2001, Fasano penned the screenplay to Megiddo: The Omega Code 2, a religious thriller film starring Michael York, and produced by the Trinity Broadcasting Network. Two years later, he returned to the horror genre as one of the writers and producers of Darkness Falls, an early outing for director Jonathan Liebesman.

Fasano wrote several television films, including Saving Jessica Lynch and Stone Cold. In 2009, he created Woke Up Dead, a horror comedy web series starring Jon Heder and Wayne Knight. His final outing as director was Kamen Rider: Dragon Knight, a tokusatsu TV series aired on The CW.

== Filmography ==
Year	Title	Director	Writer	Producer
1985	Shauna: Every Man's Fantasy	No	Yes	No
1987	Rock 'n' Roll Nightmare	Yes	Yes	No
1987	Zombie Nightmare	Uncredited	Yes	No
1988	Black Roses	Yes	No	Yes
1989	The Jitters	Yes	No	Yes
1990	Another 48 Hrs.	No	Yes	No
1992	Rapid Fire	No	No	executive
1993	Tombstone	No	No	associate
1997	The Hunchback	No	Yes	co-producer
1999	Mean Streak	No	Yes	No
1999	The Hunley	No	Yes	No
1999	Universal Soldier: The Return	No	Yes	No
1999	The Visit	No	Yes	No
1999	According to Occam's Razor	No	No	co-producer
2001	Megiddo: The Omega Code 2	No	Yes	No
2002	Ginostra	No	No	co-producer
2003	Darkness Falls	No	Yes	Yes
2003	Saving Jessica Lynch	No	Yes	No
2003	Romp	No	No	executive
2005	Cool Money	No	No	executive
2005	Jesse Stone: Stone Cold	No	Yes	No
2005	Murder at the Presidio	Yes	No	Yes
2005	Intercessor: Another Rock 'N' Roll Nightmare	No	No	executive
2005	Ladies Night	No	No	executive
2006	Firestorm: Last Stand at Yellowstone	No	Yes	No
2006	The Legend of Butch & Sundance	Yes	No	co-executive
2006	Rapid Fire	No	No	executive
2007	A Family Lost	Yes	No	executive
2007	Holiday Switch	No	No	executive
2010	Cargo: Les Hommes Perdus	No	No	consulting
2011	Sniper: Reloaded	No	Yes	No
2012	The Eleventh Victim	No	Yes	No
2012	The Lost Episode	No	No	executive
2014	Sniper: Legacy	No	Yes	No

=== Acting credits ===
Year	Film	Role	Notes
1987	Zombie Nightmare	William Washington	
1987	Blood Sisters	Larry	
1988	Student Affairs	Phillip/Moose	
1995	Irving	Big Orderly	
2004	The Legend of Butch & Sundance	Blacksmith	
2012	Hannah's Law	Marshal Deger	

=== Television ===
TV series

Year	Title	Writer	Executive producer	Creator	Notes
1996-97	F/X: The Series	Yes	No	No	Wrote 2 episodes
2000	Profiler	Yes	No	No	Wrote 1 episode
2009	Woke Up Dead	Yes	Yes	Yes	Writer, Creator, Producer
2009	Kamen Rider: Dragon Knight	No	No	No	Directed 10 episodes

Other credits

Year	Title	Role
1985	Tenement (Slaughter in the South Bronx)	"Designed movie poster
1987	Rock 'n' Roll Nightmare	creature design: child wolf creature
1987	Blood Sisters	Assistant Director
1987	Zombie Nightmare	Assistant Director
1997	Halloween...The Happy Haunting of America!	Still Photographer
2009	Universal Soldier: Regeneration	Special Costume Design (uncredited)
2011	Never Back Down 2: The Beatdown	comic book art

Uncredited revisions

- Tombstone (1993)
- Color of Night (1994)
- Die Hard with a Vengeance (1995)
- Judge Dredd (1995)
- Hostel: Part III (2011)

== Death ==
He died at his home in Los Angeles on July 19, 2014, of heart failure. At the time of his passing, he was in the midst of developing a contemporary remake of Chariots of the Gods.
