= Dame-Nation =

- Origin: Chicago, Illinois, United States
- Genres: Metal, rock, hard rock
- Years active: 2010–present
- Website: dame-nation.com

Dame-Nation is an annual rock and metal music festival with editions held in Chicago, Illinois. The music festival is dedicated to rock and metal bands with female lead vocalists. Dame-Nation is a registered trademark of Deadcenter Entertainment. Since Dame-Nation Redux 2010, the festival has been sponsored by United Kingdom-based Femme Metal Records.

In February 2010, Dame-Nation featured Ambre Lake (a winning contestant from VH1's Rock of Love with Bret Michaels, as well as a cast member of Reese Witherspoon's Sweet Home Alabama), High Gloss Black, SAGE4, F.H.O.D., Deadmanswake, Whiskey Blonde, Losing Scarlet, The Hannah Ford Band and The Pain-Kurst Girls at the Portage Theatre.

In October 2010, Dame-Nation featured Metal Sanaz, A.D.D., Circle of Fate, Deadmanswake, F.H.O.D., Wicked Soul and Beneath the Stares.

In July 2011, Dame-Nation 2011 featured returning bands Deadmanswake and Losing Scarlet as well as new performances by Avariel, Angelical Tears, Shield of Wings, A Sound of Thunder, Solarsphere, and Lindsay Schoolcraft a.k.a. Lindz Riot of Mary and the Black Lamb and later Cradle of Filth at Reggie's Rock Club.

In June 2012, Dame-Nation 2012 (or Dame-Nation IV) featured returning bands Analog Digital Disorder, Deadmanswake, Lindz Riot/Schoolcraft as well as new Dame-Nation performers including Last Red Ransom, Burning Eve, Persistence of Memory, 4 WITHOUT and Virulence Factor at The Abbey Pub in Chicago, IL.

In August 2013, Dame-Nation V (or Dame-Nation 2013) features two stages; Rock Club Stage (main stage) and the Music Joint Stage (second stage). The bands scheduled to perform on the main stage are Luna Mortis, Deadmanswake, Plague of Stars, Earthen, Anaria, and False Hope Fades. The Rock Club Stage will be hosted by Eve's Apple member Grace Meridan.

The bands scheduled to perform on the second stage are Scarlet Canary, Expired Empire, Genotype, and Killtherobotsdead. This stage will be hosted by Cradle of Filth's keyboardist and backing vocalist Lindsay Schoolcraft.

Dame-Nation V will be at Reggies Chicago on August 15, 2013.

== Past line-ups ==
=== June 30, 2012 - Chicago, IL ===
- Analog Digital Disorder
- Deadmanswake
- Burning Eve
- Schoolcraft
- Last Red Ransom
- Persistence of Memory
- 4Without
- Virulence Factor

=== July 29, 2011 - Chicago, IL ===
- Avariel
- Deadmanswake
- Losing Scarlet
- Angelical Tears
- Shield of Wings
- A Sound of Thunder (band)
- Solarsphere
- Lindz Riot of Mary and the Black Lamb

=== October 16, 2010 - Chicago, IL ===
- Metal Sanaz
- A.D.D.
- Circle of Fate
- Deadmanswake
- F.H.O.D.
- Wicked Soul
- Beneath the Stares

=== February 20, 2010 - Chicago, IL ===
- Ambre Lake
- High Gloss Black
- SAGE4
- F.H.O.D.
- Deadmanswake
- Whiskey Blonde
- Losing Scarlet
- The Hannah Ford Band
- The Pain-Kurst Girls
