= Devastation of Musculation =

Studio album by Thor
- Released: July 25, 2006
- Studio: Iron Works Studios in Kelowna, B.C
- Genre: Heavy metal, power metal
- Length: 37:20
- Label: Smog Veil
- Producer: Jon Mikl Thor, Mike Kischnick

Thor chronology
Thor Against the World (2005)	Devastation of Musculation (2006)	Into the Noise (2008)

Professional ratings
Review scores
Source	Rating
AllMusic	1.5/5 stars
Piercing Metal	3/5 stars
Ear Candy Mag	2/5 stars

Devastation of Musculation is the eighth album by Canadian heavy metal band Thor, released in 2006 on Smog Veil Records. It features new guitarist, Mike Kischnick (Empyria, Severed Serenity), who also co-wrote and co-produced the record with singer Jon Mikl Thor. Three music videos were produced to help promote the album, for the tracks "Release The Beast", "Devastation Of Musculation", and "Lords of Steel" The video for the first being included as a bonus on the CD.

Prior to its release, Jon Mikl Thor explained in a promo that:

"This is my darkest and most powerful album I've ever recorded."

== Critical reception ==
Reviews of the album have been mixed to good. One reviewer of Piercing Metal gave a good rating, stating how "Musically this is a very fun album as well, and with songs like “Lies Of Eternity”, “Cold White Ghost” and “Union Of Power” he shows that there is a solid level of musical strength to work with his lyrics and subject matter. Thor also delivers a ballad on the album in “Abandon”, which is this recording's version of “Turn To Blue” (one of the best songs off “Thor Against The World”). If you can take this CD as what it is supposed to do and that is entertain I think it's a winner and in a world that so sorely needs heroes today, isn't it nice to know that Thor walks among us?"

Ear Candy Mag called it "Slightly redeeming", with a reviewer saying how while the music isn't exactly exciting, "songs like “The Return of Odin’s Son” should make the sword-wielding, Odin-worshipping crowd fairly happy. Basically, Thor's latest release is a cheesy, bang your head as a guilty pleasure kind of disc that is as campy yet compelling as a Troma film or reality television, as songs like “Queen of The Damned” and the surprisingly tender “Don’t Abandon Me” deliciously demonstrates the fun side of heavy metal without a net."

== Track listing ==
All tracks are written by Jon Mikl Thor and Mike Kischnick, except where noted

No.	Title	Writer(s)	Length
1.	"Lords of Steel"		3:41
2.	"Devastation of Musculation"		3:40
3.	"Lies of Eternity"		3:25
4.	"Cold White Ghost"		4:36
5.	"Queen of the Damned"		3:56
6.	"Union of Power"		3:19
7.	"The Return of Odin's Son"		4:18
8.	"Release the Beast"		3:22
9.	"Abandon"		2:55
10.	"Tale of the Wolf / Warriors of the Universe"	Thor, Kischnick, Kurz	6:40

== Personnel ==
Thor

- Jon Mikl Thor – lead vocals
- Mike Kischnick – lead & rhythm guitars, keyboards, multi-instruments, backing vocals
- Ogron – bass
- Panthar – drums

Additional personnel

- John Buck – backing vocals
- Steve Bifford – backing vocals
- Kent Kynaston – drums

Production

- Jon Mikl Thor – producer
- Mike Kischnick – engineering, mixing, producer
- Craig Waddell – mastering
