= Lords of the Trident =

American heavy metal band

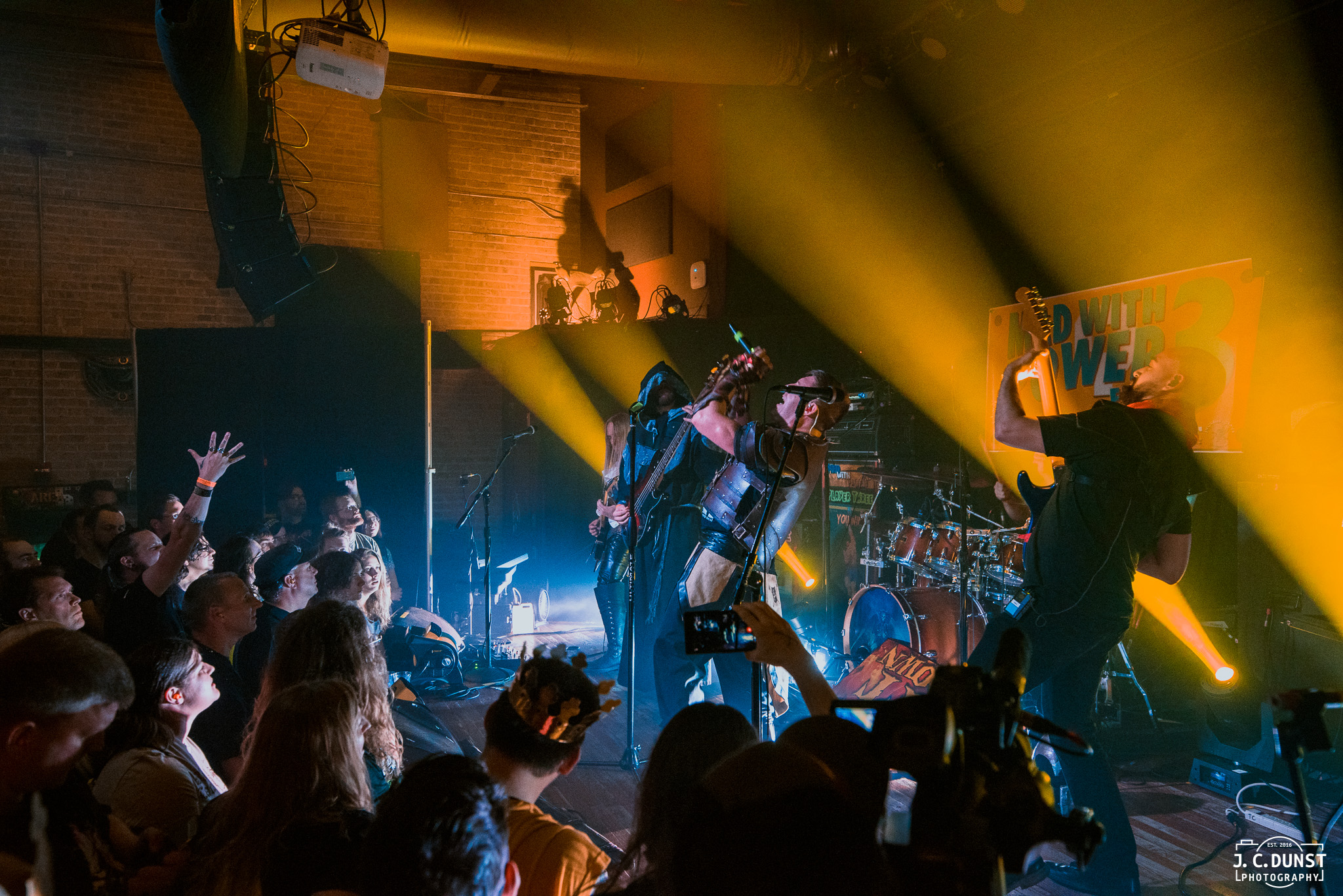
- Lords of the Trident at Mad With Power Fest 2019

Background information
- Origin: Madison, Wisconsin, U.S.
- Genres: Progressive metal; power metal; heavy metal
- Years active: 2008–present
- Labels: Junko Johnson; Killer Metal; Rafchild Records
- Members: Fang VonWrathenstein; Akira Metal; Baron Taurean Helleshaar; Pontifex Mortis; Master Hercule “Herc” Schlagzeuger
- Past members: Socrates of Shred; Danalog; Captain Bluddbeard; Korgoth; Sledge Garrotte; Killius Maximus; Dr. Dante Vitus
- Website: lordsofthetrident.com

Lords of the Trident is an American heavy metal band from Madison, Wisconsin. The five-piece band is known for its mixture of classic, power, and modern progressive metal combining strong vocals, complex instrumentation, and an expansive fantasy backstory to create energetic live shows. The band appears on-stage in armor and costumes.

Lords of the Trident have played and toured with many high-profile acts, including Dragonforce, Steel Panther, Rhapsody of Fire, Wind Rose, Psychostick, Helloween, Battle Beast, Thor, Marty Friedman, Cage, Unleash the Archers, 3 Inches of Blood, Skeletonwitch, Seven Spires, Crimson Shadows, Sleepytime Gorilla Museum, Puddle of Mudd, Mushroomhead, Saliva, Fuel, A Sound of Thunder, Seven Kingdoms, and Of Montreal.

== History ==
=== Formation, Death or Sandwich (2005–2009) ===
Lords of the Trident was formed by members Fang VonWrathenstein (Ty Christian), Akira Metal (Akira Shimada), and Socrates of Shred (Brian Cole) in 2005. The band began as a recording project and grew into a live lineup in early 2008 as Ty Christian's previous musical project was disbanding. Bassist Captain Bluddbeard (Mike Charlton) and Danalog (Dan Metzger) were auditioned and joined the band. After the first few months of performing live, the band decided to replace Danalog with a new drummer - Korgoth (Corey Larson). Shortly after, the band released their first CD, Death or Sandwich, on February 13, 2009. The CD was self-released by the band's label, Junko Johnson Records.

A few months after the release of Death or Sandwich Socrates left the band and was replaced by new guitarist Killius Maximus (Elliot Ignasiak) . Socrates went on to a career in computational biosciences at the University of Pennsylvania and Harvard University.

=== Chains on Fire (2010–2012) ===
Before the band returned to the studio to record what was to be their second album, Chains on Fire, Captain Bluddbeard left the band due to personal and musical differences and was replaced by bassist Pontifex Mortis. The band continued to tour regionally, and appeared at the Warriors of Metal III Fest in Ohio. On January 28, 2011, the band released Chains on Fire at a concert in Madison, Wisconsin which was filmed and became the accompanying DVD: Lords of the Trident - Chains on Fire Release Party 2011.

In October 2011, Korgoth left the band and was replaced by the new drummer Sledge Garrotte (Wade Schultz).

In May 2012, Lords of the Trident won a tri-state Battle of the Bands contest sponsored by Madison Media Institute, and was introduced to Martin Atkins and Doug Olson. The pair would become producers for the band's next release.

=== Plan of Attack, A Very Lords of the Trident Christmas EPs (2013–2015) ===
Under the guidance of Doug Olson (producer for Nirvana, Smashing Pumpkins, and Cheap Trick), the band quickly recorded and mixed their next release, 2013's Plan of Attack, at the Madison Media Institute studios. Additionally, the band launched a Kickstarter campaign for the album, which raised $2,508 - a little more than three times their goal of $700. Plan of Attack was released on January 6, 2013. The band toured to support the release in the summer of 2013.

In December 2013, the band released the EP A Very Lords of the Trident Christmas, which contained a collection of Christmas singles recorded for the Madison-area Christmas Compilations (MAXMas) of 2010 - 2012.

In October 2013, the band replaced drummer Sledge Garrotte with new drummer Dr. Dante Vitus (Joe Scarpelli III). In the summer of 2014, the band embarked on their second US tour, playing the Warriors of Metal VII Fest as one of the stops. This was also the first year the band appeared at Summerfest in Milwaukee, Wisconsin.

In October 2014, the City of Madison Arts Commission chose Lords of the Trident to represent the city at the BandSwap festival in Fort Collins, Colorado.

=== Frostburn, re:Quests (2015–2016) ===
The band returned to producer Doug Olson for their third album, Frostburn. Recording the majority of the album in late 2014, the band launched another Kickstarter campaign which raised $5,824 - almost double their goal of $3,000. In late 2014, the band was signed to the German record label Killer Metal Records. Frostburn was released on February 13, 2015, and became the band's best-reviewed release to date. In early 2015, Killius announced that he was leaving the band to enroll in medical school. Shortly thereafter, the lead guitar position was offered to Baron Taurean Helleshaar (Brian Koenig, formerly of Luna Mortis).

On Christmas Day 2015, the band released re:Quests, an EP of cover songs suggested by Kickstarter donors. In early 2016, the band announced their first international tour, scheduled for a string of Canadian shows in summer 2016. In late 2016, Dr. Dante Vitus announced his departure from the band due to enrolling in medical school. The band announced a new drummer had been found in December 2016.

=== Mad With Power Fest (2017) ===
Dr. Vitus left the band amicably in January 2017, and was replaced by Master Hercule “Herc” Schlagzeuger (Brett Walter) immediately thereafter. Around this time, Brian Koenig signed an agreement to produce a series of how-to shred guitar lessons for Guitar World, and released them throughout the year. During 2017, the band continued work on their next album, balancing this with multiple tour dates. Foremost was the inaugural Mad With Power Fest, a power metal festival in Madison, WI organized and run by the band. The first Mad With Power Fest was a solid success, with five bands performing and attendance breaking expectations. At the festival, the Lords of the Trident debuted their own branded Mad With Power Mead, created by Bos Meadery, and other bands released their own branded beers.

=== Mad With Power Fest II, Shadows from the Past (2018) ===
The band announced in late 2017 that a Mad With Power Fest II was in the works, featuring several notable bands including the Lords of the Trident, Zephaniah and Green Death. In March 2018 they finished recording their fourth album, Shadows from the Past, that was released on August 25, 2018. Notable collaborations on the album include Brittney Slayes from Unleash the Archers, a professional chorus, full orchestra, and a small fan group recorded in Ty's basement studio. Tours for the year included North Carolina, Canada, and the upper Midwest. The band continued to produce a large amount of non-musical content, largely for paying fans via their Patreon website. Over the course of 2018, the band produced seven music videos for songs off of Shadows from the Past, as well as a playable music video game for the Sega CD video game system.

=== Pull the Plug, Mad With Power Fest III, European Tour (2019) ===
On January 11, 2019, the band released their fifth album, Pull The Plug. This album is composed of acoustic songs released solely to their Patreon backers as a monthly subscriber benefit. Shortly thereafter, the band announced the lineup for the third year of their annual Mad With Power Fest, featuring Theocracy as the headliner. 2019's Mad With Power Fest was the band's first independently-run sold out festival, and dates for next year (as well as some of the bands already booked for 2020) were announced on-stage by singer Ty Christian.

Shortly after Mad With Power Fest, the band embarked on their first headlining tour of Europe, visiting Belgium, Germany, Austria, Italy, and the Czech Republic. The band announced via their Patreon page that work had begun on the next album, with a planned release date of late 2020.

=== Power Outage, COVID impact, Digital Concerts (2020) ===
After a promising start to 2020, the COVID-19 outbreak ground most activities to a halt for the band. Mad With Power IV was canceled and moved to 2021. While album writing work continued, the band pivoted quickly to digital livestreams including full concerts, solo guitar concerts ("Baron's Solo Shred Sessions"), solo vocal concerts ("Fang Sings the Classics" and "Drunken Quarantine Karaoke"), and a weekly livestream gaming session on Twitch ("Fang's Weird SegaCD Game Collection"). Via these efforts, the band was able to raise $4,000 for various charities over the course of the year.

Additionally, the band created two new YouTube series during the quarantine - "Power Metal Opera Battles" and "Power Converter" - and continued work on their other YouTube series, releasing one video per week for the remainder of 2020. On November 27, 2020, the band released their sixth album, Power Outage. This was the second album composed of acoustic songs released solely to their Patreon backers as a monthly subscriber benefit. The album was originally intended to be released earlier in the year, but production work was hindered by the COVID-19 outbreak.

The band announced that they had finished writing the next album in late December 2020, and that recording would start in early 2021.

=== The Offering, Return to Live Shows, Mad With Power IV (2021) ===
Via their Patreon website, the band announced that their new album would be called The Offering. Recording was finished in June 2021, and final tracks were passed off to Hansen Studios for mixing and mastering at the end of June.

The band returned to live shows with a set at the Midwest Gaming Classic in early July, with Mad With Power Fest returning in August, where the band opened for Immortal Guardian in the fourth installment of their fully sold-out, marquee music festival. Building on the success of their livestreamed shows throughout the COVID pandemic, the band livestreamed the entire two-day concert, fully mixed, with multiple cameras.

In September 2021 the band was scheduled to open for Unleash the Archers at the Chicago stop of their 2021 tour, but UtA was unable to start their tour due to quarantine restrictions, as they were delayed in Belgium. Tour mates Seven Kingdoms and Æther Realm were left missing four or five stops on the tour, a serious financial and exposure blow to all bands.

To help save the tour, the Lords of the Trident offered their basement streaming space, built up during COVID to provide fully mixed, HD performances, tied into Twitch and YouTube. On September 3, Æther_Realm, Lords of the Trident, and Seven Kingdoms streamed a free, full three band concert to more than 400 fans. The tips provided more than covered the lost revenue from the missing performances. In December 2021, Lords would once again join Æther_Realm and Seven Kingdoms on the rescheduled Unleash the Archers tour for a number of dates.

=== The Offering release, Mad With Power V, Japan tour (2022) ===
Lords of the Trident released The Offering exclusively to Patreon backers on January 26, 2022, during a livestream. It was an unannounced "drop" release, with the public release of the album being withheld until April 1, 2022. The band announced they had created eight music videos for the album, as well as a "full album video" which consisted of 12 lyric videos back-to-back with narration in between. Additionally, the band announced that they would be touring Japan in December 2022, with accompanying tour packages available for Patreon backers.

2022's installment of Mad With Power Fest featured Psychostick and Æther Realm as headliners, and once again sold out. Festival organizer and Lords' frontman Ty Christian announced that 2023's festival would move to The Sylvee, a brand new 2,500 capacity venue in Madison, WI and would feature acts such as Powerglove, Unleash the Archers, Spirit Adrift, Seven Spires, and more.

Between playing shows and producing video content for YouTube, Ty Christian teamed up with Glenn Fricker's Spectre Sound Studios to produce three instructional courses for bands: "DIY Merch", "DIY Tour", and "Own the Stage: A Masterclass in Vocal Performance and Technique". The final course of the three was co-taught with Dr. J. Adam Shelton, a lyric tenor based in Madison, WI.

In December 2022 the band embarked on their first headlining tour of Japan, bringing along twenty Patreon backers with them on the trip. The band performed eight shows in Tokyo, Ibaraki, Nagoya, and Kobe, with half of the shows selling out. Shortly after their return from Japan, the band released a cover and music video of Anthem's song "Destroy the Boredom".

=== West Coast Tour, Rhapsody/Wind Rose Tour, Mad With Power 6 (2023) ===
Not long after their successful first tour of Japan, the Lords embarked on another first - a West coast tour. This excursion covered a large area of the Southwest and nearly the entire West Coast, from Los Angeles to the Hyperspace Metal Festival in Vancouver, B.C., Canada. The Lords' set drew Hyperspace's largest crowd to date of around 700 people. Shortly afterwards, the band joined Rhapsody of Fire, Wind Rose, and Seven Kingdoms on a handful of their US tour dates.

With the band's festival selling out multiple years in a row, the decision was made to move Mad With Power Fest from the High Noon Saloon to The Sylvee, a venue roughly six times the capacity of previous years' fests. In the middle of July, the band had announced that ticket sales for Mad With Power 6 had surpassed all other North American power metal festivals, making Madison the new home of the largest power metal fest in North America. The festival reached capacity and officially sold out near the end of Saturday, August 19, marking the fourth sold out festival in a row.

Shortly thereafter, the band announced an upcoming 2024 Japan tour with Seven Spires.

=== V.G.E.P., Sonic Symphony, Mad With Power 7, Japan Tour with Seven Spires, Mad With Power 8 (2024–2025) ===
In March of 2024, Ty Christian was announced as the new singer of the Sonic Symphony, a symphonic concert performing the music of Sega's Sonic the Hedgehog. Ty performed his first show with the group in Montreal. Along with co-stars Adrienne Cowan and Shota Nakama, the group consistently sold out venues across North America and Europe.

On 14 June 2024, the band announced they would release a new EP, V.G.E.P., on 1 October. This album - inspired by their favorite video games - included a music video for each song on the EP. The music video for "To Kill a God" showcased the first time a human has ever drummed inside of a 100,000v electrical field created by Tesla coils.

The lineup of Mad With Power 7 - which was moved to June in 2024 - featured headliners Fellowship from the UK and Anthem from Japan. This year's fest marked Anthem's first US-based show in over 35 years. Despite the international lineup, 2024 marked the first time since 2019 that Mad With Power fest did not sell out.

In December of 2024 the band toured Japan with Seven Spires. The band crafted a "sight-see by day, follow-the-tour by night" package offered through travel company PacSet, and 40 of the band's Patreon backers joined the two-and-a-half week excursion.

Mad With Power Fest 8 happened in June of 2025, featuring the most international line-up to date. The fest was plagued by visa issues and lost a number of the bands on its original lineup, but featured Dream Evil from Sweden and Firewind from Greece as headliners.

== Band members ==
Current

- Fang VonWrathenstein – vocals (2008–present)
- Akira Metal – guitar (2008–present)
- Pontifex Mortis – bass (2010–present)
- Baron Taurean Helleshaar – guitar (2015–present)
- Master Hercule "Herc" Schlagzeuger – drums (2017–present)

Former

- Socrates of Shred – guitar (2005–2009)
- Danalog – drums (2008–2009)
- Captain Bluddbeard – bass (2008–2010)
- Korgoth – drums (2009–2011)
- Sledge Garrotte – drums (2011–2013)
- Killius Maximus – guitar (2009–2015)
- Dr. Dante Vitus – drums (2013–2017)

Timeline

== Discography ==
=== Studio albums ===
- Death or Sandwich (2009)
- Chains on Fire (2011)
- Frostburn (2015)
- Shadows from the Past (2018)
- Pull the Plug (2019)
- Power Outage (2020)
- The Offering (2022)

=== EPs ===
- Plan of Attack (2013)
- A Very Lords of the Trident Christmas (2013)
- re:Quests (2015)
- V.G.E.P. (2024)

== Endorsements ==
The band as a whole is currently endorsed by:

- SKB Cases
- Bos Meadery
- Scorpion Percussion
