= The Absence (Luna Mortis album) =

Studio album by Luna Mortis
- Released: February 10, 2009
- Recorded: February and September 2008 at Audio Hammer Studios
- Genre: Melodic death metal, power metal, progressive metal, thrash metal
- Label: Century Media
- Producer: Jason Suecof

Luna Mortis chronology
Way of the Blade (2006)	The Absence (2009)

Professional ratings
Review scores
Source	Rating
AllMusic	4.5/5 stars

The Absence is the second studio album by the American metal band Luna Mortis. The album was released in 2009 by Century Media and is the first studio album that Luna Mortis released through that record label. Four of the tracks on the album were recorded in February 2008 with producer Jason Suecof at his Audio Hammer Studios and were used as a demo that was sent out only to record labels in hopes of acquiring a recording contract for the band. It was those four songs that led to Century Media to sign Luna Mortis and shortly after, the band returned to Audio Hammer Studios in September of that same year to record the six other songs that make up the album. In September 2009, the band released a music video for the song "Forever More".

== Track listing ==
All songs written by Brian Koenig, except where noted.

1. "Ash" - 4:41
2. "Ruin" - 4:02
3. "Reformation" - 3:17
4. "This Departure" - 5:10
5. "The Absence" - 4:14
6. "Forever More" - 3:40
7. "Never Give In" (Koenig, Marry Zimmer) - 6:24
8. "Phantoms" - 3:56
9. "Last Defiance" - 4:27
10. "Embrace the End" (Koenig, Zimmer) - 6:22

Japanese bonus tracks:

11. "Affliction"
12. "Anemic World"

== Credits ==
- Mary Zimmer – vocals
- Brian Koenig – guitar
- Cory Scheider – guitar
- Jacob Bare – bass
- Erik Madsen – drums
