= Zak Santiago =

Canadian actor and DJ (born 1981)

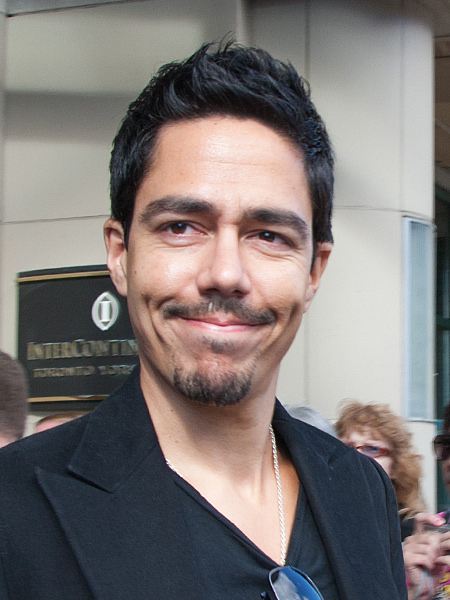
- Zak Santiago at TIFF 2010
- Born: January 3, 1981 (age 45); Vancouver, British Columbia, Canada
- Occupations: Actor, DJ, and permanent deacon
- Years active: 1997–present

Zak Santiago (born January 3, 1981) is a Canadian actor, dancer, DJ, and a permanent deacon in the Catholic Church. Known for his extensive work in television and film, he was ordained to the diaconate in 2024.

== Early life: A call to the arts ==
Zak Santiago, was born on January 3, 1981, in Vancouver, British Columbia, Canada, to immigrant parents. He is one of six siblings and is fluent in English, Spanish and French.

In his formative years, Zak studied at The Royal Conservatory of Music in Toronto. His studies ranged from classical piano, ballet, flamenco, and boxing. By 1994, he began pursuing interests in both the performing arts and as a disc jockey. He attended his first acting class at Gastown Actors Studio in Vancouver, British Columbia.

In 1998, Zak ended his amateur boxing career to focus exclusively on dance. In 2000, he was accepted into the world-renowned Amor de Dios (Love of God) Academy in Madrid, Spain, where he studied under several legends of flamenco.

== Adult life: A call to ministry ==
Santiago was raised as a Roman Catholic Christian and during his teenage years, lost interest in the Church. Due to several simultaneous tragic events in his life as a young adult, he returned to the Church. He has since been very devout and active within the Church.

In recent years, he has been heavily involved in prison ministry, in both prison chaplaincy and the Released Offenders Program. Per his Facebook page, Santiago graduated from the University of British Columbia, in July 2023 with a Master's Degree (MA) in Theological Studies and also received the Chancellor's Award. He has since received a post-graduate diploma in Pastoral Care. This education not only better prepared him for his prison ministry, but also for the next phase in his life. On June 1, 2024, he was ordained to the permanent diaconate of the Roman Catholic Church at Holy Rosary Cathedral in Vancouver. On Santiago's Facebook, Instagram and X pages, he posted the following along with a photo of himself in his clerics: "Visting Professional, Vancouver Coastal Health (VGH); Prison Ministry, BC Corrections Adult Custody Division; Parish Deacon, Holy Rosary Cathedral."

Santiago is deeply committed to prison ministry and is currently working towards a Master's Degree in Pastoral Studies.

== Career ==
Santiago has appeared in many television shows. He was in the episode "My Room" in season 1 of Dead Like Me, as an angry man who decided to kill the tattoo artist who had botched his tattoo. In 2004, he played Dominguez in the movie The Five People You Meet in Heaven, based on the 2003 book.

Roles in other series include Young Blades, Smallville, Robson Arms, Flight 93, Dirk Gently's Holistic Detective Agency, Shut Eye, and The L Word.

In 2008, he appeared in the theatrical release movie The Eye, starring Jessica Alba.

Continuing on in television, in 2009, Santiago had a lead role in The Assistants which aired on The N and also played the Ten of Clubs in the Syfy miniseries Alice.

As of 2014, he has a recurring role as Ramón Rodríguez, the dance instructor, restaurant owner, DJ, and wedding officiant in the Signed, Sealed, Delivered series.

Alongside his acting career, Santiago also works as a DJ.

== Filmography ==
=== Film ===
Year	Title	Role	Notes
1999	Late Night Sessions	Danny	
2000	Trixie	Gang Member	
2001	Turbulence 3: Heavy Metal	Gabriel Mendoza	
2001	Josie and the Pussycats	Megastore DJ	
2003	How It All Went Down	Tico's Partner	
2005	Underclassman	Anderson	
2005	Severed	Ramon	
2006	Canes	Antique Dealer	
2006	Deck the Halls	Fireworks Guy	
2007	Shooter	Senior Agent	
2007	Normal	Bob the Social Worker	
2008	The Eye	Emilio	
2008	Ace of Hearts	Officer Sanchez	
2008	Tortured	Dictaphone Holder	
2009	Driven to Kill	Detective Lavastic	
2010	The Tortured	Young Cop	
2010	Amazon Falls	Aron	
2011	The House	Geoff Blank	
2012	Maximum Conviction	MP Fields	
2012	Random Acts of Romance	Matt	
2013	Concrete Blondes	Lars	
2013	The Dick Knost Show	Rico	
2014	The Grim Sleeper	Officer Gates	
2014	Perfect Sisters	Detective Santiago Gates	
2014	Bad City	Emcee	
2014	What an Idiot	Steve	
2016	Mostly Ghostly: One Night in Doom House	Michael Roland	
2016	The Assignment	Lawyer	
2017	Cult of Chucky	Nurse Carlos	
2017	Meditation Park	Jonathan	
2018	Benchwarmers 2: Breaking Balls	Smegman	
2019	Promiseland	John / Voice of Cartel Leader	
2021	American Badger	John / Voice of Cartel Leader	
2021	The Four Fathers	Enrique Garza	

=== Television ===
Year	Title	Role	Notes
1997	Poltergeist: The Legacy	Pierce	Episode: "Shadow Fall"
1998	Viper	Jerry Podwil	Episode: "Internal Affair"
1998–1999	The Crow: Stairway to Heaven	Curtis Bilbao	5 episodes
1999	Night Man	Player #2	Episode: "Dust"
1999	Sweetwater	Jorge	Television film
1999	Nothing Too Good for a Cowboy	Logger	Episode: "Float Like a Butterfly"
2000	Higher Ground	Rocko	Episode: "Worlds Apart"
2000	Level 9	Morph	Episode: "Digital Babylon"
2001	Da Vinci's Inquest	Irish Billy Mulvaney	Episode: "Shoulda Been a Priest"
2002	Dark Angel	Kurt	Episode: "Love in Vein"
2002	Jeremiah	Sam	2 episodes
2002	The Twilight Zone	Cheto	Episode: "The Pool Guy"
2003	The Dead Zone	Raul	Episode: "The Man Who Never Was"
2003	Out of Order	Angry Juror	6 episodes
2003	Dead Like Me	Willy	Episode: "My Room"
2003	Stargate SG-1	Rogelio Duran	2 episodes
2004	The Goodbye Girl	Dance Class Instructor	Television film
2004	Traffic	Carole's Agent	3 episodes
2004	The L Word	Oscar	4 episodes
2004	Kingdom Hospital	Dr. Sonny Gupta	9 episodes
2004	The Five People You Meet in Heaven	Dominguez	Television film
2004	Human Cargo	Ramirez	3 episodes
2005	Ladies Night	Gates	Television film
2005	Confessions of a Sociopathic Social Climber	Geoffrey	Television film
2005	Murder at the Presidio	Private Sulway	Television film
2005	Fighting the Odds: The Marilyn Gambrell Story	Ed Rivera	Television film
2005	Young Blades	Ramon de la Cruz	13 episodes
2005–2006	Intelligence	Harvey Guilford	3 episodes
2005–2008	Robson Arms	Hal Garcia	23 episodes
2006	Flight 93	Ahmed al-Haznawi	Television film
2006	Disaster Zone: Volcano in New York	Jose	Television film
2006	The Evidence	Nicholas Lopez	Episode: "Five Little Indians"
2006	Godiva's	Emile	2 episodes
2006	A Girl Like Me: The Gwen Araujo Story	Carlos Guerrero	Television film
2006	Saved	Ignatio	Episode: "Secrets and Lies"
2006	Rapid Fire	Russell	Television film
2006	Smallville	Deputy Morales	Episode: "Subterranean"
2006	Home by Christmas	Mario	Television film
2007	A Family Lost	Marcus Vegarra	Television film
2007	Cleaverville	Gus	Television film
2007	The 4400	Colin McGrath	Episode: "The Truth and Nothing But the Truth"
2007	Flash Gordon: A Modern Space Opera	Zack	Episode: "Life Source"
2008	The Capture of the Green River Killer	Seth Imperia	2 episodes
2008	Little Girl Lost: The Delimar Vera Story	Brian Santos	Television film
2008	Eureka	Dr. Sebastian Marx	Episode: "Show Me the Mummy"
2009	The Assistants	Zach Del Toro	13 episodes
2009	Defying Gravity	Juan	3 episodes
2009	Alice	10 of Clubs	2 episodes
2009	The Farm	Alfredo Martinez	Television film
2009, 2010	Stargate Universe	Cpl. Rivers	2 episodes
2010	Human Target	Agent Fouts	Episode: "Lockdown"
2010	At Risk	Roy	Television film
2010	The Front	Roy	Television film
2010	Psych	Manny	Episode: "Shawn and Gus in Drag (Racing)"
2010	Caprica	Pann	3 episodes
2010	Smoke Screen	Detective Javier	Television film
2011	V	John Fierro	4 episodes
2011	The Troop	Lee Stanley	Episode: "Mirrors"
2011	Killer Mountain	Ram	Television film
2011	Sanctuary	Captured Abnormal	Episode: "Resistance"
2011–2013	The True Heroines	Hugo Rodriguez	5 episodes
2012	Rags	Diego	Television film
2012	Fairly Legal	Rick Nuñez	Episode: "Borderline"
2012	The Music Teacher	Gary	Television film
2012	True Justice	Edi Gogol	11 episodes
2012	Fringe	Cecil	Episode: "Through the Looking Glass and What Walter Found There"
2012	Battlestar Galactica: Blood & Chrome	Captain Diaz	Television film
2013	Health Nutz	Constable Kornstick	Episode: "Last Chance"
2013	Once Upon a Time	Prince Henry	Episode: "The Miller's Daughter"
2013	Chupacabra vs. the Alamo	Commander Wilcox	Television film
2013	Whisper of Fear	Romero	Television film
2013	King & Maxwell	Gustavo	Episode: "Wild Card"
2013	Cult	Det. Mario Zavala	5 episodes
2013	Baby Sellers	Rafael Ochoa	Television film
2013–2014	Continuum	Agent Miller	9 episodes
2013	Delete	Captain	2 episodes
2014	Motive	Virgil Maddox	Episode: "For You I Die"
2014	Signed, Sealed, Delivered	Ramón Rodríguez	2 episodes
2014	Hell on Wheels	Marcos Fuentes	Episode: "Life's a Mystery"
2014	Witches of East End	Mathias	3 episodes
2014	Til Death Do Us Part	Ethan	Television film
2015	Fatal Memories	Glenn Roberts	Television film
2015	Signed, Sealed, Delivered: From Paris with Love	Ramón Rodríguez	Television film
2015	Love, Again	Nico	Television film
2015	Ghost Unit	Mateo	Episode #1.1
2015	Signed, Sealed, Delivered: The Impossible Dream	Ramón Rodríguez	Television film
2016	The 100	Semet	2 episodes
2016	iZombie	Pablo Balaban	Episode: "Pour Some Sugar, Zombie"
2016	Signed, Sealed, Delivered: One in a Million	Ramón Rodríguez	Television film
2016	Shut Eye	White Tony	8 episodes
2016	Dirk Gently's Holistic Detective Agency	Cross	13 episodes
2017	The Arrangement	Dimitri Fonseca	Episode: "The New Narrative"
2017	Signed, Sealed, Delivered: Higher Ground	Ramon Rodriguez	Television film
2017	Signed, Sealed, Delivered: Home Again	Ramon Rodriguez	Television film
2017	Ghost Wars	Rodney Doyle	4 episodes
2017	The Christmas Princess	Ignacio Marquez	Television film
2018	Signed, Sealed, Delivered: The Road Less Travelled	Ramon Rodriguez	Television film
2018	The X-Files	Mr. Green	2 episodes
2018	Signed, Sealed, Delivered: To the Altar	Ramon Rodriguez	Television film
2018	Travelers	Daniel Sosa	Episode: "Yates"
2019	Blood & Treasure	Everado Sanchez	Episode: "Return of the Queen"
2019	Wu Assassins	Sgt. Joe Torres	Episode: "Ladies' Night"
2019	My Wife's Secret Life	Ari Sheffler / Detective	Television film
2020	The Christmas Yule Blog	Oscar Ortiz	Television film
2021	The Long Island Serial Killer: A Mother's Hunt for Justice	Arresting Officer	Television film
2021	Debris	Gary Garcia	Episode: "Do You Know Icarus?"
2021	Signed, Sealed, Delivered: The Vows We Have Made	Ramón Rodríguez	Television film
2024	Signed, Sealed, Delivered: A Tale Of Three Letters	Ramón Rodríguez	Television film
2025	Signed, Sealed, Delivered: To The Moon And Back	Ramón Rodríguez	Television film

== Awards and nominations ==
In 2004 Santiago won a Leo award for Best Supporting Performance by a Male in a Dramatic Series for his performance as Ramirez in Human Cargo. He was nominated for Leo awards in 2006 for Young Blades episode "Enchanted", in 2013 for Random Acts of Romance and 2018 for Christmas Princess.
