= Only the Strong (Thor album) =

Studio album by Thor
- Released: April 1985
- Recorded: Livingston Studios and Silo Studios, London
- Genre: Heavy metal, power metal, hard rock
- Length: 38:33
- Label: Rainbo/Viper
- Producer: Tom Doherty

Thor chronology
Unchained (1983)	Only the Strong (1985)	Live in Detroit (1985)

Professional ratings
Review scores
Source	Rating
AllMusic	3/5 stars
The Encyclopedia of Popular Music	3/5 stars
Rock Hard	7.5/10

Only the Strong is the second album by the Canadian/American heavy metal band Thor, released in 1985. The singles "Let the Blood Run Red", "Knock 'Em Down", and "Thunder on the Tundra" helped the album reach platinum status in Canada and the United Kingdom. "Let the Blood Run Red" and "Thunder on the Tundra" peaked, respectively, at Nos. 91 and 89 on the UK Singles Chart.

== Track listing ==
No.	Title	Length
1.	"2045"	0:52
2.	"Only the Strong"	3:06
3.	"Start Raising Hell"	3:50
4.	"Knock 'Em Down"	4:12
5.	"Let the Blood Run Red"	4:28
6.	"When Gods Collide"	4:38
7.	"Rock the City"	4:10
8.	"Now Comes the Storm"	2:57
9.	"Thunder on the Tundra"	3:28
10.	"Hot Flames"	3:10
11.	"Ride of the Chariots"	3:39

2000 limited reissue
No.	Title	Length
12.	"Rock the City"
13.	"Knock'em Down"

2002 bonus tracks
No.	Title	Length
12.	"Invader"	3:58
13.	"Unchained"	5:01

25th Anniversary Reissue
No.	Title	Length
12.	"Lady of the Night"	2:46
13.	"Warriors of the Universe" (Live from the Sweden Rock Festival 2009)	3:39

2021 Digipak Deluxe edition bonus tracks
No.	Title	Length
12.	"Wild Life"	2:36
13.	"Steal Your Thunder"	3:37
14.	"Energy"	3:46
15.	"We Live to Rock"	3:26
16.	"All Evil in My Path"	3:15
17.	"Forever and After"	3:24
18.	"Anger Is My Middle Name"	3:20
19.	"I Am TunderHawk"	4:13
20.	"Ride Away from You"	3:11
21.	"Lightning Strikes" (Live)	2:58
22.	"Thunder on the Tundra" (Live)	3:48

Bonus DVD "Only The Strongest World Tour"
No.	Title	Length
1.	"Lightning Strikes"
2.	"Ride of the Chariots"
3.	"Anger"
4.	"Show of Strength - Super Lung"
5.	"When Gods Collide"
6.	"Let the Blood Run Red"
7.	"Gladiators Battle (Smash the Bricks)"
8.	"Electric Eyes"
9.	"Show of Strength - Secret of the Steel"
10.	"Show of Strength - Super Lung"
11.	"Atomic Vibrations (Behind the Mask)"
12.	"Thunder on the Tundra"
13.	"When Gods Collide"
14.	"UK Tour & Tour Bus Antics"

== Notes ==
2000 reissue

- Tracks 12–13 recorded Live Pinktooth Brush, U.K. 06/13/1985

2021 Bonus Tracks

- Tracks 12–15: from "The Edge Of Hell" (1987)
- Tracks 16: 1983 demo of "Scratch and Destroy" recorded at A Step Above Studios, NY
- Tracks 17: Recorded in 1983 at A Step Above Studios, NY. Additional recording in 1988
- Tracks 18: 1981 demo of "Anger" recorded at Moshroom Studios, Vancouver, BC & Thunder Sound Studios, New Westminster, BC
- Tracks 19: 1986 demo of "Thunderhawk" recorded at Thunderhawk International Studios
- Tracks 20: Recorded in 1981 at Moshroom Studios, Vancouver, BC & Thunder Sound Studios, New Westminster, BC. Additional recording in 1988 at Thunder Sound Studios, New Westminster, BC

Bonus DVD

- Tracks 1–6: Marquee, London 1984
- Tracks 7: Great Yarmouth Festival 1984
- Tracks 8: Connecticut 1983
- Tracks 9: New York 1983
- Tracks 10: New York 1982
- Tracks 11: Washington DC 1982
- Tracks 12: Great Yarmouth Festival 1984
- Tracks 13: Vancouver, Canada 1984
- Tracks 14: United Kingdom Tour 1984

== Credits ==
- Jon Mikl Thor – vocals
- Steve Price – guitar
- Keith Zazzi – bass, backing vocals
- Mike Favata – drums
- Cherry Bomb (a.k.a. Rusty Hamilton) – backing vocals

== Production ==
- Produced by Tom Doherty
- Engineers: John Dent, Tony Harris
