= Empyria =

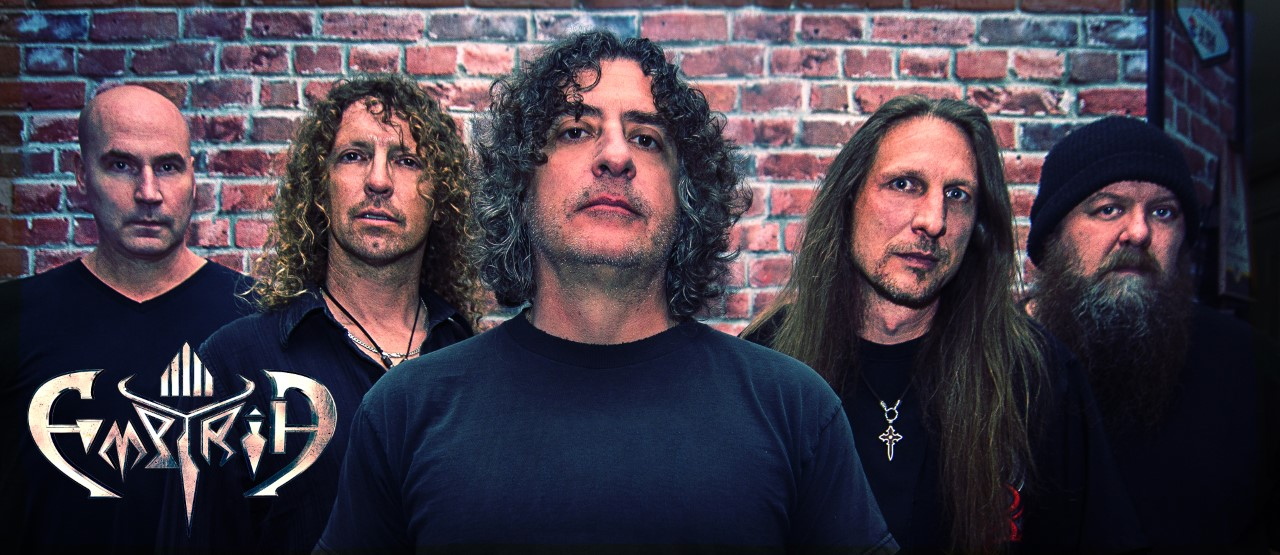
- Empyria 2021

Background information
- Origin: Vancouver, British Columbia, Canada
- Genres: Progressive metal, power metal
- Years active: 1991–2021
- Labels: Nightmare Records, Scrape Records, Noise Records
- Members: Mike Kischnick; Phil Leite; Scott Gamble; John Buck; Steve Bifford
- Past members: Paul Falcon; Simon Adam; Ken Firomski; Troy Taillon

Empyria was a Canadian progressive power metal band, formed in 1991 by Mike Kischnick, Paul Falcon, and Simon Adam in Vancouver, British Columbia, Canada. The band relocated to Kelowna, British Columbia, in 2003.

== History ==
The first album (8-song cassette), Ornamental Ironworks (Independent), was released in 1993, featuring a progressive rock influence. Behind Closed Doors, which featured a more progressive metal sound and was their first actual label release, was released in 1996 on T & T / Noise Records (Germany) record label.

In 1997, original singer/bassist Falcon left the band and was replaced by Phil Leite (vocals) and Ken Firomski (bass). The third album, Changing Currents, was released in 1998 independently and distributed by Nightmare Records (US) and Rising Sun (Germany).

A progressive metal compilation album, The Awakening, was released in 1998 by KMI Ent., which featured Empyria's title track "Changing Currents".

In 2000, The Legacy was released by Nightmare Records (US). It featured for the first time all four parts of Empyria's The Lighter Sides of Darkness as a continuous 25-minute epic, plus a cover of The Police's "Synchronicity II".

A compilation album, Westcoast Canadian Metal Feast, was released in 2001, just prior to Empyria's Sense Of Mind album and featured the title track. The next album, Sense Of Mind, from 2002, continued the vein of the previous album in general, adding more melody to the songs.

In 2003, Empyria took a long hiatus due to Kischnick's involvement in 12 albums and two tours with Canadian metal band Thor and various other projects.

In 2009, Empyria re-united and released The Long Road Home through Nightmare Records, with the return of Falcon (bass), Phil Leite (vocals), Kischnick (guitars/synth) and new drummer Scott Gamble. The album saw a return to their progressive rock and metal influences.

A new digital only single, "The Sheltering ( 2011 A.D.)", was released on July 1 (Canada Day) 2011, with former bassist Ken Firomski.

The band continued to play occasional shows with bands such as Sabaton, Firewind, Warrel Dane, and Nickelback.

Empyria released a new digital single, "Beyond The Doors", and B-side "Green Manalishi", on March 28, 2014. It was the first release featuring all current Empyria members.

They released Divided EP on July 16, 2019, on Scrape Records. The seven track EP contained two new tracks plus a couple of classic band songs, with all current Empyria members. Two bonus tracks were also included - "Beyond The Doors" and their cover of Fleetwood Mac's "The Green Manalishi".

Empyria appears on Scrape Records The Label Vol. II limited edition vinyl compilation album & CD, released on May 29, 2020.

Empyria announced on February 15, 2021, the band was officially over and released one last video for "Returning Home" containing unseen/archived photos and video from 1991 to 2021. All Empyria releases and merchandise will still be available through Scrape Records and their own website.

Mike and Phil's new project band EMBERS OF EIGHT released their debut digital only EP titled 2120 on September 3, 2021.

Former Empyria members under the name "NEW HORIZON IV" will release a full length album titled: 2012 - "The Lost Tapes" (digital only release).

Recorded in 2011/2012 but never completed until 2021. It was available December 1, 2021.

== Discography ==
=== Studio albums ===
- Ornamental Ironworks (1993 (8-song cassette))
- Behind Closed Doors (1996)
- Changing Currents (1998)
- The Legacy (EP) (2000)
- Sense Of Mind (2002, DVD format Limited Edition)
- The Long Road Home (2009)
- "The Sheltering (2011 A.D.)" (2011, Free Digital Single)
- "Beyond The Doors" (2014, Digital Release Only Single w/ B-side)
- Divided (Mini-album) (2019)

=== Compilation albums ===
- Powerquest (compilation) - The Awakening (1998)
- Westcoast Canadian Metal Feast (compilation) - Scrape Records (2001)
- BW&BK Knuckletracks XXVI (compilation) - BW&BK (2001)
- Nightmare Records Sampler (compilation) - Nightmare Records (2010)
- Armstrong Metalfest Sampler (compilation) - Armstrong Metalfest (2012)
- The Label Sampler Vol. II (compilation) - Scrape Records (2020)

== Band members ==
=== Current members ===
- Mike Kischnick: guitars/synth (1991–2021)
- Phil Leite: vocals (1997–2021)
- John Buck: bass (2011–2021)
- Scott Gamble: drums (2008–2021)
- Steve Bifford: guitars (2010–2021)

=== Former members ===
- Paul Falcon: bass (1991–97; 2008–2010)
- Simon Adam: drums (1991–2008)
- Ken Firomski: bass (1997–2008)
- Troy Taillon: drums (1993 & 1995)

=== Special guests ===
- Troy Taillon: drums ("Forever" 2002)
- Rob Matharu (Mongoose): guitar (solos on "Heaven's Cry" and "Sense Of Mind" (2002)
- Neville Bowman: keyboard (solo on "The Endless Circle" (2009)
- Pat Brown (Ten2Nine): vocals (bg's on "No Other Way" (2009)
- Sean Stubbs: (Numb, SNFU, Jakalope, and Bif Naked) drums ("2 Song Demo" 1994)
