= Thor (band) =

Heavy metal band from Vancouver, Canada

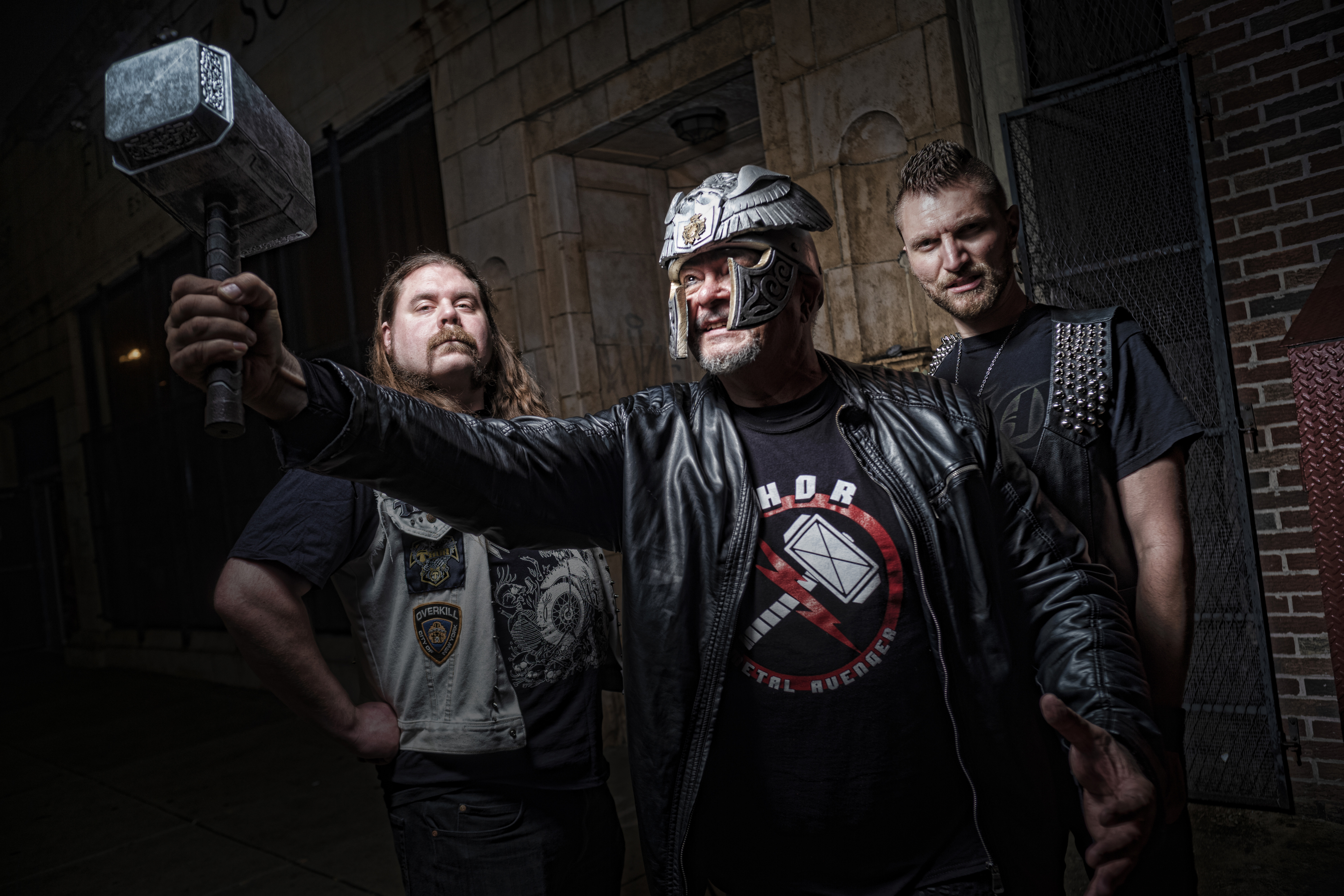
- From left to right: John Liebel (guitar), Jon Mikl Thor (vocals), and Ted Andre Jedlicki (bass), 2019

Background information
- Origin: Vancouver, British Columbia, Canada
- Genres: Hard rock, heavy metal, power pop (1977–78), glam metal, power metal
- Years active: 1973–1976, 1977–1978, 1983–1987, 1997–present
- Labels: Cleopatra, Deadline Music
- Members: Jon Mikl Thor; Ted Jedlicki; Tom Croxton; Matt Hamilton
- Past members: Frank Soda; Terry McKeown; John Shand; Billy Wade; Steve Price; Frank Boehm; John Tonin; Michael Root; Karl Cochran; Jimmy Whang; Mike Favata; Jimmy Ambrose; Pantera (Rusty Hamilton); Keith Zazzi; Ani Kyd; Cal "Fang" Thompson; Mike O Jason The Pounder; Marty Martian; Mike Kischnick; Joel "Savage" Watts; Sean "Killer" Kilby; John Leibel; Will Maravelas; Richard Fabio; Kevin Stuart Swain; Frank Meyer; Bruce Duff; Joseph Turner
- Website: Thorcentral.com

Thor (stylized as THOR) is a Canadian heavy metal band from Vancouver, British Columbia, Canada.

== Biography ==
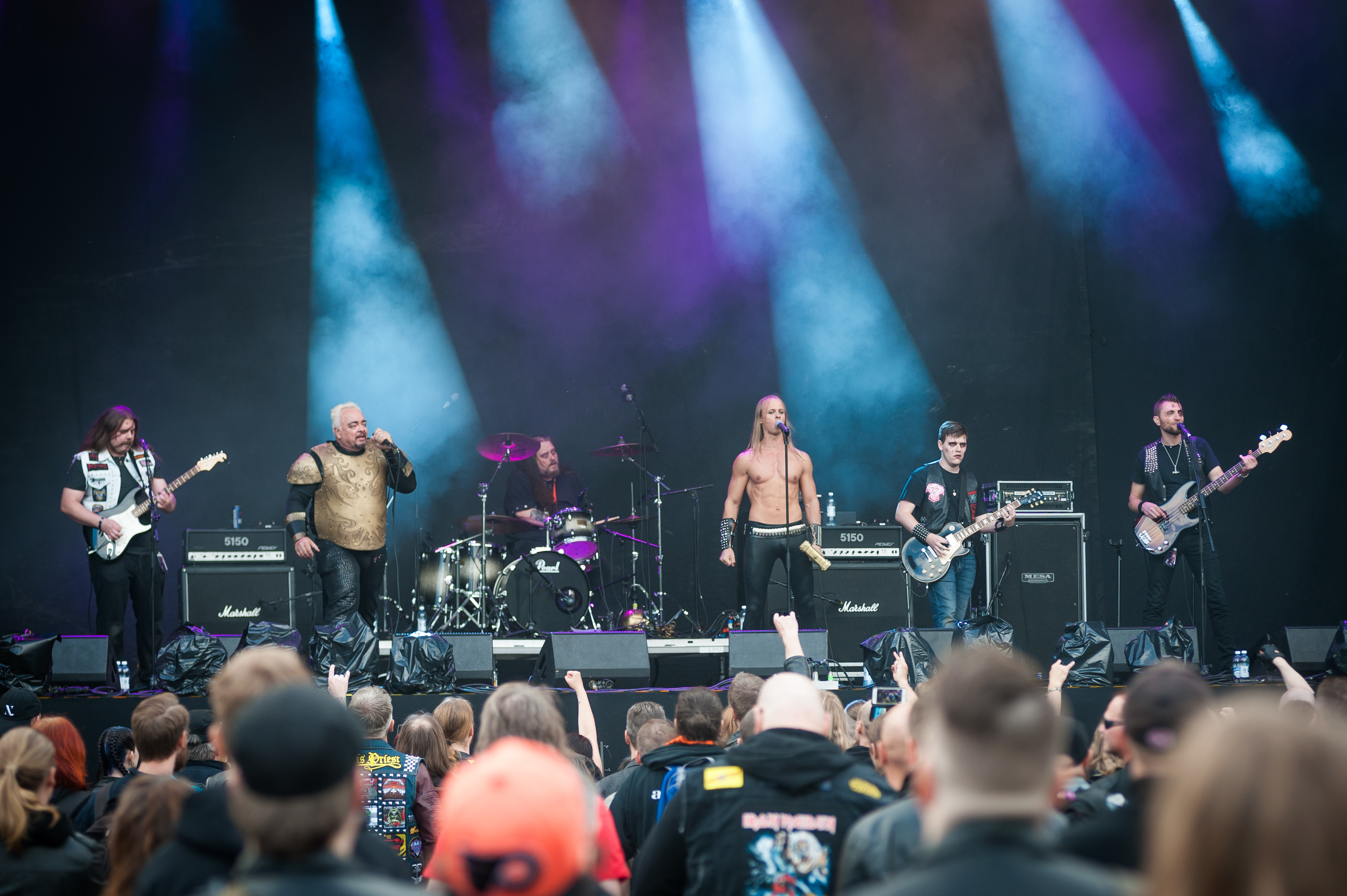
Thor performing at the 2018 South Park festival in Tampere, Finland

Thor started out as a concept band in 1973. They used the names "Thor", "Centaur", and "Mikl Body Rock", conceived by Jon Mikl Thor, a vocalist, musician and body building champion who won titles such as Mr. USA and Mr. World Canada, with the intention to combine muscle with music. In every show, Jon Mikl Thor would appear as "Thor The Rock Warrior". Thor as "Mikl Body Rock" toured throughout North America seeking to garner enough attention to secure a record deal.

In 1976, Jon Mikl met guitarist Frank Soda while touring Canada. Frank Soda joined "Thor" who also became known as "Thor and The Imps". The band toured constantly in the Eastern USA and Canada region building a large following. The first album was recorded in Toronto, Ontario, Canada, under the name Thor and was called Muscle Rock. Released by the independent label God Of Thunder Records, the record gained the attention of various managers and producers who wanted to sign the act. Jon Mikl Thor was offered a large deal to star in a production at the Aladdin Resort & Casino in Las Vegas called 'Red Hot and Blue'. Frank Soda wanted to keep touring with the band, so Frank Soda and The Imps were formed. Jon Mikl Thor went on to star in Las Vegas and was discovered by Merv Griffin, who had Thor perform live on the Merv Griffin Show from Caesars Palace on national television. Thor's performance was a hit, and offers came in from various major labels. Thor decided to sign with RCA Records in late 1976.

=== 1977–1987: Thor ===
This new incarnation of Thor was formed in 1977 by Jon Mikl Thor and released their debut album Keep the Dogs Away. After much touring, Jon Mikl Thor resided in New York City. He formed a new band with backing members Rusty Hamilton aka Queen Pantera, Mike Favata, Jimmy Ambrose, James Whang and Keith Zazzi in 1983 and released the Unchained EP. The record, which was on Mongol Horde Records in the USA got picked up for distribution in England through Albion Records. The band travelled to London, England, to perform at the Marquee Club and signed with Motörhead's manager Douglas Smith. In 1984, the band decided to live in the UK. Most of the time was spent at studios in London, writing and recording new material. The songs "Let the Blood Run Red" and "Thunder on the Tundra" became instant chart toppers with "Thunder on the Tundra" reaching number one on the British rock chart.

The success of the singles soon led to 1985's album Only the Strong. Thor's stage performances involved antics such as Jon Mikl Thor breathing into hot water bottles until they burst, breaking bricks over his chest and head and bending steel bars and microphone stands. In 1986, Thor released Recruits – Wild in the Streets on GWR Records. The band would break up in 1987 and Jon Mikl entered the world of acting, starring in such movies as Recruits (1986, as Thunderhead), Zombie Nightmare (1987, as Tony Washington), and Rock 'n' Roll Nightmare (1987, as John Triton).

=== 1997–2026: Later activity ===
Ten years later in 1997, the band released the compilation album Ride of the Chariots (An-Thor-Logy). Following this release the band returned with new material and in 1998 they released Thunderstruck (Tales from the Equinox), and have since released five additional albums. In 1999, a selection of songs from Keeping the Dogs Away were re-released on a split CD with Ontario metalcore band Coalition Against Shane through 13th Day Recordings.

From 2000–2011, Thor continued to record, release albums and tour, building a larger following and connecting with a new generation. Albums released have been Dogz II (2000), Triumphant (2002), Beastwomen from the Centre of the Earth (2003), Are U Ready (2004), Thor Against the World (2005), Devastation of Musculation (2006), Into the Noise (2007), Steam Clock (2008) Sign of the V (2009), The Guardian (2010), and Soundtrack from the movie THOR - The Rock Opera (2011). Thor wrote the music for and were starring in the movie Thor - The Rock Opera. In 2009 Thor performed at the Sweden Rock Festival, Sauna Open Air Metal Festival in Tampere, Finland and the Muskelrock Festival (named after Thor and The Imps first EP Muscle Rock) in Alvesta, Sweden.

On April 30, 2011, Thor headlined the Shock Stock Festival in London, Ontario, Canada. The band consisted of original guitar player Frank Soda as well as new additions Joel "Savage" Watts on drums and Sean "Killer" Kilby on bass. Then Thor embarked on a tour of Scandinavia from May 31 to June 7 playing at DOM (The Dome) in Helsinki, Finland on June 1, performing their live rock opera and showcasing film Thor - The Rock Opera; then revisiting the Muskelrock Festival in Alvesta, Sweden from June 2 to June 4.

In January, 2012, a special edition vinyl album called Thor's Teeth was released through the Baltimore-based label A389 Recordings. It was later launched digitally through Chicago based Smog Veil Records in April 2012. Thor signed a multi album deal with Rock Saviour/Pegasus Records in Germany and Frank Soda returned to the studio with Thor to write songs and lay down vocal tracks for albums Thor – Thunderstryke (2012) and Thor – Thunderstryke II (2013). On July 20, 2012, Thor headlined the Armstrong MetalFest at Hassen Arena.

In 2014, Thor re-released their 1985 album as Only the Strong - Deluxe Edition distributed by Deadline Records.

The documentary film I Am Thor, directed by Ryan Wise and produced by Ryan Wise and Al Higbee, had a world premiere in 2015 and toured film festivals throughout the world, winning audience and critical acclaim. The movie got picked up for distribution in the USA through Dark Sky Films / MPI Media Group. The film won Best Documentary at the Fantasia International Film Festival 2015 in Montreal. Thor embarked on a sold-out major city tour throughout the USA in November 2015, screening the movie, followed by a live Thor concert. Another tour launched in March 2016.

On May 13, 2016, the official reissue of Thor's 1977 Keep the Dogs Away album was released on Deadline Records. Thor: A Rock Odyssey, a live three-part rock concert spectacular, was presented on stage at the Highline Ballroom in New York City on May 14 in celebration of the 1977 Keep the Dogs Away album and to launch the release.

On August 4, 2017, the album Beyond the Pain Barrier was released. The album was co-written by Jon Mikl, John Leibel and Ted Jedlicki. Prior to the album's release the single and video for "The Calling" was released. Also in 2017, drummer Tom Croxton was added to the lineup. Croxton is a veteran of the music scene, notably for his long tenure in the shock rock band, Impaler. In September 2019, Matt Hamilton, a member of Croxton's other band, Hex Vortices, joined to help solidify the space left by McNallie's departure earlier that year.

On July 16, 2021, the album Alliance was released, Thor's 39th studio album. Alliance features 17 tracks, as well as guests, including W.A.S.P.'s Chris Holmes, Raven vocalist John Gallagher, Soilwork singer Björn Strid, Danko Jones, Anthrax's Neil Turbin, Ross "The Boss" Friedman, and numerous others.

In 2018, Thor teamed up with producer, songwriter, musician, and performer Kevin Stuart Swain to make the album Christmas in Valhalla, and later on Hammer of Justice (2019), Rising (2020), and their latest release Alliance (2021) for the Los Angeles based Cleopatra/Deadline Records.

In October 2021, Thor released a 2D animation video for the single "Queen of the Spiders", which is featured on Alliance.

=== 2026–present: Impending retirement ===
In October 2026, Jon Mikl Thor announced a final album (The Final Battle) and tour cycle for the group, and a new single titled "The Mighty Don't Fall" was released. The song features Rick Wakeman on keyboards, Bob Daisley on bass, Vinny Appice on drums, and Marcus Nand on guitar. Thor specified that he would retire due to his health. Dates in Europe and the United States were announced for 2027.

== Members ==
=== Current members ===
- Jon Mikl Thor – vocals (1973–1976, 1977–1978, 1983–1987, 1997–present)
- Ted Jedlicki – bass (2016–present)
- Tom Croxton – drums (2017–present)
- Matt Hamilton – guitar (2020–present)

=== Past members (incomplete) ===
- Frank Soda – guitar (1976, 2012, 2024)
- Charles Towers – bass (1976)
- James Lord – drums (1976)
- Terry McKeown – bass (1977–1978)
- John Shand – guitar, bass (1977–1978)
- Billy Wade – drums (1977–1978; died 2001)
- David Munkhoff – guitar (1977)
- Keith Zazzi – bass (1983–1986, 2007–2009)
- Mike Favata – drums (1983–1986, 2007–2014)
- Rusty Hamilton– backing vocals (1983–1986)
- Karl Cochrane – guitar (1983; died 2025)
- Steve Price – guitar (1983–1987, 2007–2009; died 2025)
- John Leibel – lead guitar (2016–2020)
- Will Maravelas – drums (2017, 2018–2019; session)
- Matt McNallie – guitar (2016–2020)

== Discography ==
=== Studio releases ===
- Muscle Rock (1977, EP; credited as Thor & the Imps)
- Keep the Dogs Away (1977)
- Unchained (1983; EP)
- Only the Strong (1985)
- Recruits – Wild in the Streets (1986; credited as Jon Mikl Thor)
- The Edge of Hell (1986; credited as "the Tritonz")
- Thunderstruck: Tales from the Equinox (1998)
- Dogz II (2000)
- Odin Speaks (2001, EP; split with Thor & the Ass Boys)
- Triumphant (2002)
- Mutant (2003)
- Beastwomen from the Center of the Earth (2004)
- Thor Against the World (2005)
- Devastation of Musculation (2006)
- Into the Noise (2008)
- Steam Clock (2009)
- Sign of the V (2009)
- The Guardian (2010)
- THOR - The Rock Opera (2011)
- Thor – Thunderstryke (2012)
- Thor – Thunderstryke II (2013)
- Aristocrat of Victory (2013)
- Metal Avenger (2015, compilation)
- Beyond the Pain Barrier (2017)
- Electric Eyes (2017, recorded 1979–1980)
- Christmas in Valhalla (2018)
- Hammer of Justice (2019)
- Rising (2020)
- Alliance (2021)
- Ride of the Iron Horse (2024)
- Rock the Universe (2025, cover album)
- The Final Battle (2027)

=== Live ===
- Live in Detroit (1985)
- Thor's Teeth (2012, live; recorded 2010)

== Music videos ==
List of music videos
Title	Year
"Keep the Dogs Away"	1977
"Sleeping Giants"	1977
"Catch A Tiger"	1977
"Lightning Strikes"	1983
"Anger"	1983
"Knock 'Em Down"	1985
"Live It Up"	1986
"Energy"	1987
"Dogz II"	2000
"Devastation of Musculation"	2006
"The Vancouver Millionaires"	2009
"Thunderstryker"	2012
"Metal Avenger"	2015
"The Calling"	2017
"Begging Of The End"	2019
"Wrap 5000"	2020
"The Game Is On"	2020
"Rising"	2020
"The Rut"	2020
"We Will Fight Forever"	2021
"Because we Are Strong"	2021
"We Need Musclerock"	2022
"Good Stuff"	2022
"5-0 Let's Go"	2024
"Bring It On"	2024
"No Time For Games"	2024
"Highway Star"	2025
"Mama Let Him Play"	2025
"Heart Full Of Soul"	2025

== See also ==
- List of glam metal bands and artists
