= Random Acts of Romance =

- Directed by: Katrin Bowen
- Written by: Katrin Bowen; Jillian Mannion; Kevin McComiskie
- Produced by: Katrin Bowen
- Starring: Robert Moloney; Laura Bertram; Amanda Tapping; Zak Santiago
- Cinematography: Brendan Uegama
- Edited by: Franco Pante
- Music by: Step Carruthers
- Production companies: Bowen Arrow Productions; Purple Productions
- Distributed by: Super Channel
- Release dates: 5 October 2012 (Vancouver International Film Festival); 8 November 2013 (Canada)
- Running time: 86 minutes
- Country: Canada
- Language: English

Random Acts of Romance (originally titled Love Bites) is a 2012 American comedy film directed by Katrin Bowen, starring Robert Moloney, Laura Bertram, Amanda Tapping and Zak Santiago.

== Cast ==
- Robert Moloney as David
- Laura Bertram as Holly
- Amanda Tapping as Diane
- Zak Santiago as Matt
- Ted Whittall as Richard
- Katharine Isabelle as Bud
- Sonja Bennett as Lynne
- Lisa Chandler as Sarah
- Taylor St. Pierre as Young husband
- Emily Bett Rickards as Young wife
- Nicholas Carella as Saul
- Morgan Brayton as Gwen
- Christina Jastrzembska as Mrs. Anderson
- Diana Pavlovská as Cooking lady

== Release ==
The film premiered at the Vancouver International Film Festival on 5 October 2012. It opened in theatres in Canada on 8 November 2013.

== Reception ==
Katherine Monk of Canada.com rated the film 3 stars out of 5 and wrote that there is "enough selection at the emotional buffet to keep our psychological palate amused." The Globe and Mail wrote that while the film "manages to transcend the hokey, overused bunch-of-connected-people-and-hey-some-of-them-are-at-the-same-restaurant-on-the-same-night construct with some really nice writing, and strong performances", the relationship between Matt and Diane "doesn't ring true".

Glen Schaefer of The Province wrote that while the film "deserves credit for its ambition and some snappy dialogue", its characters' behaviors "are all quirk and no reality." Chris Knight of the National Post wrote that the film "never quite gathers the momentum promised in the opening scenes."

Radheyan Simonpillai of Now wrote that "If there are any sincere ideas about modern love buried within Katrin Bowen’s Random Acts Of Romance, they’re barely visible beneath all the frivolity, contrivance and foolishness."
