= Angelical Tears =

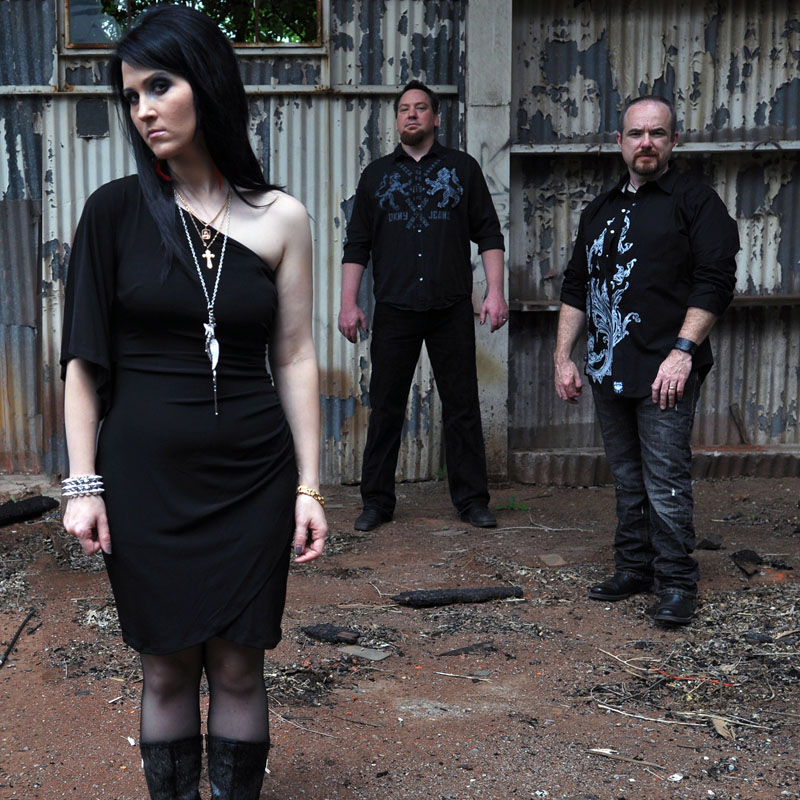
- Angelical Tears 2012 - From Left To Right: Julia, Glenn, Steven

Background information
- Origin: Oklahoma City, Oklahoma, United States
- Genres: Gothic metal, symphonic metal
- Years active: 2007 – present
- Labels: http://www.bluefreya.com/, http://www.liquid-tree.com/
- Members: Julia Flansburg; Steven Bittle; Glenn Flansburg
- Past members: Jose Gabaldon; Tal Raz; Sean Doyle; Mark Johnson; Jordan Barbor; Chad Slane; Derek Teague; Brandon Fields; John Kenerson; Tanner Hodjkinson; Jennifer Corbin; David Baker; Robby Ray; Jeremy "JC" Clifton
- Website: AngelicalTears.com

Angelical Tears is an American symphonic gothic metal band with rock and alternative influences, formed in 2007 in Oklahoma City, Oklahoma. Their musical style has been compared to that of Evanescence.

== Biography ==
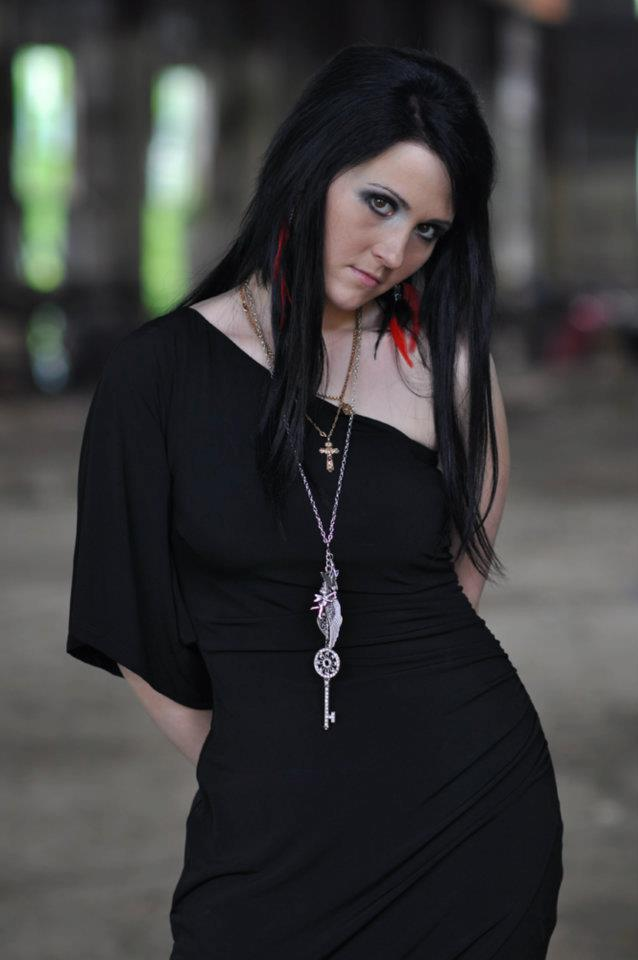
Julia in 2012

=== Formation ===
In the summer of 2007 vocalist Julia Flansburg and bass guitarist Glenn Flansburg dreamed of having their own band. Their dream was fulfilled in October of that year when they found a drummer, Bandon Fields and lead guitarist, Jose Gabaldon. In April 2008 the band had their first performance for 97.1 FM The Buzz's Annual March Bandness of Rock, with a new guitarist, Tal Raz, who had replaced Jose. The band made it to the final four of the competition. Encouraged, the band continued to perform in the Oklahoma City area. By June 2008, Sean Doyle joined in on guitar and David Baker on keyboards. In September, Tal left the band and was replaced by Mark Johnson. In December, the band took time off, upon learning Julia was pregnant. The band reformed with a new drummer, Tanner Hodgkinson in early 2009. The following couple of years proved difficult and the line up on guitars changed frequently. In January 2009 Mark left the band to join Horse Called War. He was replaced by Jordan Barbour. Several shows were played during the early months of 2009. Sean left the band in August 2009 and he was replaced by current guitarist Steven Bittle. Also, Tanner left the band the same month and was replaced by John Kenerson.

=== EP: 2010 ===
Recording of an EP began in December 2009. But while preparing for the recording in November, Jordan had to leave the band for personal reasons. He was replaced by a classmate of Glenn's, Derek Teague. Shortly afterward, David had to leave the band for work related reasons. He was soon replaced by Jennifer Corbin, who finished up the recording. Throughout the busy year of 2010, more than 30 shows were performed. In August 2010, the band released their first studio recording, a six-song EP. Shortly aftwards, John left the band and Tanner was brought back to play the drums. A distribution deal was made with BlueFreya to bring the new album to music stores in Australia in November 2010. The album was well received and claimed many well favored reviews.

=== The Eleventh Hour: 2011 onward ===
In February 2011, Jennifer left the band and David was brought back again to play the keyboards until a permanent replacement could be found. May 2011 was a busy month for the band. Robby Ray was brought in as the full-time replacement for keyboards. Tanner left the band and was replaced by Jeremy "JC" Clifton, formerly of "Horse Called War", as the new drummer. Derek announced his departure from the band to continue his college education in Nashville.

Angelical Tears played at Dame-Nation in Chicago, Illinois, on July 29, 2011.

Their second album, The Eleventh Hour, was self-released on June 23, 2012. It contains 13 tracks including two bonus tracks.

In May 2013, JC left the band. The band has a tentative agreement to work with former Where Angels Fall drummer Ole Kristian Løvberg for their next album due to release in 2014.

== Band members ==
=== Current ===
- Julia Flansburg – vocals
- Steven Bittle – guitars/vocals
- Glenn Flansburg – bass
- Ole Kristian Løvberg - drums/programming

=== Former ===
- Jose Gabaldon – guitars (2007–2008)
- Tal Raz - guitars (2008)
- Sean Doyle – guitars (2008–2009)
- Mark Johnson – guitars (2008–2009)
- Jordon Barbour - guitars (2009)
- Chad Slane – guitars (2009)
- Derek Teague – guitars (2009–2011)
- Brandon Fields – drums (2007–2009)
- John Kenerson – drums (2009–2010)
- Tanner Hodgkinson – drums (2008–2009, 2010–2011)
- Jennifer Corbin – keyboards (2010–2011)
- David Baker – keyboards (2008–2010)
- Robby Ray - keyboards (2011)
- Jeremy "JC" Clifton - drums (2011–2013)

== Discography ==
=== Studio albums ===
- The Eleventh Hour (2012)
  - Another Day (Sample)
  - Hate (Sample)
- EP (2010)

=== Singles ===
- "Once Upon a Time" (2018)
