= Flight of the Valkyries =

Annual metal festival in the United States

- Genre: Metal
- Locations: St. Paul, Minnesota, Minnesota, United States and Baltimore, Maryland, Maryland, United States
- Years active: 2007–2018

Flight of the Valkyries was an annual metal festival with editions held Saint Paul, Minnesota, and beginning in 2010, Baltimore, Maryland, in the United States. The festival was dedicated to metal bands with female lead vocalists.

In 2007 SwordLord Productions announced the first Flight of the Valkyries festival, dedicated to metal bands with female lead vocalists. Shortly after seeing the Minnesota promoter's festival announcement, Maryland-based promoter Bobbie Dickerson of BlackRoseMetalHeart Promotions contacted promoter Nathan Block of SwordLord Productions. The two immediately began working together to create and promote the US-based festival that showcased the talent and the diversity of women in the metal genre.

In 2010, the Flight of the Valkyries festival began to grow under the guidance and promotion of BlackRoseMetalHeart Promotions to include an east coast show, aptly titled FotV East. FotV East debuted in Baltimore at The Ottobar on November 6, 2010. The FotV East Mini-Fest showcased regional female-fronted metal acts, attempting to gather more east coast support for future FotV festivals in Baltimore. Due to the positive response to the first FotV East festival in 2010, another festival was planned for Baltimore in 2011 featuring more well-known national acts.

== History ==
The festival debuted at Station 4 in St. Paul, Minnesota in June 2007 featuring bands Doro, Vainglory, Earthen, The Ottoman Empire (now known as Luna Mortis), Visideon, Spiritual Decay, and Sirens of Titan. In June 2008, the Flight of the Valkyries continued with its second installment featuring Unexpect, Shadowside, Benedictum, Dendura, Visideon, Earthen, Something to Fear, and Aria Sharp. In June 2009, Flight of the Valkyries held its third annual festival featuring Benedictum, Luna Mortis, Todesbonden (featuring Laurie Ann Haus), Hydrogyn, A.D.D., Sirens of Titan, Kaptivating Kate, Rott, and guest vocalist Nina Osegueda. Flight of the Valkyries moved to Baltimore in November 2010, now titled Flight of the Valkyries East.

== Past line-ups ==
=== 2007 - St. Paul ===
DORO (Germany)
Vainglory (Georgia, USA)
Earthen (Chicago, Illinois, USA)
Visideon (Minneapolis, Minnesota, USA)
The Ottoman Empire (Madison, Wisconsin, USA)
Spiritual Decay (Fort Wayne, Indiana, USA)
Sirens of Titan (Minneapolis, Minnesota, USA)

=== 2008 - St. Paul ===
Unexpect (Canada)
Shadowside (Brazil)
Benedictum (San Diego, CA)
Visideon (Minneapolis, MN)
Dendura (Detroit/Grand Rapids, MI)
Earthen (Brookfield, IL)
Something to Fear (Minneapolis, MN)
Aria Sharp (Minneapolis, MN)

=== 2009 - St. Paul ===
Benedictum (San Diego, CA/Arizona)
Luna Mortis (Madison, Wisconsin, USA)
Todesbonden (Maryland/DC/Virginia)
Hydrogyn (Kentucky)
A.D.D. (Illinois)
Sirens of Titan (Minneapolis, Minnesota, USA)
Kaptivating Kate (Wisconsin)
Rott (Idaho)

=== 2010 - FotV East - Baltimore ===
Black Widow USA (Baltimore, Maryland)
Operatika (New Jersey)
River Runs Scarlet (Pittsburgh, Pennsylvania)
A Sound of Thunder (Washington, DC)
[geist] (Baltimore, Maryland)
Suhgarim (Columbia, South Carolina)
Dying Design (Baltimore, Maryland)
Cassandra Syndrome (Frederick, Maryland)

=== 2011 - FotV East - Baltimore ===
Benedictum
Echoterra
DesDemon
Brave
Flames of Fury
Serpent Witch

=== 2012 - FotV 6 - Baltimore ===
A Sound of Thunder
MindMaze
Echoes Never Lie
Sekengard
Spellborne

=== 2015 - FotV 7 - Baltimore ===
A Sound of Thunder
MindMaze
Echoes Never Lie
Sweet Suicide
Spellborne

=== 2016 - FotV 8 - Baltimore ===
Sorrowseed
Dogs & Day Drinkers
Shokker
Novarium
Master Sword
