= Murder at the Presidio =

- Genre: Mystery
- Written by: Allison Graham
- Directed by: John Fasano
- Starring: Lou Diamond Phillips; Victoria Pratt; Martin Cummins
- Theme music composer: Roger Bellon
- Country of origin: United States

Production
- Producers: Scott W. Anderson; Stanley M. Brooks; Chad Oakes; Ian R. Smith; Evan Tylor
- Cinematography: Paul Mitchnick
- Editor: Roger Mattiussi
- Running time: 89 min.
- Production companies: Evolution Films; Nomadic Pictures

Original release
- Release: May 2, 2005

Murder at the Presidio is a 2005 American made-for-TV murder mystery film directed by John Fasano and starring Lou Diamond Phillips, Victoria Pratt and Martin Cummins. Phillips plays a military detective investigating a robbery-homicide in the Presidio military base in San Francisco. Principal photography for the film was done in Victoria, British Columbia, Canada.

The film was released on DVD on August 9, 2005. Scott Weinberg of DVD Talk gave the film 2.5 out of 5 stars and judged its replay value worth 1 out of 5 stars. He said the film was too predictable, likening it to an episode of Murder, She Wrote.

== Cast ==
- Lou Diamond Phillips as Chief Warrant Officer James Chandler
- Victoria Pratt as Corporal Tara Jeffries
- Martin Cummins as Sergeant Barry Atkins
- Eugene Clark as Captain Donovan
- Kim Hawthorne as Barbara Owens
- Leslie Easterbrook as Thelma 'Bunny' Atkins
- Daniel Roebuck as Major Dawson
- Jason Priestley as Tom
- Luciana Carro as Corporal Diana Phillips
- Vincent Gale as Private Brooks
- Ona Grauer as Kathy Tucker
- G. Michael Gray as David Raymer
- Julie Johnson as Corporal Valerie Irving
- Blu Mankuma as Assistant District Attorney
- Jon Mikl Thor as Thor
- Zak Santiago as Private Sulway
- Peter Sherayko as Detective Robert Sayer
- Stefanie von Pfetten as Fran Atkins
- Dean Wray as Steve Wilson
- David Cubitt as Private Arch Dwyer (uncredited)
- Todd Whalen as Corporal Grubbs (uncredited)

== See also ==
- The Presidio
