= Jon Mikl Thor =

Canadian bodybuilder, musician and actor (born 1953)

- Thor in 2004

Background information
- Born: Jon David Mikl; 1953 (age 72–73); Vancouver, British Columbia, Canada
- Occupations: Bodybuilder; actor; musician
- Member of: Thor

Jon Mikl Thor (born 1953), better known as simply Thor, is a Canadian bodybuilding champion, actor, songwriter, screenwriter, historian, vocalist, and musician.

As a bodybuilder, he was the first Canadian to win both the Mr. Canada and Mr. USA titles. During his bodybuilding career, he has achieved over 40 titles around the world. As a musician, he is the front man for the heavy metal band Thor, billing himself as "The Legendary Rock Warrior". He has also had a career in acting, appearing in such films as Recruits (1986), Zombie Nightmare (1987), Rock 'n' Roll Nightmare (1987), and FUBAR (2002).

== Music career ==
Thor started the concept Thor in 1973. He combined strength feats, props, costumes and showmanship with music: his feats included bending solid steel bars in his teeth and having solid concrete blocks smashed off his chest with a sledgehammer. Jon Thor created the "THOR T in Shield Logo" in 1973 which would become the copyright and trademark for the band. Thor toured Canada and the US throughout the 1970s and 1980s. In 1976, Thor performed on American national television with his appearance on The Merv Griffin Show.

Shortly after, Jon recorded the album Keep the Dogs Away in 1976–77 through his own company God Of Thunder Productions. The album was licensed to RCA and released in early 1978. Jon appeared on the cover artwork as "Thor The Rock Warrior", holding back four dobermanns. In February 1984, Thor performed at the Marquee in London, England, to an audience which included Jimmy Page of Led Zeppelin. The review in Kerrang magazine proclaimed "He Came, He Thor, He Conquered". He then licensed recordings to Albion Records. Albion released songs such as "Thunder On the Tundra" and "Let the Blood Run Red" which went to number one on the UK Rock Chart. Thor toured throughout the UK performing at such concerts as the Great Yarmouth Festival and released albums such as Only the Strong (1986) and Recruits – Wild in the Streets (1986).

In 1987, Jon Thor retired from live performances and started to write and produce films as well as forming his own record label. By 1997, he had returned to the recording studio and started to make live appearances with the release of Ride of the Chariots. More albums followed from 1998 to 2009. In 2004, Jon Thor was voted one of the top 100 greatest frontmen of all time in Classic Rock Magazine by an international panel of journalists as. In 2005, Thor signed with Smog Veil Records and released Thor Against the World followed by Devastation of Musculation in 2006.

In 2009, Thor signed on to the label Vulcan Sky Records, and released the albums Steam Clock (2009) and Sign of the V and re-released the 1983 EP Unchained. The same year he played with his former bandmates Steve Price, Mike Favata, and Ben Perman at the Sweden Rock Festival and Muskelrock Festival in Sweden and the Sauna Open Air Metal Festival in Tampere, Finland.

In 2011, Thor embarked on a tour of Scandinavia from May 31 to June 7, with Frank Soda on guitar, Savage Watts on drums and Killer Kilby on bass. He played at DOM in Helsinki, Finland on June 1, performing his live rock opera and showcasing his latest film Thor – The Rock Opera; then, he revisited the Muskelrock Festival in Alvesta, Sweden from June 2 to June 4.

After months in the studio recording the 2012 album Thunderstryke for Rock Saviour Records in Germany, Thor returned to live performing by headlining the Armstrong Metal Fest 2012 at Hassen Arena. Thunderstryke (2012) and Thunderstryke II (2013) were released to rave reviews and commercial success worldwide.

In 2013, Thor signed with Cleopatra Records in Los Angeles, California, and released a CD/DVD deluxe edition of his fifth album, Only the Strong (1985), in May 2014. This package includes additional unreleased bonus tracks and lost live footage.

In 2014, Cleopatra Records re-released the 1983 EP Unchained which included the version of the 1982 EP Lightning Strikes Again.

In 2015, Thor released Metal Avenger through Cleopatra Records.

Thor toured major cities during November 2015 in United States to promote the album Metal Avenger and the documentary film I Am Thor. A short North American tour followed in March 2016, along with the Canadian release on Raven Banner.

The official reissue of Thor's 1977 Keep the Dogs Away album, will be released on May 13, 2016, as a Super Deluxe double CD + DVD set by Deadline Records. This will coincide with a vinyl and digital launch of the recording.

On May 14, 2016, in New York City at the Highline Ballroom, Thor, produced by Fabio Productions, presented much like a Broadway show in three parts. 'Thor- a Rock Odyssey' featured Thor performing his 1977 Keep the Dogs Away album live in its entirety, followed by a 'Battle for New York' where Thor battles superhuman strongman 'Titano – The 8th Wonder of The World'. In part three, dubbed the 'Power Set', Thor sang his greatest hits along with some newly penned tunes written especially for the show.

On August 4, 2017, Thor released the album titled Beyond the Pain Barrier, which was co written with John Leibel and Ted Jedlicki.

In 2018, Thor teamed up with producer, songwriter, musician, and performer Kevin Stuart Swain to make the album Christmas in Valhalla, and later on Hammer of Justice (2019), Rising (2020), and their latest release Alliance (2021) for the Los Angeles-based Cleopatra/Deadline Records.

In October 2021, Thor released their newest project — the 2D animation video for the single "Queen of the Spiders." The song was written and produced by Jon Mikl Thor himself alongside long-time collaborator Kevin Stuart Swain.

== Other ventures ==
A native of Vancouver, Jon Thor, an avid historian and sports enthusiast, resurrected the Vancouver Millionaires hockey team, Vancouver's only Stanley Cup champions who won the cup in 1915. He actively pursued a retail and internet merchandising program incorporating his trademarks of the Vancouver Millionaires name and 'V' logo which he owned since 1977. He created a marketing concept using concerts, music and sporting events which made the Vancouver Millionaires synonymous with his Thor image. After years of historical study and promotion, Thor turned ownership of the Vancouver Millionaires, their website and the 'Victory V' logo over to the Vancouver Canucks and the NHL.

He is also the founder of VM Sports, a line of authentic Vancouver Millionaires apparel such as reproductions of the team's jerseys. Thor's Millionaires memorabilia commemorates the city's historic 1915 Stanley Cup-winning team. Several different Thor Rock God comic books were produced in the 1980s, most drawn by future Rock 'N' Roll Comics illustrator Ken Landgraf.

=== Acting ===
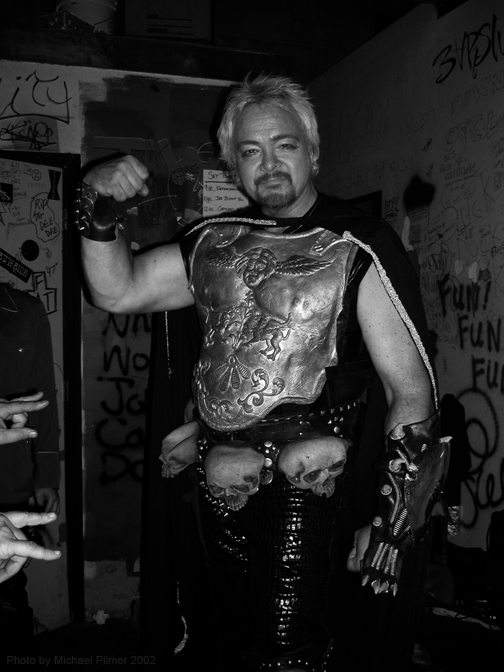
Thor backstage at Kings in Raleigh, North Carolina, 2002

Thor's music career coincided with his film career. In 2002, he wrote the title song for the movie FUBAR titled "FUBAR Is a Super Rocker". In 2005, he wrote "Glimmer" for the American made-for-television murder mystery film Murder at the Presidio and appeared in it. In 2007, he starred in the Lifetime network television film A Family Lost.

In 1987, Thor wrote, produced, and starred in the direct-to-video horror film Rock 'n' Roll Nightmare.

In 2011, Thor starred in the film Thor – The Rock Opera, which he co-produced with writer and director John Cody Fasano. The film premiered May 30, 2011, at the Shock Stock Film Festival in London, Ontario. Vulcan Sky Releasing released it on DVD on June 15, 2011.

Thor is featured in the documentary film titled I Am Thor. Directed by Ryan Wise, produced by Ryan Wise and Al Higbee, I Am Thor premiered at the Slamdance Film Festival in January 2015 in Park City, Utah, where it received positive reviews. It went on the 2015 international festival circuit and won awards such as the Best Documentary Award at the Fantasia International Film Festival 2015 in Montreal, Quebec. MPI/Dark Sky Films acquired worldwide distribution rights to I Am Thor and screened in select theaters and VOD in November 2015. To coincide with this release, Thor went on a US tour of major cities, screening the new film followed by a live concert.

In July 2021, Thor filmed scenes for a starring role in the upcoming Killer Wolf film Pact of Vengeance.

== Discography ==
=== Thor and the Imps ===
- Muscle Rock (1976)

=== Thor ===
- Thor-Body Rock (1973)
- Keep the Dogs Away (1977, 30th anniversary re-release 2009)
- Gladiator (1979)
- Striking Viking (1980)
- Unchained (1983, EP, re-released in 2009 & 2014)
- Only the Strong (1985, re-released as Deluxe CD/DVD Edition in 2015)
- Live in Detroit (1985, re-release 2009)
- Recruits – Wild in the Streets (1986)
- The Edge of Hell (1986) (credited as Tritonz)
- Ride of the Chariots (1997)
- Thunderstruck: Tales from the Equinox (1998)
- Dogz II (2000)
- Triumphant (2002)
- Mutant (2003)
- Beastwomen from the Center of the Earth (2004)
- Thor Against the World (2005)
- Devastation of Musculation (2006)
- Into the Noise (2008)
- Steam Clock (2009)
- Sign of the V (2009)
- The Guardian (2010)
- Thor – The Rock Opera Soundtrack (2011)
- Thor – Thunderstryke (2012)
- Thor – Thunderstryke II (2013)
- Aristocrat of Victory (2013)
- Only the Strong (2014, reissue)
- Unchained (2015, EP, reissue)
- Electric Eyes (2017, recorded in 1979)
- Metal Avenger (2015)
- Beyond the Pain Barrier (2017)
- Christmas in Valhalla (2018)
- Hammer of Justice (2019)
- Rising (2020)
- Alliance (2021)
- Queen of the Spiders (2021)
- Ride of the Iron Horse (2024)
- Rock the Universe (2025)

=== Tritonz ===
- The Edge of Hell (1987)
- Rock 'n' Roll Nightmare (2006)

=== Thor & the Ass Boys ===
- Odin Speaks (2001)

== Filmography ==
- Recruits (1986, as Thunderhead)
- Rock 'n' Roll Nightmare (1987, as John Triton)
- Zombie Nightmare (1987, as Tony Washington)
- Graveyard (2003, short film, as Ray)
- Murder at the Presidio (2005, as Thor)
- Intercessor: Another Rock 'N' Roll Nightmare (2005, as The Intercessor)
- A Family Lost (2007, as Gary)
- Thor – The Rock Opera (2011)
- I Am Thor (2015, as himself)
- Pact of Vengeance (2022, as John Pearce)
