= A Family Lost =

2007 TV film directed by John Fasano

- Genre: Drama; Suspense & Mystery
- Written by: Boon Collins; Gilbert Shilton
- Directed by: John Fasano
- Starring: Cynthia Gibb; Nicole Muñoz; Zak Santiago
- Music by: Michael Alemania
- Original language: English

Production
- Executive producers: Stanley M. Brooks; John Fasano; Jörg Westerkamp
- Producers: Damian Ganczewski; Michael Hagemeyer; Juliette Hagopian
- Cinematography: Paul Suderman
- Editor: Philip Norden
- Running time: 88 minutes
- Production company: Once Upon a Time Films
- Budget: $3,000,000

Original release
- Network: Lifetime
- Release: March 11, 2007

A Family Lost is a 2007 television film starring Cynthia Gibb, Nicole Muñoz, and Zak Santiago. It is about criminals who try to track a mother and diabetic daughter who survived a plane crash and carry stolen information. The film was released on March 11, 2007, and aired on the Lifetime Network. It was written by Boon Collins and Gilbert Shilton, and directed by John Fasano.
