= Luna Mortis =

American heavy metal band

- Also known as: The Ottoman Empire (2001–2008)
- Origin: Monroe, Wisconsin, U.S.
- Genres: Melodic death metal Power metal Progressive metal Thrash metal
- Years active: 2001–2010, 2013–2015
- Label: Century Media
- Past members: Mary Zimmer; Brian Koenig; Cory Scheider; Jacob Bare; Erik Madsen
- Website: www.facebook.com/lunamortismusic

Luna Mortis was an American heavy metal band based in Madison, Wisconsin. The band was formed in late 2001 in Monroe, Wisconsin as The Ottoman Empire. In 2006, the band self-released their debut studio album, Way of the Blade. In June 2007, Luna Mortis played the first Flight of the Valkyries female-fronted metal festival in St. Paul, MN under their original name.

In 2008, the band self-released an EP, The Answer: Does Not Exist. That same year, the band changed their name to Luna Mortis and signed a recording contract with Century Media. On February 10, 2009, the band released their debut for Century Media, The Absence, recorded in 2008 at Audio Hammer Studios and produced by Jason Suecof.

In June 2009, the band returned to St. Paul for the festival's third edition. Century Media Records dropped Luna Mortis in December 2009.

On February 15, 2010, Brian Koenig announced on Luna Mortis' MySpace page that the band had been dissolved and the members would be going their separate ways. On February 11, 2013, the band announced through their Facebook profile that they would reunite in 2013, planning festival appearances and new material. However, after only two shows, the members once again parted ways.

In 2015, vocalist Mary Zimmer joined the band White Empress, a new project created by former Cradle of Filth guitarist Paul Allender. Around the same time, guitarist Brian Koenig joined the band Lords of the Trident. Mary later became the singer for a band called Santa Marta.

== Musical style ==
Luna Mortis' musical style has been variously described as melodic death metal, power metal, progressive metal, and thrash metal. The band's vocal style is characterized by Mary Zimmer's use of clean vocals and growled vocals. Brian Koenig, the band's principal songwriter, stated some of his influences were Dream Theater, Joe Satriani, Megadeth, Metallica, Yngwie Malmsteen, and classical music. Mary Zimmer stated some of her influences were At the Gates and Carcass.

== Members ==
=== Final lineup ===
- Mary Zimmer – Vocals
- Brian Koenig – Guitar
- Cory Scheider – Guitar
- Jacob Bare – Bass
- Erik Madsen – Drums

=== Previous members ===
- Todd Olson - Guitar, Vocals
- Brad Lupo - Guitar
- Paul Kline - Guitar
- Nick Conti - Bass
- Zack Zweifel - Drums
- Dusty Weis - Drums

=== Session members ===
- Frank Grullon - Guitar (Sessions only)
- Brian Loomis – drum kit on Way of the Blade

=== Live members ===
- Chad Novell - Bass
- Adam Maltby - Drums

== Discography ==
- Twice Demo (2002)
- Curse of the Sun EP (2004)
- Way of the Blade (2006)
- The Answer: Does Not Exist EP (2008)
- The Absence (2009)

Works prior to The Absence were released under the band's former name, The Ottoman Empire.
