= Way of the Blade =

Studio album by The Ottoman Empire
- Released: October 17, 2006
- Genre: Progressive metal, power metal, thrash metal
- Length: 59:18
- Language: English

The Ottoman Empire chronology
Curse of the Sun EP (2004)	Way of the Blade (2006)	The Answer: Does Not Exist EP (2008)

Way of the Blade is the first full length released by the band The Ottoman Empire (later known as Luna Mortis). It was released on October 17, 2006.

== Track listing ==
1. "Anemic World" - 6:34
2. "Demon Twin" - 4:31
3. "Ottoman Empire" - 5:53
4. "Wrathshot" - 3:06
5. "One if by Sea" - 7:52
6. "Strike" - 5:40
7. "The Mercenary" - 12:20
8. "Vendetta" - 6:28
9. "Interlude" - 1:34
10. "Way of the Blade" - 5:54
