= Intercessor: Another Rock 'N' Roll Nightmare =

- Directed by: Benn McGuire; Jacob Windatt
- Written by: Chris Allen; Jacob Windatt
- Produced by: Jon Mikl Thor
- Starring: Jon Mikl Thor; Craig Bowlsby; Serge Saika-Voivod
- Edited by: Benn McGuire; Jacob Windatt
- Music by: Damien Storm; Mike Trainor
- Distributed by: Sub Rosa Studios
- Release date: 2005
- Running time: 90 minutes
- Country: Canada
- Language: English

Intercessor: Another Rock 'N' Roll Nightmare is a horror film produced in 2005 and is the sequel to Rock 'n' Roll Nightmare. It was written by Chris Allen and directed by Benn McGuire and Jacob Windatt. The film stars Jon Mikl Thor as a character called the "Intercessor" who travels to the present time to do battle with the demon Mephisto and the monster Zompira. The film is a low budget affair but appealed to Jon Mikl Thor's fan base.

== Synopsis ==
After ridding the Earth of the forces of darkness inhabiting an isolated Canadian farmhouse, The Intercessor must now do battle with new and just as deadly forces of evil.

== Cast ==
- Chris Allen as Famine
- Craig Bowlsby as Mephisto
- Daye Ellingham as War
- Melissa Ellingham as Laura
- Amy Lee as Julie's Sister
- Sharon McDonald as Julie
- Brad Pope as Harry
- Rob Scattergood as Pestilence
- Jon Mikl Thor as The Intercessor

== Reception ==
Dread Central was critical of Intercessor, stating that "No matter how intentionally campy Intercessor: Another Rock ‘N’ Roll Nightmare may have intended to be, the truth is that the film is so damn bad that even the intentionally campy stuff comes across as being unintentionally awful." Something Awful and DVD Talk also panned the film, with the latter stating that fans of Jon Mikl Thor would "want it for the music and the extra features but I can't see anyone else wanting to subject themselves to this one".
