= Recruits (film) =

- Directed by: Rafal Zielinski
- Screenplay by: Charlie Wiener; B. K. Roderick
- Story by: Maurice Smith
- Produced by: Maurice Smith; Mike Dolgy; Terrea Smith; Roger Corman (uncredited)
- Cinematography: Peter Czerski
- Edited by: Stephan Fanfara
- Music by: Stephen W. Parsons
- Production company: Maurice Smith Productions
- Distributed by: Cinépix Film Properties (Canada, 1986); Concorde Pictures (U.S., 1986)
- Release date: 1986
- Running time: 90 minutes
- Country: Canada
- Language: English

Recruits is a 1986 Canadian comedy film directed by Rafal Zielinski who had previously made Screwballs. It was an attempt to cash in on the success of Police Academy. The film features one of Lolita Davidovich's early film roles (being credited as "Lolita David"), as well as the film debut of Canadian bodybuilder and heavy metal musician Jon Mikl Thor.

== Plot ==
A police chief hires some misfits as police in order to embarrass the mayor.

== Cast ==
- Doug Annear
- John Canada Terrell
- Stephen Osmond
- Alan Deveau
- Mike MacDonald
- Tony Travis
- Annie McAuley
- Lolita Davidovich (as Lolita David)
- Colleen Passard
- Tracey Tanner
- Jon Mikl Thor
- Herb Field
- Jason Loga
- Carolyn Tweedle

== Production ==
The film features one of the early film appearances of Lolita Davidovich, being credited as "Lolita David", with one source claiming it was her film debut (though she had already appeared in the 1983 film Class), in the role of a recruit who ends up naked in a limousine that belongs to the governor. It is also the film debut of Canadian bodybuilder and heavy metal musician Jon Mikl Thor, in the role of a recruit named Thunderhead, who gets into a fight scene with a group of outlaw bikers while one his songs plays in the background.

The film was shot in Toronto, Canada starting 19 August 1985. It was the third production from the team of Zielinski, Maurice Smith and Michael Dology, following Screwballs and Loose Screws for Roger Corman's Concorde Pictures. The budget was less than C$1 million.

== Release ==
Recruits was released to theaters in 1986.

== Reception ==
Critics noted the film's similarities with Police Academy, with The Wallflower Critical Guide to Contemporary North American Directors mentioning it in its entry about director Rafal Zielinski, describing it as "a kind of Police Academy 4: Citizens on Patrol-lite, if that is at all possible," and Through the Shattered Lens writing, "Just as Police Academy was pretty much a rip-off of Stripes, Recruits is a rip-off of Police Academy.

Eleanor Riegel of The Atlanta Journal gave it a negative review, calling it "the front runner as the worst movie of the year," and "as raw as a movie can be". Orlando Aloma reviewed the film for The Sacramento Union, calling it "nothing more than a crude collection of what tries to pass nowadays as juvenile humor". Through the Shattered Lens was more positive, saying that "As far as brainless rip-offs of movies that weren't particularly good to begin with go, Recruits isn't that bad. The humor is even more juvenile here than it was in Police Academy and trying to apply too much logic to the plot will make your brain hurt, but it's a breezy 90 minutes and it's got a game cast [...]" The site calls Jon Mikl Thor's fight scene "a pretty cool scene" and ultimately concludes that "If you're nostalgic for these types of unapologetically dumb comedies, Recruits will satisfy that nostalgia."
