= Zombie Nightmare =

1987 horror film directed by Jack Bravman

- Promotional release poster
- Directed by: Jack Bravman
- Screenplay by: John Fasano
- Produced by: Jack Bravman
- Starring: Adam West; Jon Mikl Thor; Tia Carrere; Frank Dietz; Linda Singer
- Cinematography: Roger Racine
- Edited by: David Wellington
- Music by: Jon Mikl Thor
- Production company: Gold Gems
- Distributed by: Shapiro Entertainment
- Release date: October 1987
- Running time: 89 minutes
- Country: Canada
- Language: English
- Budget: $180,000

Zombie Nightmare is a 1987 Canadian zombie film produced and directed by Jack Bravman, written by John Fasano, and starring Adam West, Jon Mikl Thor, Tia Carrere, Frank Dietz, and Linda Singer. The film centres on a baseball player who is killed by a group of teenagers and resurrected as a zombie by a voodoo priestess. The zombie goes on to kill the teenagers, whose deaths are investigated by the police. The film was shot in the suburbs of Montreal. It was originally written to star mostly black actors, but at the request of investors, the characters' names were changed to more typically white names. While Bravman was credited as director, Fasano directed the majority of the film; problems occurred between Fasano and the production crew, who believed him to be the assistant director and ignored his instructions.

Originally intended for theatrical release, Zombie Nightmare was released direct-to-video by New World Video. It grossed C$1.5 million against a budget of $180,000. Although it received negative reviews from critics, who found the plot predictable and derivative, the film was praised for its heavy metal soundtrack featuring Motörhead, Girlschool, and Jon Mikl Thor's band Thor. Zombie Nightmare was featured in a 1994 episode of the comedy television series Mystery Science Theater 3000.

== Plot ==
Baseball player William Washington is fatally stabbed defending a young black girl from two white teenage boys. Years later, William's son Tony also becomes a baseball player. After Tony disrupts a robbery at a grocery store, he is struck and killed by a car full of teenagers: Bob, Amy, Jim, Peter, and Susie. The teens flee the scene and Tony's body is carried to his home, where his mother Louise mourns over him. She contacts Molly Mekembe, the girl William saved, to repay the favour of her rescue. Now revealed to be a Haitian voodoo priestess, Molly resurrects Tony as a zombie and uses her powers to guide him to the teenagers, aiding him in his revenge.

The next night, Tony tracks Peter and Susie to an academy gymnasium and fatally breaks Peter's neck, then kills Susie by crushing her skull with a baseball bat. Police detective Frank Sorrell investigates the case. Police Captain Tom Churchman tells the press that the killings were a drug-induced murder-suicide. The next night, Tony finds Jim sexually assaulting a waitress and impales Jim with his bat, killing him.

Churchman tells Sorrell that they found a suspect responsible for the murders and closes the case. Believing that the case has not truly been solved, Sorrell investigates photos that place Molly at both incidents. He suggests bringing her in for questioning but Churchman dismisses it. After sending Sorrell home to rest, Churchman calls Jim's father Fred and informs him of Molly's involvement in Jim's death. Fred goes to the police station to meet Churchman, but is killed by Tony en route.

Believing that they will be targeted next, Bob and Amy decide to leave town. They steal money from Jim's uncle's garage but Tony finds them there and kills them. Sorrell is attacked by Tony but survives. While monitoring Tony's actions, Churchman abducts Molly and forces her at gunpoint to show him where Tony is going. Sorrell follows Tony to a cemetery. Molly and Churchman soon arrive, with both telling Sorrell that the priestess resurrected Tony to not only avenge himself, but also to avenge Molly, as Churchman and Fred were the teenagers who attacked her years ago and Churchman killed Tony's father.

Churchman shoots Tony, having learned that a revived zombie's power fades once it has achieved its goal. Molly tries to cast a spell, but is shot and killed by Churchman, who then turns to kill Sorrell as the only surviving witness. However, a second zombie, presumably Tony's father, rises out of a nearby grave and drags Churchman into the ground while Churchman pleads for Sorrell to kill him but he ignores him and walks away.

== Cast ==
- Adam West as Capt. Tom Churchman
- Jon Mikl Thor as Tony Washington
- Tia Carrere as Amy
- Manuska Rigaud as Molly Mekembe
- Frank Dietz as Frank Sorrell
- Shawn Levy as Jim Batten
- Linda Singer as Maggie
- Alan Fisler as Bob
- Hamish McEwan as Peter
- Manon E. Turbide as Susie
- Walter Massey as Mr. Peters

== Production ==
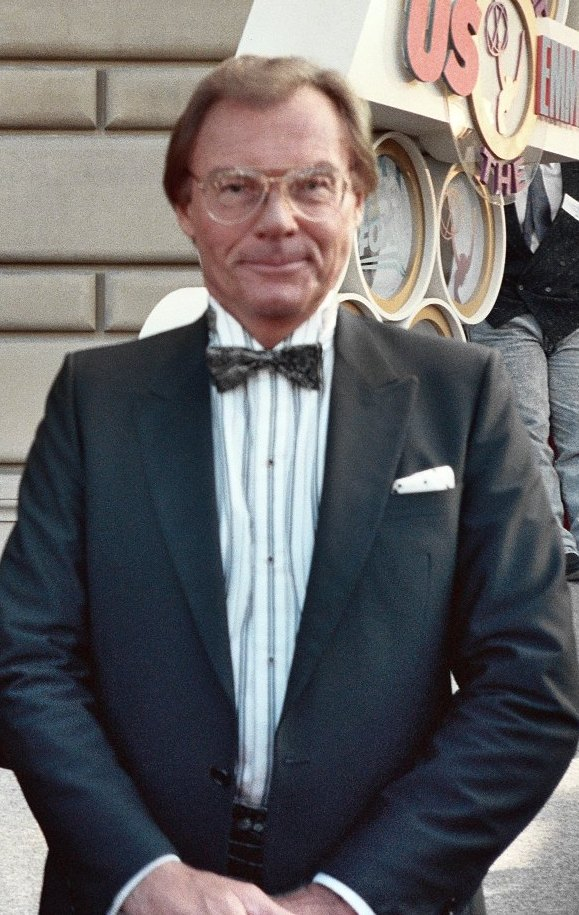
Adam West (pictured in 1989) was on the Zombie Nightmare set for two days.

Director Jack Bravman wanted to transition from adult films to horror, and contacted John Fasano after hearing about his work on Blood Sisters. Bravman asked Fasano to write the script and take an uncredited co-directing role. Fasano accepted and wrote the original script to have the teens be black with black-sounding names, setting the film in his hometown of Port Washington, New York, and offering local actors roles for the film. Associate Professor of the University of Lethbridge Sean Brayton described the original concept as "a retribution narrative" of a black character getting revenge on the white perpetrators of his death. The script was later changed to give the teens more white-sounding names because investors were worried that a black-centric cast would not sell in the foreign market. Having written the script on an IBM Selectric II, Fasano typed the white-sounding names onto a page, cut them out with a knife, and glued them to their appropriate places in the script. After the name changes, they received a budget of $180,000 from investors. Unions in New York did not give the production a permit to film in the state, so filming was moved to Montreal, Quebec.

Zombie Nightmare was produced by Montreal-based company Gold-Gems Productions and was the film debut of American actress Tia Carrere. Adam West played the crooked policeman Tom Churchman. West was on the set for two days and glanced at his script during his scenes; fellow cop Frank Sorrell was played by Frank Dietz, a childhood friend of Fasano. Manuska Rigaud, who played voodoo priestess Molly Mokembe, was a professional Tina Turner impersonator. The role of Tony was originally given to bodybuilder Peewee Piemonte. Days into production, Piemonte was fired for eating all the craft services and the meals of crew members. Piemonte was replaced by Jon Mikl Thor, singer for the Canadian rock band Thor. Wrestler Superstar Billy Graham was originally cast to play Tony's father. On the day he arrived in Montreal, no one came to pick him up at the airport and Graham left after waiting ten hours. Fasano took up the role. Scenes with West and Carrere were directed by Bravman while Fasano shot the majority of the film. Problems occurred between Fasano and the Canadian crew, who believed him to be assistant director and not co-director. This resulted in his directions being ignored by the crew, including cinematographer Roger Racine.

Tony Bua and Andy Clement, college friends of Fasano, made the zombie masks and provided the makeup for the film. It took five hours to apply Jon Mikal Thor's makeup, using glue and latex. American cast and crew members were housed in an airport hotel with pornography being played on every television channel, and they noticed that Bravman's name appeared in the credits for many of the films. Zombie Nightmare's editor, David Wellington, received the writing credit for the film so that it would qualify for a Canadian tax credit program.

Thor wrote much of the incidental music. This includes heavy metal riffs by his band and synthesizer music played by the band Thorkestra. Several other heavy metal bands contribute to the soundtrack. The Motörhead single "Ace of Spades" plays during the opening credits. Other bands heard on the soundtrack include Virgin Steele, Girlschool, Fist, and Death Mask, and a track by Thor's then-wife and backup singer Rusty Hamilton.

== Reception and legacy ==
=== Release ===
The film was originally planned for a theatrical release by Filmworld Distributors but it was instead released direct-to-video by New World Pictures. It was released in the United States on VHS in October 1987. The film grossed C$1.5 million worldwide. The film was released on special edition DVD by Scorpion Releasing in 2010.

=== Critical reception ===
Steve Bissette for Deep Red Magazine criticized the story for being predictable and derivative. Bissette thought the makeup and production values to be competent and noted Rigaud's "absurd over-the-top performance". Fangoria had praise for the performances of the teen leads and recommended the movie for its heavy metal soundtrack. However, the reviewer considered the film boring, criticizing the lack of special effects and the predictable plot. Ian Jane of DVD Talk wrote that the film was horrible but so "deliciously goofy" one couldn't help but have fun with it. Writing in The Zombie Movie Encyclopedia, academic Peter Dendle called it "painful and toilsome". Bloody Disgusting listed the film among the "cheesiest" of heavy metal horror films. Kerrang! considered the soundtrack to be better than the film itself. Jim Craddock, author of VideoHound's Golden Movie Retriever, summarized the film as "cheap and stupid".

=== Mystery Science Theater 3000 ===
Zombie Nightmare was featured in a season six episode of Mystery Science Theater 3000 (MST3K), a cult science fiction comedy television series in which the character Mike Nelson and his two robot friends Crow T. Robot and Tom Servo are forced to watch bad films as part of an ongoing scientific experiment. The episode was first showcased during Comedy Central's "Fresh Cheese" fall 1994 tour around college campuses in the United States. It made its television debut on Comedy Central on 24 November 1994. The episode premiered during the channel's annual Turkey Day marathon of MST3K episodes, which Adam West hosted. In The Amazing Colossal Episode Guide, a series guide written by MST3K members, Mary Jo Pehl described the movie as "painful" and said that the members of the show "thoroughly, intensely, and unequivocally hated this movie". In 2009, Shout! Factory released the episode as part of the "Volume XV" box set, and in 2017, the episode was added to Netflix.
