= Rock 'n' Roll Nightmare =

1987 film by John Fasano

- Special Edition DVD cover
- Directed by: John Fasano
- Screenplay by: Jon Mikl Thor
- Produced by: Jon Mikl Thor
- Starring: Jon Mikl Thor; Jillian Peri; Teresa Simpson; Frank Dietz; Lara Daans; Deedee O'Malley (DiCandia)
- Cinematography: Mark Mackay
- Edited by: Robert Williams
- Music by: Jon Mikl Thor
- Distributed by: Shapiro Entertainment
- Release date: 1987
- Running time: 83 minutes
- Country: Canada
- Budget: $52,000

Rock 'n' Roll Nightmare (also known as The Edge of Hell) is a 1987 Canadian direct-to-video horror film directed by John Fasano, and stars heavy metal musician Jon Mikl Thor, Jillian Peri and Teresa Simpson.

== Plot ==
Hoping to record some new music, the band Triton travels to an isolated farmhouse in Ontario, Canada, unaware that it is inhabited by murderous demons. Along for the trip are some of the band members' significant others, John's girlfriend Randy, Roger's new wife Mary, and Stig's girlfriend Lou Anne. Although some are disappointed at the lack of a television and other distractions, the band quickly begins to record new songs. The demons are also busy, as they begin secretly murdering and possessing the group's souls one by one, until only John is left.

Frustrated with the lack of success with claiming John's soul, Beelzebub appears in front of John, who reveals himself to be none other than the archangel known as the Intercessor. He also reveals that none of the other people at the house existed, as they were only shadows meant to trick Beelzebub into appearing. The two begin a fight to the death, which the Intercessor wins. As the movie comes to a close, it shows a suburban home in a seemingly normal neighborhood as foreboding music begins to play, implying that home is also demon ridden.

== Cast ==
- Jon Mikl Thor as John Triton
- Jillian Peri as Lou Anne
- Frank Dietz as Roger Eburt
- David Lane as Max
- Teresa Simpson as Randy
- Adam Fried as Phil
- Denise Dicandia as Dee Dee
- Jim Cirile as Stig
- Liane Abel Dietz as Mary Eburt

== Production ==
Rock 'n' Roll Nightmare was developed under the working titles of The Edge of Hell and The Arch Angel. It was shot in Toronto.

== Release ==
The film was distributed in the United States by the Shapiro Entertainment Corporation. The film was released on DVD by Synapse films.

=== Soundtrack ===
The film's soundtrack was released to CD in 2006. Thom Jurek of AllMusic gave it a favorable review, writing that "if you are looking for one of the most outrageously bad exploitation/horror movie soundtracks, get your hands on this one pronto."

| Title | Writer(s) | Producer(s) |
|---|---|---|
| "We Live to Rock" | Jon Mikl Thor; Steve Price | Peppi Marchello |
| "Energy" | Peppi Marchello | Peppi Marchello |
| "Edge of Hell (Wildlife)" | Steven Scott | Jon Mikl Thor; Robert Connolly |
| "Danger" | Steve Scott | Jon Mikl Thor; Robert Connolly |
| "Live It Up" | Rok Manonoff | Jon Mikl Thor; Robert Connolly |
| "Steal Your Thunder" | Steve Scott; David Aplin | Jon Mikl Thor; Robert Connolly |
| "The Challenge" | Steve Scott | Jon Mikl Thor; Robert Connolly |
| "Heads Will Turn" | Elliot Solomon | Jon Mikl Thor; Robert Connolly |
| "Touch Me Feel Me" | Frank Boehm; Steve Scott; John Tonin | Jon Mikl Thor; Robert Connolly |
| "Maybe It's Love" | Thomas DiCandia | Shapiro Publishing |

== Reception ==
In the years following its release the movie has received positive reviews over its campy nature, which multiple reviewers feel gives unintentional entertainment. Not Coming to a Theater Near You commented that the movie was "a cheap, incompetently rendered film, but it is not a deceptive one". Antagony & Ecstasy shared similar opinions, writing: "The movie has absolutely everything you could possibly want from high-spirited trash: a menagerie of uniformly dodgy foam monsters, an especially dodgy foam Beelzebub in the climax, clumsy dialogue, bizarrely flat performances, an ending that straight-up makes no sense, fantastically misplaced ambition, and a scene where a blond with too much mascara and huge tits parades around in a shower."

== Sequel ==
In 2005 a sequel Intercessor: Another Rock 'N' Roll Nightmare featuring Jon Mikl Thor was made.
