= A Sound of Thunder (band) =

American heavy metal band

- Origin: Washington, D.C., Northern Virginia, Maryland, United States
- Genres: Heavy metal, power metal, hard rock
- Years active: 2008–present
- Labels: Nightmare Records (2011–2012), Mad Neptune Records (2013–)
- Members: Nina Osegueda; Josh Schwartz; Jesse Keen; Chris Haren
- Past members: Ben Washburn; Chris Willett; Dave Matine; Nathan Matzinger; TJ Marstiller
- Website: www.asoundofthunderband.com

A Sound of Thunder is an American heavy metal band from the Washington, D.C., metro area, United States. This four-piece band is known for its varying styles of musical composition, powerful female vocals, and energetic live shows.

== History ==
=== Background ===
Before joining the band, Nina Osegueda performed with the Washington National Opera, during their 2000–2002 seasons.

=== Formation, EP and single (2009–2010) ===
Formed in 2008 by Josh Schwartz (on guitar) and Chris Haren (on drums), the band went through several line-up changes before recruiting vocalist Nina Osegueda (formerly of another DC area metal band) in October 2009. In late 2009, the band recorded their self-titled debut EP, with former bassist Chris Willett back in a session capacity. The band recruited bassist David Matine and recorded a benefit single for the West Memphis 3, which received press and acclaim from the WM3 website and Motorhead. David Matine left the band in early 2010, and was replaced with bassist Ben Washburn. The band began performing extensively around the Washington D.C. area with Washburn on bass, and began recording what would become their first full-length album, Metal Renaissance. Washburn left the band in summer 2010 before completing the album, and Jesse Keen was recruited to act as both bassist and keyboard player. The band played mostly local shows and opened for various touring bands. They also played Flight of the Valkyries in Baltimore, Maryland.

=== Metal Renaissance (2011) ===
In March 2011, the band released their first full-length studio album, Metal Renaissance. The album included an instrumental intro by local folk group Painted Trillium, and was recorded on tape in an attempt to capture a classic analog sound. Bassists Ben Washburn and Jesse Keen both perform on the album. The band continued to play local shows, but also traveled to Chicago for Dame-Nation, a female fronted metal festival similar to Flight of the Valkyries.

=== Out of the Darkness (2012) ===
A Sound of Thunder decided to go in a different direction with their second album, Out of the Darkness. The band hired Kevin "131" Gutierrez, known for being a multi platinum award winning producer and having worked with Shinedown, O.A.R., Johnny Cash, and Raven. They recorded the album at Gutierrez' own studio, Assembly Line Studios in Northern Virginia. The band intended on releasing the album independently, but was suddenly contacted by Lance King and Nightmare Records days before their intended release date. After postponing the release, in coordination with the label, Out of the Darkness was finally released by Nightmare Records and Sony/RED on March 27, 2012. Having included a track with guest vocalist John Gallagher of the legendary heavy metal band, Raven, both the album and the band received more publicity than ever before. Out of the Darkness was released with rave reviews from various blogs, heavy metal websites, About.com , and The Washington Post. In addition to the album, the band also released their first music video for "Murderous Horde". The video, which featured Nina Osegueda and a black Burmese python named "Chubby", received over five thousand views in its first week. This was followed by a video for "Kill That Bitch".

=== Time's Arrow and Queen of Hell and The Lesser Key of Solomon (2014–2013) ===
In 2013, A Sound of Thunder released an EP, Queen of Hell, and a studio album titled Time's Arrow, both on CD and vinyl through Mad Neptune Records. The album and EP were partially funded by a successful KickStarter campaign that raised $9,539, against their $8,000 goal.

The same year, A Sound of Thunder created another KickStarter campaign to help fund a fourth studio album titled, The Lesser Key of Solomon. The campaign raised $23,375, exceeding their goal by $13,375. The album was released on September 9, of the same year and made 39th place in the Billboard magazine Heatseeker's Chart.

In 2014, Osegueda was featured on CNN and local news WTOP for her weight loss and use of heavy metal to continue living a healthy lifestyle.

=== Tales from the Deadside (2015) ===
On 25 September 2015, the band released their fifth album Tales from the Deadside, a concept album based on the Valiant Comics character Shadowman. Like the previous album, it was funded through a Kickstarter campaign, which raised $30,543, three times greater their initial $10,000 goal. The "Legion Of Thunder Exclusive" Pleasure Slave EP, consisting of six cover versions and three original songs, also featured special guests from national acts, including keyboardist Tony Carey (ex-Rainbow), Veronica Freeman (Benedictum), John Gallagher (Raven) and Nik Turner (Hawkwind).

=== Who Do You Think We Are? (2016) ===
In 2016 the band released their sixth album Who Do You Think We Are?, a full-length covers album featuring songs chosen primarily by the band's fans. The album is unique in A Sound of Thunder's catalog as their only Kickstarter-exclusive album. The album was initially made available only to Kickstarter backers. The album features covers of songs originally recorded by Alice Cooper, Ritchie Blackmore's Rainbow, Mercyful Fate, Manowar, Tool, Kansas, Black Sabbath, Wrathchild America, Dio, Dan Fogelberg, Deep Purple, and Judas Priest. The album was made available in vinyl, compact disc and digital formats. The album features a guest appearance by keyboard player Tony Carey (ex-Rainbow, Planet P Project) on the song "Death Alley Driver".

=== It Was Metal (2018) ===
In 2018 the band released their seventh album, It Was Metal, again produced by Kevin ‘131’ Gutierrez. Funded again on Kickstarter they raised $66,246, over two times their $30,000 goal. On June 15, 2018, the same day the album released to the public, the animated video for It Was Metal was posted to the band's YouTube page. It featured Brian Posehn as the voice of the dragon. MetalNation gave the album high praise:

"It Was Metal is nearly an hour long, yet feels like it flies by in hail of harmony, wailing vocals, and addictive riffs. Despite the wealth of melody and energetic feel of the record, A Sound of Thunder did not short change the listener on substance or depth. Every track feels like a mini-masterpiece unto itself. Each spin through the album reveals more details and invites another journey through. Every individual performance is on point, and while they all shine on their own, it is in the collective that they ascend to something greater. While the band may not see it as such, It Was Metal is A Sound of Thunder‘s seminal work to date."

== Band members ==
Current

- Nina Osegueda — vocals, lyricist
- Josh Schwartz – guitar, primary composer
- Jesse Keen – bass, keyboards
- Justin Finger - drums, percussion

Former

- Ben Washburn (2010) — bass
- Chris Willett (2008) — bass
- Nathan Matzinger (2009) – vocals
- TJ Marstiller (2009) – bass
- Chris Haren – (2008-2023) drums, percussion

== Discography ==
Studio albums

- Metal Renaissance (2011)
- Out of the Darkness (2012)
- Time's Arrow (2013)
- The Lesser Key Of Solomon (2014)
- Tales From The Deadside (2015)
- Who Do You Think We Are? – kickstarter exclusive (2016)
- It Was Metal (2018)
- Parallel Eternity (2020)
- The Krimson Kult (2022)
- The Golden Hourglass (2026)

Live albums

- Lesser Key Live – Official Bootleg Vol. 1 (2014)

Compilation albums

- Els Segadors (2017)

EPs

- A Sound Of Thunder (2009)
- Queen Of Hell (2013)
- Pleasure Slave – kickstarter exclusive (2015)
- Second Lives – kickstarter exclusive (2017)
- Queen of Hell: Initium – (2024)

Singles

- "Justice At Last" (2009)
- "Kill That Bitch" – download only (2011)
- "Lifebringer" – download only (2017)
- "Els Segadors" – download only (2017)
- "Theme from Shadowman" – download only (2022)
- "Chansaw Witch" - digital release (2024)

Videos

- "Murderous Horde" (2012)
- "Kill That Bitch" (2012)
- "I Will Not Break" – lyric video (2013)
- "I'll Walk With You" (2013)
- "Elijah" – lyric video (2014)
- "Udoroth" (2014)
- "Tower Of Souls" – lyric video (2015)
- "A Sound Of Thunder" (2016)
- "Who Do You Think We Are?" – kickstarter exclusive (2016)
- "Els Segadors" – lyric video (2017)
- "Lifebringer" (2017)
- "Els Segadors" (2018)
- "It Was Metal" (2018)
- "Theme from Shadowman" (2022)
- "The Rise of the Kirmson Kult" [Part 1 of the Krimson Kult Trilogy] (2022)
