= Sanctuary season 4 =

Sanctuary
- Season 4
- DVD cover art
- Starring: Amanda Tapping; Robin Dunne; Ryan Robbins; Christopher Heyerdahl
- No. of episodes: 13

Release
- Original network: Syfy
- Original release: October 7 – December 30, 2011

Season chronology
- ← Previous; Season 3

The fourth season of the Canadian science fiction–fantasy television series Sanctuary was commissioned by Syfy in January 2010.

== Cast ==
=== Regular ===
- Amanda Tapping as Helen Magnus
- Robin Dunne as Will Zimmerman
- Ryan Robbins as Henry Foss
- Christopher Heyerdahl as Bigfoot / John Druitt

=== Recurring ===
- Jonathon Young as Nikola Tesla
- Ian Tracey as Adam Worth
- Robert Lawrenson as Declan McRae
- Pascale Hutton as Abby Corrigan
- Brian Markinson as Greg Addison
- Agam Darshi as Kate Freelander

=== Guest ===
- Peter Wingfield as James Watson
- Paul McGillion as Terrence Wexford
- Gil Bellows as Caleb

== Episodes ==
No. overall	No. in season	Title	Directed by	Written by	Original release date	US viewers (millions)
47	1	"Tempus"	Martin Wood	Damian Kindler	October 7, 2011	1.38
Following immediately from "Into the Black", Adam Worth (Ian Tracey) creates a time machine and travels back to London, England, in 1898 to save his dying daughter, Imogen, with Helen Magnus (Amanda Tapping) in hot pursuit to prevent him from damaging the timeline. When Magnus loses Adam, James Watson (Peter Wingfield) finds her and quickly discovers she is from 2011 but must keep this quiet. Magnus also has to avoid meeting her past self. However, Adam has already changed the course of history by taking Imogen before past-Adam would ask for Magnus's help. Watson and Magnus find Adam, but on the way she encounters John Druitt (Christopher Heyerdahl), fights him off and warns him to stay away. When Magnus later confronts Adam again, she finds that Imogen has been cured. Adam decides to chase after Magnus but ends up accidentally killing Imogen. Magnus then gets hold of Adam's Praxian weapon and disintegrates him, restoring the timeline. Following this, Watson suggests that, to ensure that the timeline stays preserved, Magnus must live in solitude before she can resurface 113 years in the future.
48	2	"Uprising"	Amanda Tapping	James Thorpe	October 14, 2011	1.32
In 2011, with Magnus missing in action after Praxis's destruction, Will Zimmerman (Robin Dunne) is appointed the head of the Sanctuary Network. However, his authority is ignored by the United Nations, which gives the private company Lotus Defense Corps all jurisdiction over the abnormal refugee camp and the abnormal hordes advancing from three calderas. After the abnormal leader Thelo dies in an explosion, Garris takes control of the abnormals, attempting to resolve the rioting peacefully. Henry Foss (Ryan Robbins) enters the camp and convinces Garris to release the hostages. LDC General Villanova (Tom McBeath) launches a cruise missile attack against the Chilean caldera, so Will appoints girlfriend Abby Corrigan (Pascale Hutton) to break into the LDC computer system, where they learn Indonesia is the next target. Magnus resurfaces and finds that the Indonesian caldera is located over a basilisk feeding ground where an attack could result in a cataclysmic seismic event that would pave the way for the abnormals' invasion. This indeed is later revealed as the master plan of Fallon, an abnormal who had faked her death to instigate the war. Running on this information, Villanova stands down. Crisis averted, Garris arrests Fallon and agrees to have his people return to Hollow Earth to rebuild their society with Kate Freelander (Agam Darshi) appointed to oversee the rebuilding.
49	3	"Untouchable"	Steven A. Adelson	Gillian Horvath	October 21, 2011	1.47
The UN's liaison with the Sanctuary Network, Greg Addison (Brian Markinson), arrives at the Sanctuary, where Will and Magnus have to answer for a mission that has gone awry in Jakarta, Indonesia, to capture a fugitive abnormal who can bend people to his will. A team of soldiers had been sent by Addison and had killed one another, but Addison suspects that Magnus allowed the abnormal to escape. Addison proposes that the Sanctuary go under the UN's control. Magnus, however, refuses, so the Sanctuary Network loses all its funding. However, it is revealed that Will and Magnus have access to funds that not even Addison knows about and they want the UN to think a lack of funds has ended the Sanctuary Network, so Will and Magnus can start fresh. In the meantime, Erica Myers (Pauline Egan), Henry's werewolf girlfriend, arrives to announce she is pregnant. However, there are concerns when Erica cannot control her transformations. Magnus works on a procedure to correct it, though it would slow the pregnancy to two years.
50	4	"Monsoon"	Martin Wood	Damian Kindler	October 28, 2011	1.20
Magnus waits in an airport on the African island of Grande Comore to meet businessman Richard Feliz for financial assistance. However, armed robbers, later revealed to be abnormals who were government projects until the failed invasion, also seek Feliz, so they hold everybody hostage. Magnus escapes with another hostage, Dr. Charlotte Benoit (Sandrine Holt), and alerts Feliz's plane not to land. Benoit then reveals she was to meet Feliz so he could hide a virus she has in her possession, which can kill millions. When the abnormals know of this, they find a canister and escape with it. However, Benoit has tricked them; they have actually stolen a canister of nitroglycerin, which detonates in their plane. It is then revealed that Feliz (Carlo Rota) has been among the hostages the entire time. Benoit later passionately kisses Magnus, and they agree to spend some time together on the island. Meanwhile, Will and Henry search for a loose Steno, a revived abnormal species. However, Will discovers that Abby is also after the creature because, following the failed invasion, the FBI has set up an abnormal task force. After some initial friction, Will and Abby work together to catch the Steno.
51	5	"Resistance"	Lee Wilson	Alan McCullough	November 4, 2011	1.26
Magnus and Henry track an abnormal fugitive that has been captured by Homeland Security's abnormal division, the Special Counter-Insurgency Unit (SCIU), to the "real" Area 51, in New Mexico. When Magnus and Henry break in, they find that half-vampire Nikola Tesla (Jonathon Young) is the head of a secret research lab that conducts tests on abnormals. Magnus and Henry are dealing with a tentacled creature that appeared after the success of one of Tesla's projects, which used an energy rift as an alternate power source. However, the rift is gaining power. As Magnus and Tesla try to shut it down, the creature abducts Henry. Tesla manages to find and rescue Henry in the creature's nest, after which Magnus shuts down the rift. Meanwhile, Will and Bigfoot (Heyerdahl) help Galvo (Rick Howland), a Hollow Earth refugee, to send some of his people back home, but Galvo then kills the group. Before he is captured, Galvo reveals he is part of a Hollow Earth faction working to take back the surface. After Magnus and Henry return, they find Tesla has given them intelligence on many government-funded abnormal projects.
52	6	"Homecoming"	Robin Dunne	Damian Kindler & James Thorpe	November 11, 2011	1.32
Will travels to Monrovia, Liberia, to provide financial aid for that nation's Sanctuary but is mugged, resulting in detached retinas. While he is being treated, Will has several flashbacks of his strained relationship with his estranged father (Al Sapienza) before he was indicted for fraud. Meanwhile, Magnus and Henry reluctantly work with a couple of ne'er-do-well flying abnormals to liberate a shipment of red-listed abnormals. However, Magnus discovers the couple has stolen smuggled diamonds to buy weapons and then sell them for money to pay an abnormal smuggler to release orphaned child slaves, for whom the couple will then care. Although Magnus confiscates the weapons and diamonds, she helps free the children. Will later returns with his eyesight repaired and decides to spend his birthday having dinner with his father.
53	7	"Icebreaker"	Martin Wood	Martin Wood	November 18, 2011	1.20
Henry and a team from the UK Sanctuary headed by Declan McRae (Robert Lawrenson) explore a stranded icebreaker in the Bering Sea where the crew and their smuggled Hollow Earth abnormals seem to have killed one another. When Magnus and Will join the team, the expedition discovers that the deaths are the responsibility of the magoi, a species that Magnus and Will encountered in "Kush" and that manipulate their victims' perception and take their form. After Magnus says saltwater "supercharges" the magoi, the team moves their nests away from it, but one escapes and kills Henry's friend and fellow werewolf Alistair and takes his form. After Henry kills it, two more magoi are found to have escaped earlier. Those two magoi have been posing as Magnus and Will the entire time. This is discovered when the real Magnus and Will arrive. They kill the imposters. Will shoots the one impersonating him, and Magnus throws herself and her impostor into the saltwater, which the real Magnus reveals is actually deadly to the magoi.
54	8	"Fugue"	Damian Kindler	Damian Kindler	November 25, 2011	1.11
Abby has been attacked in an alleyway by what are believed to be Hollow Earth insurgents taking part in the insurgents' invasion plan. In the attack, her body has become the host for an abnormal creature that is taking over her body. Abby cannot speak and is slowly transforming to an abnormal. There is no known cure, but Magnus and Will find that Abby can communicate through singing. Though the singing slows down Abby's transformation, her situation grows increasingly bleak. Soon Magnus discovers a highly risky solution: she can implant another abnormal inside Abby so the creature already taking over Abby's body could use that other abnormal as a replacement host. However, that creature could then fight its way out of Abby's body and kill her. Magnus goes ahead with the procedure, which succeeds. The creature does burst out, but it is captured, and Magnus saves Abby.
55	9	"Chimera"	Martin Wood	James Thorpe	November 29, 2011	0.96
Tesla arrives to inform the team that a sentient organic nanite from Praxis has infected the base's computer system and threatens to spread itself across the globe. In an attempt to quarantine the nanite, Magnus and Tesla enter a virtual version of the Sanctuary. Assisted by an avatar of Adam Worth, they appear to succeed. However, Magnus and Tesla soon discover that the real Adam has fooled them by trapping them in the virtual world. As Adam becomes more powerful, he can take control of one of their bodies. When Tesla realizes his electromagnetic abilities can function inside the virtual world, he sends a message to Will in the real world. Will enters the virtual world, but Adam takes control of him. However, Magnus reveals she has tricked Adam. Will has actually downloaded a duplicate of his subconscious, and Magnus finds and quarantines the nanite. She and Tesla leave while Adam remains trapped and powerless forever.
56	10	"Acolyte"	Lee Wilson	Alan McCullough	December 9, 2011	1.51
Kate returns from Hollow Earth and warns Magnus that a cell of Hollow Earth abnormals is plotting a terrorist attack on the surface. When Kate and Magnus believe the abnormals intend to attack Greg Addison's summit meeting in Lisbon, Portugal, Magnus warns him. However, Addison reveals evidence that Bigfoot is a member of the cell. After finding further evidence to support Addison's claim, Magnus realizes Bigfoot has been brainwashed by the imprisoned mind-bending abnormal from "Untouchable". Will, Kate and Declan stop the Lisbon cell of abnormals, only to discover its plot was a diversion; the summit will, in fact, take place in a hotel outside Buenos Aires, Argentina, which Bigfoot will attack as a suicide bomber. Magnus and Kate break into the evacuated Buenos Aires hotel, subdue Bigfoot and escape before the hotel explodes. Magnus later breaks Bigfoot's brainwashing; however, when he returns to work, he clandestinely meets up with more abnormal terrorists.
57	11	"The Depths"	Martin Wood	Gillian Horvath	December 16, 2011	1.28
Henry discovers that teams from SCIU are leading a quest to a cave system in Bolivia to capture the legendary quetzalcoatl, an abnormal that even Magnus's father could not find. In Bolivia, Will and Magnus find the SCIU team has already captured the creature. Will is hit by a stray bullet, the creature escapes, and Will and Magnus end up trapped in a cave-in. When Magnus removes the bullet, she finds that the cave water Will has drunk allows him greater intelligence and rapid healing. However, as he goes without water, he begins to fall ill. By the time he and Magnus find a way out, Will is at death's door. She rushes back to a spring to gather more water and sees it is being filtered by a crystal; this is what SCIU should be after. They both return to the Sanctuary, where Will is weaned off the crystal-filtered water. Meanwhile, Henry records a series of video letters to his and Erica's unborn child while working on a new prototype shield armour suit.
58	12	"Sanctuary for None (Part 1)"	Damian Kindler	James Thorpe	December 23, 2011	1.12
Tesla arrives at the Sanctuary after having been fired by SCIU. Meanwhile, businessman Richard Feliz visits Magnus to tell her that he will no longer manage the Sanctuary's funds. She then agrees to meet with Caleb (Gil Bellows), the Hollow Earth insurgent leader, who claims he will spread peace in exchange for his peoples' right to coexist with humans and live in an empty area of Old City. Magnus agrees with Caleb's plan. This strains her relationship with Will at the same time that Addison recalls him to government duty, to work with SCIU. Will reluctantly changes sides. Soon SCIU learns that Magnus and Caleb have liberated several abnormals from a detention facility; Addison orders Will to arrest Magnus. She eludes Will's attempt to ambush her, so Addison, frustrated by Will's failure, orders government troops to lay siege to the abnormals' Old City homeland and lock it down, pending its evacuation. Addison feeds the media a cover story about a catastrophic toxic spill in the vicinity of the abnormals' new homeland. Magnus realizes that Addison has turned the homeland into their prison, so she approaches a news team that is reporting from the "toxic spill site" and goes live on camera to announce to the world the existence of abnormals.
59	13	"Sanctuary for None (Part 2)"	Damian Kindler	Damian Kindler	December 30, 2011	1.29
With the abnormals' Old City homeland now openly under threat, Magnus is forced to execute her ultimate stratagem, which she planned long ago toward a day when the Sanctuary's very existence might be doomed. Tesla discovers that, to contain the abnormals inside their homeland, SCIU has deployed devices based on one of his inventions, and Henry realizes that SCIU has weaponized the invention to eradicate the abnormals inside. Also caught inside the besieged homeland are Kate and Bigfoot. Bigfoot seems to join Caleb's cause against humans; Caleb presents a vial of a blue liquid. However, Bigfoot and Kate actually are working to stop Caleb, and they smuggle the vial to the Sanctuary. Magnus and Tesla learn the blue liquid is a virus that will awaken the abnormal DNA present in all humans. Bigfoot's spying is exposed, and Caleb's men severely beat him. Meanwhile, Will and Abby have traced Magnus's movements over the 113 years since she was stranded in Victorian London, in "Tempus". Will and Abby later temporarily shut down the Tesla devices deployed around the homeland so they can evacuate all the abnormals. Caleb and his men travel to the Sanctuary and confront Magnus. She escapes to find Tesla and tells him to track down Henry and get out. She kisses Tesla and they share a moment before he leaves to locate Henry. Now Magnus is alone to face Caleb and his remaining men. Tesla and Henry evacuate the Sanctuary, and Magnus confronts Caleb and kills him. She then takes the final steps in her ultimate stratagem, which detonates the entire Sanctuary base. Sometime later, after resigning from SCIU, Will visits the Sanctuary ruins. When Will enters the catacombs, he follows a tracer to see Magnus. Helen can finally reveal the truth. During her 113-year sojourn, Magnus' efforts had focussed on creating a new underground Sanctuary.

== Production ==
In January 2010, Syfy officially renewed Sanctuary for a fourth, 13-episode season, to air starting Autumn 2011. According to Tapping, producing a 13-part season was more practical than a 20-episode season, stating "I think 13 is a good number for us. Twenty was really hard. It was a great joy because we were able to flesh things out more. And I think had we been given more lead-up to starting our season, although we had a network pickup early. [...] We really only had five weeks to prep this entire season. And if we were doing 20, I think we'd all be in an insane asylum by now. Thirteen was like, we can do 13 with five weeks. There's no way we could've been prepared for 20." Robin Dunne has said that he will direct the sixth episode of the season, having had an interest in doing so. In describing what the fourth season would be about, Tapping stated the Hollow Earth story line would still be dealt with. She also requested that Magnus be given a love interest. The Sanctuary panel during the 2011 San Diego Comic-Con revealed that there will be a musical episode sometime this season.

== Broadcast and reception ==
The season returned to Friday nights and premiered on October 7, at 10 pm. The fourth season was the 64th most watched cable show in 2011, averaging 1.262 million viewers per episode and a 0.4 rating for viewers aged 18 to 49 years. It was up from the 997,000 average of the second half of the third season earlier in the year. However, ratings for the fourth season were down 13.44 per cent compared with the first half of season three in 2010.
