= Sanctuary season 3 =

Sanctuary
- Season 3
- DVD cover art
- Starring: Amanda Tapping; Robin Dunne; Ryan Robbins; Agam Darshi; Christopher Heyerdahl
- No. of episodes: 20

Release
- Original network: Syfy
- Original release: October 15, 2010 – June 20, 2011

Season chronology
- ← Previous; Season 2 Next → Season 4

The third season of the Canadian science fiction–fantasy television series Sanctuary, premiered on Syfy in the United States on October 15, 2010 and consists of 20 episodes. Created by Damian Kindler, the series was adapted from a series of webisodes released in 2007. The increased number of episodes in this season allows the producers to include numerous story arcs. The second half of the third season premiered on April 15, 2011 until it was moved to Monday nights on April 25, 2011.

== Premise ==
The Sanctuary team deal with the aftermath of the gigantic tidal wave released by Big Bertha while Will's life remains in balance but soon the errand comes to an end once Will leads one final plea to "Kali" A.K.A. Big Bertha in his near death experience to stop the destruction. Following Will's return to life two abnormals appear to him to rekindle his memory and in doing so Will remembers an important message that Gregory sent for Helen to find an underground city with great technology and secrets.

Later Nikola sends an SOS call and after his rescue continues to help Helen in discovering the secrets of the city which eventually leads them to a Hollow Earth atlas. Soon Adam Worth, a former acquaintance, tricks Helen and causes radiation poisoning (that should kill both Helen and Adam in a few weeks) so that she may show Adam the Hollow Earth. Upon Adam's interference Helen, Will, Henry and Kate enter the city to save Gregory and find a cure for the poisoning but only to be executed immediately when caught while Adam imprisons John, leaving Tesla and Big-Guy alone in the mysteries. Magnus is then revived by Ranna for answering and Magnus finds out that she needs her to help an abnormal from the events of 'KALI', thereby Magnus and the gang is revived and she given the cure and is reunited with her father, together Gregory and Helen save the abnormal and reach the surface back again while John kills Adam.

The show returned to its original format, featuring a new short story for every episode until Tesla and Magnus discover a Praxian Stronghold. This is revealed to have been taken by Vampires and as such was a Vampire Stronghold where a whole army of Vampires and their queen were buried to be awakened someday. Magnus views this as a threat and destroys the stronghold, but not before restoring Tesla to a Vampire again.

== Cast ==
=== Main ===
- Amanda Tapping as Helen Magnus
- Robin Dunne as Will Zimmerman
- Ryan Robbins as Henry Foss
- Agam Darshi as Kate Freelander
- Christopher Heyerdahl as Bigfoot / John Druitt

=== Recurring ===
- Jonathon Young as Nikola Tesla
- Ian Tracey as Adam Worth
- Robert Lawrenson as Declan McRae
- Paul McGillion as Terrence Wexford
- Pascale Hutton as Abby Corrigan

=== Guest ===
- Callum Blue as Edward Forsythe
- Sahar Biniaz as Kali
- Peter Wingfield as James Watson
- Peter DeLuise as Ernie Watts
- Polly Walker as Ranna
- Edge (credited as WWE Superstar Edge) as Thelo

== Episodes ==
No. overall	No. in season	Title	Directed by	Written by	Original release date	US viewers (millions)
27	1	"Kali (Part 3)"	Martin Wood	Alan McCullough	October 15, 2010	1.79
The tsunami hits the coast of Mumbai, but Kate Freelander is able to help evacuate most of the area before the first wave hits. Big Bertha launches an electromagnetic pulse, incapacitating Wexford's ship. Magnus approaches Forsythe for help. It is revealed the Macri died and Forsythe is fatally ill. Will learns that in order to speak to Kali, he has to die. In the afterlife, Will talks with Kali and other beings to stop the waves. Kali prevents the second wave from reaching the coast. To save Big Bertha, Magnus takes out Wexford's tactical communications tower, though he still fires blind and injures Bertha before she could stop the final wave. Will appeals to the beings to save Kali and his world. They grant his request and cause a series of earthquakes on land to cancel out the effects of the final wave, though Magnus is confused as to who or what is responsible. Will is later brought back to life with no memory of what happened. Magnus boards Wexford's ship, forcefully relieves him of command, and returns to her position as head of the Sanctuary Network.
28	2	"Firewall"	Martin Wood	Damian Kindler	October 22, 2010	1.38
Weeks since the events of the last episode, Will experiences recurring nightmares that strange beings are trying to get to his memories as well as flashes of what he experienced during his death. At first believing he is delusional, the rest of the team believe him when they see two strange abnormals Magnus has never seen before, who are capable of cloaking at will. The team are able to stun and capture them. When they awaken, in order to not divulge any information, they kill themselves through pyrokinesis. Regardless, Magnus using the device used by them to allow Will to see what happened during his death. There, he recalls that Gregory Magnus was there, and gave Will a cryptic clue, containing the numbers 26 and 34 with a symbol in between it. Magnus realises they are connected to gifts Gregory gave Magnus on her 26th and 34th birthdays. Together, the gifts create a realistic hologram of a city, though Magnus has no idea what she is to solve.
29	3	"Bank Job"	Peter DeLuise	James Thorpe	October 29, 2010	1.48
The team enter a bank in order to retrieve an egg of a red-listed Abnormal housed inside a safe deposit box. However, Magnus finds it has already hatched and taken someone host. To prevent anybody from leaving, Kate stages a bank robbery. As Kate stalls the local police and searches for a secret way out of the bank, Henry clears five of the seven hostages before police surround his van, and is forced to flee. The two remaining hostages are a teller (Gary Jones), who is the host, and a bounty hunter also seeking the Abnormal. The team are able to trick him into trapping the teller and the team in the vault, so Henry can break them free and save the teller's life. The bounty hunter, realising the trick, tries to escape, but is arrested while in possession of stolen cash, and hence takes the heat for the robbery.
30	4	"Trail of Blood"	Steven A. Adelson	Gillian Horvath	November 5, 2010	1.26
The team travel to the Colombian highlands to track down an SOS from Tesla, who has been kept in vein-vine material made by centipedes that have evolved from the source blood. After freeing him the team find a hidden Cabal research lab, which held the source blood before an explosion caused the blood to contaminate the centipedes and mutated them. It is also revealed Tesla was searching for it to recover the blood to become a Vampire again. Magnus destroys the lab and the centipedes, leaving Tesla empty handed. However it is implied that Nikola stole one of the centipide larvae. Meanwhile, Kate and Bigfoot investigate the death of Father Jenson, a priest who helped him find the Sanctuary in 1951. It is revealed the murderer was the police detective who was under the influence of some "mind-controlling" force. When they find him, he mysteriously dies from a cerebral aneurysm, leaving them to question who was responsible for the priest's death.
31	5	"Hero II: Broken Arrow"	Mairzee Almas	Alan McCullough	November 12, 2010	1.57
While evacuating some Abnormals, a group of mercenaries attempt to steal the same insects that made up Walter's super suit. During the struggle, the insects attach themselves to Kate, so she is taken captive. During an equipment failure during her captors' attempt to remove the suit, Kate's personality is altered and she runs away when her team arrive to help her. Magnus learns that Walter inadvertently leaked the information on the insect suit to Virgil St. Pierre, the grandson of one of Magnus' friends who took control of his security company, Inverset after he died; Virgil claims to have in fact built the suit for the government. Magnus attempts to lure Kate with the hope the insects would then take Walter host again. However, the insects reject Walter after discovering he is producing a film based on his experiences, and return to Kate. Later, Walter overhears that Virgil sold the suit to the Russian Mafia and is planning to destroy it rather than permit a third party to control it, which would kill Kate as well. Walter races to stop this and throws himself in the path of the shot intended to kill Kate. Magnus convinces Kate to transfer the suit to Walter, saving his life; Walter then stops Virgil and his men.
32	6	"Animus"	Martin Wood	Miranda Kwok	November 19, 2010	1.26
Henry is eager to learn more about his past and kind after hearing of a Werewolf sighting in Oldham, England. He and Will go undercover inside a facility that is later revealed to secretly harbor Werewolves. Henry finds out the staff are also Werewolves, and they set up the facility to care for their kind. They distribute medication to prevent transformations, but when a patient refuses the treatment they are made to take a different medication that makes them kill when they transform. The leader of the facility forces the medicine on Henry when he discovers this, but through help of Will, and Erica, the leader's niece, Henry becomes docile again. In the end, Henry convinces everybody they can transform at their own will. Meanwhile Nikola and Helen work on the mystery of the city that her father sent her, and eventually leap a few levels to discover a hollow globular atlas of Earth.
33	7	"Breach"	Martin Wood	Damian Kindler	November 26, 2010	1.48
Helen, Will and Kate follow an anonymous call to an abandoned building to retrieve an Abnormal only to find it empty. After Will and Kate leave, Magnus finds herself is trapped inside and time on the outside world freezes. She is soon attacked by Adam Worth (Ian Tracey), a man with a Jekyll and Hyde-type personality disorder and whom she believed to have killed a hundred years ago. He created a time field that speeds up time inside the building, and because of this he can teleport, but could only do this by wearing protective clothing. After Magnus defeats him, Adam reveals he knows about the map, and claims she needs him to save her father. When time resumes, Magnus and Adam narrowly escape the building.
34	8	"For King and Country"	Lee Wilson	James Thorpe	December 3, 2010	1.47
When Adam is taken to the Sanctuary, a series of flashbacks reveal that he wanted to become a sixth member of the Five, but is repeatedly turned down. Years later, the Prime Minister blackmails the Five into stopping Adam, who is planning to release a toxin across London; in return the British government will fund the Sanctuary. After stopping the toxin, Magnus chases Adam down in a mine; Adam willingly jumps off the edge into a river, but is saved by Druitt who later leaves him to die. Later, Adam's body arrives at the underground city and revived. In the present, Magnus finds Druitt in Phnom Penh, Cambodia to question him regarding Adam. It is discovered that both Adam and Magnus are dying due to the events from the previous episode. Adam admits to Will that he sent the two Abnormals to attack him in "Firewall", and claims that the map to the hollow Earth will lead to the cure of Adam and Magnus' affliction. Magnus refuses him access to the map. However, Tesla consults the Sanctuary charter and reveals if the head is physically or mentally compromised, the second-in-command will take charge; since Magnus is dying, she is relieved and Will takes charge; it is up to Will to decide whether Adam should see the map.
35	9	"Vigilante"	Steven A. Adelson	Alan McCullough	December 10, 2010	1.41
Against Magnus' wishes, Will agrees to let Adam see the map. There he reveals a hologram of a keystone which is located in Khövsgöl Province, Mongolia. Magnus and Druitt arrive there to find it missing, but soon learns it is in London. When they return, the map rejects it because it is fake. They retrieve the real one in Hong Kong. Meanwhile, FBI agent Abby Corrigan (Pascale Hutton) visits the Sanctuary with regards to Father Jenson's murder, prompting a further investigation by the team, where they find an alarming number of murders where the murderers die from brain aneurysms. Will, Kate, Bigfoot and Tesla discover a link between the victims: the killer is targeting abnormals and their supporters. The murderer is a man masquerading as a priest, who believes they are abominations. The murderer tries to escape, but Bigfoot kills him. Corrigan finds Bigfoot at the scene, and Will gives her information about Sanctuary operations. Magnus finds the gateway in Tibet and plans to go there.
36	10	"The Hollow Men"	Martin Wood	James Thorpe	December 17, 2010	1.47
Magnus, Will, Henry and Kate arrive at the gateway. Because there is only one source blood shield, Druitt and Tesla remain behind. Once inside the mountain, a rock slide splits Henry and Kate from Will and Magnus. The latter couple soon find themselves under attack from a Basilisk until they are rescued by natives from the underground. After they are set on their way, all four members are captured. Fearing something is wrong, Tesla and Druitt allow Adam to find an area near the underground city safe enough for Druitt to teleport. However, after Druitt and Adam arrives, Adam lures him into a trap and is imprisoned. In the end, Magnus, Will, Kate and Henry arrive at the underground city, Praxis. The city leader Ranna (Polly Walker) orders the team's execution for trespassing.
37	11	"Pax Romana"	Martin Wood	Damian Kindler	April 15, 2011	1.22
Ranna has Magnus resurrected to know the whereabouts of Gregory and Worth, meaning they do not know where the former is. Magnus then realises Praxis is facing destruction from its geothermal energy, and the superabnormal Cainan (like Kali) is not responding. Magnus offers to help on the condition the rest of the team are also resurrected. After Magnus' condition is treated, they learn that Worth arrived undetected to steal a power source which he believes has unlimited capabilities. While Will works to stop him, the rest find Gregory, and together learn the superabnormal is also dying from a parasite. After Magnus and Ranna remove it, they return to stop Worth, who is believed to have been killed by Druitt, after he leaves the message "All debts paid in full", allegedly from Worth's blood. Magnus' team and Ranna part on good terms but on a 'Don't call us, we'll call you' basis.
38	12	"Hangover"	Andy Mikita	James Thorpe	April 22, 2011	1.42
Magnus returns to the Sanctuary to find it disheveled just hours before it is to be visited by United Nations security inspector Lilian Lee (Françoise Yip). She first encounters a battered Henry, followed by a tied up Kate. Both do not remember the events of Magnus' two-day absence. Will is later found, as well as Bigfoot who is trapped in an elevator. The incident started after Henry stunned a Mollox, a docile abnormal which exhibited strange violent behaviour. Security footage reveals that the Mollux was a host to a thought-to-be-extinct parasite called a Pinepex. The Pinepex jumped from host to host, causing havoc among the Sanctuary personnel. The team also learn Lee took an earlier flight and is already present, with the Pinepex. After they subdue her, Magnus attempts to cover up the incident, only Lee remembers being attacked. Magnus successfully blackmails Lee into keeping quiet about the events.
39	13	"One Night"	Amanda Tapping	Damian Kindler	April 25, 2011	0.87
Will and Abby Corrigan are kidnapped by a gang of assassins named the Vendetta Crew whilst they are out on a dinner date, and are forced to save the life of their leader Horatio Gibbs (Edward Foy), a human/abnormal hybrid who has been poisoned. While at first believing the "date" has gone well, the rest of the Sanctuary team suspect otherwise when they hear Corrigan purchasing red listed abnormals. They find the two but Magnus denies the team clearance to rescue them, because by stopping the Vendetta Crew the Sanctuary will not know the location of a missing ship that is housing abnormals. After Will saves Gibbs, he lures the Sanctuary team to the ship and is arrested.
40	14	"Metamorphosis"	Andy Mikita	Alan McCullough	May 2, 2011	0.84
Will develops scales on his face, and is gradually mutating into a new reptilian creature. Magnus believes he was previously infected by a Cillobar from Hollow Earth. When Magnus makes contact with Praxis for help, she is told there is no cure and they should kill Will. Magnus continues to search for one anyway. Will soon fully transforms and is placed in confinement. Magnus appears to have reached a dead end, but later realised Ranna placed a secret message, leading to a fungus that when tested, can revert Will back to human. However, Will escapes the Sanctuary before they can start treating him. The team track him to a warehouse and tranquilise him. He is then brought back into the Sanctuary, where a few days later, Will awakens to see he has almost reverted to his human self.
41	15	"Wingman"	Peter DeLuise	Miranda Kwok	May 9, 2011	0.76
Will and Henry go on a double date with Abby and Erika, but Magnus insist they deliver an abnormal larvae to the docks. However the larvae has grown into an adult and escapes into the sewer system. They manage to lure the creature out by releasing a signal that imitates the squeal of the species' mate. Henry and Erika later end their relationship when they realise Henry will not leave the Sanctuary, nor Erika leave England so they can be together. Will, Abby, Magnus and Henry later enjoy a food delivery from Alfredo's, the fancy restaurant Will and Abby wished to visit since their first dinner date in "One Night". The episode is considered a clip show.
42	16	"Awakening"	Lee Wilson	Gillian Horvath	May 16, 2011	0.82
Magnus and Tesla investigate a former Praxian stronghold in East Africa, only to find evidence that it was taken over by vampires at some point. Tesla is wounded by a weapon the vampires used as traps. Together the two find a tomb containing the queen, Afina (Aliyah O'Brien). Magnus uses some of the fluid in the tomb to heal and "re-vamp" Tesla, but doing so awakens Afina, who after learning the vampires are extinct, traps Tesla and plans on awakening her warriors. By then Tesla escapes and Magnus reasons for Afina to rule over Praxis in exchange for her freedom. Because the map to Hollow Earth is booby-trapped to those with vampire blood, it explodes as Magnus and Tesla escape. Meanwhile, Kate has a lead to stopping a gang from kidnapping abnormals after receiving an old email. After stopping the operation, Will learns from Kate that she used to work in the operation since she was seventeen. She approaches the leader, Caster, to warn him if he murders her, the Sanctuary will come after him.
43	17	"Normandy"	Martin Wood	Damian Kindler	May 23, 2011	0.66
The entire episode takes place in Normandy, France on June 5, 1944, on the eve of D-Day. Magnus, Watson and Griffin work with the French Resistance to destroy a weather machine Watson invented, which the Nazis are using to defeat the allied forces for the upcoming invasion. Watson is captured and interrogated by Druitt, apparently working with the Nazis. When the two are alone however, Druitt reveals he is working on his own to alert the rest of the Five of the plot. He also reveals to have killed Adolf Hitler nine months before, meaning the current Führer is a double. It is also revealed the Nazis know of Druitt's teleportation ability and have placed measures to prevent him from escaping with Watson. After Magnus is captured also, she realizes that the Nazis are in possession of a fire elemental, and are using the weather machine to control it. Griffin meanwhile encounters a US Army team led by Captain Jack Zimmerman (Dunne), Will's ancestor, who aid in rescuing Magnus and Watson. The two later banish the elemental underground, allowing D-Day to continue.
44	18	"Carentan"	Steven A. Adelson	James Thorpe	June 6, 2011	0.92
Magnus' team and Declan travel to Carentan, Normandy to investigate a number of unexplained disappearances in the area, one of the victims is Ravi. When they arrive however, the team find the area under guard from a clandestine military group. She and Will sneak past the perimeter and find themselves trapped in a time dilation bubble, and find Ravi, who has aged 40 years, and an entire community. Anybody who attempts to leave will die instantly. During the months in the bubble, Magnus finds that it is growing, and will cover the entire planet in three weeks from the outside world's perspective. Later, Will, Magnus and Ravi face a dilemma when they realize that if they do destabilise the bubble, anybody who was born inside will cease to exist, meaning only those three would survive. Reasoning that the six billion lives are a higher priority than those in Carentan, they manage to build a device that destabilises the bubble before the military group outside could destroy it. However, Ravi is killed in the process. While recovering, Magnus decides to investigate who or what caused the bubble in the first place.
45	19	"Out of the Blue"	Martin Wood	Damian Kindler	June 13, 2011	1.20
Magnus and Will find themselves living as suburban neighbors with no knowledge of the Sanctuary. Will is a cardiac surgeon married to Abby, while Magnus is an artist. As time progresses, the two experience unsettling dreams where they are experimented on in water tanks, while at the same time seeing several blue infinity symbols. When the dreams get worse, Will and Magnus suspect nothing is real. They also realise that whenever they attempt to escape, something keeps them in the dream world. To combat this, the two decide to commit suicide in the dream by driving a car over a cliff. They awaken back in reality to find themselves in one of Virgil St. Pierre's labs, where he and Henry work on a cure after Will and Magnus were poisoned by a large worm-like abnormal from Hollow Earth in Mexico. After hearing that several Sanctuary bases are on high alert since the incident and the one in Carentan, the team decide to return home.
46	20	"Into the Black"	Damian Kindler	Alan McCullough	June 20, 2011	1.28
The Sanctuary view video images of a large group of abnormals from Hollow Earth surface in South Dakota. Magnus convinces the UN's appointed Lotus Defense Corps to hand over the abnormals to be guarded by them in a secure facility. Will recognises Fallon, who attempted to overthrow Ranna in "Pax Romana", and is now seeking refuge on the surface. Magnus later receives a visit from Druitt, who reveals Worth is still alive and intends to use the stolen praxian power source to create a time machine so he can cure his daughter, but doing so will cause devastating consequences on the planet; his first failed attempt caused the time dilation bubble in Carentan. Magnus and Druitt arrive in Praxis to find the city destroyed and abandoned, with Ranna and Gregory Magnus possibly killed. Meanwhile, abnormal Thelo (Edge) plots an uprising. When Will finds Fallon dead, Thelo believes Will killed her and attacks him. After Will escapes, Thelo holds every human and Bigfoot in the camp hostage, to demand his people's release or he will kill the hostages. Later, Will and Henry learn that Worth made agreements with several tribe leaders from Hollow Earth; Thelo's ploy was a ruse to allow for three abnormal armies in Chile, Indonesia, and Russia, to invade the surface. Magnus finds Worth and fails to stop him from activating his time machine; she gives chase and follows him to London, 1898.

== Production ==
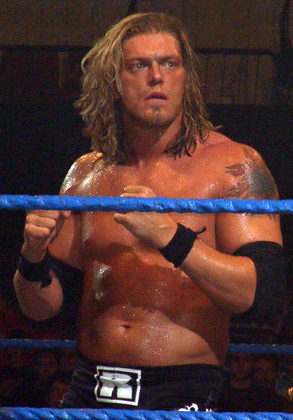
Former WWE wrestler Edge (pictured) makes a guest appearance as Thelo in the season finale.

On December 12, 2009 Sanctuary was renewed for a third season consisting of 20 episodes. It will conclude the second-season cliffhanger. The expanded season will also give the producers the opportunity to involve "really big story arcs", as well as exploring more on Helen's past and deal with "something that's much bigger than Big Bertha." Former Rome and Caprica actress Polly Walker will guest star as antagonist Ranna in two episodes during the middle of the season. In addition, former wrestler Edge (Adam Copeland) will guest star as an abnormal named Thelo in the season finale, scheduled to air during the Spring 2011. Production of the season commenced on March 15, 2010.

== Broadcast and reception ==
=== Broadcast and ratings ===
Syfy originally announced that the third season will premiere alongside the second season of Stargate Universe on September 28, 2010. However, they later announced it will be delayed until Friday, October 15 on their original 10 pm timeslot. The season premiere "Kali, Part 3" was seen by almost 1.8 million viewers and 1.3 household ratings. Viewership increased 17 per cent in total viewers, and 12 per cent among adults aged 18 through 49, compared to the average for season two. After the fall season concluded, the first ten episode averaged 1.483 million viewers, with an adults 18–49 rating of 0.4, per episode, making it one of the higher rated shows in 2010 for the network.

The spring season began airing on April 15, 2011 with 1.217 million viewers, a season low. Syfy later announced it would swap the show with Urban Legends where it was moved to Monday nights and be paired with Stargate Universe starting April 25 due to the low rating from the mid season premiere. However ratings for the show worsened, with 868,000 viewers watching "One Night". Ratings hit an all-time low when only 656,000 saw "Normandy". However, the last three episodes of the season saw a sizeable recovery, likely due to the ending of the 2010/11 broadcast season from the major networks; nearly 1.3 million watched the season finale. The spring season averaged 997,000 however, though Syfy picked up the show for a fourth season in January 2011. In Canada the season premiered on the Space channel on October 15, 2010. In the United Kingdom, the satellite channel Watch bought the rights to show the third season of the show. The previous two season were shown on ITV4.

=== Awards and nominations ===
The third season won three Leo Awards out of seventeen nominations. Jean Tejkel, Kevin Sands, Hugo de la Cerda, Kevin Belen won "Best Overall Sound in a Dramatic Series" for "Kali, Part 3". Christina McQuarrie won "Best Costume Design in a Dramatic Series" for her role in "For King and Country". Ryan Robbins won "Best Supporting Performance by a Male" for his role in "Animus". it was the second time he won the award in the category, the first time being in 2009. The season was also nominated for "Best Dramatic Series", but lost out to the final season of Smallville.

== Home video releases ==
The third season was released on DVD and Blu-ray by E1 Entertainment in the United States on September 13, 2011 and in the United Kingdom on September 26, 2011. The six-disc set consists of all 20 episodes, with audio commentaries from cast and crew on selected episodes. The set also includes numerous special featurettes: Visual Effects of Sanctuary Season 3, Amanda Tapping Directs "One Night", Hollow Earth, Damian Kindler: In the Director's Chair, The Music of Sanctuary, Behind the Scenes: Normandy, and Character Profile: Nikola Tesla, as well as a blooper reel.
