= End of Nights =

- Sanctuary episodes
- Episode nos.: Season 2 Episodes 1 & 2
- Directed by: Martin Wood
- Written by: Damian Kindler
- Production code: 201, 202
- Original air dates: October 9, 2009 (Part 1); October 16, 2009 (Part 2)

Guest appearances
- Christine Chatelain as Clara Griffin; Jonathon Young as Nikola Tesla; Lynda Boyd as Dana Whitcomb; Michael Benyaer as Assam; Babz Chula as Cabal scientist; Robert Lawrenson as Declan MacRae

Episode chronology
← Previous "Revelations, Part 2"	Next → "Eulogy"

"End of Nights" is the two-part season two premiere of the science fiction television series Sanctuary. The first part originally aired on Syfy and Space in the United States and Canada respectively on October 9, 2009, while the second part aired on October 16, 2009, both occasions following Stargate Universe. It subsequently aired on ITV4 in the United Kingdom on October 6 and 13 2009. Both parts were written by Damian Kindler, and directed by Martin Wood.

The episode follows from the season one finale, "Revelations", where the Cabal launch a weapon named Lazarus to turn Abnormals against Humans. The Sanctuary are able to find a cure by using a vial of rare, pure Vampire blood. However, Ashley, who was kidnapped by the Cabal and escaped, turned against her team and took the vial before working on a cure. The episodes follow the Sanctuary's search to find her, only to discover that the Cabal turned her into a super-Abnormal. The opening two-parter was met with generally mixed to positive reviews, and was viewed by around 1.8 million Americans.

== Plot ==
=== Part 1 ===
Six weeks since the events of "Revelations, Part 2", Helen Magnus (Amanda Tapping) and John Druitt (Christopher Heyerdahl) travel to Egypt in the search for Ashley (Emilie Ullerup), but learn that the daughter they knew is dead. However, in Montreal, Ashley teleports into an Interpol office, steals a server containing classified files, and teleports away. Meanwhile, Tesla (Jonathon Young) is able to create a cure to the Lazarus virus, though Bigfoot (Heyerdahl) refuses to take it due to the fact it was developed by Humans. Even Henry Foss (Ryan Robbins) fails to persuade him. The team find out about the break-in in Montreal, and discover that the files Ashley stole concern "Operation Montana", a British government operation to experiment on six orphans 25 years previously, to turn them into "perfect" humans, until Magnus shuts it down after she deems it a rebound of the Nazi eugenics programme. However, four of them have already been kidnapped by the Cabal. Meanwhile, The Cabal subject Ashley to tests by using the Vampire blood from Bhalasaam, where they attempt to convert her to a "Super-Abnormal".

Henry and Druitt recover the fifth Montana subject in Essex, while Magnus and Will Zimmerman (Robin Dunne) search for the sixth in Vancouver. They arrive to find that he has been taken by a group led by Kate Freelander (Agam Darshi), a con-artist with Cabal connections. She is captured by Magnus, but quickly escapes before they could learn anything from her. However, the Cabal finds out Kate was captured by the Sanctuary, and orders a hit on her. She is wounded during a firefight, but manages to flee and seek refuge in the Sanctuary. In exchange, she tells Magnus that she once visited a Cabal base in Alberta, Canada. Will, Druitt, Tesla and Magnus arrive at the warehouse to find Ashley is alive, but is now fully transformed into a seemingly indestructible Vampire hybrid, and that her original personality is destroyed. The team are able to escape before she can kill them. Magnus deduces that the Cabal are going to do the same transformation to the five kidnapped Montana subjects. In fact, the Cabal have already completed this, and declare war on the Sanctuary Network.

=== Part 2 ===
Magnus is able to make contact with Dana Whitcomb (Lynda Boyd), a high-ranking member of the Cabal. She is willing to hand over Ashley in exchange that Magnus hand over the Sanctuary Network. Refusing to give into the demand, Magnus enlists Tesla and Henry to develop a weapon capable of neutralising the hybrids' power, but wants it to be non-lethal, which Tesla finds nearly impossible unless it is completely lethal. During the time they finish a prototype, the Sanctuary bases in Tokyo, New Delhi and Moscow are destroyed by Ashley and her army. Magnus and the team realise the London Sanctuary is the next target, and they travel there to test the new prototype. However, despite the base's defenses, the hybrids break in and dispatch all the resistance they encounter, including killing Will's new love interest, Clara Griffin (Christine Chatelain) whom the hybrids were able to see when invisible. The prototype weapon is also unsuccessful, only stunning the hybrids momentarily before they overcome the effects. The team manages to drive off the hybrids with a fire elemental which forces them to retreat, but the London Sanctuary is badly damaged. With no other choice, the team and what personnel are left of the London Sanctuary evacuate to the main base in Old City.

Magnus resorts to upgrading the weapon to its intended lethal setting, which would kill Ashley in the process. Realising they may face another unwinnable battle, Kate Freelander is released. Though she tries to stay and fight, she is sent away as Magnus doesn't trust her. She would later stay and fight anyway. Magnus later visits Bigfoot, and leaves him a syringe of the Lazarus cure if he chooses to take it and save his friends. Henry maintains all the defence systems in the Sanctuary. However, the Cabal launch a virus to neutralise the EM shield, allowing the hybrids to break into the base with ease. Now with a fully functioning weapon, Magnus is able to kill three of the hybrids before she confronts Ashley, and attempts to talk her into coming back. After Bigfoot takes the cure and saves his friends, he protects Henry and Will while they restore the EM shield, which destroys the fourth hybrid when he attempts to teleport. Magnus faces off against Ashley and the final hybrid. The final hybrid attacks Magnus, but is stopped by Ashley, whose original personality (apparently buried, not destroyed) manages to regain control of her body temporarily. Ashley teleports with the final hybrid, killing it, but also herself in the process.

== Production ==
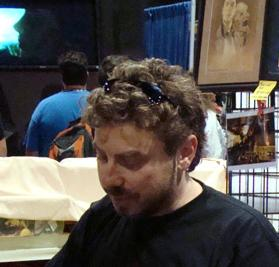
Damian Kindler wrote both parts of "End of Nights".

After the end of the first season, Damian Kindler wanted to tie up loose ends from the cliffhanger, and to settle the series into a "new groove." He considered two beginnings. One would start with the action, and the second would be the Cabal explaining their plans. Thinking the latter was too uninteresting, the former was chosen. Kindler also wanted to pick up the story line six weeks after "Revelations", since that was considered a good time to start. So the opening joined right in the middle of the hunt for Ashley. In the script, Emilie Ullerup had only one line of dialogue, though pivotal to the plot.

During the original casting call, Babz Chula's character was meant to be male, bald and German. However, Chula's audition impressed the producers enough to have her instead. Andrew Lockington was introduced as the new composer for the second season. Before filming began, the crew scouted locations in areas such as Montreal to get their understanding of the area before the episode was set there.

Like the series, "End of Nights" was filmed mostly in green screen. One scene required five actors to be in it, which was not an easy task since there was limited room on the set. In other scenes involving green screen, one side of the background was in fact real, which gave the viewer the impression of not knowing which side was visual effects, and which was not. The scene involving the tele-conversation between Will Zimmerman and Clara Griffin was filmed live. Christine Chatelain was filmed in front of a green screen twenty feet away from Robin Dunne. The scenes set in Cairo were in fact filmed in a back alley behind a Vancouver studio, which had been used several times before in the series. Visual effects were added in replacement of the green screen, for background to make the Cairo street look longer than the alley was. Another instance of inside filming for outdoor settings were the scenes involving Ashley's conversion process. The filming location was a large, tall room. Director Martin Wood previously used the area for filming Stargate: Continuum. The scenes between Christopher Heyerdahl as Bigfoot and Ryan Robbins as Henry Foss were completed on one take, because Wood was impressed by the acting and the camera angles. Furthermore, Heyerdahl was to wear contact lenses to change his eye colour for Bigfoot, however, at the time of filming, Heyerdahl sustained an eye injury.

Overall, "End of Nights" produced around 1,200 visual effects shots, which exceeded half of the 2,100 visual effects done in the entire first season alone. The premiere of the second season also had a slightly different opening title sequence. Though nearly the same as the first season, the producers changed the pictures of Magnus meeting Albert Einstein, to those between her and Amelia Earhart.

== Reception ==
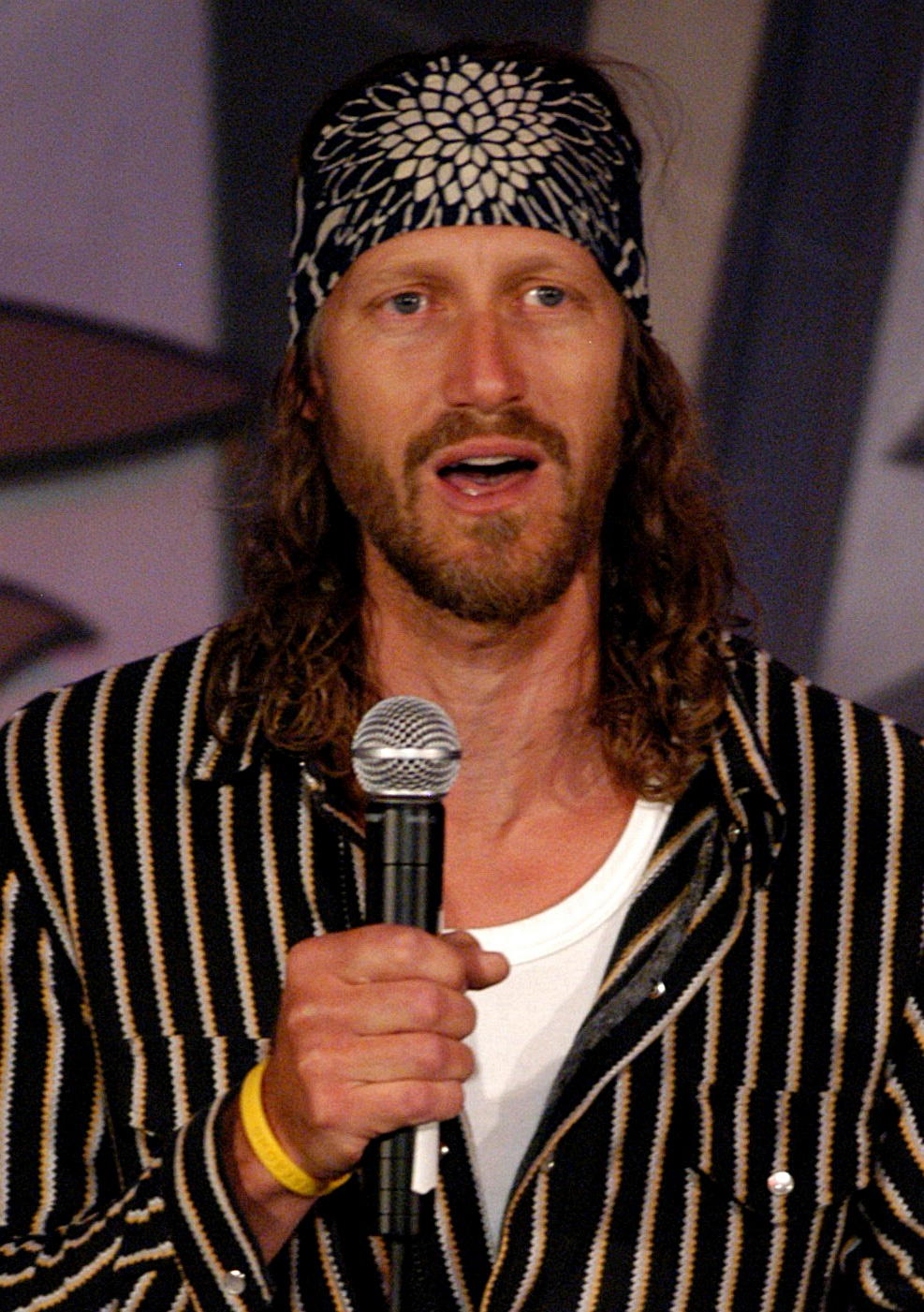
Christopher Heyerdahl's performance as John Druitt received some of the general praise of the episodes.

After the original broadcast, the first part was viewed by 1.85 million, among them are 946,000 in the Adult 18–49 demographic, and 1.15 million in the Adults 25–54 demographic. The viewing figures were up 18% from the first season average in the 18–49, and 7% from the 25–54 demographic. The ratings for the second part, however, dropped slightly to 1.77 million, though this still made Sanctuary the sixth most viewed series on Syfy the week it aired. In the United Kingdom, Part 1 was viewed by 334,000, ranking it the fourth highest viewing for the week, while Part 2 reached a slightly higher rating of 367,000, ranking it the third highest viewing for the second week.

Mark Wilson of About.com praised the episode for being a "harbinger of the new [and a more] confident Sanctuary" since the first season, as well as Martin Wood's directing of the story and Darshi's performance, but felt certain elements that didn't work well as they should, such as feeling more confined than the past episodes, and that the abnormals of the Sanctuary are barely featured. Paul Simpson of Total Sci-Fi rated the first part 7 out of 10, describing it as "hokum, but enjoyable hokum." Simpson also stated the scripting felt a bit sharper, though still high on melodramatic dialogue, and described the introduction of Kate Freelander allows a degree of fun. URBMN was mixed towards Christopher Heyerdahl's performance; stating he was uneven as Bigfoot, but excellent as Druitt, and also found Agam Darshi "surprisingly tolerable" as Freelander. Overall, the reviewer considered that while the episodes, and the series in general, bears similarities with Primeval and Torchwood, it was more the former than the latter.

Rob Vaux of Mania.com was overall mixed about the two episodes. He stated the first part doesn't leave much room for the newcomers to the series, but still holds a fair amount of interest, and was decently executed, and the low points remain "forgivable." Vaux praised Darshi's performance, but believed the other performers detracted her "appealine presence." Vaux believed the action sequences failed to catch hold, but improves with its character developments, stating the best moments involve Ashley's indoctrination, and Babz Chula's "creepy performance." For the second part, Vaux stated that enough of the questions have been resolved to provide adequate drama, and leaves a few plot threads to ensure the viewers tune in the next week, and it won't make the viewer regret tuning in. Vaux reacted more positively on the second part's action sequences, and Druitt's onscreen presence.
