= Will Zimmerman =

William Zimmerman
- Sanctuary character
- Robin Dunne as Will Zimmerman
- First appearance: Webisode 1 (web series) "Sanctuary for All" (TV series)
- Last appearance: "Sanctuary for None (Part 2)" (TV series)
- Created by: Damian Kindler
- Portrayed by: Robin Dunne; Dorien Provost (Young Will)

In-universe information
- Occupation: Forensic psychiatrist Behavioral Analysis Unit; Agent of the Sanctuary Network
- Family: Mary Anne Zimmerman (Mother, deceased)
- Relatives: Jack Zimmerman (Deceased)
- Nationality: American

Dr. William "Will" Zimmerman is a main character and male lead of the Canadian fantasy-science fiction television series Sanctuary. He is portrayed by Robin Dunne. Will is introduced in the series as an FBI's Behavioral Analysis Unit forensic psychiatrist, who was recruited by Helen Magnus (Amanda Tapping), head of the Sanctuary Network, to become her recent protégé.

Dunne was approached to appear on the series by director Martin Wood, whom he worked with before, but was initially reluctant to appear in the original web series. The second season of the show introduced more of a darkness to the character. In the third season, Will appears in a more leadership position, and becomes instrumental in the Hollow Earth story-arc.

Critical reactions behind the character, and Dunne's portrayal, were generally positive reviews, with some television critics comparing Will to Stargate SG-1 character Daniel Jackson. Dunne's portrayal of Will earned him a Leo Award for "Best Lead Performance by a Male in a Dramatic Series" in 2010. He was nominated a further two Leo Awards in the same categories and a Constellation Award, in which he narrowly lost to Doctor Who actor David Tennant.

== Character arc ==
=== Background ===
Will Zimmerman's maternal relatives are said to have come from Dublin, Ireland. One of his known ancestors was Jack Zimmerman (Dunne), who served in the United States Army and was killed in action in Normandy during D-Day in 1944. When Will was a child, he was terrorized by a violent creature who killed his mother. However, Will was saved by Helen Magnus (Amanda Tapping), who captured it. In the web series, he was a victim of Bigfoot (Christopher Heyerdahl) before he worked as a butler in the Sanctuary; Bigfoot liked to scare little children. In his adult life, he worked with the Federal Bureau of Investigation (FBI), until he was fired for his outlandish theories. He since worked with the Old City Police Department as a forensic psychiatrist, though his co-workers do not take him seriously there either. Before the series began he had a girlfriend, Meg (Kandyse McClure), who broke up with him.

=== Season one ===
The first season begins with Will investigating the deaths of two police officers; though the police believe they found the killer, Will believes there was a child in the apartment, but his theory was rebuked. He is later recruited by Helen Magnus to join her Sanctuary team, an organization who track down several abnormals around the world and give them refuge at one of their bases, and become her new protégé. She too believes there was a child, Alexei (Cainan Weibe), who killed his victims with an appendage when he feels scared. At the end of the pilot, Will eventually accepts his new position, having been promised "the adventure of many, many lifetimes." In "Warriors", his old friend Danny went missing, and he searches for him. He finds him but is captured and injected with the same drug as Danny to turn him into an Abnormal in a Fight Club-like organisation run by the Cabal, an underground organization who seek to control all abnormals, though he is eventually rescued and reverts to Human again. In the first-season finale, Will has a new love interest; Clara Griffin (Christine Chatelain), granddaughter of the late Nigel Griffin, Magnus' colleague; Clara shares his invisibility skills.

=== Season two ===
In the season two premiere "End of Nights", Clara is killed by Cabal superabnormals before their defeat, which greatly affected Will. In an alternate future in the season two episode "Pavor Nocturnus", which takes place ten years into the episode's future where the world is overrun by zombie-like creatures after Magnus unknowingly unleashed a virus while curing her longevity, Will is depicted as the only living survivor of the Sanctuary Network. He did at some point, have a relationship with colleague Kate Freelander (Agam Darshi), and had a son, Magnus Zimmerman following the death of the alternate Magnus. He starts his own survivalist group and sacrifices himself in aiding the present Magnus to correct her mistake. While on assignment in Mumbai, in "Kali", Will becomes host to a Macri, a creature with a connection to Big Bertha, the most powerful abnormal on Earth. He has the Macri forcibly removed from Edward Forsythe, which leaves him fatally ill. Despite this, Will still maintains a telepathic connection to Bertha, who appears to him as the goddess Kali, and he manages to reach out to her and get her to stop her attacks after Magnus severs Forsythe's connection to her. However, Terrance Wexford (Paul McGillion) takes command of the Sanctuary Network, and attacks Bertha, causing her to turn on Will and create three tsunamis.

=== Season three ===
In one final effort to convince her to stop, Will is to die so he can encounter Kali, along with two other beings, in an afterlife to convince them to stop the tsunamis. Kali uses her powers to stop one of the waves, but Wexford badly injures Bertha before she can finish. Will, figuring that the other two beings must be powerful, begs them to save her and his world, which they oblige, after which they resurrect him. Though he at first does not recall the meeting, but later two abnormals are able to access his mind, and he determines that Magnus' father, Gregory (Jim Byrnes), left him clues leading to Hollow Earth, an underground area below the surface that is thought to be the origin of the abnormal population. In the mid-season finale "The Hollow Men", he and the team enter Hollow Earth, but are captured by its security force, who execute the team for trespassing. In the next episode, he and the team are resurrected in exchange for helping the underground city Praxis from destruction from its own geothermal energy.

Throughout the second half of the third season, Wil enters a romantic relationship with FBI agent Abby Corrigan. In "Metamorphosis", it is revealed that on his travels to Hollow Earth, he became infected from a reptilian creature called a Cillobar, and is slowly transforming into one. He gradually loses his inhibitions, and escapes the Sanctuary until he is captured again when Magnus finds a cure to his condition, where he would transform back to human. In the season finale "Into the Black", Will overlooks the exodus of several abnormals from Hollow Earth, where it is revealed Praxis is destroyed, having been caused by Magnus' nemesis Adam Worth (Ian Tracey), who attempts to travel back in time to save his dead daughter. Later, Will discovers that Worth made agreements with several abnormal tribe leaders to invade the planet surface.

== Characterization ==
I really like the commitment that Will has. He's constantly terrified by what he's faced with at the Sanctuary, but is always putting that terror aside and committing to what the team has to do. And, I like that about Will. I find that a really good character trait.

— Robin Dunne

Will Zimmerman is described by Syfy as "a brilliant forensic psychiatrist" and a "master of behavioral science" who "can translate the most veiled human signals into case-breaking deductions." However, his fascination with otherworldy explanations for horrific crimes cost him the respect of his peers and position. His qualities have attracted the attention of Magnus, who offers him a position in the Sanctuary. He would become her newest protégé throughout the series. Magnus has stated to Will in one episode that he was her first protégé in decades to show promise.

In describing Will and Magnus' working relationship, Dunne stated; "there's a nice synchronicity that has formed between the two characters. And really, they're two people that depend on each other for survival. And therefore, that's where the respect comes out of." Tapping believed the reason why Magnus chose Will was that "she doesn't want a yes man," and wanted someone "intelligent enough and ballsy enough to call her on what she's doing wrong." Dunne classed Will as a man who puts Magnus in her place, and being able to disagree with Magnus, even if it is something she does not want to hear.

In a Blastr interview, Dunne explained Will's journey throughout the first season, and what has become of him for the second; "[In the first season] he spent time getting used to the sanctuary and having his foot in both worlds, but not sure which way he was going to go. By the end of season one, he jumped right into the sanctuary and resigned himself to that life. Now there's a lot going on for Will. Already he's had to deal with some pretty major things. These things that happen in the first few episodes [on the second season] dredge up some old memories of his past. There's definitely more of a darkness to Will, and he's kind of wrestling with some demons." As time goes by, however, Will begins to take more of a leadership role in the Sanctuary.

== Development ==
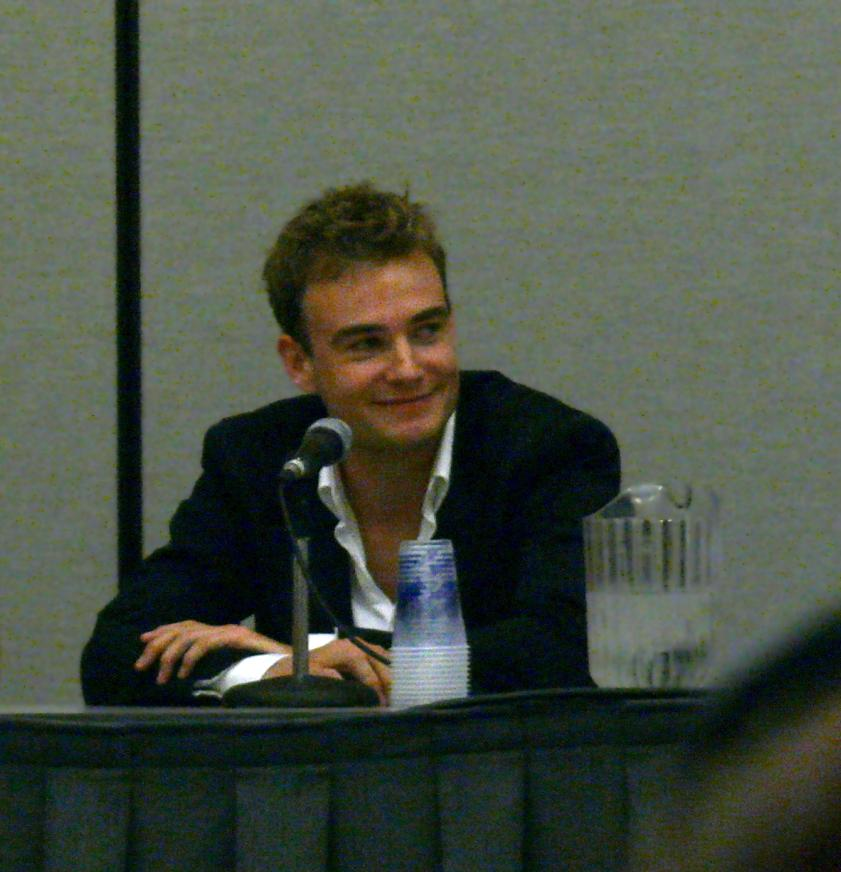
Robin Dunne, at San Diego Comic-Con in 2008 promoting the series.

Will Zimmerman came from an idea of a young psychiatrist "co-op[ing]" with the lead character to "track down monsters and help people" when Damian Kindler conceived Sanctuary in 2001. After the series was green-lit, director Martin Wood approached Robin Dunne, who he worked with a few years before, to appear on the show. Dunne was initially reluctant to appear on what would start as a web series; the medium did not receive enough media attention when he was approached. However, the actor was impressed with the script and went to Vancouver to film it.

When the series was adapted for television, the producers found that Dunne's portrayal of Will differed vastly. The television series also introduced "Will vision," a cinematic technique that shows Will's perspective on crime scenes (in frames, certain objects stand out). The effect went through several permutations so the producers can see what they could use to make it his vision without making it a superpower, because Will is not an abnormal. By the season one finale, the producers wanted to introduce a potential love interest for Will; Clara Griffin. Dunne contributed in the casting of the character by recommending Christine Chatelain; both worked together before; to the producers. In playing Will in the second season, Dunne found playing another side to the character was challenging, but found it exciting for the character's journey. "Pavor Nocturnus", shows a much darker side to Will. To give the character a more post-apocalyptic look, Dunne wore a mullet and white eye contact lens. Co star Amanda Tapping commented on Will's appearance; "When Robin came on set that day he freaked me out, he was completely messed up."

In producing the third season, particularly following the second episode "Firewall", Kindler made Will instrumental to the discovery of Hollow Earth following his brief death in the season premiere. In the same season, the producers decided to include a new love interest for Will that would not be killed off. A Will centric-episode in the second half of the season, "Metamorphosis", was largely filmed from Will's point of view. To complete this effect, Dunne wore a helmet camera. In the season's finale, Will fights with the abnormal Thelo (played by former WWE wrestler Edge). Dunne recalled spending a day filming the fight scene; "I had an entire day of just having the crap beaten out of me by him. And after every take, and you've got this big imposing guy on camera ... he's like throwing me around and punching me and clotheslining me and all kinds of stuff. And then [creator] Damien [Kindler], who was directing that episode, would call 'Cut!,' and then he'd come over and be like, 'Oh, man. I'm sorry.'"

Will's hairstyle went through several variations throughout the series, from "slightly nerdy to coated in hair gel." The reasoning of the changes was of Dunne's fondness for getting his hair done on set. In the fourth season, Tapping said that "everything that happens to Will [...] just gets worse and worse and worse, and he's still hanging in." Dunne would also direct the season's sixth episode.

== Reception ==
Critical reactions behind the character and Dunne's portrayal were generally positive, with some reviewers commenting that Zimmerman is somewhat of Sanctuary's equivalent of Daniel Jackson from Stargate SG-1. Mark Wilson of About.com stated that Zimmerman is the one character who "really pulls the viewer into Sanctuary's world. Instantly likable, able to seem intellectually gifted without being off-putting [...] Dunne's performance as Will is one of the more effortless realizations of the viewer-identification character in recent sci-fi/fantasy that I've seen." Tory Ireland-Mell of IGN believed that Will "does a great job not forcing himself into every situation like some sort of seasoned pro. Instead he is coming at it from a fresh point of view," also commenting that when Will was given a gun the reviewer "was about to be very disappointed that he can just shoot a gun, but with some clever writing, my disappointment was turned into relief when he couldn't shoot the gun, and Ashley told him he had the safety on."

Over the course of the series, Dunne's portrayal of Will have resulted in four award nominations, one of which was won. In 2009, he was nominated for a Gemini Award for "Best Performance by an Actor in a Continuing Leading Dramatic Role," for his role in "Requiem", but lost out to Flashpoint actor Enrico Colantoni. In 2010, Dunne won a Leo Award for "Best Lead Performance by a Male in a Dramatic Series" for the season two episode "Pavor Nocturnus". In the same year, he was nominated for a Constellation Award for "Best Male Performance in a 2009 Science Fiction Television Episode", but lost out to Doctor Who actor David Tennant, for his role in the episode "The Waters of Mars", by only one percent of the votes. In 2011, Dunne was again nominated for a Leo Award for the episode "Vigilante", but lost out to Shattered actor Callum Keith Rennie.
