= List of Sanctuary characters =

The main characters of Sanctuary Season 1, from left to right; John Druitt, Helen Magnus, Ashley Magnus, Will Zimmerman.

The characters in the Canadian science fiction-fantasy television series Sanctuary are predominantly "abnormals": advanced humans or creatures, and the show centers on bringing other abnormals to the Sanctuary in the fictional Old City, for the purpose of protecting the public, as well as the abnormals themselves. Most of the Sanctuary team are abnormals, despite looking human: Helen Magnus (Amanda Tapping) has longevity, John Druitt (Christopher Heyerdahl) and Ashley Magnus (Emilie Ullerup) can teleport, and Henry Foss (Ryan Robbins) is a werewolf. Even Will Zimmerman (Robin Dunne) was twice turned to an abnormal temporarily: firstly in the episode "Warriors", then later in the episode "Metamorphosis". Several of the actors who play their respective characters have been nominated for Leo and Constellation Awards.

== Main characters ==
=== Helen Magnus ===
Doctor Helen Magnus, played by Amanda Tapping is a 174-year-old teratologist (born August 27, 1850, and sent back in time 113 years.) and head of the Sanctuary in Old City. She was born in England during the Victorian era, and was one of the first female doctors and scientists of the Royal College of Surgeons in London. Her father, Gregory Magnus, taught her about his private research of studying and helping the Abnormals. She later builds the Sanctuary Network in Old City using her father's designs to accommodate the Abnormals. On one hunt, she saves Will Zimmerman during his childhood from a deadly Abnormal, though she is unable to rescue his mother. Decades later, she recruits Will as her protege.

=== Will Zimmerman ===
Doctor Will Zimmerman, played by Robin Dunne is a police forensic psychiatrist, who possesses natural empathic abilities and a sense of perception. This trait leaves him unpopular with his bosses, and he is often ridiculed or ignored for theories that are "out of the box". Sometime before the series, his girlfriend, Meg (Kandyse McClure) breaks up with him. Will secretly suffers nightmares due to an encounter with an Abnormal that left his mother dead. While investigating the mysterious deaths of two local police officers, Will is confronted and eventually recruited by Helen Magnus to help treat her patients (specifically those who are difficult to reach emotionally and need to be convinced to trust her). Though highly skeptical of things that science cannot explain, he learns to accept all things extraordinary. He spends his time in the series on his travels with Magnus and the rest of the Sanctuary crew.

=== Ashley Magnus ===
Ashley Magnus, played by Emilie Ullerup (webisodes & seasons 1–2) is the daughter of Helen Magnus and John Druitt. After her conception, Helen kept the frozen embryo for over a century. When she could no longer bear the loneliness from her longevity and from losing Druitt, though she is at first unaware of it, she retrieves the embryo. Despite what Ashley lacks in behavioral skills, she more than makes up for it as an expert monster hunter, becoming proficient in using advanced weaponry and technology. Ashley is quite close to her mother and provides a counterbalance to Helen's desire to protect Abnormals, as she normally doesn't hesitate in terminating hostile ones and using whatever methods necessary to capture targets. She is on good terms with Sylvio (known as Ernie in the Web series) and his men, though Helen thinks otherwise. In "The Five", she learns that Druitt is her father (she was made aware of it in the fourth Webisode), and eventually comes to accept it.

In the Season 1 finale "Revelations", Ashley and Henry Foss break into a Cabal weapons facility to retrieve the files relating to "Lazarus", the weapon used to turn Abnormals on Humans, but are captured by the Cabal, who drug her and turn her into an Abnormal, inheriting her father's teleportation abilities. After the two escape, she is forced by Dana Whitcomb who now controls her to steal the vial of Vampire-blood taken by the team to cure the weapon, and escapes to the Cabal facility on Easter Island, where she is formally welcomed to The Cabal. In the season 2 premiere "End of Nights", the Cabal use the Vampire-blood to convert her into a Vampire-hybrid, which apparently destroys her personality. They then use her DNA to create five more hybrids, who start taking down the Sanctuary network. During an attack against the Old City facility, Ashley reasserts her original personality long enough to save her mother, apparently killing herself in the process by teleporting while the EM shield is up with the last hybrid. Magnus believes Ashley survives, but her searches are fruitless, Magnus is forced to accept that she is gone.

=== Bigfoot ===
"Bigfoot", also known as big guy or biggie, played by Christopher Heyerdahl, who also plays John Druitt is an intelligent Neanderthal-like species, and a former patient of Dr. Magnus. Before he met Magnus, he liked to scare children. Magnus retrieved him (over fifty years ago) and has said to have removed "more than a few bullets" from him, and when he refused to leave her, she appointed him a place in her staff, where he mostly acts as a butler, chauffeur, body guard and general handy man. He is allergic to flowers. He admits to Will Zimmerman that he once scared him for fun during his childhood. Though he does appear to be afraid of him at first, Will grows to respect and befriend him. In the season 1 finale, he becomes infected with the Cabal bioweapon designed to turn abnormals against humans, and is confined to a cell, with the team hoping that a vial of Vampire blood used to try to stop the weapon would reverse his rampage. In the season 2 premiere, Bigfoot refuses to take the cure Tesla has developed, because taking anything made by humans would be against his people's beliefs, even though he is already an outcast to them. However, he eventually takes the serum to help his friends battle the Vampire-hybrids, after some persuasion by Magnus.

Throughout the series, Bigfoot uses the caveman-like "ack, ack" expression. According to Damian Kindler, Heyerdahl invented it for his character. The expression has made an effect on the crew, who also sometimes uses the impression while on break as communicating each other.

=== John Druitt ===
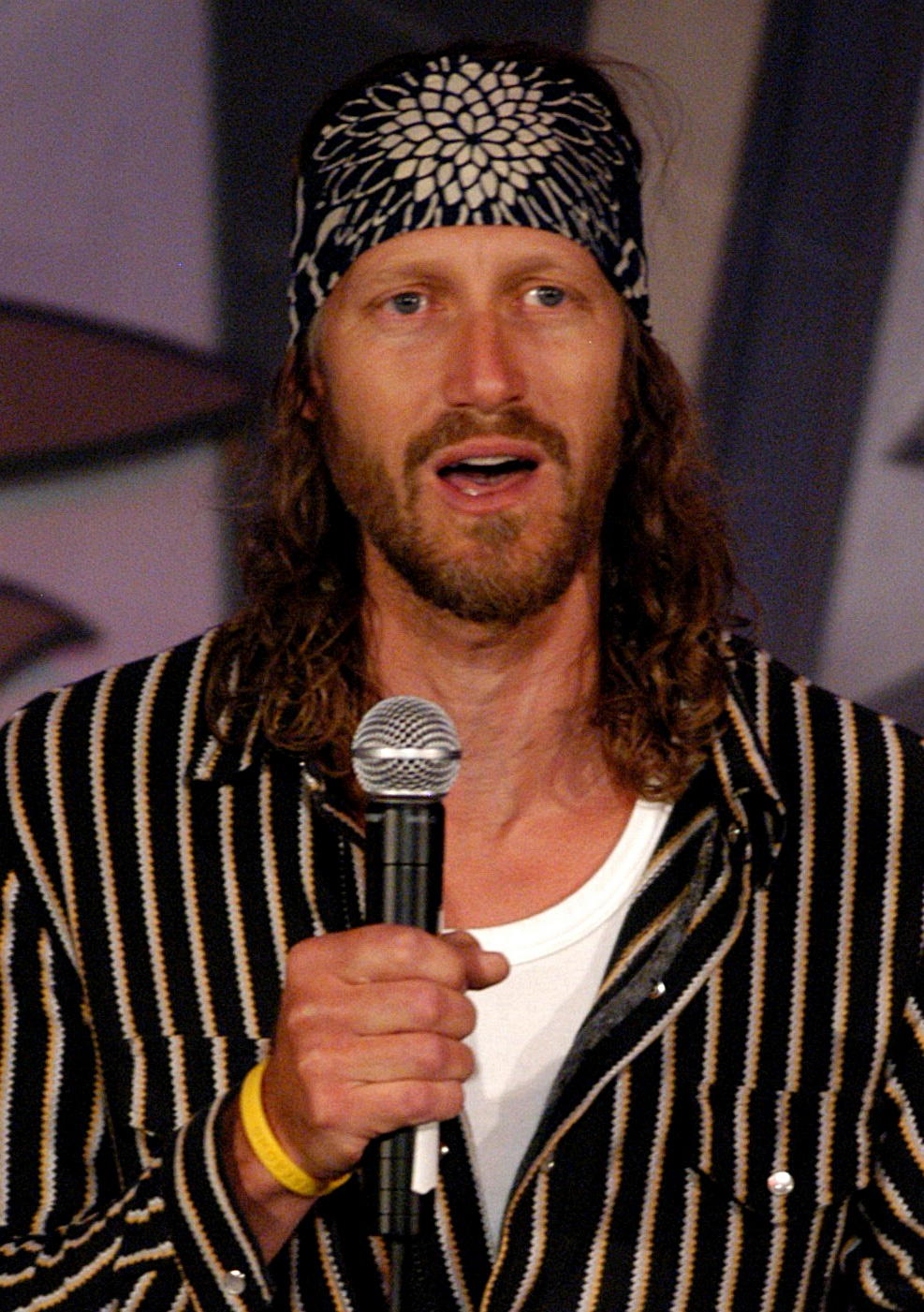
Christopher Heyerdahl plays "Bigfoot" and John Druitt

Montague John Druitt, played by Christopher Heyerdahl is the primary antagonist of the opening webisodes and TV pilot. He is a member of "The Five" during the Victorian era and Helen's former lover. As a member of "The Five", he has the ability to teleport at will. However, in one instance, he was taken hostage by an energy creature, which drives him into homicidal behaviour, and becomes Jack the Ripper, murdering eight prostitutes. He reappears in "Sanctuary for All", where he allows himself to be captured by his daughter, Ashley and brought to the Sanctuary to confront Helen, since he is dying. He sabotages the Sanctuary's defenses and uses his power to put Ashley's life in danger to force Helen to give him her blood, which he says she gave him to save his life once before. She acquiesces, but gives him a poisoned sample; his body becomes unstable and he teleports out. In "The Five", he is revealed to have been revived by fellow "Five" member, Nikola Tesla. When Druitt refuses to join his cause, Tesla tortures him, but that apparently either weakens or otherwise disables the energy creature, and abates his violent tendencies. He escapes and captures Ashley, in order for her to help him save Magnus from Tesla, who he believes is set to kill her. He convinces Ashley, and they rescue Magnus from Tesla and the Cabal in Rome.

He returns again in "Revelations" to aid the Sanctuary team in stopping the Cabal from bringing about a war between humans and Abnormals with the biological weapon "Lazarus". Aided with other members of the "Five", the group successfully retrieves the vial of pure vampire blood needed to find a cure for the weapon. However, in the end, the vial is stolen by Ashley, who defects to the Cabal, by whom she was brainwashed previously. After his daughter is apparently killed, he teams up with Tesla and manages to take down several Cabal cells. After returning to the Sanctuary, he reverts to a psychotic murderer, due to the energy creature reasserting itself. The energy creature is released, and locks down the building to kill everyone inside. Druitt saves everybody by teleporting to the same area as the creature, allowing it to take him host again, and then teleporting away. In season 3, Helen tracked him down in the Philippines, as she needed his help to get to her father's mystery city. He was still unstable, but slightly less murderous than before, and so proved immensely helpful in the quest. As part of a larger plot, Adam Worth deceived him, and Druitt was violently tortured. Their next encounter was quite bloody. However, Worth managed to convince Druitt to let him live in exchange for a chance to travel back in time and prevent himself from gaining his powers and madness. Worth broke his word and so Druitt teamed up with Magnus in an attempt to stop him. This required Druitt to absorb large amounts of energy, strengthening his violent parasite and having an unknown effect on his sanity.

When Christopher Heyerdahl was offered a role in the web series, he read several characters and got interested in Druitt, immediately admiring the character. He was surprised yet elated that he got the part of Druitt. Jason Hughes of TV Squad said that Heyerdahl has done a good job at playing sinister, and that the actor fits the stereotype for tall, pale and bald antagonists. For his role as Druitt in "Revelations (Part 2)", Christopher Heyerdahl was nominated for a Leo Award for "Best Supporting Performance by a Male in a Dramatic Series".

=== Henry Foss ===
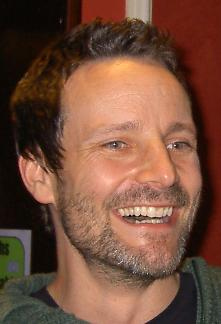
Ryan Robbins plays Henry Foss

Henry Foss (referred to as Hank by Kate Freelander), played by Ryan Robbins (seasons 2–4; recurring webisodes and season 1) was found on the Moors as a child by Helen Magnus. (In the webisodes, however, he is the descendant of Gregory Magnus' first weaponsmith.) He is a friend of Ashley and of Bigfoot. He is a self-proclaimed geek in computer science, as well as a weapons designer, including the construction of a short-wave sonic weapon, and often supplies new gear to Ashley for missions, as well as regularly maintaining Sanctuary's defenses such as an EM shield, keeping them working just as well. Like many among the Sanctuary, he is an Abnormal, a werewolf (a class nine hyper-accelerated protean life form or HAP). He took diazepam to suppress his werewolf abilities, but quit the drug upon realizing that his abilities are controllable. He considered surgery from Helen to rid his werewolf side, but ultimately chose to not undergo the surgery. He can transform at will. Until recently, he has been unable to find or communicate with other HAPs. He investigated a werewolf sighting in Northern England and was able to locate a group of HAPs living in a restricted sanitarium and taking medication to suppress their werewolf transformations, believing they will become uncontrolled monsters. He shows them otherwise and begins a romantic relationship with one of them, Erica. His ability has proven useful, including an incident where he is able to harness his power and escape from the Cabal, who plan to turn him into a werewolf permanently.

Actor Ryan Robbins described his role as "by far the easiest to work on", compared to his other prominent roles in television, including Ladon Radim in Stargate Atlantis, and Charlie Connor in Battlestar Galactica. Foss was a recurring character in Season 1, but was upgraded to a main character for Season 2. For his role as Henry Foss in "Edward", Ryan Robbins won a Leo Award for "Best Guest Performance by a Male in a Dramatic Series".

=== Kate Freelander ===
Kate Freelander, played by Agam Darshi (seasons 2–3; recurring season 4) is a con-artist with Cabal connection and has a vast knowledge of their tactics and movements. She was born in Mumbai but raised in Chicago, and left after her father (who was a safecracker for a gang) was murdered by Jimmy, a former gang member who later assists Magnus. She first appears in the second-season premiere, "End of Nights". She reluctantly switches sides to the Sanctuary after she is head hunted by the Cabal, and assists them combating the Vampire-hybrids. She becomes a member of the Sanctuary, taking over Ashley's duties, and helps recapture an Abnormal she accidentally released that now thinks she is its mother. In an alternate future, she and Will had a son named Magnus Zimmerman, though being in the probable future, their relationship never took place. However she expresses by far the most concern for Will during his disappearance suggesting she has feelings for him. When Will is brought to the edge of death to contact Kali, Kate shows great concern for him, telling him he will return and doesn't give up on him, even when he's apparently gone and is visibly relieved when he returns to life. She also shows great concern for Will in Metamorphosis, and several times appears about to tell him something and then turning away. She is absent for much of season four, having agreed to go underground to help the Hollow Earth Abnormals as they attempt to rebuild their society. This decision is heavily influenced by her blossoming romance with Garris, one of their leaders.

== Recurring characters ==
=== Nikola Tesla ===
Nikola Tesla, played by Jonathon Young (recurring) is a member of the Five, where the vampire blood he was injected with activated his dormant Vampiric genes, resulting in him becoming part-vampire, as well as gaining the ability to control electricity. He also has a taste for expensive wine. He despises humanity for destroying the pure-blooded vampires centuries ago. Tesla eventually leaves the Five and goes underground for over 60 years to resurrect his vampiric ancestors. He attempts to get John Druitt to join him, but John refuses. Tesla responds by torturing him, though this unwittingly restores Druitt's sanity. Tesla wants Helen to join him also, but she refuses, even after he kills and resurrects the Cabal members who are hunting them. He is seemingly killed by Druitt before Tesla can kill her. He later regenerates and returns alone to Bhalasaam, the lost city which housed the last of the vampires. He reluctantly joins the rest of the Five in undergoing various trials to gain a vial of vampire blood needed to stop the Cabal's bioweapon Lazarus. In his trial, he is forced to endure a severe electrical charge.

In the second season, he develops a cure for the Lazarus virus and a weapon to neutralise the powers of Vampire-hybrids, who attempt to take down the Sanctuary network. He later aids Druitt in taking down several Cabal cells. Later, Tesla opens a clinic in Mexico, which he uses to infect wealthy drug-addicted teenagers with a treatment that will slowly change them into Vampires in 30 years, after they inherit positions of power from their parents, effectively creating a new vampire age of enlightenment (in Sanctuary, Vampires are responsible for the age of enlightenment before they were driven extinct by humanity at the dawn of The Dark Ages). However, he overlooks the possibility that they may die within the 30-year development. One of his patients dies and subsequently resurrects in a car crash, only to kill all of his friends from the clinic, thereby activating the vampire genes and resurrecting them as well. Tesla teams up with the Sanctuary to reverse the transformation, but loses his own Vampiric powers by accident. He then decides to continue in his efforts to take over the world and also discovers that he now has the ability to control magnetism instead of electricity.

In Season 3, Nikola sends an SOS call to the sanctuary team from the mountains of Colombia where he finds a mutated centipede in an abandoned Cabal research facility that could contain traces of source blood required to become a vampire once again. After Helen rescues Tesla, he and Magnus start deciphering the clues of the map of the underground city of Praxis that Gregory Magnus sent to Helen. To apologize for leaving him at the Sanctuary during the expedition to the city, Magnus takes him to a former Praxian stronghold, where he regains his vampiric abilities from the blood of a surviving vampire queen kept in stasis and loses his reverence for his ancestors when she expresses the desire to enslave the human race. Magnus and Tesla trick her into attempting to read the map of Praxis while they escape the stronghold, and the queen is killed when the vampire failsafe in the Praxian technology destroys the entire complex.

In the fourth season, Magnus discovers that Tesla has been appointed the head of SCIU, the U.S. government's anti-abnormal task force, headquartered at Area 51, in the southeastern desert (the one in Roswell is apparently a decoy), where Tesla defrauds the US government out of research funding intended for an Abnormal final solution, instead focusing on his own pursuits of inventing wireless, limitless electricity from the radiation of the temporal rift. While Magnus is furious with Tesla over assisting the SCIU, he makes amends by sending her the blueprints of the facility. Shortly afterward, he is inevitably fired from SCIU when they discover he is using the research money for his personal science projects. For the remainder of the season he assists the Sanctuary in their stand against an abnormal terrorist cell.

Jonathon Young plays Tesla during a theatrical tour from "The Electric Company", as well as win festivals with it. For his role as Nikola Tesla, Young received a 2009 Leo Award nomination for "Best Guest Performance by a Male in a Dramatic Series", along with Ryan Robbins; the latter won the award.

=== James Watson ===
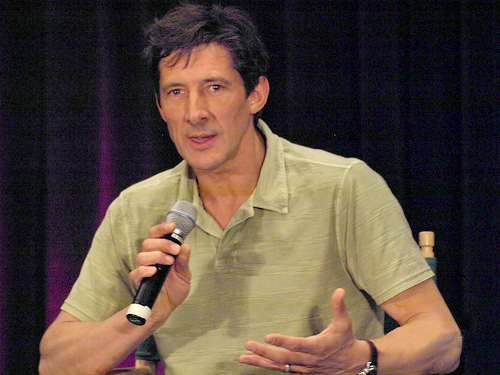
Peter Wingfield plays James Watson

James Watson, played by Peter Wingfield (seasons 1 & 3–4) is a member of "The Five", who displays great intelligence, enough to build a powered exoskeleton to keep him alive for over a century. Like other members of the Five, Watson is an allusion to a historical figure. The in-universe story is that Arthur Conan Doyle patterned Sherlock Holmes' deductive genius on Watson. However, out of respect of Watson's privacy, Conan Doyle created the "Holmes" pseudonym for the detective, and named the sidekick "Watson".

He was the head of the UK Sanctuary. He had a friendship with John Druitt, until he realized that Druitt was Jack the Ripper, the man he wanted to investigate and capture. This led to him seemingly hating Druitt more than any other member of "The Five". Druitt also appeared to be more upset with the loss of Watson's friendship than any other member of "The Five", indicating how close they once were. Currently, it appears that he only remained close to Magnus. In "Revelations" he assists the rest of the Five to acquire a vial of vampire blood to stop the Cabal, who plans to launch the bioweapon "Lazarus" to infect the abnormals and turn them against humans. They retrieve the vial through tests, one testing his intelligence. This test also helped restore the friendship he and Druitt once had. However, by the time they retrieve the vial, his exoskeleton fails, and Watson ages over 100 years in mere minutes. Before he dies, he tells Will to think of what they missed, since the retrieval seemed too easy.

=== Joe Kavanaugh ===
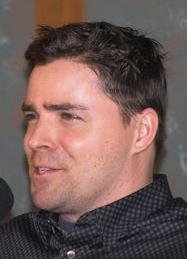
Kavan Smith plays Joe Kavanaugh

Joe Kavanaugh, played by Kavan Smith (webisodes & season 1) is a Detective for the Old City Police Department. He seems unappreciative of Zimmerman's work, and rejects his theories in certain crime scenes. However, after Zimmerman leaves to join the Sanctuary, Kavanaugh occasionally finds himself asking Zimmerman's opinion with other unusual cases, including one incident in "Edward", and with time gains respect for Zimmerman's talents and beliefs.

=== Clara Griffin ===
Clara Griffin, played by Christine Chatelain (recurring Season 1–2) is the granddaughter of Nigel Griffin (Vincent Gale), who was a member of "The Five". She had inherited the power of invisibility. His powers were passed on to his daughter, and to Clara after he dies of natural causes. The Sanctuary finds her in Baton Rouge, Louisiana, where she reluctantly joins the team to stop the Cabal's "Lazarus" bioweapon. She uses her invisibility powers to gather a key to acquire a vial of vampire blood to stop Lazarus, though it is later stolen by Ashley who defects to the Cabal. In Season 2 she has a relationship with Will. However, she is killed by Super Abnormals, who are able to see through her invisibility.

=== Dana Whitcomb ===
Dana Whitcomb, played by Lynda Boyd (recurring Season 1–2), is the director of Operations and Logistics in the Cabal, and oversees several of their operations, including the Lazarus virus and the conversion of Ashley Magnus into a Super Abnormal. After the Sanctuary defeat the Cabal in the beginning of the second season, Whitcomb goes on the run. However, Druitt is able to track her down, though her fate is unknown.

=== Terrance Wexford ===
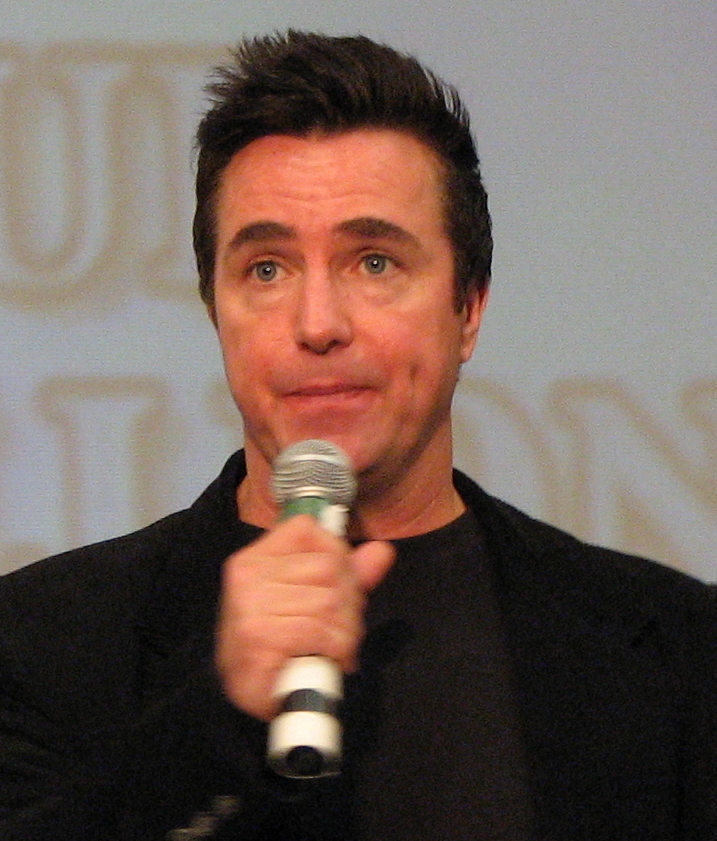
Paul McGillion plays Wexford

Terrance Wexford, played by Paul McGillion (Webisodes, recurring Season 2–3) is an Abnormal and expert on ancient artifacts. He first appeared in the sixth webisode, informing Magnus the nature of The Morrígan. His appearance was cut from "Fata Morgana" in the TV adaption. In the TV adaption, however, he is the leader of the New York Sanctuary. The Network appoints him in charge over Magnus once they learn that she kept alive "Big Bertha", apparently the most dangerous Abnormal on the Earth. He attempts to kill Big Bertha, but this only succeeds in angering her enough to cause a tsunami. In the following episode, his crew discover Wexford is so determined to kill the Abnormal he is willing to kill Magnus if she is in the way. Because of his reckless command, Magnus eventually overrules him and retakes command of the Sanctuary Network. In the next episode, because he broke several protocols, including firing at a passenger yacht, he is relieved of command from the New York Sanctuary. Paul McGillion stated that Wexford is "a lot more evil than I thought he would've been", but added "it's a really fun character to play, it's always fun playing villains". Prosthetics and contact lenses were applied to McGillion to appear as the abnormal Wexford, though he would often have trouble seeing what he was doing whilst shooting scenes. McGillion has reprised his role as Wexford in the third season, where he would be "heavily in the first two episodes".

=== Declan MacRae ===
Declan MacRae, played by Robert Lawrenson (recurring Season 2–4) is the head of the London Sanctuary, following the death of Watson. After the base falls victim to the Vampire hybrids, he occasionally assists the Old City base in their operations. In "Veritas", he takes temporary charge of the Sanctuary while Magnus is charged with murdering Bigfoot, until it is revealed Magnus did this to stop a member of the telepathic "Triad" whom she suspected for several years. In Firewall, he along with Kate, Helen, Henry and Will captured a deadly Abnormal in Old City. In season 4, he leads a search party into the ruins of Praxtus, the underground city, to find Helen Magnus. He and a committee name Will Zimmerman Head of the global Sanctuary network in Magnus's absence.

=== Adam Worth ===
Adam Worth, played by Ian Tracey (recurring Season 3–4) is a former acquaintance of The Five, who wanted to become one of them but was continually denied. Adam has a Jekyll and Hyde-type personality disorder, with Adam's calm and peaceful persona alternating against the opposite characteristics of Hyde. The split occurred after his beloved daughter died of a disease he felt Magnus should have tried harder to cure, leading to his long-standing enmity. The Five were charged with hunting him down and killing him due to his murderous tendencies. Magnus shot him at the top of a cliff and he plummeted to the river below, but he did not die. Instead, he ended up in Praxis, which he nearly managed to destroy with his experiments in time dilation. He later used those experiments to capture and irradiate Magnus as part of a plot to get back to Praxis. When his initial attempt was thwarted, he manipulated hordes of disaffected subterranean Abnormals into providing a distraction while he finished work on his time machine, which successfully opened a portal to 1898. In the following episode titled "Tempus" Magnus kills Adam with an advanced weapon shortly after he fails to save his daughters life.

=== Two Faced Guy ===
Two Faced Guy, played by Chuck Campbell (minor recurring Season 1–3) is an abnormal who appears normal from front on, but has a second face on the back of his head, the back headed face (played by Brad Proctor) being more abnormal looking. He is the most human of the abnormals, and unlike the others, he has freedom of the sanctuary. He is sometimes seen helping with minor tasks, and is shown drinking with Big Guy in season three, discussing somewhat derisively how the human team members talk about their missions.
