= Out of Mind: The Stories of H. P. Lovecraft =

- DVD cover
- Written by: Raymond Saint-Jean; H. P. Lovecraft
- Directed by: Raymond Saint-Jean
- Starring: Christopher Heyerdahl; Peter Farbridge; Art Kitching; Michael Sinelnikoff
- Country of origin: United States
- Original language: English

Production
- Running time: 56 minutes

Original release
- Release: 1998

Out of Mind: The Stories of H. P. Lovecraft is a 1998 television film based on the writings of H. P. Lovecraft and starring Christopher Heyerdahl as H. P. Lovecraft.

== Overview ==
Haunted by dark dreams of an inherited book, the Necronomicon, a young man becomes intrigued by the writings of H. P. Lovecraft.
