= A.R.C.H.I.E. =

- Film poster
- Directed by: Robin Dunne
- Written by: Robin Dunne
- Produced by: Shayne Putzlocher; Glenn Paradis; Sara Shaak
- Starring: Michael J. Fox
- Release date: April 19, 2016 (DVD)
- Countries: United States; Canada
- Language: English

A.R.C.H.I.E. is a 2016 American-Canadian science fiction film written and directed by and starring Robin Dunne and featuring the voice of Michael J. Fox. It is Dunne's feature directorial debut.

== Plot ==
Roboticist Brooke Benton creates a dog, Archie, that can talk and has super speed, strength, and X-ray vision. Upon learning the military is shutting down the program, she releases the robot dog into the wild, hoping it will help a family in need. Archie ventures into the town of Deanewood and befriends Isabel, a lonely girl who lives with her uncle and town mayor, Paul. Isabel and Archie form a close bond and help Paul retain his mayorship and run his hamburger restaurant.

== Cast ==
- Michael J. Fox as A.R.C.H.I.E. (voice)
- Katharine Isabelle as Brooke Benton
- Robin Dunne as Paul
- Sarah Desjardins as Isabel Sullivan
- Fred Ewanuick as Hugh

== Reception ==
SciFiPulse.net reviewed the film, writing that "Overall. A.R.C.H.I.E. is a fun ride that kids of all ages including grown-up ones like me will enjoy. The writing is solid in creating a fun world and sympathetic and relatable characters." The Dove Foundation gave A.R.C.H.I.E a seal of approval.

== Sequel ==
The film spawned a sequel released in 2018 titled A.R.C.H.I.E. 2: Mission Impawsible. The sequel received reviews from Dove and Common Sense Media.
