= Michael Sinelnikoff =

British actor (1928–2024)

- Born: 1 August 1928; Marylebone, London, England
- Died: 1 July 2024 (aged 95); Montreal, Quebec, Canada
- Occupation: Actor
- Years active: 1985–2024

Michael G. Sinelnikoff (1 August 1928 – 1 July 2024) was a British actor. He is known for his role as Professor Arthur Summerlee on the television series Sir Arthur Conan Doyle's The Lost World, and has been seen in a variety of film roles such as 300 and The Greatest Game Ever Played.

== Biography ==
Sinelnikoff was born in London, England, and was of mixed Russian, French, and German descent. He graduated from Higher Schools Certificate in Modern Languages, with Distinction in French and German language and literature in 1950. Sinelnikoff later attended the Royal Academy Of Dramatic Art in London; Italia Conti Stage School, London, UK; and Carleton College (University), Ottawa, Canada.

Sinelnikoff's acting credits include portraying Professor Summerlee in two separate adaptations of Sir Arthur Conan Doyle's novel The Lost World.

In 1984, Sinelnikoff became the first Director of Quebec's International Cirque du Soleil. His other non-acting credits include producing and directing 68 television dramas for CBC Montreal's Teleplay series and writer for CBC television series Festival drama: "The Spirit of the Deed". He has also served as a director at national theaters and festivals including Montreal's Centaur Theatre and Saidye Bronfman Theatre, and The Piggery Theatre in North Hatley, Quebec.

Sinelnikoff died in Montreal on 1 July 2024, at the age of 95.

== Filmography ==
=== Film ===
| Year | Title | Role | Notes |
|---|---|---|---|
| 1985 | The Blue Man | William Duval | |
| 1988 | Criminal Law | Prof. Clemens | |
| 1989 | Mindfield | Judge | |
| 1990 | Cursed | Dr. R. Roberts | |
| 1991 | L'empire des lumières | | Short film |
| 1991 | If Looks Could Kill | Haywood | |
| 1991 | The Quarrel | Hospital Patient | |
| 1994 | My Friend Max | Professeur du Conservatoire | |
| 1994 | Operation Golden Phoenix | Curator | |
| 1995 | Voices | Sir Charles Devlin | |
| 1998 | The Lost World | Professor Summerlee | |
| 1999 | Time at the Top | Mr. Reynolds | |
| 1999 | Promise Her Anything | Jeremiah Putter | |
| 2003 | Chasing Holden | Dean Dewitt | |
| 2005 | The Greatest Game Ever Played | Lord Bullock | |
| 2006 | 300 | Elder Councilman | |
| 2007 | Driver's Test | Furious Man | Short film |
| 2009 | The Velveteen Rabbit | Butler / Henry | |

=== Television ===
| Year | Title | Role | Notes |
|---|---|---|---|
| 1986 | Spearfield's Daughter | Dr. Hynd | TV miniseries |
| 1986 | Choices | Jonathan | TV film |
| 1986 | Barnum | Lord in Waiting | TV film |
| 1986 | C.A.T. Squad | Sir Cyril Sharpe | TV film |
| 1987 | Midnight Magic | Dr. Rodes | TV film |
| 1988 | Shades of Love: Tangerine Taxi | Bookish Man | TV film |
| 1989 | Day One | Lord Rutherford | TV film |
| 1991 | The Final Heist | Mark Thomas | TV film |
| 1994 | TekLords | Judge | TV film |
| 1998 | Out of Mind: The Stories of H. P. Lovecraft | Henry Armitage | TV film |
| 1999–2001 | The Lost World | Professor Arthur Summerlee | Main role (22 episodes); Guest role, episode "Man of Vision" |
| 2002 | Silent Night | Old Fritz Vincken | TV film |
| 2004 | 11 Somerset | Prof. Ramsey | "Blood Red Sky" |
| 2004–2006 | Naked Josh | Prof. Boronofsky | Recurring role |
| 2006 | Bethune | Dr. Martin | TV miniseries |
| 2009 | Ring of Deceit | Landlord | TV film |
| 2009 | The Foundation | Randolph James Selkirk | Recurring role |
| 2015 | The Art of More | Avery Swift | "Whodunnit" |
