= Robert Lawrenson =

British actor (born 1971)

- Born: 12 November 1971 (age 54); Blackpool, Lancashire, England, UK
- Occupation: Actor
- Years active: 2002–present

Robert Lawrenson (born 12 November 1971) is a British actor known for his role of Declan MacRae on the SyFy show Sanctuary. Appearances include Coronation Street and Smallville. He also works as a film editor and director.

== Filmography ==
Year	Film	Role	Notes
2002	Coronation Street	P.C. Glaister	Television series, 1 episode
2002	Crossroads	DC Parkford	Television series, 1 episode
2002	Always and Everyone	Elliott	Television series, 1 episode
2002	Holby City	Ian Kirby	Television series, 1 episode
2002	Heartbeat	Mickey Box-Cockford	Television series, 1 episode
2003	Coronation Street	P.C. Glaister	Television series, 1 episode
2003	Heartbeat	Tom Watkins	Television series, 1 episode
2003	Emmerdale	Keith Dobbs	Television series, 2 episodes
2003	Where the Heart Is	Vicar	Television series, 1 episode
2004	Coronation Street	P.C. Glaister	Television series, 2 episodes
2004	Emmerdale	Keith Dobbs	Television series, 1 episode
2005	Coronation Street	Police Officer	Television series, 1 episode
2005	Fat Friends	Leo	Television series, 1 episode
2005	Where the Heart Is	Vicar	Television series, 1 episode
2006	Coronation Street	Police Officer	Television series, 2 episodes
2006	The Royal	Tony Salter	Television series, 1 episode
2006	Doctors	Dave Gilmore	Television series, 1 episode
2007	Coronation Street	Police Officer	Television series, 3 episodes
2008	Smallville	Neurologist	Television series, 1 episode
2009	Sanctuary	Declan MacRae	Television series, 3 episodes
2009	Beyond Sherwood Forest	William	TV movie
2010	Sanctuary	Declan MacRae	Television series, 4 episodes
2010	Human Target	Prince Walter	Television series, 1 episode
2011	Sanctuary	Declan MacRae	Television series, 6 episodes
2012	Underworld: Awakening	Waterfront Cop	Film
2012	Primeval: New World	Kieran	Television series, guest role
2012	Assassin's Creed III	John Pitcairn	Video game
2013	Garage Sale Mystery	Englishman	Film
2017	FIFA 18	Andrew Butler	Video game
