= Christopher Heyerdahl =

Canadian actor (born 1963)

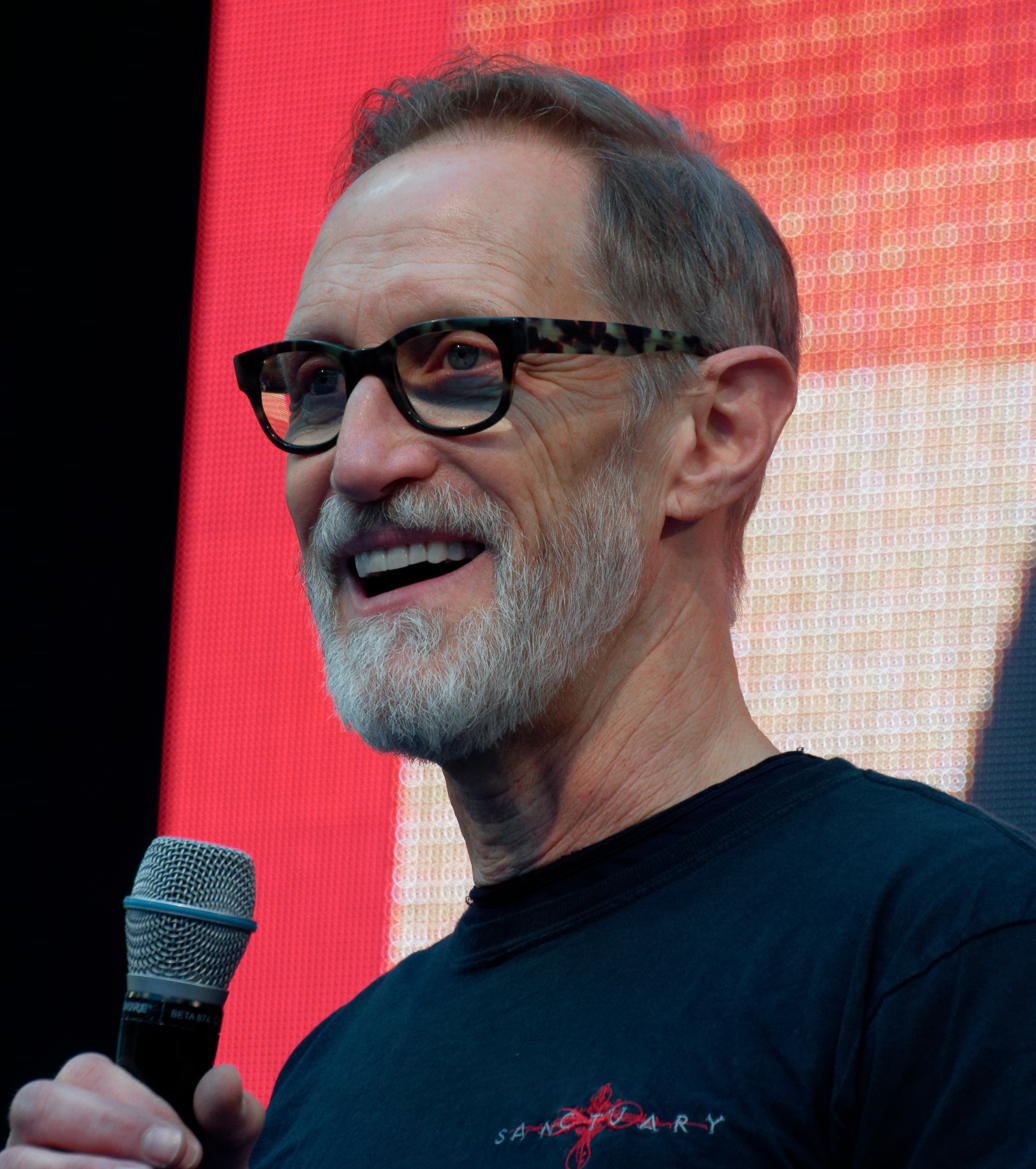
- Heyerdahl at Comicon Stuttgart, Germany – Nov. 2024
- Born: September 18, 1963 (age 62); British Columbia, Canada
- Education: Studio 58
- Occupation: Actor
- Years active: 1987–present
- Relatives: Thor Heyerdahl (first cousin once removed)

Christopher Heyerdahl (born September 18, 1963) is a Canadian actor who portrayed Alastair in Supernatural, the Wraith Todd and the Athosian Halling in Stargate Atlantis, Sam in Van Helsing, "Swede" in Hell on Wheels, Bigfoot and John Druitt in Sanctuary, and Marcus in The Twilight Saga.

== Early life ==
Heyerdahl was born in British Columbia and is of Norwegian and Scottish descent. His father emigrated from Norway to Canada in the 1950s. Thor Heyerdahl was his father's cousin. Heyerdahl also speaks Norwegian and French and studied at the University of Oslo.

== Career ==
Heyerdahl is primarily known for his recurring role as the enigmatic and sinister "Swede" in AMC's Hell on Wheels. This post-American Civil War drama debuted as the second highest rated original series in AMC history. He is also known for his role as Leonid in the Are You Afraid of the Dark? episode "The Thirteenth Floor" and as Nosferatu in the episode "Midnight Madness". He played the characters Halling and Wraith commander Todd in Stargate Atlantis, and Pallan in the Stargate SG-1 episode "Revisions". He played H. P. Lovecraft in the film Out of Mind: The Stories of H. P. Lovecraft (1998) and a punk, new at drug dealing, in Cadavres (2009).

He played the part of the demon Alastair in three episodes of Supernatural. He also played the part of Zor-El in the television series Smallville, as well as playing John Druitt and Bigfoot in the series Sanctuary. He played the part of Dieter Braun on True Blood during the show's 5th season.

His most notable film role was in the feature film New Moon, an adaptation of Stephenie Meyer's second book in her Twilight Saga. In this film, he played a vampire, Marcus, who is part of a powerful Italian family called the Volturi. He reprised that role in both parts of Breaking Dawn, the two-part adaptation of the fourth book in the Twilight Saga.

He has also performed on stage and was a member of the Young Company at the Stratford Festival in 1989 and 1990.

In 2015, Heyerdahl hosted the Leo Awards gala ceremony.

In 2022, Heyerdahl starred in the true crime drama miniseries Under the Banner of Heaven. In 2024 it was announced that he would be starring the upcoming Crave crime drama Underbelly.

== Credits ==
=== Film ===
Year	Title	Role	Notes
1994	Highlander III: The Sorcerer	'Ponytail'	
1994	Warrior	Milo	
1996	Coyote Run	Judd Lush	Credited as Chris Heyerdahl
1996	Silent Trigger	O'Hara	
1996	Rowing Through	Paul Enquist	TV film
1997	Twists of Terror	Darien	TV film
1997	The Education of Little Tree	Billy 'Pine Billy'	
1997	The Peacekeeper	Hettinger	
1997	Affliction	Frankie Lacoy	Credited as Chris Heyerdahl
1997	Bleeders	Narrator	
1997	Habitat	Eric Thornton	Credited as Chris Heyerdahl
1997	The Call of the Wild: Dog of the Yukon	Fellow Gambler #2	
1998	The Ghosts of Dickens' Past	Charles Dickens	
1998	Out of Mind: The Stories of H. P. Lovecraft	Howard P. Lovecraft	TV film
1999	Babel	Preficator	Credited as Chris Heyerdahl
1999	Requiem for Murder	Detective Lou Heinz	
1999	Fish Out of Water	Bobby Fish	
1999	2 frères	Bobby Vieira	
2000	Nuremberg	Ernst Kaltenbrunner	TV film
2000	Believe	Thad Stiles	
2000	Press Run	Mickey Collins	
2000	Nowhere in Sight	Lewis Gills	
2001	The Pig's Law (La Loi du cochon)	Jodorowsky, Junkie	
2001	Varian's War	Marius Franken	TV film
2002	Matthew Blackheart: Monster Smasher	Dr. Jacob Mortas	TV film
2002	Aftermath	Evan Harper	
2002	India: Kingdom of the Tiger	Jim Corbett	
2004	Blade: Trinity	Caulder	
2004	Catwoman	Rocker	
2004	The Chronicles of Riddick	Helion Politico	
2004	The Last Tunnel (Le Dernier tunnel)	Smiley	
2005	Kamataki	Scott	
2005	The Outlander (Le Survenant)	Mike l'Irlandais	
2007	The Invisible	Dr. Woland	
2009	The Twilight Saga: New Moon	Marcus Volturi	
2009	Cadavres	Paolo	
2011	The Twilight Saga: Breaking Dawn – Part 1	Marcus Volturi	
2012	The Twilight Saga: Breaking Dawn – Part 2	Marcus Volturi	
2013	Three Days in Havana	Anders	
2014	The Calling	Simon	
2015	Eadweard	'Pepper'	Won–Leo Award for Best Supporting Performance by a Male
2016	Honeyglue	Dennis	
2018	Sicario: Day of the Soldado	Headmaster Deats	
2018	Stockholm	Chief Mattsson	
2019	Adopt a Highway	Jim	
2019	Togo	George Maynard	
2022	Viking	Roy Walker	
2022	Corner Office	Andrew	
2023	The Boy in the Woods	Bagan	
2025	The Train (Le Train)		

=== Television ===
Year	Title	Role	Notes
1987	21 Jump Street	Jake	Episode: "Next Generation"
1993	Are You Afraid of the Dark?	Leonid / Nosferatu	2 episodes
1994	The Maharaja's Daughter	Walt	TV miniseries
1997	The Hunger	Arthur	Episode: "A Matter of Style"
1999	Lassie	Alfred Kraus	Episode: "The Manhunt"
2000	La Femme Nikita	Colin Starnes	Episode: "Sleeping with the Enemy"
2000	The Secret Adventures of Jules Verne	D'Artagnan	2 episodes
2002	Just Cause	Dr. Tolkien	Episode: "Human Trials"
2002	Napoléon	Étienne Geoffroy Saint-Hilaire	
2002–2003	John Doe	Dr. Hillman	2 episodes
2003	Jeremiah	Paul Wiel	Episode:
2003	Les Aventures tumultueuses de Jack Carter	Lennie	2 episodes
2003	Stargate SG-1	Pallan	Episode: "Revisions"
2003	Andromeda	Gaiton	Episode: "Deep Midnight's Voice"
2004	Life As We Know It	Mr. Mitchell	Episode: "Pilot"
2004	Kingdom Hospital	Reverend Jimmy Criss	3 episodes
2004–2009	Stargate: Atlantis	Todd / Halling / Male Wraith	22 episodes
2005	Into the West	Jim Ebbets	Episode: "Manifest Destiny"
2006	Le 7e round	Arthur Kennedy	TV mini-series
2006	Whistler	Justin Talbert	Episode: "The Looks of Love"
2006	Psych	'Long Hair'	Episode: "Pilot"
2006	The Dead Zone	Zed	Episode: "Panic"
2006	Saved	John The Baptist	Episode: "A Day in the Life"
2006	The Collector	Jan Van Der Heyden	Episode: "The Alchemist"; Won–Leo Award for Best Guest Performance by a Male in a Dramatic Series
2007	Smallville	Zor-El	2 episodes
2007	Les Sœurs Elliot	Alcidez Barling	
2007	Masters of Horror	Rufus Griswold	Episode: "The Black Cat"
2007	Killer Wave	Stanley Schiff	TV mini-series
2007–2009	Sanctuary	John Druitt and Bigfoot	10 episodes Won–Leo Award for Best Supporting Performance by a Male in a Dramatic Series
2009	Supernatural	Alastair	3 episodes
2010	Caprica	Kevin Reikle	
2011–2016	Hell on Wheels	Thor 'The Swede' Gundersen	39 episodes Won–ACTRA Montreal Award for Outstanding Performance – Male (2013); Nominated–Leo Award for Best Supporting Performance by a Male in a Dramatic Series (2015); Nominated–Golden Maple Award for Newcomer of the year in a TV series broadcast in the U.S. (2016); Nominated–Golden Maple Award for Best Actor in a TV series broadcast in the U.S. (2016); Nominated–Leo Award for Best Lead Performance by a Male in a Dramatic Series (2017)
2011	R. L. Stine's The Haunting Hour: The Series	Fear (credited as "Collector")	Episode: "Fear Never Knocks"; Won–Leo Award for Best Performance in a Youth or Children's Program or Series
2012	True Blood	Dieter Braun	Recurring role
2013	Vegas	Calvin	Episode: "Unfinished Business"
2013	Falling Skies	Duane Pickett	Episode: "The Pickett Line"
2013	Castle	Henri	Episode: "Hunt"
2013	CSI: Crime Scene Investigation	Marc Ratelle	Episode: "In Vino Veritas"
2013	Nikita	Matthew Collins	Episode: "Broken Home"
2014	Beauty & the Beast	Dr. Nicholas Markus	Episode: "Redemption"
2014	Rush	Martin Arisson	Episode: "Learning to Fly"
2015	Gotham	Jack Buchinsky / Electrocutioner	Recurring role
2015	Dig	Olaf	Pilot episode
2015	Minority Report	Dr. Lionel Gray	Recurring role 3 episodes
2015	Arrow	Damien Darhk's Assistant	Episode: "My Name Is Oliver Queen"
2016	12 Monkeys	The Keeper	Episode: "Hyena"
2016	Scorpion	President Korsovich	Episode: "Rock Block"
2016–2021	Van Helsing	Sam	Recurring role; credited for flashback appearance in 2021; Nominated–Leo Award for Best Lead Performance by a Male in a Dramatic Series (2017)
2017	Midnight, Texas	Hightower	Episode: "Unearthed"
2017	The Librarians	Grigori Rasputin	Episode: "And the Graves of Time"
2017–2018	Damnation	Don Berryman	Main role 10 episodes
2017–2020	Tin Star	Louis Gagnon	Recurring role 9 episodes
2018	Travelers	Andrew Matthias Graham	Episode: "Archive"
2018-2019	Deadly Class	Master Zane	Recurring role 2 episodes
2019	Pure	Augustus Nickel	Recurring role 6 episodes (season 2)
2020	Messiah	Oscar Wallace	Episode: "God is Greater"
2020	Psych 2: Lassie Come Home	Ova	TV movie
2020	Star Trek: Discovery	Wen	Episode: "People of Earth"
2021	Them	Black Hat Man	Recurring role
2021	Chapelwaite	Jakub	Recurring main role (Note: Credited alongside main cast in opening-titles of each episode where appeared, unlike other recurring, guest or co-starring cast.); 5 episodes
2022	Peacemaker	Captain Caspar Locke	Recurring role 4 episodes
2022	Under The Banner Of Heaven	Ammon Lafferty	Main role, miniseries
2023	The Last of Us	Dr. Schoenheiss	Episode: "When You're Lost in the Darkness"
2023–2024	Monarch: Legacy of Monsters	General Puckett	5 episodes
2025	Dark Winds	Doctor Renolds	Season 3 Episode 2
2026	The Vampire Lestat	Marius de Romanus	Episode: "New York"
2026	The Borderline	Charlie Penner	

=== Video games ===
Year	Title	Role
2017	Wolfenstein II: The New Colossus	Horton Boone
2018	Far Cry 5	Sheriff Earl Whitehorse
2022	Assassin's Creed Valhalla: Dawn of Ragnarök	Surtr
