= Robin Dunne =

Canadian actor

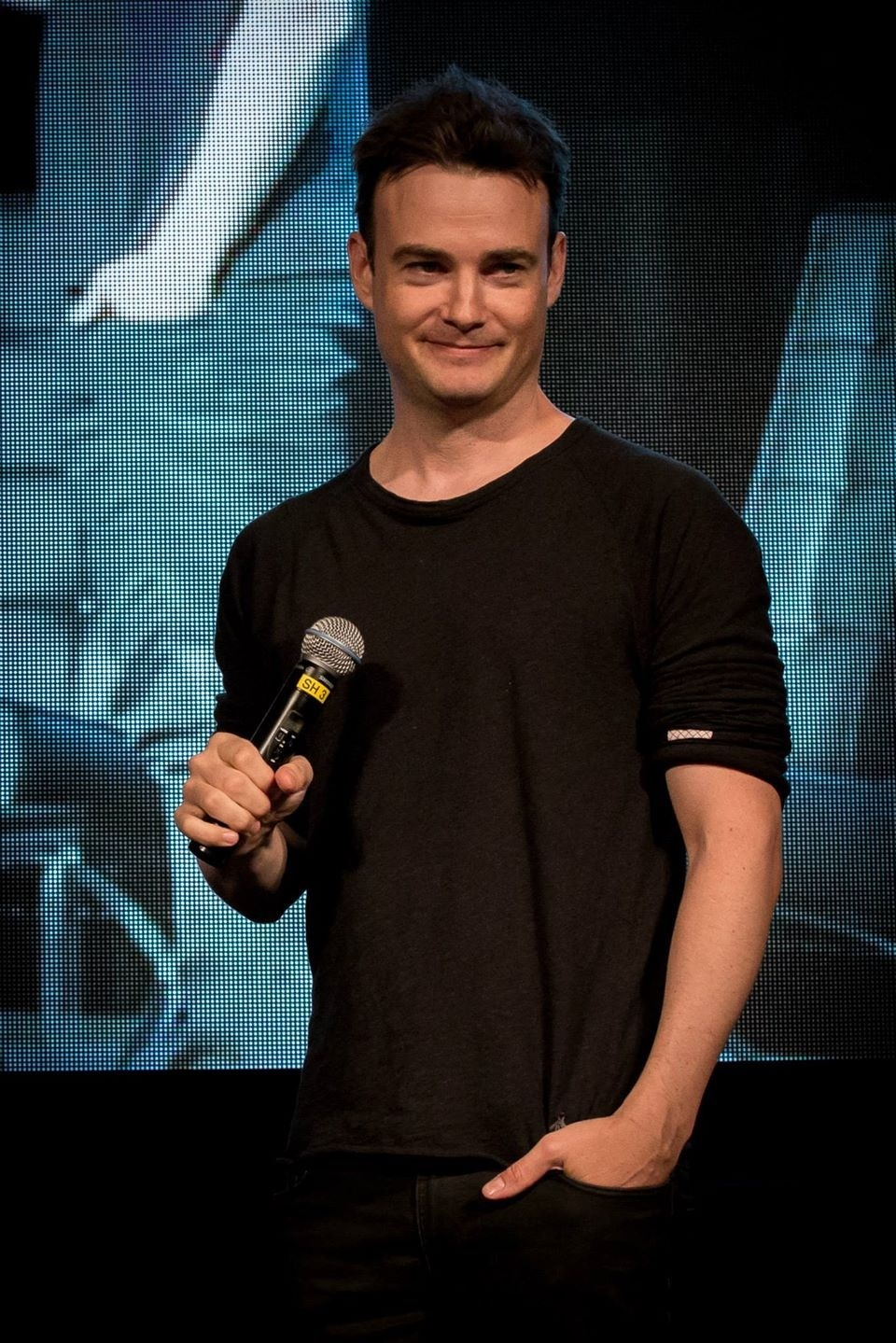
- Dunne in 2014
- Born: November 19, 1976 (age 49)
- Occupations: Actor; writer; producer; director
- Years active: 1994–present
- Spouse(s): Heidi Lenhart (m. 2002; div. 2005) Farrah Aviva (m. 2016)
- Children: 1

Robin Dunne (born November 19, 1976) is a Canadian actor who has had numerous leading roles in sequels throughout his career, but is perhaps best known for his role as Doctor Will Zimmerman in the science fiction television series Sanctuary.

== Personal life ==
Dunne attended the Etobicoke School of the Arts in Toronto, Ontario. Robin Dunne's mother is a native of Dublin in the Republic of Ireland.

He was married to actress Heidi Lenhart, but divorced under pressures of living in Hollywood.

In 2016, he married co-star Farrah Aviva on the sets of their movie Welcome to Nowhere. In March 2021 the couple welcomed their first child, a daughter.

== Career ==
One of Dunne's earliest starring roles was as Franz Bhaer in the television series Little Men from 1998 to 1999. He also starred in UPN's short-lived As If as well as recurring guest roles on Dawson's Creek and Dead Like Me. Dunne has also appeared in NCIS.

His most notable movie role was the character Sebastian Valmont in Cruel Intentions 2. He has also appeared in The Skulls II, American Psycho 2 and Just Friends. Additionally, Dunne appeared in the made-for-television films Jewel, Au Pair II, Roughing It, Species III and Code Breakers. Dunne also portrayed Robin Hood in the television film Beyond Sherwood Forest, directed by Peter DeLuise, starring alongside Erica Durance.

Beginning in 2007, Dunne co-starred with Amanda Tapping in the science fiction/fantasy series Sanctuary which premiered as a series of eight webisodes before being commissioned as a conventional television series by Syfy in the United States. The series was broadcast on many international free-to-air and cable networks. For this role, he was nominated for a Leo Award in the Best Lead Performance by a Male in a Dramatic Series category and won in 2010.

On May 6, 2013, Dunne appeared in an episode of Defiance as Miko. He returned to the show in 2014 in a recurring role as Mordecai, an Irathient lawyer and apparent reincarnation of an ancient astronaut of the same species.

In addition to his acting career, Dunne has also co-written the Roxy Hunter franchise for Nickelodeon. The first two films, Roxy Hunter and the Mystery of the Moody Ghost and Roxy Hunter and the Secret of the Shaman, were shot in 2005. These films spawned a successful franchise that has led to his co-writing the third and fourth installments in the series Roxy Hunter and the Myth of the Mermaid and Roxy Hunter and the Horrific Halloween. He has also co-authored the novels for Penguin Books.

== Filmography ==
=== Film ===
Year	Title	Role	Notes
1995	Jungleground	Pretty Boy	
1998	The Big Hit	Gump	
1998	The Hairy Bird	Todd Winslow	
1998	The Fence	Tomas	
1999	Teenage Space Vampires	Bill Swenson	
2000	Cruel Intentions 2	Sebastian Valmont	Direct to video
2002	The Skulls II	Ryan Sommers	Direct to video
2002	American Psycho 2	Brian Leads	Direct to video
2002	The Fraternity	Alex Desineau	
2003	The Snow Walker	Carl	
2004	Species III	Dean	
2005	Just Friends	Ray	
2008	Jack and Jill vs. the World	Gary / Ignatius the Philosophical Clown	Also co-producer
2011	Shape		Short film / Writer and producer
2012	Space Milkshake	Jimmy	Also producer
2013	Three Days in Havana	Benny	
2013	Torment	Cory Morgan	
2013	Supercollider	Victor Susskind	
2015	Deadfall	The Man	Short film
2016	A.R.C.H.I.E.	Paul	Direct to video
2016	The Adventure Club	Martin	
2018	Altered Skin	Craig	Pakistani film
2025	Savvy Sheldon Feels Good As Hell	Ryan	Television film

=== Television ===
Year	Title	Role	Notes
1994	Against Their Will: Women in Prison	Scott	Television film
1994	Side Effects	Mark Edwards	Episode: "Superman"
1995	Road to Avonlea	Rich Boy #1	Episode: "Christmas in June"
1995	Love and Betrayal: The Mia Farrow Story	Fletcher #3	Television film
1995	My Life as a Dog	Kris Johansson	Episode: "Tribe"
1995	Brothers' Destiny	Clay Berry	Television film
1995	Side Effects	Matthew Barkin	4 episodes
1996	A Husband, a Wife and a Lover	Bruce	Television film
1996	Kung Fu: The Legend Continues	Rick	Episode: "Dragon's Lair"
1996	The Adventures of Sinbad	Prince Casib	2 episodes
1996	Ready or Not	Gregory	Episode: "What's Yours Is Mine"
1997	Psi Factor: Chronicles of the Paranormal	Darren	Episode: "The Undead / The Stalker"
1997	The Adventures of Shirley Holmes	Alan Brooks	Episode: "The Case of the Alien Abductions"
1998	The Mystery Files of Shelby Woo	Blade	Episode: "The Art Attack Mystery"
1998	Mythic Warriors: Guardians of the Legend	Perseus / Villager #2 (voice)	2 episodes
1998–1999	Little Men	Franz Bhaer	16 episodes
1999–2000	Dawson's Creek	A.J. Moller	4 episodes
2000	Trapped in a Purple Haze	Brian Hanson	Television film
2001	The Wandering Soul Murders	Eric Matthews	Television film
2001	A Colder Kind of Death	Eric Matthews	Television film
2001	Jewel	Wilman Hilburn (ages 18–26)	Television film
2001	Borderline Normal	Jeremy Walling	Television film
2001	Au Pair II	Michael Hausen	Television film
2001	Class Warfare	Richard Ashbury	Television film
2002	As If	Alex	Main cast
2002	Roughing It	Young Samuel Clemens	Television film
2003	Hemingway vs. Callaghan	Young Callaghan	Television film
2004	Dead Like Me	Thomas 'Trip' Hesberg III	2 episodes
2004	Species III	Dean	Television film
2005	Code Breakers	Trager	Television film
2006	CSI: Miami	Hayden Cruise	Episode: "Driven"
2007	NCIS	Army Lt. Joseph Marsden	Episode: "Ex-File"
2007	Roxy Hunter and the Mystery of the Moody Ghost		Television film / Writer
2007	The Dark Room	Philip Russell	Television film
2008	Roxy Hunter and the Secret of the Shaman		Television film / Writer
2008	Roxy Hunter and the Myth of the Mermaid		Television film / Story and screenplay
2008–2011	Sanctuary	Dr. Will Zimmerman / Jack Zimmerman (1 episode)	Main cast / 58 episodes / Also director (Episode: "Homecoming")
2008	Roxy Hunter and the Horrific Halloween		Television film / Story and screenplay
2009	Beyond Sherwood Forest	Robin Hood	Television film
2013–2014	Defiance	Miko/Cai	5 episodes
2013	Scarecrow	Aaron Harris	Television film
2013	The Good Witch's Destiny	Drew	Hallmark Channel Television film
2013	The Twelve Trees of Christmas	Tony Shaughnessy	Television film
2015	Real Murders: An Aurora Teagarden Mystery	Robin Daniels	Hallmark Movies & Mysteries Television film
2015	Asteroid: Final Impact	Bill	Television film
2015	On the Twelfth Day of Christmas	Mitch O'Grady	Hallmark Channel Television film
2016	Sound of Christmas	Brad Evans	Hallmark Channel Television film
2016	Inhuman Condition	Graham	Web Series
2017	Murdoch Mysteries	Franklin Williams	2 episodes: "Hell to Pay", "Up From Ashes"
2018	Last Scene Alive: An Aurora Teagarden Mystery	Robin Daniels	Hallmark Movies & Mysteries Television film
2019	The Christmas Chalet	Jack	Television Film
2019	New Year's Kiss		
2020	Hudson & Rex		1 episode
Television Film
2020	October Faction	Woody Markham	Netflix series
2021	Love's Match a/k/a A Forever Match	Peter Beckett	Television Film
2021	The Enchanted Christmas Cake	Gavin	Television Film
2023	My Christmas Hero	Captain Mark Jennings	Television film
2024	Ainsley McGregor Mysteries: A Case for the Winemaker	Ryan McGregor	Television Film
2026	Bee My Love	Aaron Whitmore	Television film

=== Other ===
Title	Year	Role	Notes
Sanctuary	2007	Dr. Will Zimmerman	8 webisodes
The Jace Hall Show	2009	Himself	1 episode: "Sanctuary & Terminator: Salvation"
InnerSPACE	2012	Himself / Host	1 episode
Match Game	2012–2013	Himself / Guest Panelist	15 episodes
