= Damian Kindler =

Screenwriter

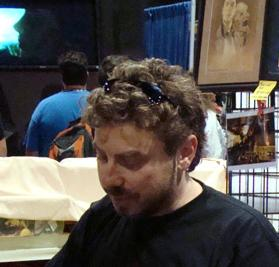
- Born: May 31, 1968 (age 58); Melbourne, Australia
- Education: Queen's University
- Occupations: Screenwriter, producer, director, showrunner
- Spouse: Jill Bodie (m. 1995)
- Children: 2
- Writing career
- Years active: 1995 – present
- Genres: Science-fiction, supernatural fiction, superhero fiction, horror, science fantasy, fantasy
- Notable work: Sanctuary

Damian Kindler (born May 31, 1968) is an Australian-Canadian screenwriter, television producer, director and showrunner. He has worked on a number of genre TV programs, including Stargate SG-1, Sleepy Hollow, Krypton, and American Gods. Kindler is best known for creating, writing, and producing the Syfy fantasy science-fiction series Sanctuary (2007-2011).

== Biography ==
Kindler was born in Melbourne, Australia. His family relocated to Rochester, NY, only a few months after his birth so that his father, a medical student, could complete his residency. The family moved to Toronto, ON in 1971.

Kindler attended Queen's University in Kingston, ON where he studied English and Film.

In 2009, Kindler and his wife, Jill Bodie, collaborated with Amanda Tapping on a children's charity foundation called Sanctuary for Kids, intending to leverage the show's cult following for a good cause. The foundation closed in 2018.

Kindler currently resides in Los Angeles. He has cited Stephen King, Sir Arthur Conan Doyle, and Aaron Sorkin as writing inspirations.

== Career ==
Kindler began his career in 1995 on Kung Fu: The Legend Continues. He then worked on MGM Television's Stargate SG-1 and Stargate: Atlantis television series. He joined the Stargate production team at the start of Stargate SG-1's sixth season, remaining part of the writing staff for five seasons.

In May 2007, Kindler launched the independent web series Sanctuary, which was then picked up for television by The Movie Network in Canada and Syfy in the United States. The show ran for four seasons with Kindler serving as showrunner. In 2021, the show was described as "painfully ahead of its time" by The Companion, and Kindler received attention for his early use of webisodes prior to streaming, as well as for Sanctuary being one of the first television series with nearly fully virtual special effects. Kindler's screenwriting and direction on Sanctuary received a total of 7 Leo Award nominations.

In 2013, Kindler was hired as an executive producer on FOX's Sleepy Hollow. He wrote and produced the show for 3 seasons.

Kindler was hired as an executive producer and showrunner of Syfy's Superman prequel Krypton, produced with David S. Goyer, DC Entertainment, and Warner Horizon Television in 2016.

On September 28, 2018, it was announced that Netflix had ordered the production of the science-fiction horror drama series October Faction, an adaption of the comic book series of the same name. He served as creator and showrunner for the series.

Kindler was hired in 2019 as a writer and executive producer for the third and final season of American Gods.

== Filmography ==
=== Television ===
Year	Title	Writer	Producer	Creator	Notes
2021	American Gods	Yes	Yes	No	2 episodes
2020	October Faction	Yes	Yes	Yes	10 episodes
2018	Krypton	Yes	Executive	Developed	
2013 – 2016	Sleepy Hollow	Yes	Executive	No	9 episodes
2007 – 2012	Sanctuary	Yes	Executive	Yes	66 episodes
2004 – 2005	Stargate: Atlantis	Yes	No	No	5 episodes
2002 – 2004	Stargate: SG-1	Yes	Yes	No	26 episodes
2002	Shadow Realm	Yes	No	No	
2002	Galidor: Defenders of the Outer Dimension	Yes	No	No	1 episode
2002	Relic Hunter	Yes	No	No	1 episode
2000	The Lost World	Yes	No	No	1 episode
2000	The Immortal	Yes	No	No	
2000	Code Name: Eternity	Yes	Yes	No	1 episode
1996-2000	PSI Factor: Chronicles of the Paranormal	Yes	No	No	17 episodes
1999	BeastMaster	Yes	No	No	
1998	Earth: The Final Conflict	Yes	No	No	1 episode
1997	F/X: The Series	Yes	No	No	1 episode
1995	Kung Fu: The Legend Continues	Yes	No	No	5 episodes
