= Sympathy (disambiguation) =

Sympathy is the perception, understanding, and reaction to the distress or need of another life form.

Sympathy may also refer to:

== Music ==
- Sympathy (band), a Canadian blackened death metal band
- Sympathy (music), a short piece of instrumental music

=== Albums ===
- Sympathy (Raphe Malik album), 2004
- sympathy (Hitomi Takahashi album), 2006
- Sympathy, a 1980 album by John Miles

=== Songs ===
- "Sympathy" (Goo Goo Dolls song), 2003
- "Sympathy" (Rare Bird song), 1970, later covered by The Family Dogg, Marillion and Toyah
- "Sympathy" (Uriah Heep song), 1976
- "Sympathy", a song by Die Monster Die from the 1994 album Withdrawal Method
- "Sympathy", a song by Sleater-Kinney from the 2002 album One Beat
- "Sympathy", a song by Billy Talent from the 2006 album Billy Talent II
- "Sympathy", a song by Vampire Weekend from the 2019 album Father of the Bride
- "Sympathy", a song by Tremonti from the 2015 album Cauterize
- "Sympathize", a song by Amos Lee from the 2006 album Supply and Demand

== Other uses ==
- "Sympathy" (poem), by Paul Laurence Dunbar, 1899
- Sympathy, a supernatural connection between a mantic event and a real circumstance prophesied in Greek divination

== See also ==
- Sympathetic (disambiguation)
- Empathy (disambiguation)
- Superficial sympathy, or crocodile tears
- Sympathy pain, symptoms of the Couvade syndrome
- Kinesthetic sympathy, an attachment to objects in hand not felt for them out of sight
- "The Power of Sympathy", a novel by William Hill Brown
