= Sanctuary season 2 =

Sanctuary
- Season 2
- DVD cover art
- Starring: Amanda Tapping; Robin Dunne; Emilie Ullerup; Ryan Robbins; Agam Darshi; Christopher Heyerdahl
- No. of episodes: 13

Release
- Original network: Syfy
- Original release: October 9, 2009 – January 15, 2010

Season chronology
- ← Previous; Season 1 Next → Season 3

The second season of the Canadian science fiction–fantasy television series Sanctuary premiered on Space in Canada and on Syfy in the United States on October 9, 2009, and concluded on the same channel on January 15, 2010 after 13 episodes. It continues to follow the actions of a secret organization known as the Sanctuary Network, who track down a series of creatures known as abnormals and then bring them to the Sanctuary base for refuge.

The season starts six weeks after the conclusion of the first season, where the protagonists work to defeat the antagonistic Cabal from destroying the Sanctuary Network, but in the process Ashley Magnus (Ullerup), daughter of Sanctuary leader Helen Magnus (Tapping), dies. Later episodes involve a story arc on Big Bertha, the most dangerous abnormal on Earth.

The second season included a writing team, where as in the first there were only two writers; series creator Damian Kindler, and Sam Egan; however Egan left the series after the end of the first season. The producers wanted to expand on the Sanctuary Network by including episodes where the team visit some of their international sites as opposed to only mentioning them. The season was filmed in Vancouver, British Columbia from late March to July 2009, with some scenes of the finale filmed on location in Tokyo, Japan. Anthem Visual Effects continues to produce the series' visual effects. Anthem found an exponential growth in their work, with some episodes including as many as 500 visual effects shots.

The first ten episodes were seen by an average of 1.55 million viewers in the United States, increasing to 2.2 million when time-shifted viewings were taken into account. It received generally positive reviews from critics; however, some reviewers criticized the abrupt end to the Cabal arc within the first few episodes. The introduction of the new character Kate Freelander (Darshi) was also met with mixed reactions, while there was an outpouring of fans against Ashley's demise. Season two won seven Leo Awards after its release. The season was released on a four-disc set on DVD and Blu-ray Disc on June 9, 2010 in Region 4, June 15 in Region 1, and October 4 in Region 2.

== Episodes ==
No. overall	No. in season	Title	Directed by	Written by	Original release date	US viewers (millions)
14	1	"End of Nights (Part 1)"	Martin Wood	Damian Kindler	October 9, 2009	1.85
Six weeks after Ashley Magnus (Emilie Ullerup) was turned by the Cabal, her mother Helen Magnus (Amanda Tapping) and father John Druitt (Christopher Heyerdahl) search for her. Ashley steals a hard drive on "Operation Montana", a secret past eugenics experiment in Montreal. Meanwhile, Nikola Tesla (Jonathon Young) develops a cure against the "Lazarus" virus, but abnormal Bigfoot (Heyerdahl) refuses to take it. When the team search for the Montana subjects, they encounter Kate Freelander (Agam Darshi), a con artist with Cabal connections. Kate is able to escape, but knowing she was captured by the Sanctuary, the Cabal order a kill squad against her. Freelander flees to the Sanctuary and tells Magnus everything she knows about the Cabal, saying she visited one of their facilities in Alberta. When they arrive there they encounter Ashley, who has been converted to a vampire-hybrid using the source blood from the lost city of Bhalasaam. They escape before she can kill them. The Cabal later copies Ashley's DNA to create five other hybrids using the Montana subjects, and declare war on the Sanctuary Network.
15	2	"End of Nights (Part 2)"	Martin Wood	Damian Kindler	October 16, 2009	1.77
Ashley and her cadre of teleporting hybrids use their powers to destroy several Sanctuary bases worldwide. Tesla and Henry Foss (Ryan Robbins) work on a weapon that can stun the hybrids. Their first trial proves unsuccessful and the hybrids destroy the London Sanctuary, as well as killing Will Zimmerman's (Robin Dunne) girlfriend Clara Griffin (Christine Chatelain). In response, Tesla upgrades the weapon to its lethal setting, allowing for an effective defense of the primary Sanctuary base. During the battle, Bigfoot is finally persuaded by Magnus to take the cure for Lazarus and help his friends. Three of the hybrids are killed by the weapon and another dies when Henry reactivates the base's electromagnetic (EM) shield, causing the hybrid to vaporize when it teleports. Magnus is able to break through to Ashley, who recognizes her just in time to save her from the last hybrid's attack. Ashley then drags the hybrid with her and teleports into the EM field.
16	3	"Eulogy"	Brenton Spencer	Sara B. Cooper	October 23, 2009	1.69
The Sanctuary is forced to house several abnormals until the other bases are rebuilt. Kate accidentally releases an offspring of a Steno, a species thought to be extinct; the creature grows quickly and escapes the Sanctuary premises to wreak havoc in the city. When the creature is found in the sewers, Kate discovers it has imprinted on her, and thinks she is its mother. Meanwhile, Druitt and Tesla take down several Cabal cells, and leader Dana Whitcomb (Lynda Boyd) is last seen on the run. Magnus believes Ashley is still alive, as the EM shield destabilized at the same time she teleported. When that theory does not pan out, she still believes Ashley's life sign may be in the EM shield buffer. After all her efforts prove fruitless, Magnus is forced to accept that Ashley is dead.
17	4	"Hero"	Martin Wood	Alan McCullough	October 30, 2009	1.61
The Sanctuary encounters a superhero called the "Adjuster" (Christopher Gauthier), who is thwarting their efforts to capture a host to a dangerous abnormal called a coleanthropus. The Sanctuary captures the Adjuster and, although he is human, his suit is made of abnormal insects which grant him super powers via telepathy. However, the suit is gradually killing the wearer, claims adjuster Walter, and cannot be removed. The team also deals with the coleanthropus that is now loose in the city. Walter is able to defeat it, and his suit is finally removed after he wishes it off. Meanwhile, Kate deals with her brother's debt to Constantine (Timothy Paul Perez), a shady figure from Kate's past who traffics in abnormals. She learns that his gang used her brother to get to her, in order to gain access to the Sanctuary. Kate thwarts their plan and apparently earns the trust of Magnus, who invites her into a "more permanent" room. Months later, the team learn Walter is producing a successful comic book series based on his experiences, and has already sold the film rights.
18	5	"Pavor Nocturnus"	Brenton Spencer	Damian Kindler & James Thorpe	November 6, 2009	1.42
Magnus awakens in the ruined Sanctuary and is attacked by brutally savage humanoid creatures while venturing the city streets, but she is saved by a survivalist group led by Will. After decontamination, she is interrogated by Will who claims she died three years before. She learns that a plague has turned all but a hundred thousand or so of the human population into the creatures. Eventually, Will and Magnus work together to learn the truth from Magnus' video files, but Will is infected and sacrifices himself to buy her time. Magnus realizes that during a mission in Honduras, she found a vial which contained a "cure" for her longevity, but by taking it she also inadvertently released the plague that previously destroyed the Maya civilization. Before she can die at the hands of the creatures, she is transported back in time to the moment she found the vial, which is guarded by an incorporeal abnormal; the creature had apparently transported her 10 years into an alternate future to show her the potential consequences of her actions. She leaves the vial where she found it and returns to the Sanctuary empty handed.
19	6	"Fragments"	Steven A. Adelson	Sara B. Cooper	November 13, 2009	1.66
One of the Sanctuary's research scientists, Rachel (Anne Marie Loder) is viciously attacked by Jack, a docile abnormal that was taught to communicate with sign language. Magnus learns that Jack implanted Rachel with spores, meaning that it would be difficult to save her. Henry investigates the origin of Jack's uncharacteristic behavior and eventually realizes that her husband Gerald (Colin Cunningham) poisoned his food in an attempt to kill Henry; Gerald blames him for his failing marriage, as Henry and Rachel developed feelings for each other. He tries to force Henry to turn into his werewolf form, but Henry regains control of himself. In the end, Jack is cured and Magnus saves Rachel, who Henry decides to let go.
20	7	"Veritas"	Amanda Tapping	Alan McCullough	November 20, 2009	1.44
Magnus is charged with murdering Bigfoot, and London Sanctuary head Declan McRae (Robert Lawrenson) takes charge. Will's efforts in clearing Magnus only incriminates her further. A trio of telepaths known as the "Triad", headed by Emma (Erica Cerra), to understand her, but they fail to read her mind as Magnus has lost her mental stability. Will later discovers that Magnus may have kept alive "Big Bertha", apparently the most dangerous abnormal on Earth Magnus was thought to have killed. He also discovers that Emma believes she is alive and tries to find her, but Will and Kate are able to fool her into capturing a decoy, and they convince her Big Bertha really is dead. In the end it is revealed Bigfoot faked his death as his skin was thick enough to stop a bullet with a venom to feign the signs of death. Magnus reveals that she designed this deception to catch Emma, whom she suspected for several years, and rendered herself immune to the Triad by attaching an Ozone Beetle to her brain to mimic her instability.
21	8	"Next Tuesday"	Martin Wood	Damian Kindler	December 4, 2009	1.33
Will and Magnus' helicopter crashes on a decommissioned oil platform in the Gulf of Mexico while they are transporting a rare vampire squid. Not only does the squid escape during the crash, it continues to attack them afterwards, which is unlike the abnormal's typical behaviour. It is later revealed the vampire squid is actually attacking a sea scorpion, the squid's natural enemy, which stowed away on the helicopter and caused the damage that led to the crash. Magnus decides to let the squid win; she and Will destroy the helicopter wreckage so the scorpion will fall into the water where it cannot defend itself against the squid. Once the scorpion is defeated, the squid becomes peaceful again, while the smoke from the explosion would become a rescue signal.
22	9	"Penance"	Brenton Spencer	Alan McCullough	December 11, 2009	1.36
A meeting between Magnus and former gang member and friend Jimmy (Michael Shanks), who tries to hand over a fire elemental from his abdominal pouch, is interrupted by an underground mob Jimmy stole the abnormal from. The leader is diacon (Alecs Paunovic), an easily angered type of abnormal, whose rage is suppressed by a device that affects his neurology. Kate drives Jimmy to safety, but Kate is wounded and Jimmy takes her into hiding. Kate learns that Jimmy's past is very similar to her own. However, a further conversation reveals that Jimmy was the one who murdered Kate's father twenty years before. Henry learns the gang have infiltrated their communication system, hampering their search efforts. Will is later captured. To secure his release, Magnus tricks the diacon into thinking that she has delivered Jimmy in return. When the boss discovers the illusion he resumes the pursuit, only to find Jimmy turning himself in to the mobsters; he detonates C4 from his pouch once they have him, killing the mobsters and himself, absolving himself from the guilt of his past actions.
23	10	"Sleepers"	Steven A. Adelson	James Thorpe	December 18, 2009	1.38
Will and Magnus' investigation into the mysterious disappearances of privileged young adults leads them to a rehab clinic in Mexico that is run by Tesla. He reveals he cured them with a serum that is meant to turn them into vampires in 30 years, thereby restoring the extinct species. However one of the patients (Chad Rook) learned the hard way that death also triggers the conversion; he then kills his friends from rehab to convert them as well. The group kidnap Tesla but quickly realize his aims are not as consistent as theirs. The Sanctuary team finds Tesla's failsafe, a "de-vamper", and break into the vampires' hideout. Tesla then uses the device to convert them back to human, but during the struggle accidentally targets himself and is also de-vamped. Tesla is very distressed at this development and can find no way to regain his vampire status. However, he discovers he has gained a new power: magnetism.
24	11	"Haunted"	Peter DeLuise	Damian Kindler & James Thorpe	January 8, 2010	N/A
Druitt rescues a group of Empaths from a sinking ship off the coast of South Africa. However, his murderous tendencies have returned and he murders an empath. Magnus kills and then revives Druitt, at which point the base goes into lockdown mode. Magnus and her team discover that the base is in fact under the control of an energy creature, which is revealed to be the cause for Druitt's insanity. The creature attempts to kill everyone so that it may spread, but Will is able to reach the main power switch and reboot the power, allowing Henry to free the others. With little time, Henry lowers the EM shield to allow Druitt to teleport to the creature to have him as a host again; inhabited by the creature, Druitt then teleports away with "no destination in mind."
25	12	"Kali (Part 1)"	Martin Wood	Alan McCullough	January 15, 2010	1.49
Several docile abnormals around the world have been attacking the Human population, but unlike Lazarus which affected them in "Revelations", the abnormals are attacking out of fear. The investigation leads the team to the Mumbai Sanctuary run by Ravi (Shaker Paleja), where a man is found murdered, discovered to be over 200 years old, and was connected with the ancient Cult of Kali, whose followers can foretell disaster. Mumbai is revealed to be the epicenter of the behaviour change. The victim was a host to a Macri, a thought-to-be extinct species of spider which requires a human host to survive and has sneaked itself inside Will. He falls ill and later receives visions of Kali (Sahar Biniaz). A group of mercenaries led by Edward Forsythe (Callum Blue), who killed the former host, kidnap Will because they know the Macri has a connection to Big Bertha, who is revealed to still be alive. Forsythe forces the Macri out of Will so he would become the new host. After succeeding, the mercenaries leave Will to die.
26	13	"Kali (Part 2)"	Martin Wood	Damian Kindler	January 15, 2010	1.49
Will is found and stabilized, and although he is no longer host to the Macri, he still has a psychic connection to Kali, who is later revealed to be a manifestation of Big Bertha. He leaves the Sanctuary and follows the streets of Mumbai to find and stop her from obeying Forsythe's commands. Meanwhile, Terrance Wexford (Paul McGillion) is putting pressure on Magnus' leadership for hiding the fact she allowed Big Bertha to live, as it is capable of manipulating tectonic plates. Forsythe takes to the Indian Ocean and wills Big Bertha into the convergence of three tectonic plates to start creating a new island. Magnus attempts to knock her out with a Long Range Acoustic Device, but fails. However, Forsythes loses his concentration, allowing Will to reach out to Kali. He convinces her to stop of her own accord in exchange for being left alone. As she does, however, Wexford decides to relieve Magnus of command and take over as head of the Sanctuary Network before dropping numerous depth charges on Big Bertha with the intent to kill her. This only succeeds in angering her; feeling betrayed, she turns against Will, and then sets out to launch a tsunami.

== Cast ==
=== Regular cast ===
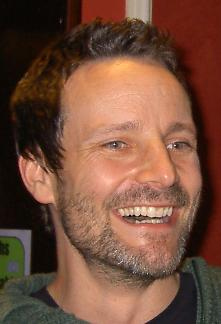
Ryan Robbins, who plays Henry Foss, has been upgraded to a series regular.

The second season began with the original cast from the first season. Amanda Tapping returns as series protagonist Helen Magnus, a 158-year-old English scientist who runs the Sanctuary Network. The producers intended for Magnus to be more angry and vulnerable following Ashley's death after the first three episodes. Robin Dunne returns as Will Zimmerman, a former forensic psychiatrist who has been Magnus' protégé since the pilot. After the first season, the producers made Will more confrontational towards Magnus after feeling more comfortable working with her. Christopher Heyerdahl portrays two characters: Bigfoot, an abnormal who works in the Sanctuary, and John Druitt, Magnus' former fiancé and father to Ashley. Ryan Robbins returns as Henry Foss. A recurring actor in the first season, Robbins was upgraded to a series regular in the second.

Emilie Ullerup returns as Ashley, Magnus' daughter who was written out of the series after "Eulogy". The decision to kill off the character came from an agreement between series creator Damian Kindler and the commissioning networks, as they felt this development would "have the deepest, most dramatic impact on the series and the characters." Director Martin Wood also believed that her death would add a sense of jeopardy on the show. When Ullerup first heard Ashley would be killed off, she was under the impression that her character was not well received by the fans. After the second season aired however, Ullerup noticed an outpouring from fans against Ashley's death. Following her death, the producers were willing to develop an Ashley story for the third season.

Agam Darshi joined the cast as Kate Freelander, described by Syfy as "a swindler, con artist and thief who finds herself in an uneasy alliance with Dr. Magnus after her business relationship with the Cabal goes sour." The producers intended for Kate to be an unlikeable character at first, but by the end of the season have "99 percent of the people who don't like Kate, [...] like Kate." The producers also noted that Kate would begin to prove herself by the third episode "Eulogy", and the ninth episode "Penance" would become important to Kate's evolution from "first class bitch" to a more open character when her father's death is revisited.

=== Recurring cast and guest appearances ===
Jonathon Young returns as half-vampire Nikola Tesla. In the tenth episode, the character was "de-vamped". Kindler felt this development was a bold choice, but also believed his vampirism was the least interesting character trait against being a genius and having electricity-based powers. The producers wanted to make Tesla somewhat heroic by sacrificing that part of him. Like the first season, there were instances where Young was unavailable to shoot some of his scenes due to theatre commitments, so he was replaced by a body double. Christine Chatelain returns as Will's girlfriend Clara Griffin. Clara was killed off in the second episode; Tapping viewed the death as an "important casualty" that has resonance to the main characters. Robert Lawrenson made a recurring appearance as Declan McRae, the head of the London Sanctuary following the death of James Watson in the season one finale. The character was originally going to be introduced in "Hero", but Kindler decided it would be better for the character to be introduced earlier in the season.

The season also introduced numerous guest appearances. Babz Chula appeared as a Cabal scientist in the season premiere, a character that was originally a German male; Chula accepted Tapping's offer to appear on the show after they met at an awards ceremony. Christopher Gauthier appears as Walter and his alter-ego, "the Adjuster", in "Hero". Gauthier modeled the Adjuster's voice from Christian Bale's Batman. The scenes where Walter was worn out from the suit that is killing him mirrored Gauthier's performance because of the suit he had to wear constantly, which consisted of two sets of jogging outfits, cotton padding, and a wetsuit. Because the producers were impressed with Walter, they wanted him to return in the next season. Mandy May, the wife of director Steven A. Adelson, appears in full prosthetics as the abnormal Jack in "Fragments"; May previously appeared on the series as the face of Sally the mermaid. In the same episode, Colin Cunningham played the antagonist Gerald. Cunningham was offered a role because he was long-time friends with some of the crew members, as is the same case when it came to casting Anne Marie Loder, wife of director Peter DeLuise, as Rachel. Eureka actress Erica Cerra makes a guest appearance as the telepath Emma in "Veritas". Cerra's casting by the producers was "really easy" as it was based on her work in other science fiction productions, especially Eureka.

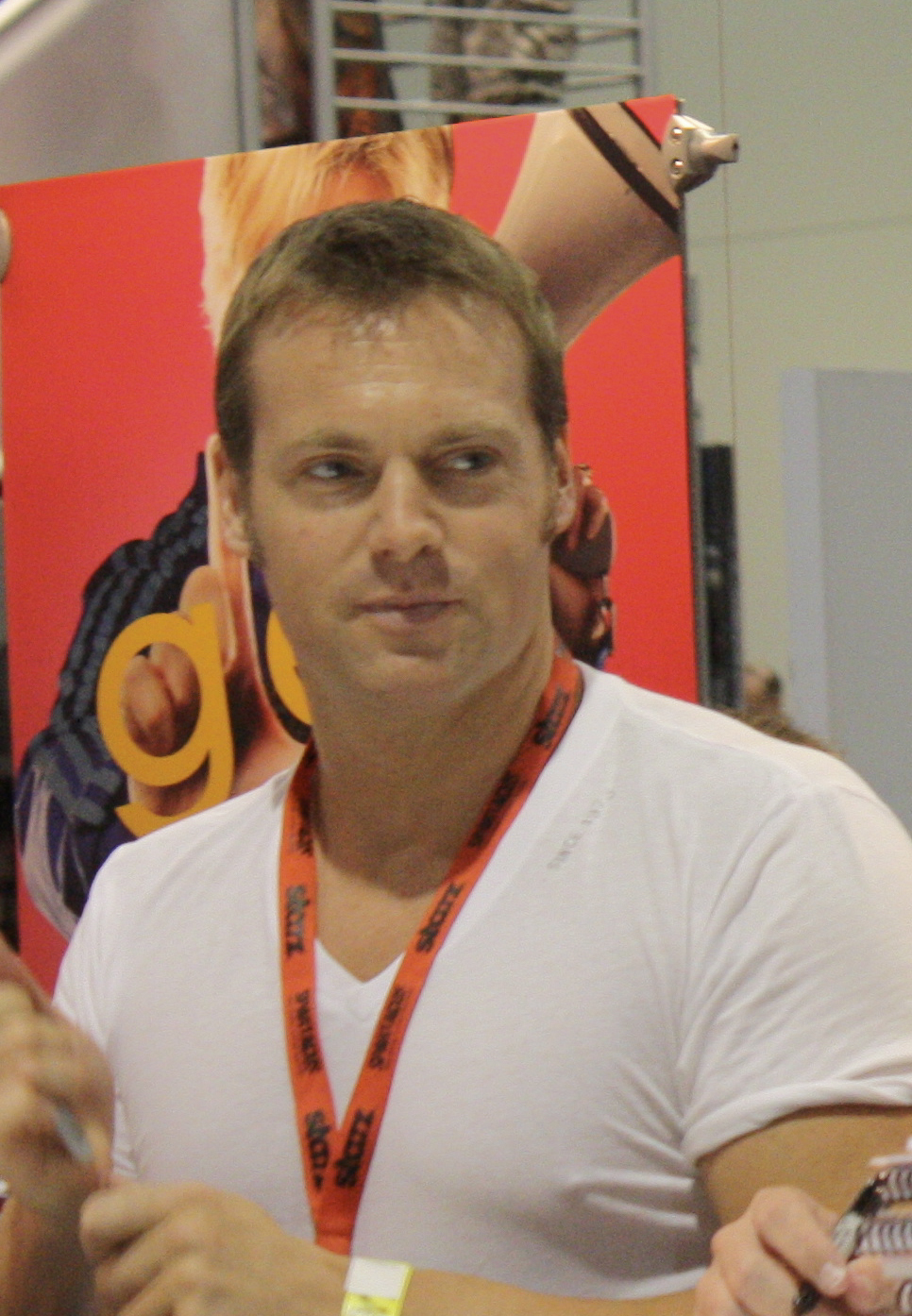
Michael Shanks guest stars as Jimmy in "Penance".

Tapping's former Stargate SG-1 co-star Michael Shanks guest starred as Jimmy in "Penance". Shanks had an interest in playing Jimmy because of the edginess of the character. Shanks also suggested Aleks Paunovic, actor and part-time boxer, for the part as the Diukon Duke; being a boxer fit into the character's violent nature. Paul McGillion returns as Wexford in the season finale. McGillion first appeared as Wexford in the original webisodes, and since then the producers wanted him to return. Tapping believed that placing him in the finale was "the perfect place for him." Callum Blue was cast as the finale's antagonist, Edward Forsythe, as the producers believed Blue could portray somebody who is both charming and evil. In the same episode, Sahar Biniaz was cast as Kali; Biniaz was chosen as the producers believed her physical appearance was goddess-like. Balinder Johal played a cult member; she was the first person to audition for the part, and the producers cast her as she was spiritual, calm, and soft in her appearance. Johal taught the cast how to speak Hindi in parts of the dialogue. The producers were hoping to cast David Hewlett, another Stargate alum, in a guest spot; however, this was met by scheduling issues, as he was shooting a film at the time. Despite this the producers were confident they would cast Hewlett "eventually."

== Production ==
=== Development ===
Syfy officially announced the commissioning of a second season of Sanctuary in November 2008 due to the ratings success of the pilot episode, which totalled over three million viewers. Writer and executive producer Sam Egan left the series after the first season. Andrea Gorfolova, Carrie Mudd and Keith Beedie join creator Damian Kindler, director Martin Wood, and actress Amanda Tapping as the show's executive producers.

=== Writing ===
The second season saw the introduction of a writing team; Sara Cooper, Alan McCullough and James Thorpe were hired as additional writers to Kindler. Because of the writing team, it allowed Kindler and the team to hold meetings, whereas in the first season it was just him discussing with Egan. One of the goals in writing the second season is to further explore the global Sanctuary Network, because in the Sanctuary universe abnormals can be found all around the world. Some international Sanctuary bases were mentioned in the first season, but in the second season, the producers wished to visit some of those bases. Introducing new Sanctuaries and its characters would widen the breadth of the show. They also wished to start introducing abnormals that cannot walk, including an oil-like abnormal in "End of Nights" and the fire elemental "Penance". Kindler wrote both parts of "End of Nights", "Pavor Nocturnus", "Next Tuesday", "Haunted" and the second part of "Kali". McCullough wrote "Hero", "Veritas", "Penance" and the first part of "Kali". Cooper wrote "Eulogy" and "Fragments", while Thorpe wrote "Sleepers", and co-wrote "Pavor Nocturnus" and "Haunted" with Kindler.

Following the cliffhanger of the first-season finale, Kindler worked to figure out how to conclude the story and managed to write the outlines of the first two episodes in two days. He also consulted with the writing team to look at all the problems on how to conclude the story. "Eulogy" was conceived as an important episode in the lives of the main characters following the aftermath of "End of Nights", as well as dealing with the loss of Ashley. Kindler said of the episode "it's one thing to end on a terrible tragic cliffhanger, it's another in a satisfactory manner lay all things to rest appropriately." In writing the episode Cooper was knowledgeable on "medical jargon," as she once wrote for the medical drama series House. In writing his first script "Hero", McCullough was initially concerned that it would be met by resistance from the producers because of the special effects that would be involved, but was "floored" to find out it was entirely possible because of Anthem Visual Effects. The producers were originally hesitant in including "Hero" as the fourth episode, as it was considered lighter in tone as Magnus was trying to get over Ashley's death from "Eulogy". "Pavor Nocturnus" came early in the development of the season, as Kindler wanted to show an episode about Magnus' work going "horribly wrong," and explore the opportunity to have the heroes warned that their work has consequences. Described as the "darkest, scariest, creepiest episode ever" by Tapping, it also featured scenes Kindler was never comfortable with, and did not want to show again, including the assault of naked women, and child killings.

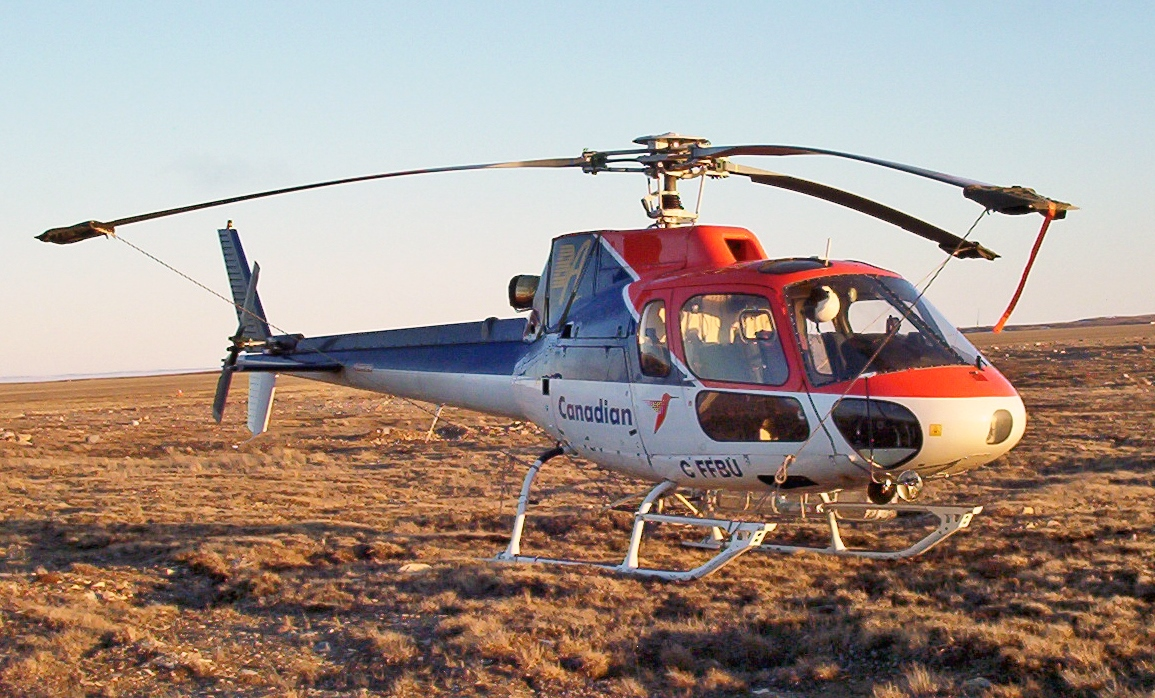
The idea behind "Next Tuesday" came when Damian Kindler and Martin Wood found a rescue helicopter that was for sale.

"Fragments" was written to be in real time format. Kindler described the episode as a "nice procedural, with heart," that follows the same style as episodes of the medical drama ER, where "stuff goes down and you have to kind of follow the team in different aspects and see how they're handling the situation." The idea behind "Next Tuesday" came when Kindler and Wood noticed a rescue helicopter that was available for rent, prompting the two to come up with a "helicopter story." The episode also introduces a next level in Will and Magnus' friendship; arguments, which would create a "far more realistic thread of tension" between the two characters who "obviously love each other," and "obviously get along," which Kindler felt made a "cool character layer." This was also based on the producers themselves, who despite being good friends, often argue while producing the series.

"Sleepers" was developed because the producers wanted to do a Tesla-centric episode, as they view him as one of their favorite characters. "Haunted" rounds Druitt to "something unexpected." The producers were aware that Druitt became more insane the more he teleports, and they wanted to find an explanation why, hence the creation of the energy creature. "Kali" was designed as a somewhat "faith versus science" episode, with faith as the winning party, because any host to the macri would need a spiritual understanding to it; the cult of Kali are religious, so they would make suitable hosts, but Edward Forsythe is a believer of science, and would not make a suitable host as he does not share the cult's understanding. In the original draft, Magnus would fall ill, but that later changed to Will before the episode was filmed. Some episodes in the season originally followed a different order. "Pavor Nocturnus" was originally going to be the fourth episode, while "Hero" would become the tenth. "Sleepers" would also be in an earlier slot. However, the order changed, partially due to availability issues with Jonathon Young for "Sleepers". The writers were also working on a Bigfoot-centric episode, where he returns to his home. However, before it could be written, the networks were unhappy with the idea.

=== Filming ===
Filming began in late March 2009, and finished on the end of July the same year. Director Martin Wood wanted to film the season in a more graphic novel style. Wood directed both parts of "End of Nights", "Hero", "Next Tuesday" and both parts of "Kali". Brenton Spencer directed "Eulogy", "Pavor Nocturnus" and "Penance". The producers felt that Spencer did "a great job" in making sense on a lot of moves he had to make, as well as understanding that the stories are important in getting things back on track in "Eulogy". The episode ended up being 17 minutes longer than usual, so much of it had to be cut. Steven A. Adelson directed "Fragments" and "Sleepers". Amanda Tapping directed "Veritas", her first directorial credit since the Stargate SG-1 episode "Resurrection" in 2004. To direct the scenes featuring Magnus, Tapping rehearsed them to decide how it would be shot, then appointed somebody to handle the cameras. Peter DeLuise directed "Haunted". Lee Wilson from Anthem Visual Effects directed a scene in "Hero", while Robbins directed a scene from "Fragments" when his character recorded Rachel's documentary.

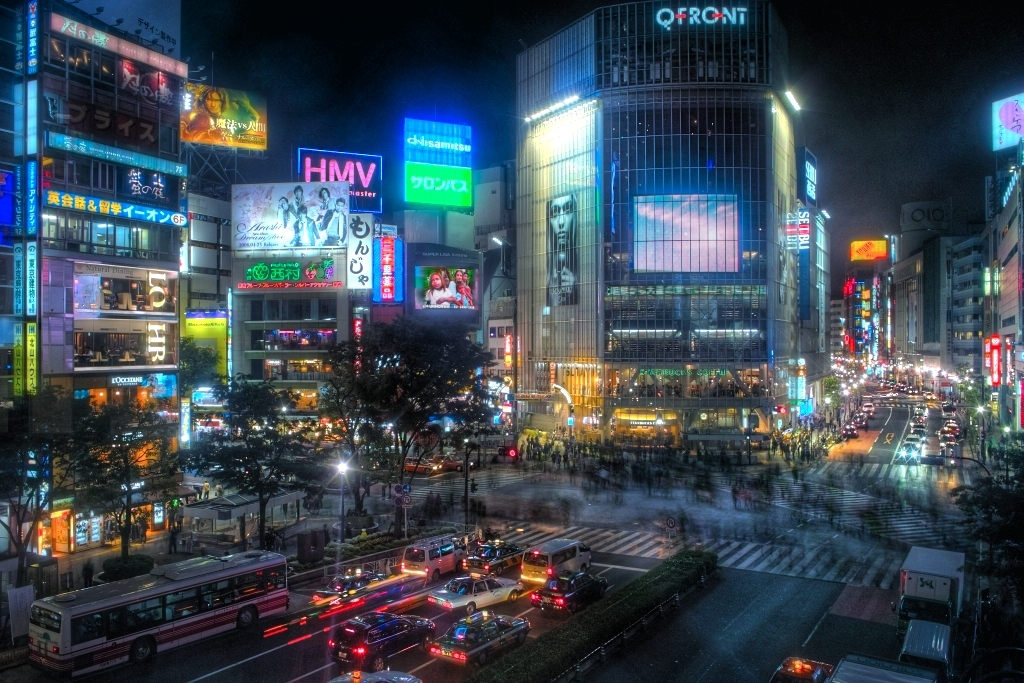
Some scenes of the second season were filmed on location in Tokyo, including the Shibuya crossing (pictured).

Like the first season, much of the second was filmed on green screen sets in a studio in Burnaby, British Columbia, though also like the first season, there are more instances it was shot on practical sets and on location, most of which taking place just outside the studio. The first part of "End of Nights" had scenes filmed at a large empty warehouse. At some point, Dunne, Kindler, Tapping and Wood were sent to Tokyo to promote the series for Syfy Asia. The four decided to use the opportunity to film some scenes for the finale there, one of which was filmed in the Shibuya crossing. Filming took place just as a monsoon season was kicking in. In addition, they noticed a concert hall and took pictures of one of its angles as they deem the architecture suitable for a Tokyo Sanctuary base.

During the shoot of the first part of "End of Nights", Kindler loaned his car for a car chase sequence. A later scene involved having the car shot at by snipers. To prevent damage to the car, the bullet holes were made from visual effects. In "Pavor Nocturnus", the crew had to make the Sanctuary set ruined in a post-apocalyptic state. Set designer Bridget McGuire made the set look "horrible" overnight, but then had to clean it up for the last scene. They also "completely trashed" the street sets in the studio. "Next Tuesday" was considered a bottle episode as it was largely filmed in one set, a water tank some 14 feet deep and 70 feet long, in a studio. The episode was filmed over five 13-hour days, not including a two-day break midway through, becoming the fastest time filming a Sanctuary episode. Wood directed the episode from the water rather than dry land. The following episode "Penance" was largely filmed at a constructed city set some three and a half blocks in size, which was previously used in the superhero film Watchmen.

The Mumbai slum set in the season finale was constructed on the parking lot of the studio, which took two to three weeks to complete. The finale was filmed during one of the hottest heatwaves to hit British Columbia; Tapping found that the set was hotter than the average temperature of the actual Mumbai. Three main cameras were used, one of which was crane-operated. 60 extras were used, the highest number used in an Sanctuary episode. For the extras to be used in more than one scene, they wore many different costumes. The streeting area was also limited in size, so the streets were recycled frequently with every scene. The practical sets of the Sanctuary offices and corridors were also redesigned to look like the Mumbai Sanctuary.

=== Music ===
Andrew Lockington was appointed the series composer in the season. The producers liked Lockington's contribution to the score as it was more heightened than it was in the first season. Lockington would also capture the emotional temper when it comes to scoring for the emotional scenes. The composer sampled several instruments from around the world to give the score a more ethnic, international feel. Some episodes feature the score taking different styles. For instance "Fragments" features a "cool Michael Mann soundtrack." In "Kali", the score adopted a more Bollywood-style theme, particularly during Will's dance sequence. In addition to the score, there were occasional instances where popular music was featured. "End of Nights" featured a track from the Toronto-based hip hop group Down with Webster.

=== Effects ===
Anthem Visual Effects resumed their duties of producing the visual effects for the second season. The company's Lee Wilson noted that their workload for the second season "increased exponentially" over the first, with some episodes containing as many as 500 visual effects shots. The produce decided to "re-jig" the opening title sequence, which they wanted to do each year. The photograph where Magnus meets Albert Einstein changed to aviation pilot Amelia Earhart. The producers noticed that the visual effects have been made "more wondrous than we did the season before," as they were able to produce certain actions that they never tried before. The steno in "Eulogy" was designed to look adorable, harmless and bunny-like in its infancy, but more menacing when it grows up. In making the Adjuster fly in "Hero", both visual and practical effects were used; some of the simpler sequences involved Gauthier hooked up to a velocity rig, but in order to make him fly over the city skyline, a computer-generated avatar was created. The design of the coleanthropus in the same episode was based on a mix of insect and dinosaur.

The second season introduces "moving zorts," an upgraded technique the film crew used to complete the effect where Druitt teleports. The zorts were used specifically to make the sequences where the cast around Heyerdahl freeze until he leaves the screen. The producers wanted to have the camera move during those shots, as they believed it would be "way cooler to have those zorts on the move." One of the more difficult moving zorts included a "triple zort" with other characters who could teleport on the same shot in "End of Nights". The sequence was difficult for Tapping, as she had to carry a prop weighing approximately 73 pounds. A three-dimensional hologram of Rachel's office was included in "Fragments"; it was originally intended to feature the hologram throughout the episode, but because doing so would be costly, the producers decided to have one scene with the hologram, so Henry could use it as a blueprint to make an identical office with boxes. For the finale, Anthem decided to make the macri and Big Bertha look like the same creature, though Bertha would be a considerably larger creature. Some scenes involve the macri interacting with real life objects, including clothing. To make a scene where the macri enters a jacket, Wilson used fishing wire to move a sleeve slightly. Big Bertha's actions meanwhile, were largely made underwater. Anthem found that making underwater effects was difficult because there was a different style of movement. Additionally, Anthem produced a sequence where Wexford launches depth charges from his ship. The producers were looking for stock footage of the dropping depth charges, but they could not find one in high-definition.

An air pump placed under the helicopter (see the water jet below the helicopter) allowed it to sway, which was used to mimic the battle between the vampire squid and sea scorpion. In addition, Amanda Tapping (bottom left) was able to throw the flare in her hand, to the helicopter in only one take.

In addition to visual effects, other forms of physical effects were produced. In "Hero", there was a scene where the camera appeared to be shot from inside a water tank. Instead, a water tank was placed between the camera and the actors, where Alka-Seltzer was placed at the bottom to simulate bubbles. Wood previously used this technique in the first-season episode "Requiem" as well as in Stargate Atlantis. The Adjuster comic books at the end of the episode were designed by artists who occasionally work for DC Comics. Dunne wore a mullet and a white eye contact lens in "Pavor Nocturnus" for Will's alternate self in a dystopian future. The vampire squid-related effects for "Next Tuesday" were made possible by visual aids. For the shots where the squid swims on the water surface, the production crew used a radio-controlled boat to mimic a wake. When the squid erupts from the water, they placed a beach ball underwater and released it to mimic the splash. To make the helicopter sway during the battles between the squid and sea scorpion, an air pump was placed below it. However, doing so added the side effect of strong currents, proving difficult for the cast to swim towards the helicopter.

The season also includes stunt work. Weeks before filming "End of Nights", Heyerdahl practiced sword fighting to be done against the hybrids in the second part. Jonathon Young performed his own stunts for "Sleepers", including being run over by a car and falling from a car. Both stunts involved harnesses and other safety measures. Young also participated in a fight scene with the other vampire characters, but he ended up injuring two of the actors. In one instance Young hit Chad Rook in the face, which caused a fang insert to puncture his lip.

== Broadcast and reception ==
=== Broadcast and ratings ===
The season commenced airing on Syfy from October 9, 2009, and aired nearly every Friday night until the two-part finale "Kali" on January 15, 2010. It aired alongside the first season of Stargate Universe. The season started off with 1.85 million viewers. Ratings were up 18 per cent in terms of adults aged between 18 and 49, and 7 per cent in adults aged between 25 and 54 compared to the average of the first season. After "Sleepers" aired, the season was seen by an average of 1.55 million viewers per episode. Timeshifted ratings for the season increases from live viewers by 45.9 per cent, increasing the average to 2.2 million viewers per episode. In Canada, the season premiered on October 9 on Space, a cable channel that specialises in science fiction programs. Each episode would be available on demand on the channel's website after they aired. It was moved from The Movie Network, which originally aired the first season. In the United Kingdom, the season premiered on ITV4 on October 12, 2009, and finished on January 18, 2010. It started with 334,000 viewers for the first episode, and ended with 268,000 for the finale. In Australia, the season started airing on July 12, 2010 on ABC2.

=== Critical reception ===
There are some series that are simply fun to watch, and Sanctuary is one of the best. Like stepping into the pages of a favorite graphic novel, the viewer is swept into a world that has immortals and "abnormals" who exist in the world, but are not always appreciated much less accepted by ordinary folk.

— Monsters and Critics

The season was met with generally positive reviews. Mark Wilson of About.com believed that after the series was "finding its feet," and "looks like a harbinger of the new, more confident Sanctuary," but added "there's still work to be done." He also stated "because of the talents involved, the wide-open concept, and the way it's created, Sanctuary has huge potential. The season 2 premiere is good to great, with a fantastic performance from Tapping and a real escalation of the Cabal threat. Let's hope that the show continues to develop and evolves, like its characters, into the show it's capable of becoming." In a DVD review of the season, Monsters and Critics rated it five out of five, stating that fans "will be very happy" with the season set.

John Sinnott of DVD Talk said that while "the show still has a lot of charm," he felt it did not live up to the standards of the first season. Sinnott criticised the season for wrapping up the Cabal story line in the first two episodes, expecting it to continue throughout the season, as well as accusing the writers of throwing out "a lot of aspects that made the end of the first season so great." However, he felt there were good episodes, naming "Sleepers" as his favourite, and also saying he liked "Hero". He summed up that the season was "still worth watching and enjoyable, just not as gripping as the first season," believing it comes "recommended" to those who wish to purchase the season box set. David Blackwell of Enterline Media stated that the second season "continues to amaze as a show I first wrote off as bad. I'm glad I'm still giving this show a second chance as it continues to deliver great character arcs and stories." Blackwell named "Pavor Nocturnus", "Veritas" and "Haunted" as the standout episodes. CliqueClack TV believed the season was a "mixed bag"; "End of Nights" was considered "the most thrilling hours of television Sanctuary has ever produced," but the season later "suffered mostly from failure to follow through with the Cabal/Ashley story arc."

Critical reactions towards the introduction of Kate Freelander was also mixed. Mark Wilson stated "the growling sass-mouth feels out of place. Darshi's performance is good, at least, so we'll just have to see if the writers are capable of integrating her into the cast." John Sinnot meanwhile, started "I always found [Ashley] a bit irritating, so it was no big loss. For some reason however, they've replaced her with another annoying young woman, Kate Freelander. She's basically the same character as Ashley, tough as nails on the outside but still a vulnerable young woman on the inside, but this time in an Indian shell."

=== Awards and nominations ===
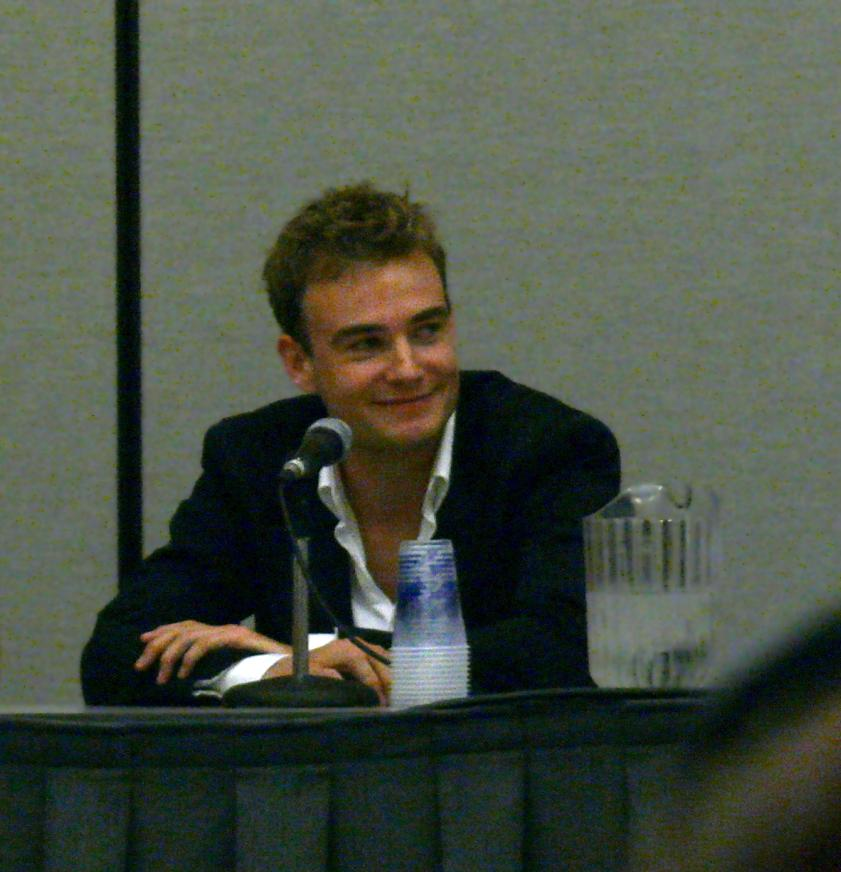
Dunne narrowly lost a Constellation Award for Best Actor by David Tennant, by only one per cent of the votes, though he did win a Leo Award for a similar category.

Overall the second season won seven awards, all them Leo Awards, out of 17 nominations from the same ceremony. "Pavor Nocturnus" won three of those wins; Brenton Spencer won "Best Direction", Christina McQuarrie won "Best Costume Design", and Robin Dunne won "Best Lead Performance by a Male". Christopher Gauthier won "Best Guest Performance by a Male" for his role in "Hero". Todd Masters, Holland Miller, Harlow Macfarlane, Werner Pretorius and Yukio Okajima won "Best Make-Up" for "Fragments". Christopher Heyerdahl won "Best Supporting Performance by a Male" for "Haunted", and Bridget McGuire won "Best Production Design" in the season finale, "Kali Part 2". The season was also nominated for "Best Dramatic Series", but lost to Stargate Universe.

The second part of "Kali" represented the series for "Best Television Series – Drama" in the 2010 Directors Guild of Canada Awards, but lost out to the comedy–drama series Being Erica. Elsewhere, Dunne was also nominated for "Best Male Performance in a 2009 Science Fiction Television Episode" at the 2010 Constellation Awards, but lost out to Doctor Who actor David Tennant, for his role in the episode "The Waters of Mars", by only one percent of the votes.

== Home video releases ==
A DVD box set of the second season, published by E1 Entertainment, was first released in Region 1 on June 15, 2010, in Region October 2 4, 2010, and in Region 4 on June 9, 2010 It was also released on Blu-ray Disc in the United States and Australia on the same days the DVD counterpart was released. The four-disc set consists of all 13 episodes, each with audio commentaries from cast and crew. The set also includes numerous special featurettes: Amanda Tapping Directs "Veritas", "Next Tuesday" – Anatomy of an Episode, Sanctuary Visual Effects, Sanctuary for Kids, Behind the Scenes and On the Set, Sanctuary Goes to Japan and Dancing in Mumbai, as well as a presentation from San Diego Comic-Con, a blooper reel and photo gallery.
