= Witness Insecurity =

Witness Insecurity may refer to:

- Witness Insecurity (film), a 2011 American film
- Witness Insecurity (TV series), a 2012 Hong Kong TV series
