= Sympathetic =

Sympathetic may refer to:

- Sympathy, in psychology, a feeling of compassion or identification with another
- Sympathetic detonation, a detonation, usually unintended, of an explosive charge by a nearby explosion
- Sympathetic magic, in religion, magic, and anthropology, the belief that like affects like, that something can be influenced through its relationship with another thing
- Sympathetic nervous system, in neurology and neuroscience, a part of the autonomic nervous system
- Sympathetic resonance, a harmonic phenomenon wherein a body responds to external vibrations
- Sympathetic strings, in music theory, strings on a musical instrument that resonate without contact
- "Sympathetic", a song by Seether from Disclaimer II

== See also ==
- Sympathy (disambiguation)
