= Nicole Muñoz =

Canadian film and television actress (born 1997)

- Born: June 24, 1997 (age 29); Vancouver, British Columbia, Canada
- Occupation: Actress
- Years active: 2004–present

Nicole Muñoz (born June 24, 1997) is a Canadian film and television actress. She is known for her roles as Pamela (Pammy) Wagner in the film The Tooth Fairy, as Young Cody in the film Fetching Cody, and for her role as Christie Tarr (née McCawley) in the Syfy television series Defiance. In 2019, Muñoz began starring as Jack in season 4 of Syfy series Van Helsing.

== Early and personal life ==
Muñoz was born in Vancouver, British Columbia to a Spanish father and a Québécois mother. She has two sisters, Britta and Sophia. She moved to Toronto when she was cast in Defiance at age 18.

== Career ==
Muñoz has over 60 commercial spots and 40 film and TV credits to her name. She made her television debut in an episode of Jeremiah. She also made guest appearances on many TV shows including, Da Vinci's Inquest, Tru Calling, Stephen King's Dead Zone, Stargate: Atlantis and Supernatural. She got her first recurring role in 2009 in the space travel, television science fiction drama series, Defying Gravity playing a Palestinian girl. In 2006 and 2007, she appeared in 4 made-for-television movies as well. In 2009, she made a guest appearance on Syfy series, Sanctuary episode, Pavor Nocturnus playing Jessica Mitchell, a young girl lost in a post-apocalyptic world.

Muñoz has also played small roles in big-budget movies shot in Canada including Fantastic Four, Pathfinder, Another Cinderella Story, Center Stage: Turn It Up and the Dwayne Johnson starrer, Tooth Fairy. Her other films include HBO thriller Imaginary Playmate, and The Last Mimzy, for which she was one of the nominees for the 29th Young Artist Awards category, Best Performance by a Young Ensemble Cast. In mid-2012, she was cast in Defiance in a recurring role. In 2016 Muñoz was cast opposite Laurie Holden in Pywacket, an occult movie directed by Adam MacDonald.

In 2019, Muñoz began starring as Jack in season 4 of Syfy series Van Helsing.

== Filmography ==
=== Film ===
Year	Title	Role	Notes
2005	Fantastic Four	Little Girl	
2005	Fetching Cody	Young Cody	
2006	The Tooth Fairy	Pamela Wagner	
2007	The Last Mimzy	Kid with Braces	
2007	Pathfinder	Little Sister	
2007	Bratz Kidz: Sleepover Adventure	Jade	Direct-to-video film; voice role
2008	Another Cinderella Story	Young Mary Santiago (age 11)	Direct-to-video film
2008	Center Stage: Turn It Up	Bella Parker	Released theatrically in Australia, but as a television film in the U.S.
2009	Hardwired	Little Girl	
2010	Tooth Fairy	Kelly	
2010	Marmaduke	3rd OC Girl	
2017	Gregoire	Laura	
2017	Pyewacket	Leah	
2019	A Score to Settle	Isha	

=== Television ===
Year	Title	Role	Notes
2004	Jeremiah	Little Girl	1 episode
2004	Da Vinci's Inquest	Dino's Daughter	1 episode
2005	Tru Calling	Little Girl	1 episode
2005	Stephen King's Dead Zone	Eva Cortes	1 episode
2005	Stargate: Atlantis	Hedda	1 episode
2006	Supernatural	Nora	Episode: "Everybody Loves a Clown"
2006	Imaginary Playmate	Candace Brewer	Television film
2006	A Girl Like Me: The Gwen Araujo Story	Chita Araujo (age 10)	Television film
2007	Defying Gravity	Palestinian Girl	4 episodes
2007	Nobody	Rose	Television film
2007	A Family Lost	Claire Williamson	Television film
2007	Perfect Child	Lily	Television film
2009	Sanctuary	Jessica Mitchell	Episode "Pavor Nocturnus"
2012	The Music Teacher	Molly	Television film
2013	Hemlock Grove	Hermila	2 episodes
2013	Baby Sellers	Dolorita	Television film
2013	Scarecrow	Maria	Television film
2013	Chupacabra vs. The Alamo	Sienna Seguin	Television film
2013–2015	Defiance	Christie Tarr née McCawley	Recurring role, 23 episodes
2014	Once Upon a Time	Young Lily Page	Episodes: "Breaking Glass", "Lily"
2015	Sorority Murder	Alex Johnson	Television film
2015	The Wrong Girl	Alison	Television film
2015	Mark & Russell's Wild Ride	Angela	Television film
2016	Center Stage: On Pointe	Bella Parker	Television film
2016	My Husband is Missing	Casey Bradshaw	Television film
2017	Christmas Princess	Donaly Marquez	Television film
2019–2021	Van Helsing	Jack	Main role (season 4–season 5)
2020	The 100	Lucy	Episode: "Anaconda"
2020	Supernatural	Sylvia	Episode: "Gimme Shelter"
2021	Two Sentence Horror Stories	Sofia	Episode: "Fix"
2021–2022	Diggstown	Ellery Lopez	Recurring role, 12 episodes
2022	Cruel Instruction	Sofia	Television film
2022–2023	A Million Little Things	Vali	5 episodes
2024	Wild Cards	Summer Lake	Episode: "Show Me the Murder"
2024	Tracker	Daniela Barrera	Episode: "Camden"
