= The Tooth Fairy (film) =

- Promotional poster
- Directed by: Chuck Bowman
- Written by: Stephen J. Cannell
- Produced by: Stephen J. Cannell
- Starring: Nicole Muñoz; Jianna Ballard; Chandra West; Lochlyn Munro; Steve Bacic; Carrie Anne Fleming; Peter New; Jesse Hutch; Ben Cotton; Sonya Salomaa; Karin Konoval; P. J. Soles
- Cinematography: David Pelletier
- Music by: Jon Lee, Richard John Baker
- Distributed by: Anchor Bay
- Release date: August 1, 2006
- Running time: 89 minutes
- Country: United States
- Language: English

The Tooth Fairy is a 2006 American horror film directed by Chuck Bowman. The film was produced by Stephen J. Cannell and was released on August 1, 2006, on DVD in the United States and Canada.

== Plot ==
The events take place in the present day in Northern California. When 12-year-old Pamela goes on vacation with her family to a bed and breakfast in River Bend Road, the girl who lives next door tells her the "true story" of the Tooth Fairy: Many years earlier, the evil Tooth Fairy slaughtered a countless number of children to take their teeth, and now she has returned to kill Pamela and anyone else who gets in her way. The Tooth Fairy pursues the victims unrelentingly, which leads to a gruesome collection of events.

== Cast ==
- Nicole Muñoz as Pamela Wagner
- Jianna Ballard as Emma Ange
- Lochlyn Munro as Peter Campbell
- Chandra West as Darcy Wagner
- Steve Bacic as Cole
- Carrie Anne Fleming as Stephanie "Star" Roberts
- Peter New as Chuck
- Jesse Hutch as Bobby Boulet
- Ben Cotton as Henry
- Sonya Salomaa as Cherise
- Karin Konoval as Elizabeth Craven
- P. J. Soles as Mrs. MacDonald

== Reception ==
Steve Barton of Dread Central gave The Tooth Fairy a rating of 3 out of 5 and in a mildly positive review remarked about the film, "Should you put your brain on auto-pilot, you’ll have some fun."
