= Rick Ravanello =

Canadian actor and ex-bodybuilder (born 1967)

- Born: Richard Alexander Ravanello; 24 October 1967 (age 59); Cape Breton, Nova Scotia, Canada
- Other name: Rick Ravenello
- Occupations: Actor, bodybuilder
- Spouse: Michelle D. Hartman (since 1994)

Rick Ravanello (born 24 October 1967) is a Canadian actor and ex-bodybuilder who has appeared in many other films and television series. Known primarily from action and thriller films, he often portrayed detectives, military men and soldiers.

== Biography ==
One of many other brothers, Ravanello was raised in the Trout Brook Road area of Mira, Cape Breton, and graduated from Riverview Rural High School in 1986. While a young man, he got introduced to weight training. As an actor he debuted in 1996, appearing in several television series, including Stargate SG-1 (episode "Children of the Gods") and Millennium (episode "Weeds"). He portrayed a young Marine Guard in the 1998 made-for-television action-drama film Loyal Opposition: Terror in the White House, and was subsequently cast as Private J. Vaughn in the superhero TV film Nick Fury (1998), opposite David Hasselhoff. UPN cast him as Mednaut Thurston—the role which he continued to play throughout 1998 and 1999—in the short-lived science fiction medical drama series Mercy Point. He starred as a tough military man named Thompson in the Richard Pepin-directed action film Y2K (also known as Terminal Countdown).

He played a small, supporting role of a handsome welder in the Sally Field–Judy Davis vehicle A Cooler Climate (1999), and was a recurring actor on the Canadian police procedural television series Cold Squad (October 1999). In January 2001, he guest-starred in the science-fiction–action series Seven Days opposite Jonathan LaPaglia, portraying Major Gary Jones. In the 2001 television action drama Semper Fi he portrayed the Sergeant of the United States Marine Corps. Ravanello's acting breakthrough came with 2002's Hart's War. In the movie, set in a World War II prisoner of war camp, he starred opposite Bruce Willis as Major Joe Clary. In 2022, Ravanello was the lead of the TV series The Pact, where he played a survivor of a mysterious outbreak.

In the 1990s Ravanello was also a competitive bodybuilder, with an on-stage weight of approximately 190 pounds (86 kilograms). He also has a second degree black belt in Taekwondo and trains Muay Thai.

== Filmography ==
Year	Title and role
2015	Dangerous Company as Aaron Mitchell
2014	Driven Underground as Karl Harvey; Outpost 37/Alien Outpost as Spears
2013	Garage Sales Mystery as Jason Shannon
2012	Nikita as Nicholas Brandt; Hollywood Heights as Trent McCall
2010	Witness Insecurity as Anthony; Weeds as Lars Guinard
2009	Defying Gravity as Jeff Walker
2008	Smoke Jumper as Ray Kulhanck|; The Christmas Clause as Jake; Fatal Kiss (AKA Love to Kill) as Nicholas Landon
2006	Imaginary Playmate as Michael Driscoll
2005	The Cave as Briggs; Bound by Lies as Uniformed Cop; Jane Doe: Vanishing Act as Lacey Hartman
2003	Monte Walsh as Henry Louis "Sugar" Wyman; Criminology 101 as Andy Roitman
2002	Hart's War as Maj. Joe Clary
2001	Semper Fi as Sergeant (uncredited); Out of Line as John Stewart
2000	Skipped Parts as Dougie Dupree
1999	Y2K as Thompson; A Cooler Climate as Handsome Welder; Atomic Train as Police Pilot
1998	Mercy Point as Mednaut Thurston; Shattered Image as Man in Restaurant; Nick Fury: Agent of Shield as Agent J. Vaughn; Peter Benchley's Creature as SEAL Team Member; Storm Chasers: Revenge of the Twister as Security Guard
1997	Doomsday Rock as Parks; Our Mother's Murder as Officer Calder

=== Guest appearances ===
- Lethal Weapon playing David Garrison in episode "Surf N Turf" (#1.2), 28 September 2016
- Criminal Minds playing Bernard Graff in episode "Internal Affairs" (#11.9), 2 December 2015
- Scorpion playing Marcus Bronson in episode "Young Hearts Spark Fire" (#1.19), 23 March 2015
- Castle playing Steve Adams in episode "He's Dead, She's Dead" (#3.2), 27 September 2010
- In Justice playing Alec Southerland in episode "Golden Boy" (#1.3), 13 January 2006
- The Closer playing Devlin Dutton in episode "The Butler Did It" (#1.9), August 2005
- Desperate Housewives playing Bill Cunningham in episode "There Won't Be Trumpets" (#1.17), 3 April 2005
- The Inside playing Scott Bossi in episode "Aidan" (#1.9), 2005
- Monk playing Detective in episode "Mr. Monk and the Captain's Wife" (#2.14), 13 February 2004
- 24 playing Captain Reiss in episode "Day 3: 12:00 a.m.-1:00 a.m." (#3.12), 3 February 2004
- 24 playing Captain Reiss in episode "Day 3: 11:00 p.m.-12:00 a.m." (#3.11), 27 January 2004
- CSI: Crime Scene Investigation playing Ranger Stone in episode "Feeling the Heat" (#4.4), 23 October 2003
- The Lyon's Den playing Larry/Sammy Gentry in episode "Pilot" (#1.1), 28 September 2003
- Boomtown playing Sean Dornan in episode "Crash" (#1.8), 17 November 2002
- Without a Trace playing Brad Dunsmore in episode "He Saw, She Saw" (#1.3), 10 October 2002
- Seven Days playing Major Gary Jones in episode "Adam & Eve & Adam" (#3.10), 10 January 2001
- So Weird playing Lal Nereus in episode "Fathom" (#2.20), 22 April 2000
- Cold Squad playing John Hatcher in episode "Deadly Games: Part 2" (#3.2), 29 October 1999
- First Wave playing Joel Langley in episode "Red Flag" (#2.6), 27 October 1999
- Viper playing Sergio "Sonny" Celeste in episode "The Full Frankie" (#3.6), 26 October 1998
- First Wave playing Anton in episode "Crazy Eddie" (#1.2), 16 September 1998
- The Net playing Mr. Wigan in episode "Deleted" (#1.1), 19 July 1998
- The Outer Limits playing Marcus in episode "In the Zone" (#4.5), 20 February 1998
- Honey, I Shrunk the Kids: The TV Show playing Lars in episode "Honey, Meet the Barbarians" (#1.13), 6 February 1998
- Breaker High playing Apollo in episode "Silence of the Lamborghini" (#1.18), 14 October 1997
- Stargate SG-1 playing Fryatt, guard #2 in episode "Children of the Gods: Part 1" (#1.1), 27 July 1997
- The Outer Limits playing Driver in episode "New Lease" (#3.11), 21 March 1997
- Millennium playing Cop (uncredited) in episode "Weeds" (#1.11), 24 January 1997
- Madison playing Erik in episode "Tattoos, Term Deposits and Tainted Love" (#5.9), 1997
- Madison playing Erik in episode "Skin Deep" (#5.8), 1997
- Viper playing Tremaine in episode "Standoff" (#1.6), 28 October 1996
- Nothing Too Good for a Cowboy playing Chilco Evans in episode "The Natural" (#1.3), ????
