= Imaginary Playmate =

- Written by: Christine Gallagher
- Directed by: William Fruet
- Starring: Dina Meyer; Rick Ravanello; Cassandra Sawtell; Pablo Coffey
- Theme music composer: Mark Mothersbaugh
- Composer: Hal Beckett
- Original language: English

Production
- Running time: 86 minutes
- Production companies: Alexander/Enright and Associates; CBS Paramount Network Television

Original release
- Network: LMN
- Release: December 2, 2006

Imaginary Playmate is a thriller film which debuted on LMN in 2006. Directed by William Fruet and written by Christine Gallagher, the film stars Dina Meyer, Rick Ravanello, Cassandra Sawtell, and Pablo Coffey.

== Plot ==
Suzanne (Dina Meyer) and her 7-year-old stepdaughter Molly Driscoll move into a new house after Molly’s dad Michael becomes manager of a sawmill. Molly’s mother died 2 years earlier after having breast cancer. After noticing the tree swing moving on its own, Molly acquires an imaginary friend named Candace, who she insists is real. Molly asks Suzanne if she can be Candace’s "mummy" as Candace’s real mother died giving birth and Candace suffered mistreatment by her father. The friendship between Molly and Candace starts off innocent (sharing their toys, etc), but later that night, Candace tries to drown Molly during a bath. Molly passes on information gleaned from Candace which it would be impossible for Molly to know, such as the discovery of corn husks and other things found in the attic. Suzanne returns to the attic to return the corn husks, and discovers a hidden room, which she finds disturbing. She shows it to Michael, but he thinks nothing of it.

At school, Molly's teacher becomes uncomfortable about Molly's strange behavior. Suzanne’s belief that something strange is going on is bolstered by her encounter with Dora, who is an elderly resident in a care home where Suzanne volunteers. Dora can apparently see Candace, and Suzanne runs out, nervous. She brings Molly's doctor, Robert, to the house to show him what she found. As Robert explains the magical aspects, Michael comes home. Molly is attacked by Candace because of Suzanne not putting it back. This causes friction between Suzanne and Michael as they increasingly disagree about how to manage Molly’s worrying behavior.

The next day, Suzanne discovers she's pregnant. In bed, Candace becomes hostile, believing she will be replaced, and proceeds to throw things around. Molly is visibly upset by all this and reveals that she knew about the pregnancy thanks to Candace. They go to Dr. Barrett, who is a therapist, and Dr. Barrett believes Molly has created Candace as a way to express her frustrations about her mother being deceased and the fact that the baby is coming. Michael also claims Suzanne got pregnant on purpose, which upsets Suzanne.

Dora stops by the house to give Suzanne a locket for protection. Molly invites Megan, a girl from her school to her house to play. They invite Suzanne to join them in blindfold tag, to which she agrees. As they play, Candace's voice is heard, luring Suzanne to fall down the stairs, only to be stopped by Molly. Megan is then locked in the shed (by Candace), and is let out by Suzanne as Megan's mother arrives. Molly is then seen praying in front of two graves in front of the nearby church. As Suzanne takes her home, a priest is seen observing them.

Suzanne returns to the attic to find some answers to all these strange occurrences. She finds an old notebook, documenting abuse from someone's father. Suzanne sees the name Candace Brewer, proving Candace is real after all. She shows the journal entries to Michael, who clearly doesn't want to hear about any of it.

Despite the protests of Michael and Suzanne, Molly is removed from her school after the incident with Megan and due to the gossip that has been going around about Molly. Later, Dora tells Suzanne about how Candace was let into their lives, and that she is dangerous, and should tread carefully.

Suzanne returns to the church graveyard, and asks the priest about the Brewers and their daughter Candace. Candace is shown to be buried in an unkempt section of the graveyard where sinners are laid to rest. Suzanne does research in newspaper archives and finds the story of Candace’s mother dying when giving birth to Candace's sibling. She also reads that Candace committed suicide due to anguish, which is a sin.

Molly is being haunted by Candace and says that Candace is constantly with her. Molly tearfully tells Suzanne that the baby won't come. The house starts to shake as Suzanne tells Candace to go away. She then attempts to cut down the tree that has the swing, only to be stopped by Michael. She believes Candace has finally gone away.

As Suzanne prepares a nursery for her expected baby, an unseen force knocks Suzanne off a ladder and she is rushed to the hospital. The doctor informs Michael that Suzanne has lost the baby. Molly blames herself for the loss and is kept overnight at the hospital. Distraught, Suzanne and Michael have a fight, and she yells at Michael for not believing anything she says.

Rob comes to the house the next morning to offer his condolences. Suzanne talks to him about Candace and the details of what happened all those years ago. Since the mother died in child birth, she begins to wonder if the baby actually survived, suggesting Candace's death may have been a murder.

Dr. Barrett arrives at the hospital to check on Molly and says that she's in a state of catatonia. She tells Michael that she's going to make a call to a specialist who can help Molly, not knowing Candace has taken over. As Dr. Barrett drives to her destination, she ends up in a car accident while taking a phone call. Her fate is left unknown.

Suzanne and Rob come to the hospital. When Molly awakens, she calls Suzanne "Mummy". Suzanne asks Molly how Candace died, and Molly says that Candace is not dead. She realizes that Molly has been possessed by Candace, and Michael forces them out of the room. Michael tells Suzanne to go away so he can take care of Molly. When Dora is brought to the hospital, she tells Suzanne that Candace needs to be stopped from undoing what happened to her and that there are more pages to look into. Suzanne rushes back to the house and looks in the journal to learn about Father O'Donnell.

Meanwhile, Molly (Candace) insists that Michael take her home from hospital, and he does just that.

Father Phillip tells Suzanne that there was a Father O'Donnell long ago, and shows her the letters he wrote to the Holy Sisters to take in Candace and her mother. Suzanne learns Candace’s father confessed to hanging Candace before living out his life in a mental institution. Suzanne realizes because Candace's father killed her, Candace will kill Michael as revenge, and rushes home.

Michael is at home, and hears Molly calling out to him. He rushes up the stairs, only to be knocked out.

Suzanne heads to the attic, where Candace is visible as a ghostly presence alongside Molly. Candace says that he killed her. She mentions her father trying to suffocate the baby after her mother's death. Candace then reveals that she took her baby sister and left her on the steps of a church so that she wouldn't have to suffer the abuse from her father like she did. Her sister is Dora. It was this act which infuriated her father, who then hanged her.

After pushing Michael down the stairs, Candace encourages Molly to jump from the roof to join her own dead mother because Suzanne doesn't really love her. Suzanne pleads that she does love Molly and that Molly needs to grow up and have her own family. Ultimately, Suzanne convinces Molly to come into her embrace and start again. The family escapes from the house as it starts shaking. As they make it outside, they see Candace glaring down at them before disappearing.

Afterwards, a mother and her son move in. Dora approaches them and asks if they've seen her sister. She is revealed to be the mother of the real estate agent. Shortly afterwards, the boy sees the swing move as they enter the house, implying that Candace is still present.

== Cast ==
- Dina Meyer as Suzanne Driscoll
- Cassandra Sawtell as Molly Driscoll
- Nicole Muñoz as Candace Brewer
- Rick Ravanello as Michael Driscoll
- Pablo Coffey as John Forbes
- Nancy Sivak as Dr. Gail Barrett
- Kurt Evan as Rob Conelly
- Bronwen Smith as Julie
- Grace Vukovic as Megan
- Jim Shepard as Father Phillip
- Gil Hayward as Dr. Emmett Brewer
- Marilyn Vance as Dora
- Rosalynd Roome as Sarah Brewer

== Production and release ==
Filming for Imaginary Playmate was planned to take three weeks. Two weeks were filmed in East Sooke, while the remaining week was filmed at places near Victoria. Filming also took place at Shawnigan Lake and at St. John the Baptist Church and Emery Family Hall in Colwood. Scenes were filmed at Milinear Mill in Shawnigan Lake and Western Forest Products mill in Cowichan Bay. Imaginary Playmate had a production budget of $1.3 million.

Imaginary Playmate was directed by William Fruet and produced by Paul Raymond. The film was written by Christine Gallagher, who was inspired by a real-life story that took place in 2002. She had started living in a house in Laurel Canyon, Los Angeles with her family. Julian, her four-year-old son, informed her a boy was staying in his room, and she immediately moved them out of the home.

Imaginary Playmate was released in November 2006. According to Emmy, it was the "highest-rate original movie" on Lifetime Movie Network. Michael D. Reid of the Times Colonist described the film as a "moody thriller". VideoHound gave it two stars.
