= Craig Ferguson (ice hockey) =

American ice hockey player (born 1970)

- Born: April 8, 1970 (age 56) Castro Valley, California, U.S.
- Height: 5 ft 11 in (180 cm)
- Weight: 202 lb (92 kg; 14 st 6 lb)
- Position: Centre
- Shot: Left
- Played for: Montreal Canadiens; Calgary Flames; Florida Panthers; HC Fribourg-Gottéron; ERC Ingolstadt
- NHL draft: 146th overall, 1989; Montreal Canadiens
- Playing career: 1992–2006

Craig Malcolm Ferguson (born April 8, 1970) is an American former professional ice hockey player. He played 27 games in the National Hockey League with the Montreal Canadiens, Calgary Flames, and Florida Panthers between 1993 and 1999. He later spent several seasons playing in the Swiss Nationalliga A and Deutsche Eishockey Liga, and retired in 2006. Ferguson was drafted by the Canadiens in the seventh round, 146th overall in the 1989 NHL entry draft.

== Playing career ==
=== Collegiate ===
After graduating from Riverview Rural High School in 1988, Ferguson played four years of college hockey for the Yale University Bulldogs of the ECAC. At Yale, Ferguson lived at Calhoun College. Ferguson was one of the twelve players named to the 1988–1989 ECAC Hockey All-Rookie team. Ferguson graduated from Yale with a BA in economics and political science. He returned to New Haven in 1997–1998 as a member of the Beast of New Haven. During the season, he became the first professional hockey player invited to speak at a Master's Tea at Calhoun College; past speakers had included James Earl Jones and Paul Newman.

=== Professional ===
He was drafted in 1989 and turned pro in 1992. He spent much of his career bouncing around the minor leagues, but appeared in 27 National Hockey League games for the Canadiens, Calgary Flames and Florida Panthers. Ferguson recorded one goal (against the Toronto Maple Leafs in Mario Tremblay's first game as coach) and one assist in his NHL career. In 2000, he moved to Europe where he played three seasons for HC Fribourg-Gottéron in the Swiss Nationalliga A, and three with ERC Ingolstadt in the German Deutsche Eishockey Liga.

== Personal ==
Ferguson's father is former NHL player Norm Ferguson. Born in Castro Valley, California to Canadian parents, Ferguson was raised in Sydney, Nova Scotia.

Ferguson and his family later lived in Orlando, Florida.

== Career statistics ==
=== Regular season and playoffs ===
			Regular season					Playoffs
Season	Team	League	GP	G	A	Pts	PIM	GP	G	A	Pts	PIM
1986–87	Sydney Flyers	NSAHA	—	—	—	—	—	—	—	—	—	—
1987–88	Sydney Riverview Rural	CAHS	—	—	—	—	—	—	—	—	—	—
1988–89	Yale University	ECAC	24	11	6	17	20	—	—	—	—	—
1989–90	Yale University	ECAC	28	6	13	19	36	—	—	—	—	—
1990–91	Yale University	ECAC	29	11	10	21	34	—	—	—	—	—
1991–92	Yale University	ECAC	27	9	16	25	26	—	—	—	—	—
1992–93	Fredericton Canadiens	AHL	55	15	13	28	20	5	0	1	1	2
1992–93	Wheeling Thunderbirds	ECHL	9	6	5	11	24	—	—	—	—	—
1993–94	Fredericton Canadiens	AHL	57	29	32	61	62	—	—	—	—	—
1993–94	Montreal Canadiens	NHL	2	0	1	1	0	—	—	—	—	—
1994–95	Fredericton Canadiens	AHL	80	27	35	62	62	17	6	2	8	6
1994–95	Montreal Canadiens	NHL	1	0	0	0	0	—	—	—	—	—
1995–96	Phoenix Roadrunners	IHL	31	6	9	15	25	4	0	2	2	6
1995–96	Saint John Flames	AHL	18	5	13	18	8	—	—	—	—	—
1995–96	Montreal Canadiens	NHL	10	1	0	1	2	—	—	—	—	—
1995–96	Calgary Flames	NHL	8	0	0	0	4	—	—	—	—	—
1996–97	Carolina Monarchs	AHL	74	29	41	70	57	—	—	—	—	—
1996–97	Florida Panthers	NHL	3	0	0	0	0	—	—	—	—	—
1997–98	Beast of New Haven	AHL	64	24	28	52	41	3	2	1	3	2
1998–99	Beast of New Haven	AHL	61	18	27	45	76	—	—	—	—	—
1999–00	Louisville Panthers	AHL	61	29	27	56	28	4	1	3	4	2
1999–00	Florida Panthers	NHL	3	0	0	0	0	—	—	—	—	—
2000–01	HC Fribourg-Gottéron	NLA	42	16	22	38	65	5	0	3	3	18
2001–02	HC Fribourg-Gottéron	NLA	43	10	22	32	106	5	1	0	1	0
2002–03	HC Fribourg-Gottéron	NLA	44	18	14	32	52	—	—	—	—	—
2003–04	ERC Ingolstadt	DEL	51	10	11	21	42	9	0	1	1	10
2004–05	ERC Ingolstadt	DEL	49	9	12	21	28	11	4	2	6	4
2005–06	ERC Ingolstadt	DEL	48	10	11	21	77	—	—	—	—	—
AHL totals			470	176	216	392	354	29	9	7	16	12
NHL totals			27	1	1	2	6	—	—	—	—	—

== Awards and honors ==
Award	Year
All-ECAC Hockey Rookie Team	1988–89
