= Empathy (disambiguation) =

Empathy is the capacity to place oneself emotionally in another's position.

Empathy may also refer to:

== Music ==
- Empathy (Bill Evans and Shelly Manne album), 1962
- Empathy (Mandalay album), 1998
- Empathy (EP), by South Korean singer D.O., 2021
- Empathy, a 2019 EP by Jean Deaux
- "Empathy" (singles), a 2016 collaboration between Jung Yong-hwa and Sunwoo Jung-a
- "Empathy", a song by Ab-Soul from the 2012 album Control System
- "Empathy", a song by Bassnectar from the 2012 album Vava Voom
- "Empathy", a song by Swans from the 1996 album Soundtracks for the Blind
- "Empathy" (Asian Kung-Fu Generation song), a 2021 song by Asian Kung-Fu Generation

== Other uses ==
- Empathy (software), an instant messaging and VoIP client
- Empathy, an early name for the drug MDMA
- "Empathy", an episode of The Good Doctor
- Empathy (novel), a 1992 book by Sarah Schulman

== See also ==
- Empath (disambiguation)
- Empathy, Inc., a 2018 American science fiction thriller film
- Linguistic empathy, a notion in theoretical linguistics
