= The Cave (2005 film) =

2005 American horror film directed by Bruce Hunt

- Theatrical release poster
- Directed by: Bruce Hunt
- Written by: Michael Steinberg; Tegan West
- Produced by: Richard S. Wright; Andrew Mason; Tom Rosenberg; Gary Lucchesi
- Starring: Cole Hauser; Morris Chestnut; Eddie Cibrian; Rick Ravanello; Marcel Iureș; Lena Headey; Piper Perabo
- Cinematography: Ross Emery
- Edited by: Brian Berdan
- Music by: Reinhold Heil; Johnny Klimek
- Production companies: Lakeshore Entertainment; Cinerenta
- Distributed by: Screen Gems (through Sony Pictures Releasing)
- Release date: August 26, 2005
- Running time: 97 minutes
- Country: United States
- Language: English
- Budget: $25 million
- Box office: $33.3 million

The Cave is a 2005 American monster film directed by Bruce Hunt, written by Michael Steinberg and Tegan West, produced by Lakeshore Entertainment and Cinerenta, and distributed by Screen Gems. The film stars Cole Hauser, Eddie Cibrian, Morris Chestnut, Marcel Iureș, Lena Headey, Rick Ravanello, Piper Perabo and Daniel Dae Kim. The story follows a group of cave-divers and scientists who become trapped while exploring a cave system in Romania, and encounter a pack of deadly creatures.

The film was released on August 26, 2005. It grossed $33.3 million worldwide against a budget of $30 million and received negative reviews from critics. It is frequently compared unfavorably to The Descent, a British film released in the same year proceeding from a similar premise.

== Plot ==
During the Cold War, a group of Soviet and British plunderers excavate an abandoned 13th-century abbey in the Carpathian Mountains. As they set up a dynamite charge, the floor splits beneath them and they fall into a vast cave system. They descend further to look for a way out and hear strange rattling sounds in the darkness.

In the present, a team led by Dr. Nicolai, with his associate Dr. Kathryn Jennings and cameraman Alex Kim, are excavating the site of the former abbey. They discover mysterious mosaics and an expansive river inside the cave system. Local biologists believe the cave could contain an undiscovered ecosystem, so he hires a group of divers led by brothers Jack and Tyler McAllister. The team includes professional rock climber Charlie, first scout Briggs, sonar expert Strode, and survival expert Top Buchanan.

After descending to the base of the cave, Briggs is chosen to scout ahead. While he contacts the team, he sees something in the distance, and the video crashes. Thinking the problem is an equipment malfunction, the team continues on and eventually finds Briggs downriver. However, Strode is suddenly attacked and dragged away by a large creature. This causes his water scooter to speed off and crash into the cave wall causing a rock fall, leaving them forced to follow the river and search for a new way out.

With no way out and a rescue team not scheduled to retrieve them for 12 days, Jack and Top follow the river together along the line left by Strode. Jack is then seized and scratched by one of the creatures that attacked Strode but severs its claw. Kathryn studies its cells and notices a parasitic mutation, which Nicolai has discovered in all of the cave's lifeforms. She explains that all known cave species originated above ground but have adapted over generations to life underground. Kathryn theorizes this new parasite originated in the cave environment and has never been exposed to the outside world.

The team eventually stumble across the equipment and remains of previous explorers, while continuing to descend through a series of rapids. Tyler sees Nicolai hanging onto the side of the cave, but he is sucked down into the current before he can help. As everyone starts to surface, they hear Nicolai screaming. Jack tries to save him, but he is dragged underwater. He swims deeper and watches the creature pulling Nicolai to his death, noticing tattooed letters on the creature's hands. As he regroups with the team, Jack's body begins changing as the scratches he received have infected him with the parasite. While climbing back up the cave wall to escape, Charlie is attacked and killed by a winged creature but not before stabbing its wings and setting it on fire to fall to the chasm below.

As Jack continues to mutate, Kathryn theorizes that the previous explorers and all the ecosystem's creatures mutated due to the parasite. Some of the survivors question Jack's judgement and the team splits up. Alex, Briggs, and Kathryn go their own way, while Top and Tyler stay with Jack. Jack, Top, and Tyler discover a cavern littered with human skeletons as well as a passageway out of the cave. As Tyler goes back to find the others, one of the creatures kills Briggs. Tyler regroups with Kathryn and Alex as they all run to rejoin Jack and Top. However, the creatures have entered the cavern and stolen the rebreathers necessary to navigate the passage. Top, Kathryn, Tyler, and Alex run into the river toward the passageway, but before Alex can get in the water, a creature grabs him from above, killing him. Jack sacrifices himself by causing a cave-in, allowing the others to escape.

Sometime later, Tyler and Kathryn meet up at a cafe. He asks if the mutated Jack could have survived on the surface. Kathryn says she had originally thought the parasite could only survive underground, but now believes the parasite wanted to get out. As she leaves, Tyler notices that Kathryn's eyes have mutated just like Jack's. He runs after her, but she disappears into the crowd.

== Cast ==
- Eddie Cibrian as Tyler McAllister, Jack's fellow thrill-seeking professional cave explorer and brother
- Cole Hauser as Jack McAllister, one of two thrill-seeking professional cave explorers, along with his brother Tyler
- Morris Chestnut as Top Buchanan, a survival expert
- Lena Headey as Dr. Kathryn Jennings, a scientist
- Piper Perabo as Charlie, a rock-climbing professional
- Rick Ravanello as Briggs, a member of the dive team
- Daniel Dae Kim as Alex Kim, a cameraman
- Kieran Darcy-Smith as Strode, a sonar expert
- Marcel Iureș as Dr. Nicolai, a scientist and leader of the expedition
- Vlad Rădescu as Dr. Bacovia

Brian Steele portrays the creatures in the cave.

== Production ==
In November 2003, Lakeshore Entertainment announced Cave, a horror project set to be directed by The Matrix second unit director Bruce Hunt to be distributed in North America by Screen Gems.

== Reception ==
On the review aggregator website Rotten Tomatoes, 12% of 110 critics' reviews are positive, with an average rating of 3.7/10. The website's consensus reads: "Despite its stylized and impressive sets, this horror-monster movie mish-mash suffers from endless cliches and wildly implausible plotlines." Metacritic, which uses a weighted average, assigned the film a score of 30 out of 100, based on 24 critics, indicating "generally unfavorable" reviews. Audiences polled by CinemaScore gave the film an average grade "C−" on an A+ to F scale.

The main complaint was the lack of character building and overly familiar cliches, with Neil Smith of BBC Online calling it "a generic duffer that is as exciting as a hole in the ground". Robert Koehler made the same observation in Variety, writing, "The Cave feels familiar as it goes through the rote edicts of the scientific crew vs. beastie formula". In her review for The New York Times, Laura Kern praised the film’s sets and visual style, but criticized the script as weak, writing "Having worked as second- and third-unit director on the Matrix trilogy and Dark City, Bruce Hunt is no stranger to inspired and stylish productions. But whereas those films managed to inject new life into tired territory, The Cave, his first effort as director, fails to generate anything resembling innovation." Judy Chia Hui Hsu wrote in The Seattle Times, "the serenity of the largely aquatic underground world framed by majestic stalagmites and serpentine corridors succeeds in capturing the moviegoer’s attention," but added, "The insipid dialog lacks even a hint of comic relief, so the audience is grateful when the action quickly kicks into gear," and "one of the film’s biggest letdowns is that the vicious beast, seen in the full light of the final scenes, is not such a surprise after all. The creature is simply an amalgamation of monsters we’ve seen before". Teresa Wiltz for The Washington Post was more direct, commenting ""The Cave" isn't just a bad movie, it's a very, very, very bad movie, so bad that it can't even redeem itself by turning into high camp."

== Box office ==
In the US, the film opened ranked #5 grossing $6,147,294 at 2,195 sites, averaging $2,800. It went on to have a final US gross of $15,007,991. In Australia, it opened at 89 sites, averaging A$3,204 grossing A$285,121. It had a second-weekend decrease by 74%, and had a finishing gross of A$570,131. Worldwide, the film has grossed $33,296,457.

== Soundtrack ==
Two soundtrack CDs were released on August 26, 2005 by Lakeshore Records, one with the score by the film's composers Reinhold Heil and Johnny Klimek and the other one which features tracks by heavy metal bands including Atreyu, Lacuna Coil, Diecast, Burning Brides, Ill Niño, Killswitch Engage, Shadows Fall, It Dies Today, Trivium, Mastodon and more. Also, the single Nemo by Nightwish is featured during the end credits of the film.

== See also ==
- The Descent, a 2005 British film with the same premise
- The Cavern, a third similar film released in 2005
