= Pavor Nocturnus (Sanctuary) =

- Sanctuary episode
- One of the "zombies" of the episode, revealing some kind of stinger, about to infect Helen Magnus moments before she is saved.
- Episode no.: Season 2 Episode 5
- Directed by: Brenton Spencer
- Written by: Damian Kindler & James Thorpe
- Original air date: November 6, 2009
- Running time: 45 minutes

Guest appearances
- Nicole Muñoz as Jessica Mitchell; Sean Tyson as Simmons; Darren Shahlavi as Jason

Episode chronology
← Previous "Hero"	Next → "Fragments"

"Pavor Nocturnus" is the fifth episode of the second season of Canadian television series Sanctuary, and is the 18th episode overall. The episode first aired on Syfy in the United States on November 6, 2009. It was written by Damian Kindler and James Thorpe, and was directed by Brenton Spencer. In the episode, Helen Magnus (Amanda Tapping) awakens in a future where Earth is devastated by a plague that turned all but a handful of the human population into savage zombie-like creatures.

The idea behind "Pavor Nocturnus" came after Damian Kindler saw the film I Am Legend, and wanted to show a "what if" scenario, showing Magnus' work going "horribly wrong". To give the practical sets a more post-apocalyptic feel, the production crew added several wrecked cars and several bags full of dead leaves. The episode was viewed by 1.4 million Americans after its original broadcast, a drop from the previous episode, and received generally mixed reviews, though one reviewer believed this to be a standout episode of the second season. It was nominated for a total of six awards; one Constellation Award and five Leo Awards, winning three.

== Plot ==
Helen Magnus awakens in a dilapidated corridor in the Sanctuary and finds that both the building, and the surrounding city skyline lie in ruins; Magnus has no memory on how the devastation occurred. While venturing the streets, Magnus finds herself under attack by a savage humanoid creature, but is saved by two men in Hazmat suits, who proceed to capture and decontaminate her. Magnus is later shocked to discover that her protégé, Will Zimmerman (Robin Dunne), is the leader of the survivalist group. Unlike his original personality, Zimmerman is acting far more violent and aggressive, and believes Magnus to be an imposter, citing she died three years ago. As more creatures attack the base, Magnus escapes and returns to the Sanctuary, where on the way she is joined by a young girl, Jessica Mitchell (Nicole Muñoz).

Zimmerman returns to the Sanctuary also after his unit are killed by the attacks. Now believing Magnus is who she says she is, Zimmerman recounts the events of the plague to her; ten years ago, a contagion was released in Old City, transforming humans to cannibalistic creatures. When containing the city failed, the disease spread throughout the globe and despite her best efforts, Magnus could not find a cure and was eventually killed in Buenos Aires. Several world governments deployed nuclear weapons in an attempt to stop the threat until they fell. All Sanctuary personnel apart from Zimmerman were killed in the process. Only around 100,000 unaffected humans remain in colonies in the Arctic and remote islands. Jessica is revealed to be infected and alerts the creatures to the Sanctuary after she transforms, forcing Zimmerman to kill her. Both Magnus and Zimmerman fortify one section of the Sanctuary so Magnus can learn, via computer files, how the plague started. Zimmerman is revealed to have been infected during his last skirmish, and sacrifices himself to buy Magnus more time.

Magnus realises that before the outbreak began, she was on a mission in Honduras; tired of losing people she loved, most recently daughter Ashley, she was researching for a way to "cure" her immortality. She found out about a Mayan elixir, which allows immortals to age at a normal rate. But by taking the vial she also inadvertently released the contagion (it is also believed the elixir was responsible for the fall of the Mayan civilisation). Before she can die at the hands of the creatures, she is sent back to the same moment she discovered the vial by an incorporeal Abnormal (called a "sentient mist" by the producers); the Abnormal is revealed to be a guardian of the vial and transported Magnus to the future to show her the potential consequences of her actions. She leaves the vial behind and returns to the Sanctuary.

== Production ==
=== Conception and writing ===
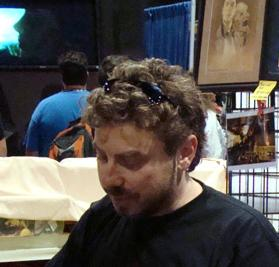
Writer Damian Kindler came up with the idea for the episode after watching the 2007 film, I Am Legend, and wanted to create a Sanctuary-esque story behind it.

The idea behind "Pavor Nocturnus" came before production started on the second season. Damian Kindler wanted to write a "what if" scenario to the viewers, showing Magnus' work going "horribly wrong". Kindler once saw I Am Legend, and practically wanted to "rip it off" with a Sanctuary-esque story behind it. It was written to be more about Magnus and Zimmerman than the "zombies;" by doing the opposite—the episode being more about the zombies and Magnus spending most of the episode finding a cure—it would not be as interesting. Kindler ran out of time to allow the episode to move at the correct pace, and asked James Thorpe to co-write it with him; out of the five acts, Thorpe wrote the first two acts, while Kindler wrote the remaining three. Kindler liked Thorpe's contribution towards the episode for including much of the imagination and ideas towards it.

In one scene, Zimmerman says the line "let's do the time warp again", a reference to the song "Time Warp" from The Rocky Horror Picture Show. In regards to Zimmerman's fate during his last fight against the zombies, Kindler originally wanted Zimmerman to "suicide bomb" himself, but later chose to have his death unseen. The ending, where Magnus is transported from the post-apocalyptic future to the present, was written in a way that Kindler wanted the audience to discuss whether it was a case of time travel or merely a "psychological dream." The scene between Magnus and Zimmerman after her return at the very end of the episode was originally meant to be light hearted, but toned this down somewhat as the producers felt that doing so would betray the audience, though they decided Zimmerman was allowed to have a playful attitude, since he did not see the dystopia Magnus saw.

In the end, it took Kindler and Thorpe seven days to write the episode, a relatively quick time for writing a Sanctuary episode. Because of the horror element of the episode, including the "horrible" fate of Jessica Mitchell, "Pavor Nocturnus" was the first episode in the first two seasons Damian Kindler truly felt was not suitable for children. Also because of this, and the inclusion of an "assault" of a naked woman, considered taboo by the producers, Kindler did not want to include those scenes in any future episodes.

=== Filming and music ===
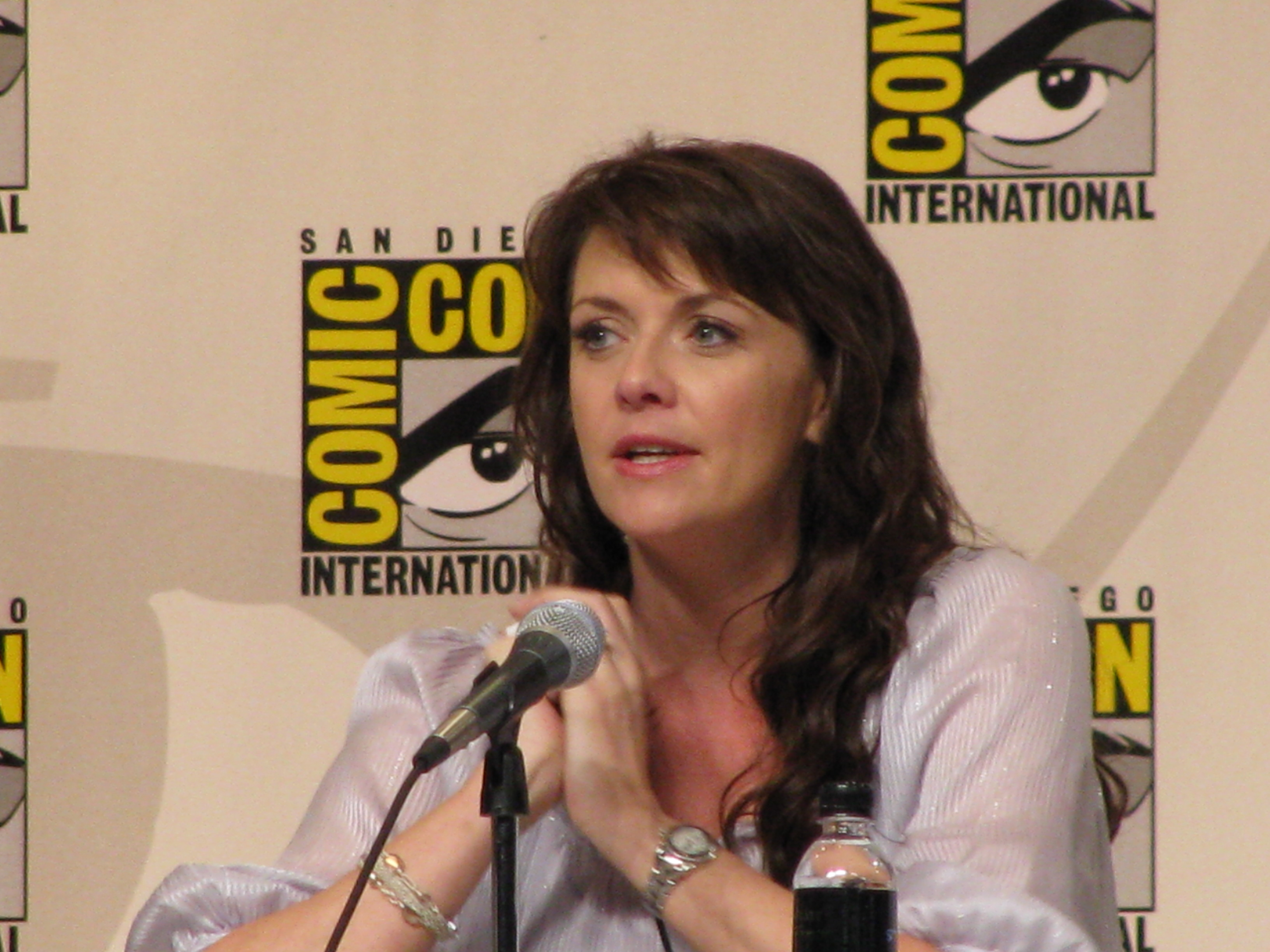
Amanda Tapping played a scene where she had to strip and be hosed down with water; she described the scene as the hardest she ever performed in her acting career.

The majority of the episode was filmed in black-and-white. Half of it was filmed using green screen, while the other half was filmed using practical sets in Studio One at The Bridge Studios in Burnaby, British Columbia. One of the sets included the dilapidated city streets. The production crew purposely "destroyed" the street set, by placing several wrecked cars and emptied several bags full of dead leaves, then later created artificial rain and use several fans to simulate wind; this gave the sets more of a post-apocalyptic feel. Doing so also made the floors very slippery for the cast. Being primarily a Magnus-focused episode, actress Amanda Tapping spent most of the seven filming days cold and wet.

The scene where Tapping had to strip and be hosed down with water was the hardest sequence Tapping had filmed in her entire acting career; Tapping "bawled [her] eyes out" between takes. Shooting the sequence was also hard on the crew who were present on set. Because the producers believe the audience could misconstrued the scene as Magnus being raped, before shooting the sequence Tapping asked director Brenton Spencer not to make it sexual in any way. The two stunt actors who hosed her with water were the same stunt actors Tapping worked with for years during her tenure on Stargate SG-1; Tapping chose the actors because of her trust with them. The scene, written by James Thorpe, was initially considered to be cut by Kindler as soon as the script was completed; Kindler was against the idea, but eventually decided to keep it, realising it would be a harrowing moment for Magnus.

Robin Dunne altered his appearance for a more "post-apocalyptic warrior look." This included the addition of scars, a "funky eye" contact lens, and a mullet, which Kindler believed was "ubiquitous" for the look. Tapping noted that seeing Zimmerman's altered appearance for the first time "creeped [her] out." She also stated that while Dunne played the darker version of Zimmerman, she felt there were times he "really wanted to punch [her] in the face." Martin Wood believed Dunne did "an amazing job" playing the most unlike Zimmerman. Throughout filming, Dunne and Tapping performed their own stunts. The episode became one of the most expensive in the series, partially due to the rather extensive use of prosthetic makeup. The destroyed city skyline was in fact a painting made by the production designers. Andrew Lockington composed the score of the episode. Damian Kindler was receptive towards Lockington's work, stating that he "sustains this very very heavy tone, and he keeps it there."

== Reception ==
Sanctuary depends on such audience indulgence to a certain extent. Without our willingness to turn a blind eye now and then, its charms would be utterly lost. But "Pavor Nocturnus" pushes that equation a few steps past the line, where the silliness evokes enough discomfort to merit turning away. One can easily forgive the show, of course even at its nadir, it's just too harmless to hate, and as a one-off riff, it could be worse.

— Rob Vaux

A drop of almost 200,000 viewers from the previous episode, "Hero", "Pavor Nocturnus" was viewed by 1.420 million Americans, making Sanctuary the sixth most seen series from Syfy the week it aired, and was the second highest viewing the day it aired, behind Stargate Universe.

Critical reaction towards the episode were mixed. Rob Vaux of Mania.com graded it a C+; Vaux said that the "we've seen [the Zombie apocalypse] scenario too many times before." Vaux noted the "plenty of House of the Dead-style kung fu", but felt Tapping did not "have that Bruce Lee vibe." Dunne's portrayal received a mixed response, stating "the script doesn't give him much to do besides bark out exposition and snarl with hatred at the faceless enemy," though he and Tapping did "succeed in evoking an entire end-of-the-world scenario with just a few terse lines of dialogue." In review of the first and second season releases on Blu-ray Disc, Michael Simpson of CinemaSpy named the episode "Sanctuary's take on I Am Legend", but thought the plot was "derivative". However, from a visual effects stand point, Simpson called the episode a "highlight of the second season", adding "the post-apocalyptic world created by the effects team at Anthem is worthy of a motion picture and together with the gritty production design looks disturbingly real". In review of the second season, David Blackwell of Enterline Media named "Pavor Nocturnus" as a standout episode, along with "Veritas" and "Haunted".

In total, the episode received six award nominations; one Constellation Award, and five Leo Awards. Robin Dunne was nominated for a Constellation Award for "Best Male Performance in a 2009 Science Fiction Television Episode" for his portrayal as Will Zimmerman in the episode, but narrowly lost out to David Tennant from the Doctor Who episode "The Waters of Mars". However, Dunne did win the "Best Lead Performance by a Male in a Dramatic Series" in the 2010 Leo Awards. Director Brenton Spencer also won "Best Direction in a Dramatic Series", while Christina McQuarrie won "Best Costume Design in a Dramatic Series" for their roles in the episode. Make-up artists Francesca von Zimmermann and Andrea Manchur were nominated for "Best Make-Up in a Dramatic Series", but lost out to another team from "Fragments", another Sanctuary episode. Amanda Tapping was nominated for "Best Lead Performance by a Female in a Dramatic Series", but lost to Erin Karpluk from Being Erica.
