= Riverview Rural High School =

School in Nova Scotia, Canada

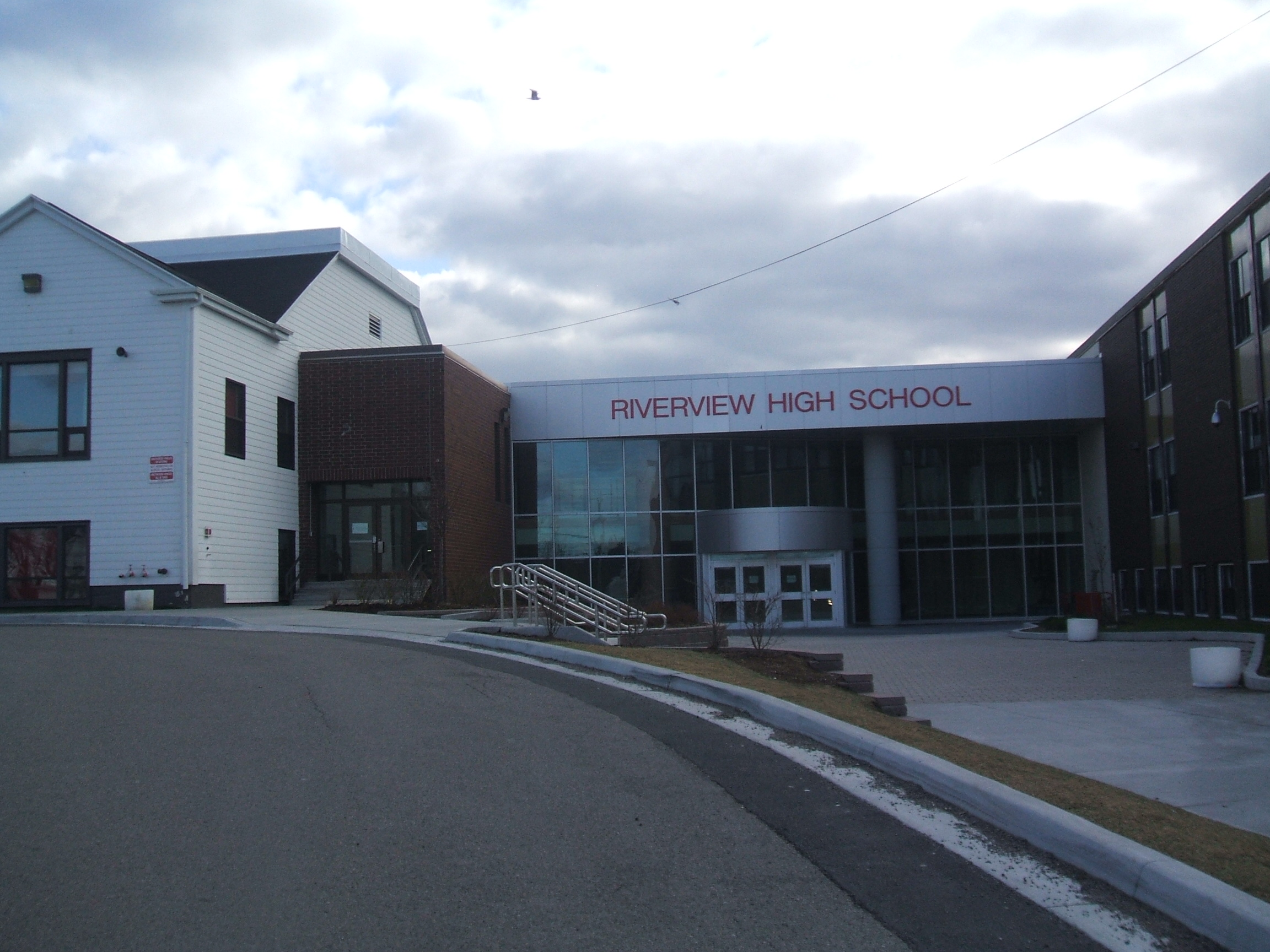

Location
- 57 Coxheath Road; Coxheath, Nova Scotia, B1R 1R4; Canada; 46°6′59.62″N 60°15′2.05″W

Information
- School type: Secondary
- Founded: 1950
- School board: Cape Breton – Victoria Regional Centre for Education
- Principal: Marlene Urquhart
- Grades: 9-12
- Enrollment: 1000 (approximate)
- Language: English
- Area: Coxheath, Sydney River
- Colours: Red and White
- Team name: Ravens (formerly Redmen/Royals until 2020)
- Website: cbvrce.ca/rv/

Riverview Rural High School is a secondary school located in Coxheath, Nova Scotia, Canada, a suburb of Sydney, Nova Scotia. It is attended by approximately 1000 students in grades 9 to 12. The school falls under the jurisdiction of the Cape Breton – Victoria Regional Centre for Education, and is one of the two main high schools in the region, along with Sydney Academy. Red and white are the school's colours.

== History ==
First opening in August 1950, Riverview Rural High School was built on the former site of the Keefe farm in Coxheath, and overlooks Sydney River, from which its name is derived. The annex building was added in 1951–52 to deal with a serious overcrowding problem. The business building was added in 1969 and the gymnasium and science labs were constructed in the 1980s. A new entrance was completed in 2007, with additional plans for a new library, computer labs, art room, and science labs in the coming years. Declining enrollment numbers led to the high school's annex building being demolished in 2012 and replaced by an employee parking lot.

Riverview's first principal was H. H. Wetmore, and its longest-serving principal was Robert MacKenzie, who served as principal for 30 years. Riverview offers French Immersion Certificates, Advance Certificate Programs, university preparatory, honours level courses, business and high school graduation courses.

== Administration ==
- Principal: Marlene Urquhart

== Notable alumni ==
- David Dingwall (Class of 1970) - former federal MP Liberal cabinet minister
- Craig Ferguson (Class of 1988) - former professional hockey player
- Michael Forgeron (Class of 1984) - retired rower, gold medalist, men's eights, 1992 Olympics
- Rick Ravanello - actor
- Gordie Sampson - musician, Grammy Award-winning songwriter
