= Harvey Richardson =

Canadian ice hockey player

- Born: April 5, 1885; Sydney, Nova Scotia, Canada
- Died: December 30, 1946 (aged 61); Coxheath, Nova Scotia, Canada
- Height: 5 ft 7 in (170 cm)
- Weight: 152 lb (69 kg; 10 st 12 lb)
- Position: Centre
- Played for: Quebec Bulldogs
- Playing career: 1904–1915

Harvey Richardson (April 5, 1885 – December 30, 1946) was a Canadian professional ice hockey player. He played with the Quebec Bulldogs of the National Hockey Association.
