= Empath (disambiguation) =

An empath is someone who claims paranormal powers in reading and feeling others' emotions.

Empath may also refer to:

- Empath, someone with high empathy.
- Empath (album), by Devin Townsend, 2019
- Empath (band), an American noise punk band
- Empath (character), a fictional mutant in the Marvel universe
- "The Empath", an episode of Star Trek: The Original Series

== See also ==
- Empathy (disambiguation)
