= Linguistic empathy =

Linguistic empathy in theoretical linguistics is the "point of view" in an anaphoric utterance by which a participant is bound with or in the event or state that they describe in that sentence.

An example is found with the Japanese verbs yaru and kureru. These both share the same essential meaning and case frame. But they differ in that yaru expresses when the action is looked at from the point of view of the referent of the subject or the neutral (objective) point of view, whereas kureru is used when the event is described from the point of view of the referent of the dative object.

While present in many languages, including English, it is particularly prominent in some, such as Japanese.

The concept has no connection with empathy in terms of attributing mental states to others or sympathizing with their situation.

== The phenomena ==
The basic idea of linguistic empathy is that sentences can provide information about the speaker's point of view, from which they describe a state of affairs. This information can be expressed as concerning the speaker's identification with a participant", "camera angle", and "point of view".

For example, in English, "then John hit his brother" is more acceptable than "then John's brother was hit by him". The former shows the speaker's empathy with John is greater than with his brother (John's brother). In contrast, in the latter, John's brother is the subject and him (John) is the by-agent. Thus, since the speaker's empathy with the subject, John's brother, is less than with him (John), then John's brother was hit by him is less acceptable than the former phrase.
