= Kinesthetic sympathy =

Emotional attachment to an object

Kinesthetic sympathy is the state of having an emotional attachment to an object when it is in hand which one does not have when it is out of sight.

== Concept ==
The concept of kinesthetic sympathy is associated with John Martin, a dance critic. He introduced it in a New York Times article that discussed how the audience members respond to movements of the dancers on stage. Such response is said to transpire subconsciously. According to Martin, "when we see a human body moving, we see movement which is potentially producible by any human body and therefore by our own." This link allows humans to reproduce the movement in their present muscular experience and even awaken its connotations as if the perceived movement was their own. What this means is that an individual - through kinesthetic sympathy - could perform movements that are beyond his body's capacities.

Kinesthetic sympathy is linked to the concept of kinesthetic empathy, which pertains to the embodied experience of movement emotion.

== NSGCD study ==
In 2003, a study was conducted by the National Study Group On Chronic Disorganization (NSGCD), the purpose of which was to collect data on the effectiveness of using special techniques with clients to avoid kinesthetic sympathy. Organizers working with chronically disorganized clients at their desks were asked to use the kinesthetic sympathy avoidance process by asking their respective clients to hold a mug, drinking glass, or plastic or metal tumbler as a distracting device while working together. The survey was meant to see if, by holding a solid "distraction" item, the client would exhibit less noticeable kinetic sympathy and, therefore, have a more successful paper processing session. The survey achieved mixed results.

== See also ==
- Behaviorism
- Kinesthetic learning
- Professional organizing
- Stimulus control
