= Witness Insecurity (film) =

Absolute Killers
- Festival release poster
- Directed by: Heather Hale
- Written by: Eric Troyer; Heather Hale
- Based on: Insecurity; 2006 novel by Eric Troyer
- Produced by: Heather Hale
- Starring: Edward Furlong; Meat Loaf; Ed Asner; Brian Krause; Grace Johnston; Rick Ravanello
- Cinematography: Jim Orr
- Edited by: Jochen Kunstler
- Music by: Stephen C. Marston
- Production companies: Heather Hale Productions and Cascade Pictures; Witness Insecurity
- Distributed by: TriCoast
- Release dates: October 1, 2011 (Modern Film Fest); March 16, 2012 (United States)
- Country: United States
- Language: English

Absolute Killers, also known as Witness Insecurity and Snitch, is a 2011 American thriller film directed, produced and co-written by Heather Hale. The script was based on the self-published novel Insecurity written by Eric Troyer, who co-wrote the script. The film stars Edward Furlong, Grace Johnston, Rick Ravanello, Brian Krause, Meat Loaf and Ed Asner. The film had its festival premiere October 1, 2011, under its working title of Witness Insecurity, its theatrical release March 16, 2012, under its original distribution title of Snitch and was marketed by two different distributors at the American Film Market and Marché du Film (i.e.: the Cannes Film Market) and was subsequently sold via retail at outlets such as Walmart and Best Buy.

== Synopsis ==
The story centers around Johnny Graham (Edward Furlong), who was raised by the Torino crime family after his parents' suspicious death. Struggling between loyalty to his adoptive family versus his conscience, he is forced to act when Anthony Torino (Rick Ravanello) sets his murderous focus on D.A. Elizabeth Jones (Grace Johnston), who is prosecuting Anthony for the gruesome murder of his cousin. Though Johnny is the family accountant, he is an excellent marksman. Scrambling to stall to save her, Johnny persuades a hesitant Anthony to let him make the hit to eliminate the D.A. (when in actuality, Johnny only wants to warn her). His ill-planned ruse is ruined when the Torino family hit-man and Johnny's longtime friend, Vince (Brian Krause) and Chuck Thomas (Bill Burns) are sent to ensure the success of Johnny's first hit. The ensuing shootout leaves Elizabeth wounded, Chuck dead and Johnny arrested. Johnny's conscience overtakes him. When he confesses - giving up only Anthony - he is entered into the Federal Witness Protection Program. Anthony is apprehended but escapes thanks to a mole who reveals the locations of Johnny and the others who were set to testify against him in trial. Vince finds Johnny miserably hiding out on a rural farm. As Johnny scrambles to protect himself, the DA and the other witnesses from Anthony, he realizes he is not alone on His mission.

== Cast ==
- Edward Furlong as Johnny
- Grace Johnston as Elizabeth
- Rick Ravanello as Anthony
- Brian Krause as Vince
- Meat Loaf as Dan Sloan (as Meat Loaf Aday)
- Elaine Hendrix as Susan
- Ed Asner as Max
- Rena Owen as Judge Irwin
- P.J. Byrne as Perry
- Daz Crawford as Phil
- Billy Burns as Chuck Thomas
- John Bobek as Matt
- Diana Sayers as Gilda
- Camellia Rahbary as Angela
- Charles Austin Moore II as Julian
- Patrick G. Keenan as Frank
- Brian Gregorie as Wayne
- Donald James Moore as Mike
- Ryan Sawtelle as Detective Regan
- Davis Osborne as Brian

== Production ==
Helmed by director Heather Hale, the 18-day shoot began in May 2010 under its working title of Witness Insecurity (aka Snitch). Principal photography was primarily executed in China Grove, North Carolina but included locations in Lexington, Salisbury and Charlotte and concluded in June.

== Release ==
The film premiered as Witness Insecurity on October 1, 2011, at the Modern Film Fest in Kannapolis, North Carolina, with some of the filmmakers and local actors in attendance for a discussion panel. The film had theatrical release on March 16, 2012, under its distribution title of Snitch and was subsequently sold at retail outlets such as Walmart and Best Buy.
