= Moebius (Stargate SG-1) =

- Stargate SG-1 episodes
- Episode nos.: Season 8 Episodes 19 & 20
- Directed by: Peter DeLuise
- Written by: Brad Wright; Robert C. Cooper; Joseph Mallozzi; Paul Mullie
- Production codes: 819 and 820
- Original air dates: February 15, 2005; February 22, 2005

Guest appearances
- Don S. Davis as George Hammond; David Hewlett as Dr. Rodney McKay; Colin Cunningham as Major Davis; Robert Wisden as Major Samuels; Georgia Craig as Sabrina Gosling; Alessandro Juliani as Katep; Peter Williams as Apophis; Jay Acovone as Major Charles Kawalsky; Sina Najafi as Egyptian boy

Episode chronology
← Previous "Threads"	Next → "Avalon"
- Stargate SG-1 (season 8)

"Moebius" is the two-part season finale for season eight of the Canadian-American military science fiction television series Stargate SG-1. The episodes were written by Joseph Mallozzi, Paul Mullie, Executive producers Brad Wright and Robert C. Cooper, the episodes were directed by Peter DeLuise. The episodes were the strongest episodes in the eighth season on the Nielsen household ratings with fellow Stargate SG-1 episode "New Order". The episode earned positive reviews from major media publishers worldwide.

"Moebius" is about the discovery of a Zero Point Module (ZPM) by SG-1. The only problem is that it was taken by Ra after the Earth revolt more than five thousand years prior. The team decides to travel back in time to get the ZPM and leave without changing history (based on the fact that Ra and company were most likely unaware of the ZPM's purpose), but they are unable to travel back to present time so they record a video for the United States government to find. In the alternate timeline, the government find the tape and subsequently the Stargate in Antarctica and decide to establish the Stargate Program but not to restore the original timeline.

== Plot overview ==
=== Part 1 ===
Samantha "Sam" Carter reveals the existence of the Daedalus: a new Earth-built battlecruiser which is capable of reaching the Pegasus Galaxy and is larger and more advanced than the Prometheus. Daniel Jackson learns of Catherine Langford's death and, after her funeral, receives Catherine's collection of documents and artifacts relating to the Stargate program. From one book in the collection, Daniel learns of the former location of a Zero Point Module (ZPM) in Ancient Egypt. Daniel and Carter persuade Jack O'Neill to use the time travel capabilities of the Puddle Jumper they found to travel back and take the ZPM, assuming that Ra never knew of its purpose.

Once they arrive in 3000 B.C., they join in an offering to Ra and witness his cold-blooded murder of an Egyptian making the offering. Teal'c disguises himself as a Horus Jaffa and retrieves the ZPM from Ra's treasury. However, Ra's Jaffa discover the cloaked Jumper after a sandstorm covers it in sand. Unwilling to upset the future by fighting the Jaffa to get the Jumper back, SG-1 decides to live out the rest of their lives in the past, knowing that the rebellion that overthrew Ra will eventually happen. However, an alternate timeline is created in which the Stargate was never discovered and everything SG-1 have done for the last eight years never happened.

In this timeline, alternate Daniel is teaching English as a second language, alternate Carter spends her time double-checking other scientists' work, alternate O'Neill is retired from the military and alternate Teal'c is still the First Prime of Apophis. Alternate Daniel and alternate Carter are contacted by the Air Force and brought to Cheyenne Mountain.

At Cheyenne Mountain, George Hammond informs alternate Carter and alternate Daniel that archaeologists found a video camera in a vacuum-sealed canopic jar at a dig in Giza. The video contains a recording of the original SG-1, explaining who they are and what they were doing, as well as a number of things that are true in their timeline, such as recent political events, Presidents and personal details. Their plan is that if things have changed in the future, then SG-1's alternative selves will travel back in time and fix the past.

An expedition team is sent to find the Giza Stargate, but find nothing. Instead, they discover that the original Daniel left a tablet where the gate should have been, inscribed with an obscure dialect of Egyptian that only alternate Daniel can read. It reveals that the original SG-1 instigated a successful rebellion against the Ra of 3000 BC that caused him to leave Earth with the Stargate. However, they do find the Puddle Jumper, and alternate Daniel and alternate Carter figure out how to find the Antarctic Stargate. A team is assembled to go through the Stargate to recruit alternate Teal'c under the instruction of the Daniel and Carter on the tape. Alternate Daniel and alternate Carter are not going to be on this team.

=== Part 2 ===
The scientists working on the recovered Alternate-Puddle Jumper cannot make it work because they do not have the ATA gene. Alternate-O'Neill is called in to operate the Jumper and lead the team through the Stargate to find alternate Teal'c, and agrees that alternate Daniel and alternate Carter are to join the team through the Stargate.

On Chulak, SG-1 are caught by Jaffa loyal to Apophis and imprisoned. Alternate Teal'c defects to their cause and helps them escape but alternate Daniel was made a Goa'uld spy by Apophis and is killed by Teal'c. They escape in the Puddle Jumper, but are chased and damaged by Death Gliders. Unaware of the jumper's cloaking capacity, they believe that only way they can survive is to time-travel. They travel back to 3000 B.C. and use the Stargate to pass from Chulak to Ancient Egypt where the original versions of SG-1 were stranded and where Ra is still alive and ruling.

The original SG-1 attempted the rebellion because O'Neill and Teal'c did not want to stay and O'Neill, Carter and Teal'c were killed when it failed. Daniel, the only survivor, meets with alternate Carter, alternate O'Neill and alternate Teal'c. He has not yet made the tablet detailing the second successful rebellion attempt because it hasn't happened yet. This means that his current plans with the underground of the local populace are destined to succeed. However, they lead to the Stargate being removed from Earth by Ra. The plan is to instigate the rebellion, thus diverting Ra's attention, and secure the Stargate to where it was originally buried, allowing the original timeline to evolve as it did.

The rebellion ultimately succeeds, but not before alternate Carter and alternate-O'Neill show their feelings for each other with a kiss, uncertain if they will survive. Ra's Jaffa surrender, outnumbered by the staff- and zat-armed Egyptians. The alternate SG-1 bury the videotape, along with the ZPM, for the SG-1 of the future to find. The alternate-SG-1 and Daniel from the original SG-1 (of 3000 BC) live out the rest of their lives in Ancient Egypt.

The original SG-1 of the present day receive the videotape and the ZPM left for them a few weeks before they were to go back in time. As the timeline has been restored, they have no reason to go back in time, and they've gained a ZPM free of charge. The episode ends with SG-1 at O'Neill's cabin, fishing, in a scene identical to the end of "Threads", except there are now fish in Jack's pond.

== Production ==
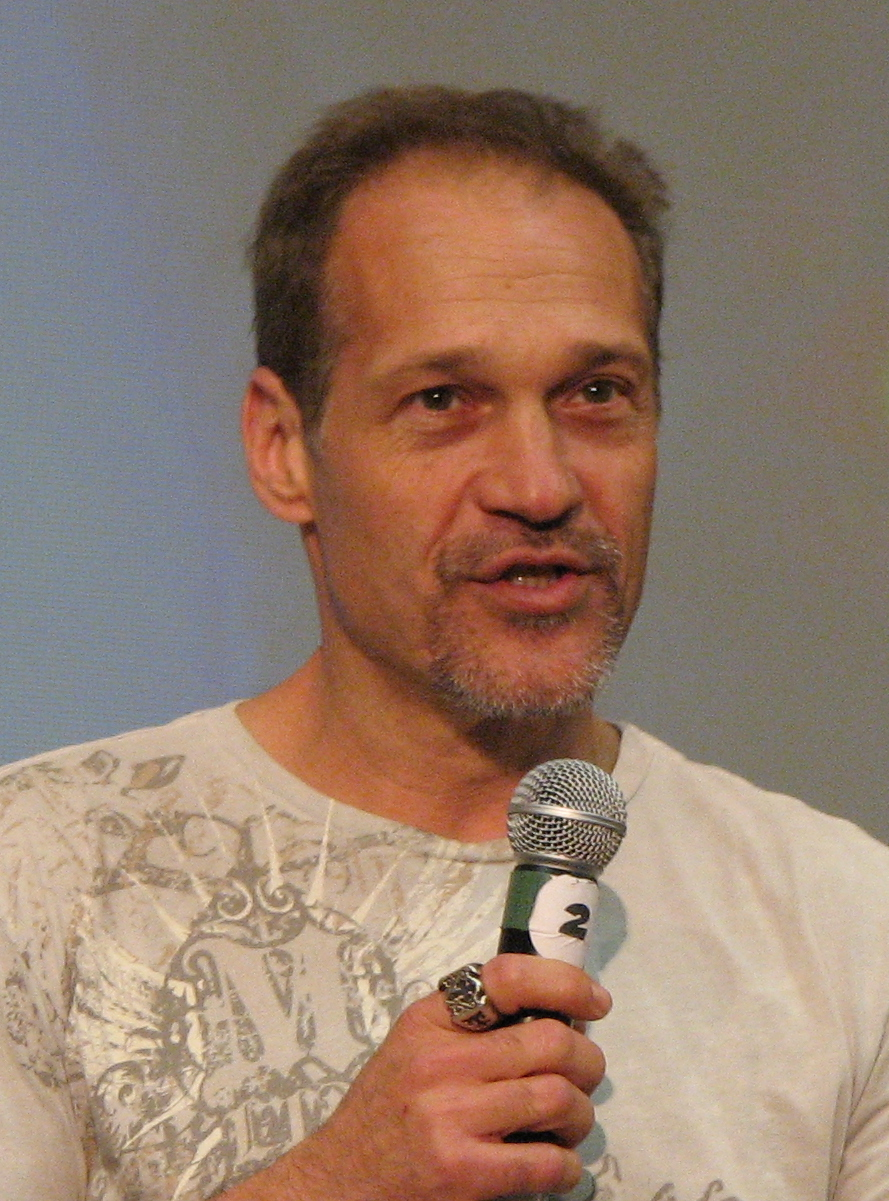
Jay Acovone's character Charles Kawalsky re-emerged after dying in "The Enemy Within"

After production wrapped on season seven, the writers came together and pitched out ideas for the eighth and presumably final season. Season five through season seven had previously been expected to be the last, but the show got renewed each year. They ultimately agreed on about ten initial episodes, two of which should make a two-hour premiere to address left-open issues of the season seven finale. Stargate SG-1 was originally set to be replaced with a new series entitled Stargate Command, but the Sci Fi Channel decided to renew the series for another season.

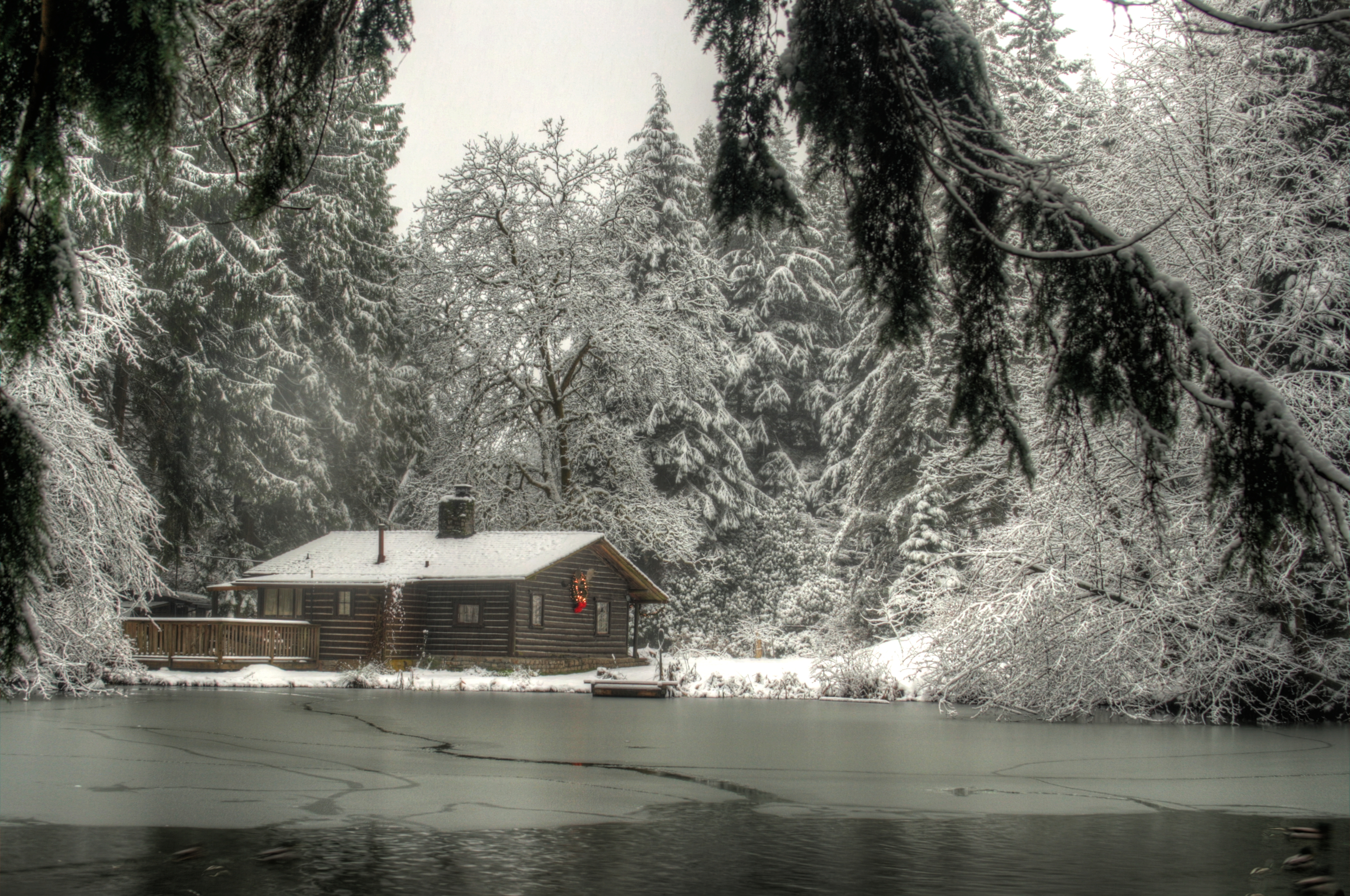
Filming the final scene where SG-1 goes fishing took place at the Caretakers Cottage, Murdo Frazer Park in North Vancouver.

O'Neill's last line in "Moebius", "Close enough" is a homage to The Simpsons episode "Treehouse of Horror V" that involves Homer Simpson time traveling and unintentionally making numerous changes to history; upon returning to a timeline where his family has snake tongues but everything else is otherwise normal, he says "eh, close enough". In the same SG-1 episode, the name of O'Neill's boat is "Homer". This is one of several references to The Simpsons on Stargate SG-1, all centered around O'Neill. (However, Carter's line "I keep thinking I'm gonna step on a bug and change the future," may be taken as a reference to The Simpsons, as Homer's stepping on a bug is what caused the changes in his universe. Alternatively, this line could be a reference to Ray Bradbury's A Sound of Thunder, the original science fiction story that involved changes in a timeline caused by stepping on an insect, which influenced the Simpsons episode.) Incidentally, in the brief shot of O'Neill boat showing the name, the font used is the same font used extensively in The Simpsons.

"Moebius" was supposed to be the Stargate SG-1 series finale (like the two previous season finales), so many actors reprised their roles from past episodes: Don S. Davis as George Hammond, Peter Williams as Apophis, Colin Cunningham as Major Davis, and Jay Acovone as Charles Kawalsky. This is the last episode to feature Richard Dean Anderson character Brigadier General Jonathan "Jack" O'Neill as a main cast member of Stargate SG-1. The episode also marks the final appearances of recurring characters Charles Kawalsky, Apophis and Major Davis (who would re-appear in Stargate Atlantis series finale "Enemy at the Gate" (2009)). Alessandro Juliani (Katep) previously played Eliam in the Season 4 episode "Scorched Earth". This episode marks Ra's only appearance outside of the feature film and Stargate: Continuum.

== Reception ==
"Moebius" earned a Nielsen household rating of 4.7, part one earned 2.3 and part two earned 2.4 in Nielsen household ratings. Christine Mooney won a Leo Award in the category "Dramatic Series - Best Costume Design" for "Moebius" (Part 2). Dan Houston from Digitally Obsessed said the episode was a "Must-see" for "Fans" of Stargate SG-1. Holly E. Ordway from DVDTalk said the episodes "story" was "entertaining" and "interesting" and different from the previous episodes in the franchise.
