= Stargate SG-1 season 6 =

Season of television series

Stargate SG-1
- Season 6
- DVD cover
- Starring: Richard Dean Anderson; Amanda Tapping; Christopher Judge; Corin Nemec; Don S. Davis
- No. of episodes: 22

Release
- Original network: Syfy
- Original release: June 7, 2002 – February 19, 2003

Season chronology
- ← Previous; Season 5 Next → Season 7

The sixth season of Stargate SG-1, an American-Canadian television series, began airing on June 7, 2002 on Sci Fi. The sixth season concluded after 22 episodes on February 19, 2003 on the UK's Sky One, which had overtaken the Sci-Fi Channel's number of new-episode broadcasts mid-season. The series was developed by Brad Wright and Jonathan Glassner. Season six regular cast members include Richard Dean Anderson, Amanda Tapping, Christopher Judge, with Corin Nemec, and Don S. Davis.

== Production ==
"Redemption" features a brand new opening sequence, with various shots of the gate spinning, and Michael Shanks' name being removed to make way for Corin Nemec's in between Christopher Judge and Don S. Davis. The following episode, "Descent", has a different title sequence.

In most of the shots in "Abyss" where Ba'al is talking to O'Neill, Cliff Simon is actually talking to a stand-in for O'Neill and not Richard Dean Anderson due to the limited time Richard Dean Anderson had in which to film the episode. A series of three different sets were used to represent the cells; a horizontal cell, a vertical cell and a pivoting cell for the scenes in which the chamber is seen rotating. A blend of shots filmed in all three sets was used each time O'Neill is retrieved from or returned to his cell.

"Shadowplay" was written as an homage to John Nash, see A Beautiful Mind.

Most of "Paradise Lost" was shot at Pitt Lake, near Vancouver.

"Disclosure" is the third clip show within Stargate SG-1, with the first being "Politics" and the second being "Out of Mind". None of the regular characters except General Hammond are featured.

"The Changeling" was written by Christopher Judge, who plays Teal'c. The parts of the episode where Teal'c is a human take place in Coquitlam, which is a city in the Greater Vancouver Regional District. (Vancouver, the city where Stargate SG-1 is filmed, is also part of this district.)

"Full Circle" is the last episode to feature Corin Nemec as a main cast member. It is also the last episode where Skaara (Alexis Cruz) appears.

"The Other Guys" features several Star Trek references: John Billingsley (Doctor Phlox in Star Trek: Enterprise) plays the part of a scientist named Coombs (reference to actor Jeffrey Combs, a regular on various Star Trek series), one of the actors refers to the "Roddenberry spirit", and a Klingon Bat'leth is mounted on the wall behind the throne of Khonsu of Amon Shek.

== Release ==
Upon its initial airing, "Prometheus" became the Sci Fi channel's highest rated one-hour episode of a series, earning a 2.0 household Nielsen rating.

"Redemption, Part 2" was nominated for a Gemini Award in the category "Best Visual Effects". "Descent" was nominated for a Gemini Award in the category "Best Visual Effects". "Nightwalkers" was nominated for a Gemini Award in the category "Best Photography in a Dramatic Program or Series". "Unnatural Selection" was nominated for a Leo in the category "Dramatic Series: Best Visual Effects". For "Unnatural Selection", Andy Mikita was nominated for a Leo Award in the category "Dramatic Series: Best Director". "Metamorphosis" won a Leo Award in the category "Dramatic Series: Best Make-Up".

== Main cast ==
- Starring Richard Dean Anderson as Colonel Jack O'Neill
- Amanda Tapping as Major Samantha Carter
- Christopher Judge as Teal'c
- With Corin Nemec as Jonas Quinn
- And Don S. Davis as Major General George Hammond

== Episodes ==
Episodes in bold are continuous episodes, where the story spans over 2 or more episodes.

No. overall	No. in season	Title	Directed by	Written by	Original release date
111	1	"Redemption"	Martin Wood	Robert C. Cooper	June 7, 2002
112	2	"Redemption"	Martin Wood	Robert C. Cooper	June 14, 2002
Part 1: As SG-1 and the SGC struggle to cope with Daniel's departure, they face a new threat in the form of System Lord Anubis. Anubis has launched an attack against Earth, using an ancient weapon that will trigger an overload of energy into the Stargate in order to destroy the entire planet. As the SGC scientists scramble to find a solution, Carter finds her abilities as a scientist and military officer being put to the ultimate test with her woes increasing as her rival, Dr. Rodney McKay (David Hewlett) returns to the SGC from Russia. Teal'c goes off world after learning that his wife is gravely ill, but is left devastated when he learns that she has died. Part 2: Jack still refuses to let a Russian soldier join SG-1 despite pressure from both Chekov and General Hammond. After learning that Earth is under attack, Teal'c, Bra'tac, and Rya'c embark on a dangerous mission to find and destroy the weapon at any cost. With the plan to contact the Asgard having failed, the SGC are left on their own and Carter seeks a solution while continuing to deal with McKay's unwelcomed presence. Meanwhile, Teal'c, Bra'tac and Rya'c prepare an attack on the planet which has Anubis's weapon. Jonas later gives Carter an idea about saving the planet but it could result in Earth losing their Stargate and the Stargate Program being shut down for good.
113	3	"Descent"	Peter DeLuise	Joseph Mallozzi & Paul Mullie	June 21, 2002
SG-1 attempts to salvage a Goa'uld mothership that has been mysteriously abandoned in space near Earth. Unfortunately, the ship crashes in the ocean. SG-1 discovers that Thor's consciousness is still in the central computer.
114	4	"Frozen"	Martin Wood	Robert C. Cooper	June 28, 2002
The Antarctic team investigating the site where the second Stargate was found discovers a woman frozen in the ice. When she inexplicably recovers, the team realizes they have finally come face-to-face with an Ancient. The team starts to suffer the effects of a deadly virus and while the woman helps to heal the infected, it becomes clear that it's taking a toll.
115	5	"Nightwalkers"	Peter DeLuise	Joseph Mallozzi & Paul Mullie	July 12, 2002
Bizarre behavior in a small American town proves to be the result of Goa'uld activity.
116	6	"Abyss"	Martin Wood	Brad Wright	July 19, 2002
O'Neill has been captured by Ba'al but is being held in a fortress too well protected for Stargate Command to help. However, Jonas believes that Lord Yu might be persuaded to lend assistance. Meanwhile, O'Neill is helped through his ordeal by Daniel, who although forbidden from taking action tries to provide comfort.
117	7	"Shadow Play"	Peter DeLuise	Joseph Mallozzi & Paul Mullie	July 26, 2002
The Kelownan government contacts the SGC, offering to exchange naqahdriah for advanced technology. Jonas's old professor asks him to help a secret resistance group and prevent a world war.
118	8	"The Other Guys"	Martin Wood	Damian Kindler	August 2, 2002
Dr. Felger worships SG-1, and when he has the chance to rescue them from a Goa'uld mothership, he does not hesitate.
119	9	"Allegiance"	Peter DeLuise	Peter DeLuise	August 9, 2002
The Jaffa rebellion, the Tok'ra and their base commander Malek, and Stargate Command are temporarily forced to share Earth's Alpha Site (a secret refuge) when the Tok'ra are attacked. Suspicion between the Tok'ra and the Jaffa turns hostile when a series of murders occurs.
120	10	"Cure"	Andy Mikita	Damian Kindler	August 16, 2002
SG-1 visit Pangar, a planet once ruled by Ra. The Pangarans offer a wonder drug called Tretonin in exchange for gate addresses, but fail to mention that the drug is produced by using the progeny of the former Tok'ra queen Egeria. The drug also destroys the user's immune system, causing a crisis when supplies ran low. SG-1 calls in help from the Tok'ra Malek and Kelmaa. After Egeria is freed by the Tok'ra Kelmaa, she tells the remorseful Pangarans how to free themselves from the tretonin.
121	11	"**Prometheus**"	Peter F. Woeste	Joseph Mallozzi & Paul Mullie	August 23, 2002
A reporter has information about the Stargate Program and threatens to broadcast it on television. The SGC offers a deal to allow her access to the Prometheus on the condition that nothing is aired until the Stargate Program is made public. However, the camera crew turns out to be rogue NID agents and take over Prometheus.
122	12	"**Unnatural Selection**"	Andy Mikita	Story by : Robert C. Cooper & Brad Wright; Teleplay by : Brad Wright; Excerpts written by : Jeff F. King	December 4, 2002 (Sky One); January 10, 2003 (Sci Fi)
The Asgard have called all the Replicators in the Asgard galaxy to one planet, Hala, but the time dilation device that was meant to trap them on the planet forever has failed to activate. The Asgard want SG-1 to use the Prometheus to find out why. Unfortunately, what they find is that the Replicators have accelerated time and evolved to human form.
123	13	"Sight Unseen"	Peter F. Woeste	Story by : Ron Wilkerson; Teleplay by : Damian Kindler	December 11, 2002 (Sky One); January 17, 2003 (Sci Fi)
On a deserted planet designated P9X-391, SG-1 discovers a piece of Ancient technology. When it is moved to Earth for study, people begin to have inexplicable hallucinations.
124	14	"Smoke & Mirrors"	Peter DeLuise	Story by : Katharyn Powers; Teleplay by : Joseph Mallozzi & Paul Mullie	December 18, 2002 (Sky One); January 24, 2003 (Sci Fi)
Senator Kinsey is shot, and all the evidence seems to show that O'Neill was the assassin.
125	15	"Paradise Lost"	William Gereghty	Robert C. Cooper	January 8, 2003 (Sky One); January 31, 2003 (Sci Fi)
Maybourne offers to help the SGC find a cache of advanced alien weapons, but he is not telling them everything he knows.
126	16	"Metamorphosis"	Peter DeLuise	Story by : Jacqueline Samuda & James Tichenor; Teleplay by : James Tichenor	January 15, 2003 (Sky One); February 7, 2003 (Sci Fi)
The Russian team discovers a planet where Nirrti has been experimenting on the human population to create the perfect host.
127	17	"Disclosure"	William Gereghty	Teleplay by : Joseph Mallozzi & Paul Mullie; Excerpts written by : Heather E. Ash, Michael Cassutt, Robert C. Cooper, Peter DeLuise, Sam Egan, Jonathan Glassner, Michael Greenburg, Joseph Mallozzi, Paul Mullie, Jarrad Paul, Misha Rashovich, James Tichenor, Ron Wilkerson and Brad Wright	January 22, 2003 (Sky One); February 14, 2003 (Sci Fi)
The Americans and the Russians reveal the existence of the Stargate to the British, Chinese and French governments due to the mounting threat by Anubis. Senator Kinsey tries to use the meeting to hijack the program, but Hammond has a card up his sleeve.
128	18	"Forsaken"	Andy Mikita	Damian Kindler	January 29, 2003 (Sky One); February 21, 2003 (Sci Fi)
SG-1 finds a wrecked spacecraft whose crew claims to have been fighting off aggressive aliens ever since they crashed. It later turns out that the crew are in fact prisoners of the Serrakin ship Ceberus. The Serrakin are an advanced race who once helped free the human Hebridans, descendants of the Celts, from the Goa'uld millennia ago. Since then, the two peoples have lived together in a largely harmonious society on the planet Hebridan.
129	19	"The Changeling"	Martin Wood	Christopher Judge	February 5, 2003 (Sky One); February 28, 2003 (Sci Fi)
Teal'c finds himself jumping between different realities of Earth and the planet Kresh'ta, where a meeting of 108 Jaffa rebel leaders are ambushed by the Goa'uld System Lords. Only Daniel seems to display any understanding of reality.
130	20	"Memento"	Peter DeLuise	Damian Kindler	February 12, 2003 (Sky One); March 7, 2003 (Sci Fi)
On the maiden flight of the finished Prometheus, the reactor overloads, and SG-1 must find the Stargate buried on the alien planet Tagrea in order to obtain spare parts from Earth. Tagrea was once ruled by the Goa'uld Heru-ur, and the memory of his occupation was so traumatic that the Tagreans buried their Stargate and wiped out all traces of their earlier history, so as to make a new start. Despite opposition from xenophobic elements of the Tagrean military, the progressive Chairman Ashwan assists SG-1 in locating the Stargate and eventually opens relations with Earth.
131	21	"Prophecy"	William Waring	Joseph Mallozzi & Paul Mullie	February 19, 2003 (Sky One); March 14, 2003 (Sci Fi)
SG-1 finds a planet where the population worship Ba'al and work in the mines to provide his representative, Lord Mot, with a tribute of naqahdah. SG-1 intends to stop him, but things get complicated when Jonas starts seeing visions that could kill him.
132	22	"Full Circle"	Martin Wood	Robert C. Cooper	February 19, 2003 (Sky One); March 21, 2003 (Sci Fi)
Daniel Jackson contacts Jack and tells him that Anubis has located the Eye of Ra, an enormously powerful weapon. SG-1 heads for Abydos to rally their old friends against Anubis's fleet, while Daniel confronts Anubis and learns the terrifying truth about him. While trying to find the Eye, SG-1 learns that there is a Lost City of the Ancients that may hold the key to defeating Anubis once and for all.
