= Prometheus (Stargate) =

Fictional starship in the TV series Stargate SG-1

- Stargate SG-1 vehicle
- The Prometheus as depicted in the Stargate SG-1 season 9 episode "Beachhead".
- First appearance: "Prometheus"; Stargate SG-1; 2002
- Last appearance: "The Road Not Taken"; 2007
- Created by: Bridget McGuire

Information
- Affiliation: United States Air Force
- Launched: 2002
- Captain: Colonel William Ronson; General George Hammond; Colonel Lionel Pendergast
- Auxiliary vehicles: F-302

General characteristics
- Registry: X-303 (original); BC-303

Prometheus or X-303 and later BC-303 is a fictional starship that appears in the military science fiction television series Stargate SG-1. The ship was first introduced during the show's sixth season in the episode titled "Prometheus", and would go on to become a recurring setting over the remainder of the series as well as being depicted in various spin-off media.

The ship was first written into the show by Joseph Mallozzi and Paul Mullie, and was designed by production designer Bridget McGuire. As well as McGuire, Mullie and Mallozzi, executive producer Brad Wright and art directors James Robbins and Peter Bodnarus also played a significant role in conceptualising and designing the ship.

Modern day naval vessels were the main influence for the ship's design, with McGuire basing much of the interior on submarines, whilst destroyers and aircraft carriers helped inform much of the ship's exterior.

== Development and Production ==
=== Concept and initial design ===
Prometheus was first introduced in the episode of the same name, which was written by Joseph Mallozzi and Paul Mullie. Work on designing the spaceship began in 2002, with the Prometheus being imagined by the shows writers as Earth's answer to the Goa'uld mothership. Mullie described wanting to create a ship that was "exactly the opposite of the Goa'uld ships, which are basically big empty rooms", explaining that executive producer Brad Wright wanted a set with objects that could be interacted with by the actors, such as screens, buttons, chairs and flashing lights; none of which could be found on the shows Goa'uld sets. The shows production designer Bridget McGuire and her team began their work around five weeks before filming commenced. According to McGuire, the writers wanted a ship "that looked less like a hi-tech alien vessel, and more like one that had been built for the USAF".

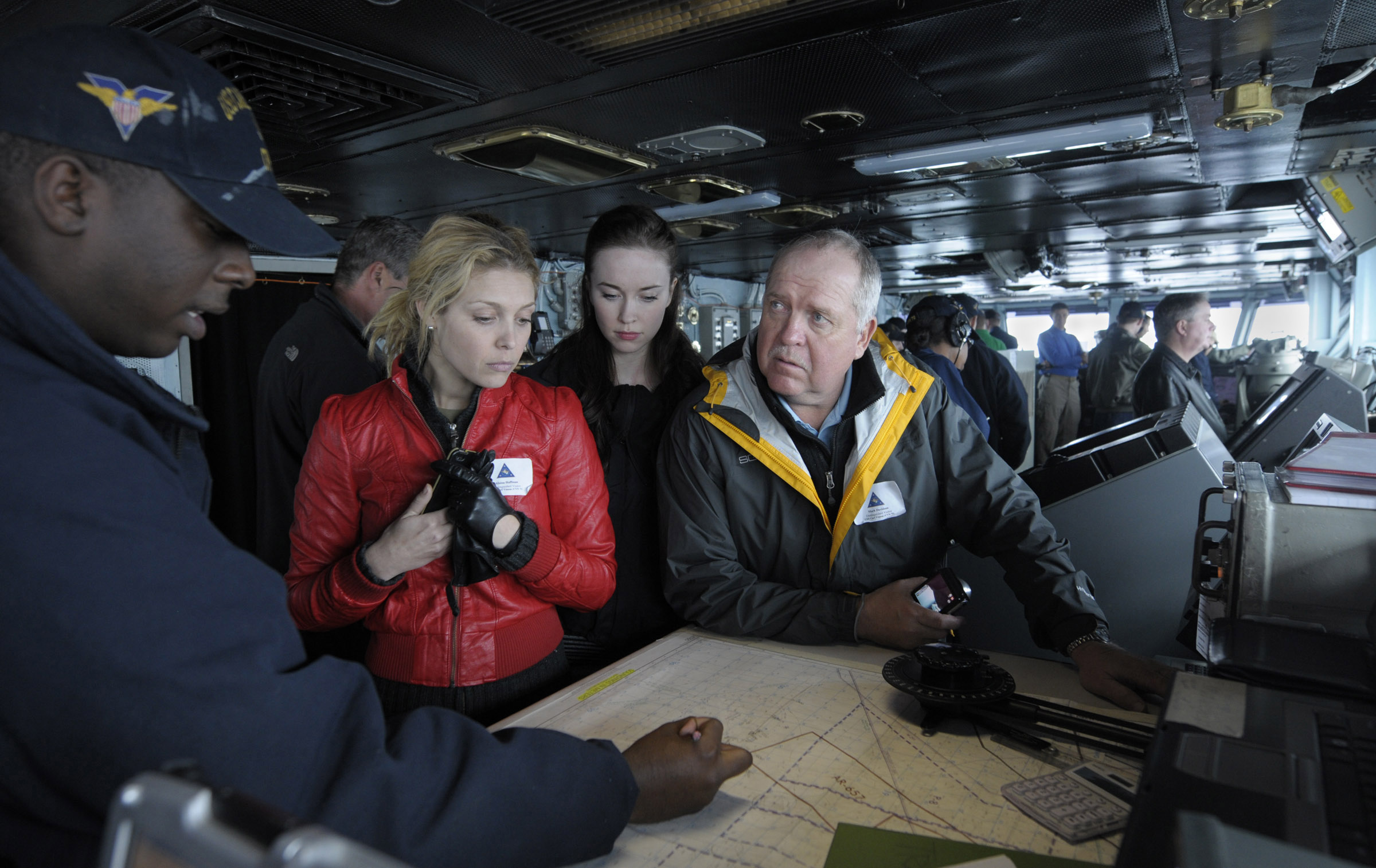
Stargate Universe actors Alaina Huffman and Elyse Levesque with set decorator Mark Davidson on the navigation bridge of the United States Navy Aircraft Carrier USS Carl Vinson. The interior and exterior of United States aircraft carriers, destroyers and submarines helped inform the design of Prometheus.

McGuire focused in on the idea of having contemporary sea-going military craft inform both the interior and exterior of the ship's design and had Assistant Art Director Noeleen Tobin research a collection of reference images and schematics to help the process. Tobin came back with reference material the designers could use for inspiration. Images of ship bridges, engine rooms and other areas of various United States Aircraft carriers and submarines. McGuire wanted to "incorporate many features we see in military vessels today, and adapt them for space travel", imagining Prometheus as "more or less a destroyer in Space". McGuire specifically wanted to include "confined spaces, low ceilings and plenty of exposed conduits and piping" from submarines and aircraft control towers into the ship's design. In her concept, McGuire knew the ship would focus around a bridge space, engine room and that the ship would also contain a hangar bay to house the smaller X-302 fighter craft, although they would not initially be building that part of the set.

After putting together some sketches, McGuire shared her concept with art directors Peter Bodnarus and James Robbins, both of whom then built upon McGuire's ideas, coming up with their own drawings before reconvening to decide upon a more definite, final look for the ship. Robbins was then responsible for developing the exterior schematics and the interior workings of the ship. In his plans for the ship, Robbins purposely chose "function over form", making the ship "utilitarian" in its design, describing it as "not a pretty ship". Furthermore, Robbins reflected the writers desire that the ship "had alien technology in it, but we didn't see that". Robbins created deck plans for the ship, including positioning all of the different components and systems vital to the ship's function. Robbins also imagined the ship's propulsion, armament and crew complement in his specifications. Although ultimately not used, Robbin's conceptualised that Prometheus would have its own unique hyperdrive whereby the ship travelled through hyperspace on rails that projected from the nacelles, as opposed to forming a window like other ships from the series. Meanwhile, Bodnarus was responsible for developing drawings of the set interiors, such as the bridge, corridors, engine room and air lock. Bodnarus began by building a three-dimensional or virtual set on the computer and set about experimenting "with various views and develop a sense of depth" in the interior spaces of the ship. Once completed, Bodnarus was responsible for creating the final blueprints from which the set would be constructed.

=== Construction and sets ===
The set was originally constructed on Stage 6 at The Bridge Studios in Burnaby, Canada. The set was designed and built so that it could be easily taken apart, either entirely or as individual sections; with walls, windows and doors built on wheels or hinges allowing them to be moved for better access during filming. Two main spaces were initially constructed, the bridge and a multi-purpose room, which were interconnected by a hallway. The multi-purpose room was designed to be redressable, initially serving as the ship's engine room, dining room and storage room. The hallways were constructed in a figure of 8 configuration allowing for walk and talk scenes to loop round and round the ship as per the needs to the scene, whilst doors and bulkheads could be moved into place to change the layout of the hallways. Construction of the set was done to a "very tight schedule", with set decorator Mark Davidson describing it as "an incredible collaboration of different departments to get it as fast as we did". Three different build crews were put together, one for constructing the beams, another the bulkheads and the third crew built the windows and walls. As the set was not going to be entirely complete by the time filming was scheduled to commence, the story for the first episode to feature the ship was changed slightly to reflect the fact that the ship was still under construction. Once filming commenced on the episode "Prometheus", set decorator Mark Davidson and the construction team were still actively building the bridge set, meaning director Peter Woeste was limited to only filming in the multi-purpose room for the first day of shooting.

Dressing the set, the naval theme was continued, whilst also looking to make the decor slightly more "futuristic" and a "cross between military and alien". Initially 15 flatscreen monitors were used to decorate the ship, whilst the older CRT monitors were built into set pieces, with cutouts over-the-top "to make them look a little more high end". Ladders were installed around the ship to give the impression of the scope of Prometheus and that the ship had multiple levels. Numerous pieces of electronic test equipment were also purchased and then taken apart, reconfigured, combined with various pieces made by the model shop and then built into various consoles and set pieces to provide the actors with switches, buttons and lights to interact with. Other features, such as the star-map console on the bridge were made from plexiglass whilst Davidson constructed the ship's crystal trays from mainframe computer drawers. Davidson combined the more futuristic elements with what he thought of as more "retro" pieces, such as corded telephones and fire extinguishers and a sink/toilet unit from an aircraft.

As a cost saving measure the Prometheus set was redressed to also serve as the Earth ship Daedalus which was introduced in the second season of Stargate Atlantis. The set would then be reused again as the setting for more Earth spaceships and stations, including the Apollo and Midway Station in Stargate Atlantis, Odyssey and Korolev in SG-1 and finally the Hammond in Stargate Universe. The set was expanded upon for its use as subsequent ships and stations, with new consoles, fixtures, corridors and rooms. In 2010 at the end of the first season of Stargate Universe the set was taken down and placed into storage, before eventually being entirely dismantled for auction.

=== Filming and lighting ===
The set was fitted with hundreds of fluorescent lights built directly into the walls, ceilings and floors. Director of photography Jim Menard noted that this meant filming could often rely on the practical lighting, "we can shoot with just the ship lighting and then do if you do a close-up you can fix up their shadows on their eyes and things". When it first came to filming in the set, director Peter Woeste along with chief lighting technician Rick Dean and directors of photography Jim Menard and Andrew Wilson had to work very quickly on their initial lighting design for Prometheus, only having access to the set from the day before filming commenced. Wilson and Woeste decided that whilst the Prometheus was still in the hangar it, as it would be in earlier scenes of the story, it would be under white industrial interior lighting, allowing for some leeway in fully realising the ship's fully-operational look. After its introductory episodes of "Prometheus" and "Unnatural Selection", Menard felt the ship's lighting was a "little bit red, white and blue" and hoped to "get away from that", whilst director Peter DeLuise felt it was "too bright" onboard and along with Woeste wanted to take the look of the ship "darker" and "moodier" for future episodes. The pair implemented their changes in the episode "Memento", looking to more closely mirror the bridge of an aircraft carrier, relying predominantly on dark-blue lighting with DeLuise believing this could be justified as this was the first time the ship was being depicted as fully-operational.

=== CGI models and exterior ===
The Prometheus ship model was created entirely as a computer generated image by the visual effects studio Image Engine, with the studio basing their work on Robbin's drawings. Rainmaker Digital Effects also worked on various shots of the ship over the course of the show. Many of the visual effects shots were designed to be reused throughout the show as a money-saving effort. This included the shots such as Frank Simmons (John DeLancie) being blown out of an airlock in the episode "Prometheus", which would later be altered for the episode "Memento", replacing Simmons with the hyperdrive core module. Shots of the Prometheus flying by or landing on different planets were also altered and reused in episodes such as "Memento" and "Beachhead".

Outside of the bridge set a greenscreen was hung allowing for visual effect shots to be added, however as a cost-saving alternative to a star field visual effect production could swap the greenscreen for a black curtain that had small pieces of mirror attached, which when lit gave the effect of a star field. The multi-purpose room window also featured a window and greenscreen which would be used for shots of the ship's engine core.

In season six through eight the ship had two pods, or nacelles on either side. Onscreen and in Robbin's original drawings these were intended to be a form of propulsion. In season nine, these were reconceived as hanger bays from which the F-302 could launch.

=== Writing ===
In order to justify the expense of building such a large set Prometheus was intended to be featured throughout multiple episodes of season six. At this time executive producer Brad Wright expected that this would be the final season of Stargate SG-1 and felt that it was "time to start seeing some of the benefits, some of the repercussions of what we've learned and the technology we've brought back from all the places we've been", imagining both the Prometheus and X-302 as being technical developments that had come about from the Stargate program. Wright also expected that the season would build towards a showdown with Anubis, and planned on using the Prometheus in a Stargate SG-1 feature film that would have concluded the show and setup the spinoff series Stargate Atlantis. In conceptualizing and writing material set on board the Prometheus, the writers spent time theorising what "the United States Air Force do with a big ship in outer space", combining elements of not just the Air Force, but also the Navy and imagining how it would work.

The writers were conscious of comparisons to science fiction series Star Trek, with Paul Mullie acknowledging that by setting episodes onboard Prometheus "You might say we're sort of straying into Star Trek territory now", whilst Peter DeLuise called the episode "Memento" "a lot of fun being able to do our own Star Trek-type thing". Despite this, Joseph Mallozzi stated that the show wouldn't turn into Star Trek, whilst Cooper justified earth building ships like the Prometheus as "a natural progression", proclaiming "I love the ships. I think they're cool, and I think ship shows are cool. I don't think we're ever in danger of becoming Star Trek". In writing episodes set on board the Prometheus, writers such as Damian Kindler felt that it was important that he not lose sight of what Stargate SG-1 was about and in writing "Memento" explained "you can't get too in love with the fact you've got a new big toy to play with", believing that stories involving the ship should all come back to the Stargate.

In season seven, the Prometheus registry was changed from X-303 to BC-303. Writer Joseph Mallozzi confirmed that the ship was no longer deemed "experimental" and that BC was short for Battle Cruiser. As the show continued into its seventh and eighth season, Joseph Mallozzi felt that Prometheus had become a character that the show needed "to check in on now and again" and executive producer Robert C. Cooper would encourage the writers to set stories on board the ship in order to justify keeping the set up, resulting in episodes such as "Memento", "Grace" and "Prometheus Unbound".

Daedalus, the sister-ship of Prometheus was originally imagined as an "improved version of the Prometheus" by art director James Robbins when blueprints of the ship were first shown in the episode "Moebius", however these plans were abandoned with art director Peter Bodnarus entirely reimagining the Daedalus as its own new class of ship.

=== Destruction ===
In writing the ninth season of Stargate SG-1, executive producer Robert C. Cooper made the decision that the Prometheus would be destroyed. This was in response to the Prometheus set at the time also being used as the Earth ship Daedalus in spinoff series Stargate Atlantis. Whilst based around the same set, the two ship interiors had a number of differences, such as the main window, a number of the consoles and other fixtures on the bridge, which had to be changed over depending on which ship was being used in the scene. To save production the time and money of flipping the set, Cooper decided that destroying the Prometheus would instead allow Stargate SG-1 to introduce its own Daedalus-class ship - the Odyssey.

The destruction of the ship would take place in the episode "Ethon", at the hands of an Ori satellite weapon. Cooper wanted the destruction sequence to be "Titanic in space", feeling that it was important to show SG-1 and Prometheus "mess everything up" and result in a "massive, massive tragedy" occurring. Playing off the imagery of the Titanic sinking, Cooper wanted the Prometheus being destroyed "to take a long, painful time" and encouraged visual effects supervisor Michelle Comens to make the visual effects shot as long as possible. Writers Joseph Mallozzi and Paul Mullie had originally written scenes for the episode "Ripple Effect" that would foreshadow the destruction of the ship, however they were ultimately cut for time.

== Depiction ==
The X-303 is first mentioned in the second part of the season six opening episode, "Redemption". The Prometheus, also known as X-303 first appears in the episode of the same name, where it is still under construction in a secret underground facility in Nevada. The ship has been constructed by the United States Air Force using a combination of human and alien technology that has been acquired by Stargate Command over the years. The incomplete ship is stolen by rogue NID operatives, including Frank Simmons and the Goa'uld, Adrian Conrad. After Prometheus is recaptured by SG-1, in "Unnatural Selection", the Asgard Thor enlists SG-1 and the ship to help deal with a Replicator threat on the Asgard homeworld. In the episode "Memento", Prometheus undergoes its shakedown flight and is now under the command of Colonel William Ronson. During testing, the hyperdrive engine overloads and the crew are forced to eject the core, stranding them on a world called Tagrea, where they have to locate the Stargate which has been buried. Without a working hyperdrive engine, the Prometheus remains stranded on Tagrea and in the episode "Enemy Mine" Stargate Command are mining the alien mineral Naquadah to construct more BC-303 ships.

In the episode "Grace" the ship begins it voyage back to Earth using a hyperdrive acquired from a Goa'uld Alkesh in the episode "Avenger 2.0". Once back on earth, General George Hammond assumes command of the ship to defend the planet against the forces of Anubis in "Lost City". After the battle, in the episode "New Order" Colonel Lionel Pendergast is made the commanding officer of Prometheus and in "Endgame" the ship undergoes a refit, with the Asgard installing beam technology and a hyperdrive engine. General George Hammond once again assumes command of Prometheus in the episode "Prometheus Unbound" when he leads a rescue mission to find the Atlantis expedition, but on route is hijacked by Vala Mal Doran and are ultimately forced to return to earth. The Prometheus was due to be fitted with new railguns, however these were instead sent to Atlantis to help defend them against the Wraith in the Stargate Atlantis episode "The Siege".

By the episode "Avalon" the ship has been fitted with Asgard sensors, which it uses to assist SG-1 in locating an Ancient structure beneath the Glastonbury Tor. After the Ori attack a Free Jaffa world in "Beachhead", SG-1 travel on board the ship to attempt to stop the Ori invasion and ultimately halt construction of the first Ori Supergate. The ship's Asgard transporter is used to help thwart Ba'al from destroying part of Downtown Seattle in "Ex Deus Machina". In the episode "Ripple Effect" SG-1 along with another version of the team from an alternate reality use the ship to close a breach in space. Stargate Command is asked by Jared Kane to help destroy an Ori satellite that has been built by his people, The Rand Protectorate, who intend on annihilating the rival nation on their world, Caledonia. SG-1 and Prometheus travel to Kane's homeworld of Tegalus, but soon realise the satellite is more than the ship can handle. As the ship is disabled, Pendergast helps transport the crew to safety before going down with the ship. Around a year later whilst stuck in an alternate reality, Samantha Carter is taken on board the Prometheus, which is now being used as Air Force One by President Hank Landry.

The Prometheus was included as a non-playable vehicle in the cancelled video game Stargate SG-1: The Alliance, that was in development around 2004. In 2021 the Prometheus was added as a controllable vehicle in the mobile game AstroKings, along with other elements from the Stargate television franchise.

== Impact ==
Sean Ferrick for WhatCulture called Prometheus "something of a symbol for the earlier to middle age of the show, bulky but still fully functional", noting the storytelling possibilities that the ship created for Stargate SG-1 in expanding beyond just using the Stargate "while still keeping the show grounded where it needed to be". Also writing for WhatCulture, Alastair Greenwell called the ship's introduction "worth the wait", believing that the teething issues in episodes such as "Memento" "only endears the ship more to the fans". Keith DeCandido for Tor.com felt the ship was representative of Earth "becoming an actual power in the galaxy as opposed to an irritant". Darren Sumner, founder of fansite Gateworld disliked the design of the Prometheus, and despite finding it exciting that Earth had developed an interstellar battlecruiser, he thought it was "ridiculously ugly". Fansite Dial the Gate host David Read shared Sumner's sentiments, and also highlighted his dissatisfaction at the existence of the Prometheus not being set up or foreshadowed prior to its reveal in episode of the same name.

In discussing the role of spaceships, including the Prometheus, and how it impacted Stargate SG-1, Gateworld's David Read felt that the Stargate and the ship were often in conflict with each other as storytelling devices, and was of the opinion that ships should "carry stories as minimally as possible", fearing that the show could turn into Star Trek. Sumner felt that in season six and season seven the spaceships "were not infringing" on the Stargate, but believed in season nine and season ten they were "really encroaching on the Stargate as the centre-piece of the show", believing that episodes such as "Memento" and "The Pegasus Project" were "good examples of using our ships tell to interesting stories that I think build on the world of Stargate, instead of replacing the Stargate".

=== Set auctions, models and toys ===
Many of the set pieces were reworked into the later Daedalus-class ships' sets. After being deconstructed in 2010 some set pieces and props from the ship were sold at auction, this included the pilot and tactical consoles which sold for US$600 and US$1,250 respectively, whilst the captain's chair sold for US$1,750. Bridge chairs, control crystal trays, girders from the corridor set and control panels were also auctioned off. The 23-page set blueprints were also sold at auction for US$1,600.

In November 2023, toy company BlueBrixx announced their Stargate line, which included a buildable Prometheus. Also in November 2023, Master Replicas released a model of the ship.
