= Stargate SG-1 season 8 =

Season of television series

Stargate SG-1
- Season 8
- DVD cover
- Starring: Richard Dean Anderson; Amanda Tapping; Christopher Judge; Michael Shanks
- No. of episodes: 20

Release
- Original network: Syfy
- Original release: July 9, 2004 – February 22, 2005

Season chronology
- ← Previous; Season 7 Next → Season 9

The eighth season of Stargate SG-1, an American-Canadian military science fiction television series, began airing on July 9, 2004, on the Sci Fi channel. The eighth season concluded on February 22, 2005, after 20 episodes on British Sky One, which overtook the Sci Fi Channel in mid-season. This was the first season of the show to have 20 episodes instead of 22, as well as the first to air concurrently with Stargate SG-1 spinoff series Stargate Atlantis (the first season thereof). The series was originally developed by Brad Wright and Jonathan Glassner, while Brad Wright and Robert C. Cooper served as executive producers. Season eight regular cast members include Richard Dean Anderson, Amanda Tapping, with Christopher Judge, and Michael Shanks.

== Production ==
=== Cast and characters ===
The regular cast members of season eight are Richard Dean Anderson as Colonel/Brigadier General Jack O'Neill, Amanda Tapping as Major/Lieutenant Colonel Samantha Carter, Christopher Judge as the Jaffa Teal'c, and Michael Shanks as civilian Dr. Daniel Jackson. After O'Neill's promotion to commander of Stargate Command, Carter assumes command of SG-1. Despite being one of the main characters, Anderson's time on set was further reduced from previous seasons, and he only worked 3.5 out of 5 working days per week. After seven years of shaving his head for his role, Judge was granted his wish to have hair in season 8.

The first season of Stargate Atlantis was filmed in parallel to the eighth season of SG-1, and aired in the time slot immediately following SG-1. Richard Dean Anderson and Michael Shanks appeared in the pilot episode of Stargate Atlantis. Beginning with "New Order" and continuing into the spinoff series Stargate Atlantis, Torri Higginson replaced Jessica Steen as Dr. Elizabeth Weir. Ellie Harvie, who first appeared in "Prometheus Unbound" as Lindsey Novak, later became a recurring character on Stargate Atlantis.

Among the notable guest stars in season eight were Steve Bacic, who Robert C. Cooper already had in mind for the part of Camulus in three of the first four episodes of season 8. Bacic is known for playing Gaheris Rhade and Telemachus Rhade on Andromeda, and previously played SG Team leader Major Coburn in "Maternal Instinct" and "The First Ones". "New Order" also marks the first appearance of Colonel Lionel Pendergast (Barclay Hope). "Prometheus Unbound" guest starred Claudia Black, of Farscape fame, as Vala Mal Doran. Black had originally been considered for the role of Krista in "Affinity", but her schedule did not allow it. Krista was then played by Erica Durance, who played Lois Lane in Smallville and Black would later join the cast of Stargate as a regular, playing Vala in seasons 9 and 10. Dan Castellaneta, the voice of Homer Simpson on The Simpsons, guest starred as Joe Spencer in the episode "Citizen Joe". Charles Shaughnessy, known from his role in The Nanny as Maxwell Sheffield, appeared as Colson in "Covenant". Tony Amendola appears again as Bra'tac, and Carmen Argenziano as Jacob Carter/Selmak. Another recurring actor is Mel Harris as Oma Desala in "Threads".

With the defeat of the Goa'uld in "Reckoning"/"Threads", several actors make their final appearance in season eight. Yu, the longest-running Goa'uld recurring character, dies. Season eight also sees the final defeat of main villain Anubis. After David Palffy played Anubis from seasons five through seven, the entity that made up Anubis was portrayed by Michael Shanks, Gavin Hood, Holly Ferguson, Amanda Tapping and Richard Dean Anderson in "Lockdown", by Dean Aylesworth and Rik Kiviaho in "Reckoning", and finally by George Dzundza in "Threads". As with the two preceding seasons' finales, "Moebius" was intended to be the Stargate SG-1 series finale, and as such many actors reprised their roles from past episodes: Don S. Davis as George Hammond, Peter Williams as Apophis, Colin Cunningham as Major Davis, and Jay Acovone as Charles Kawalsky. "Moebius" was the last episode to feature Richard Dean Anderson as a main cast member.

The main technician (played by Gary Jones), who sported the name "Norman Davis" on his uniform for seven years, was officially renamed "Walter Harriman". In the episode "2010", O'Neill referred to him as "Walter". Simply renaming the character to "Walter Davis" did not clear, so he was renamed to "Walter Harriman" after Hammond had called him "Airman", which sounds similar to "Harriman", in the pilot episode. Joseph Mallozzi explained the resulting incongruity by positing that Harriman is Walter's married name.

One scene in "Zero Hour" featured Pierre Bernard as a technician. Bernard is a graphics designer for the NBC show Late Night with Conan O'Brien, and was offered the cameo on SG-1 after a rant on Late Night in which he said the show was better without Daniel Jackson. The show's writers named his character "O'Brien" as a tongue-in-cheek reference. The Stargate producers later invited Bernard back to the set for a scene in the 200th episode of SG-1.

=== Writing ===
After production wrapped on season seven, the writers came together and pitched ideas for Stargate's eighth and presumably final season. Seasons five through seven had previously been expected to be the last, but the show was renewed each year. The team ultimately agreed on about ten initial episodes, two of which would comprise a two-hour premiere intended to address issues remaining from the season seven finale.

In the first draft of "New Order, Part 1," Richard Woolsey assumed command of the SGC, but in the end the writers decided that the character of Dr. Weir suited the story better because of her background in diplomacy. She also offered a link to the Atlantis spin-off and was seen as a better candidate to offer O'Neill his promotion. The end of "New Order" with Fifth creating Replicator Carter was also not in the original outline. Robert C. Cooper came up with the twist while he was writing the script. Originally, Anubis was planned to end up on a fiery planet at the end of "Lockdown", but Joseph Mallozzi opted for the frozen world instead.

The idea for "Icon" came from Damian Kindler pitching a story in season seven "in which Carter is stranded off-world, struggling to survive, while the rest of the team mounts a desperate bid to rescue her". In November 2003, in preparation of season eight, the writers felt that they already had enough Carter stories and attempted to redress the balance by making it a Daniel story with the working title "English Patient Daniel". "Affinity" was originally intended to air after "Covenant". Airing "Affinity" first creates the minor continuity error of Daniel already knowing the name, disclosed in "Covenant", of the newly formed Trust.

The writers always wanted to do a "fish out of water" story wholly dedicated to Teal'c and his attempts to fit into Earth society, but later felt that the only opportunity would have been in season one. The script of "Full Alert" called for a large military build-up and a potential worldwide confrontation, but the show's budget was limited. As such, screens were erected to sell the point of an impending military conflict on a global scale. Furthermore, stock shots of jets landing on aircraft carriers and missile silos opening were used to accommodate financial concerns.

=== Plot ===
The eighth season begins with the SG-1 team trying to revive Colonel Jack O'Neill (Richard Dean Anderson) after the events of the seventh season. At the end of the two-episode season opener, Colonel O'Neill is promoted to General and assumes command of Stargate Command (SGC), while Major Samantha Carter (Amanda Tapping) is promoted to Lieutenant Colonel and assumes command of SG-1. The season arc centers on the growing threat and seemingly final defeat of the Goa'uld and the Replicators, races who were introduced in the first and third season of the show, respectively.

=== Filming ===
The eighth season of Stargate SG-1 was filmed over an eight-month period, with twelve-hour days five times each week. Filming started at 7:00 am, broke for a half-hour lunch break in the afternoon, and ended at 7:30 pm. The directors usually received scripts around two weeks before shooting started. Early seasons had 7.5 days to shoot an episode but with careful planning, season eight reduced this time to six days. Richard Dean Anderson only worked 3.5 days out of 5 working days a week during season eight. Owing to his limited availability some episodes, such as "Zero Hour", were shot over longer periods of weeks. "Zero Hour" was shot as the seventh out of the 20 episodes of season eight. The producers do not treat two-part episodes as a different episode but as one longer episode, though the episodes are still legally broken up into two with the actors, for example, being paid twice.

Stargate SG-1 has several regular directors. Andy Mikita is known to shoot much coverage because he likes having the choices during cut-and-edit. Peter DeLuise, however, lets the cameras roll, which makes things more difficult for the script supervisor and the editors later. The video tapes are not reusable and are archived in a library. "Lockdown" was the first SG-1 episode to be shot in high definition (HD) instead of on 35 mm film. Since no one was used to filming in HD, they had to get a new HD crew and lost about an hour per day. The HD video tapes cost around 50 dollars, and previously 7000 feet of film were shot each day, costing possibly a million dollars a year in film.

Episodes such as "Zero Hour" and "Prometheus Unbound" reduced costs by being shot mainly on the standing sets Stargate Command and the Prometheus. At other times the actors' time was split between different episodes: "Gemini" concentrated on Amanda Tapping as Carter and her alter ego RepliCarter, and Michael Shanks (Daniel) did not appear. Meanwhile, Shanks filmed "Promethues Unbound" in the absence of the Carter character. The money was then spent on time-consuming techniques such as motion control in "Gemini". The motion control enabled two people in the same shot to be seamlessly filmed on different passes. Split screens with locked-off cameras and different shots with stand-in actors were used whenever possible, but still cost much time for wardrobe changes and blocking.

The first episode filmed after the hiatus was "Lockdown", which aired third. The writers thought it would be fun to test O'Neill in his new position as general of the SGC early on and to have him prove his worth. The episode "Avatar" served as an introduction for a Stargate game that was produced at the time, and much of the story was filmed from a first-person perspective. "Zero Hour" is the last episode to have CRT monitors in the briefing room and the control room. Amanda Tapping originally hoped to direct another episode after her debut in season seven's "Resurrection", but she became pregnant late in the season.

=== Sets and locations ===
Sets from previous seasons were reused: The Goa'uld transport ship, a standing set in the NorCo Studios, was originally built for a particular episode in season one but has since been reused in "New Order". Despite its cool looks, it is hard to shoot in. The Stargate franchise acquired the set of Blade: Trinity and used it as Thor's ship in "New Order". They were able to make the set taller, and installed big arches and silver tilework. They also created a special command post for Thor and raised it off the ground so that the actors' eye lines with Thor was a little higher. The Blade 3 effects stage was also used for the F-302 scene in "Covenant".

Art director James Robbins designed the set for Fifth's space ship, which was only about 10 feet long and 6 feet wide. For the scene where Carter is embedded in Replicator tiles, the model shop used cut-out vacuform pieces and slabs that had been made to fit Amanda Tapping. The Prometheus set, the producers' answer to the Goa'uld ship design, was used in several season eight episodes. Instead of big empty rooms, the Prometheus set had seats, screens, buttons and switches. "Endgame" required the interior of a Goa'uld ship to hold a Stargate, an effect which has not been used since season one. The Puddle Jumper space ship, usually part of Stargate Atlantis stories, also had its first appearances in SG-1; it appeared in "It's Good to be King" and "Moebius". "Threads" used the diner set from Dead Like Me.

Although "Lockdown" was filmed mainly on the existing Stargate Command set, the story made it necessary to have the SGC broken into segregated zones. The set decorators changed the graphics and lighting to make the set show some of the 28 different levels of the SGC. In the same episode O'Neill's new office was slightly redesigned to mirror the history of the character. The carpet in the Briefing Room was replaced every second year early in the show, but when the renewal of the show changed from a two-year basis to a yearly basis, the carpet was never renewed again. When SG-1 was renewed for an eighth season, the carpet was finally replaced, and the floor in the halls was repainted."

The idea for the plants in "Zero Hour" came from Brad Wright, who in season four had the notion of the SG being overrun with plant life and the gate being literally buried under foliage. For "Icon", one of the locations used was a house built in the early 1900s. Like "Birthright" one year before, exterior scenes for "Sacrifices" were filmed at High Point Properties in Langley, British Columbia. The Goa'uld ceremonial tent in the episode was designed to be re-usable, with the concept loosely based on the Hagia Sophia in Istanbul. "Reckoning", in which Carter attempts to open the Ancient Wall, was filmed at a sound stage at NorCo Studios, a former bicycle factory. The ventilation is questionable, and when the director decided to add smoke for the light to catch to give a dramatic dusty air feeling, the oxygen supply decreased, which made acting harder. Daniel's class room in "Moebius" were shot in the conference room of The Outer Limits production at Bridge Studios near the set of SG-1. SG-1 crew members had originally scouted a real school but lost that location. Carter's office room in the same episode was right down the hall from the conference room.

Stargate SG-1 was shot in Vancouver, British Columbia, Canada. As Vancouver is still developing, Tynehead Park is one of the few locations where the SG-1 team can still film alien locations. Other Vancouver locations include a set of roads at a Vancouver airport for the episode "Full Alert". The roads were closed to regular traffic so that the filming could take place without police escorts and other difficulties that come from blocking traffic. Desert locations were shot at the Richmond Sand Dunes, a cement factory that is slowly using up all the sand. What is seen in the "Moebius" desert is all that is left of the dune. The horse shoe form of the dune had been established by another television project called Legend of Earthsea. O'Neill's house, which was first seen in season one, was used in two episodes in season eight, "Full Alert" and "Citizen Joe". Since the house is inhabited in real life, the producers have looked for alternatives, but so far have been unsuccessful. For "Zero Hour", the SGC set was decorated with various plants and vines. Some plants were plastic, but for the torching scenes, real plants were used so as to minimize the risk of a fire. All objects on set were sprayed with flame-retardant chemicals.

=== Design, props and special effects ===
Before the season began, director Martin Wood spent a weekend at Cheyenne Mountain Complex (where the fictional Stargate Command takes place) and filmed new angles at night time, daytime, and emergency situations. The producers had previously re-used stock footage from season one for the last seven seasons.

To save money, props and footage were re-used from previous seasons. The chairs used in "Avatar" are the same used in the season two episode "The Gamekeeper", but since they had been cut up and changed around completely for a previous SG-1 episode, and re-adjusting them would have cost as much money as building new ones, they were used like they were. Catherine's amulet that was shown in "Moebius" is the same used in the movie. In "Reckoning", some shots of the replicators in the SGC are re-uses of footage from the episode "Menace". At other times, whole scenes were cut. The original scripted teaser for "Lockdown" would have cost US$100,000 for visual effects, with Anubis in the space ship. The falling Replicator chips and the resulting mess on the ground in "Reckoning", however, was animated in VisFX because it would have been more expensive to have the mess be tracked. Image Engine created the bug effects in "New Order". One scene involved hundreds of Replicator bugs running in a forest, for which they went from singly hand-animated bugs to replicated effects.

Season eight was the first year that used a rear screen with an LCD projector projecting the puddle for the Stargate wormhole effect. Before that time, this was too expensive and not bright enough. The outside of the Puddle Jumper space ship in "Moebius" also used a rear screen projection, for which a dune at a real location was filmed and then projected on a screen behind the Puddle Jumper windows. This allowed to move the camera around and not be locked off. The on-set Puddle Jumper is only about 2/3 the size of that of the actual space ship. For dramatic effect, the episode "Zero Hour" had longer scenes filmed in green. "Gemini" had scenes filmed in infrared.

== Release and reception ==
"New Order" and "Moebius (Part 2)" both earned a 2.4 Nielsen rating, a new record high for the show during its run on cable, which has since been equalled but never beaten. It also became the most-watched regular series episode ever for the Sci Fi Channel and the highest-rated episode in the history of Stargate SG-1, drawing 3.22 million viewers. The episode "Threads" originally aired as a 63-minute piece on the Sci Fi Channel, but an edited 45-minute version exists for syndication. The 45-minute versions is missing several scenes, including Daniel speaking with Ancient and O'Neill waking up with Kerry. TV Zone's Jan Vincent-Rudzki called "Lockdown" "an interesting episode, although it dips in the middle." Vincent-Rudzki saw O'Neill's portrayal as the new leader making "the Goa'uld threat [...] a laugh" and "an amazing change from the events from the series' early days" if even O'Neill does not take this race seriously. Fans regarded "Reckoning", the climax of plots including the Goa'uld, the Replicators, and the Jaffa Rebellion, as two of the most popular episodes of the series.

In 2005, the second part of the season opener "New Order" was nominated for a Gemini Award in the category "Best Visual Effects". "Reckoning (Part 2)" was nominated for both an Emmy Award in the category "Outstanding Special Visual Effects for a Series" and a Leo Award in the category "Best Visual Effects". Peter DeLuise was nominated for a Leo Award in the category "Dramatic Series: Best Screenwriting" for "Affinity", while Christine Mooney was honored with a Leo Award in the category "Dramatic Series – Best Costume Design" for the season finale "Moebius (Part 2)". For the episode "Threads", actress Amanda Tapping won a Leo Award in the category "Dramatic Series: Best Lead Performance – Female", and Michael Shanks was nominated in the Leo category "Dramatic Series: Best Lead Performance – Male". The episode "It's Good To Be King" led to three Leo Award nominations: Jim Menard in the category "Dramatic Series: Best Cinematography", Christine Mooney for "Dramatic Series: Best Costume Design", and Tom McBeath in the category "Dramatic Series: Best Supporting Performance – Male".

Season eight was released to DVD in Europe and Australia. The episodes "Gemini" and "Prometheus Unbound" switched sides, and "Citizen Joe" was placed after "Reckoning"/"Threads". Contrary to the Region 1 DVD, the Region 2 did not offer commentaries for "It's Good to be King" and "Citizen Joe". When the season was initially released on DVD in Region 1, the release temporarily contained the shortened 45-minute version of "Threads" until Metro-Goldwyn-Mayer (MGM) gave in due to complaints. The slimline re-release contains the full 63-minute episode. Neither region has commentaries for "Threads". The release of season nine was held up because of MGM's switch in partners for home distribution, from Sony to Fox.

=== Cultural references ===
In "Zero Hour" Dr. Lee says, "Thankfully [the plant] hasn't eaten anyone yet." O'Neill answers, "Well, thank you Seymour." This is a reference to the comedy-musical Little Shop of Horrors about a man-eating plant from space. In "Avatar", Teal'c says "I play Def Jam Vendetta". This was a late addition by actor Chris Judge, who provided the voice for D-Mob in the video game of the same name. Several members of production crew made cameo appearances. Digital effects supervisor Bruce Woloshyn appears as the garage sale homeowner who sells Joe Spencer the Ancient stone device in "Citizen Joe". In the episode "Prometheus Unbound", Daniel introduces himself to two aliens as Hans Olo, a wordplay on the Star Wars character Han Solo.

In the episode "It's Good to be King", when arriving on the planet of which Harry Maybourne has become ruler, Carter mentions that the Tok'ra have said the planet's inhabitants are fairly primitive. In response Daniel says "No phones, no lights, no motorcars...", a reference to the TV show Gilligan's Island.

O'Neill's last line in "Moebius", "close enough", is an homage to The Simpsons episode "Treehouse of Horror V" that involves Homer Simpson time traveling and unintentionally making numerous changes to history; upon returning to a timeline where his family has snake tongues but everything else is otherwise normal, he says, "eh, close enough". In the same SG-1 episode, the name of O'Neill's boat is "Homer". There are also cross-references to events in SG-1's sister show Stargate Atlantis. In the episode "Threads", Daniel reads a paper with a headline "Wraith on the way to Atlantis". This piece is followed by a screenshot of the Atlantis Deep Space Scanner display from the Atlantis episode "The Brotherhood", showing the trio of hive ships that assaulted the city in the Atlantis episode "The Siege". In "Covenant" Alec Colson, played by actor Charles Shaughnessy, is introduced to "Captain Sheffield" upon entering the Alpha Site. This is in reference to Maxwell Sheffield, Shaughnessy's character from the sitcom The Nanny.

== Main cast ==
- Starring Richard Dean Anderson as Colonel/Brigadier General Jack O'Neill
- Amanda Tapping as Major/Lt. Colonel Samantha Carter
- With Christopher Judge as Teal'c
- And Michael Shanks as Dr. Daniel Jackson

== Episodes ==
Episodes in bold are continuous episodes, where the story spans over 2 or more episodes.

No. overall	No. in season	Title	Directed by	Written by	Original release date
155	1	"New Order"	Andy Mikita	Joseph Mallozzi & Paul Mullie	July 9, 2004
156	2	"New Order"	Andy Mikita	Robert C. Cooper	July 9, 2004
Three System Lords meet with the SGC after their defeat of Anubis. Carter is abducted by Fifth. The Asgard's new homeworld Orilla is endangered. O'Neill, with the help of the Asgard, is awakened and helps the Asgard in their fight with the Replicators using the knowledge of the Ancients that's still downloaded in his mind. Major Carter is released by Fifth. Jack is promoted to brigadier general and replaces Weir as commander of the SGC.
157	3	"Lockdown"	William Waring	Joseph Mallozzi & Paul Mullie	July 23, 2004
An outbreak of disease is in fact the effect of possession by the ethereal remains of Anubis. Anubis escapes the SGC through the Stargate, though Carter alters his destination to a frozen, barren planet.
158	4	"Zero Hour"	Peter F. Woeste	Robert C. Cooper	July 30, 2004
When SG-1 goes missing, Ba'al demands a ransom. After giving the SGC a booby-trapped ZPM, Camulus makes a deal to return to Ba'al on an assassination mission.
159	5	"Icon"	Peter F. Woeste	Damian Kindler	August 6, 2004
Tegalus is a world divided between two nations engaged in a cold war: the Rand Protectorate and the Caledonian Federation, both of which possess a large arsenal of ballistic missiles. When the SGC sends a MALP to Tegalus, religious fanatics who still worship the Goa'uld start a short-lived coup d'etat in the Rand Protectorate triggering a war.
160	6	"Avatar"	Martin Wood	Damian Kindler	August 13, 2004
Teal'c is trapped in a virtual reality training machine that delivers electrical shocks when he fails his objectives. Daniel enters the game in an attempt to save Teal'c from cardiac arrest and together they fight against the increasing difficulty of the game.
161	7 (Note: "Affinity" was originally written to air after "Covenant", but the episode order was switched for production reasons. This created slight continuity errors in regards to the naming of the Trust.)	"Affinity"	Peter DeLuise	Peter DeLuise	August 20, 2004
Teal'c moves into an off-base apartment, where he becomes involved with his neighbor, Krista, who has an abusive boyfriend. Teal'c is accused of murdering the boyfriend and Daniel disappears while trying to prove Teal'c is innocent.
162	8	"Covenant"	Martin Wood	Story by : Ron Wilkerson; Teleplay by : Ron Wilkerson & Robert C. Cooper	August 27, 2004
Alec Colson, the powerful leader of aerospace and biotech conglomerates, holds a press conference to announce that aliens exist, that they have already attacked Earth once, and that several governments are aware of this fact. Colson gives the governments involved 24 hours to tell the truth. When the time expires, he shows a living Asgard alien to the media.
163	9	"Sacrifices"	Andy Mikita	Christopher Judge	September 10, 2004
Rya'c plans to marry a woman of the Hak'tyl, which makes Teal'c angry. Ishta brings the Hak'tyl to the SGC because they believe that their location has been compromised. Carter attempts to find a suitable planet for them. The Goa'uld Moloc captures Ishta on a planet named Goronak. Ultimately Moloc is killed by missiles from the SGC, but his forces are taken over by Ba'al.
164	10	"Endgame"	Peter DeLuise	Joseph Mallozzi & Paul Mullie	September 17, 2004
Having recently acquired the Tok'ra symbiote poison, the Trust steal the Stargate and start using it to launch symbiote-poison attacks against Goa'uld-occupied planets, killing thousands of Jaffa in the process. Cut off from Earth, Teal'c arranges to be captured by undercover Tok'ra Zarin on P3S-114 to find out if the Tok'ra are behind the attacks. The Trust captures Carter and brings her aboard the Alkesh where the Stargate is, but she's rescued by Daniel and Teal'c who beam aboard and use the Stargate respectively. SG-1 and the Stargate are beamed aboard Prometheus and measures are taken to ensure it never happens again, but the Trust escapes.
165	11	"Gemini"	William Waring	Peter DeLuise	December 14, 2004 (Sky One); January 21, 2005 (Sci Fi)
RepliCarter informs the SGC that Fifth has made all Replicators immune to O'Neill's disruptor, and promises to help them modify the weapon. In fact, her presence was needed to develop the immunity. She destroys Fifth and escapes to lead the replicators.
166	12	"Prometheus Unbound"	Andy Mikita	Damian Kindler	December 21, 2004 (Sky One); January 28, 2005 (Sci Fi)
The crew of the Prometheus are incapacitated and removed, except Daniel, when it is hijacked by Vala, a pirate. Vala wishes to trade the ship for Naqahdah, but Daniel succeeds in retaking control of the ship and with the help of the crew in an Alkesh, fends off a Goa'uld attack that leaves Prometheus too badly damaged to finish the mission. Vala ultimately escapes in the end.
167	13	"It's Good to Be King"	William Gereghty	Story by : Michael Greenburg & Peter DeLuise & Joseph Mallozzi & Paul Mullie; Teleplay by : Joseph Mallozzi & Paul Mullie	January 4, 2005 (Sky One); February 4, 2005 (Sci Fi)
SG-1 finds that Harry Maybourne has become king on the planet where he took forced retirement. The planet is now under a Goa'uld threat, but Maybourne has found writings by a time-traveling Ancient that prophecy SG-1 will defeat the Goa'uld Ares. Ares sends Jaffa to the planet and comes in his mothership, but his forces are defeated by Daniel and Teal'c and his mothership is destroyed by O'Neill with the time traveling Puddle Jumper's weapons. Afterwards, Maybourne decides to remain on the planet with his people and his wives.
168	14	"Full Alert"	Andy Mikita	Joseph Mallozzi & Paul Mullie	January 11, 2005 (Sky One); February 11, 2005 (Sci Fi)
Russia and the United States reach DEFCON 1 because the Goa'uld may have compromised both governments via the Trust, which has been entirely assimilated. War is narrowly avoided when O'Neill convinces the Russian President of the truth and the Trust ship is destroyed by Prometheus, but the fate of Robert Kinsey is left unknown as he may or may not have been on the ship when it was destroyed.
169	15 (Note: Some DVD regions put "Citizen Joe" after the "Reckoning" two-parter and "Threads". "Citizen Joe" however comes before these episodes plotwise in regards to O'Neill's new girlfriend.)	"Citizen Joe"	Andy Mikita	Story by : Robert C. Cooper; Teleplay by : Damian Kindler; Excerpts written by : Robert C. Cooper, James Crocker, Peter DeLuise, Jonathan Glassner, V.C. James, Damian Kindler, Joseph Mallozzi, Paul Mullie, Brad Wright	January 18, 2005 (Sky One); February 18, 2005 (Sci Fi)
An Indiana barber who carries the ATA Gene has his life ruined when, through an Ancient device, he begins to have visions of SG-1's missions. His life is given back to him when O'Neill informs his nearly-divorced wife of what had been going on.
170	16	"Reckoning"	Peter DeLuise	Damian Kindler	January 25, 2005 (Sky One); February 25, 2005 (Sci Fi)
171	17	"Reckoning"	Peter DeLuise	Teleplay by : Damian Kindler; Excerpts written by : Robert C. Cooper	February 1, 2005 (Sky One); March 4, 2005 (Sci Fi)
Part 1: Teal'c is preparing the Jaffa rebellion to capture the Holy planet Dakara, where the first larval Goa'uld implantation took place. Daniel is abducted by RepliCarter so she can discover the location of the Dakara Superweapon in his subconscious. Ba'al also moves his forces to Dakara by the order of Anubis. Part 2: Struggling with RepliCarter, Daniel halts the Replicators long enough for Samantha Carter, Jacob Carter, and Ba'al to use a combination of the device that dials every Stargate in the galaxy and the Dakara Superweapon to destroy all Replicators. RepliCarter kills Daniel Jackson.
172	18 (Note: "Threads" original airing was 63 mins long; the original DVD version is cut to the standard 44 mins. The repackaged DVD restores the 63 min version.)	"Threads"	Andy Mikita	Teleplay by : Robert C. Cooper; Excerpts written by : Damian Kindler	February 8, 2005 (Sky One); March 11, 2005 (Sci Fi)
Daniel Jackson must choose death or powerless Ascension while Anubis plans to end all life in the galaxy using the Dakara Superweapon – until Oma Desala stops him. Jacob Carter and Selmak are in trouble. Daniel is returned to human form on Earth.
173	19	"Moebius"	Peter DeLuise	Story by : Joseph Mallozzi, Paul Mullie, Brad Wright & Robert C. Cooper; Teleplay by : Joseph Mallozzi & Paul Mullie	February 15, 2005 (Sky One); March 18, 2005 (Sci Fi)
174	20	"Moebius"	Peter DeLuise	Story by : Joseph Mallozzi, Paul Mullie, Brad Wright & Robert C. Cooper; Teleplay by : Robert C. Cooper	February 22, 2005 (Sky One); March 25, 2005 (Sci Fi)
Part 1: SG-1 uses an Ancient Puddle Jumper to time-travel back to ancient Egypt to recover a ZPM. However, they cause Ra to take the Stargate at Giza with him when he leaves Earth, stranding the team and altering the future so the SGC doesn't exist. Part 2: An alternate-reality SG-1 must go back in time and fix the past to save the future. In the process, the team must re-recruit Teal'c and find the real Daniel Jackson, who is still in ancient Egypt. Alternate-timeline O'Neill and Carter express their love.

== Home releases ==
DVD name	Region 1	Region 2 (UK)	Region 4
Stargate SG-1 Complete Season 8	October 3, 2006	February 5, 2007	August 16, 2006
Vol. 38 (4 eps.)	—	March 27, 2006	—
Vol. 39 (4 eps.)	—	April 24, 2006	—
Vol. 40 (3 eps.)	—	May 22, 2006	—
Vol. 41 (3 eps.)	—	June 19, 2006	—
Vol. 42 (3 eps.)	—	July 17, 2006	—
Vol. 43 (3 eps.)	—	August 14, 2006	—
