= Citizen Joe =

- Stargate SG-1 episode
- Episode no.: Season 8 Episode 15
- Directed by: Andy Mikita
- Written by: Robert C. Cooper
- Production code: 815
- Original air date: January 8, 2005

Guest appearances
- Dan Castellaneta as Joe Spencer; Deborah Theaker as Charlene Spencer; Alex Ferris as Andy Spencer; Mark Hansen as Older Andy Spencer; Eric Keenleyside as Fred; Louis Chirillo as Bert Simmons; Chad Krowchuk as Gordie Lowe; Andy Thompson as Calvin; Beatrice Zeilinger as Cindy

Episode chronology
← Previous "Full Alert"	Next → "Reckoning"
- Stargate SG-1 (season 8)

"Citizen Joe" is the fifteenth episode for season eight of the Canadian-American military science fiction television series Stargate SG-1. The episode features known voice actor Dan Castellaneta, who voices Homer Simpson in The Simpsons. The episode was written by executive producer Robert C. Cooper, the episode was directed by Andy Mikita. The episode received a below average Nielsen household rating and received no syndication rating to compare. The episode got strong reviews from major media publishers worldwide.

"Citizen Joe" follows an Indiana barber (portrayed by Dan Castellaneta) who carries the Ancient Technology Activation gene (ATA Gene) and has his life ruined when, through an Ancient device, he begins to have visions of SG-1's missions from season one to season eight. His life is given back to him when Jack O'Neill informs his nearly divorced wife of what had been going on. This episode is a clip show.

== Plot ==
The episode opens with Jack O'Neill walking into his kitchen, talking on the phone to Samantha Carter about his "world famous omelette", when a man O'Neill has never met bursts in with a gun claiming that O'Neill has ruined his life. The viewer is then taken to a flashback 7 years earlier where Joe, the man in O'Neill's house, is at a garage sale and picks up a mysterious black stone. When he does, he receives a vision of SG-1 going through the Stargate against orders in the season 1 episode "Within the Serpent's Grasp". He buys the stone and, as the episode progresses, continuously receives more and more visions of the exploration team.

Joe, unable to create or tell amusing jokes or stories of his own, tells of the visions he sees as if they were stories he had conjured out of thin air. To start with, he tells these visions to his son and the customers in his barbershop, entertaining them where he had previously been nothing but a bore. Later, at the suggestion of his wife, he starts to write them down and send them in to various magazines (all of which reject them) instead of telling each and every individual the tiniest of details relating to SG-1. As the episode goes on, skipping ahead in years, the people he tells start to get tired of the tales of SG-1 and, eventually, they stop coming to his barbershop. Despite his wife's urging, telling him to stop writing the episodes down, he continues to type and becomes convinced that the visions are actually happening. After years of too-intense focus on SG-1, long since passed into obsession, his wife leaves with their son. At this point he tries to find evidence that what he has been seeing is real, collecting data on mysterious stellar phenomenon and unexplained deaths, but is unable to contact Colonel O'Neill. Eventually, he tracks down where O'Neill lives, bringing the viewer to the opening scene.

It is then discovered that the reason Joe has been seeing the visions, flashes of the life of Jack O'Neill, is because of an Ancient long-range communication device brought back from P3R-233. The device, which was activated by O'Neill when he touched a mysterious black stone in Daniel Jackson's lab, connects two minds together telepathically and Joe, who possesses the same Ancient gene as O'Neill, activated the companion device when he touched the stone at the garage sale. That stone, we find out, was discovered by the grandfather of the garage sales operator and had been found at a dig in Egypt. When Jack had been on the base, writing his mission reports of their off-world adventures, the stone in Daniel's lab transmitted his thoughts to Joe. Conversely, O'Neill had been seeing visions of Joe's everyday life periodically, as the two devices could work in either direction; Jack never said anything because he found the visions "relaxing." At the close of the episode O'Neill helps Joe start to piece his life back together by personally talking to Joe's wife. Just as the camera pans out, O'Neill begins by telling Joe and his wife that "it's all true".

== Production ==
Castellaneta, portraying Joe Spencer in this episode, is the voice actor of Homer Simpson on The Simpsons, which had been established as O'Neill's favorite television program. Joe mentions that he sees O'Neill's analogy of The Simpsons character Montgomery Burns as the Stargate SG-1 characters, the Goa'uld. Anderson, at a 2023 Prague Comic-Con interview, revealed that The Simpsons was a favorite show and that Castellaneta invited him to guest star, and as such, was subsequently featured on the 2006 The Simpsons episode "Kiss Kiss, Bang Bangalore", written by Castellaneta.

On the European and Australian Stargate SG-1 DVD releases of Season 8, "Citizen Joe" was the 18th episode, instead of the 15th of airtime order. The previous episode to "Citizen Joe" was "Full Alert" and the next episode is "Moebius Part 1" on the DVDs. Only the Region 1 DVD set has a commentary for this episode. Jonas Quinn (portrayed by Corin Nemec) is mentioned in this episode for the first time since "Death Knell". Bruce Woloshyn (digital effects supervisor) appears in a cameo as the garage sale homeowner who sells Joe Spencer the Ancient stone device.
