= Major General West =

Fictional character in the Stargate SG-1 universe

Major General West is a fictional character in the Stargate SG-1 universe, played by Leon Rippy. West headed the USAF's Project Giza (also known as the Stargate Project), the forerunner of the SGC. He oversaw Dr. Catherine Langford's experiments with the Stargate until selecting, recalling, and delegating Colonel Jack O'Neil as military commander when Dr. Daniel Jackson joined the team. Upon the successful connection of the Earth Stargate to Abydos, West immediately militarized the program and locked out most of the civilian team previously under Dr. Langford. He then authorized the initial excursion to Abydos (in the original movie).

== History ==
A United States Air Force officer with experience in the Vietnam War and Southeast Asia (Gulf War I), Major General West wears the wings of a senior pilot and a rather uninformative rack of ribbons. He is a qualified expert with small arms and has served at least six months in Viet Nam.

He has prior experience with Colonel Jack O'Neil, both trusting his judgment and his military expertise while having enough emotional distance from the man to select him for a suicide mission. He also knew Jack well enough to ask about his wife by name.

The book describes him as a "stern soldier about fifty years old" (putting his birthday around 1940) and states the following:

"Respected and feared by all who served under him, West was famous for three things: for always making the right decisions under pressure, for erupting into superhuman fits of rage when his orders were not executed exactly as he wished, and for being the best damn poker player in any branch of the armed forces." (Stargate novelization p. 56)

== Ribbons and Medals ==
- Senior Pilot Wings
- Air Force Distinguished Service Medal
- United States Meritiorious Service Medal (with one or more clusters)
- Air Force Commendation Medal
- Air Force Achievement Medal
- Air Force Organizational Excellence Award
- National Defense Service Medal
- Vietnam Service Medal
- Southwest Asia Service Medal (device?)
- Air Force Overseas Short Tour
- Air Force Longevity Service Award (with 2 clusters of unknown type)
- Small Arms Expert Marksmanship Ribbon
- Air Force Training Ribbon
- Republic of Vietnam Campaign Medal

== Trivia ==
Leon Rippy, who played General West, is a character actor who appears in many movies by Dean Devlin and Roland Emmerich.

Preceded by None	SGC Commander; 199?–1996	Succeeded by Major General George Hammond
