= Stargate (device) =

Portal device within the Stargate fictional universe

- Stargate franchise element
- A Stargate from Stargate SG-1
- First appearance: Stargate; 1994
- Genre: Science fiction

In-universe information
- Type: Wormhole
- Function: Interstellar travel

A Stargate is a fictional Einstein–Rosen bridge portal device within the Stargate fictional universe that allows practical, point-to-point near instantaneous travel between two distant locations with an "address". The devices first appeared in the 1994 Roland Emmerich film Stargate, and thereafter in the television series Stargate SG-1, Stargate Infinity, Stargate Atlantis, Stargate Universe, and Stargate Origins, as well as the television films Stargate: The Ark of Truth and Stargate: Continuum. In these productions, the Stargate functions as a plot device, allowing the main characters to visit alien planets without the need for spaceships or any other type of technology. The device allows for near-instantaneous teleportation across both interstellar and extragalactic distances.

== Concept ==
Some early "portal" appearances in science fiction include A. E. van Vogt's novella Secret Unattainable (July 1942, Astounding), a radio episode of Space Patrol that aired October 25, 1952 (in which it was called a "cycloplex" or a "hole in space"), and Robert A. Heinlein's Tunnel in the Sky (1955) and its "Ramsbotham jump". In 2001: A Space Odyssey, Arthur C. Clarke uses the term "Star Gate" for the large monolith "sentinel" TMA-2, which is a classic stargate portal to another part of the universe.

The basic stargate concept is that it has at least two devices in distant positions, and when active, the rings of each become similar to a physical, singular gateway or door-frame between the two locations. The concept was developed by the writers of the feature film Stargate, Dean Devlin and Roland Emmerich. Similar devices had been seen in previous fiction, and there has been contention as to whether they plagiarized the idea from a previous script submission from a student of Egyptology named Omar Zuhdi, who submitted a screenplay to them about ten years before the movie was made. Zuhdi pursued legal action regarding this, and the case was eventually settled out of court.

Much of the inspiration for the functioning of the device is drawn heavily from theoretical astrophysics, particularly that of black holes and wormholes, a staple of science fiction, often used to create "shortcuts" through space. Although these may exist in reality, it is not widely held to be true that any such phenomenon could safely transport a human being, as such wormholes would most likely be created by excessive gravity (e.g., from a black hole), which would destroy any potential traveler.

== Plot ==
=== Films ===
The Stargate film begins in 1928, when the alien device is first discovered and unearthed at Giza, with a young Catherine Langford watching as her father Paul, the archaeologist who found it, directs its unearthing. Stargate SG-1 has since revealed more of the backstory of the Earth Stargate. The American ship Achilles brought the gate to America in 1939 to prevent it from falling into the hands of the Nazis. The United States Air Force then stored the device in various locations —including Washington, DC—before installing it at its location of the film and series. The Stargate was studied in the 1940s as a potential weapon and was later mothballed. As the Stargate film quickly skips to the "present day" (1994), unsuccessful archaeologist Daniel Jackson is giving a lecture about his outlandish theories that the pharaoh Khufu did not build the Great Pyramid of Giza. After he is laughed away, an aged Catherine Langford meets with him and recruits his egyptological talent, taking him to a top-secret military base at Cheyenne Mountain, where he is instructed to decipher the unique Egyptian hieroglyphs present on a set of cover-stones. He realizes that the indecipherable glyphs are not actually words but images of constellations, such that by identifying 6 of them a position in space can be extrapolated. He is then shown the stargate itself, uses his new understanding to identify the 7th symbol (the point of origin allowing a route to be extrapolated), and the gate is opened for the first time.

Because thousands of combinations had been previously tried and had failed, it was believed at the time that only two stargates existed, connecting Earth and the planet Abydos, which was visited in the film and was at the time erroneously believed to be located in the Kaliam Galaxy, billions of light years away on the other side of the known universe. At the beginning of the Stargate SG-1 series, however, a large set of additional valid coordinates were discovered engraved in ruins on Abydos. Because of the stellar drift accumulated over millions of years, other addresses were impossible to dial until Samantha Carter reworked the dialing system on Earth to account for this movement. After this, a massive network of possible connections suddenly became available. Even more addresses were later uncovered by Colonel Jack O'Neill from a repository of Ancient knowledge. In order to allow for dialing back to Earth from other locations (without altering the dialing system), it was later stated that the DHD ("Dial-Home Device") normally attached to each stargate automatically updates for stellar drift; Earth's stargate lacks its DHD, requiring other accommodation.

The alien race encountered in the original movie is later developed in SG-1 as the Goa'uld, the dominant evil power in the Milky Way. The leaders of this race, the System Lords, pose as gods and use the stargates to transport slaves between worlds. This has resulted in a large number of planets throughout the galaxy supporting human life, often in civilizations more primitive than Earth. The majority of these civilizations, descended from former Goa'uld slaves, treat the Stargate as a religious relic, often as a source of long-forgotten fear and evil.

Direct-to-video films Stargate: The Ark of Truth (2008) and Stargate: Continuum (also 2008) expand upon the Stargate lore.

=== Television ===
For most of the run of Stargate SG-1, Earth was under constant threat from the Goa'uld, and is no match for their superior technology. In the face of this threat, the US Air Force established a top-secret base, the SGC (Stargate Command), as a frontline defence. Multiple teams are formed and sent on missions through the stargate, their primary objective being exploration, and through it the discovery of intelligence, technology and allies to help in the fight against the Goa'uld. The primary team is called SG-1, and the series follows their adventures.

For a long time, it was thought that the Goa'uld were the builders of the Stargate network, but it was later discovered that they had merely made use of the relics left behind by a different and extinct race, the Ancients. At the climax of SG-1's 6th season, Daniel Jackson discovers that the Earth myth of Atlantis is in fact founded on the Lost City of the Ancients, and Season 7 is spent trying to locate it. At the beginning of the show Stargate Atlantis, which coincides with the beginning of SG-1's 8th season, the city is found in the Pegasus Galaxy, and 8 chevrons are dialed to send an expedition there on what could be a one-way trip, due to the massive power required to generate a wormhole to another galaxy. It is there that they discover a new network of stargates, and are plagued by the nemesis of the Ancients, the Wraith. During the events of The Ark of Truth, it is revealed that the pre-ascended Ancient known as Amelius originated the concept of the Stargate and wormhole travel.

In the events of the third television series, Stargate Universe, a third generation of stargates is discovered, which allegedly predates the model originally discovered in the Milky Way galaxy. This model, discovered as a result of a three-month expedition to unlock the stargate's ninth and final chevron, was first encountered on board the ancient research vessel Destiny, which has been traversing the universe for several million years uncrewed, and is several billion light years away from Earth. It is discovered that the Ancients constructed the vessel to be launched after a number of stargate seed ships were dispersed in the universe in order to follow in their path and stop at each planet at which a stargate was deposited. Destiny would then extract any relevant data from the planetary stargate in order to further complete research into an apparent signal embedded in the Cosmic microwave background radiation. This "prototype", or "beta", generation of gates has a limited range; one storyline in the series saw an exploratory team being left behind when Destiny jumped into hyperspace without them, requiring them to plot the ship's course and travel to various other "beta" Stargates until they found one in range of Destiny. In addition, when a dialing sequence commences, the entire ring (as opposed to an inner track, like Milky Way-era gates) rotates clockwise and counterclockwise in an alternating pattern until the final chevron is locked and a wormhole is established. Finally, the event horizon of the wormhole also appears a slightly more silver color than later generations. Possibly due to the nature of how these stargates were deposited on hundreds of thousands of planets, no planetary DHD is present. Rather, explorers from Destiny are required to bring an Ancient remote control that can command the gate to dial an address in addition to other functions, presenting them with a list of accessible Stargates.

== Operation ==
The final chevron in the series

Within the Stargate fictional universe, stargates are hyper-advanced large rings that allow interplanetary and intergalactic travel. Objects can travel only from the origin to the destination, while certain electromagnetic waves can travel either way (for instance, visible light does not pass through at all, but radio transmissions pass in both directions).

A stargate's destination is not fixed; any stargate can connect to any other stargate in the network. Stargates have an inner ring akin to a rotary dial inscribed with a number of symbols, and nine prominent points ("chevrons") spaced equally around their circumference. Between 7 and 9 symbols are combined to identify a destination, by assigning them to each of the chevrons in sequence. These "addresses" are selected by turning the ring until the next symbol in the address is correctly aligned, which associates it with the next chevron. The 8th chevron, if used, specifies a different galaxy; the first 6 chevrons identify points in space within that galaxy to triangulate a physical location; the 7th is a symbol unique to the specific gate, which identifies it as the point of origin; and the 9th is reserved for special destinations.

The gates were originally constructed with complementary control panels nearby, inscribed with the same symbols as can be found on the ring. Pressing these symbols would supply power to the gate and cause the inner ring to spin automatically until the selected symbol is aligned and the chevron engaged. However the gate can also be dialled by manually forcing the ring to move into each position.

Once a valid address is dialed by the traveler, if a functioning counterpart device exists close enough to those coordinates, the stargate generates a stable wormhole between itself and its counterpart.

The advanced technology of the stargate allows it to accept a wide range of power sources, which it can absorb by direct conduction if required. The power source in most situations is provided by the control panel, which contains a long-lasting power source.

Objects in transit between gates are broken down into their individual elemental components, and then into energy as they pass through the event horizon, and then travel through a wormhole before being reconstructed on the other side. The journey takes a few seconds, even for the greatest distances. Objects passing between stargates behave as if they pass through a doorway; momentum, for instance, is conserved at either end of the wormhole.

Human travellers exit the stargate with a sense of the journey that has been traversed. This normally feels effortless, but if the stargate has been improperly operated or is not functioning correctly, can be an uncomfortable experience.

=== Addresses ===
Each location in the Stargate universe has its own unique "address", which is a combination of six or more non-repeating symbols appearing on the dialing stargate. By "dialing" these symbols in the correct order, the traveler selects a three-dimensional destination.

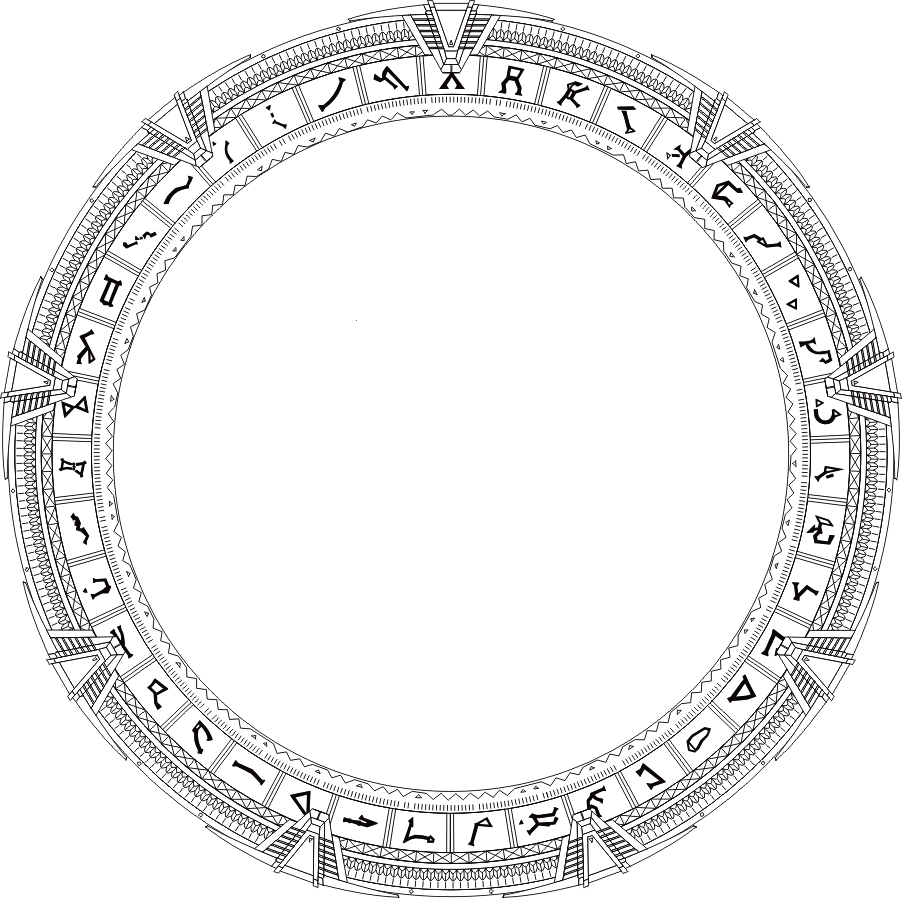
Schematic diagram of a Milky Way stargate with glyphs

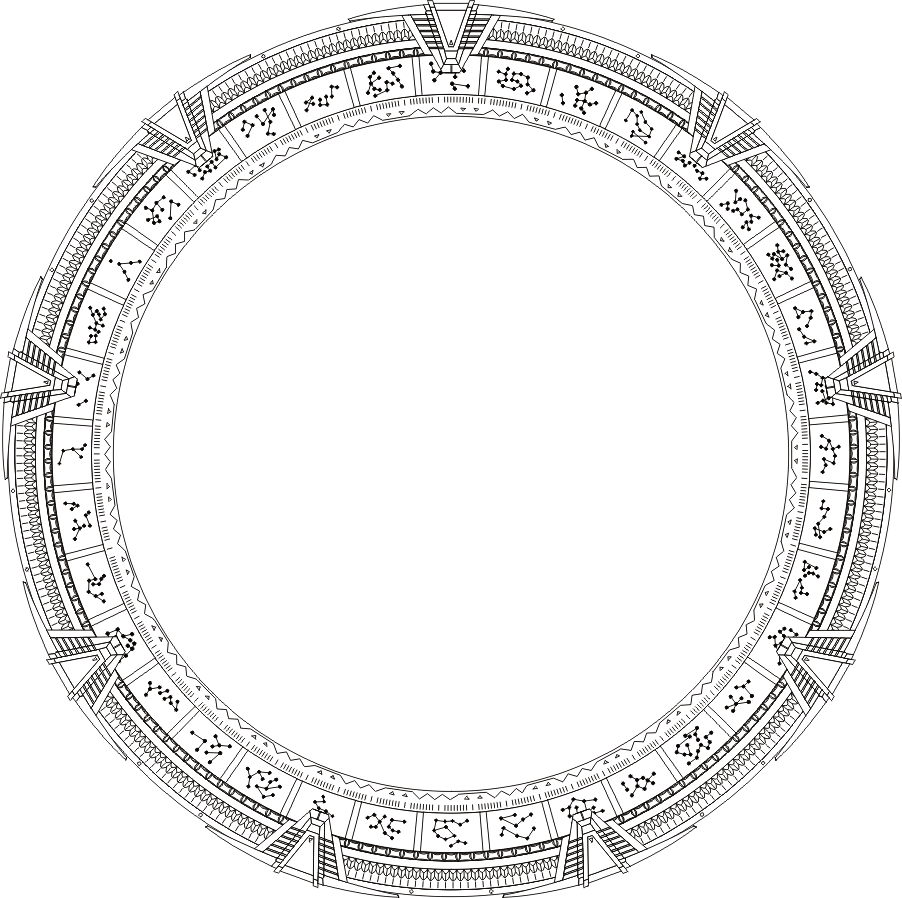
Schematic diagram of a Pegasus stargate with glyphs

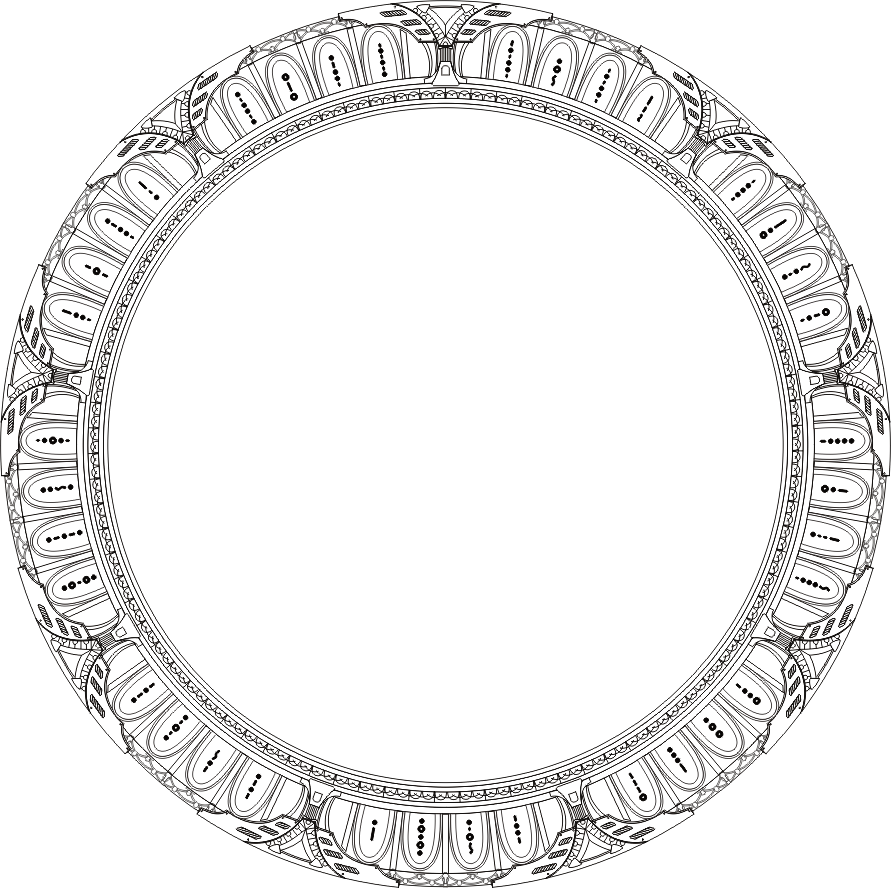
Schematic diagram of Destiny's stargate with glyphs

The SGC's Dialing Computer compiling the address of the planet Abydos

The symbols dialed are often referred to as "coordinates", and are written as an ordered string; for example, this is the address used in the show for the planet Abydos: (corresponding to the constellations of Taurus, Serpens Caput, Capricornus, Monoceros, Sagittarius and Orion). As explained by Dr. Daniel Jackson in the movie, the Stargate requires seven correct symbols to connect to another Stargate. As shown in the picture opposite, the first six symbols act as coordinates, creating three intersecting lines, the destination. The Stargate uses the seventh symbol as the point of origin allowing one to plot a straight line course to the destination. With the stargates of the Milky Way, with 38 address symbols and one point of origin, there are 1,987,690,320 possible six symbol co-ordinates (leading to 38!/(38-6)!/8/6=41,410,215 addresses as the six symbol addresses are composed of three tuples that can be permuted in 6 ways and the two symbols within each tuple are invariant for 8 more permutations.). With the stargates of the Pegasus or Destiny, with 35 address symbols and one point of origin, there are only 1,168,675,200 possible six symbol coordinates.

This diagram illustrates how Stargate symbols translate to physical coordinates.

By identifying six constellations in space, a single sextangulation point can be interpolated that corresponds to the destination desired. As only a small portion of the possible combinations of Stargate symbols represent valid addresses, dialing the Gate at random is largely futile. In "Children of the Gods", SG-1 discovers a room on Abydos with a list of valid Stargate addresses and (luckily) a map that allows the SGC to compensate for thousands of years of stellar drift. In the series, the fictional planet Abydos could be dialed because it is relatively close to Earth, although in the film, Abydos was located in the fictional Kaliam Galaxy. It was initially believed that the Goa'uld created the Stargates, but this was proven false in "The Torment of Tantalus" when the SGC discovered that Earth had accidentally dialled an address in 1945 that was not on the Abydos cartouche. Following this revelation, a larger list of Stargate addresses is provided by Jack O'Neill in "The Fifth Race" from knowledge downloaded into his mind by a repository of the Ancients, allowing them to travel to worlds unknown to the Goa'uld. In "Rising", a list of Stargate addresses in the Pegasus galaxy is found in the Atlantis database. The SGC assigns designations to Stargate-accessible planets in the form Pxx-xxx or Mxx-xxx. Samantha Carter explains in "The Broca Divide" that the designation "is based on a binary code the computer uses for extrapolation".

Eight-symbol addresses are introduced in "The Fifth Race", opening up new plot lines by connecting Stargates to different galaxies. The additional symbol acts as a type of "area code". Such connections, in comparison to seven symbol codes, require substantially more energy to complete a functional wormhole – much more than any standard dialing method can provide. In the first instance, opening an intergalactic wormhole is shown to exceed the total power generation capacity of the SGC at the time. O'Neill fashioned an additional power source using spare parts and the liquid naquadah power core of a staff weapon using the same enhanced knowledge that had allowed him to determine this address in the first place, but this new power source only functioned twice and required repair work to operate the second time. A fully charged Zero Point Module (ZPM) can provide enough power for regular travel between galaxies. The 8th chevron is a key element in the Stargate Atlantis series, allowing travel to the Pegasus Galaxy. For the stargates of the Milky Way, with 38 address symbols and one point of origin, there are 63,606,090,240 possible seven symbol coordinates. The stargates of the Pegasus or Destiny, with 35 address symbols and one point of origin, provide only 33,891,580,800 possible seven symbol coordinates.

Stargate Universe introduces the concept of a nine-symbol address, the purpose of the ninth chevron never having been explored in the previous series. The nine-symbol addresses act as codes to dial specific Stargates, with the only two known nine-symbol addresses used to dial from the Milky Way galaxy to Destiny, a massive Ancient vessel that was part of a project to explore the universe, with the project being abandoned when they started researching into ascension among other things, and from Destiny to Earth. It is unknown if any other Stargates are reachable with a nine-symbol address, or if this is a feature unique to the Stargates on Destiny and Earth. Like eight-symbol addresses, the dialing of this address requires a significant amount of power, such that the scientists on Icarus Base had to tap into the planet's naqahdriah core. With the Stargates of the Milky Way, with 38 address symbols, there are 1,971,788,797,440 possible eight-symbol destinations. With the Stargates of the Pegasus or Destiny, with 35 address symbols, there are only 948,964,262,400 possible eight symbol destinations. Provided the ninth symbol is your point of origin. If the ninth symbol can also be added to the destination, even 59,153,663,923,200 combinations with a Milky Way stargate or 25,622,035,084,800 combinations with a Pegasus or Destiny Stargate are possible.

=== Dial-Home Device ===
The Dial-Home Device

There are a handful of methods used in the shows to dial a Stargate, and the most common is with the use of a Dial-Home Device. Almost always referred to as the "DHD" for short, it is depicted as a pedestal-shaped device with a round inclined control panel on top, consisting of two concentric circles of "keys" and a translucent red (Milky Way) or blue (Pegasus) hemisphere in the center; the keys represent the symbols on the rim of the Stargate. By pressing these keys a traveler builds an address. The central hemisphere serves as an "Enter" key to activate the Stargate once a destination has been dialed. Each DHD only has 38 keys, 19 on each ring. According to Dr. Zelenka, dialing an address leaves a small imprint on the control crystals of the DHD, and about fifty addresses can be recovered from a DHD using the proper equipment. However, this gives no indication of the order in which the addresses were dialed, and no guarantee can be made as to the accuracy of the recovered addresses.

Milky Way Puddle Jumper DHD console

The Atlantis DHD is more similar to the Earth's dialing computer than an actual DHD, and looks more like a set of crystal panels. It can block out certain gate addresses. The Atlantis DHD also has an extra control-crystal allowing the dialing of an eighth chevron during the dialing sequence and is the only DHD in the Pegasus Galaxy capable of dialing Earth. A similar DHD is also used on Puddle Jumpers, where the set of used glyphs corresponds to the galaxy of the Puddle Jumper. The Wraith also travel through Stargates in small spacecraft called darts and have some means of remote-dialing them in a manner similar to Ancient ships.

The show makes it clear that every Stargate originally had its own DHD, located directly in front of the gate and facing it. Over time, however, some DHDs have been damaged or lost. This has been the source of plot difficulties for the protagonists on several occasions, as it is still possible to travel to a Stargate that lacks a DHD, meaning that dialing home again will be much more difficult, if not impossible. One of the primary functions of the Mobile Analytic Laboratory Probe (M.A.L.P.), an unmanned ground vehicle that precedes an SG team, is to confirm the presence of a DHD. In the absence of a DHD, a user must select the address by manually rotating the inner ring of the Stargate, and use an external power source, as the ring will not rotate unless it is energised. Pegasus Galaxy Stargates do not have a movable ring, so manually dialing these is impossible. Travelers can also emulate a DHD through a dialing computer as present at Stargate Command. Remote dialers have been used by several races like the Goa'uld and Asgard in various episodes. As the Stargates in Stargate Universe are a different (less advanced model) the crew of the Destiny are forced to use such a device as no planet visited so far has any variation of DHD present.

=== Wormhole ===
Side-on view of a stargate as an unstable vortex is ejected

Once an address is dialed, the gate is said to have created a "stable wormhole" between itself and the gate dialed. The creation process is depicted with great consistency, and hence has become one of the defining motifs of Stargate, at times being central in both the SG-1 and Atlantis title sequences. It involves the generation of the "puddle of water" portal that lasts roughly two seconds, and is completed by the ejection of an unstable energy vortex resembling a surge of water or quicksilver. The vortex is portrayed as a symbol of the stargate's power, invariably causing characters to become affected by awe. Any matter that comes into contact with the vortex is annihilated on a molecular level, as is dramatically demonstrated by a pair of smoking shoes in the episode "Prisoners". In season 9's "Crusade", the unstable vortex was onomatopoeidiacally referred to by Col. Carter as the "Kawoosh", emulating the sound of the initial vortex. This aspect has been used in some cases to dispose of highly hazardous materials. The vortex is also used on one occasion to dispose of a body in a formal funeral service – the body was placed on a pyre in front of the gate, which was then activated.

The actual portal of a Stargate appears inside the inner ring when an address is correctly dialed. This has the appearance of a vertical puddle of water, which represents the "event horizon" in the show. In non-fictional parlance, an event horizon is the perimeter around a black hole or wormhole beyond which the gravitational pull of the singularity would be too strong to overcome. The wavering undulations characteristic of water are supposed to represent the "fluctuations in the event horizon". This puddle may then be entered (usually accompanied by a watery squishing sound), and the traveler will emerge from a similar pool at the destination Stargate.

The show makes it clear that transit is strictly one-way; an attempt to travel "backwards" causes the traveler to be destroyed. Although in the first episode the Goa'uld who come through at the beginning appear to walk back through the event horizon after taking a hostage, in actuality they dialed out again using a hand-held device, as the whooshing sound is audible in the background. As matter is only transmitted through a Stargate once the whole object has passed the event horizon, a person or object could be retrieved from the event horizon before entering completely, as the Stargate would automatically reintegrate the traveler.

Original wormhole travel from the Stargate movie and SG-1 seasons 1-8

Passage through a Stargate's wormhole is depicted as a visual effect of shooting through a tunnel in space. The average travel time between Stargates is 3.2 seconds. In the movie and early SG-1 episodes, travelers exit from the Stargate covered in frost and at high speed (often being knocked from their feet), feeling as though they have been on a "roller coaster ride". The character Major Charles Kawalsky describes Stargate travel as worse than "pulling out of a simulated bombing run in an F-16 at eight-plus g", with Major Louis Ferretti adding that on the other side one is "frozen stiff like having just been through a blizzard naked". In later episodes the experience is no different from stepping through a door, explained as a result of refinements made to the dialing computer at the SGC.

Under normal circumstances, a wormhole can only be maintained for slightly more than 38 minutes. Extending the wormhole duration beyond that requires tremendous amounts of power, such as that provided by a nearby black hole.

While the "kawoosh" effect in the movie was created by filming the actual swirl of water in a glass tube, and looked like a vortex on the back of the Gate, on the TV series, this effect was completely created in CG by the Canadian visual effects company Rainmaker. At the beginning of Season 9, the original movie wormhole sequence was substituted by a new sequence similar to the one already used on Stargate Atlantis but tinted bright blue (whereas in Atlantis it is green). Stargate Universe uses a darker shade of blue.

Throughout the run of the television franchise, it cost $5,000 to show a person stepping through the event horizon, using visual effects.

== Other variants ==
- Orlin's Stargate In the Stargate SG-1 episode "Ascension", the outcast Ancient, Orlin, builds a miniature Stargate in Samantha Carter's basement. Its stated components included 100 pounds of pure raw titanium, 200 feet (61 m) of fiber optic cable, seven 100,000 watt industrial strength capacitors, and a toaster. This gate was hooked up to the main power supply of the house and only connected once, to Velona, before burning out.
- Tollan Stargate In "Pretense", the advanced Tollan civilization is shown to have a new Stargate, built with the assistance of the Nox. Jack O'Neill sarcastically mocks the Tollan gate, saying "Ours is bigger". The Tollan Stargate is destroyed by the Goa'uld in "Between Two Fires".
- Ori "Supergate" In the ninth season of Stargate SG-1, the Ori were introduced as the new main enemy for the show. The Ori employ extremely large Stargates to move their fleet of warships from their home galaxy to the Milky Way. Dubbed "Supergates", these devices are composed of 90 individual segments and are powered by a quantum singularity.
- McKay-Carter Intergalactic Gate Bridge Introduced in season 3 of Stargate Atlantis, the Gate Bridge is a chain of Stargates placed between the Milky Way and the Pegasus galaxies, allowing movement between Atlantis and Earth without the need for a ZPM or the Daedalus. Halfway along the Bridge is Midway Station, where travelers switch from one galaxy's gate system to the other. The Bridge is hijacked by the Wraith in the episode "Midway", and the Midway Station is destroyed as a result of Wraith tampering in the control systems. As a result of the destruction of the Midway Station, the gate bridge has since become inoperative.
- Asuran satellite weapon In the Stargate Atlantis season 3 finale, "First Strike", the Asurans send a satellite weapon to attack Atlantis in response to the Apollo's bombing of their homeworld. The weapon consists of an eight-chevron Stargate, hyperdrive, shield, and a navigation system. Once it reaches its target, the Stargate activates and the Asurans fire an energy beam through.
- The Stargate Atlantis series finale demonstrates the wormhole drive, essentially taking the Stargate concept and applying it to an interstellar vessel. The drive allows Atlantis to move from the edge of the Milky Way galaxy to Earth in moments, similar to a Stargate, but uses a tremendous amount of power. It also requires precise calculation to successfully arrive at the target destination without destroying the ship.

== Making of the props ==
Two full Stargate props were originally built for the SG-1 pilot "Children of the Gods", the second of which was reconstructed from the prop used in the film. They are made of steel and fiberglass, and are 22 feet (6.7 m) in diameter. The second prop is less detailed, and is used for exterior scenes; in the pilot it was used solely on the planet Chulak. The primary one is fully automated and capable of rotating and emitting light. This is achieved by the use of a specially designed 22-foot (6.7 m) circular gear, which turns the inner ring on a precise pinion drive wheel, using an eight horsepower electric motor. The top seven chevrons emit laser pulses that are read by a sensor fed into a computer responsible for the gate's movement, which is consequently able to start and stop the rotation very quickly. This main prop is kept almost immovably at the permanent set of the SGC, at Bridge Studios, Vancouver.

There are further Stargate props that are no more than two-dimensional or semi-three-dimensional (jar-lid shaped) Stargates, being more lightweight and easier to erect on location. These are always filmed front-on to preserve the illusion. If a shot involves the iris, this is added in post-production, as the mechanics of it opening and closing would be very difficult to build. However, when a Stargate is filmed with just a closed iris (i.e. without it moving), a tangible prop is inserted into place.

The visual effects for Stargate SG-1 and Stargate Atlantis are predominantly produced by Rainmaker Digital Effects, a notable visual-effects studio. However, some effects, including the entire Ori battle sequence in the episode "Camelot", were done "in-house". The unstable vortex effect, both in the film and the early seasons of the series, on account of being "difficult to achieve" was generated only once and recorded from various angles; this recording was the same used for all gate opening shots early in the series. Rather than being a jet of water, it is actually the image of high-pressure air being blasted into a tank of water. The effect was achieved by mounting a jet airplane engine two feet above a water tank, and using its 180 mph (290 km/h) windstream to create the sufficient water displacement. In post production, the surrounding water was removed with computer editing, and the image of the air-jet pasted into the center of the opening stargate. This technique was only used for earlier episodes, and the effect was replicated digitally soon after to allow more flexibility in shots.

To cut down on costs, the opening of a Stargate is often just implied rather than shown, by a costless sound-effect followed by distinct lighting effects characteristic of light shining through water (as the event horizon is depicted). The DVD commentary for Stargate SG-1 explains that these effects are produced by reflecting light off large sheets of vibrating Mylar.

An orbital Stargate in the Pegasus galaxy, with 3 station-keeping rocket packs attached evenly around the rim

The Stargate itself is nearly always filmed against a blue or green backdrop, not only making it easier to paste the vortex imagery onto the scene, but also facilitating the superimposition of the "event horizon ripple effect", which is entirely computer-generated. However, if a shot only involves an open wormhole without anyone stepping through it, the crew may choose to use a "practical puddle," which is simply a backlit screen placed in the gate displaying a video of the wormhole effect. This only works, however, on a darker set, as otherwise the projection will get washed out. On occasion, the Stargate itself is also completely swapped out for a computer generated model, usually in cases where it is being moved, or is depicted in space. Series producer Robert C. Cooper explained that it often costs a lot to erect a Stargate on location, and so in some cases offworld gates are also entirely a visual effect.

== See also ==
- Stargate Origins
