= Rainmaker Digital Effects =

Defunct visual effects company

- Industry: Visual Effects; Computer Animation
- Founded: 1993
- Founder: Gavin Blair; Ian Pearson; Phil Mitchell
- Defunct: November 29, 2007; 17 years ago
- Fate: visual effects and post production divisions sold to Deluxe Media Inc.; animation division (Rainmaker Entertainment) is now a subsidiary of Wow Unlimited Media, as a result of a triple acquisition and merger with Frederator Studios and Ezrin-Hirsh Entertainment (EHE).
- Successors: Rainmaker Entertainment (now Mainframe Studios); Method Studios
- Headquarters: Vancouver, Canada
- Parent: Rainmaker Income Fund (1993–2007); Deluxe Media Inc. (2007–2008)

Rainmaker was a visual effects and post-production company headquartered in Vancouver, Canada, with an office in Los Angeles, California, United States, which contributed to the final works for feature films, television shows, commercials and video games. It acquired and folded into Mainframe Studios in 2007.

== History ==
Vancouver-based post-production firm Rainmaker Income Fund which owned Rainmaker Digital Effects announced its acquisition of a 62% stake in Mainframe Entertainment from IDT Corporation on 20 July 2006 for $13.8 million. The next month, Rainmaker announced it would acquire the remaining 38% of the company. On 30 January 2007, Mainframe rebranded as Rainmaker Animation. Rainmaker Income Fund announced on 29 August 2006, that RNK Capital L.P. would acquire the remaining 38% stake and merge into Rainmaker Income Fund. After the merger, Rainmaker announced on 31 January 2007 that Rainmaker Animation would rebrand as Rainmaker Entertainment. On November 29, 2007, Rainmaker Income Fund announced the sale of Rainmaker Visual Effects and Rainmaker Post to Deluxe Entertainment Services Group (now Deluxe Media), leaving only the animation business which it would fold into weeks later.

== Divisions ==
The company had three divisions: Rainmaker Animation, Rainmaker Visual Effects and Rainmaker Post.

- Rainmaker Animation (now Mainframe Studios); creation of 3D animation for feature films, television films and outsources CGI animation to film and television studios.
- Rainmaker Visual Effects (now Method Studios Vancouver); provision of CGI effects for feature film, television, commercials and video games.
- Rainmaker Post (now Encore Post Vancouver); provision of post-production services including traditional film lab processes, digital image processing and HD.

== Film and television credits ==
Rainmaker created special effects scenes for films such as I, Robot, Armageddon, and The Da Vinci Code, as well as television series such as Stargate SG-1, Stargate Atlantis and Smallville.
