= George Hammond (Stargate) =

Fictional character in Stargate

George S. Hammond
- Don S. Davis in his final appearance as George S. Hammond in the Stargate SG-1 movie, "Stargate Continuum".
- First appearance: "Children of the Gods" (SG-1)
- Last appearance: Stargate: Continuum
- Portrayed by: Don S. Davis; Aaron Pearl (young George Hammond in "1969")

In-universe information
- Species: Human
- Occupation: United States Air Force; Major General; Lieutenant General
- Nationality: American

Lieutenant General George S. Hammond, USAF (Ret.) is a fictional character in the Stargate franchise. Played by American actor Don S. Davis, General Hammond serves as the commander of Stargate Command (SGC) in the first seven seasons of the 1997 television series Stargate SG-1. He is relieved of command in the series' season 7 finale "Lost City", but becomes head of the new Homeworld Security department at the beginning of season 8. Hammond's off-screen retirement is confirmed in SG-1's season 10, and the character's death is mentioned in the series finale of SG-1's spin-off series Stargate Atlantis, "Enemy at the Gate".

Don S. Davis left the regular role after the seventh season of SG-1 due to health problems, but appeared in later seasons as well as in a season 1 episode of Stargate Atlantis. Davis died from a heart attack in June 2008, making his appearance in the 2008 direct-to-DVD film Stargate: Continuum his last. For his portrayal of Hammond, Don S. Davis was nominated for a 2004 Leo Award in the category "Dramatic Series: Best Supporting Performance by a Male" for the season 7 episode "Heroes, Part 2".

== Role in Stargate ==
=== Character arc ===
George S. Hammond is a United States Air Force Major General (later Lieutenant General) from Texas, who commands Stargate Command (SGC) in the first seven seasons of Stargate SG-1. The series pilot introduces Hammond as the successor of Major General West, the commander of the Stargate Project in the original Stargate film. Hammond had been stationed as a Lieutenant at the Cheyenne Mountain Complex (the present-day location of Stargate Command) in 1969, Hammond's mentioned relatives include his wife, who had died of cancer four years before the events of the series began, and his granddaughters named Kayla and Tessa (whose telephone number occupies Hammond's first speed dial button above the President of the United States which occupies the second). His father is also mentioned in the Season 2 episode entitled 1969.

General Hammond has control over each SG mission, but is rarely directly involved with the off-world adventures of SG teams. He is only shown off-world in season 2's "Prisoners", season 3's "Into the Fire" and "Forever in a Day", and the season 7 premiere "Fallen"; he also commands the Earth spaceship Prometheus in season 7's "Lost City" and season 8's "Prometheus Unbound". Hammond's command of the SGC is interrupted once in season 4's "Chain Reaction", where Hammond retires under duress and is temporarily replaced by Major General Bauer. The series never clearly establishes Hammond's second-in-command, although producer Joseph Mallozzi stated in season 7 that "if Hammond were to retire, there's a strong possibility that [Colonel Jack O'Neill] could take over command of the [Stargate Command] base".

In the season 7 finale "Lost City", newly inaugurated President Henry Hayes is pressured into replacing General Hammond with Dr. Elizabeth Weir for a three-month review process of the SGC. Hammond is promoted to the rank of Lieutenant General and is placed in command of the new Homeworld Security department afterwards; Brigadier General Jack O'Neill takes over command of Stargate Command in the season 8 opener "New Order". Hammond appears in the season 1 episode "Home" of Stargate Atlantis (although this was an illusion of Hammond created by telepathic aliens), and appears in seasons 8 through 10 of Stargate SG-1. After Hammond appears in season 9's "The Fourth Horseman" in a civilian suit instead of a military uniform, Lieutenant Colonel Samantha Carter confirms Hammond's retired status in season 10's "The Road Not Taken" when meeting an alternate version of Hammond who remains in charge of the SGC. In his last appearance in the alternate timeline film Stargate: Continuum, General Hammond acts as a military advisor to President Henry Hayes. Carter reports to Lieutenant Colonel John Sheppard in the Stargate Atlantis Season 5 finale/series finale episode, "Enemy at the Gate" that Hammond recently died from a heart attack and that the Daedalus-class ship Phoenix was renamed the George Hammond in his honor.

=== Characterization and relationships ===
According to Approaching The Possible by Jo Storm, the season 2 episode "1969" showed that Hammond climbed the military ladder "by being shrewd, intelligent, and [by being] possessed of a long vision" despite being a "spouted bottom-line pragmatis[t]". Don S. Davis described General Hammond as initially "hard-nosed and straight-ahead", and later as seemingly "stern and straight-laced". Recognizing the need to fulfill the role as a General, Davis still tried to "bring a few levels to him that show some understanding and that make him a little more likeable." The welfare of the men and women under Hammond's command is paramount in the general's mind. Besides knowing that people may not return from his sanctioned missions, General Hammond has to decide when to forgo rescue attempts to not put more lives in danger, even if he "always does so reluctantly and with regret". As shown in "Chain Reaction", Hammond would rather leave the military quietly than risk the careers and lives of his staff and his family, "which must go against all his blustery Texas background".

Davis appreciated Hammond's closeness to the SG-1 team and his willingness to compromise. At the beginning of the series, Hammond does not accept the alien warrior Teal'c but comes to trust and respect him after realizing Teal'c's devotion to the Stargate Program. Despite his admiration for Dr. Daniel Jackson's enthusiasm in the beginning, Hammond has a hard time understanding Daniel's unorthodox and non-military approach to problems until Hammond comes to realize the importance of a civilian viewpoint to SG-1's mission. When the alien Jonas Quinn joins SG-1 in season 6, Davis compared Hammond's response to Jonas to his reaction to Teal'c in season 1. Although Hammond does not blame Jonas for Daniel's death in "Meridian", "the situation does make it difficult for [Hammond] to totally take the young man under his wing and embrace him like family as he has the rest of SG-1". Davis named the NID as Hammond's only source of frustration, since they regularly outflank Hammond and SG-1. Hammond's only option is to call the President for support, but most cases end with SG-1 or Hammond breaking the rules to assure the survival of humanity, so "Hammond will do whatever he must to get things done".

== Conceptual history ==
Don S. Davis was a stand-in and stunt-double for Dana Elcar in MacGyver, a 1985–1992 television series that starred Richard Dean Anderson (who also portrayed Stargate SG-1's lead character Jack O'Neill). At the time, Davis had suffered burnout from teaching acting classes at the University of British Columbia for ten years, and later considered the work on MacGyver "a new lease on life". When the producers cast Stargate SG-1 in 1996, they asked Davis to read for the role of George Hammond and contracted him for multiple years. Davis considered General Hammond in the initial character breakdown as a two-dimensional by-the-book character and a mere foil for O'Neill, and was dissatisfied with the view of the pilot episode's director, Mario Azzopardi, who in particular wanted Hammond to be a military stereotype. Davis, who had served as an army Captain in Korea in the 1960s, felt that the character breakdown did not mirror the reality of military service, and he was reluctant to portray such a role for several years. The producers eventually allowed Davis to humanize the character during the run of the show.

The producers wrote season 4's "Chain Reaction" as "a bit of a Hammond episode" after they had not devoted an episode to Hammond during the first three seasons. The episode ended up "very different" from writer Joseph Mallozzi's original pitch, which he had envisioned as "a Hammond story in which the general faces a court martial after being implicated in the death of an off-world SG team leader". When no more Hammond episodes were written in the following seasons, Davis cited Stargate SG-1's focus on the off-world adventures of the SG team, the military framework and the general's knowledge for why Hammond "can be nothing more than peripheral to that action."

After playing General Hammond for nearly 150 episodes in seven seasons, Don S. Davis decided to leave Stargate SG-1 in late 2003. He had suffered from prolonged health problems and was grateful that the Stargate SG-1 producers had previously continued his employment and had scheduled episodes around his surgeries. Davis turned towards painting and sculpting, but continued to work in the film and television industry including the Stargate franchise, continuing to appear in every season of Stargate SG-1. Davis died from a heart attack at the age of 65 on June 29, 2008, shortly before the release of Stargate: Continuum, his last on-screen appearance as General Hammond. The Stargate producers closed the final Stargate Atlantis episode, "Enemy at the Gate", with a dedication card to Don S. Davis; the episode also mentions the off-screen passing of General Hammond, with Earth's newest ship being named in his honor.

== Reception ==
Jo Storm commended Don S. Davis in her book Approaching The Possible for "bring[ing] out his character's actions and motivations with the confidence and thoughtfulness that only a professional of many years can". In the Stargate SG-1 pilot, Hammond "set[s] up things as advantageously as he can" and proved to be a "competent" and "believable" commander. Talking about Hammond in the season 2 time-travel episode "1969", Storm also credited actor Aaron Pearl, who had done "an amazing job as the younger George Hammond, right down to the slight head tilt and speech lilt". For his portrayal of Hammond, Don S. Davis was nominated for a 2004 Leo Award in the category "Dramatic Series: Best Supporting Performance by a Male" for the season 7 episode "Heroes, Part 2".
