= Don S. Davis =

American actor (1942–2008)

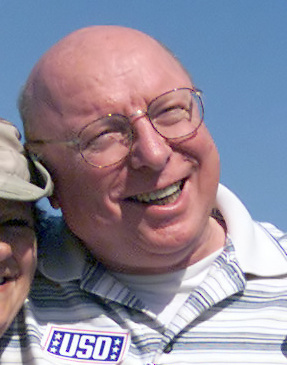
- Davis in 2001
- Born: Donald Sinclair Davis; August 4, 1942; Aurora, Missouri, U.S.
- Died: June 29, 2008 (aged 65); Gibsons, British Columbia, Canada
- Occupations: Actor; stuntman; stunt coordinator; choreographer; painter; sculptor; soldier; professor
- Years active: 1981–2008
- Spouse: Ruby Fleming (m. 2003)
- Children: 1
- Military career
- Allegiance: United States
- Branch: United States Army
- Service years: 1960s
- Rank: Captain

Donald Sinclair Davis (August 4, 1942 – June 29, 2008) was an American actor best known for playing General George Hammond in the television series Stargate SG-1 (1997–2007), and earlier for playing Major Garland Briggs on the television series Twin Peaks (1990–1991) and Captain William Scully in The X-Files. In animation, he was also known as Wild Bill in the 2003 direct-to-video animated movie G.I. Joe: Spy Troops and its 2004 sequel, G.I. Joe: Valor vs. Venom. He was also a theater professor, painter, and United States Army captain.

== Early life and education ==
Davis was born and raised in Aurora, Missouri. He earned a Bachelor of Science degree in theater and art from Southwest Missouri State College. He said that "during the Vietnam era" he "was with the 7th Infantry in Korea" and at another point was "a personnel and administration officer; I ran records branches." He was a captain at Fort Leonard Wood by the time he left the U.S. Army, "and worked with General Officers, so I've been able to use that in Hammond and other characters."

In 1970 he received a master's degree in theater from the Southern Illinois University Carbondale (SIU); his thesis was "Design and Construction of Stage Settings for Black Comedy and The Two Executioners". He taught for several years before returning to SIUC to complete a Ph.D. degree in theatre; his dissertation was "The Evolution of Scenography in the Western Theater".

He began working in the film industry in the 1980s, while teaching at the University of British Columbia. In 1987, he stopped teaching in order to pursue acting full-time.

== Career ==
Davis stated that he landed the role of the eloquently spoken Major Briggs when "I was living in Vancouver and doing local work. But because of my accent in the '80s I couldn't play a Canadian in commercials. So someone suggested that I get an agent in Seattle. I did and was able to get commercial work and acting jobs there. I had a good résumé. So when they were casting the Twin Peaks pilot my agent sent me out to the audition. I met series creator David Lynch and didn't actually read for him—we just visited. ... David liked me and started writing for me. He liked the chemistry I had with other players. I did three days on the pilot and then went on to the series. That was the luckiest break I could have had. There are at least a dozen people from that show who are lifelong friends because of that show. It was a life-changing experience."

In the TV show MacGyver, Davis was the stunt/photography double for Dana Elcar and appeared in two episodes of MacGyver as a different character each time. He also played Dana Scully's father in the series The X-Files. Davis also acted in a short film produced by Historica Canada as an arrogant American gold prospector who assaults Mountie Sam Steele and played the role of the Racine Belles' manager in the movie A League of Their Own. He also had a guest-starring role in the pilot episode of the comedy-drama television series Psych, playing the character of Mr. McCallum.

Davis was a member of the main cast of Stargate SG-1 during the first seven seasons of that television series, portraying General Hammond, commander of Stargate Command (SGC). He appeared in a recurring role during Seasons 8 to 10, cutting back his commitment due to health problems. He also played the character in one episode of the Stargate spin-off series Stargate Atlantis.

== Later life and death ==
Davis died of a heart attack on June 29, 2008, at the age of 65. He had been suffering from heart disease and diabetes. At the time of his death, Davis was living in Gibsons, British Columbia, Canada. He was cremated and his ashes were scattered into the Pacific Ocean.

The writers of Stargate Atlantis paid him homage by mentioning the death of his character George Hammond and naming a spaceship after him in the final episode of the show airing January 9, 2009. He was again honored in October 2009, with the appearance of the spaceship Hammond in the pilot episode of Stargate Universe. Coincidentally, in episode 16 of season 4 of SG-1, "2010" (an episode set in the future which originally aired in January 2001), it is stated that General Hammond had died of a heart attack prior to the episode's events. His character on The X-Files, William Scully, had also died of a heart attack fourteen years earlier.

Davis did not live to see the release of one of his final performances, Stargate: Continuum, released on July 29, 2008, one month after his death.

== Personal life ==
Davis married Ruby Fleming in 2003, by which time he had a son, Matt Davis, from a previous marriage.

Davis was also a visual artist, spending most of his free time painting or carving. He grew up painting, sculpting, and drawing, and continued to pursue these crafts his entire life, supplementing his income with design commissions and art sales. On the DVD commentary track for Stargate SG-1 season 6 episode 17 ("Disclosure"), Davis said that he once had a job carving wooden cigar store Indians that were sold at Silver Dollar City.

== Selected filmography ==
- The Journey of Natty Gann (1985) — Railroad Brakeman
- Malone (1987) — Buddy
- Stakeout (1987) — Prison Gate Guard
- Watchers (1988) — Veterinarian
- Beyond the Stars (1989) — Phil Clawson
- Look Who's Talking (1989) — Dr. Fleischer
- Cadence (1990) — Haig (uncredited)
- Look Who's Talking Too (1990) — Dr. Fleischer
- Omen IV: The Awakening (1991, TV movie) — Jake Madison
- Chaindance (1991) — Sergeant
- Mystery Date (1991) — Doheny
- The Gambler Returns: The Luck of the Draw (1991, TV movie) — Rodeo announcer
- Hook (1991) — Dr. Fields
- Kuffs (1992) — Police gun instructor
- Twin Peaks: Fire Walk with Me (1992) — Maj. Garland Briggs (scenes deleted)
- A League of Their Own (1992) — Charlie Collins (Racine coach)
- Cliffhanger (1993) — Stuart
- Needful Things (1993) — Reverend Willie Rose
- Max (1994) — Earl Pomerance
- Hideaway (1995) — Dr. Martin
- The Fan (1996) — Stook
- Alaska (1996) — Sergeant Grazer
- The Prisoner of Zenda, Inc. (1996, TV movie) — Colonel Zapf
- Volcano: Fire on the Mountain (1997, TV movie) — Mayor Bob Hart
- Dad's Week Off (1997, TV movie) — Hank
- Con Air (1997) — Man driving Volvo
- Suspicious River (2000) — Golf shirt man
- Best in Show (2000) — Mayflower Best in Show Judge Everett Bainbridge
- The 6th Day (2000) — Cardinal de la Jolla
- Deadly Little Secrets (2002) — The Chief
- G.I. Joe: Spy Troops — The movie (2003, TV movie) — Wild Bill (voice)
- Miracle (2004) — Bob Fleming
- Stargate: SG3000 (2004, Short) — Computer Representation of George Hammond (voice)
- Savage Island (2004) — Keith Young
- Meltdown (2004, TV movie) — NRC Carl Mansfield
- G.I. Joe: Valor vs. Venom (2004) — Wild Bill (voice)
- The Still Life (2006) — Mr. Fernot
- Seed (2006) — Davis
- Beneath (2007) — Joseph
- Beyond Loch Ness (2008, TV movie) — Neil Chapman
- Stargate: Continuum (2008) — Lt. Gen. George Hammond
- Vipers (2008, TV movie) — Dr. Silverton
- Far Cry (2008) — General Roderick
- The Uninvited (2009) — Mr. Henson
- Wyvern (2008, TV movie) — Colonel Travis Sherman (dedicated to Davis)
- Stargate SG-1: Children of the Gods - Final Cut (2009) — Maj. Gen. George Hammond (dedicated to Davis)
- Woodshop (2009) — Principal Jamison
- Twin Peaks: The Missing Pieces (2014) — Major Garland Briggs

== Partial television credits ==
- MacGyver (1985–1991) — stunt double for Dana Elcar
- 21 Jump Street (1987) — Principal Harris, and (1988) — Frank
- Booker (1989) — Sheriff
- L.A. Law (1990) — Judge Richard Bartke
- Twin Peaks (1990–1991) — Major Garland Briggs
- Columbo: A Bird in the Hand (1992) — Bertie
- Highlander: The Series (1993) — Palance
- Heritage Minutes (1993) — Norris
- The X-Files (1994) — Captain William Scully (2 episodes)
- Northern Exposure (1994) — Lloyd Hillegas, season 5, episode 23
- Madison (1994—1996) — Mr. Winslow (7 episodes)
- Black Fox (1995 miniseries) — Sergeant
- The Outer Limits (1995) — General Callahan, Detective Wilson
- Profit (1996) – Former Sheriff Crew (2 episodes)
- Poltergeist: The Legacy (1996) — Harold Taggart
- In Cold Blood (1996 miniseries)
- Viper (1996) — Lloyd
- Stargate SG-1 (1997–2007) — Major General/Lieutenant General George Hammond
- Atomic Train (1999 miniseries) — General Harlan Ford
- The Chris Isaak Show (2002) — Del
- Just Cause (2002) — Thornton
- The Twilight Zone (2003) — Dr. Tate
- Stargate Atlantis (2004) — Major General George Hammond
- Andromeda (2004) — Avineri
- NCIS (2004) — MTAC Control Officer
- The West Wing (2005) — Reverend Don Butler
- The Dead Zone (2005) — Senator Harlan Ellis (3 episodes)
- Psych (2006) — Mr. McCallum
- Supernatural (2007) — Trotter
- Flash Gordon (2007) — Mr. Mitchell
- Burn Up (2008 miniseries) — The Man
- Twin Peaks: The Return (2017) — Major Garland Briggs (archival footage)
