= Jack O'Neill =

Fictional character from the Stargate universe

- Richard Dean Anderson as Jack O'Neill in a promotional photo for Stargate SG-1
- First appearance: Stargate
- Last appearance: "Incursion" (Universe)
- Created by: Roland Emmerich and Dean Devlin
- Portrayed by: Kurt Russell (1994); Richard Dean Anderson (1997–2010)

In-universe information
- Species: Human
- Occupation: United States Air Force; Colonel; Brigadier General; Major General; Lieutenant General
- Spouse: Sara O'Neill (wife in film)/(ex-wife in television series)
- Children: Tyler O'Neil (son, in film); Charlie O'Neill (son, deceased, in television series)
- Accolades: Defense Distinguished Service Medal; Air Force Distinguished Service Medal; Defense Superior Service Medal; Airman's Medal; Defense Meritorious Service Medal; Meritorious Service Medal; Air Medal; Aerial Achievement Medal; Joint Service Commendation Medal; Air Force Commendation Medal; Air Force Achievement Medal

Jonathan J. "Jack" O'Neill (O'Neil in the 1994 film) is a fictional character in the Metro-Goldwyn-Mayer military science fiction franchise Stargate, primarily as one of the main characters of the television series Stargate SG-1. Richard Dean Anderson played O'Neill in all the Stargate media from 1997, when he took over the role from actor Kurt Russell, who portrayed the character in the original Stargate film in 1994. O'Neill and Daniel Jackson are the only two characters to appear in both the original film and all three live-action Stargate television series.

In his first appearance in the 1994 film as Colonel Jack O'Neil, the character leads the first team to go through the Stargate on a reconnaissance mission. He subsequently becomes the main character of the television series Stargate SG-1 created in 1997 as a sequel to the movie. In the first seven seasons of the show, Colonel Jack O'Neill, recalled from retirement after the first film, is the leader of the team SG-1, a part of the Stargate Program, whose goal is to explore the galaxy and defend against alien threats.

He became less prominent in the eighth season, in which he is promoted to Commanding Officer of Stargate Command, at the rank of brigadier general, therefore greatly reducing the character's time spent exploring via the Stargate. Anderson chose to spend more time with his family, eventually leaving the show at the start of its ninth season and only appearing four times until the end of the series in its tenth and final season. The character's absence from the show was explained by yet another promotion, to the position of head of the Department of Homeworld Security, as a major general.

Anderson reprised his role once again in the direct-to-DVD film Stargate: Continuum, a sequel to the TV series. O'Neill also appeared in the two other Stargate television series: he was an occasional character in the first three seasons of Stargate Atlantis, serving as an Earth contact with Atlantis, this running parallel with Stargate SG-1 for a time, and in four episodes of Stargate Universe, as a lieutenant general, having been promoted sometime after both SG-1 and Atlantis had ended. His appearance in this show's first season finale is his last appearance in the Stargate universe to date. Anderson also voiced the character in the video game Stargate SG-1: Unleashed.

== Character arc ==
Jack O'Neill is a United States Air Force colonel with experience in special operations before joining the Stargate Program. He was married to Sara O'Neill, but their marriage suffered when Jack sank into a deep depression after their son accidentally shot himself with O'Neill's pistol. He then joins a dangerous mission through the Stargate with a couple of airmen and Dr. Daniel Jackson, who deciphers how to use the Stargate. They are transported to another planet. O'Neill's standing order is to detonate a nuclear warhead near the Stargate at any sign of danger. But a young boy named Skaara gives him a renewed sense of life. After the defeat of Ra, O'Neill and his team return to Earth, while Jackson remains on the planet. Though he and Sara were still together when Jack was initially recruited for his first mission through the Stargate, by the time he returned she had left him.

O'Neill returns to the Stargate Program when the Goa'uld Apophis attacks the Earth installation via its stargate. He is given command of the SG-1 team, which consists of himself, Samantha Carter, Teal'c and Jackson. Eventually O'Neill gets the Repository of the Ancients temporarily "downloaded" to his brain and becomes the first modern human to travel to another galaxy, the Asgard home galaxy. A second download of the Ancients' knowledge into his brain during the season 7 finale, allows him to lead SG-1 to an Ancient outpost in Antarctica. O'Neill possesses the ATA gene, and thus is able to operate the Ancient weapons chair and save Earth from Anubis's fleet. With the Ancient knowledge about to overwhelm his personality and kill him, he is placed into a stasis pod in the outpost until Thor of the Asgard is able to remove the knowledge and save his life. After that event, O'Neill is promoted to brigadier general and is given command of Stargate Command. O'Neill is promoted again off-screen and becomes the new head of the Office of Homeworld Security/Homeworld Command after the retirement of General Hammond, with Major General Hank Landry taking his position as the new commander of Stargate Command.

In the pilot of Stargate Atlantis, O'Neill convinces John Sheppard to join the Atlantis expedition to the Pegasus Galaxy. In 2006, he, along with Richard Woolsey, visits Atlantis to create a treaty between the humans of Earth and the Ancients. The death of O'Neill is briefly shown in an alternate timeline where Ba'al controls the Goa'uld Empire. O'Neill reappears as a lieutenant general in Stargate Universe with Nicholas Rush, where he is recruiting Eli Wallace into the Icarus Project. After the attack on the Icarus Base, he contacts Carter from The Pentagon to talk about the ongoing situation. With help from the Ancient Communication Stones, Everett Young body swaps with Colonel David Telford to tell O'Neill about a dire situation in which they find themselves.

== Conceptual history ==
=== Conception ===
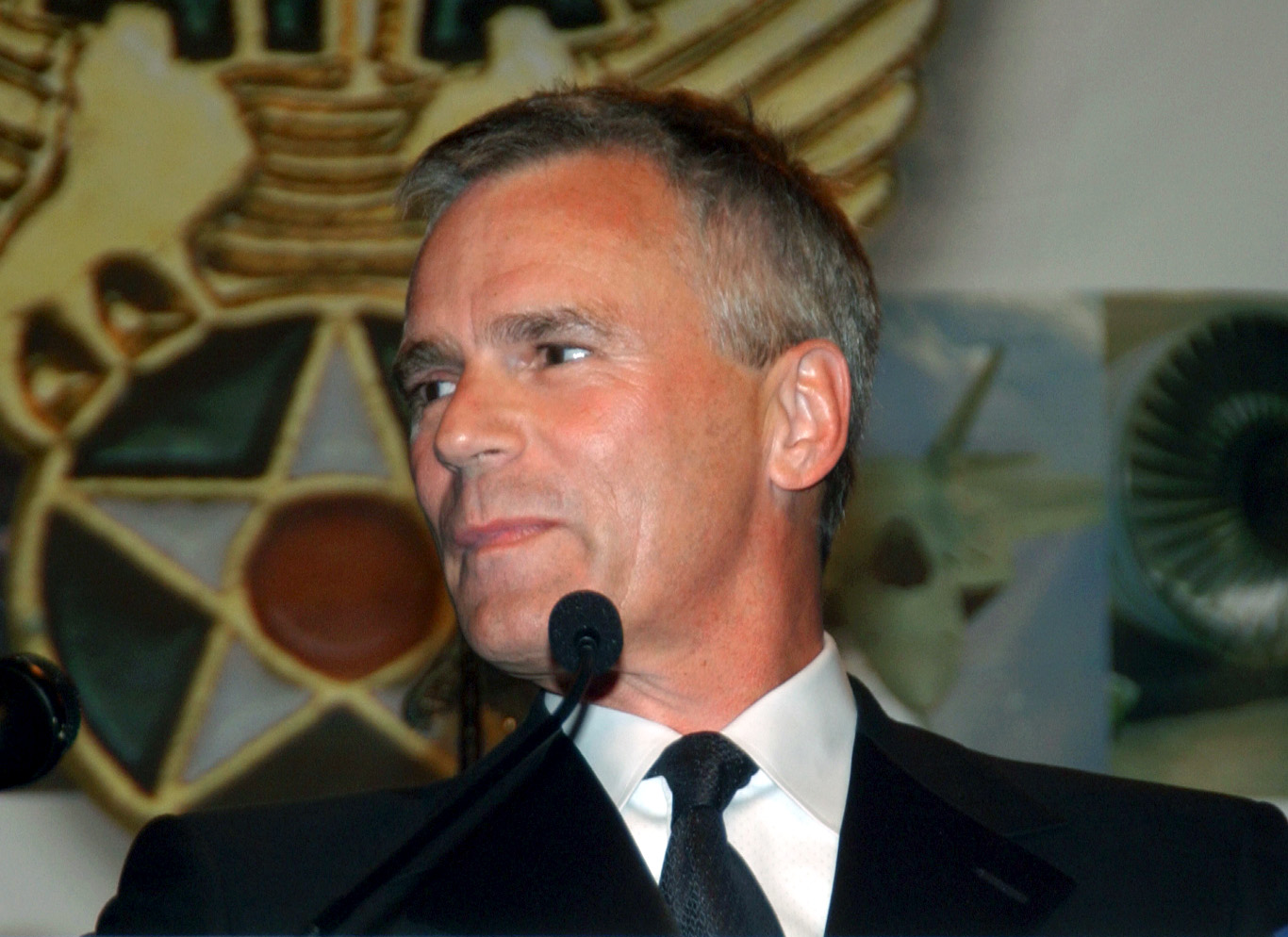
Anderson at the 2004 Air Force Association dinner where he was recognized for the show's continuous positive depiction of the United States Air Force.

John Symes approached Michael Greenburg and Richard Dean Anderson of MacGyver fame. Although Anderson was never a real fan of the science fiction genre, he believed the original feature film to be a good vehicle for a series. Anderson agreed to become involved with the project if his character was allowed significantly more comedic leeway than Kurt Russell's character in the feature film, shown especially Anderson's flippant and utter disregard for appropriate military protocol and decorum over the series, which contrasted Russell's "by the book" adherence to protocol. He also requested Stargate SG-1 to be more of an ensemble show, so that he would not be carrying the plot alone as on MacGyver. Anderson was part of the main cast from season 1 through 8 and played a recurring role in several episodes each season thereafter. He was influential in the development of O'Neill's character and personality from the beginning. While he praised the work done by Russell in the Stargate film, he said he couldn't be that serious all the time and worked with the writers and directors to give his O'Neill a more lighthearted tone while maintaining the sense of importance the role required. Additionally, he joked that he would never be able to get his hair to stay like Russell's. This "double personality" was also joked in the second season, when Jack introduced himself as: "It's 'O'Neill,' with two 'L's. There's another Colonel O'Neil with only one L, and he has no sense of humor at all." Fans have speculated that the transition is due to Russell's O'Neill still being deeply traumatised by the recent death of his son, while Anderson's has overcome the worst of his issues even if he makes it clear he will never forget his loss.

=== Development ===
In season 8, Anderson chose to have a reduced role in the series so that he could spend more time with his young daughter. When Anderson left the show as a main character in the eighth season, the producers were talking about ending the series. Instead, the series introduced two new characters in the ninth season, Ben Browder as Cameron Mitchell, the new SG-1 team leader, and Beau Bridges as Hank Landry, the new commanding officer of Stargate Command. Anderson continued to appear in a recurring status on Stargate SG-1, albeit with less frequent appearances. He returned for the second straight-to-DVD film, Stargate: Continuum in a brief cameo, and was expected to return for the third movie. Executive producer Brad Wright stressed the importance of O'Neill's presence in the Stargate universe even after the character went on hiatus during the last two seasons of SG-1 when Anderson took a leave from regular acting.

Anderson has also had various guest appearances on the two spin off series' Stargate Atlantis and Stargate Universe. Anderson had several guest cameos scattered over the first season of Stargate Universe. He is mainly seen in the Pentagon but later visits the Destiny after the revelations about Telford emerge. In total, he appears in six episodes of Stargate Universe, the most of any main actor from Stargate SG-1.

== Reception ==
For his portrayal of O'Neill, Richard Dean Anderson won a Saturn Award in the category "Best Genre TV Actor" in 1999, and was nominated in the same category in 1998 and 2000. From 2001 to 2005, Anderson was nominated for a Saturn Award in the category "Best Actor on Television" but never won. Anderson was nominated in the category for "Best Male Performance in a 2008 Science Fiction Film, TV Movie, or Mini-Series" at the Constellation Awards in 2009 for his work in Stargate: Continuum (2008), where he reprised his role as O'Neill.

He was presented with an award at the Air Force Association's 57th Annual Air Force Anniversary Dinner in Washington, D.C., on September 14, 2004, because of his role as star and executive producer of Stargate SG-1, a series which has portrayed the Air Force in a positive light since it first premiered. It was presented by the then-Air Force Chief-of-Staff, General John P. Jumper. Anderson was made an honorary brigadier general.

TV Guide ranked Jack O'Neill #10 on its "25 Greatest Sci-Fi Legends of All Time" list.
