= Chimera (Stargate SG-1) =

- Stargate SG-1 episode
- Episode no.: Season 7 Episode 15
- Directed by: Will Waring
- Written by: Robert C. Cooper
- Teleplay by: Damian Kindler
- Cinematography by: Peter F. Woeste
- Editing by: Eric Hill
- Production code: P263
- Original air date: 20 January 2004

Guest appearances
- Anna-Louise Plowman as Osiris; David DeLuise as Pete Shanahan; Paul Jarrett as Special Agent Farrity

Episode chronology
← Previous "Fallout"	Next → "Death Knell"
- Stargate SG-1 (season 7)

"Chimera" is the 15th episode from the seventh season of military science fiction adventure television show Stargate SG-1 and is the 147th overall. It was first broadcast on January 20, 2004, on Sky One in the United Kingdom. The episode was written by the shows executive producer Robert C. Cooper, with Damian Kindler writing the teleplay and Will Waring directing.

In the episode, Dr. Daniel Jackson (Michael Shanks) has been having strange dreams, recalling memories of his time spent with Dr. Sarah Gardener (Anna-Louise Plowman), before she became host to the Goa'uld Osiris that don't quite line up with what actually happened. Meanwhile, Major Samantha Carter (Amanda Tapping) starts seeing a police detective, Pete Shanahan (David DeLuise), who becomes curious about the top secret Air Force project Carter works for.

The episodes writers Damian Kindler and Robert C. Cooper, along with actor Amanda Tapping have all described "Chimera" as a "departure" episode for its greater emphasis on the romance and character development of Samantha Carter & Pete, and Daniel & Sarah. Although the episode was well received, "Chimera" introduced Pete Shanahan, notoriously referred to by fans, and later by critics and even those involved in the shows production as "Stalker Pete".

== Plot ==
The Goa'uld Osiris has snuck into Daniel Jackson's (Michael Shanks) home and is using a device to enter his mind as he sleeps. The next morning in a coffee shop, Samantha Carter (Amanda Tapping) meets her new boyfriend Pete Shanahan (David DeLuise) who tries to persuade her to spend the day with him instead of going to work. Declining Pete's request, she arrives at Stargate Command and is greeted by a tired Daniel who tells her about a strange dream he had about his ex-girlfriend Sarah, who is now host to Osiris. Daniel explains that in his dreams he's reliving events from his and Sarah's time together in Chicago, however he feels as though things aren't quite right. Carter then tells Jack O'Neill (Richard Dean Anderson) about her new relationship with Pete, revealing to him that her brother set them up together.

Using an Asgard transporter Osiris continues to visit Daniel at night as he sleeps, and one night shows Daniel a stone tablet covered with strange symbols, which she asks for Daniel's help in deciphering. The next morning at Stargate Command, an extremely tired Daniel tells Sam and Teal'c (Christopher Judge) about his dreams and the tablet. He tells them that the tablets bears resemblance to the one they found on Abydos and Teal'c & Sam suggest he's that he's subconsciously attempting to reveal the location of the Lost City.

Pete takes Sam to a ballroom dance, and afterwards they spend the night together at Sam's house. The next morning, after confiding in Sam about his previous marriage and divorce, Pete leaves frustrated after Sam's seeming unwillingness to reveal any details about her life and the work she does. Pete contacts a friend in the FBI, who warns him that Carter must be involved in something big & top secret. Osiris once again has returned and linked her mind with Daniel as he sleeps. In Daniel's dream, he is becoming increasingly frustrated at being unable to understand one of the passages of text on the tablet. Much to Daniel's disbelief Sarah is able to correctly translates it. A confused Daniel then realises he and Sarah had planned to go out for dinner to celebrate two months since they first started seeing each other, but Sarah claims not to mind. Daniel however recognises that when he really missed their date, Sarah left him.

The next day Daniel describes his dreams to Teal'c, Sam and General Hammond (Don S. Davis), when Teal'c suddenly realises that the Goa'uld possess the technology to explore people minds and that Osiris could in fact be on Earth probing Daniel when he sleeps. That night, SG-1 put Daniel's house under surveillance and plan to block Osiris' escape by jamming her from transporting away. Osiris arrives and reconnects Daniel and themselves to the constructed reality, but once in there Daniel admits the text means nothing to him, causing Osiris to sever the connection and begin attacking Daniel in the real world. O'Neill and Teal'c move in as Osiris attempts to transport out.

Unable to do so, they instead turn their attention to O'Neill, throwing him back with their hand-device before shooting at Teal'c. Pete, who has followed Sam to the stakeout confronts her as Osiris comes out the front door and begins firing at the pair who both return fire. O'Neill shoots Osiris with a tranquilliser, but not before Pete is hit by weapons fire.

At the SGC, Sarah wakes up, after finally being freed from Osiris, and cries on Daniel's shoulder. In another room, Pete is visited by Sam, who finally tells him the truth about her work and the Stargate.

== Production ==
=== Development and writing ===
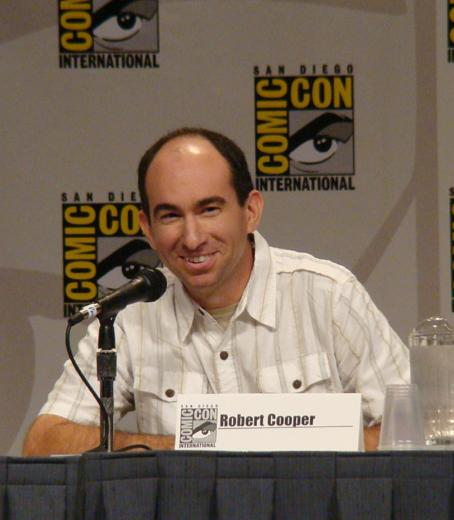
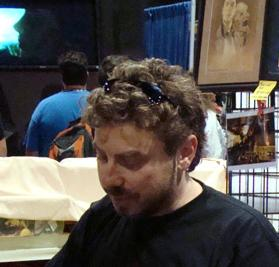
Executive producer Robert C. Cooper came up with the outline of the story, developing it further with Damian Kindler who went on to write the teleplay.

Executive producer Robert C. Cooper wanted to use season seven of Stargate SG-1 as an opportunity to "really showcase a little more of the personal sides" of the characters Major Samantha Carter, Dr. Daniel Jackson and Teal'c. This was influenced by the reduced availability of Richard Dean Anderson who portrays Colonel Jack O'Neill in the series, with Cooper explaining "he's going to be present in almost every episode. But there's going to be a lot more focus put on the other three characters and their relationships".

Actress Amanda Tapping felt that despite her character of Samantha Carter's "obvious attraction" to Anderson's O'Neill, it was very important that "Carter not sit there pining away for her commanding officer", with the actress believing that it "weakens her considerably" and that she was "starting to get sick" of it as a plot point. Tapping also believed that Carter's dating history had become "a joke on the Internet, the 'Black Widow Curse'" and so she encouraged the writers to move away from these elements. Cooper as show-runner, and Brad Wright before him had frequently commented upon the will-they-won't-they dynamic between Carter and O'Neill, citing that the United States Air Force involvement in the show made it an impossibility to explicitly link the two characters romantically due to O'Neill being Carter's superior officer. Both fans of the show and those involved in making the series joked that Carter had a "Black Widow Curse", whereby everyone she was linked to romantically ended up dying, which included Martouf ("Divide and Conquer"), Narim ("Between Two Fires") & Jonas Hanson ("The First Commandment"). Conversations between Tapping and Cooper lead them to evaluate where the character would then go, with Cooper explaining that Carter "tends to be, in our scripts, the person who does all of the techno-babble exposition, and we sometimes lose track of the fact that she's also a woman, who has a life, and we wanted to explore that too". As writing commenced on the new season in late 2002, Cooper pitched the idea of Carter entering a relationship and having the love interest live out the episode. The pitch idea was subsequently referred to as "Black Widow Carter".

With the return of actor Michael Shanks in season seven, a number of stories that were shelved from season six due to the character of Daniel Jackson's absence were now able to be told, one of which was Cooper's desire to reunite Jackson with the Goa'uld Osiris. Co-producers Paul Mullie and Joseph Mallozzi then married the Daniel/Osiris story with "Black Widow Carter", and Cooper assigned writer and producer Damian Kindler to pen the episode, fleshing the story out together first. Upon joining the writing staff in season six, Kindler felt that Carter was "woefully under-explored". He believed the characters "abilities are without doubt. She’s a genius, she’s brave, she’s worthy, she’s heroic", but he wanted to add more layers to Carter "that would flesh her out to me as a person". Kindler described himself as becoming "fascinated as to what else was going on" with the character, calling it a "mini-agenda" that he tell "some good Carter stories", and would go on to write the episodes "Space Race" and "Grace" to focus on the character in season seven. In the episode "Grace", Kindler described having Carter "address some very heavy issues in her life in order to find a reason to keep going", one of which being Jack O'Neill, with Kindler using the story to show Carter's feeling for O'Neill and "what that has been doing to her for seven years". Kindler and Cooper wanted the repercussions of "Grace" to play out in "Black Widow Carter", having Carter move on from O'Neill and get a boyfriend.

For the Daniel and Osiris storyline, Kindler rewatched the Sarah Gardener, host of the Goa'uld Osiris, introductory episode "The Curse" from the shows fourth season as he wanted his episode to be a sequel that concluded their storyline. Plot points including Osiris' alliance with the Goa'uld Anubis and the information and technology gained from Anubis' torture of Thor in the season five episode "Revelations" were incorporated, as was the continuing search for The Lost City. Kindler engineered the Daniel and Osiris story to run concurrently with the Sam romance story. Kindler also considered the journey of Teal'c as a character and the events of "The Changeling" when looking at how the character would contribute. Kindler recognised that since losing his Goa'uld symbiote, Teal'c would now sleep and dream, something the character did not previously do and therefore would be able to help Daniel Jackson with his dreams, recognising the Goa'uld manipulation. The title "Chimera" was selected by Kindler because of Carter's romantic history, with the writer likening her to a monster or Chimera as well as its alternative meaning that he described as a "fleeting dream that doesn't last". Kindler wrote the script during the shows summer hiatus, completing his final draft on July 15, 2003, before submitting the finished script on July 24, 2003. Cooper noted that there ended up being "three Carter-heavy shows almost in a row" with "Grace", "Chimera" and then "Death Knell".

=== Cast ===
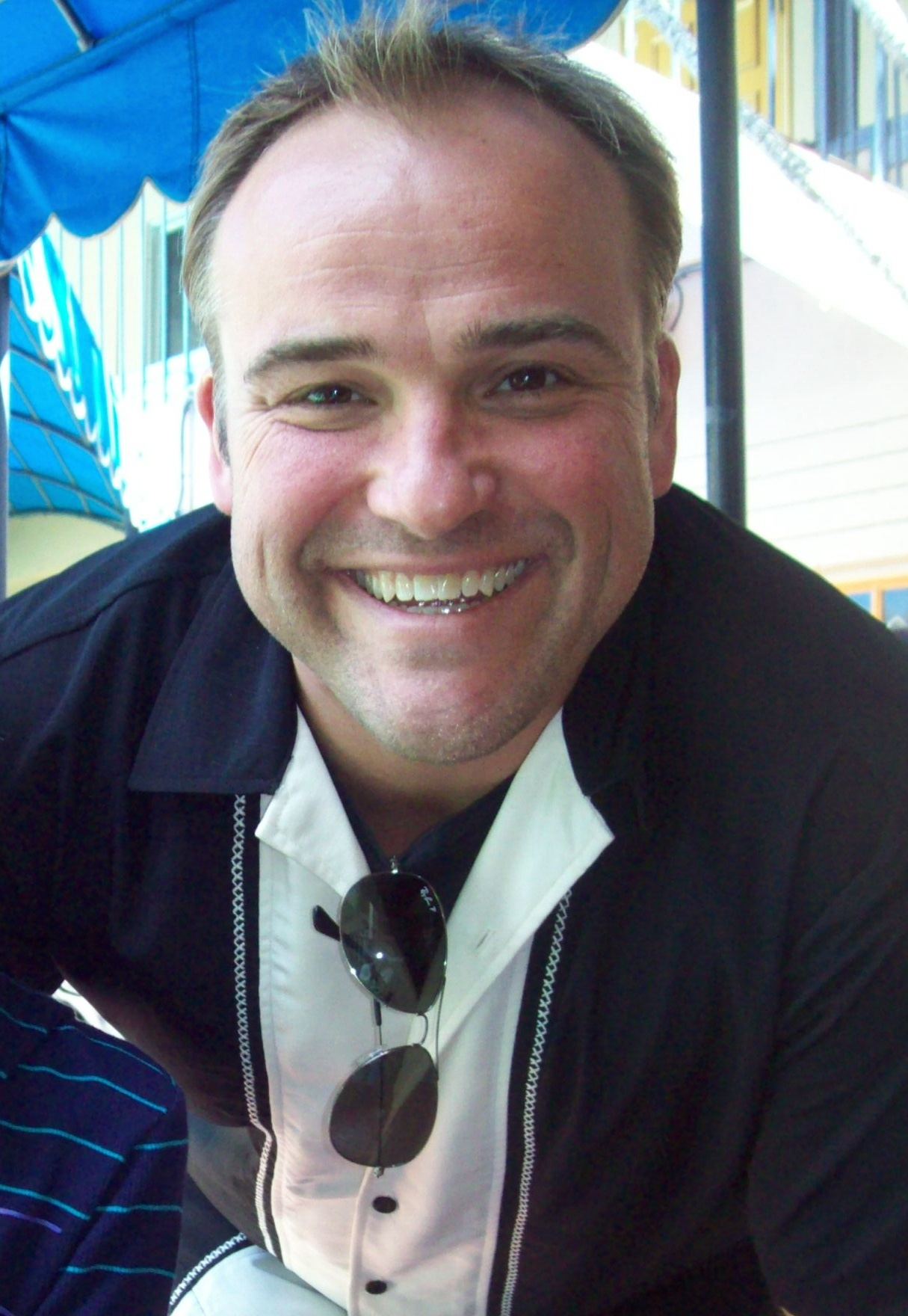
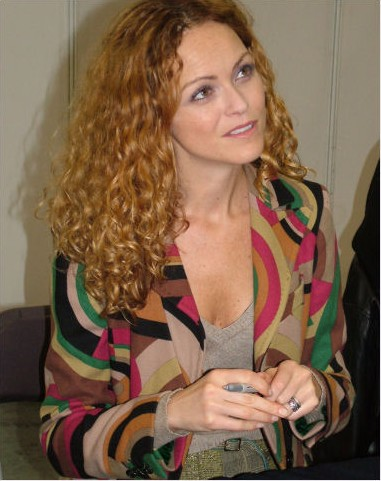
David DeLuise (left) became the fourth member of the DeLuise family to appear on the show, guest starring as Carter's love interest Pete Shanahan. Anna-Louise Plowman (right) reprises her role of Osiris/Sarah Gardener, making her final appearance in the series.

An offer was made to Ben Browder to play the role of Carter's love interest, however the actor turned the part down. Browder was later considered for the roles of Major John Sheppard as well as Colonel Dillon Everett in Stargate Atlantis, before eventually being cast as Colonel Cameron Mitchell, becoming one of the shows main characters from season nine onwards. Executive producer Michael Greenburg instead suggested David DeLuise, younger brother of SG-1 director, writer and producer Peter DeLuise. Peter phoned David to gauge his interest and availability in playing the part and a day later David was given an offer and put on a plane that evening, with filming taking place the very next day. The original name for the character failed to clear the shows lawyers as there was a person living in Denver with the same name, with the character instead being named Pete Shanahan. David DeLuise's casting in the show made him the fourth member of the DeLuise family to appear, with Dom DeLuise guest starring as Urgo in the episode of the same name and Michael DeLuise guest starring as Nick Marlowe in "Wormhole Extreme" and later "200". Prior to filming, Kindler and Peter sat down with David and helped him define the character, with Peter believing it was important that Pete be portrayed "a little more grown up" as Peter wanted it to be "believable that Sam’s character was attracted or involved" with someone like David DeLuise's Pete.

Anna-Louise Plowman returns as Dr. Sarah Gardener, host to the Goa'uld Osiris. The episode had originally been planned for later in the season, however Plowman's availability which was coupled with having to fly the actress in from the United Kingdom where she resided, meant bringing it forward to accommodate the actress. Prior to "Chimera" Plowman had last appeared in the season five episode "Revelations", and although open to returning as Gardener the episode marks her final appearance in the franchise.

=== Filming ===
"Chimera" is the third episode directed by series camera operator Will Waring. Peter F. Woeste served as cinematographer, although as filming was split over a long period with multiple episodes being worked on simultaneously, therefore Andrew Wilson stepped in as director of photography for some scenes whilst Woeste directed "Inauguration". Parts of the episode "Grace" were also filmed by the shows second unit whilst the shows main unit worked on "Chimera".

More urban location filming was used than a typical episode of the show, with location manager Lynn Smith commenting that they were "all over the place". One of the first locations visited was the recurring home of Samantha Carter, a private residence on Grand Boulevard in North Vancouver. Smith noted that they had to "make sure that the neighbours had had enough of a break between projects" as the location had become popular with other productions. Boulevard Park opposite the house was also used. The FBI office of Special Agent Farrity (Paul Jarrett) was also shot at the residence on Grand Boulevard. Shots Amanda Tapping's Sam Carter in the doorway of her house and the subsequent reactions of David DeLuise's Pete in the scene where Pete arrives to take Sam to the dance were shot two weeks apart. DeLuise's reaction shots were also filmed at an entirely different location, with DeLuise instead reacting to Anne Marie Loder due to Tapping not being available. Production then moved to a private residence on Edinburgh Street in North Burnaby for two days, with the location being used as the home of Dr. Daniel Jackson. The road outside the residence was also shut down to film the shootout between SG-1, Pete and Osiris, followed by blowing up a van. The surveillance van interior was built in the Stargate embarkation room at The Bridge Studios. Elsewhere on the standing sets at Bridge Studios, the multipurpose room was dressed as a canteen for a number of scenes, before being redressed as a gym. Amanda Tapping had originally intended for her character Samantha Carter to hum the theme tune of Richard Dean Anderson's former series MacGyver whilst sharing a lift with Anderson's Jack O'Neill. Tapping couldn't remember MacGyver in time, so instead opted to brake the fourth wall by humming the Stargate SG-1 theme.

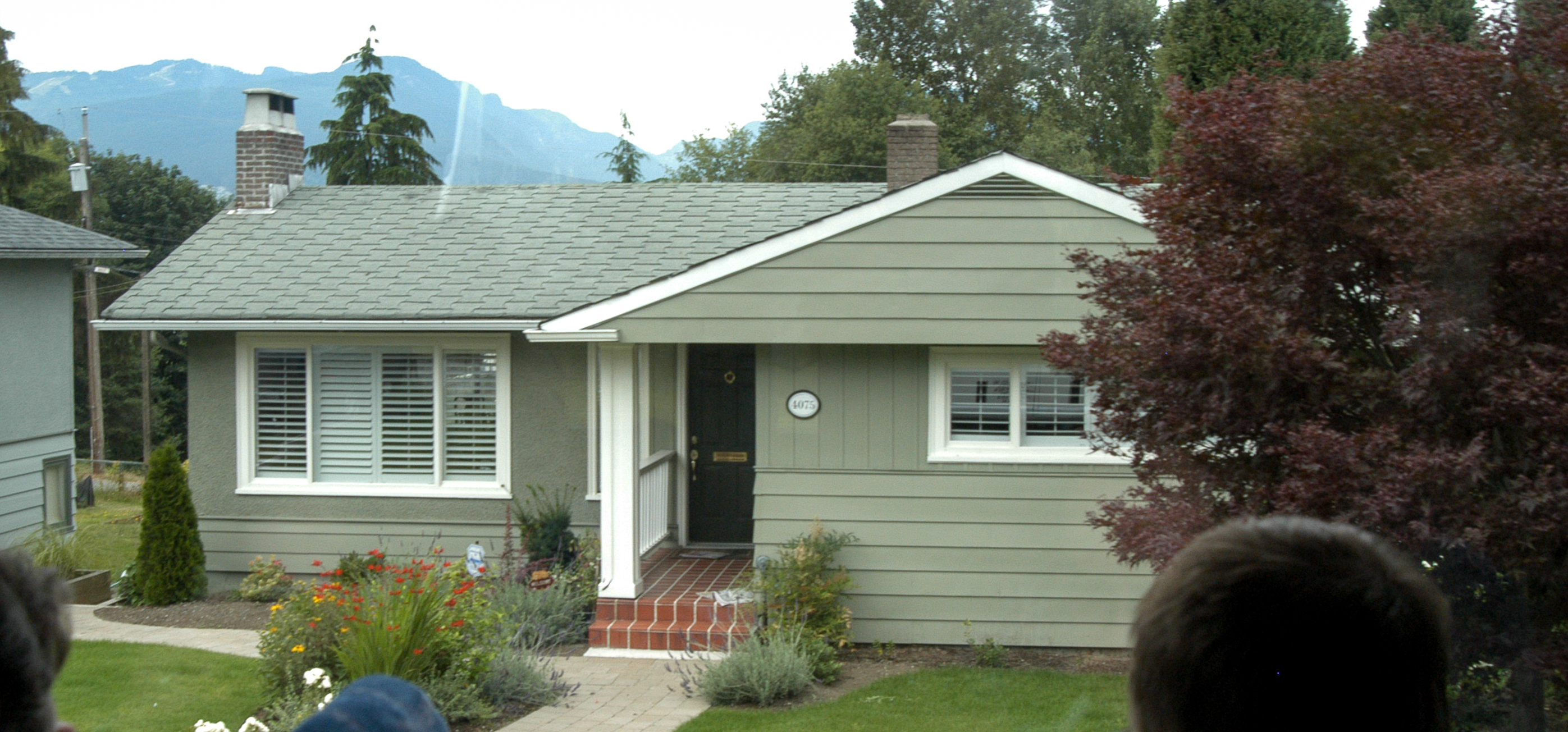
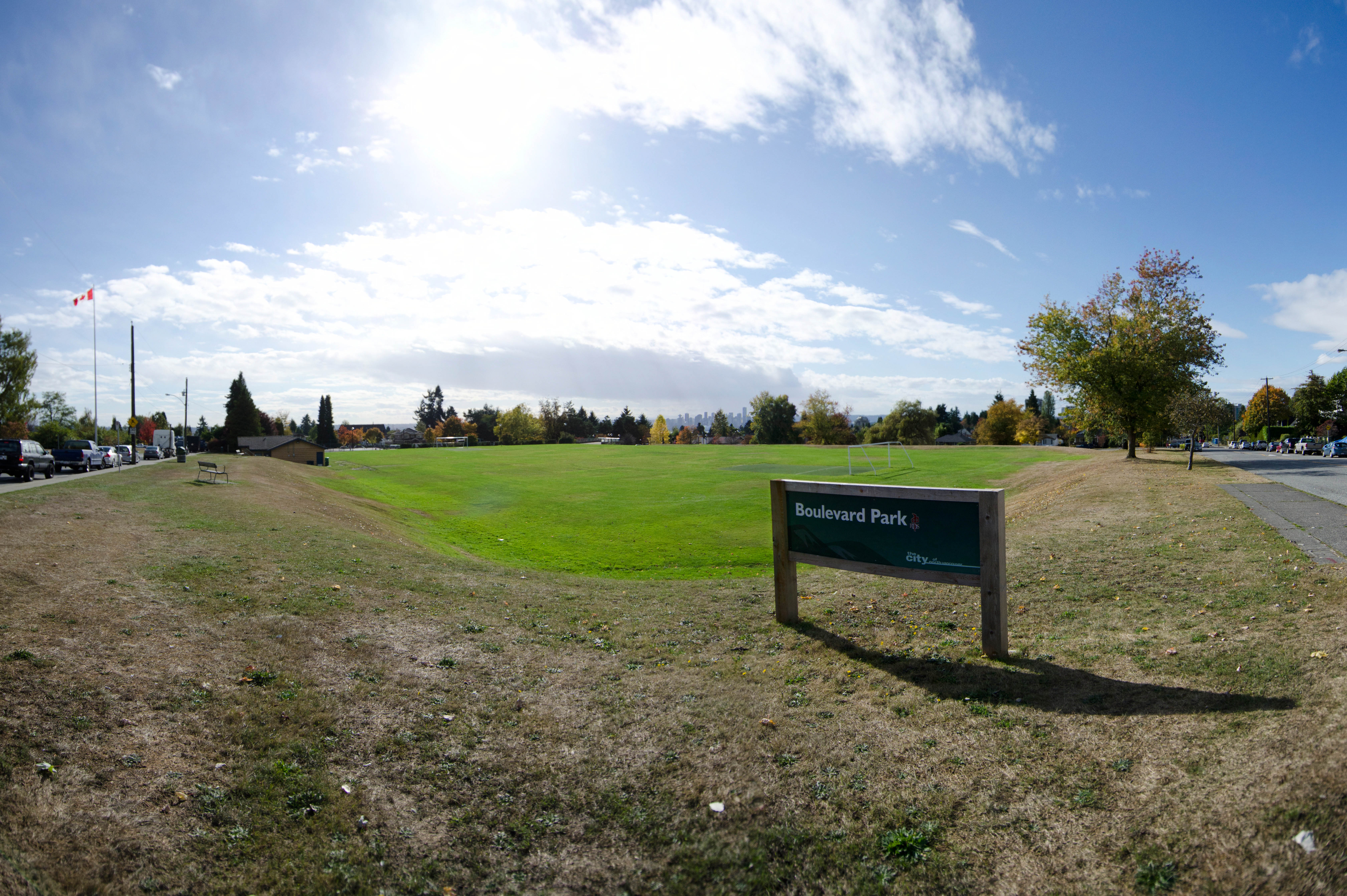
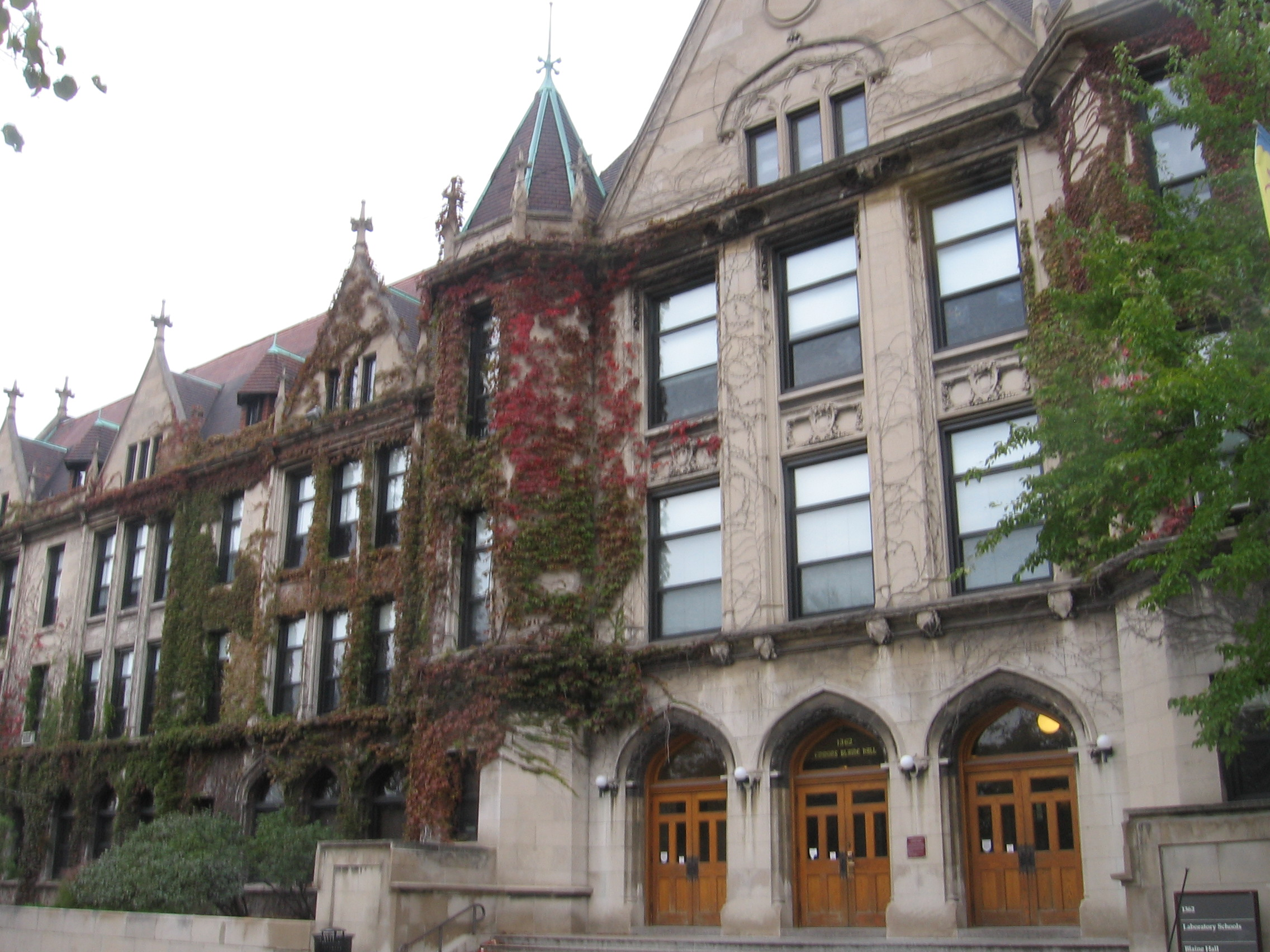
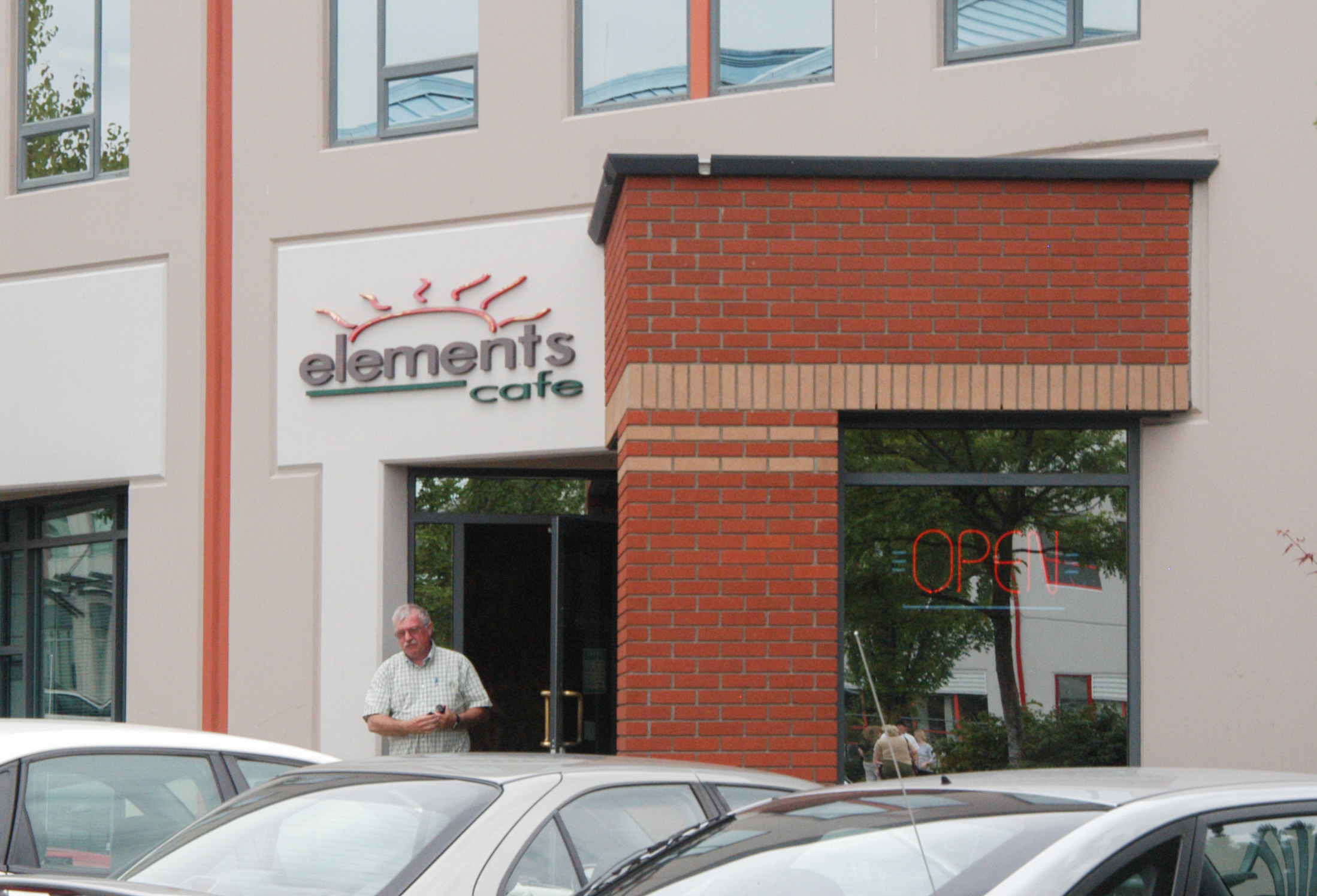
A residence on Edinburgh Street in North Burnaby used as the home of Daniel Jackson (top left), Boulevard Park in North Vancouver was used for scenes of Sam and Pete (top right), the interior of Elements Cafe in Burnaby also featured (bottom left). An exterior shot of University of Chicago Laboratory Schools (pictured bottom right) features as the office of Daniel Jackson, however filming actually took place at North Vancouver Museum & Archives.

For Daniel's office at The University of Chicago filming took place at then home of North Vancouver Museum & Archives on West 4th Street in North Vancouver. Andrew Jackson stepped in as director of photography at this location due to Woeste directing "Inauguration" at the time. Exterior shots of the University of Chicago Laboratory Schools were inserted during editing. The community hall attached to the Saint Nicholas and Dimitrios Greek Orthodox Church down the road from The Bridge Studios was used for the 60th wedding anniversary ballroom dance that Sam and Pete attend. Amanda Tapping wore her own Betsey Johnson dress for the scenes. Producer and director Andy Mikita's Funk-soul band The Hip Replacements were the act performing at the ballroom dance. The production team created a poster featuring executive producer Robert C. Cooper sporting a top hat, dancing with production accountant & wife of Peter Woeste, Nicole Forest. In Waring's original cut, the dance scene opened with a close-up of the poster before panning round to Sam and Pete. Despite objections from Waring and Kindler, Cooper rearranged the shots during editing and removed the close-up. Posters were subsequently put around the shows production offices at The Bridge Studios. Parents of executive producer John Smith appear onscreen as the couple celebrating their 60th wedding anniversary, with the couple having hit the milestone in real life that past November. Elements Cafe located across the street from The Bridge Studios was also used.

Amanda Tapping commented that "Chimera was interesting because it didn't feel like a Stargate episode" and that she felt "very out of my element, wearing high heeled shoes and skirts", noting that the shows costume set supervisor Barry Peters felt it was more like "shooting a movie of the week" or a "Harlequin romance".

== Release ==
=== Broadcast and ratings ===
"Chimera" first aired on January 20, 2004, on Sky One in the United Kingdom. In the United States, the episode first aired on January 30, 2004, on the Sci-Fi Channel. The episode reportedly earned a 1.9 household rating, equating to approximately 2.3 million viewers. Stargate SG-1 continued to be the Sci-Fi Channel's highest rated show, maintaining the same rating as previous episode "Fallout". Ultimately the episode's 1.9 rating would make it the joint third most popular episode of the seventh season. Upon first being syndicated on February 7, 2005, in the United States, the episode scored a 2.0 household rating, equating to approximately 2.2 million households. "Chimera" was first shown in Canada on December 16, 2004, on SPACE.

=== Reception ===
Paul Spragg for Starburst awarded the episode a full 5 out of 5, calling it "Simply done, but very enjoyable". Spragg praised the character development and chemistry between the couples as being "spot on", whilst also highlighting the episode for its "great comic moments". Jayne Dearsley for SFX also awarded the episode the full 5 out of 5, and similarly directed their praise at what they called "wonderful character moments - too many to count", also complementing the chemistry between Shanks and Plowman. Dearsley also appreciated the decision to have Daniel Jackson save Sarah from the Goa'uld Osiris after being unable to save his wife Sha're from Amaunet earlier in the show. Writing for TV Zone, Jan Vincent-Rudzki called the episode "undoubtedly one of the highlights of this season", giving it 9 out of 10. Although Vincent-Rudzki was critical of the Daniel Jackson and Sarah storyline, writing the "story takes too long to get going and doesn't really spark any interest much before its conclusion", but did however enjoy the Sam and Pete romance for its "charming dialogue which is a pleasure to hear". The TV Zone reviewer went on to say "'Awe' has been missing for a lot of this season, and so when down-to-Earth Pete encounters his first alien his reaction is a reminder of that thrill from previous adventures". Marco Lanzagorta for Popmatters called Samantha Carter humming the Stargate SG-1 theme tune "delightful".

The response from fansite Gateworld was mixed. Alli Snow criticised the episode for being "more concerned with 'getting Sam a guy who doesn't die' than writing a single, solid story", but did enjoy the interplay between Daniel and Osiris/Sarah as well as the scenes with Teal'c "finally getting the opportunity to show some humor and extracurricular interests". In a more positive fan review on Gateworld, Lex called "Chimera" "one of those episodes that leaves you with a smile on your face", praising Amanda Tapping for playing the part of a "charmed and content woman beautifully" and believing that "David DeLuise complemented that performance with a confident and cheeky portrayal of Pete". Writer and producer Joseph Mallozzi observed that the response from fans online to the line "There's no zoo in Colorado Springs" was particularly surprising to the writers. The series fictional setting of Stargate Command is set within the Cheyenne Mountain Complex in Colorado Springs, with Cheyenne Mountain Zoo located close by. Many fans complained that this was an oversight from the writers, however Mallozzi commented that the line was intended to subtly poke fun at Carter for being so invested in her work on the base, that she "hasn't even taken the time to have a social life", with the writer reflecting that "It was a throw-away that was, perhaps, a little too subtle".

The episode marks the first appearance of Samantha Carter's love interest, Pete Shanahan, with fans coining the name "Stalker Pete" for the character. Author of the Stargate SG-1 Illustrated Companion Thomasina Gibson wrote "Good grief! If ever a character stirred up controversy it was the lovely Pete Shanahan. He waltzed in, swept Sam Carter onto slinky high-heeled feet and sent the internet into overdrive as fans fought to decide whether or not he deserved the moniker 'Stalker Pete'." Snow for Gateworld wrote "Perhaps doing a background check on and following a potential partner around town comes off as cute and concerned to some. But to others, it possibly harkens back to Sam's propensity to attract guys with stalker tendencies", highlighting previous love-interests of Samantha Carter, Narim in "Between Two Fires" and Orlin in "Ascension" who he believed also exhibited stalking tendencies. Of Shanahan, Spragg called the character "a perfect foil for Carter, romantic, funny and smart", whilst Vincent-Rudzki wrote "David Deluise plays Pete beautifully and the chemistry between him and Sam works perfectly".

=== Home media ===
"Chimera" along with the episodes Grace", "Fallout" and "Death Knell" were first released on Region 2 DVD on May 3, 2004 as part of the "Volume 35" standalone disc, before being released as part of the Season 7 boxset on October 19, 2004. The episodes audio commentary is provided by director Will Waring, director of photography Peter F. Woeste and writer Damian Kindler. "Chimera" along with the rest of season 7 was first made available digitally in January 2008 through iTunes and Amazon Unbox. The episode, along with every other episode of the series, were made available to stream for the first time through Netflix in the USA on August 15, 2010. The episode, along with the rest of the series has been upscaled for releases on various streaming platforms and the 2020 Blu-ray release.
