= Fallout (Stargate SG-1) =

- Stargate SG-1 episode
- Episode no.: Season 7 Episode 14
- Directed by: Martin Wood
- Written by: Corin Nemec
- Teleplay by: Joseph Mallozzi and Paul Mullie
- Cinematography by: Jim Menard
- Editing by: Eric Hill
- Original air date: January 13, 2004

Guest appearances
- Corin Nemec as Jonas Quinn; Emily Holmes as Kianna Cyr; Gillian Barber as First Minister Dreylock; Patricia Drake as Lucia Tarthus; Julian Christopher as Vin Eremal; Bill Nikolai as Vern Alberts

Episode chronology
← Previous "Grace"	Next → "Chimera"

"Fallout" is the 14th episode from the seventh season of military science fiction adventure television show Stargate SG-1 and is the 146th overall. It was first broadcast on January 13, 2004, on Sky One in the United Kingdom. The story was created by Corin Nemec, with Joseph Mallozzi & Paul Mullie writing the teleplay. It was directed by Martin Wood.

In the episode, Jonas Quinn (Corin Nemec) arrives at Stargate Command seeking the help of SG-1 to prevent the destruction of his home planet of Langara. Quinn explains that Kelownan scientists believe an underground vein of the mineral Naquadah is transforming into the much more powerful and unstable Naquadria.

The episode marks the final onscreen appearance of Jonas Quinn who was first introduced in the season five episode "Meridian", before being made a series regular during the shows sixth season.

== Plot ==
Jonas Quinn (Corin Nemec) arrives at Stargate Command seeking the help of his former SG-1 teammates in saving his home planet of Langara. He tells SG-1 and General Hammond (Don S. Davis) that scientists on his world discovered that naquadria, the super-powerful alien mineral found on Langara, is not in fact native to the planet. The mineral was in fact created by a Goa'uld, who found a way to slowly transform the planets naquadah into the much more powerful naquadria, in a process Jonas' people have now discovered is still ongoing and threatens to bring the destruction of the planet should the transformation continue.

Samantha Carter (Amanda Tapping) goes to Kelowna on Langara where she's presented with Jonas' research. Jonas also introduces her to his assistant Kianna Cyr (Emily Holmes). In the meantime the representatives of the three major powers of Langara arrive on Earth, where they are presented with the fact that although the centre of the catastrophe will lie in Kelowna, the whole planet will then be uninhabitable. They are then presented with the fact that it was an earlier test of a naqahdriah bomb by the Kelownans which caused the chain reaction that is in fact causing the reaction within the planet. This causes much outrage from the representatives until Jack O'Neill (Richard Dean Anderson) loses his patience.

In Kelowna, Sam finds a way to solve the problem by causing a much greater explosion near the naqahdriah and Jonas shows her a vehicle which can dig into earth. By using the vehicle and Tok'ra tunnel crystals, Jonas believes they would be able to go deep enough into the planet, so Teal'c (Christopher Judge) goes to the Tok'ra to bring some of them back. While Sam is checking the digger she talks with Jonas about Kianna, who, unknown to them, injects herself with something in the laboratory. Later Sam finds out that the machine uses Goa'uld technology and they find out that Kianna is a Goa'uld. When they confront her she reveals that she works for Ba'al but that she also wants to save the planet.

Because all of their simulations with the digger fail, they decide to take the Goa'uld on board to help make modifications during the digger's operation. In the meantime, the delegates on Earth face the problem that Ba'al may come to the planet because the Goa'uld in Kianna hasn't made contact with him. However, they decide to ignore this problem and instead concentrate on the possible evacuation, however, due to their continued bickering Jack tells them that Earth won't help them.

In the digger the Goa'uld and Sam are able to solve problems as they occur whilst boring down into the planet. However, they finally get stuck and the only way to come close enough to the naqahdriah vein is by using the tunnel crystals to create a tunnel large enough for a single person to get down. Because the tunnel would be filled with toxic gas and heat the Goa'uld decides to go, as her symbiote will sustain her. The Goa'uld is able to plant the bomb, but is seriously weakened and struggles in returning to the vehicle. Back on board, the vehicle races against its fast depleting power reserves, but is just about able to successfully return to the surface. At Stargate Command the parties are informed that the mission was a success. Kianna's Goa'uld dies, but saves the host.

== Production ==
=== Development and writing ===
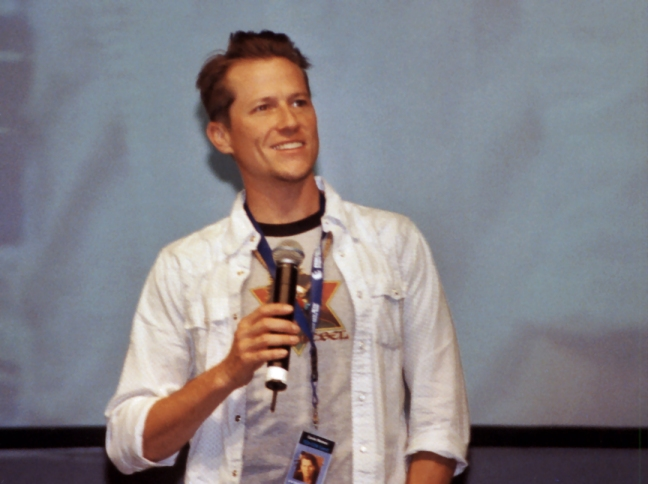
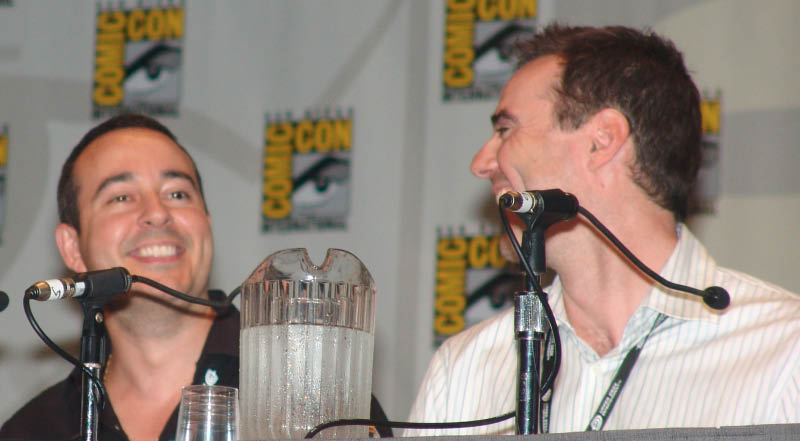
Corin Nemec (top) helped come up with the story. Writers Joseph Mallozzi (bottom left) & Paul Mullie (bottom right) then developed it further and wrote the screenplay.

The episode's story was thought up by actor Corin Nemec who portrays the character Jonas Quinn on the show, with co-producers Joseph Mallozzi and Paul Mullie writing the teleplay. Nemec had been a main cast member for the previous season and was encouraged by the shows executive producers Brad Wright and Robert C. Cooper that should he have any story ideas he should pitch them. Nemec exited the show in the episode "Homecoming", which was the second episode of season seven, however had a three-episode contract. Having not previously written for television, the shows writing team provided Nemec with "their beat sheets" and assistance with how best to pitch for the series. According to Nemec, he pitched 3-5 different ideas to Cooper, one of which had the working title of "Deep Core". Nemec originally envisioned this story as taking place on Earth, however Cooper felt that it was too similar to another story that was being developed at the time and suggested that Nemec rework his story to take place on Jonas Quinn's homeworld.

Nemec then worked with Cooper to further refine the story. This involved removing a subplot that would have taken place alongside the main story involving Daniel Jackson "getting caught up in" a coup d'état, as it had become "too big of an episode". According to Nemec, he put together the "basics of a story" in the form of "beats and moments" with "no dialogue written" which Joseph Mallozzi and Paul Mullie then "made an episode out of".

Writer Paul Mullie felt that the Kelownan's having constructed digger that was able to tunnel into the planets core was "a big buy" given the Kelownan's level of technology. Mullie described that there were "sort of steps" which "all came very quickly" during writing and that these helped make the story unfold and make the drill more plausible. According to Mullie "one of the major changes" made to Nemec's story was that the drill would not be journeying to the core of the planet and instead would only tunnel a small number of miles. Introducing the Goa'uld character who inhabits a Kelownan called Kianna Cyr, the writers imagined that "she improved the digger" for the Kelownan's, but felt "it still wasn't good enough to do this quite frankly really incredible thing" so the writers added "an extra alien technology element, which was to use Tok'ra tunnel crystals" to augment the tunnelling process.

Originally titled "Turn of Events", the episode also had the working title "Deep Core" at one point during its development. Nemec later retitled it to be "Pressure Point", a reference to "unstable nature of the planet" both politically and geological, before finally settling on the name "Fallout". Mullie named the planet Langara, after the Vancouver golf course of the same name.

=== Cast and characters ===
Corin Nemec makes his final appearance on Stargate as Jonas Quinn. Nemec, who hadn't filmed for the series in a number of months asked Joseph Mallozzi if he could keep his haircut at the time, which unbeknownst to Mallozzi was remarkably similar to the haircut of Jonas' love interest for the episode, played by Emily Holmes. According to Mullie it wasn't until reviewing the first days footage that they realised. Emily Holmes was cast as Kianna Cyr, a Kelownan research assistant to Jonas Quinn, who is secretly a Goa'uld working for Ba'al. When writing Kianna, Mullie considered how the Goa'uld characters could sometimes be two dimensional and therefore wanted to create a more layered character "who wasn't a System Lord, wasn't a big villain" and "who wasn't clear cut evil". It was written that Kianna would have "loyalties to a System Lord but wasn't necessarily going to follow through on them" as they "may or may not have developed a relationship". Gillian Barber returns as First Minister Dreylock, making her final appearance on the show, whilst Bill Nikolai's character Vern Alberts makes his final appearance, although Nikolai continued working on the show as Richard Dean Anderson's photo double. Patricia Drake and Julian Christopher play the characters of Lucia Tarthus and Vin Eremal, whilst director Martin Wood and Dan Shea make uncredited cameos as technician and Siler.

=== Design ===
In the episode, the Kelownan's have constructed a boring machine in order to tunnel into the planet and reach a vein of naquadah. As a cost saving measure, the shows production originally planned for the interior set of the drill to be a redress of the Sebrus space ship set from the episode "Space Race", however production designer Bridget McGuire ultimately opted to rebuild the set almost entirely. The Sebrus set had originally been built on a gimble, but due to the issues this caused during filming it was decided the new set should constructed on the studio floor. McGuire designed the drill to be a "relatively small set" with a "low ceiling" and lots of "pipes and gadgets". Like the Sebrus set, only one room was built, which would be dressed as the main control bridge, then would be converted become the engine room set. Writer Paul Mullie wanted the drill to look like "what the future would look like as pictured by someone in the 30's". As the show had previously established the technology level and aesthetics of Jonas' people in previous episodes, McQuire's team sought to continue these design ques in creating the drill set. Art director Peter Bodarus described the look as "1940's industrial" and took design ques from World War II submarines with Bodarus imagining "the ship would be driven much like an old-fashioned tank with two brake levers". As a cost saving measure, chairs from the Prometheus set were repainted and used on the drill set.

There were extensive conversations during writing and preproduction about how best to depict the drill digging into the planet. Writer Paul Mullie noted that "we were a bit concerned when we started to think about the concept and realised 'we're never going to see what's happening outside the ship" and that the action was only "going to play on their faces", worrying that the episode might feel "too claustrophobic". Consideration was given to having visual effects shots illustrate the digging process, such as having a computer generated shot as though a camera were mounted to the hull of the drill, however director Martin Wood noted the questions of "what's lighting this" and "what are you going to see" dissuaded them from using visual effects. In order to give some visual representation to where the drill was, Bridget McQuire's team introduced electronic display screens to the drill.

=== Filming ===
The episode was directed by Martin Wood. Filming took place in June 2003. As with many episodes, Wood tried to find new ways of shooting scenes in the Stargate Command briefing room. Wood separated the briefing room table and began the sequence by bringing the camera up from in the middle of the two halves. The table was then pushed together as the camera pulls back, revealing the full table. According to Wood, Corin Nemec had not had time to prepare the first day filming in the Stargate Command briefing room and therefore had his script sides positioned out of view of the camera during filming. For the scenes where the drill was in motion, an image shaker was used on the camera to help give the impression of movement, furthermore a device was fitted to the exterior of the set to make the set ceiling move. Due to the noise this generated, dialog had to be re-recorded during post-production. Production created Tok'ra tunnels from styrofoam. The tunnel set was designed to be much smaller than previous depictions, which Wood was ultimately unsatisfied with during filming. The director had hoped to only use shots looking downward, into the tunnel and cut everything else, however the episode length made this impossible. The shows visual effects building was used as the exterior of Kelowna.

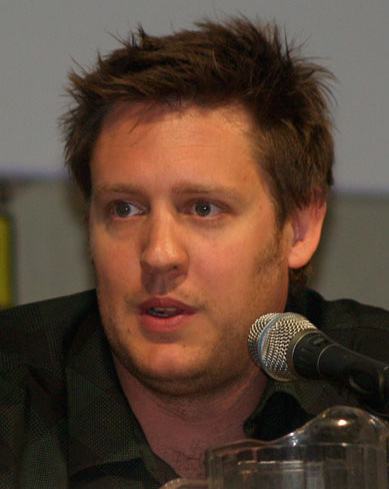
Visual effects artist Neill Blomkamp of Vancouver based effects studio The Embassy Visual Effects modelled and lit the drill.

The visual effects shots of the city of Kelowna were revised and reused from the episode "Homecoming", with Anubis' mothership removed. The digger visual effects model was created by Neill Blomkamp at The Embassy Visual Effects It was originally scripted that the digger would emerge from the ground in Kelownan desert, which would be depicted through visual effects, however the budget for the episode came in too high and therefore the shot was dropped.

== Release ==
=== Broadcast and ratings ===
"Fallout" was first broadcast on January 6, 2004, on Sky One in the United Kingdom. The episode was watched by approximately 760,000 viewers and was the eighth most popular broadcast on Sky One that week. It was then shown for the first time in the United States on January 23, 2004, on Sci Fi, earning a Nielsen rating of 1.9, equating to approximately 2.3 million viewers. In Canada the episode was first shown on December 9, 2004, on SPACE. The episode was first syndicated in the United States during the week of January 24, 2005 and achieved a 2.2 household rating, equating to approximately 2.4 million.

A deleted scene between Jonas, Carter and Hammond from the episode was posted on the official Sci Fi website on January 24, 2004.

=== Reception ===
Reviews for the episode were mixed. Jan Vincent-Rudzki for TV Zone awarded the episode 9 out of 10 and called it a "pleasure" to see Jonas again, however felt it was a "pity" that "it is only he and Sam who really spend much time together". Jayne Dearsley for SFX awarded the episode 4 out of 5, writing "This isn't a bad little yarn, all told, with some tense moments and a smattering of humour", highlighting the return of Jonas Quinn. Dearsley did however criticize the lack of Teal'c in the episode, and also felt the threat to the planet was poorly executed onscreen, writing "With the whole planet under threat, why ore only three people working on a solution?". Paul Spragg for Starburst awarded the episode 2 out of 5 writing "the whole story is people sitting about talking, and it quickly becomes soporific". Continuing his review, the Spragg bemoaned the lack of visual effects showing the actual drilling taking place, arguing that "the panel displays inside don't really bring much tension to the proceedings". Spragg did however call it "lovely to see Corin Nemec on the show again", however felt he should "try harder on the story for his next attempt". Reviewing for Stargate fansite Gateworld, Alli Snow positively received the episode, calling it "especially refreshing and fun, a nice mixture of action, intrigue and humor that reminds us what a versatile show Stargate really is".

Reviewers also noted similarities to 2003 film The Core, with Dearsley writing "This is remarkably similar to that recent blockbuster although on a much smaller scale, obviously. It's also rather good, in exactly the some kind of twee, campy way", whilst Vincent-Rudzki wrote "although this has a lesser budget it is more exciting".

=== Home media ===
"Fallout" along with the episodes "Chimera", "Fallout" and "Death Knell" were first released on Region 2 DVD on May 3, 2004, as part of the "Volume 35" standalone disc, before being released as part of the Season 7 boxset on October 19, 2004. The episode's audio commentary features director Martin Wood, writer and producer Paul Mullie and visual effects supervisor James Tichenor. "Fallout" along with the rest of season 7 was first made available digitally in January 2008 through iTunes and Amazon Unbox. The episode, along with every other episode of the series, were made available to stream for the first time through Netflix in the USA on August 15, 2010. The episode, along with the rest of the series has been upscaled for releases on various streaming platforms and the 2020 Blu-ray release.
