= Death Knell (Stargate SG-1) =

- Stargate SG-1 episode
- Episode no.: Season 7 Episode 16
- Directed by: Peter DeLuise
- Written by: Peter DeLuise
- Cinematography by: Andrew D. Wilson
- Editing by: Rick Martin
- Original air date: January 27, 2004
- Running time: 44 minutes

Guest appearances
- Carmen Argenziano as Jacob Carter / Selmak; Sebastian Spence as Delek; Mark Gibbon as M'zel; Dan Shea as Siler; Gary Jones as Walter Harriman; Eric Breker as Colonel Renyolds; Nels Lennarson as Major Green; Dan Payne as Kull Warrior; Sam MacMillan as Lt. Glenn

Episode chronology
← Previous "Chimera"	Next → "Heroes"
- Stargate SG-1 (season 7)

"Death Knell" is the 16th episode from the seventh season of military science fiction adventure television show Stargate SG-1 and is the 148th overall. It was first broadcast on January 27, 2004, on Sky One in the United Kingdom. The episode was written and directed by Peter DeLuise.

In the episode, Samantha Carter (Amanda Tapping) and Jacob Carter / Selmak (Carmen Argenziano) are developing a prototype weapon to fight Anubis's Super Soldiers at the Alpha Site when they are attacked. After the base is destroyed, Carter is relentlessly pursued by one of the Super Soldiers. Meanwhile, the fragile alliance between the Tok'ra, Rebel Jaffa and Earth hangs in the balance.

The episode continues on from the events of the season six episode "Allegiance" and season seven episode "Evolution".

== Plot ==
Major Samantha Carter (Amanda Tapping) and Jacob Carter / Selmak (Carmen Argenziano) are at Stargate Command's offworld base, the Alpha Site, working on a prototype of a weapon designed to kill Anubis's Super Soldiers. Soon, the base is attacked by Anubis' forces and Stargate Command personnel begin to evacuate to the Beta Site. At Stargate Command General George Hammond (Don S. Davis) informs Colonel Jack O'Neill (Richard Dean Anderson), Dr. Daniel Jackson (Stargate) (Michael Shanks) and Teal'c (Christopher Judge) of the attack and the fact that many personnel, including Carter are still missing. O'Neill, Daniel, Teal'c & Colonel Reynolds team head to the Alpha Site and begin their search. They soon locate a number of survivors including rebel Jaffa, Tok'ra and Stargate Command personnel, and not long after that they find Jacob who gives O'Neill the prototype weapon.

Daniel and Jacob head back to Stargate Command with the other survivors where Hammond has begun an investigation to find out who leaked the location of their secret offworld base. Jacob tells Daniel that he believes Anubis knew they were creating a weapon that could neutralise his Super Soldiers and that the soldier was likely now hunting Sam as she has the designs. Stargate Command launch a unmanned aerial vehicle armed with missiles, however it is soon shot down by the Super Soldier who is hunting Sam through a forest. Sam locates the downed UAV and manually fires its missile at the soldier, however it survives and continues its attack. Teal'c arrives and draws its attention, whilst Jack is able to retrieve the power source for the weapon from Sam, who uses it to successfully kill the Super Soldier.

At Stargate Command, having learnt that a Tok'ra spy unwillingly gave away details of the Alpha Site after being captured by Anubis, the Tok'ra and Jaffa inform Hammond that they will not be moving to the Beta Site and that both parties wish to go their own way. The tripart alliance seems to be breaking up.

== Production ==
=== Development and writing ===
The episode was written by Peter DeLuise. One of his main inspirations came from the logging which was taking place around the Mount Seymour Provincial Park, which had previously served as the filming location of the Alpha Site in the season six episode "Allegiance". According to DeLuise, he "half kidding" suggested to showrunner Robert C. Cooper that they "do an episode where the thing is blown up, and all the trees have gone down". Cooper approved the idea and they subsequently developed it into an episode. DeLuise wrote the episode "very fast"In order to take advantage of the location.

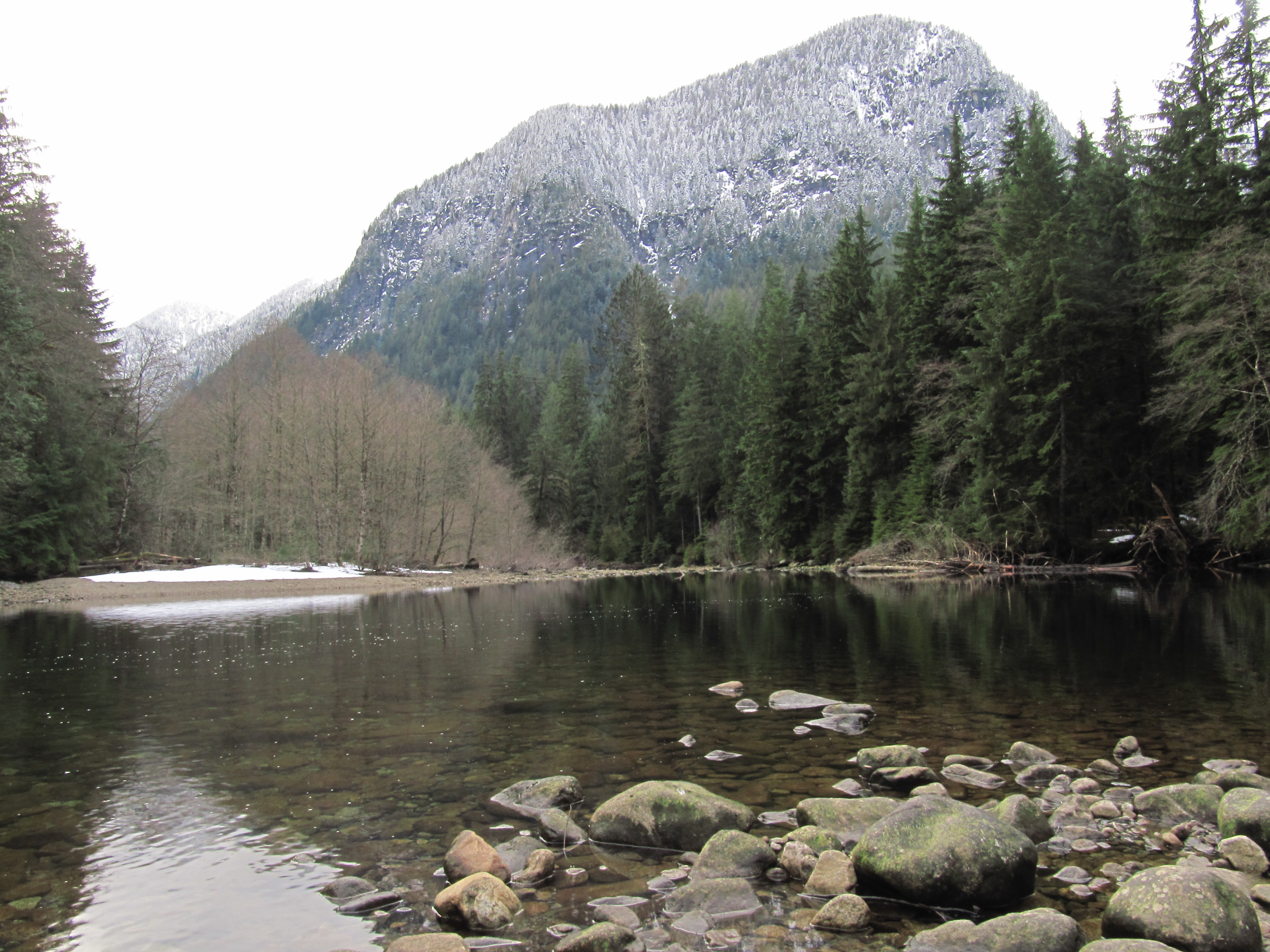
Filming took place around the Mount Seymour Provincial Park and Lower Seymour Conservation Reserve (pictured) in North Vancouver.

For his story, DeLuise continued on from events established in his episode "Allegiance", dealing with the alliance between Earth, the Tok'ra and Rebel Jaffa. In preparation for the season finale which would see Anubis attack Earth, DeLuise wanted the episode to further isolate Earth from its allies "so that they wouldn't come speeding to our help so easily, so that we would look a little more helpless", and therefore used the destruction of the Alpha Site to "disintegrate the alliance" between the three factions. The question of who was responsible for allowing the location of the Alpha Site to fall into the hands of Anubis would play a key role in the episode and DeLuise quickly realised that Anubis could have learnt the location from his probing of Jonas Quinn in the episode "Fallen", therefore it would be established in the story that this was an entirely new base.

=== Cast and filming ===
Carmen Argenziano reprises his role as Jacob Carter / Selmak and Dan Payne returns as the Super Soldier. The episode introduces the Rebel Jaffa M'zel, portrayed by Mark Gibbon. Gibbon previously portrayed a human version of Thor in the episode "Thor's Chariot". Sebastian Spence guest stars as Delek, a Tok'ra. The character was named after Derek Lowe who worked on the show as a behind the scenes video producer. Dan Shea, Gary Jones and Eric Breker reprise their roles as Siler, Technician and Colonel Renyolds. Nels Lennarson and Sam MacMillan portray Lt. Glenn and Major Green.

The episode was directed by Peter DeLuise, whilst Andrew Wilson served as cinematographer. Filming took place in late July 2003, the episodes "Chimera" and "Grace" were also shooting at the same time. As Amanda Tapping was being heavily featured in both "Grace" and "Chimera", the episode's story and filming was structured so that Tapping would be able to complete all her scenes in just two days of photography. The exterior scenes were filmed around Mount Seymour Provincial Park and Lower Seymour Conservation Reserve in North Vancouver. For the prototype weapon that would kill the Super Soldier, art director James Robbins designed a piece that attached to an existing weapon from the show, the Transphase Eradication Rod gun. The new piece would light up when snapped onto the T.E.R.

== Reception ==
=== Broadcast and ratings ===
"Death Knell" first aired on January 27, 2004, on Sky One in the United Kingdom. It was watched by approximately 759,000 households and was the channels 9th most popular broadcast that week. In the United States, the episode first aired on February 6, 2004, on the Sci-Fi Channel. Stargate SG-1 continued to be the Sci-Fi Channel's highest rated show to air that week, reportedly earning a 1.9 household rating, equating to approximately 2.3 million viewers. "Death Knell" was first shown in Canada on December 23, 2004, on SPACE.

=== Reception ===
Response to the episode was mixed. Jan Vincent-Rudzki for TV Zone awarded the episode 5 out of 10, comparing it to the Star Trek episode "Arena". Vincent-Rudzki felt that whilst it was "probably a credible conclusion" to the Earth, Jaffa & Tok'ra Alliance, he "didn't really care", believing that it was possibly a "money saving" episode. Paul Spragg for Starburst awarded the episode 2 out 5, believing that writer & director Peter DeLuise "disguises a story that's been done to death as something new and almost gets away with it". Spragg was of the opinion that after "interminable tales showing the lack of trust between the Jaffa and Tok'ra" resulting in the alliance's dissolution "shouldn't need an entire episode", although felt that the episode gave "Argenziano's Jacob some of the best material he's had in a long while as he tries to mend bridges". Jayne Dearsley for SFX was also critical, calling the episode "action-packed and stuffed with big-stakes drama and conflict. It's got battles, explosions, life-and-death situations and intrigue. Shame none of it comes together into an episode you really enjoy watching". Dearsley did however highlight the "brilliant acting", singling out Carmen Argenziano's performance.

James Hoare for The Companion positively received the episode for how it made Carter "real", writing "This is a Sam Carter we rarely see. With no toys to tinker with and no team to inspire, what remains? Is this wounded and weary woman in battered battledress more than the sum of her parts?". Hoare praised seeing the character in a situation "like nothing we had seen before" going on to write "We’re often shown glimpses of Jack’s special forces training, but this is our first sustained encounter with Sam’s own fieldcraft". Writing for Tor.com Keith R.A. DeCandido was critical of "not enough time" being spent on "Carter's plight". DeCandido believing Jacob Carter being marginalized by his fellow Tok'ra was an "interesting plot point" but felt that "neither Sebastian Spence’s Tok’ra nor Mark Gibbon’s Jaffa is anyone we give a damn about", instead suggesting that the presence of Bra'tac and an established Tok'ra character would have made the plotline "much more convincing". Reviewing for fansite Gateworld, Alli Snow praised the episode, believing it had "terrific balance" between "political intrigue and action". Snow called Carmen Argenziano "the star of the show" as well as praising the "wonderful" character additions, such as Delek and M'Zel.

Samantha Carter resting her head on Jack O'Neill's shoulder was commented upon by both reviewers as well as the cast and crew. Snow for Gateworld appreciated the character moment, calling it a "a rare scene of one character comforting another after a harrowing experience" and asking "Who doesn't love that?". Dearsley felt the moment "shows her as a real human being for once and is a lovely touch". Hoare meanwhile wrote "it's tempting to view it through the giddy glee of ‘shipping, but this moment of rare physical affection between the two is deeper and more nuanced than that. It's a comradeship honed through experience, battle, trauma, and love". Tapping commented that she originally "balked" at the scene as she felt it made Carter "look weak" and believed that O'Neill would not comfort Teal'c or Daniel in that way. DeLuise justification was that "she's been through hell, she deserves to be comforted for a second", also acknowledging the relationship & chemistry between the two characters.

=== Home media ===
"Death Knell" along with the episodes "Grace", "Fallout" and "Chimera" were first released on Region 2 DVD on May 3, 2004, as part of the "Volume 35" standalone disc, before being released as part of the Season 7 boxset on October 19, 2004. The episodes audio commentary is provided by director Peter DeLuise and actor Amanda Tapping. "Death Knell" along with the rest of season 7 was first made available digitally in January 2008 through iTunes and Amazon Unbox. The episode, along with every other episode of the series, were made available to stream for the first time through Netflix in the USA on August 15, 2010. The episode, along with the rest of the series has been upscaled for releases on various streaming platforms and the 2020 Blu-ray release.
