= Evolution (Stargate SG-1) =

- Stargate SG-1 episodes
- Episode nos.: Season 7 Episodes 11 & 12
- Directed by: Peter DeLuise
- Written by: Damian Kindler, Michael Shanks & Peter DeLuise
- Cinematography by: Jim Menard
- Editing by: Brad Rines
- Original air dates: August 22, 2003; January 9, 2004
- Running time: 44 minutes; 44 minutes

Guest appearances
- Enrico Colantoni as Agent Burke; Carmen Argenziano as Jacob Carter / Selmak; Tony Amendola as Bra'tac; Bill Dow as Dr. Lee; David Palffy as Anubis; Frank Roman as Rafael; Zak Santiago as Rogelio Duran; Dan Payne as Super Soldiers

Episode chronology
← Previous "Birthright"	Next → "Grace"
- Stargate SG-1 (season 7)

"Evolution" (Parts 1 & 2) are the 11th and 12th episodes from seventh season of the science fiction television series Stargate SG-1. Part 1 was co-written by Damien Kindler and Michael Shanks, with Kindler adapting the story into a teleplay, whilst part 2 was written by Peter Deluise and Damien Kindler, with Deluise handling the teleplay as well as directing the episode. Part 1 was first broadcast on August 22, 2003, on Sci-Fi Channel in the United States, with part 2 subsequently airing first in the on Sky One in United Kingdom on December 14, 2003, following the shows mid-season hiatus in the US.

In the episode, Stargate Command and its allies encounter a new enemy "Super Soldier", who is impervious to their weapons. Believing that the Goa'uld Anubis has created this enemy using Ancient technology, Dr. Jackson (Michael Shanks) travels to Honduras to investigate a similar device mentioned in legend. Meanwhile, the rest of SG-1 along with their allies Bra'tac (Tony Amendola) and Jacob Carter (Carmen Argenziano) hatch a plan to capture one of the soldiers alive.

The writers wanted to introduce a new enemy in response to more and more of the Jaffa defecting and turning against the Goa'uld, as well as creating a soldier that was a much more powerful adversary. "Evolution" part 2 broke rating records for the Sci-Fi Channel as the channels most watch broadcast to-date, as well as being the most watch episode of Stargate SG-1.

== Plot ==
=== Part 1 ===
Teal'c (Christopher Judge) and Bra'tac (Tony Amendola) have travelled to a planet to investigate the meeting between two opposing Goa'uld's, Tilgath and Ramius. They arrive to discover that both sides were massacred by a single enemy soldier, who soon attacks Teal'c & Bra'tac. Initially the soldier seems impervious to their weapons, but is eventually killed by Teal'c and taken back to Stargate Command where they inform SG-1 and General Hammond (Don S. Davis). Jacob Carter (Carmen Argenziano) arrives and together, he and Samantha Carter (Amanda Tapping) examine the warrior, and soon make the discovery that it was created in a laboratory and given life by Goa'uld symbiote. They also determine that it was not Teal'c that killed the being, but rather it suffered a heart attack. Noticing similarities between the soldier's armour and the technology of the Goa'uld Sarcophagus, Jacob explains that a Goa'uld named Telchak created the first Sarcophagus thousands of years earlier, basing it on an Ancient device that has since been lost. Dr. Daniel Jackson (Michael Shanks) recalls that his grandfather, Nicholas Ballard, had conducted research on the supposed location fountain of youth, linking it to the Maya civilization. Jackson and Jacob believe that Ballard's research might lead them to the location of the lost Ancient device.

Jack O'Neill (Richard Dean Anderson), Samantha, Teal'c, Bra'tac and an SG team travel to a planet held by the Goa'uld Ramius. Believing that Anubis will try to finish the job and kill Ramius, the team plan to capture a super soldier alive. After the soldier is impervious to their stun dart and subsequent traps, the team are captured and imprisoned by Ramius. After being freed, the team are able to steal a Goa'uld cargo ship and use the ring-transporter to capture the super soldier.

Hoping to find the Telchak device, Dr. Jackson, along with Dr. Lee (Bill Dow) have travelled to Honduras, where Rogelio (Zak Santiago), a guide, takes them into the jungle in search of the temple described in Ballard's notes. After locating the device and escaping the temple as it floods, the group are captured by Honduran revolutionaries who believe them to be thieves they can hold for ransom money. Rogelio tries to escape but is shot.

The captured super soldier has been taken back to Stargate Command for interrogation, but the being is unwilling to say anything more than it serves Anubis. Jacob believes they can use a Tok'ra memory recall device to access its mind and in doing so they are able to identify Anubis' planet of operations. General Hammond informs O'Neill, Carter and Teal'c that Dr. Jackson and Dr. Lee have been kidnapped and likely taken into Nicaragua.

=== Part 2 ===
In the rebel camp in Nicaragua, Daniel is questioned by their leader Rafael (Frank Roman), but refuses to tell him who they work for or what the device is that they recovered. Believing Daniel to be hiding something, Rafael tortures Daniel, but Daniel still refuses to divulge anything, so Rafael instead turns his attention to Dr. Lee. At Stargate Command, General Hammond informs O'Neill that there are ransoms for Dr. Jackson and Dr. Lee, and soon-after O'Neill is given the go-ahead to attempt a rescue mission. After O'Neill says goodbye to Sam, she, along with Teal'c, General Hammond, Jacob and Bra'tac hatch a plan to use the stolen Goa'uld cargo ship and armour of the Super Soldier to infiltrate Anubis' base of operations on the planet Tartarus.

In Honduras, O'Neill meets CIA Agent Burke (Enrico Colantoni), a former friend and comrade of O'Neill from his time in black ops. After Burke relays the situation to O'Neill, the pair begin to argue about their past, specifically their last mission together where Burke killed a member of their team in friendly fire and was subsequently discharged from the military. Burke decides to leave O'Neill to complete the current mission on his own. Meanwhile, in the rebel camp, Lee tells Daniel that he gave into their torture and told the revolutionaries everything he knew about the device, which Rafael activates.

Jacob, in the armour of the Super Soldier travels through the Stargate to Tartarus, where upon arrival, is taken by a Goa'uld named Thoth to be examined. Suddenly Anubis (David Palffy) enters and calls Thoth away. With Thoth gone, Jacob is able to deactivate the sensors, allowing Sam, Teal'c and Bra'tac to land in their Cargo Ship. Jacob, Sam & Teal'c then find a Goa'uld queen symbiote, which is being used by Anubis to birth Goa'uld to create more Super Soldiers. They plant explosives on the queen and continue exploring the base until they find a room with thousands of Super Soldiers being addressed by Anubis. Thoth discovers them, but is swiftly killed, which sets off the alarm. The Super Soldiers pursue them, with one of them making it on board the Cargo Ship, but luckily Bra'tac and Jacob are able to eject it.

O'Neill and his guide find Telchak's temple, where Burke is waiting nearby, having changed his mind and decided to help. They then come across Rogelio who is still alive. As O'Neill and Burke continue tracking, Burke reveals that he killed their fellow team-member on their last mission after realising the soldier was a traitor and was about to kill him, but withheld it in order to protect the man's family. In the rebel camp, after learning that Rafael is using the Ancient Device and seeing him kill one of his own men, Dr. Jackson and Dr. Lee manage to escape and flee into the jungle, but are soon chased by Rafael and his men. As the revolutionaries catch up to Jackson and Lee, O'Neill arrives and kills them. A rebel who has been reanimated by the Ancient Device then starts attacking them, but is soon blown-up by Burke.

== Production ==
=== Writing and Development ===
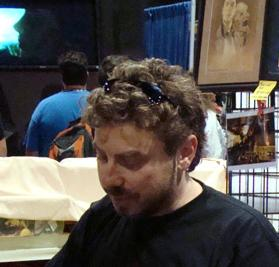
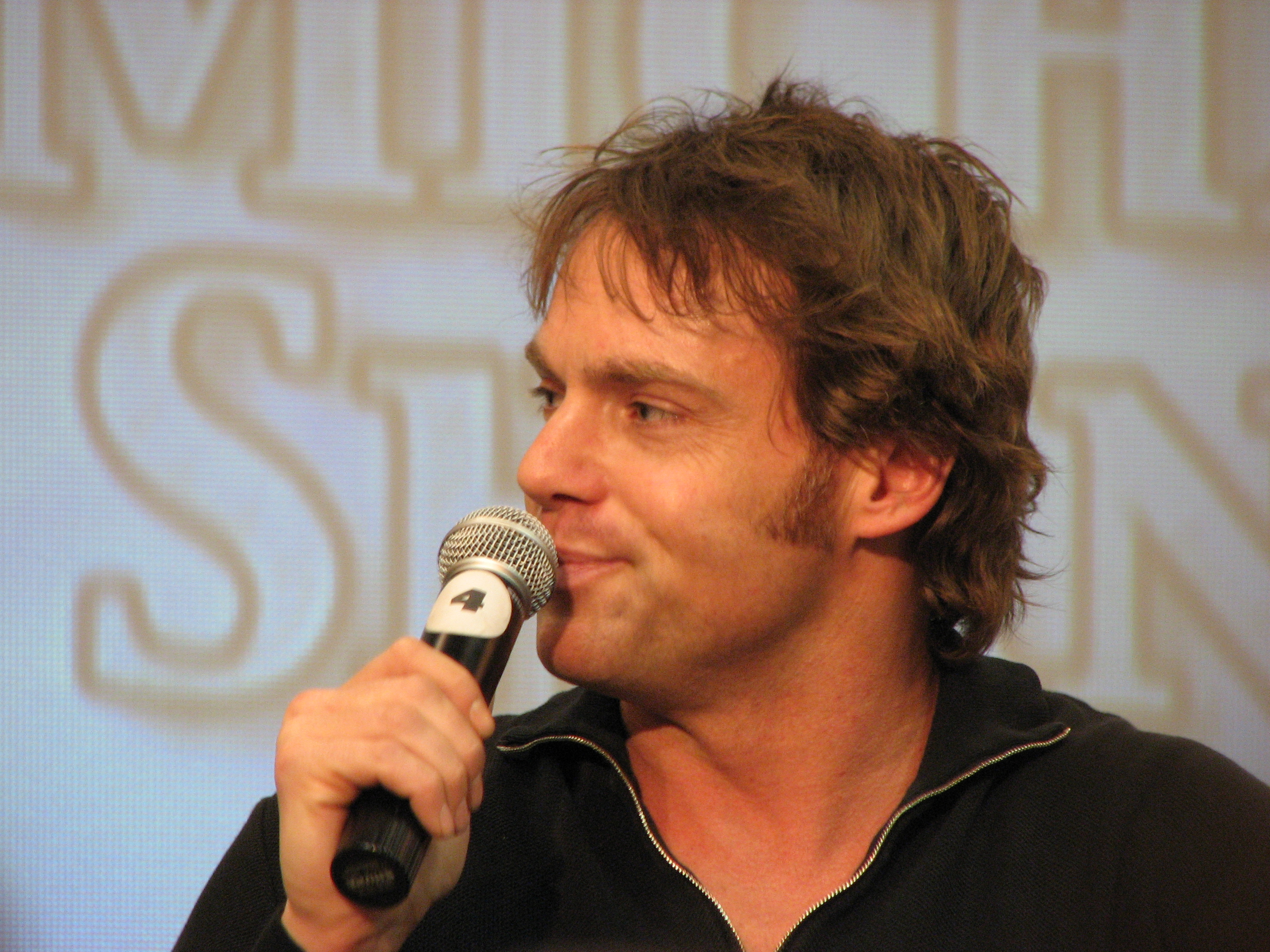
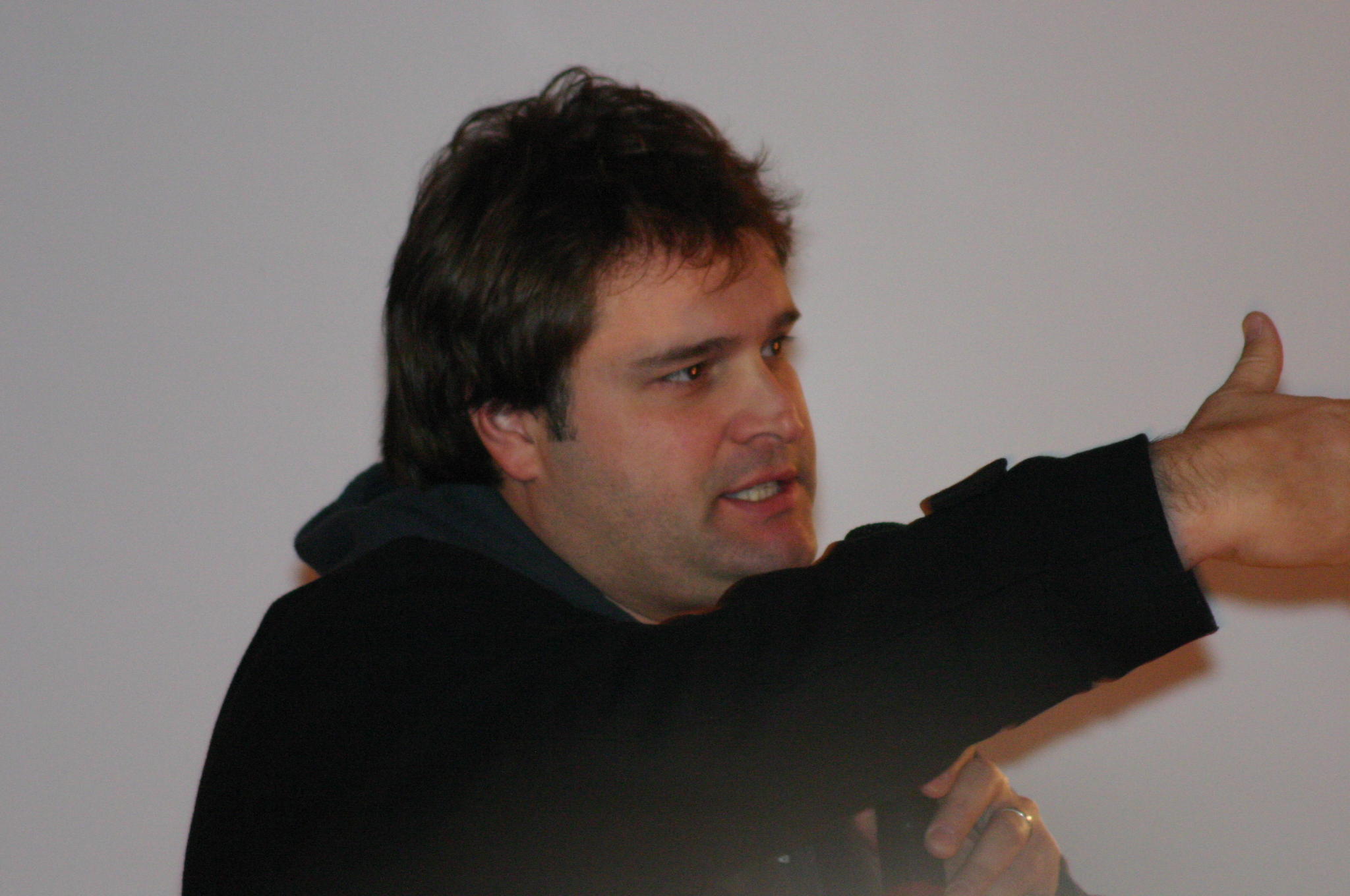
"Evolution" was written by Damian Kindler, Michael Shanks and Peter DeLuise

Part 1 of "Evolution" was written by Damian Kindler and Michael Shanks, with Kindler also handling the teleplay, whilst part 2 was written by Peter Deluise and Kindler, with Deluise also writing the teleplay. Although uncredited, producer Robert C. Cooper also assisted.

Shank's had been working on a number of stories, one of which would have been a sequel to the season 3 episode "Crystal Skull", with Daniel's dying grandfather Nicholas Ballard returning and Daniel subsequently finding his notes on the Fountain of Youth. Robert C. Cooper had been developing his own ideas surrounding the Goa'uld using a device to create a new soldier, which upon Shank's pitching his stories for season 7, Cooper felt that some of their ideas paired well together. Subsequently, Shanks worked with Damian Kindler to further adapt the story into what would become part 1 of "Evolution".

Peter Deluise wrote part 2 of "Evolution" with Kindler. In an earlier draft of part 2, Deluise had O'Neill end the episode with the line "we didn't die this time!", but subsequently removed it as he felt it was too on the nose.

==== Super Soldiers ====
The Super Soldier, also referred to as "Kull Warriors" and "Anubis' Drones" are a Goa'uld foot soldier introduced in "Evolution" that go on to feature throughout the subsequent seasons of SG-1. Over the course of SG-1, the enemy Goa'uld armies, made up of Jaffa soldiers had been slowly defecting and turning against the Goa'uld. Showrunner Robert C. Cooper felt that the Jaffa were no longer imposing, nor enough of a threat as a villain due to how frequently SG-1 successfully defeated them. Due to Jaffa being enslaved by the Goa'uld, Peter Deluise felt it had also become "distasteful" battling them.

Cooper wanted to create a much more powerful adversary than the Jaffa, as well as noting they wanted "one that would relish the challenge of dealing with, and have a little more fun with. We don't mind shooting this guy; he's bad and deserves to be destroyed". Influences from Mary Shelly's Frankenstein's monster and James Cameron's Terminator were noted by Deluise in what they hoped to meld in order to create their new foe. Prior to completing the script for "Evolution", the writers took their ideas to Art Director James Robbins, who worked a conceptualising the look of the villain. Robbin's initially envisioned a soldier more aesthetically similar to the Jaffa warriors, with broad-armour and a staff weapon. Cooper wanted the soldier to be more sleek and high-tech, as well as noting the Ancient influence and so Robbin's redesigned the soldier, opting for a design that features wrist-mounted weapons. Inspired by the episode "Cure", where a Goa'uld symbiote birthed its offspring without passing on its genetic memories, the writers expanded upon this by giving the super soldiers a "blank slate" Goa'uld symbiote that would be responsible for the soldiers physical enhancements. This would be coupled with what was imagined as a reanimated cloned being underneath the armour, created in a laboratory by the Goa'uld Anubis.

As the script for "Evolution" was completed, one of the key considerations for Production Designer Bridget Maguire was creating armour and a being underneath that could be taken apart, piece-by-piece, something Maguire noted the show hadn't done much of before with actual beings. The armour was formed of around 50 different pieces, some of which were vacuum formed, whilst others were hand-moulded from leather and plastic. Maguire and Robbin's had considered having the soldiers skin fuse to the armour as the SGC dissected it, however felt it may end up too gratuitous. Todd Masters and MastersFX worked on the prosthetic face for the creature underneath the armour.

The production team had reoccurring actor Dan Payne in mind for the role, as he had the sort of tall, muscular build they had imagined for the part, as well as being able to handle the sort of physicality that would be involved. A A full body cast of Payne was made so that the suit and armour could be specifically made for his body. Payne, Cooper, DeLuise and John Lenic then spent time developing the way in which the being would move and interact with things, as well as its general demeanour. Payne noted that they the movements to reflect "something that has human elements, robotic elements, is a killer so he has a hunter’s instinct", as well as considering how the soldier would act in battle, commenting they intended for the soldier to come across as "nonchalant" rather than "robotic" when being fired upon. Payne also portrayed Carmen Argenziano's character Jacob Carter during the scenes where Jacob would be wearing the super soldier armour. Multiple super soldiers were featured throughout the episode, most of which were portrayed by Dan Payne, with recurring actor Alex Zahara also portraying the soldiers for additional green screen, motion capture and some pick-up shots.

=== Cast ===
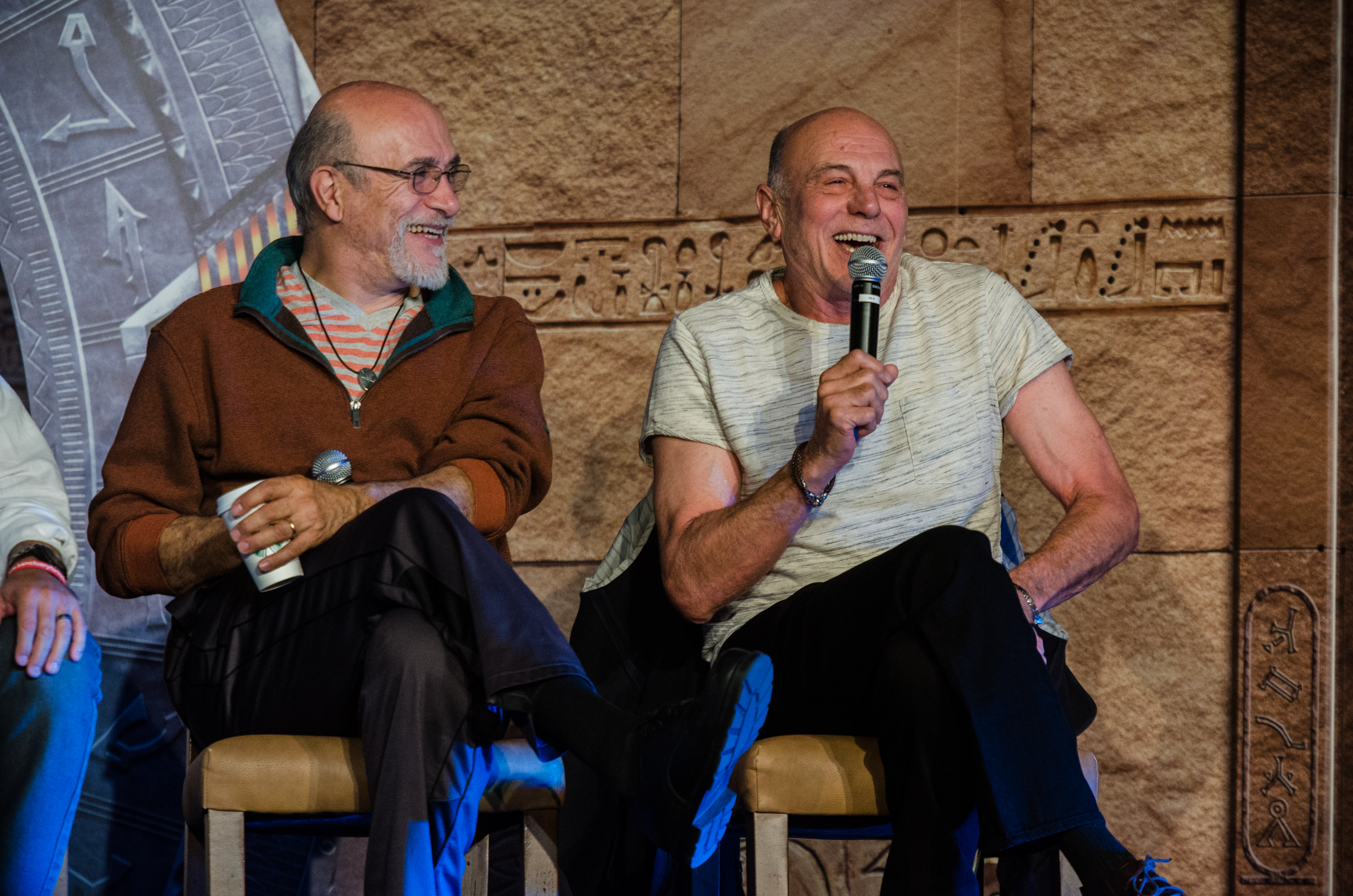
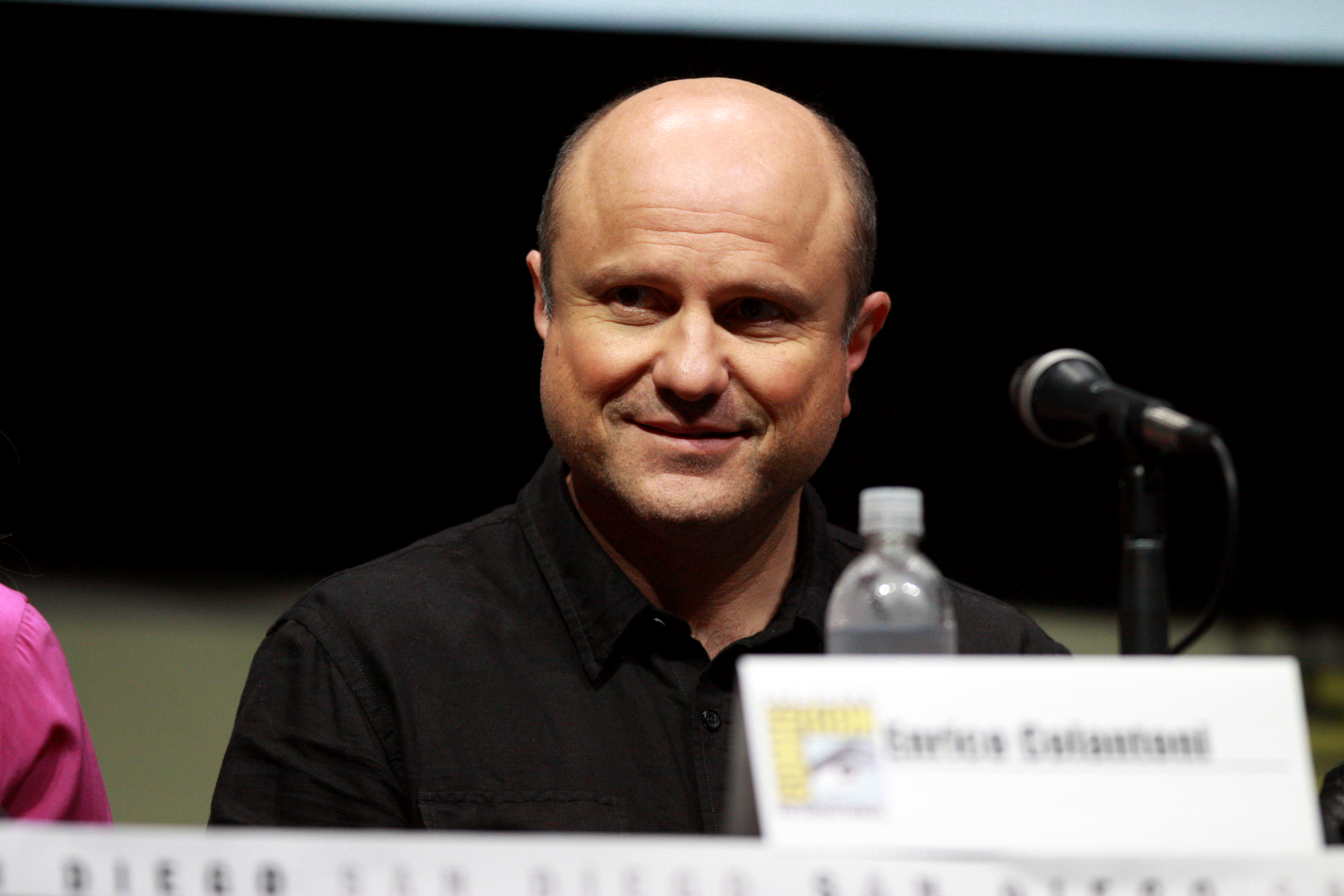
Recurring guest stars Carmen Argenziano and Tony Amendola return as Jacob Carter and Bra'tac, whilst Enrico Colantoni guest stars as Agent Burke.

Enrico Colantoni was cast in the part of CIA agent Burke, a former comrade of O'Neill's time in Black-ops. As the story would delve into an incident from O'Neill's past, Deluise had initially envisioned Burke as quite serious, however as the story progressed Deluise decided to inject more of his own "wacky" mannerisms to add another dimension to the character. Deluise elaborated that "When writing for the character I felt as though I was channelling the spirit of Burke… It was strange and wonderful!". Deluise had hoped to bring Burke back again in a later episode.

Zak Santiago was cast as Honduran guide, Rogelio Duran. Santiago was originally going to die in the first part of "Evolution", with his body to be discovered in the second part, however DeLuise was impressed with Santiago's performance and instead decided the character would survive being shot so as to give Santiago a slightly expanded part. Santiago would later appear as another character, Corporal Rivers in Stargate Universe.

Frank Roman portrayed Honduran revolutionary, Rafael. Roman, who hadn't previously worked with firearms was given training to use both the AK47 and 9mm handgun. Roman found his scenes involving bugs on the set particularly challenging, later commenting that "bugs aren’t my thing and being around them makes me antsy. I had to act in the scene and try not to be freaked out by the bugs around my feet!". Victor Favrin plays one of Rafael's men, Chalo.

Ian Marsh plays the Goa'uld scientist, Thoth. Named after the Ancient Egyptian God of Knowledge, Thoth. Deluise later joked that he named the character that as it was "the only Egyptian God name we hadn't used yet - for good reason", but justified his choice of "terrible" names by saying it fitted the character who was a "Goa'uld nerd".

Recurring guest stars Carmen Argenziano and Tony Amendola return as Jacob Carter and Bra'tac. Eric Breker, Bill Dow, Dan Shea, David Palffy also reprise their characters of Colonel Reynolds, Dr. Lee, Sergeant Siler and Anubis.

=== Filming and Post-production ===
The episode was directed by frequent director Peter Deluise, with Jim Menard overseeing cinematography. Whilst parts of the episode were taking place in Honduras, filming these scenes stayed in British Columbia. Forests outside of Burnaby were redressed with ferns, banana plants and other botany found in South America. Mid-Valley viewpoint served as the location of the rebel camp where Dr. Jackson & Lee were held, with production managing to acquire a downed Russian helicopter to dress the location. A gun range outside of Burnaby was redressed as the Honduran cantina visited by Dr. Lee and Jackson whilst various creatures and animals were also bought into all of these locations, including chickens, donkeys, cockroaches, snakes and a tarantula. A small entrance to the temple was constructed on location that was just big enough to fully submerge the actors, whilst the main temple interior was constructed on a soundstage back at The Bridge Studios.

For the removal of the super-soldiers armour, Deluise was particularly influenced by the television series CSI: Crime Scene Investigation in his choice of shots, whilst later on when Doctor's Jackson & Lee discover the artifact by the temple, Deluise commented that Raiders of the Lost Ark played a major influence on how the scene was written and executed. When greeting the Goa'uld Ramius, Richard Dean Anderson improvised a Vulcan salute from Star Trek.

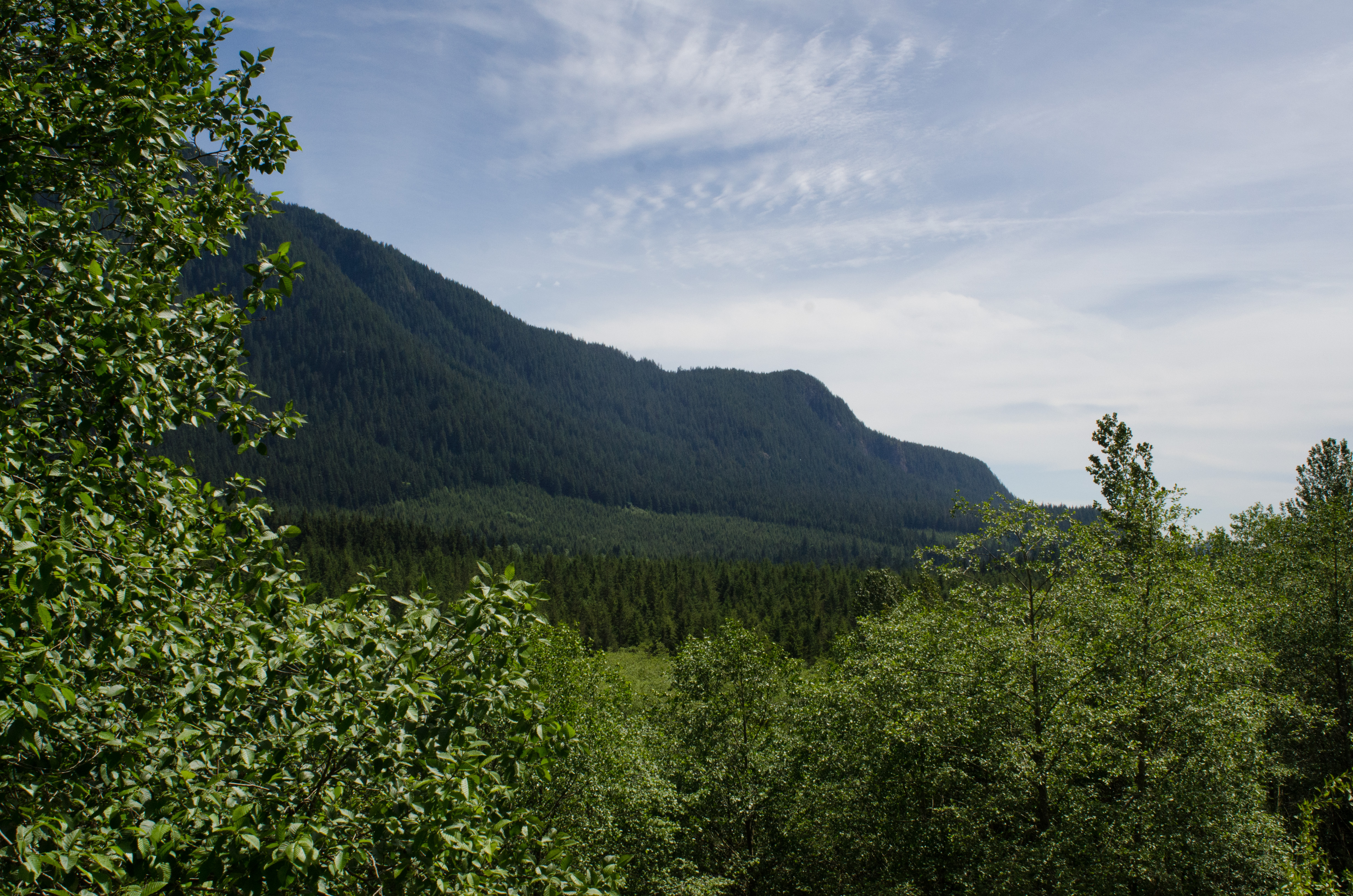
The Honduran rebel camp was filmed around Mid-Valley viewpoint and Lower Seymour Conservation Reserve

The episode was edited by Brad Rines. To further help the scenes in South America feel authentic, the film was graded to look more saturated and warm. Stock footage of a South American waterfall was also added to one of the scenes in Honduras to further sell the audience on the location.

The existing Goa'uld mothership set was redressed to serve as the interior of Anubis' base. Visual effects Bruce Woloshyn supervisor noted that the special effects team used CGI to expand upon the physical sets as well as create the lava-covered alien planet exterior, commenting "we were not only able to expand and show the massive scale of the rest of the interior of the structure, but totally tie the architecture of both the inside and outside of the fortress together in a very stylized design". Visual effects studio Rainmaker Digital Effects had originally assembled previs images which depicted Anubis' Tartarus Outpost as a series of monolithic dome-like structures high-up in a rock mountain, before being reimagined.

== Release and reception ==
As with almost all of season seven, almost all of the key plot points were leaked online in May 2003 and subsequently reposted by various publications. The new enemy, the Goa'uld "Super Soldiers" were teased by various publications in July 2003.

=== Broadcast and ratings ===
"Evolution" part 1 was first broadcast on August 22, 2003, on the Sci-Fi Channel in the United States, with the show then taking a four-month mid-season break. During this break, broadcasts of Stargate SG-1 Season 7 on Sky One in the United Kingdom caught up and overtook those in the US, with part 2 of "Evolution" airing first in the UK on December 14, 2003. "Evolution" part 1 was first shown in the United Kingdom on December 7, 2003, whilst part 2 was first shown in the United States on January 9, 2004.

Upon being broadcast on the Sci-fi Channel, part 1 achieved a 1.7 household rating, whilst "Evolution" part 2 set the record as the highest-rated broadcast ever for the Sci-fi Channel, with a 2.2 household rating, representing around 2.7 million viewers. At the time, this also made it the most watched episode of SG-1's seven and a half year run. On Sky One, part one attracted an estimated 680,000 viewers and was Sky One's sixth most watched show that week, whilst part 2 had some 770,000 viewers, and was the seventh most watched show on Sky One that week.

=== Reception ===
TV Zone editor Jan Vincent-Rudzki was critical of what they called "too many coincidences", referencing Teal'c and Bra'tac's fight with the "indestructible" super-soldier, that happens to show weakness at just the right time and that "Daniel happens to have the information ready to hand about the 'Fountain of Youth'". They went onto discuss the lack of Richard Dean Anderson's Jack O'Neill, noting that O'Neill trying to "talk his way out of jail" was one of the episodes best scenes, going on to remark that "what we're not getting any more is the SG-1 team doing anything as a unit, but rather each of the members involved in separate situations. There's no spark with them separated". Vincent-Rudzki praised the visualization and design of the newly introduced super-soldier, but felt the reactions to it being unmasked were underplayed. Awarding the episode 4/10, the reviewer posed the question "shouldn't a cliff-hanger surprise the audience?". Reviewing for About.com Julia Houston praised the episode for "capitalizing" on previous plot points, writing "the buildup to the big confrontation with Anubis is progressing nicely". Houston also singled out Enrico Colantoni's guest performance as Burke, calling him "extremely likable", as well as highlighting her appreciation of Richard Dean Anderson's increased screen-time as Jack O'Neill in the episode.

Writing for Stargate fansite Gateworld.net, Alli Snow praised the first part of "Evolution" as being "entertaining", but did highlight the unexplained absence of Richard Dean Anderson's Jack O'Neill for the first 20 minutes of the episode. Upon O'Neill's onscreen arrival, Snow felt like the writers "were trying to cram as much "Jackness" as humanly possible into three or four minutes of screen time", which they felt was "a little forced", although nevertheless found it amusing. Snow's review also echoed other reviewers critiques of the episode in that the climax of the first of the two episodes lacked the drama to make it an effective cliff-hanger and build-up the audiences excitement for the second part. Reviewing the second part, Snow felt that too much of the episode was cantered on the character of Burke (Enrico Colantoni), which they found to be superfluous to the plot and was critical of the constant shifting between the different storylines, believing it disrupted the tension. The score by Joel Goldsmith and the setup of the new enemy "super soldiers" were praised by the reviewer as the standout aspects of the episode. Writer and director Peter Deluise described "Evolution" part 2 as his favourite episode to write for on Stargate SG-1, specifically creating the character of Burke. DVD Talk hailed "Evolution" as one of the highlights of SG-1's seventh season. Geek Bomb placed the episode amongst their top 10 episodes from the shows 10-year run.

=== Home media ===
"Evolution", along with prior episodes "Avenger 2.0" and "Birthright" were first released on Region 2 DVD on March 29, 2004, as part of the "Volume 34" standalone disc, before being released as part of the Season 7 boxset on October 19, 2004. Whilst no "SG-1 Directors Series" behind the scenes feature was produced for the episode, audio commentaries of the episode with director Peter Deluise, with actor Gary Jones joining him for part 1 and Amanda Tapping in part 2 were included with the DVD.

The episodes along with the rest of season 7 were first made available digitally in January 2008 through iTunes and Amazon Unbox. The episode, along with every other episode of the series, were made available to stream for the first time through Netflix in the USA on August 15, 2010.
