= Grace (Stargate SG-1) =

- Stargate SG-1 episode
- Episode no.: Season 7 Episode 13
- Directed by: Peter F. Woeste
- Written by: Damian Kindler
- Cinematography by: Jim Menard
- Editing by: Brad Rines
- Production code: P258
- Original air date: January 6, 2004

Guest appearances
- Carmen Argenziano as Jacob Carter/Selmak; Ingrid Kavelaars as Maj. Erin Gant; John Novak as Col. William Ronson; Sasha Pieterse as Grace; Craig Veroni as Weapons Officer

Episode chronology
← Previous "Evolution (Parts 1 & 2)"	Next → "Fallout"

"Grace" is the 13th episode from the seventh season of military science fiction adventure television show Stargate SG-1 and is the 145th overall. It was first broadcast on January 6, 2004, on Sky One in the United Kingdom. The episode was written by Damian Kindler and was directed by Peter F. Woeste.

In the episode, Prometheus is travelling back to Earth when it is attacked by an unknown vessel. During the attack Major Samantha Carter (Amanda Tapping) is knocked unconscious and awakens to find the ships crew are missing and the Prometheus is stuck in a gas cloud.

Actress Amanda Tapping won a Leo Award for her performance in the episode. Sina Oroomchi, David Hibbert, Devan Kraushar and David Cur from the shows sound department were nominated for a Leo Award for their work on the episode.

== Plot ==
The Prometheus is traveling back to Earth using a hyperdrive taken from a Goa'uld Al'kesh. In order to stop the retrofitted hyperdrive from overloading, the ship has been dropping out of hyperspace every few hours to allow the drive to cool down. After dropping out once more, the Prometheus is attacked by an unknown vessel. Unable to use the hyperdrive, Major Samantha Carter (Amanda Tapping) suggests they retreat into a gas cloud with the hope it will make it more difficult for the alien vessel to track them. As the alien vessel continues their attack, Carter is knocked unconscious.

When Carter wakes up, she finds herself alone on board the Prometheus, with the entire crew missing. Suffering from head injury, Carter struggles to stay conscious and soon begins having visions of a little girl (Sasha Pieterse) running around the ship blowing bubbles. Unable to restart the engines the ship is stuck in the cloud. Teal'c (Christopher Judge) appears, warning her that she must not fall asleep, however she is unable to resist. After seeing the little girl once more, she then starts seeing Daniel Jackson (Michael Shanks) and in talking to him believes that she's hallucinating and that he's a figment her subconscious mind. As the ships hull begins to corrode and her concussion worsens, Carter continues to imagine Daniel who wants her to study the gas cloud and believes the gas cloud is a sentient being, whilst Teal'c warns her that she may have in fact been captured by the aliens. She imagines her father, Jacob Carter (Carmen Argenziano) who questions her life choices and whether or not she's happy. As Carter gives up on finding a solution to leave the cloud, she conjures up the image of Jack O'Neill (Richard Dean Anderson) and confronts him about her feelings.

The small girl continues to blow bubbles, giving Carter the idea to partially engage the hyperdrive and take Prometheus out of the cloud's space-time. She contacts the alien ship, offering her solution to escape the gas cloud in exchange for return of the crew and safe passage. The crew are returned and Carter creates a bubble around both ships and they both exit the cloud.

== Production ==
=== Development and writing ===
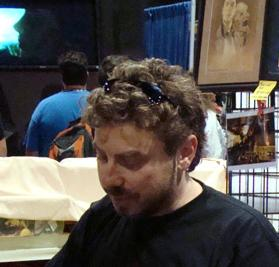
The episode was written by Damian Kindler.

The episode was written by Damian Kindler. It was originally titled "Crossfire", before being titled "Passengers" and then finally "Grace". At the start of pre-production on season seven actress Amanda Tapping and showrunner Robert C. Cooper had a conversation regarding the direction to take Samantha Carter in the upcoming season. Tapping asked Cooper for an episode where Carter would "struggle with her demons" and would question her "life choices and questions what she's missing, you know, as a woman and as a contributing member of society". Cooper told Tapping they had already begun developing something in that vein, commenting that he tended to rely upon Carter's voice for technobabble and exposition admitting "we sometimes lose track of the fact that she's also a woman, who has a life, and we wanted to explore that too".

The episode continued what Kindler described as a "kind of a mini agenda coming into season seven" where he "really wanted to write some good Carter stories". Kindler had two initial ideas which formed the basis of the episode. The first idea came to Kindler in a dream, in which he imagined "Carter trapped on a planet in a decaying orbit" and "having to deal with this very personal and emotional gauntlet if she hopes to survive". Kindler also had the idea "of the team encountering a faceless alien threat" and showrunner Robert C. Cooper believed both ideas could marry together for an episode. Kindler described the story as a "closed-door mystery" where "You never really find out what happened in the epic sense", intending that the episode remain focused around Carter.

During the story, a stranded and alone Carter would become concussed. In Carter's fight to survive, Kindler wanted the character to "address some very heavy issues in her life in order to find a reason to keep going", one of the key issues being "her feelings for O'Neill and the hopelessness" she felt regarding their situation. Kindler described wanting to address but not conclude "what that has been doing to her for seven years", whilst also expressing his desire to "stir the pot" of the fans who ship Carter & O'Neill romantically. This would then setup Cooper & Kindler's upcoming episode "Chimera" which would see Carter enter a relationship with a new character. According to writer and co-executive producer Joseph Mallozzi in the early outline of the story Carter would have boarded the alien vessel and come "face to face with its crew", however it was ultimately decided the story "would work better as a self-contained narrative".

=== Cast and filming ===
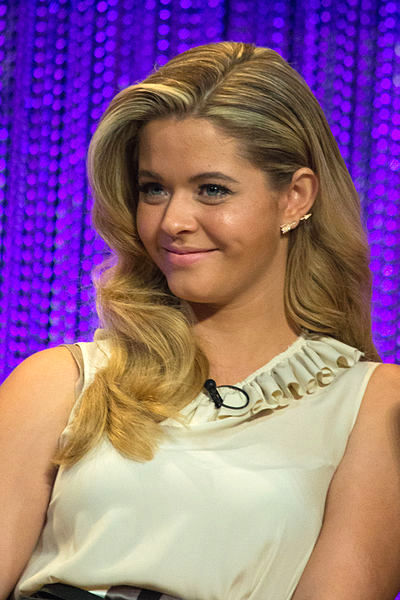
Sasha Pieterse (pictured in 2014 at age 18) guest starred as Grace (at age 7).

Sasha Pieterse guest stars as the titular character, Grace. Tapping believed who or what the character was purposely left open for interpretation, however she personally Grace as "Sam's child if she had chosen family over career" as well as "the potential future for Carter". Tapping also believed the child could be seen as being emblematic of "Carter's inner child, the child that she doesn't play with" and "a representation of what Carter's capable of". Carmen Argenziano reprises his role as Jacob Carter/Selmak. John Novak and Ingrid Kavelaars reprise their roles of Major Erin Gant and Colonel William Ronson from the episode "Memento". Craig Veroni appears as Weapons Officer. Veroni was subsequently cast the following year as Peter Grodin who was a recurring character during the first season of Stargate Atlantis.

The episode was directed by Peter F. Woeste, with cinematography by Jim Menard. Tapping recorded her voice-over dialog before filming the episode began. The episode was predominantly shot by the shows second unit whilst the shows main unit worked on the episodes Death Knell" and "Chimera". According to Tapping, although the official schedule was for two days of main unit photography and six days of second unit, filming took over a month to complete. Tapping had hoped to use the summer filming hiatus to "map out" her arc and beats within the episode, particularly regarding the effects of her head-injury, however filming ended up starting on the final day of production before the hiatus.

In being concussed and hallucinating, Tapping was mindful of "not going over the top" with her performance, and looked to try and perform her scenes "very softly". According to Tapping Richard Dean Anderson, Christopher Judge and Michael Shanks all played "somewhat different" versions of their characters; Jack O'Neill, Teal'c and Daniel Jackson in Carters hallucinations. In filming the scenes where Carter is concussed and alone onboard Prometheus, Woeste wanted to keep the audience "a little off balance" and shot the scenes with wider lenses on order to "show as much of the set" and to show Carter "somewhat diminutive in that set, just to give it that feeling she's alone and that there's no one else around her". Dutch camera angles and camera rotation were also used with Menard hoping that the audience would be unsure whether "it was a dream or not". Using Dutch angles in the hallways of the Prometheus set meant that the studio ceiling would be visible, therefore the set ceilings had to be filled in.

== Reception ==
=== Broadcast and ratings ===
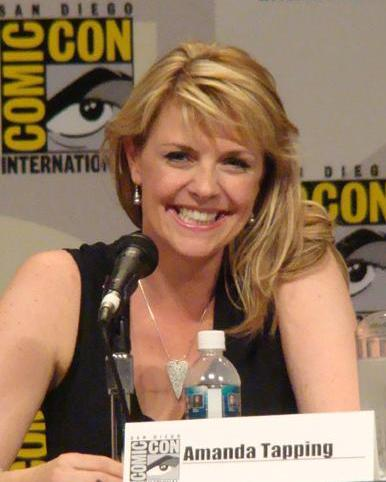
Amanda Tapping won a Leo Award for "Dramatic Series: Best Lead Performance - Female" for her performance as Samantha Carter in the episode.

"Grace" was first broadcast on January 6, 2004 on Sky One in the United Kingdom. It was then shown for the first time in the United States on January 16, 2004 on Sci Fi, earning a Nielsen rating of 1.8. This was down on the channel's record breaking 2.2 household rating for the previous week's episode "Evolution", but remained above the season average of 1.7. In Canada the episode was first shown on December 2, 2004 on SPACE. The episode was first syndicated in the United States during the week of January 17, 2005 and achieved a 2.5 household rating, equating to approximately 2.7 million viewers which made it the most watched episode of season seven to-date.

=== Reception and awards ===
Reviewing for SFX Jayne Dearsley awarded the episode five out of five stars, praising Tapping's "pitch-perfect performance". Dearsley believed the episode delivered "some genuine, creepy chills, a good dollop of emotion and some lovely effects" and called the use of hallucinations "refreshing", writing "Carter's visions could've been explained away as some sort of technobabble-heavy anomaly, but, happily, they're not supernatural at all; just side effects of the bang on her bonce". Reviewing for TV Zone Jan Vincent-Rudzki called it "Not a great episode, but well executed" and compared the premise to Star Trek, awarding the episode 7 out of 10. Reviewing for fansite Gateworld, Ali Snow awarded the episode three and a half stars, hailing Tapping for carrying the episode, calling her performance "brilliant". Snow also praised how Kindler appeared to flirt with Star Trek tropes such as "sentient space anomaly" and "alien mind trick" "then veers back into an original and satisfying story". James Hoare for The Companion believed "When we think of Sam at her finest, it's episodes like ‘Grace’ that immediately offer themselves up as evidence" Reviewing for Sci-Fi Online, Darren Rea felt the episode was "a bit of a sci-fi cliché", awarding it 6 out of 10.

Amanda Tapping won a Leo Award in the category "Dramatic Series: Best Lead Performance - Female" for her performance as Samantha Carter in the episode. Sina Oroomchi, David Hibbert, Devan Kraushar and David Cur were nominated for a Leo Award in "Best Overall Sound in a Dramatic Series", losing to The Collector episode "The Rapper".

=== Home media ===
"Grace" along with the episodes "Chimera", "Fallout" and "Death Knell" were first released on Region 2 DVD on May 3, 2004 as part of the "Volume 35" standalone disc, before being released as part of the Season 7 boxset on October 19, 2004. The episodes audio commentary is provided by director Peter Woeste, director of photography Jim Menard, camera operator Will Waring and set decorator Mark Davidson. "Grace" along with the rest of season 7 was first made available digitally in January 2008 through iTunes and Amazon Unbox. The episode, along with every other episode of the series, were made available to stream for the first time through Netflix in the USA on August 15, 2010. The episode, along with the rest of the series has been upscaled for releases on various streaming platforms and the 2020 Blu-ray release.
