= Anna-Louise Plowman =

New Zealand actress (born 1972)

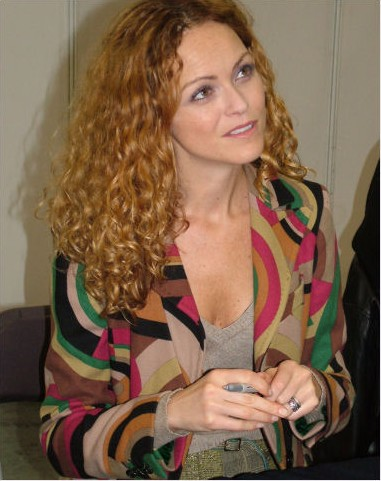
- Plowman in 2005
- Born: 9 May 1972 (age 54); Napier, New Zealand
- Occupation: Actress
- Years active: 1995–present
- Spouse: Toby Stephens (m. 2001)
- Children: 3

Anna-Louise Plowman (born 9 May 1972) is a New Zealand-born actress.

== Early life and education ==
Plowman was born in New Zealand to British parents. She attended Samuel Marsden Collegiate School, Wellington, between 1982 and 1989, and then the London Academy of Music and Dramatic Art and the Lecoq School in Paris.

== Career ==
She played consultant anaesthetist Annalese Carson in Holby City and Sarah Gardner/Osiris in Stargate SG-1. In 2003 she played Melinda MacLean, wife of British communist spy Donald Maclean, and mistress of spy Kim Philby (played by her husband Toby Stephens), in the TV mini-series Cambridge Spies.

She played Diana Goddard in the Doctor Who story "Dalek" in 2005. Plowman also played the role of "C" in a revival of Edward Albee's play, Three Tall Women, in 2006, at the Oxford Playhouse.

Plowman and Stephens performed together as Sibyl and Elyot in Jonathan Kent's revival of Private Lives for the 2012 Chichester Festival, reprised at the Gielgud Theatre in 2013.

From 2016 to 2017, she played chamber maid Mrs Hudson in the series Black Sails, which also starred her husband Toby Stephens.

== Personal life ==
Plowman married actor Toby Stephens, son of actors Maggie Smith and Robert Stephens, in London, in 2001. In 2007, Plowman and Stephens had their first child. British playwright Simon Gray, who wrote Japes, a stage play, and Missing Dates, a radio drama, both of which starred Stephens, was the child's godfather. Their daughters were born in 2009 and in 2010, respectively.

== Filmography ==
Year	Title	Role	Notes
1997	FairyTale: A True Story	Shellycoat	
2000	The Adulterer	Gabriella	
2000	Flick	Pop's woman	
2000–2004	Stargate SG-1	Dr. Sarah Gardner / Osiris	Episodes: The Curse, Summit, Last Stand, Revelations, Chimera
2002	Ultimate Force	Marisol	episode: Just a target
2003	The Foreigner	Meredith Van Aken	
2003	Shanghai Knights	Debutante	
2003	Cambridge Spies	Melinda Maclean	TV miniseries
2004	He Knew He Was Right	Caroline Spalding	TV miniseries
2004	My Life in Film	Charlie	Episode: "Top Gun"
2005	Doctor Who	Diana Goddard	Dalek
2005	Days of Darkness	Lisa	TV movie
2006	These Foolish Things	Aggie	
2006	Agatha Christie's Marple	Helen Marsden	Sleeping Murder
2006	Ultimate Force	Braun	episode: slow bomb
2008–2010, 2012	Holby City	Dr. Annalese Carson-Spence	
2010	New Tricks	Alison Levene	Fashion Victim
2012	Six Bullets	Monica Fayden	
2015	Father Brown	Rebecca Himelbaum	The Judgment of Man
2015	The Eichmann Show	Jane Hurwitz	
2016	Billionaire Ransom	Emily Tilton Scofield	
2016–2017	Black Sails	Mrs. Hudson	
2019	The Witcher	Zola	
