= 200 (Stargate SG-1) =

- Stargate SG-1 episode
- Episode no.: Season 10; Episode 6
- Directed by: Martin Wood
- Written by: Brad Wright; Robert C. Cooper; Joseph Mallozzi; Paul Mullie; Carl Binder; Martin Gero; Alan McCullough
- Production code: 1006
- Original air date: August 18, 2006

Guest appearances
- Richard Dean Anderson as Jack O'Neill; Willie Garson as Martin Lloyd; Gary Jones as Walter Harriman; Don S. Davis as George Hammond; Cory Monteith as young Cameron Mitchell

Episode chronology
← Previous "Uninvited"	Next → "Counterstrike"
- Stargate SG-1 season 10

"200" is the sixth episode of the tenth season of the science fiction television series Stargate SG-1 and the 200th episode of the series overall. Unlike the more serious nature of the season's story arc, "200" is a light-hearted parody of both Stargate SG-1 and other sci-fi shows, as well as popular culture like The Wizard of Oz.

"200" won the 2007 Constellation Award for Best Overall 2006 Science Fiction Film or Television Script and was nominated for the 2007 Hugo Award for Best Dramatic Presentation, Short Form. The episode also marks the first time original SG-1 member Jack O'Neill (Richard Dean Anderson) appears since the beginning of Season 9.

The episode received a 1.9 average household rating, one of the few episodes of the season that surpassed the average rating of Stargate SG-1's previous season. "200" also received praise for its humor and writing. Despite the strong performance of the episode, the Sci-Fi Channel announced soon after the episode's airing it would not be renewing the series for another season.

== Plot ==
Martin Lloyd (Willie Garson), an extraterrestrial turned Hollywood writer, returns to Stargate Command looking for assistance from SG-1 with his script for the movie adaptation of the television show Wormhole X-Treme, based on the exploits of the Stargate Program. The team, especially Lt. Colonel Mitchell (Ben Browder), is reluctant to help. Mitchell is excited about his next off-world mission because it marks his 200th trip through the Stargate. Technical glitches prevent the team from setting off on their mission. General Landry (Beau Bridges) orders SG-1 to help Lloyd, as the government believes a successful science fiction film about intergalactic wormhole travel will serve as a good cover story to keep the real Stargate program a secret.

The notes session devolves into the team members pitching their own versions of a successful sci-fi film, including a zombie invasion (from Mitchell), a previously unseen mission where O'Neill became invisible (from Carter), "tributes" to The Wizard of Oz and Farscape from Vala, and Teal'c as a private investigator (from Teal'c himself). Also featured are a vignette of the team's mental image of a "younger and edgier" SG-1 (sparked by the studio's suggestion to replace the original Wormhole X-Treme cast), a suggested scene by Martin that turns out to be both scientifically inaccurate and highly derivative of Star Trek, a re-imagined version of the SG-1 pilot episode where all the characters are marionettes in the style of the television series Thunderbirds, and an imagined wedding that features the return of General O'Neill (Richard Dean Anderson). The studio decides to cancel the movie in favor of renewing the series. The end of the episode shifts ten years into the future, where the Wormhole X-Treme cast and crew celebrate their 200th episode, as well as renewed plans for a movie.

== Cultural references ==
Most of the episode is devoted to references and allusions to other works, as well as the show itself. The title sequence is deliberately shorter than most other episodes, poking fun at shows like Lost as well as the Sci-Fi Channel itself, which had shortened SG-1's Season 9 opening but changed it back after fans demanded it. When Martin learns that his main actor has backed out of the movie, the SG-1 team offers various suggestions for how to replace him or work around his non-availability—a reference to Michael Shanks's absence from the sixth season of Stargate SG-1. Anderson references the ending of the eighth-season episode "Moebius", which was intended to be the series finale of SG-1 before the ninth season was announced. The final scene of "200", which features interviews with the Wormhole X-Treme cast, was added as an afterthought, and contains comments from the real cast used out of context as an inside joke. Actor Michael Shanks felt the interviews "cross the line between polite parody and absolute scathing commentary" of the cast, creators, and fans.

The episode also riffs on other science fiction shows. Early in the episode, Dr. Jackson asks why anyone would make a movie version of a TV series that lasted only three episodes—Teal'c responds that it had strong DVD sales. This is a reference to the series Firefly, which Fox executives decided to cancel after airing only three episodes. The high number of DVDs of these episodes that sold afterwards justified making a feature film based on the series, Serenity. Firefly is again referenced when Lloyd refuses to use footage from the Wormhole X-Treme series for the movie, saying that "it's a movie, not a clip show," alluding to a similar comment from Firefly show runner Joss Whedon. Another sequence is a parody of the original Star Trek series, with SG-1 standing in for the crew of the Starship Enterprise. Brad Wright, the co-creator of the series, fills in as the engineer Montgomery Scott. Another sequence makes fun of the series Farscape, including its habit of inventing swear words. Stargate: SG-1 actors Ben Browder and Claudia Black had both starred in the earlier series. Several other shows and movies are parodied, including The Wizard of Oz, with the story re-told with the members of the SG-1 team as the adventurers in Oz. The writers based the parody on a fan painting they had hanging in their office. The episode also makes fun of 24's "ticking clock of jeopardy", and an entire sequence is enacted with all the characters played by marionettes, in the style of Thunderbirds and Team America: World Police.

== Production ==
"200" follows up on the events of the Season 4 episode "Point of No Return" and the Season 5 episode "Wormhole X-Treme"; the episodes feature the character of Martin and are self-referentially written. In comparison, "200" riffs on science fiction and genre television more broadly. In comparison to attitudes that fans are largely powerless and in opposition to producers, the episode posits fans as empowered shapers of entertainment.

Executive producer Robert C. Cooper originally intended the 200th episode to be regular episode, with the celebration happening behind the scenes. When deciding which writer would pen the episode, Cooper realized it could be a group effort instead. "We had always kicked around little ideas in the writers' room," Cooper explained. "Everybody would pitch stupid things that would never make it into a normal episode just because it was funny [...] so I thought, 'Well, why not do those things?'" Cooper took inspiration from the sketch comedy process of Saturday Night Live and the vignette structure of The Simpsons's Treehouse of Horror episodes. The episode took shape when the writers thought to bring back Wormhole X-Treme and the character of Martin, and frame the whole episode as a notes session. By making the outlandish scenes parts of the script the Lloyd character had written, it allowed the episode to still exist in the regular continuity of the show.

The episode was conceived as a love letter to fans, including references and ribbing of some of the show's elements and tropes. Stargate producers were not sure actor Richard Dean Anderson would return for the episode, so they devised many scenes where Anderson was technically in the episode but not actually shown. Anderson was ultimately willing to return and appeared in several scenes. Cooper said, "it was a big deal for us to have [him] back for the 200th episode. We obviously didn't think we could do it without him." Cooper and series co-creator Brad Wright stated that there was a fine line between the humor of regular episodes turning into camp. While jokes for the joke's sake are usually limited in normal episodes, the line between humor and camp was deliberately crossed frequently in "200". The producers talked about recreating a part of Blazing Saddles that breaks the fourth wall, but they could not afford the horses.

"200" took no longer to shoot than a normal episode, mainly because much of the filming took place on the same briefing room set; the episode was however markedly more expensive than a typical one, due to the unusual sequences. The marionettes were created by the Chiodo brothers, who also made the puppets for Team America: World Police; each puppet was expensive, and the wires pulling each puppet had to be re-added by computer-generated imagery in postproduction because they did not show up well enough on camera. Several existing sets were used as stand-ins; for example, the bridge of the Odyssey was used for the Star Trek spoof, while a set from the sister production Stargate Atlantis was used as the chamber of the Wizard of Oz. The cast members recalled the episode being one of the most fun to shoot, with everyone in the crew going above and beyond to make the episode special.

The producers made sure that the episode was well-publicized, dropping hints that Anderson's character O'Neill would return for the episode. Joe Mallozzi, executive producer for the series, also hinted that series fans would finally meet the Furlings, an enigmatic race referenced in the second-season episode "The Fifth Race" but never seen. Many of the writers' favorite moments did not make it to production due to time constraints, including a Gilligan's Island skit.

== Reception ==
The episode won the 2007 Constellation Award for Best Overall 2006 Science Fiction Film or Television Script, and was nominated for the 2007 Hugo Award for Best Dramatic Presentation, Short Form. Richard Dean Anderson also won a SyFy Genre Award for his guest appearance in the episode.

The episode was generally well received. IGN declared the episode "one of the smartest and funniest hours of television to grace the small screen yet this season." They went on to applaud the decision not only to parody other works but the show itself. Maureen Ryan of the Chicago Tribune agreed, but also noted that "you don't need to be a longtime fan of the long-running program to enjoy its jibes at sci-fi clichés or expedient writing." Eclipse Magazine noted that although the episode was "not a work of comic genius", "200" was the best comedy episode of the series.

The highly publicized debut of the episode garnered a 1.9 average household rating, a 36% jump from the previous episode, and the first episode of the tenth season to reach or exceed the previous season's rating of 1.8; Stargate SG-1 at that point was averaging about 3.3 million viewers per regular episode in the United States.

Shortly after "200" aired, Stargate web site Gateworld announced that the Sci-Fi Channel had decided to not renew Stargate SG-1 for the coming year. Sci-Fi confirmed this decision, at the same time announcing that Stargate Atlantis had been picked up for another season. Many fans denounced Gateworld's cancellation announcement, both the timing of it (made while the cast and crew were celebrating the episode's airing)—and the decision itself, as the series was still drawing an audience of a respectable size. Sci Fi responded that the cancellation decision had not been based on ratings so much as a feeling the series had run its course. Some of the main characters in SG-1 re-appear later in episodes of Atlantis and Universe and in the direct-to-DVD sequel films, Stargate: The Ark of Truth and Stargate: Continuum.
