= Dan Shea (actor) =

Canadian actor and stuntman

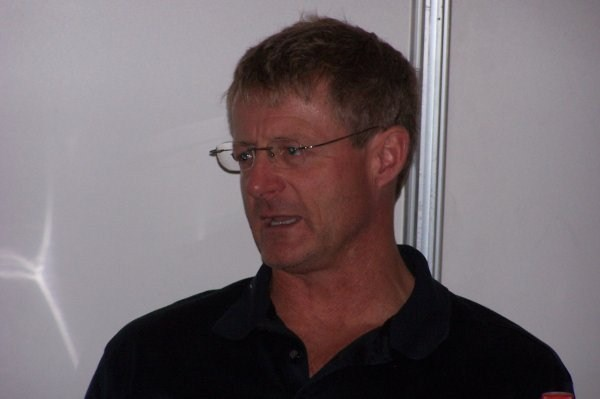
- Born: December 23, 1954 (age 71); Ontario, Canada
- Occupations: Actor; stunt coordinator; stunt performer
- Children: 2

Daniel Joseph Shea (born December 23, 1954) is a Canadian actor and stunt coordinator who is best known for his recurring role as Sgt. Siler on Stargate SG-1 and Stargate Atlantis.

== Education ==
Shea attended the University of Waterloo (Ontario), studying kinesiology and playing hockey until his athletic career was derailed by an eye injury. Anatomy, biomechanics, and a deep understanding of the body’s physical capabilities has come in handy for Shea who has been living and working as a stunt performer in Vancouver for nearly 25 years. After an eye injury curbed his dreams of the National Hockey League, he headed west with vague notions of Hollywood and in need of income. "I crashed a beer commercial audition and two days later I was in Hawaii blasting around on jets skis in shark infested waters making more money than I ever dreamed possible."

== Career ==
Shea was the stunt coordinator and Richard Dean Anderson's stunt double on Stargate SG-1. He previously served as Anderson's stand-in on MacGyver. He has appeared in episodes of three different series with Richard Dean Anderson: MacGyver, Stargate SG-1 and Stargate Atlantis. In "Tin Man", a season 1 episode of Stargate SG-1, he appeared as Colonel Jack O'Neill's (Richard Dean Anderson's character) 'clone'.

He has been credited in all 214 episodes of Stargate SG-1 as either an actor, stunt double or stunt coordinator.

Dan was the stunt coordinator on the movie X-Men: The Last Stand and the show Psych.

He appeared as the zombified Father Buckner in the 2012 horror film The Cabin in the Woods.

== Personal life ==
Shea was born in Ontario. He has 2 daughters. He was a College Hockey player but suffered an eye injury which ended his sports career.

== Filmography ==
- Psych - stunt coordinator (2006–2014)
- Stargate SG-1 - actor, stunt double, stunt coordinator (1997–2007)
- Stargate Atlantis - actor, stunt performer, stunt double (2004–2007)
- The Cabin in the Woods - "Father Buckner"
- X-Men: Days of Future Past - Policeman (Uncredited)
