= Stargate fandom =

Fan following surrounding the Stargate series

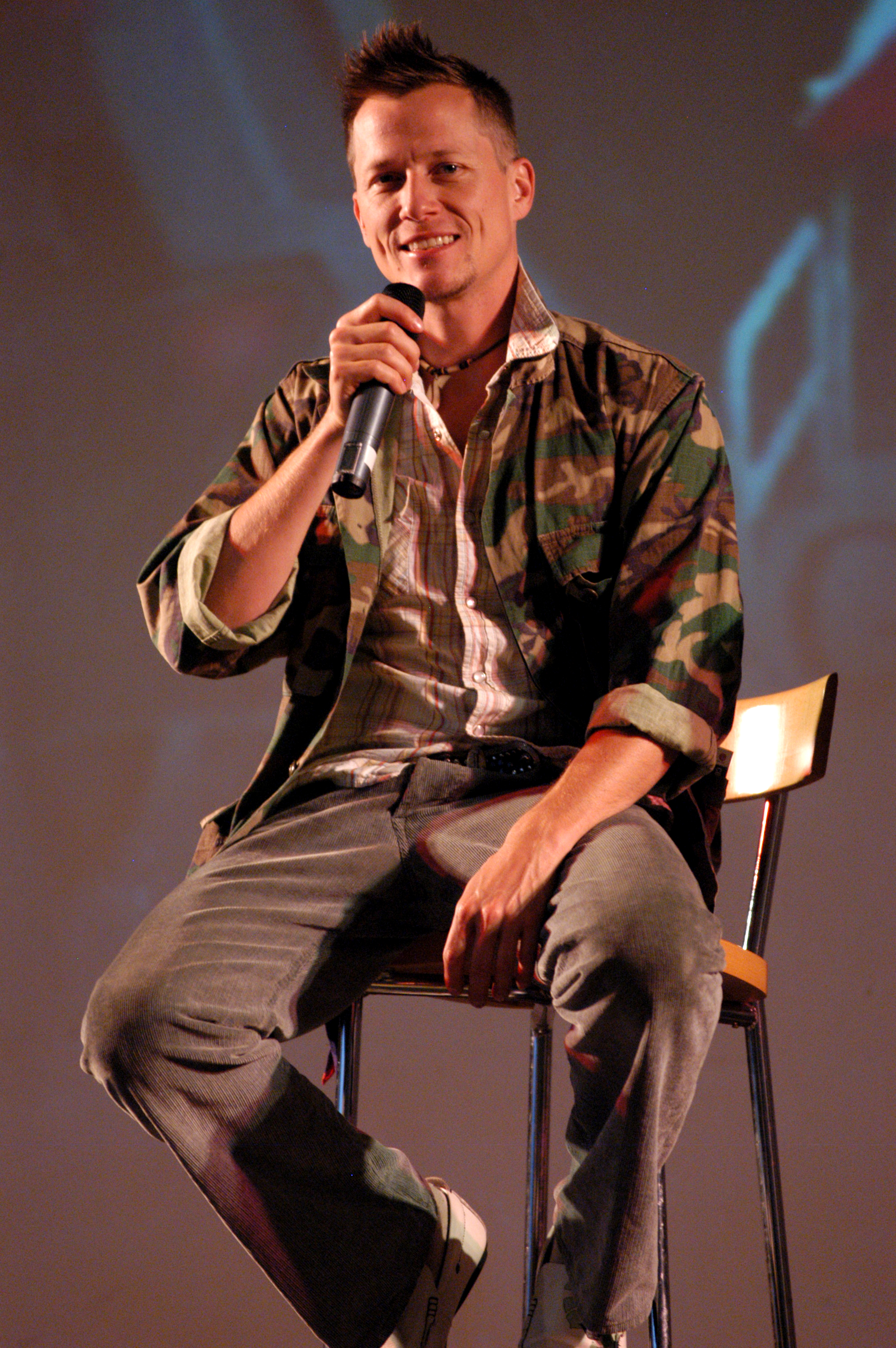
Corin Nemec at Gatecon in 2006

The Stargate fandom is the community of fans of the military science fiction film Stargate and its spinoff television and web series including Stargate SG-1 (SG1), Stargate Infinity (SGI), Stargate Atlantis (SGA), and Stargate Universe (SGU).

== Fandom ==
While panned by critics, the 1994 film Stargate drew much attention, grossing close to 200 million USD. The film was praised for its special effects and eventually gathered its own cult following over the years. The follow-up Stargate television franchise built a solid fanbase, which has been known for its loyal fans. Stargate SG-1 has established many of its own conventions, such as Wolfcon in Europe, Gatecon in Canada, among others. The franchise contains many unofficial conventions such as MediaWest Con and Vividcon established and run by fans of the franchise. Since its early years, Stargate has grown in popularity in Great Britain, France, and Germany among other European countries. The American-written book, Reading Stargate SG-1 noted that the franchise was strong with female fans because of its feminist approach to certain characters, most notably Samantha Carter (portrayed by Amanda Tapping).

=== Gaters ===
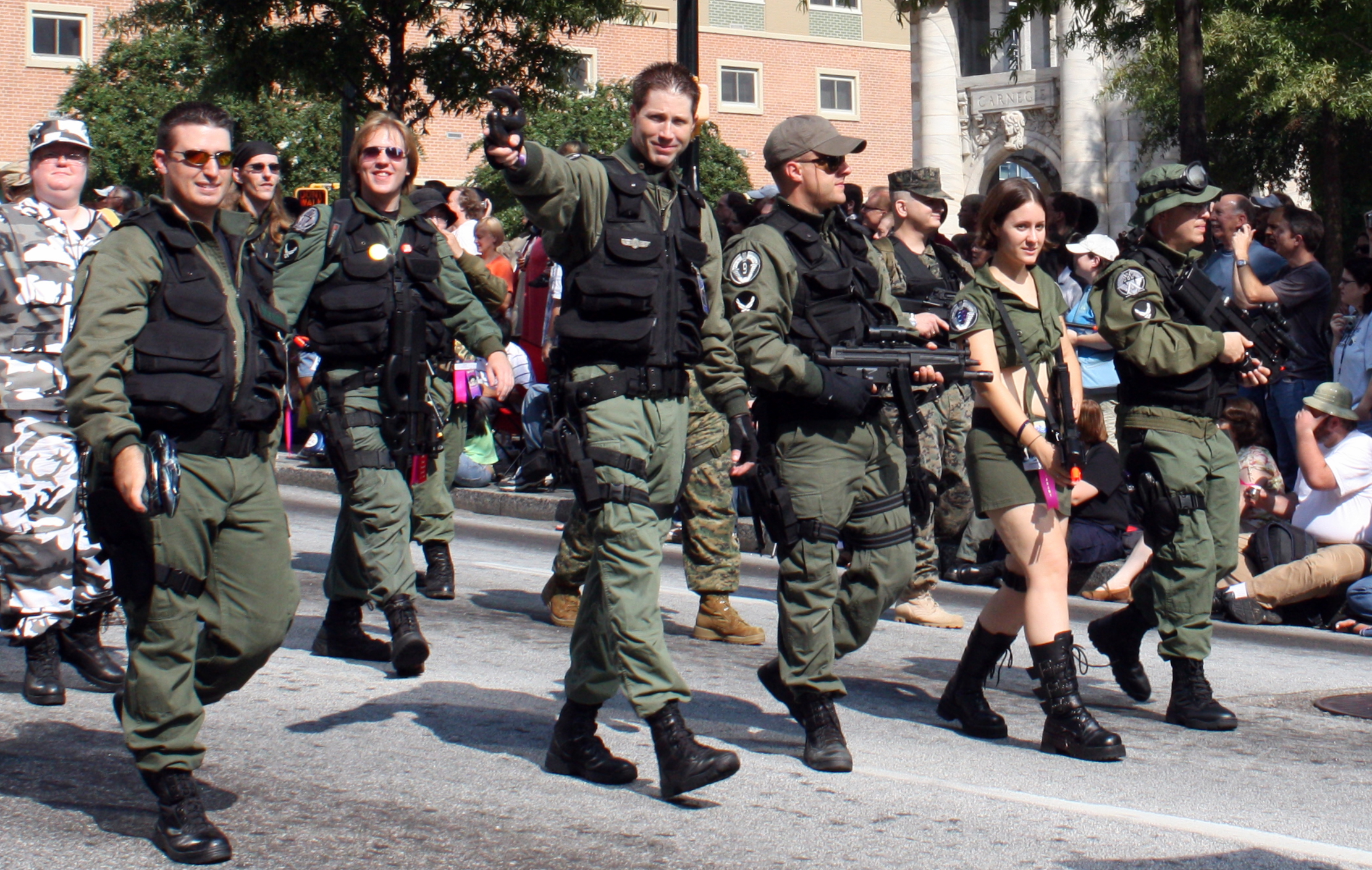
Fans posing as SG teams at Dragon Con in 2008

Brad Wright used the term "Gaters" to refer to fans of Stargate SG-1 in 2001, but the term was never fully adopted. Some fans believe that there was a real Stargate device under Cheyenne Mountain that inspired writers Joseph Mallozzi and Paul Mullie to come up with their own conspiracy story for season 4's "Point of No Return". The fansite GateWorld became a major franchise news site with special arrangements with MGM; GateWorld's founder Darren Sumner was later hired to serve as a news editor for the official Stargate SG-1 magazine and to check Stargate comic books for continuity errors with the TV shows before publication. Late Night with Conan O'Brien graphic designer Pierre Bernard gained notoriety among Stargate fans for devoting several of his "Recliner of Rage" Late Night segments to SG-1. The producers invited him to make cameo appearances in the episodes "Zero Hour" and "200".

=== Gatecon ===
Gatecon is an annual fan convention which centers around the Stargate television franchise. Gatecon was conceived in 2000 to provide a place for fans of the show Stargate SG-1 to meet members of the cast and crew, and to get to know their fellow fans. The original organizers met due to an interactive Stargate-themed site run by Ryan Peters under Showtime's umbrella. Since its inception, Gatecon has raised money for the Make-a-Wish Foundation through a series of auction evenings. Metro–Goldwyn–Mayer (MGM) and Bridge Studios donated props and costumes. Because of the financial crisis, Gatecon decided to not hold any convention until 2010 in Vancouver, British Columbia, Canada. Gatecon's founder Allan Gowen said, "With the current world economic status it is making it harder and harder for people to attend conventions," as the reason why there is not going to be any Gatecon in 2009.

Until 2005, Gatecon was the main Stargate SG-1 fan convention. It was held in the Vancouver area, with more actor and crew member participation than other conventions. SG-1 conventions by Creation Entertainment were also marketed as "The Official Stargate SG-1 and Stargate Atlantis Tour", which mostly took place in the United States until Creation Entertainment acquired the license for Vancouver conventions in 2005. Wolf Events organized many SG-1 conventions in Europe, particularly in the UK and Germany.

== GateWorld ==
GateWorld
- Website type: Fan-news site
- Available in: English
- Owner: Darren Sumner
- Website: www.gateworld.net
- Launched: October 22, 1999; 26 years ago
- Current status: Active
- Content license: Copyright

GateWorld (also known as GateWorld.net and abbreviated to GW) is an English-language fan-news site-based webpage for British-Canadian American science fiction shows but lays most its weight on the Stargate franchise. It was started in 1999 by Stargate SG-1 fan Darren Sumner, to be an online community for fans of the show. Through its relationship with Metro-Goldwyn-Mayer (MGM), GateWorld occasionally offers exclusive news reports such as the recurring appearance of Claudia Black in season nine of Stargate SG-1 and the announcement of the third Stargate live-action television series being in development and the casting of Brian J. Smith in this new show.

GateWorld has an extensive show encyclopedia, cast interviews, an online store, forum, articles, reviews as well as a large episode guides, with transcripts and pictures. The site also features up-to-date news. The GateWorld forum has more than 44,000 members and 9,100,000 posts. The record number of users online at the same time was 2,770 as of 10 May 2011, the day after the last episode of Stargate Universe aired.

=== History ===
GateWorld was inaugurated on October 22, 1999, as "Starguide," a fan site that has changed addresses and servers many times since then. The site was developed by Darren Sumner, an SG-1 fan, to be an online community for the show Stargate SG-1, similar to web sites for other science fiction shows. Though the site focused on Stargate, other parts of the site were devoted to other sci-fi series in the form of episode guides. It was during this time that Starguide was given the new name GateWorld. The main site was completely redesigned in 2006 to coincide with the broadcast of Stargate SG-1's milestone 200th episode. With the cancellation of Stargate SG-1, Gateworld announced its support for SaveStargateSG1, a fan run campaign to get international networks and executives to show support for Stargate SG-1 and to help get it back on the air.

Although the webpage focuses on news coverage and the episode guides, it includes a large encyclopedia, reviews, and a store. Now, even the cast and producers of Stargate have contributed to the site with extensive multimedia interviews, blogs, spoilers, and live chats. The GateWorld Alpha Site is a site made by the creators of GateWorld. It was made in case of system problems with GateWorld that would stop fans from connecting to it. The site provides news on problems and updates on-site maintenance.

In 2007, GateWorld launched its Creation Storefront merchandise section, which includes DVDs, Stargate glassware, apparel, jewelry, photographs, autographs, keychains, and calendars available for purchase.

On January 4, 2008, GateWorld launched a new service called GateWorld Play, a Stargate video service similar to YouTube. Plans were to update this new channel "seven days per week for the foreseeable future".

=== Reception ===
On June 9, 2006 Entertainment Weekly became the first major publication to recognize GateWorld. The Province called GateWorld "amazingly detailed". GateWorld was the winner of the 2007 SyFy Genre Awards for "Best Web Site". It was also nominated in 2006. The producers of the Stargate franchise are in good contact with GateWorld and have mentioned the website favorably in several audio commentaries. In 2004, Darren Sumner was invited to tour through the sets of Stargate Atlantis and to interview the members of the series' crew. Since then, he and partner David Read make an annual pilgrimage to Vancouver, where the franchise is filmed, to visit the studio and interview the casts and crews of both shows for publication on GateWorld. Producer Joseph Mallozzi stated in his blog:

"I have always been a supporter of GateWorld and consider it the premiere site for Stargate fans online. In fact, I was the one who suggested to MGM Marketing several years back, that they look toward establishing some sort of working relationship with Darren and GateWorld."

— Joseph Mallozzi's, weblog

Looking back on producing SG-1' season 5, Joseph Mallozzi also stated in 2011:

"And, when we weren't writing or producing, we were checking out Gateworld which was fast becoming THE one stop shop for everything Stargate. In fact, Gateworld was so impressive in its scope and detail that we eventually abandoned updating the show's massive bible [...] in favor of directing prospective freelancers to the site. It blew all other Stargate-related sites, even the studio's which paled by comparison. Over the years, Gateworld evolved alongside the franchise, growing and improving. In later years, I would roll my eyes and fans on other forums would accuse Darren and David – "the Gateworld guys" as we called them – of simply being a PR arm of the franchise. The truth is, as incredible as they've been in the amount of support they’ve shown, there have also been incidents in which we've strongly disagreed with some of the decisions they've taken. Nothing that couldn't be talked through but, still, enough to remind everyone that Gateworld was and would remain a strong and independent online entity."

— Joseph Mallozzi's, weblog
