= Lucinda Kavski =

Lucinda Kaviski

Publication information
- Publisher: Lucinda universe
- First appearance: 2026
- First comic appearance: Lucinda Universe #1
- Created by: Gia Skova

Lucinda Kavski (also spelled Lucinda Kavsky) is a fictional character and the central figure of the Lucinda Universe multimedia

franchise, created by actress, writer, and filmmaker Gia Skova. Conceived as an intelligence operative whose narratives blend espionage, science fiction, adventure, and mystery, she is commonly known within the franchise by the codename "The Serpent."

Unlike traditional superheroes, the character possesses no innate superhuman powers, relying instead on advanced combat training, specialized technology, and strategic intelligence to navigate storylines centered around unexplained phenomena, time, and human perception.

The First appearance of Lucinda is in the movie the Serpent directed by Gia Skova

== Concept and development ==
Lucinda Kavski was conceived by Gia Skova as a protagonist designed to subvert traditional superhero tropes, placing an emphasis on investigation, personal transformation, and the search for hidden truths over brute physical power. According to Skova, the character was envisioned as a strong female hero who is simultaneously caring but fully capable of handling intense physical challenges and tactical operations.

The franchise's mythology is built around the fictional premise and recurring tagline "Recovered, not created," presenting the narrative as a collection of recovered records and fragmented historical accounts. In developmental and early promotional materials, the character's surname occasionally appeared with the alternative spelling "Kavsky", though "Kavski" remains the official spelling across the franchise.

== Characterization and attributes ==
Within the fictional continuity, Lucinda is characterized as a highly disciplined, analytical, and emotionally resilient strategist who maintains composure under high-pressure scenarios. Rather than operating on impulse, her methodology relies heavily on observation, advanced pattern recognition, and investigative expertise. She is depicted with extensive training in combat, surveillance, tactical planning, and multilingual proficiency.

Skova, who performed her own stunts for the live-action portrayal, emphasized that the physical preparation was intense, requiring real weapon handling and extensive combat choreography to reflect a professional CIA operative background. The character's operations are heavily supported by advanced navigational and analytical devices rather than direct weaponry. Her most definitive piece of equipment is the Chronocompass, a recurring symbol within the franchise used for navigation and strategic decision-making.

== Multimedia appearances and reception ==
The Lucinda Universe developed as a multimedia franchise, expanding into an upcoming comic book series. Skova noted that the development of the comic book fulfilled a long-held creative goal, with the franchise structured so that the initial live-action screen adaptation was produced and released prior to the final printed publication of the expanded comic mythos.

The character has attracted commentary for her distinct visual identity and the integration of physical stunt work within traditional sci-fi and espionage frameworks. Critical reception of her debut film highlighted the project's ambitious independent nature, with commentators noting the distinct narrative focus given to Skova's performance as an autonomous action lead.

== Official site ==
- The Serpent( 2020 film) original work and first instalment of Lucindaverse
- Gia Skova. actress and producer, creatror of Lucindaverse
- https://www.imdb.com/title/tt36751877/?ref_=nm_knf_t_3 ( official imdb)
