= List of Playboy Playmates of 2011 =

The following is a list of Playboy Playmates of 2011. Playboy magazine names its Playmate of the Month each month throughout the year.

== January ==
Anna Sophia Berglund
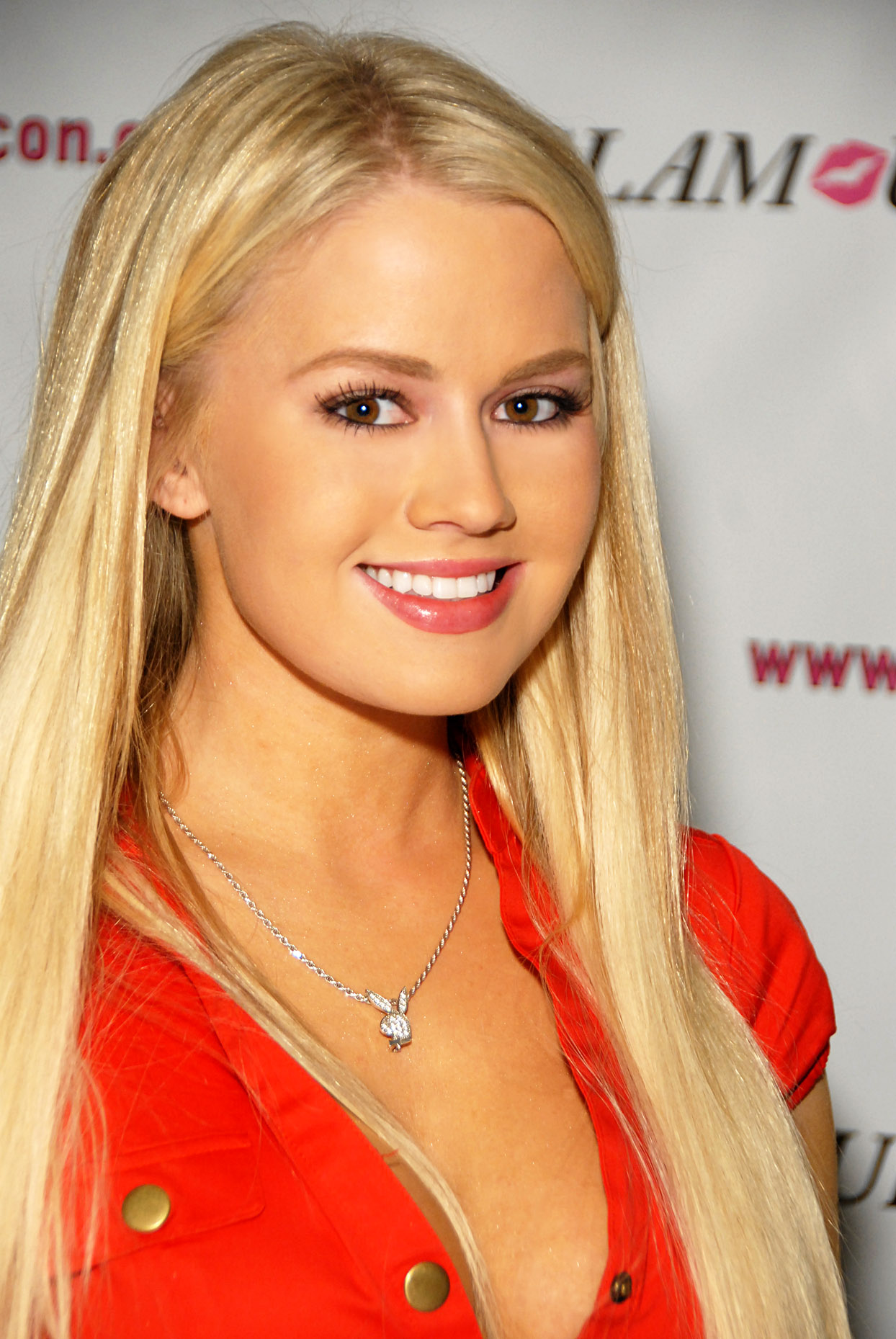
- Berglund in 2011

Personal details
- Born: April 5, 1986 (age 40) San Pedro, California
- Height: 5 ft 6 in (1.68 m)

Anna Sophia Berglund (born April 5, 1986) is the Playboy Playmate of the Month for January 2011. Her centerfold was photographed by Stephen Wayda. She is of Swedish descent.

== February ==
Kylie Johnson

Personal details
- Born: November 30, 1990 (age 35) Fort Ord, California
- Height: 5 ft 4 in (1.63 m)

Kylie Johnson (born November 30, 1990) is the Playboy Playmate of the Month for February 2011.

== March ==
Ashley Mattingly
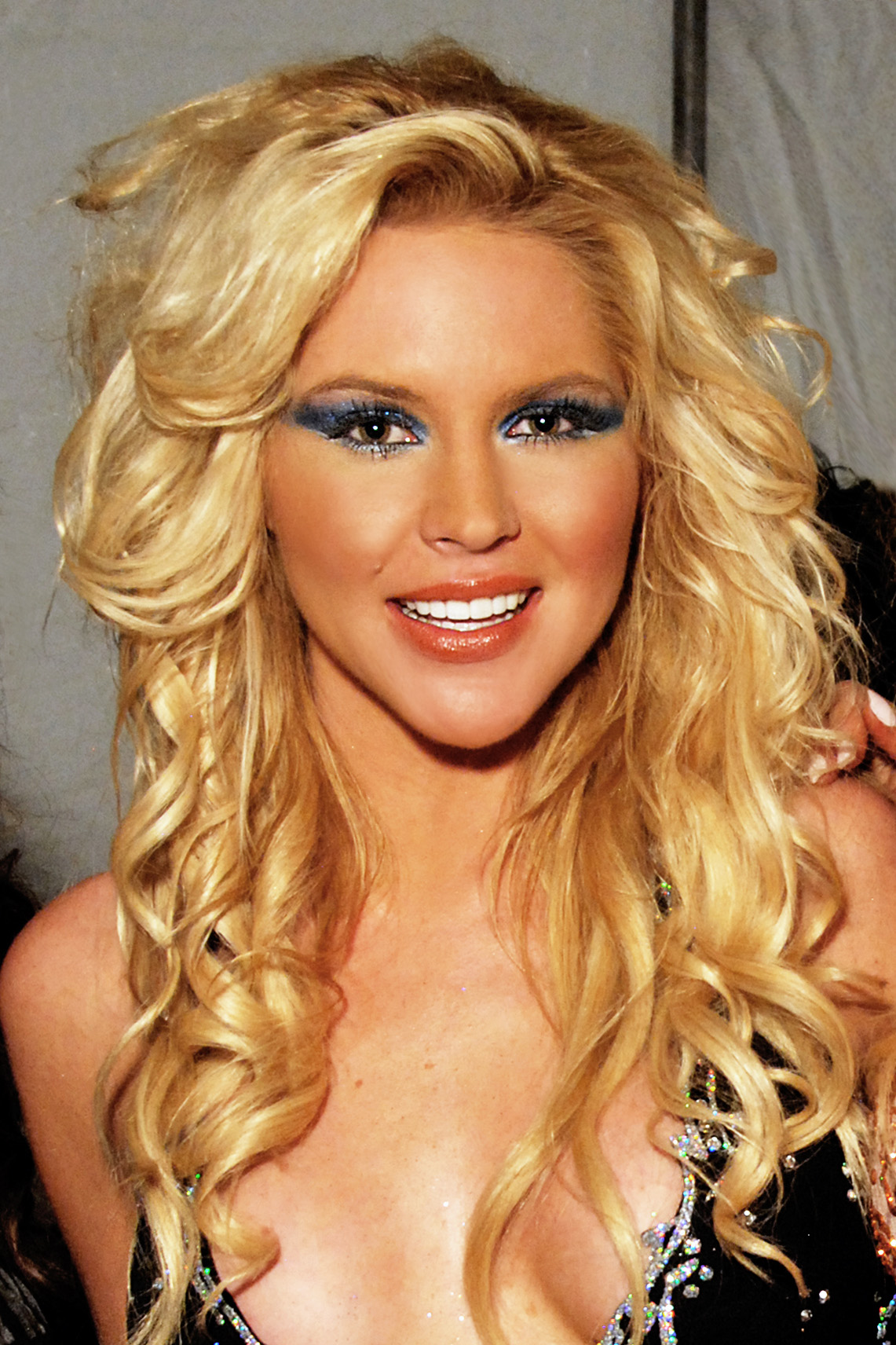
- Mattingly in 2011

Personal details
- Born: 10 September 1986 Dallas, Texas
- Died: 15 April 2020 (aged 33) Austin, Texas
- Height: 5 ft 7 in (1.70 m)

Ashley Mattingly (September 10, 1986 – April 15, 2020) was the Playboy Playmate of the Month for March 2011. She died in 2020 of suicide by gunshot, with her family reporting she was struggling with alcohol and substance abuse beforehand.

== April ==
Jaclyn Swedberg
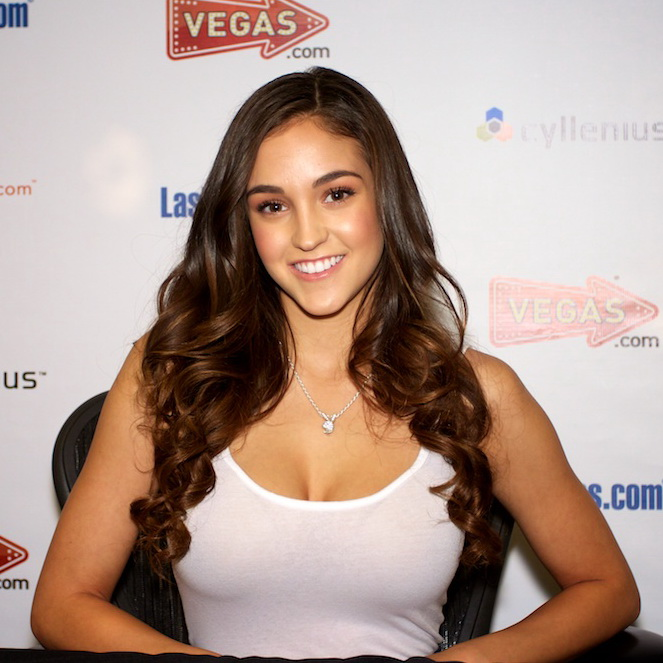
- Swedberg in 2011

Playboy Playmate of the Year
- 2012
- Preceded by: Claire Sinclair
- Succeeded by: Raquel Pomplun

Personal details
- Born: August 14, 1990 (age 35) San Pedro, California
- Height: 5 ft 5 in (1.65 m)

Jaclyn Swedberg (born August 14, 1990) is the Playboy Playmate of the Month for April 2011 and the 2012 Playmate of the Year. She had auditioned in 2010, and spent the year prior to her pictorial doing various shows for Playboy TV. Swedberg made her feature film debut starring in the 2015 independent horror film Muck, and is set to return in the film's sequel Muck: Feast of Saint Patrick.

== May ==
Sasha Bonilova
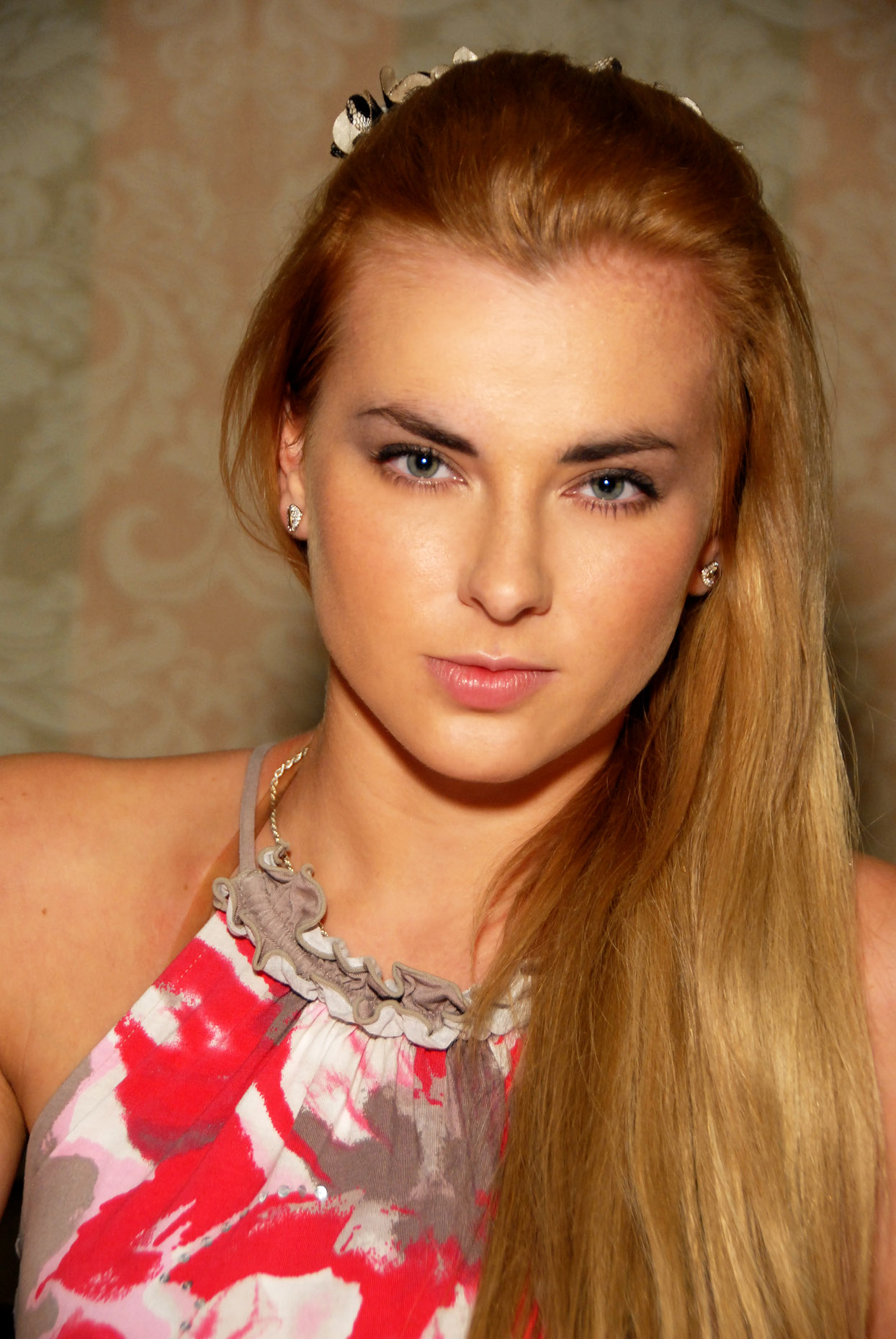
- Bonilova at Glamourcon in Long Beach, California, 2011

Personal details
- Born: May 20, 1987 (age 39) Lutsk, Ukraine, Soviet Union
- Height: 5 ft 7 in (1.70 m)

Sasha Bonilova (born May 20, 1987) is the Playboy Playmate of the Month for May 2011.

== June ==
Mei-Ling Lam

Personal details
- Born: January 26, 1984 (age 42) Waterville, Maine
- Height: 5 ft 6 in (1.68 m)

Mei-Ling Lam (born January 26, 1984) is the Playboy Playmate of the Month for June 2011. She is the first Playmate from Maine.

== July ==
Jessa Hinton
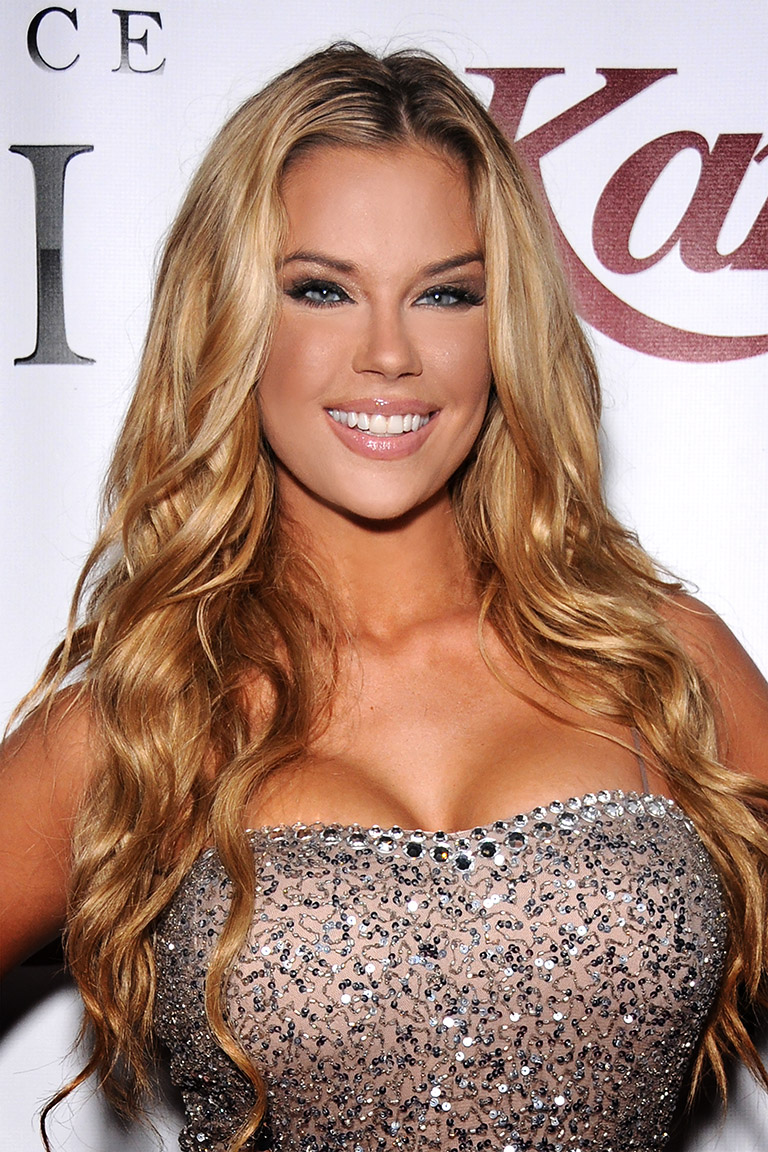
- Hinton in 2013

Personal details
- Born: April 10, 1984 (age 42) Los Angeles, California
- Height: 5 ft 8 in (1.73 m)

Jessa Hinton (born April 10, 1984) is the Playboy Playmate of the Month for July 2011. Prior to her Playmate appearance she performed as a Bunny at the Palms Playboy Club and was selected as the Cyber Girl of the Month for October 2009. Her friend, Playmate Marketa Janska, submitted her photos to Playboy resulting in her selection as Miss July.

Hinton was discovered at a wedding at age 14 by a talent manager. She later appeared in three television commercials and had roles on Baywatch and 7th Heaven. She did not start modeling until age eighteen. In 2010, she was the face of a marketing campaign for the Palms Casino Resort. Hinton has also been a reporter and interviewer for event series such as Victory Poker and ESPN Top Rank Boxing. She has interviewed professional players and celebrities such as Dan Bilzerian and fighters such as Manny Pacquiao and Shane Mosley.

Hinton has her own bikini line in partnership with the clothing company Affliction. She has also participated with the NOH8 campaign and is a member of Aid for AIDS Nevada. Hinton is also interested in MMA sports and has self identified as bisexual since her teenage years.

== August ==
Iryna Ivanova

Personal details
- Born: April 6, 1987 (age 39) Voronezh, Russian SFSR, Soviet Union
- Height: 5 ft 4 in (1.63 m)

Iryna Ivanova (born April 6, 1987) is the Playboy Playmate of the Month for August 2011. Ivanova was born in Voronezh, Russia and raised in Feodosia, Crimea, and then as a teenager (age 16) emigrated to the U.S. Prior to her pictorial, she was a student at the University of Arizona studying to earn her MBA. At the time her ambitions were to earn a PhD and become a fashion consultant. In addition to modeling, she is a Russian-English interpreter and works as a cage girl for the World Fighting Federation in Phoenix, Arizona. She appears in the video for DJ Khaled, Justin Bieber, Chance the Rapper and Lil Wayne's song I'm The One.

== September ==
Tiffany Toth
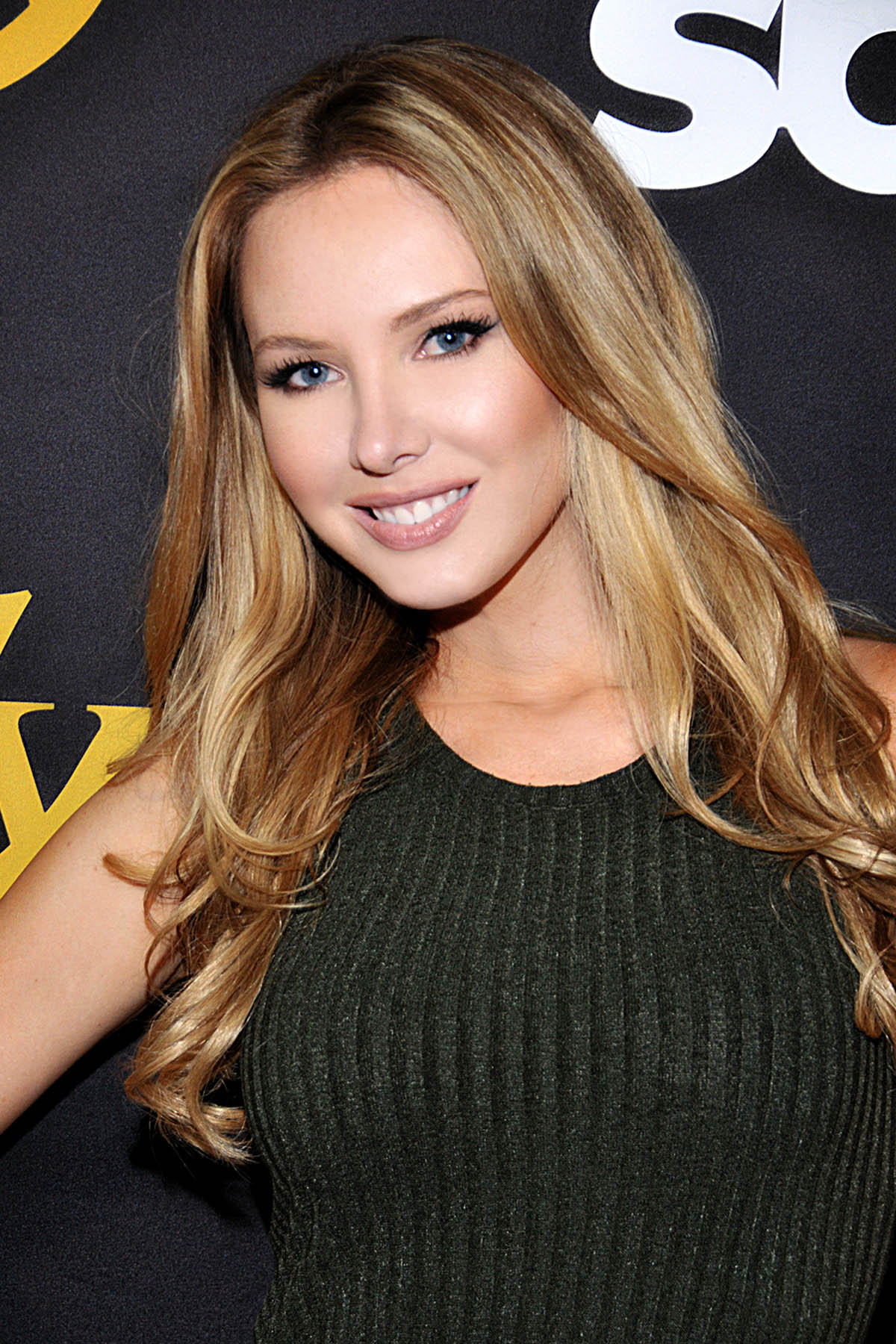
- Toth in 2016

Personal details
- Born: March 28, 1986 (age 40) Anaheim, California, U.S.
- Height: 5 ft 8 in (1.73 m)

Tiffany Toth (born March 28, 1986) is the Playboy Playmate of the Month for September 2011.

== October ==
Amanda Cerny
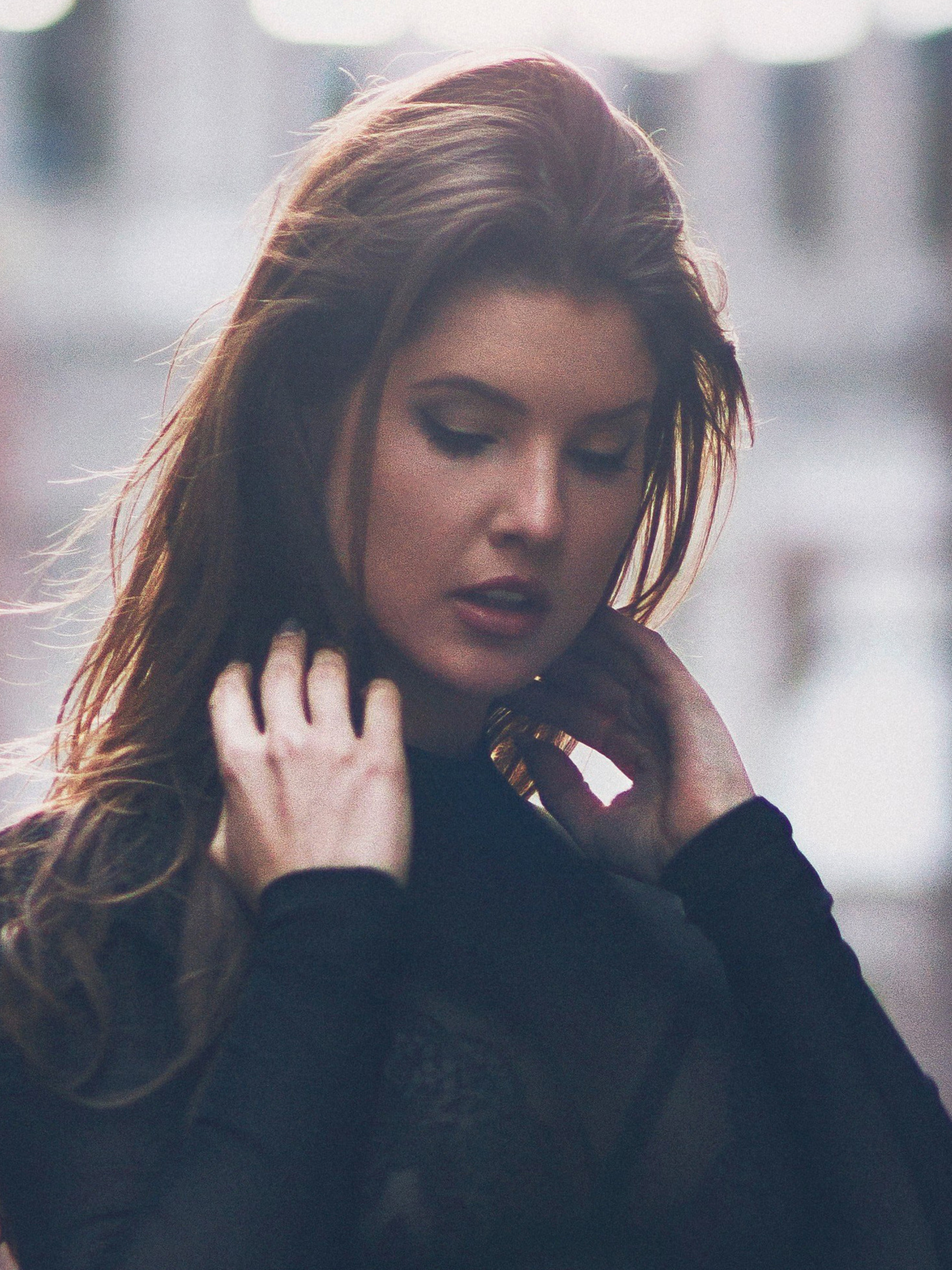
- Cerny in 2018

Personal details
- Born: June 26, 1991 (age 34) Pittsburgh, Pennsylvania
- Height: 5 ft 7 in (1.70 m)

Amanda Rachelle Cerny (born June 26, 1991) is the Playboy Playmate of the Month for October 2011. She began modeling at 15 years old but was convinced by Kelly Carrington, Miss October 2008, to send in photos to Playboy. After her appearance in the magazine, she continued to professionally model, often for glamour photography. She made her feature film debut in the comedy The Bet. Cerny is of Czech, German, and Italian descent.

== November ==
Ciara Price
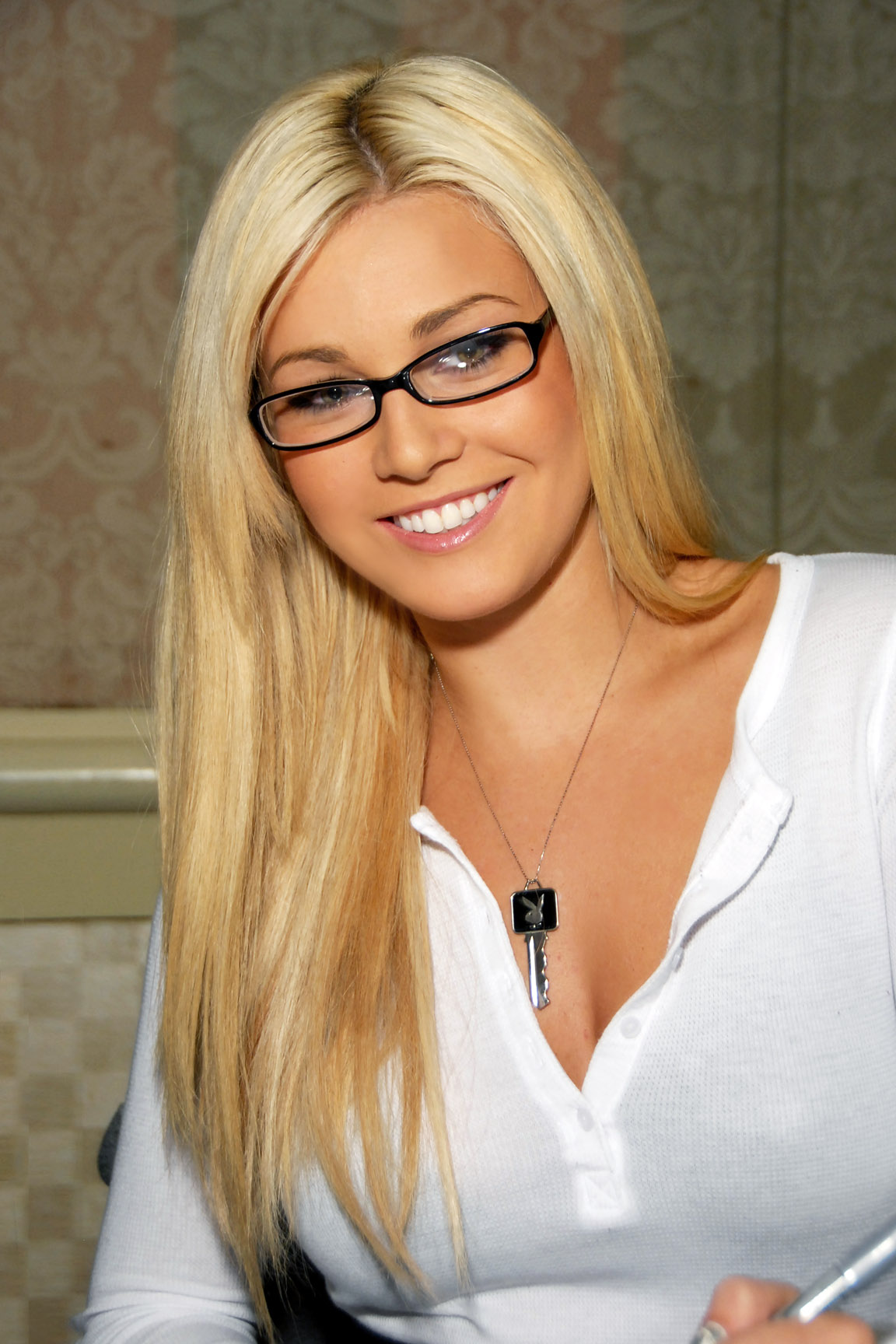
- Price in 2011

Personal details
- Born: May 10, 1990 (age 36) Portland, Maine
- Height: 5 ft 4 in (1.63 m)

Ciara Price (born May 10, 1990) is the Playboy Playmate of the Month for November 2011.

== December ==
Rainy Day Jordan

Personal details
- Born: April 8, 1991 (age 35) Abilene, Texas
- Height: 5 ft 9 in (1.75 m)

Rainy Day Jordan (born April 8, 1991) is the Playboy Playmate of the Month for December 2011.

== See also ==
- List of people in Playboy 2010–2019
