= List of Playboy Playmates of 2012 =

The following is a list of Playboy Playmates of 2012. Playboy magazine names their Playmate of the Month each month throughout the year.

== January ==
Heather Knox
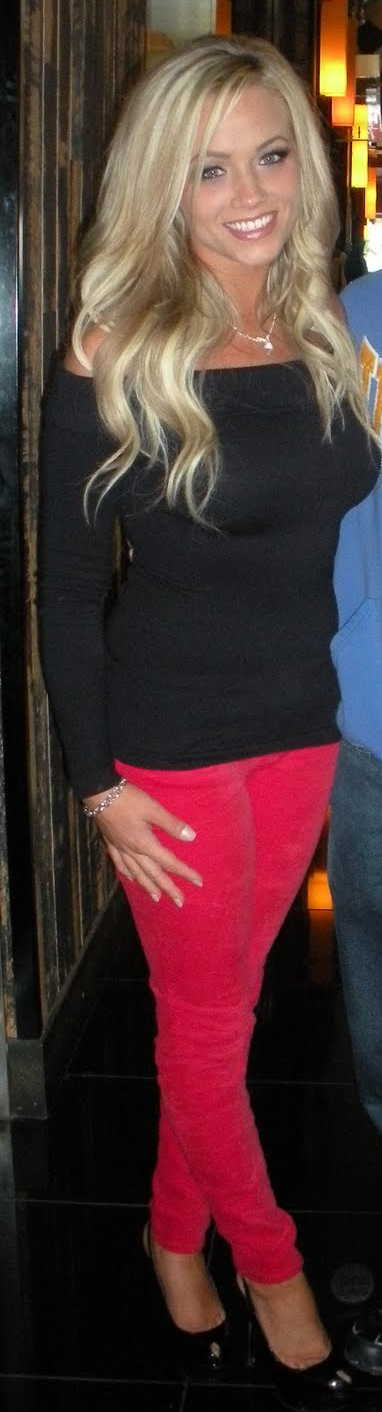
- Knox in 2011

Personal details
- Born: January 17, 1985 (age 41) Indianapolis, Indiana
- Height: 5 ft 4 in (1.63 m)

Heather Knox (born January 17, 1985) is the Playboy Playmate of the Month for January 2012. Her centerfold was photographed by Arny Freytag.

== February ==
Leola Bell

Personal details
- Born: December 20, 1984 (age 41) Rockville, Maryland
- Height: 5 ft 4 in (1.63 m)

Leola Bell (born December 20, 1984) is the Playboy Playmate of the Month for February 2012. Her centerfold was photographed by Stephen Wayda. Leola is the 700th Playmate.

== March ==
Lisa Seiffert

Personal details
- Born: August 30, 1982 (age 44) Bowen, Queensland, Australia
- Height: 5 ft 11 in (1.80 m)

Lisa Seiffert (born August 30, 1982) is the Playboy Playmate of the Month for March 2012. Her centerfold was photographed by Sasha Eisenman. Lisa is also Playboy France's Miss June/July 2009.

== April ==
Raquel Pomplun
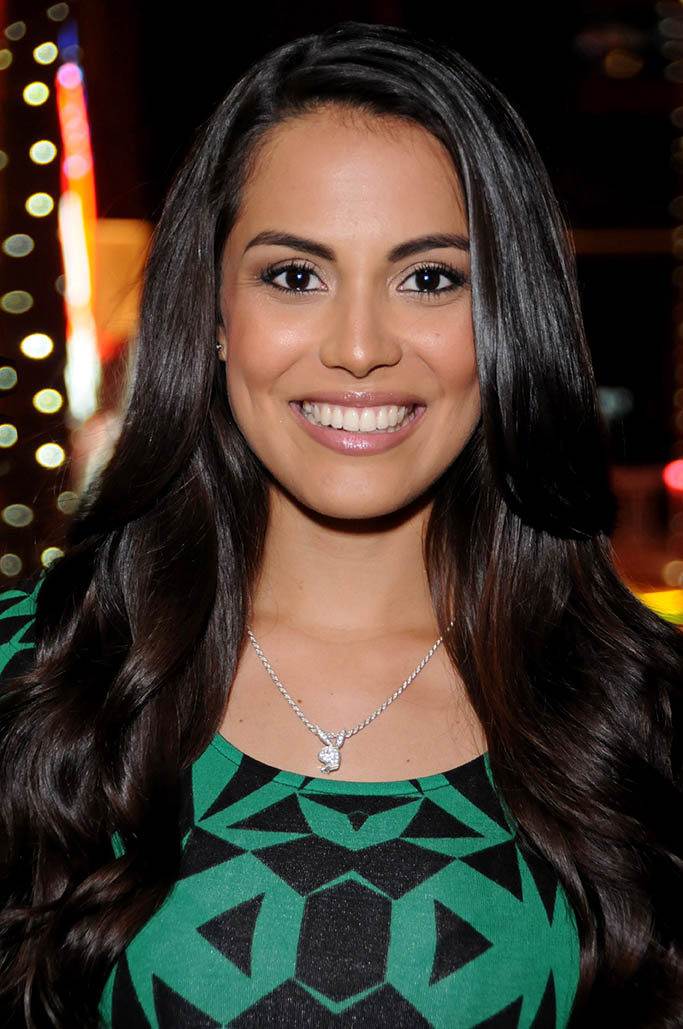
- Pomplun in 2013

Playboy Playmate of the Year
- 2013
- Preceded by: Jaclyn Swedberg
- Succeeded by: Kennedy Summers

Personal details
- Born: October 24, 1987 (age 39) San Diego, California
- Height: 5 ft 6 in (1.68 m)

Raquel Pomplun (born October 24, 1987) is a model and actress and the Playboy Playmate of the Month for April 2012 and 2013 Playmate of the Year. She was the first Mexican-American to earn the title of Playmate of the Year, Her centerfold was photographed by Arny Freytag.

Pomplun has also had roles in movies and television series as well as appearances on various shows. She is the host of the martial arts series Rockin' Rounds and has appeared on episodes of Mockpocalypse and Agents of S.H.I.E.L.D.. Her movie appearances include the 2014 Mark Wahlberg crime drama The Gambler and the 2016 horror movie Muck with fellow Playmate Jaclyn Swedberg.

Pomplun spent part of her childhood in Tijuana before moving to Chula Vista after middle school. She later attended Bonita Vista High School. Pomplun has trained as a classical ballet dancer and studied biochemistry at Southwestern College.

== May ==
Nikki Leigh
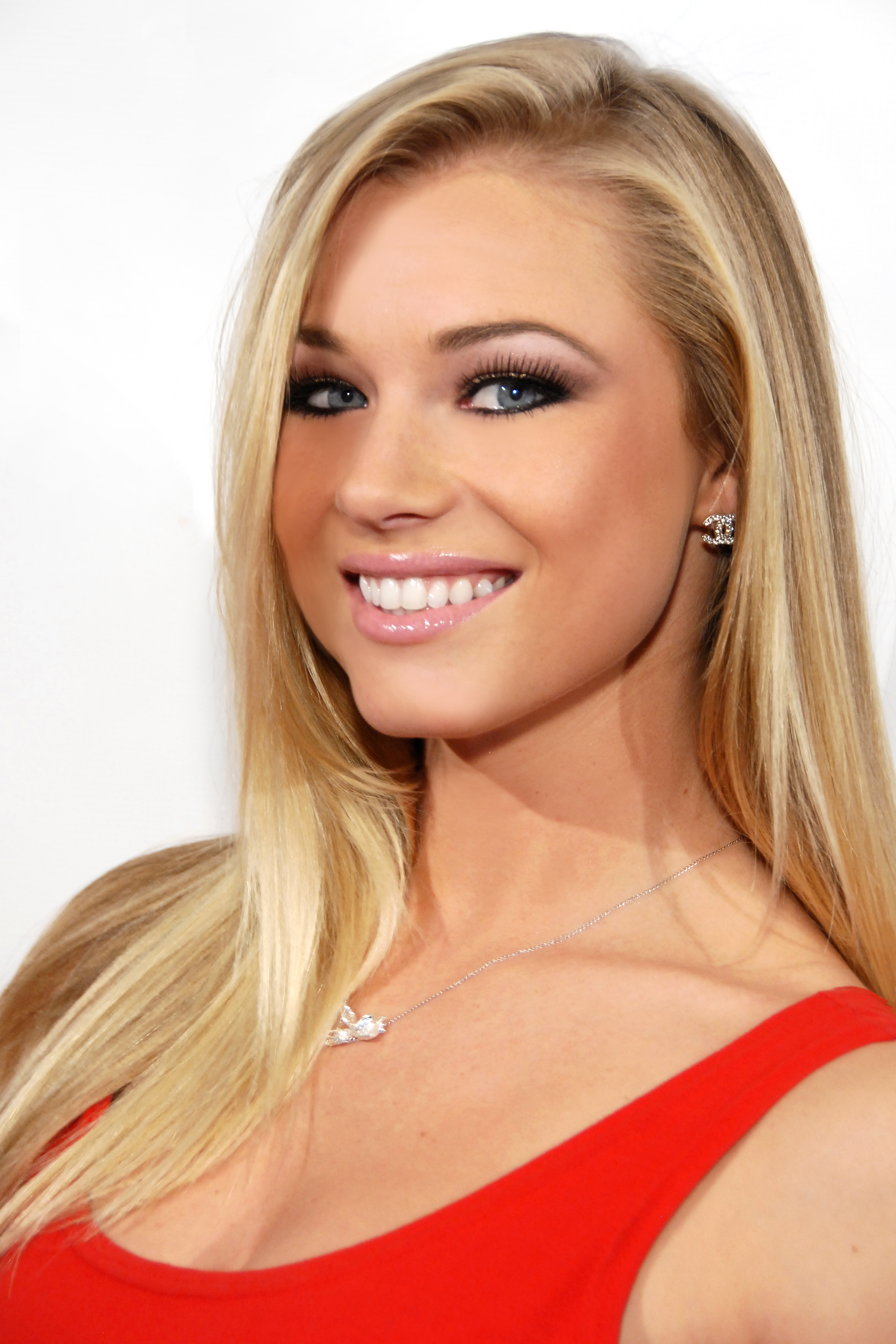
- Leigh in 2012

Personal details
- Born: September 13, 1988 (age 38) Cypress, California
- Height: 5 ft 3 in (1.60 m)
- Official website

Nikki Leigh (born September 13, 1988) is a model and actress and the Playboy Playmate of the Month for May 2012. Her centerfold was photographed by Stephen Wayda.

Leigh has made appearances in a variety of television series and movies. Television appearances include Two and a Half Men, Badass!, and Tosh.0 . Movie appearances include the horror film, The Sand, the dramatic film, La Migra and the comedy films, The Wedding Ringer, and The Bet. She starred in the 2017 Lifetime (TV network) film Open Marriage and co-starred in the 2018 Lifetime TV film The Midwife's Deception.

Leigh was born in Southern California and is a California State University of Fullerton Cum Laude and Golden Key Honor Society graduate.

== June ==
Amelia Talon
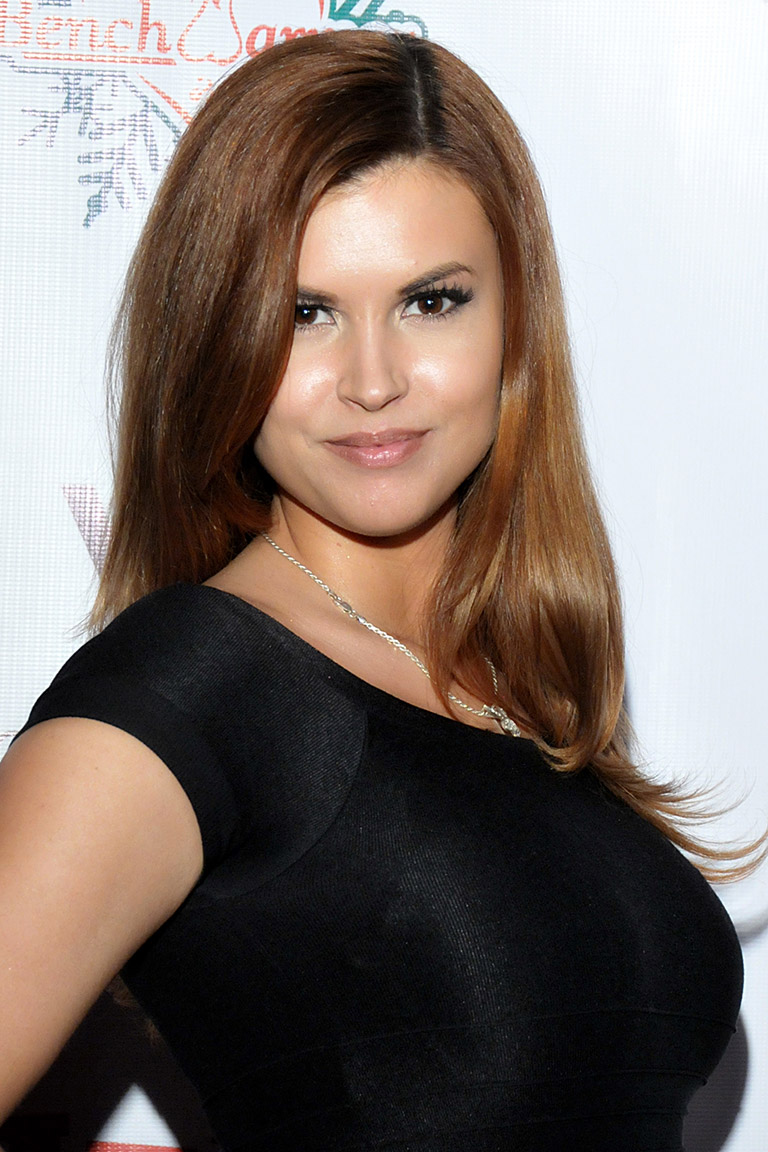
- Talon in 2014

Personal details
- Born: January 5, 1990 (age 36) Port Angeles, Washington
- Height: 5 ft 7 in (1.70 m)

Amelia Talon (born January 5, 1990) is the Playboy Playmate of the Month for June 2012 Her centerfold was photographed by Stephen Wayda. Talon is a self-professed gamer and routinely posts video on YouTube about her gaming activities and personal life.

== July ==
Shelby Chesnes
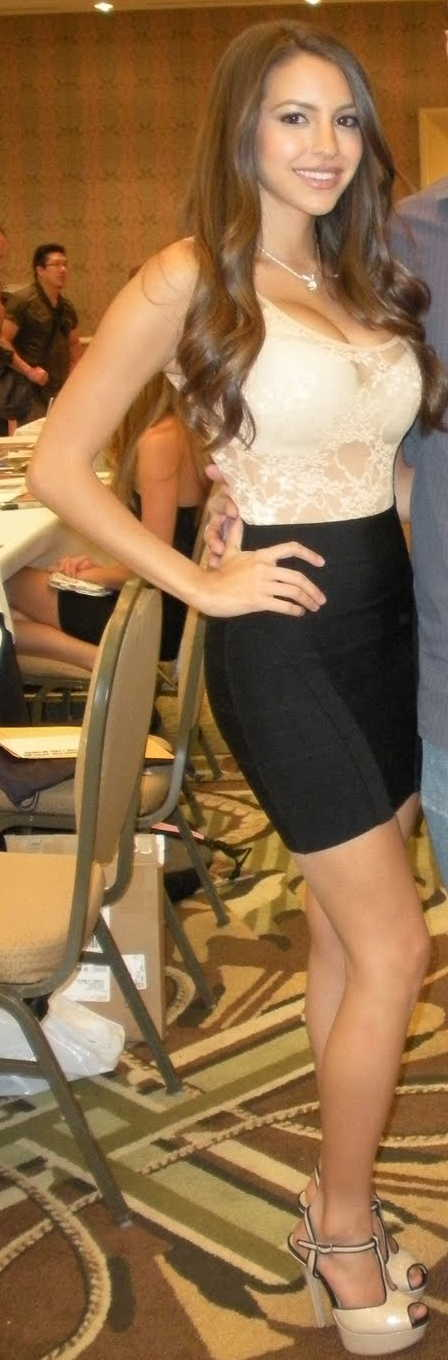
- Chesnes at Glamourcon 54 in 2012

Personal details
- Born: February 14, 1991 (age 35) Jupiter, Florida
- Height: 5 ft 3 in (1.60 m)

Shelby Chesnes (born February 14, 1991) is the Playboy Playmate of the Month for July 2012. Her centerfold was photographed by Stephen Wayda. In 2014 she made an appearance in the comedy feature film Horrible Bosses 2 with Jason Sudeikis.

== August ==
Beth Williams
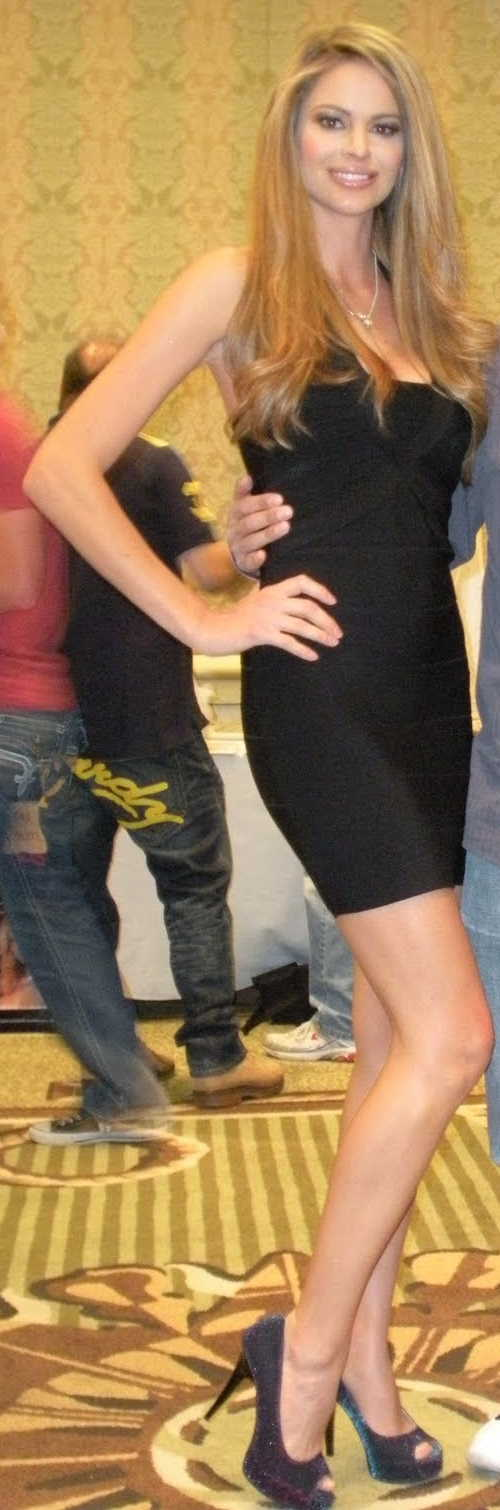
- Williams at Glamourcon 54, in 2012

Personal details
- Born: February 5, 1987 (age 39) Athens, Ohio
- Height: 5 ft 9 in (1.75 m)

Beth Williams (born February 5, 1987) is a model and the Playboy Playmate of the Month for August 2012. Her centerfold was photographed by Stephen Wayda.

== September ==
Alana Campos
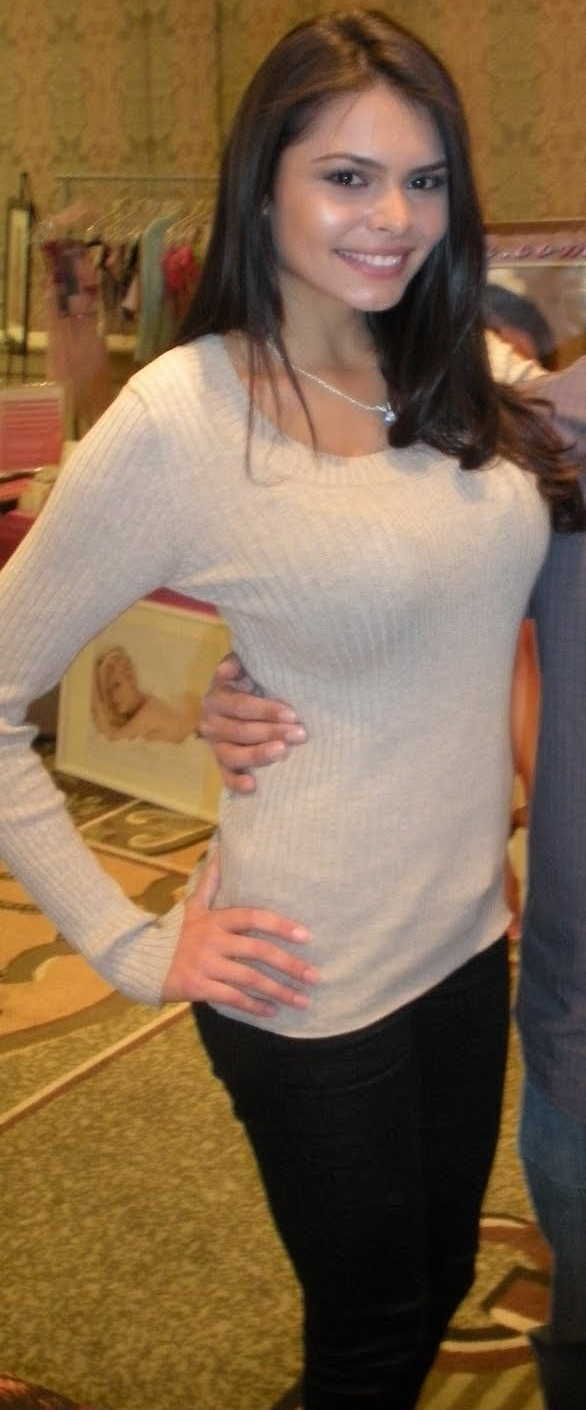
- Campos at Glamourcon 54 in 2012

Personal details
- Born: November 5, 1990 (age 36) Florianópolis, Brazil
- Height: 5 ft 9 in (1.75 m)

Alana Campos (born November 5, 1990) is a model and actress and the Playboy Playmate of the Month for September 2012. Her centerfold was photographed by Arny Freytag.

== October ==
Pamela Horton
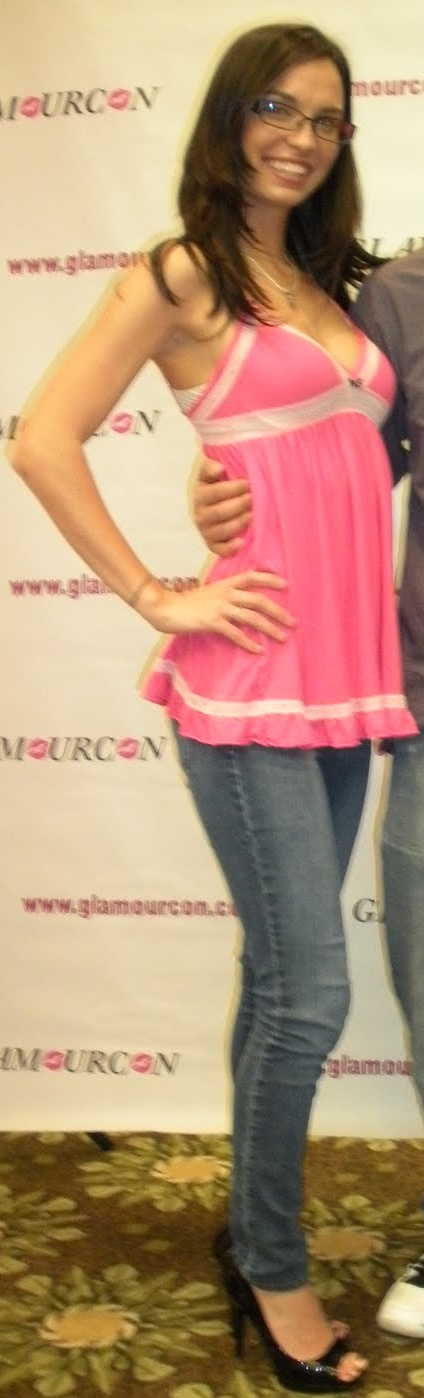
- Horton at Glamourcon 54 in 2012

Personal details
- Born: May 4, 1988 (age 38) Whittier, California
- Height: 5 ft 7 in (1.70 m)

Pamela Horton (born May 4, 1988) is actress and commentator and the Playboy Playmate of the Month for October 2012. Her centerfold was photographed by Arny Freytag. Horton is heavily into video and online games such as World of Warcraft. Since her pictorial, she has ventured into game reviews and commentary as well as game development. In October 2014 for the release of Bayonetta 2, Nintendo partnered with Playboy to set a photo shoot with Horton cosplaying Bayonetta. She was also known for dating Smosh co-founder Ian Hecox and starring in several projects created and directed by the Youtuber Markiplier including Who Killed Markiplier? and the animated spin off Damien and a main role in In Space with Markiplier.

== November ==
Britany Nola

Personal details
- Born: April 12, 1991 (age 35) Toronto, Canada
- Height: 5 ft 9 in (1.75 m)

Britany Nola Patterson (born April 12, 1991) is the Playboy Playmate of the Month for November 2012. Her centerfold was photographed by Stephen Wayda.

== December ==
Amanda Streich

Personal details
- Born: May 26, 1993 (age 33) Płock, Poland
- Height: 5 ft 9 in (1.75 m)

Amanda Streich (born May 26, 1993) is the Playboy Playmate of the Month for December 2012. Her centerfold was photographed by Arny Freytag.

== See also ==
- List of people in Playboy 2010–2019
