= Birthright (Stargate SG-1) =

- Stargate SG-1 episode
- Episode no.: Season 7 Episode 10
- Directed by: Peter Woeste
- Written by: Christopher Judge
- Teleplay by: Damian Kindler
- Cinematography by: James Menard
- Editing by: Rick Martin
- Production code: P274
- Original air date: August 15, 2003
- Running time: 44 minutes

Guest appearances
- Jolene Blalock as Ishta; Christine Adams as Mala; Kathleen Duborg as Neith; Kirsten Zien as Nesa; Teryl Rothery as Dr. Janet Fraiser; Simone Bailly as Ka'lel; Nigel Vonas as Ryk'l; Elizabeth Weinstein as Emta; Julie Hill as Ginra; Nikki Smook as Nictal

Episode chronology
← Previous "Avenger 2.0"	Next → "Evolution"
- Stargate SG-1 (season 7)

"Birthright" is the 10th episode from the seventh season military science fiction adventure television show Stargate SG-1. The 142nd episode overall, "Birthright" was first broadcast on the Sci-fi Channel in the United States on August 15, 2003. The episode was written by Christopher Judge, who is best known as the character Teal'c on the show. Peter Woeste directed the episode.

In the episode, SG-1 encounters a group of Jaffa called the Hak'tyl. The team learns from the group's leader, Ishta (Jolene Blalock), that since the Goa'uld system lord Moloc declared that all newborn female Jaffa in his domain be sacrificed, the Hak'tyl have been secretly saving as many as they can. As the resistance depends on the increasingly-difficult-to-acquire Goa'uld symbiotes, SG-1 believe a drug called Tretonin can abate them.

This is the third of four episodes of Stargate SG-1 written by Christopher Judge and incorporates elements of the Amazons from Greek mythology, as well as looking at sexism and femicide within the fictional Jaffa and Goa'uld races. A sequel episode called "Sacrifices", also written by Judge, features as part of season 8.

== Plot ==
While on a mission on an alien planet, SG-1 is attacked by Goa'uld Jaffa forces. Suddenly, six female Jaffa warriors storm in and take out the attackers. One of the warriors, Mala (Christine Adams) tells SG-1 they have sought them out and asks the team to accompany them back to their outpost, called Hak'tyl. SG-1 are introduced to their leader Ishta (Jolene Blalock), who explains that she is part of a resistance against the Goa'uld Moloc. They learn that Moloc has declared that all female Jaffa born within his domain be executed, as he believes that only male Jaffa can win his war against enemy Goa'uld. Ishta, Mala and Neith (Kathleen Duborg), all of whom served Moloc, tell Major Samantha Carter (Amanda Tapping) that they have been secretly saving newborn female Jaffa, smuggling them back to Hak'tyl. Needing Goa'uld symbiotes to survive, the Hak'tyl have been ambushing Jaffa patrols in order to take their symbiotes and give them to Hak'tyl when they come of age. Ishta appeals to Carter that Earth help them in procuring the Goa'uld symbiotes, and Carter explains to them that they've developed a drug called Tretonin that can be used instead of a symbiote. The idea is detestable to Neith, whose younger sister, Nesa, is fast approaching the age where she will need a symbiote.

Teal'c seeks out Ishta, who is unconvinced by the idea of using Tretonin and eventually she learns that Teal'c no longer has a symbiote and is using the drug. Ishta informs her people of the development and Mala, along with four other volunteers, travel to Stargate Command to test the drug. Nesa (Kirsten Zien) wants to volunteer, but her sister, Neith, does not allow her to go. The Hak'tyl volunteers are greeted by General George Hammond (Don S. Davis) at Stargate Command, and soon Dr. Janet Fraiser (Teryl Rothery) begins trialing the drug. Meanwhile, back on Hak'tyl, Teal'c and Ishta grow close as they stay up late into the night talking. Daniel Jackson (Michael Shanks) tells Nesa about how the drug can save her but is then confronted by her older sister Neith.

Back at Stargate Command, Mala has not responded to the Tretonin, and her situation has become dire. Although she will die without it, she refuses to take back her symbiote. Back on the planet, Neith plans to challenge Ishta's leadership, despite the worries of the others.

== Production ==
=== Writing and cast ===
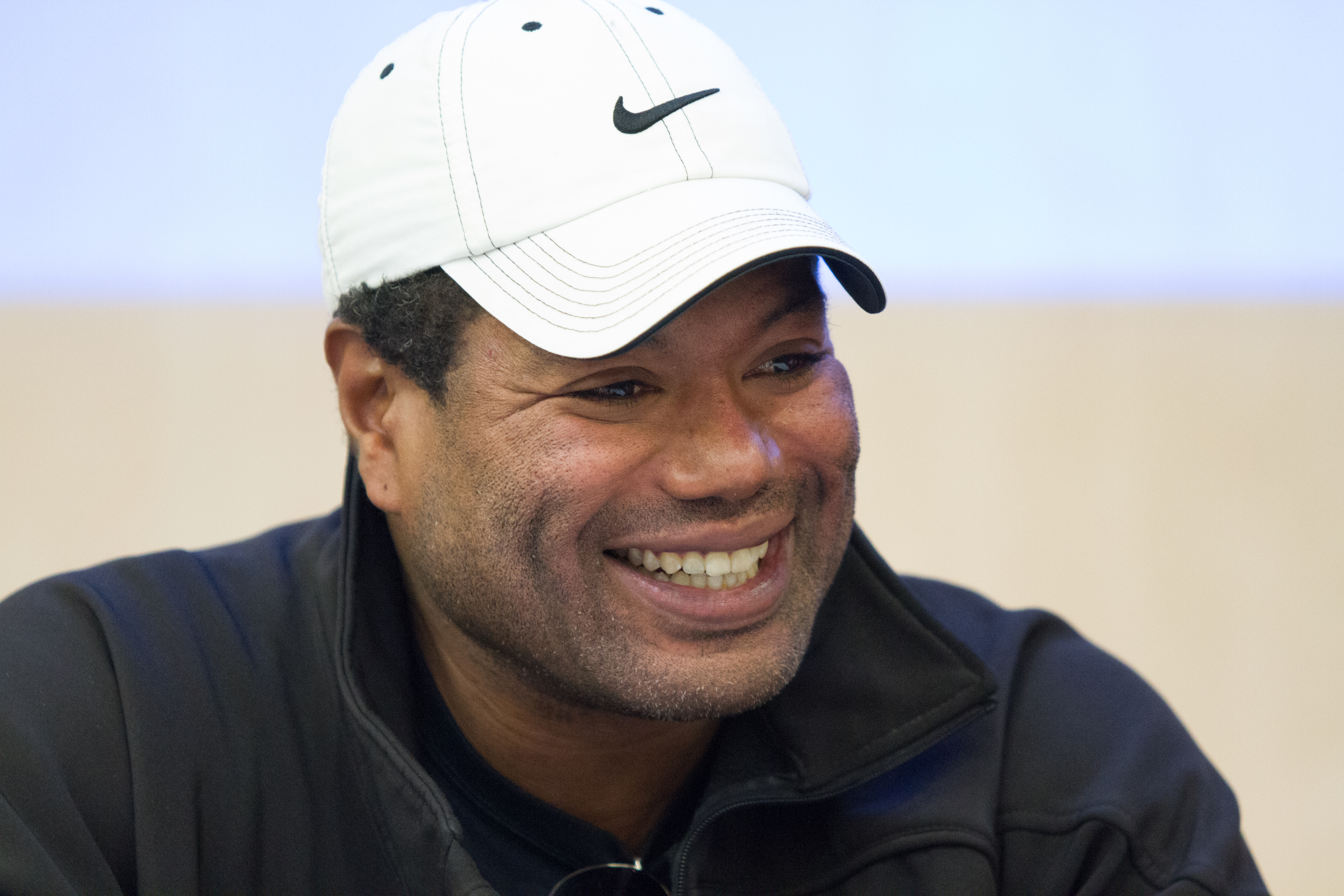
"Birthright" is the third episode written by Christopher Judge, who also portrays the character of Teal'c in the series.

Years previously Christopher Judge, who also plays the character of Teal'c, had been encouraged by creator of the series Brad Wright to write for the show. Judge commented that there was somewhat of a reluctance amongst the shows writers to make Teal'c-centric episodes, with the exceptions of Peter DeLuise and Damian Kindler, so if Judge wanted more episodes, he should write them. Judge first pitched the concept of exploring the Amazons from Greek mythology in Stargate SG-1 around the time of season 5 in 2001, with Judge asserting that the Amazons "kind of lent itself very well to the whole Jaffa mythology". Around this time, Judge also pitched another episode, "The Warrior" which became his primary writing focus at the time. The following year, Judge worked again on his Amazons story with series creator Brad Wright, plotting out more elements of the story. Judge later explained that he was struggling in "tying it all in to why SG-1 would even be there", so instead decided to again pitch an entirely different episode to Wright, who encouraged Judge to instead focus on his new idea which would eventually become the season 6 episode "The Changeling". Prior to season 7, Judge had reworked the story: "I came up with concept of these women under one particular God who so wanted warriors that he would kill off the children until he got a boy - which led to one of their princesses spiriting their children away and so on". Judge then worked with showrunner Robert C. Cooper on finalising the structure of the story, with Cooper later reflecting "we really didn't want to do the typical Amazon story, and he always intended it to be very much about an underground railroad of women created by women who had been badly mistreated by a misogynistic Jaffa society".

Following the events of Judge's season 6 episode "The Changeling", where Teal'c loses his Goa'uld symbiote, Judge was keen to try and "take Teal'c another step towards being more human" in season 7. Judge was interested in developing a love interest for Teal'c, joking that "Teal'c is a totally red-blooded male. It stands to reason he would want a little feminine company every once in a while", jesting that "the only way his character could form some sort of romantic entanglement on the show was to write it himself". After finishing work on "Birthright", Judge had plotted out a three-part arc involving Ishta and Teal'c, although hadn't yet pitched it to Cooper.

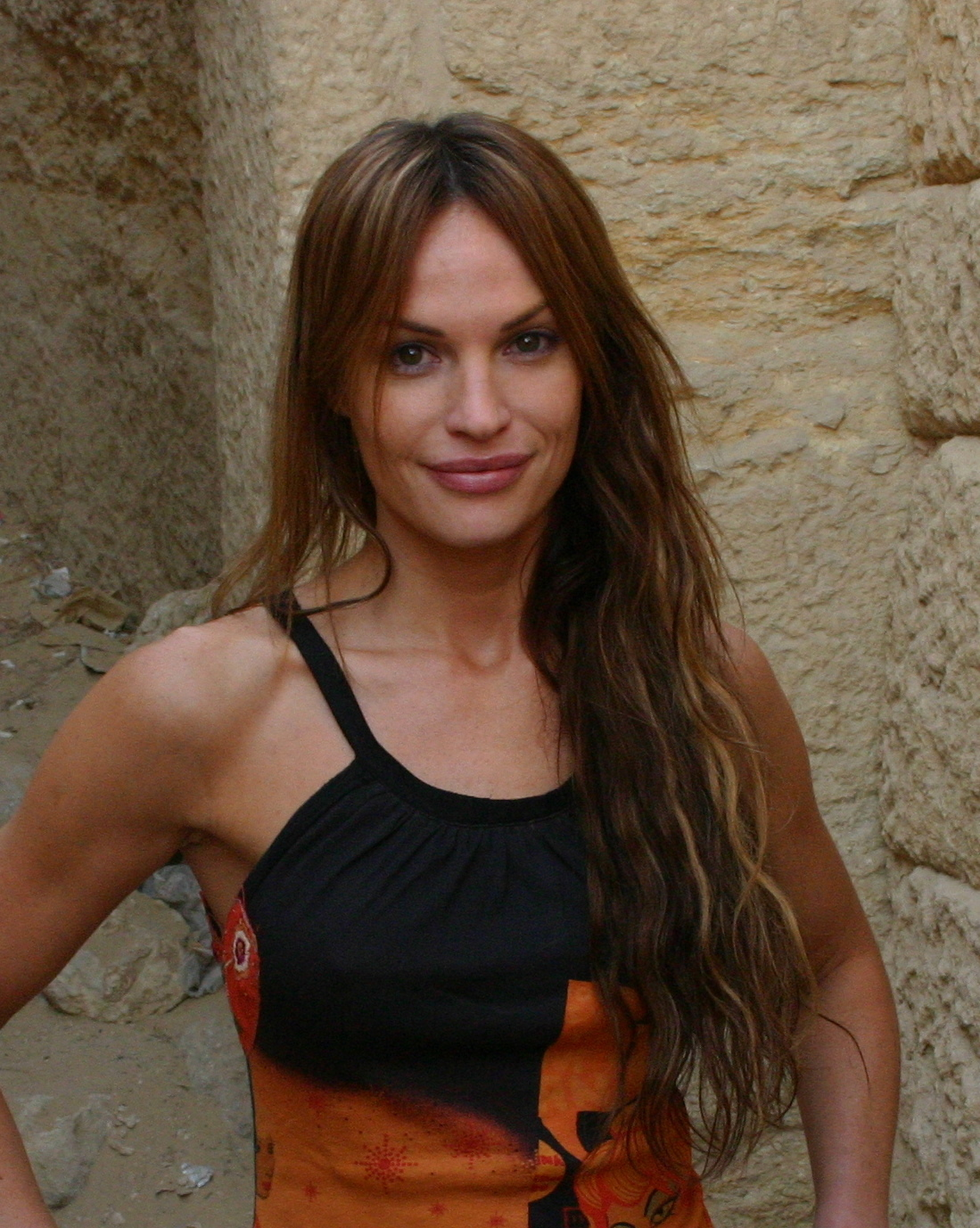
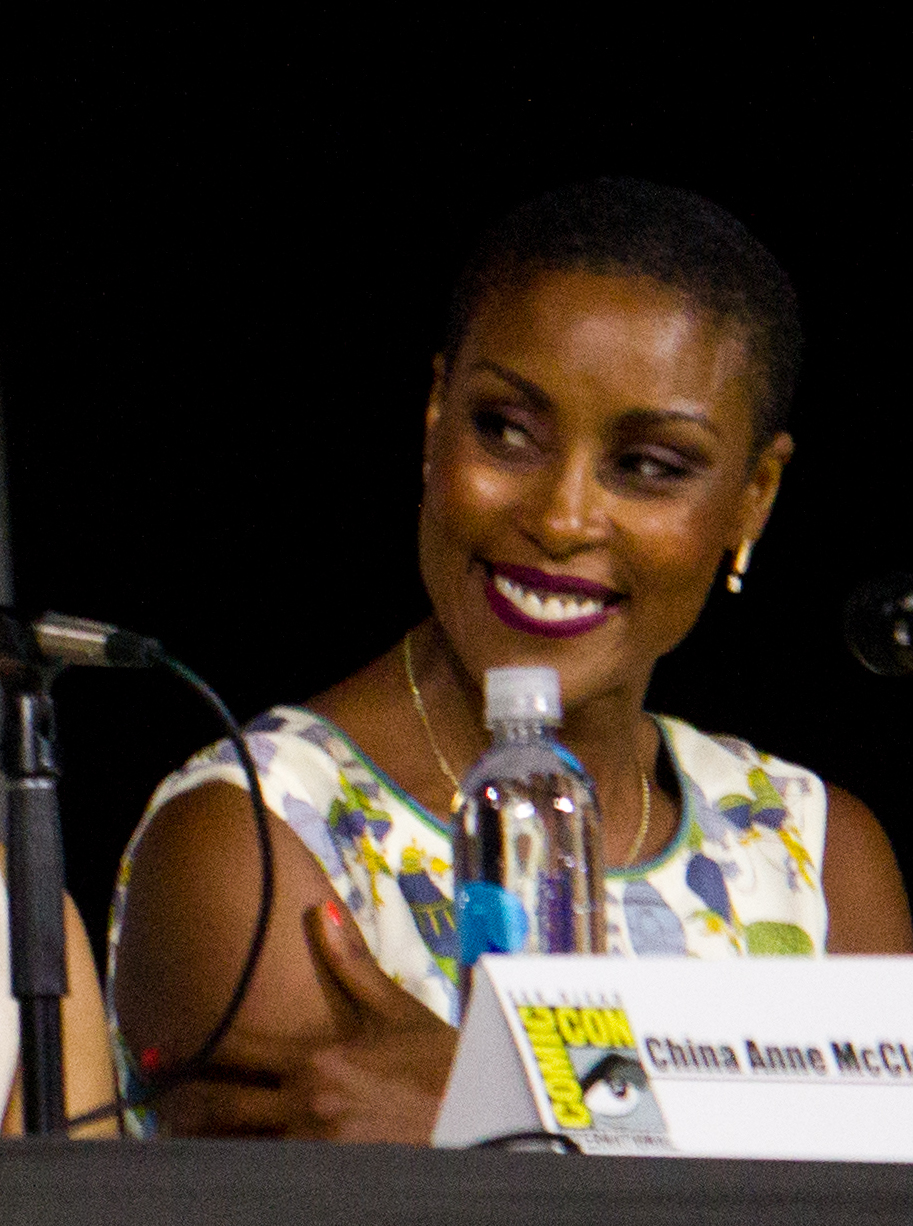
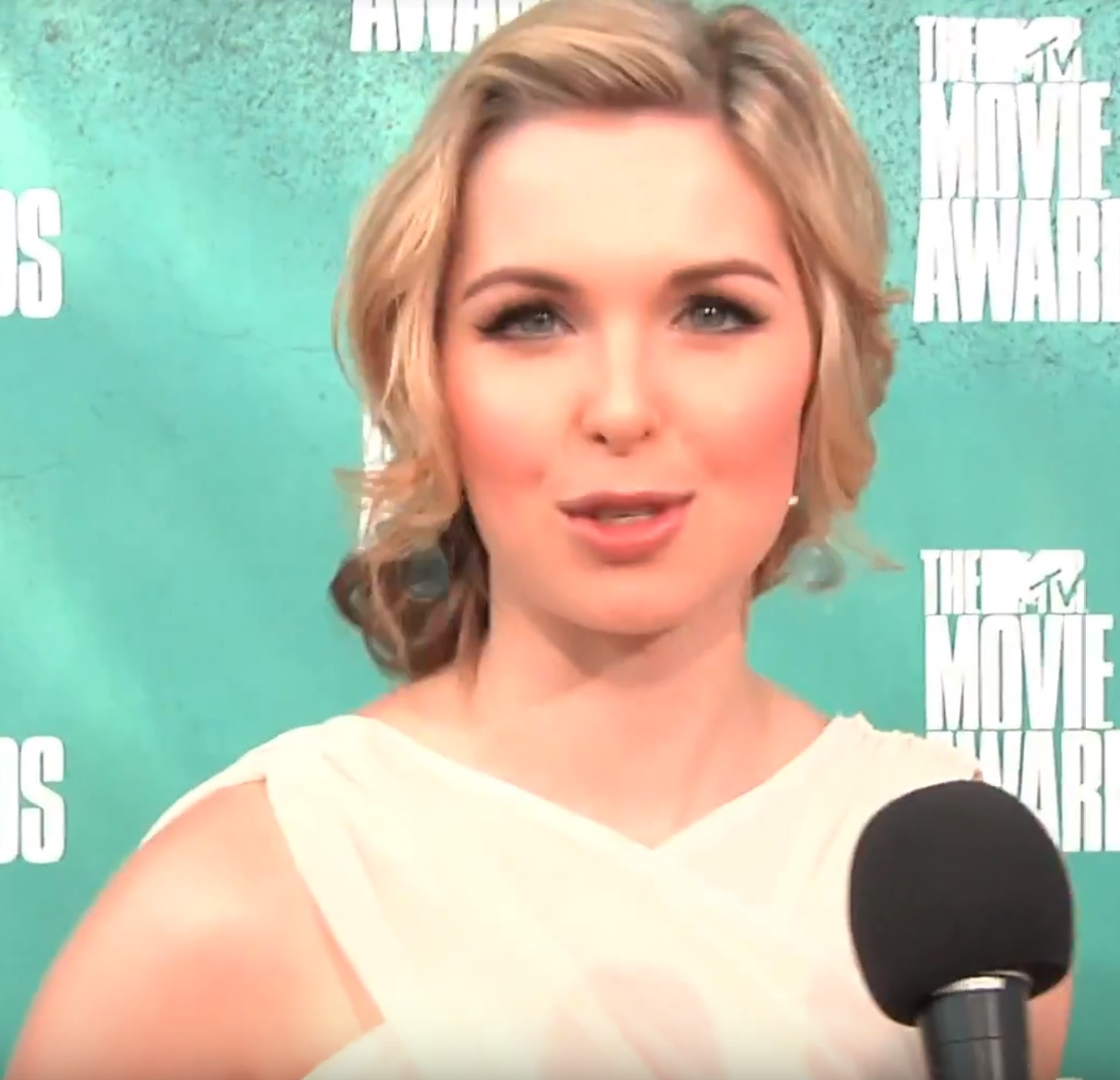
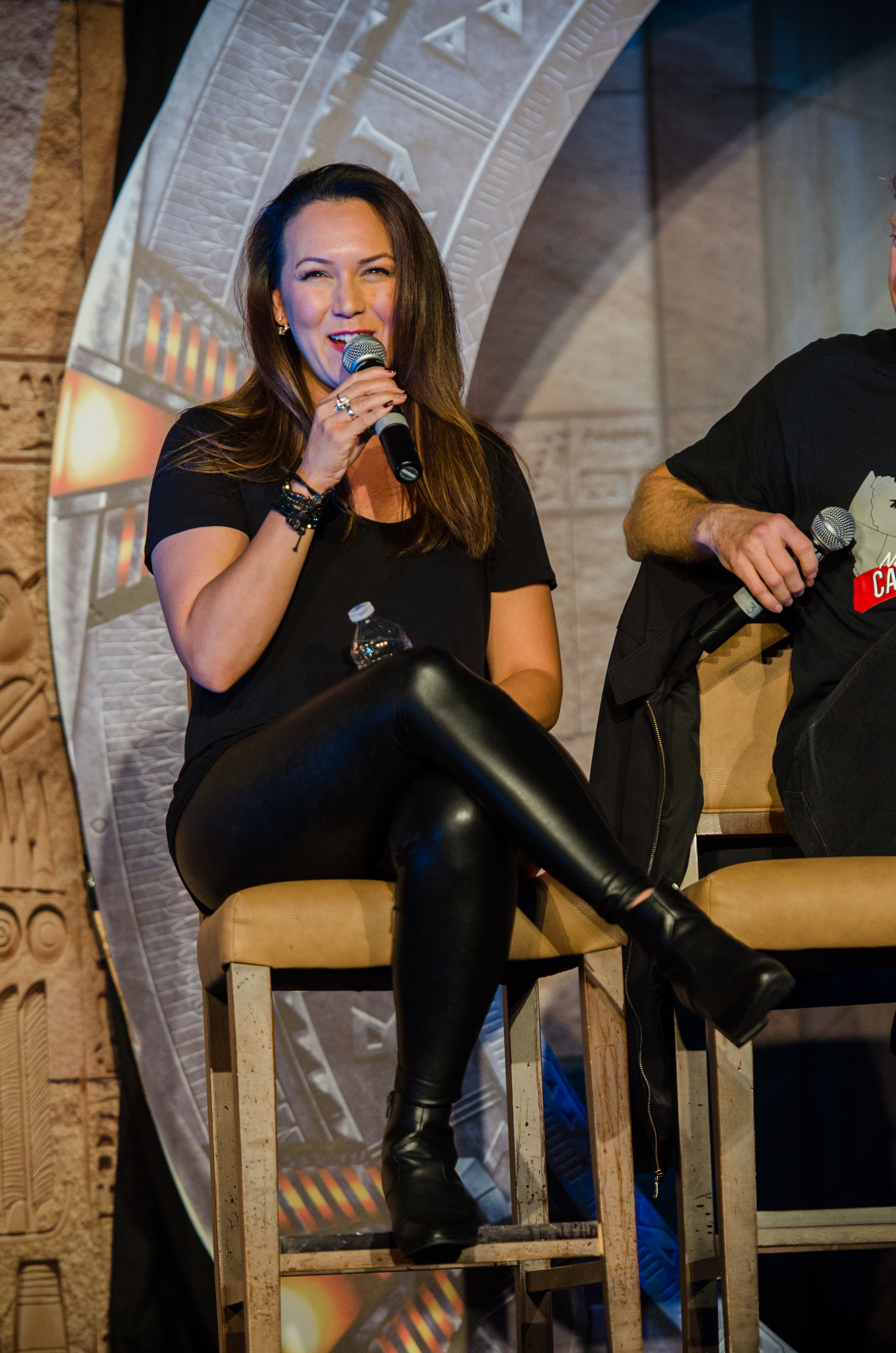
Top row: Jolene Blalock (left), Christine Adams (right) respectively play the roles of Ishta and Mala.
Bottom row: Kirsten Zien (left) and Simone Bailly respectively play the roles of Nesa and Ka'lel.

Jolene Blalock portrays the character of Ishta, the leader of the Hak'tyl and Priestess of the Goa'uld System Lord Moloc. The character was written by Judge with actress Blalock in mind, although Judge didn't believe that Blalock would actually be willing or able. When casting the role, Victoria Pratt was also considered for the part. When creating the part, Judge's main aim was to try write a strong Jaffa character and tried not to think about what gender they would be. Blalock would later return in the season 8 episode "Sacrifices". Other members of the Hak'tyl include Christine Adams as Mala, Kathleen Duborg as Neith, Kirsten Zien as Nesa and Simone Bailly in the part of Ka'lel. Bailly believed her character would only appear in one episode, but she later reprised the part in season 8 and then recurred in season 9 and 10, with the character eventually becoming the representative of the Hak'tyl on the Free Jaffa High Council. Bailly, who maintained relationships with the show's creative team after SG-1 ended was invited to appear as the character of Lincoln in Stargate Universe. Elizabeth Weinstein and Julie Hill also play Hak'tyl characters Emta and Ginra, as does Nikki Smook, partner of producer Michael Greenburg, who plays the part of Nictal. Greenburg asked Smook to appear as she had equestrian experience, as production required a number of actors who could comfortably ride horses. Smook also previously appeared as the character Nikka in "Scorched Earth". Judge's at-the-time girlfriend also appears as a background member of the Hak'tyl. Nigel Vonas portrays the Jaffa, Ryk'l, and Teryl Rothery appears as recurring character Dr. Janet Fraiser.

=== Filming and post-production ===
For the Hak'tyl costumes, costume designer Christina McQuarrie fashioned the costumes to be "functional, but sexy too", opting for "a more elemental feel" and also deciding against the heavy use of chain mail that was typically featured on the Jaffa. Makeup artist Jan Newman highlighted the episode as being "a real treat" for the makeup team, in that they got to style "outrageous hair" that was "more feminine than our usual military stuff". When creating hair and makeup looks for the Hak'tyl, Newman later explained that they "customised each look to their dresses so that we had lots of pinning and braiding".

Filming the episode took place in May 2003, with Peter Woeste directing and Jim Menard as cinematographer. Woeste wanted the cinematography to have a romantic feel to it and largely utilised long-focus lenses, with frequent use of close-up shots. Robert C. Cooper wanted a relatively long and "convincing fight sequence" to feature in the episode, encouraging Woeste to try and push the boundaries on what the series could achieve. Stunt coordinator Dan Shea worked with Woeste and the performers to choreograph the scene, with actors Christopher Judge and Jolene Blalock ultimately doing over 50% of the performance themselves.

The episode was largely shot on a private location in Langley, British Columbia along the Canadian United States border. Shooting took place in May 2003, with production running two separate crews out of the same location, one for "Birthright" and the other for "Heroes". Although masquerading as two different worlds, the Stargate erected on location was used for both episodes, with "Birthright" director Peter Woeste shooting from one side and "Heroes" director Andy Mikita shooting from the other. The episode's most prominent set, a Hak'tyl settlement, was constructed on the edge of a man-made lake. The wet weather conditions meant that production had trouble getting the 5 tonnes of set dressing to the location and therefore had to construct a temporary road leading to the set. Production designer Bridget McQuire's trip across Indonesia played influence on the Hak'tyl settlement, with Sumatran architecture in particular prompting the design of the Hak'tyl structures. Tent-like structures on wooden platforms were built around the lake, with a tent also constructed in the studio for interior shots. Production accidentally forgot to construct the studio tent on a wooden platform, meaning that people entering and exiting didn't entirely match in the finished episode. A wooden fishing raft was constructed and moored on the lake to further the idea that the Hak-tyl were a self-sufficient people, however could not be used during filming as the proper health and safety had not been put in place.

As well as regular series composer Joel Goldsmith, Kevin Kiner also contributed to the score, with this being his final input to the show.

== Release ==
=== Broadcast and ratings ===
"Birthright" was first broadcast on August 15, 2003 on the Sci-Fi Channel in the United States. The episode's broadcast and ratings were affected by the Northeast blackout of 2003, but still reportedly achieved a 1.5 Nielsen rating, viewed by some 1.2 million households. In the United Kingdom, the episode was first broadcast on December 1, 2003 on Sky One. The broadcast was Sky One's sixth most popular show that week, with 680,000 viewers. In Canada, the channel Space first aired "Birthright" on November 11, 2004.

=== Reception ===
Writing for SFX, Jayne Dearsley awarded the episode 3 out of 5 stars, calling it as an "interesting episode full of nice performances, with a cool fight scene". Dearsley praised Blalock "as being a great match for our brooding Jaffa hero", pointing out that "Christopher Judge writes an episode of Stargate in which he gets to snog Jolene Blalock", joking "you can't blame the guy for wanting Teal'c to get his end away for once". The reviewer was however critical that "all the women have the usual American TV-approved plucked eyebrows and perfect make-up, despite living in a forest". Jan Vincent-Rudzki for TV Zone negatively received the episode, describing it as "lots of posturing, pouting, fighting and taking illogical points of view, with a few I am a warrior thrown in" commenting that it "fails to be at all interesting". Vincent-Rudzki was mostly critical of Jolene Blalock, describing her as "a lady who cannot be said to have a particularly large build, and in trying to be a stern monotone Jaffa women, she manages to seem more like a Vulcan" as well as criticising a lack of "power" from the character. The reviewer awarded the episode 3 out of 10.

Writing for About.com, Julia Houston called the premise "familiar, but still quite fun", writing that whilst the episode was "a story every new sci-fi writer comes up with while they're getting their ya-yas out", writer Christopher Judge "does use a few professional tricks". The writer remarked "This is the Amazon Women scenario as complete male wish-fulfillment. The women warriors are beautiful, strong, sexual, and -- most importantly -- in need of salvation", drawing comparisons to the 1987 film Amazon Women on the Moon. Houston observed that whilst Judge was clearly inexperienced as a writer, he showed a strong audience understanding by having Jack and Daniel recognise and joke about the Amazons scenario right away.

Brigid Cherry for Dreamwatch positively received the episode, giving it 8 out of 10 believing that the "drama more than makes up for any lack of action". Cherry wrote "while this could have easily descended into sexist humour, it is saved by the taught and emotional scripting", praising writer Christopher Judge for giving his character of Teal'c a major role, without it feeling like an "ego job". Darren Rea for Sci-fi Online praised Blalock's performance, going on to write "this could have fallen flat on its face, but Blalock and Judge manage to turn this into an above average episode". Den of Geek's Juliette Harrisson gave a mixed response to the episode, believing it was "clearly motivated partly by giving him an opportunity for a love story with a gorgeous co-star", criticising the use of the Amazonian mythology as being the "hokiest of concepts". The writer did however praise Blalock's character of Ishta for "embodying a male fantasy of a woman who combines a maternal gentleness with formidable fighting skills is not easy, and Blalock does it well".

Analysing for PopMatters, Marco Lanzagorta considered SG-1 convincing the Hak'tyl to give up their dependence on the Goa'uld, and instead rely on a drug developed on Earth as an example of "intergalactic imperialism" "to impose contemporary U.S. ideologies on other cultures". The writer went on to argue "the series seems aware that such an attitude is troubling". Reviewing for Fansite Gateworld Alli Snow expressed that so far in season 7, "Birthright" was the episode he had "enjoyed" the most. Snow praised the writing, specifically the depth given to the characters of Ishta, Neith, and Mala, all of whom he quickly became invested in. The reviewer also appreciated Judge's performance as Teal'c, commenting that the episode "provided ample opportunity for Judge to sample a wide palate of emotions" arguing that "Perhaps not since "The Warrior" have we seen him so relaxed, or so verbose." Syfy Wire writer Lisa Granshaw called the episode "a bit cliche", however the author included Ishta in a list of characters they would most like to be explored in a spin-off series.

=== Home media ===
The episode was first released as part of the "Volume 34" region 2 DVD on March 29, 2004, along with episodes "Avenger 2.0" and both parts of "Evolution" and was the 2nd most popular DVD release that week in the United Kingdom. It was then released as part of the complete Season 7 boxsets on October 19, 2004 in region 1 and February 28, 2005 in region 2. The episode, along with the rest of season 7 were first made available digitally in January 2008 through iTunes and Amazon Unbox. The episode, along with every other episode of the series, was made available to stream for the first time through Netflix in the USA on August 15, 2010. Director Peter Woeste is joined by director of photography Jim Menard and set decorators Mark Davidson and Robert Davidson for the audio commentary of the episode. A deleted scene was posted on the Sci-Fi Channel's website after the episode aired, where Sam comforts Janet following the loss of Mala.
