= Blood Angels =

Blood Angels may refer to

- An alternate name of Thralls (film), a 2004 horror film
- In the fictional setting of Warhammer 40,000, a Space Marines Chapter.

== See also ==
- Blutengel (Blood Angel), a German musical group
