= Lachlan Buchanan =

Australian actor (born 1987)

- Born: Lachlan Buchanan; 27 April 1987 (age 39); Melbourne, Australia
- Occupation: Actor
- Years active: 2006–present

Lachlan Buchanan is an Australian actor.

== Biography ==
Buchanan was born on 25 April 1987 in Australia and grew up in Maleny, Queensland. He attended Maleny State School and Matthew Flinders Anglican College. Buchanan acted in soap operas such as Home and Away. He has also acted in several films, with supporting roles in Arcadia Lost and All My Friends Are Leaving Brisbane, and as a lead in Newcastle.

Buchanan played Scott Mitchell in the first CMT sitcom Working Class, which premiered in January 2011.

He is an experienced surfer, and did half of his surfing scenes in Newcastle himself. He is fluent in French. As of 2010, he is based in Los Angeles.

In 2015, Buchanan starred in the low-budget film Muck, released in March. Buchanan was cast in the role of Kyle Abbott on the American soap opera The Young and the Restless. His first scene aired on 25 February 2015.

In January 2016, Buchanan was announced to guest-star in one episode of MTV's Teen Wolf, as Henri Argent. Henri is a recluse who lives in a forest grove and has been described as "wise but guarded". Being an Argent, Henri is said to know a lot about the supernatural world.

In an April 2020 interview with Queerty, Buchanan identified himself as a queer man.

== Filmography ==
Film
Year	Film	Role	Notes
2007	All My Friends Are Leaving Brisbane	Wedding Guest	
2008	Newcastle	Jesse	
2009	Arcadia Lost	Raffi	
2014	Behaving Badly	Billy Bender	
2015	Muck	Troit	
2015	Some Freaks	Patrick	
2019	Ford V Ferrari	Celebrity MC - Cloverfield	

Television
Year	Title	Role	Notes
2006	Bianca		
2007	Mortified	Dan – Pizza Boy	1 episode
2008	Home and Away	Pat Jenkins	4 episodes
2008	Blue Water High	Charley Prince	26 episodes
2008	Out of the Blue	Cooper	1 episode
2010	Hung	Paul Kolsenovic	2 episodes
2010	No Ordinary Family	Chad Claremont	2 episodes
2011	Working Class	Scott Mitchell	12 episodes
2012	Pretty Little Liars	Duncan Albert	2 episodes
2012	Jimmy Kimmel Live!	Male Tribute	1 episode
2012	Jessie	Jordan Taylor	Episode: "Star Wars"
2013	Castle	Stone Gower	Episode: "Reality Star Struck"
2013	NCIS: Los Angeles	Brett	2 episodes
2015–2016	The Young and the Restless	Kyle Abbott	Contract role until October 2015; Recurring in 2016
2016	Teen Wolf	Henri Argent	1 episode "The Maid of Gévaudan"
2016	Criminal Minds	Stuart Barker	1 episode "Taboo"
2016	NCIS	Navy Petty Officer James Muldoon	Episode: "After Hours"
2016	Fuller House	Sean	Episode: "Ramona's Not-So-Epic First Kiss"
2020–2024	Station 19	Emmett Dixon	31 episodes
2020–2022	Dynasty	Ryan	6 episodes
2023	The Rookie: Feds	Chance	Episode: "Out for Blood"
2023	Wellmania	Gaz Healy	Main role; 8 episodes
