= Avenger 2.0 =

- Stargate SG-1 episode
- Episode no.: Season 7 Episode 9
- Directed by: Martin Wood
- Written by: Joseph Mallozzi and Paul Mullie
- Cinematography by: Jim Menard
- Editing by: Brad Rines
- Production code: P275
- Original air date: August 8, 2003

Guest appearances
- Patrick McKenna as Dr. Jay Felger; Jocelyne Loewen as Chloe Angstrom

Episode chronology
← Previous "Space Race"	Next → "Birthright"
- Stargate SG-1 (season 7)

"Avenger 2.0" is the 9th episode from the seventh season of military science fiction adventure television show Stargate SG-1 and is the 141st overall. It was first broadcast on August 8, 2003, on the Sci-Fi Channel. The episode was written by duo Joseph Mallozzi and Paul Mullie, and was directed by Martin Wood.

In this episode, Dr. Jay Felger (Patrick McKenna), a scientist at Stargate Command, is struggling to produce anything of merit and his future with the program is called into question by General George Hammond (Don S. Davis). In a desperate attempt to keep his job, Felger presents Major Samantha Carter (Amanda Tapping) with a computer program he calls Avenger, which he believes they will be able to use in order to permanently disable any Stargate of their choosing.

The episode is a sequel to the season six episode "The Other Guys" which was written by Damian Kindler and directed by Wood. Written as season seven's comedy episode, it focuses predominantly on Amanda Tapping's character Samantha Carter, along with Patrick McKenna, who reprises his role as Dr. Jay Felger. They are joined by Jocelyne Loewen who portrays Chloe Angstrom.

== Plot ==
Dr. Jay Felger (Patrick McKenna) and his assistant, Chloe (Jocelyne Loewen) are working in their lab at Stargate Command, when Jack O'Neill (Richard Dean Anderson) and Samantha Carter (Amanda Tapping) arrive to see a demonstration of weapon Felger's been working on. When Felger activates the weapon, it causes power around the base to fail. Afterwards General George Hammond (Don S. Davis), who is unimpressed by Felger's work over the previous six months, questions his future at Stargate Command. A desperate Felger tells Hammond he's working on something big, but Hammond is skeptical and gives him just 24 hours to present something of merit. Back in their lab, Felger tells Chloe what's transpired and decides that he'll pitch an invention he calls Avenger, despite Chloe's warnings that it isn't finished.

The next day he presents his idea to Carter; a computer program that they can use to disable any Stargate. Recognising the idea's potential, Carter sells it to Hammond, who agrees to allow Felger to develop it with Carter. Their program, Avenger, is soon ready to be tested, with a Gate on a planet controlled by the Goa'uld system lord Ba'al selected as the target. After they deploy the program, O'Neill and Teal'c (Christopher Judge), who are off world, fail to check in with Stargate Command at the scheduled time. Stargate Command dials the gate of the planet O'Neill and Teal'c are on and they make contact with the pair who explain to Hammond and Carter that they are unable to dial the Stargate on their world and are therefore stuck, with O'Neill assuming that it's been caused by Felger's program. This is soon confirmed by their allies in the Tok'ra, who inform them that the entire network is being affected and that Stargate Command's Gate is the only one seemingly still working.

Carter deduces from the reports that Avenger appears to have caused a 'periodic correlative update' in the Stargate system, whereby all Stargate's update and compensate for stellar drift, something thought to only occur once ever 200 years and she theorises that this is somehow distributing the virus around the network. Carter believes that Stargate Command remains unaffected as they do not use a traditional Dial-Home Device with the Earth Stargate, but instead use their own contraption. Stargate Command does its best to bring its off-world personnel back to Earth, but O'Neill and Teal'c remain stuck and now under attack from enemy forces, whilst they also make contact with Daniel Jackson (Michael Shanks) who is also stuck on another planet where the rising floods threaten him and the inhabitants that he was helping relocate. Carter, Chloe and Felger try to find a solution and soon learn that Ba'al is benefiting from the chaos by using his large fleet of ships to attack other Goa'uld system lords. After failing to fix the situation, Felger slips out of Stargate Command. Carter goes to find him and talks him into coming back and they conclude that the Stargate on the planet controlled by Ba'al which they originally targeted with the virus might hold the key to fixing the problem. Knowing that they will be stuck off-world if they cannot fix the Stargate, Carter and Felger volunteer to go to the planet, despite it being controlled by the forces of Ba'al.

Both Carter and Felger leave for the planet, prepped with an anti-virus program which they believe will undo the damage caused by Avenger. When they start to work on the Dial-Home Device, Felger soon discovers that Avenger has been tampered with and the pair conclude that it must have been the work of Ba'al, since he gained most when the gate system went offline. As it's no longer Avenger they're working with, Felger has to come up with a whole new program and to make matters worse, one of Ba'al's Jaffa patrol's arrives at the Stargate. Carter fends off the patrol, but the Jaffa call for reinforcements who soon press their attack against Carter and Felger. As the pair are cornered and running out of options, a Goa'uld Alkesh ship descends upon the pair, but much to their surprise begins attacking Ba'al's Jaffa, who retreat. The Alkesh ring transport activates and O'Neill and Teal'c emerge, having stolen the ship from their attackers and decided to come and help. Felger is then able to solve the problem and they return to Stargate Command.

== Production ==
=== Development and writing ===
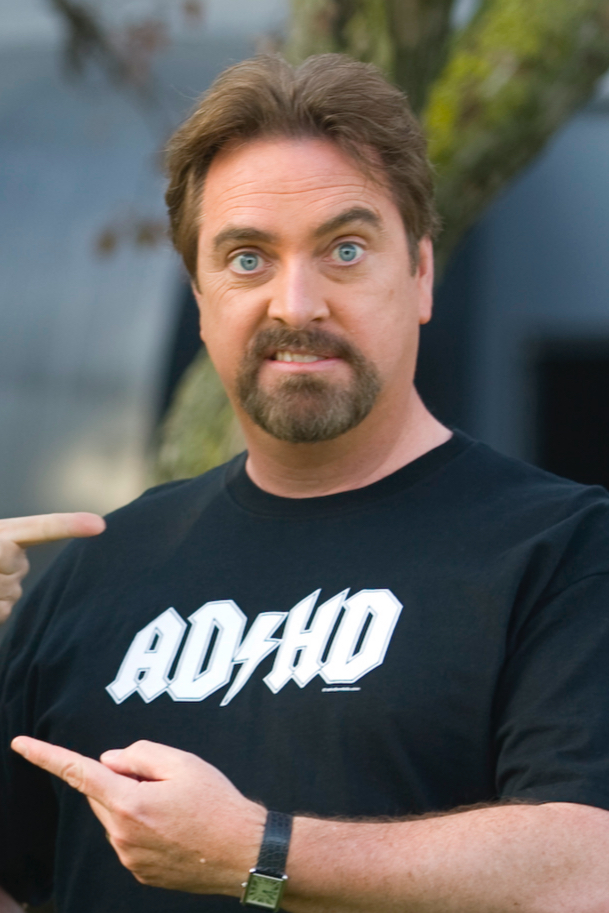
Patrick McKenna returns as Dr. Jay Felger, having previously appeared in the previous season's episode "The Other Guys".

After his introduction in the season six episode "The Other Guys", the SG-1 writers were keen to bring back the character Dr. Jay Felger, portrayed by Patrick McKenna. Executive producer Robert C. Cooper conceived "the notion of a virus that can potentially target and shut down specific gates", which he married with bringing back Felger. Cooper observed that in "The Other Guys", Felger was "so over the top and wacky" that coming up for a reason for him to return "was really about coming up with something even more spectacularly stupid for him to have done" which is how the writers arrived at the character seemingly braking the entire Stargate system, commenting that it was "the only thing we could possibly imagine being big enough". Although Cooper came up with the story, it was assigned to Joseph Mallozzi and Paul Mullie to flesh out and script. Writer of "The Other Guys" Damian Kindler, who created Felger, had hoped to write it, jesting "at first I was like, 'I created Felger! I want to write Felger!' But then, when I stopped whining, I thought, 'Well this is exciting. I want to see how they write him, what their take is'".

Mullie and Mallozzi worked on their outline for what they originally referred to as "Felger Gate Screw-Up" in January 2003, with Mallozzi revealing "It takes us only a couple of days to hammer out a tease and five solid acts". Robert C. Cooper then pointed out that their "first act would make a better second act break", so the writing duo reworked their story accordingly. In their script, Mallozzi included "a salute to one of my own high school teachers, Mr. Hoffan", having Felger refer to Mallozzi's former science teacher in a scene with Chloe. At one stage, it was written that Felger would be still be living with his mother, however it was changed to him instead living alone. The writing duo struggled to come up with a title for the episode, with "System Crash", "Domino Effect", "Deadlock", "Paralysis", "Gridlock", and "No Way Back" all being considered and rejected. According to Mallozzi "The titles grow increasingly ridiculous, bearing little if any relation to the story" with "Flashpoint", "Dark Gambit" and "Twilight of Nevermore" all being rejected before Robert C. Cooper suggested "Avenger 2.0". Mallozzi noted that "Avenger 2.0" was one of the last episodes that "Paul Mullie, and I truly co-wrote", with the pair instead doing most of their work separately in for future episodes.

A comic book was created for the story, The Amazing Avenger, which in the episode would inspire Felger's naming of the virus. Director Martin Wood noted that naming the virus was particularly difficult for their legal department, as so many superhero-like names were copyrighted. Art director James Robbins designed and illustrated the comic, with the titular character based on director Martin Wood's likeness. The comic book appears again in the Stargate Atlantis episode "The Gift" and SG-1 episode "Citizen Joe". It was originally written that Felger would be painting Warhammer figures, however the Warhammer publisher refused permission, believing that it "would depict the game in an unfavorable light" according to Mallozzi. Instead they opted to give Felger his own custom-made Stargate-maquette, along with his own homemade SG-1 figures.

=== Cast and filming ===
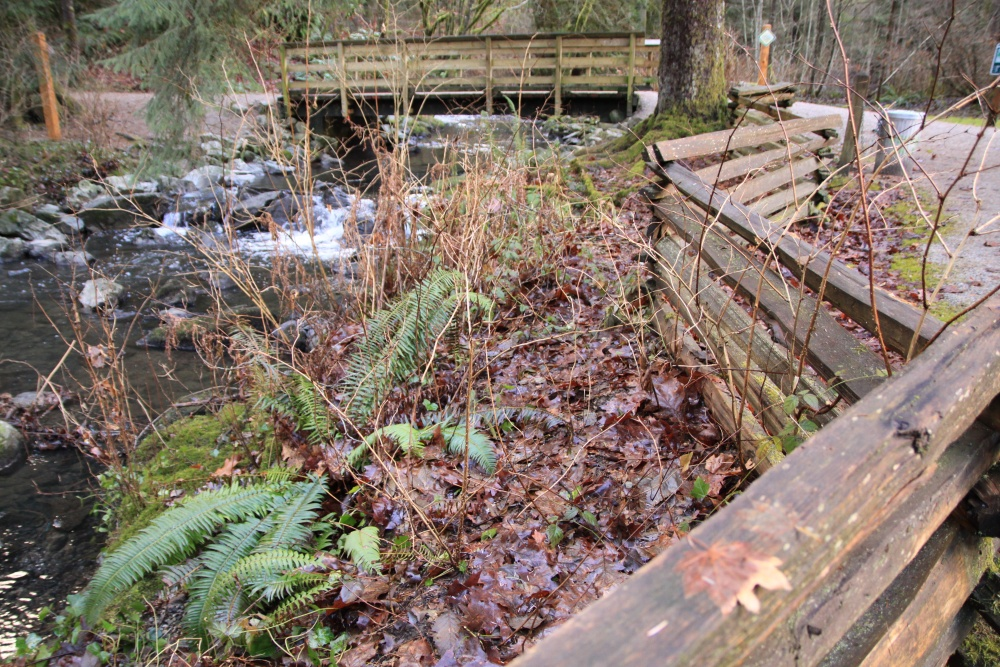
A bridge at Tynehead Regional Park, Surrey, British Columbia was used for a scene between Felger and Carter.

Patrick McKenna reprises his role as Dr. Jay Felger, whilst Jocelyne Loewen portrays his lab assistant, Chloe Angstrom. Gary Jones and Dan Shea reprise their roles as Technician and Siler, whilst director Martin Wood also cameos as both Stargate Command technician and a Tok'ra operative who can be heard in an audio-only communication to Stargate Command. Paul Lazenby, Terrance Leigh, Jim Dunn, Terrance Morris, Christopher Sayour, James Michaelopolis, Tony Morelli, Ron Robinson, Chris Lozanski, Sylvester Stuart all portray Jaffa soldiers. John Billingsley, who portrayed Coombs in "The Other Guys" commented that he "was actually very sorry that they didn't bring my character back" in the episode, noting that the shows producers were unable to approach him as he was in the middle of filming Star Trek: Enterprise.

"Avenger 2.0" was directed by Martin Wood, with Jim Menard as director of photography. Filming took place in early May 2003, with production filming both "Avenger 2.0" and "Enemy Mine" concurrently. Tynehead Regional Park in Surrey, British Columbia was used for the scene where Jay Felger goes to 'feed the ducks', and with limited sunlight left in the day had to use a three-camera setup to quickly cover the scene. Felger's apartment was filmed at the Accent Inn across the road from The Bridge Studios in Burnaby, British Columbia. Wood imagined Felger's research laboratory as being deep in a part of Stargate Command that had not previously been seen onscreen, and therefore reconfigured the Stargate Command set walls in a new way for both his laboratory and the surrounding corridors. Wood wanted Felger to be "obtrusive" in his scenes and therefore looked to position McKenna in-front of or overly close to other characters. McKenna, along with the other actors were given room to improvise, with McKenna taking it upon himself to pretend to be on the phone to Simon Coombs from "The Other Guys" in the scene where his mother phones him at work. Wood felt that in "The Other Guys", the comedy came from both Coombs and Felger being "clowns", but in "Avenger 2.0" directed Amanda Tapping to play the straight man to contrast Felger's behaviour.

Due to the Iraq War, there was a shortage of the blank casing used in the FN P90 weapon that was often used in the show. Filming the episode marked the first time which Amanda Tapping's character Major Samantha Carter would instead be using a new custom built firearm, an amalgamation of three different weapons, known as the 'Carter Special'. In the battle scene, Tapping had a number of issues, firstly knocking over the styrofoam ruins, and then struggling to run backwards whilst firing her new weapon and then reload. Tapping later recalled struggled to insert the gun magazine, "I finally jammed in on so hard that I exploded the clip and all these shells went flying. I turned to Patrick McKenna and I said, 'I'm sorry. I'm Stargate Barbie and we're going to die.'" In post-production, Mallozzi noted that they had "some terrific outtakes" from the episode. Amongst the scenes that were shortened included the battle-sequence against Ba'al's Jaffa, with shots of Carter grenading their attackers being cut. The CGI shots of the Goa'uld Alkesh were taken from "The Other Guys" to save money.

=== Cultural references ===
Jack O'Neill asks Felger and Chloe if the weapon they've created is a Phaser, with Chloe replying that it's "more like a Photon torpedo" which are both weapons in the Star Trek franchise. Felger compares himself and Carter to Butch Cassidy and the Sundance Kid, whilst when the enemy Jaffa troops appear Carter responds to Felger saying "think Bolivia" in reference to the Bolivian army who kill Butch & Sundance in the film Butch Cassidy and the Sundance Kid. Whilst preparing to go through the Stargate with Major Carter, Felger packs Duct tape into his bag, a reference to The Red Green Show which actor Patrick McKenna portrays the character of Harold. O'Neill calls Felger "Folger", which is a coffee brand in the United States and Canada.

== Release ==
=== Broadcast and ratings ===
The episode was first broadcast on August 8, 2003, on the Sci-Fi Channel in the United States, and reportedly earned a Nielson rating of 1.8. In the United Kingdom the episode was first shown on Sky One on November 24, 2003, attracting 650,000 viewers. The episode was syndicated onto Channel 4 on October 31, 2004, and was viewed by 1.687 million households. In Canada, the episode was first shown on Space on November 4, 2004.

=== Reception ===
Brigid Cherry for Dreamwatch enjoyed the episode, writing "While it doesn't reach the heights of Wormhole Extreme (well, what would?) it's a pretty decent and fun romp" and awarded it 6 out of 10. Julia Houston for About.com wrote "It's cute and chuckle-worthy, but I find myself wishing for something with more substance". Houston felt that "the tone of the episode is a little too uneven" and was of the opinion that "Felger's idea really is a great one and should be used in a more serious episode". Jan Vincent-Rudzki for TV Zone heavily criticised the episode awarding it just 3 out of 10, proclaiming "it isn't funny, just irritating". Keith R.A. DeCandido for Tor.com also reacted poorly to the episode, stating it "shows that “The Other Guys” mostly worked because of John Billingsley, whose absence is keenly felt in this unfunny disaster". TV Guide made the episode one of their 'top picks' for the week.

Response from contributors on fansite Gateworld.net was divided, with contributor Alli Snow calling it a "fun frolic", praising the episodes humour, whilst another contributor, Lex panned the episode writing "Felger The Geek just wasn't up to the task of providing an entertaining hour of usually intelligent television". Darren Rea for Sci-fi Online awarded the episode 9 out of 10 writing "This episode proves, once again, that when SG-1 does comedy it knows how to pull out all the stops." Co-writer of the episode, Joseph Mallozzi reflected on the episode, writing "it's one of those episodes you wish you could do-over".

=== Home media ===
The episode was first released as part of the "Volume 34" region 2 DVD on March 29, 2004, along with episodes "Birthright" and both parts of "Evolution" and was the 2nd most popular DVD release that week in the United Kingdom. It was then released as part of the complete Season 7 boxsets on October 19, 2004, in region 1 and February 28, 2005, in region 2. The episode, along with the rest of season 7 were first made available digitally in January 2008 through iTunes and Amazon Unbox. The episode, along with every other episode of the series, were made available to stream for the first time through Netflix in the USA on August 15, 2010. Direct Martin Wood is joined by actor Amanda Tapping for the audio commentary, whilst a behind the scenes of the episode "Directors Series" feature is also included home media sets.
