= Working Class (TV series) =

American television sitcom

- Genre: Comedy
- Created by: Jill Cargerman
- Starring: Melissa Peterman; Ed Asner; Steve Kazee; Patrick Fabian; Lachlan Buchanan; Courtney Merritt; Cameron Castaneda
- Country of origin: United States
- Original language: English
- No. of seasons: 1
- No. of episodes: 12

Production
- Executive producers: Jill Cargerman; Bryan Johnson; Brad Johnson; Bob Kusbit; Brian Philips
- Producers: Melissa Peterman; Darris Hatch; Brenda Hanes-Berg
- Cinematography: John Simmons; Jim Roberson
- Editors: John Doutt; Jim Miley
- Camera setup: Multi-camera
- Running time: 20 minutes
- Production companies: Spoon Size Productions; The Film Syndicate

Original release
- Network: CMT
- Release: January 28 – April 1, 2011

Working Class is an American television sitcom created by Jill Cargerman, which premiered on CMT on January 28, 2011. The network ordered twelve episodes for the comedy, which was the first scripted series for the network.

On April 11, 2011, CMT cancelled Working Class after only one season, due to low ratings.

== Premise ==
According to a press release, "the ... series follows Carli Mitchell (Melissa Peterman), a single mom from a rough and tumble background, trying to give her three kids a better life by moving them to an upscale suburb. She quickly finds that making the transition to 'the good life' is harder than she thought."

== Critical reception ==
Brian Lowry of Variety panned the series, writing that "On paper, structuring a show around the recession must have felt bold...Ultimately, this is a comedy for people who find Jeff Foxworthy’s material too intellectually demanding."

== Cast ==
- Melissa Peterman as Carli Mitchell
- Ed Asner as Hank Greziak
- Steve Kazee as Nick Garrett
- Patrick Fabian as Rob Parker
- Lachlan Buchanan as Scott Mitchell
- Courtney Merritt as Pam Mitchell
- Cameron Castaneda as Will Mitchell

== Episodes ==
No.	Title	Directed by	Written by	Original release date	Prod. code	US viewers (millions)
1	"The Buddy System"	Rob Schiller	John Peaslee & Judd Pillot	January 28, 2011	101	1.2
Carli mistakenly hits on her boss while an old friend from high school comes back to fulfill a promise they made to marry each other if they don't find anyone else.
2	"Dental Claims"	Leonard R. Garner Jr.	Regina Y. Hicks	January 28, 2011	102	1.2
3	"Sugar Mama"	Rob Schiller	Bill Daly	February 4, 2011	103	N/A
Carli's ex-husband visits, bringing gifts for the children. But unbeknownst to Carli, he found a replacement, Renee (Reba McEntire), leaving Carli as the black sheep.
4	"Eye for an Eye"	Steve Zuckerman	Bill Daly	February 11, 2011	104	N/A
5	"Lunch Lady"	Leonard R. Garner Jr.	Paul Ciancarelli & David DiPietro	February 18, 2011	105	N/A
Dot (Kathy Kinney) tells stories about workers and teachers at school.
6	"Pay Back"	Leonard R. Garner Jr.	John Peaslee & Judd Pillot	February 25, 2011	106	N/A
7	"The Dance"	Rob Schiller	Jill Cargerman	March 4, 2011	107	N/A
8	"Wine Pairing"	Lynn M. McCracken	Julie Ann Larson	March 11, 2011	108	N/A
9	"B-Day Invasion"	Lynn M. McCracken	Paul Ciancarelli & David DiPietro	March 18, 2011	109	N/A
10	"Medieval Woman"	Steve Zuckerman	John Peaslee & Judd Pillot	March 25, 2011	110	N/A
11	"Short, Then Sweet"	Steve Zuckerman	Jill Cargerman	April 1, 2011	111	N/A
12	"Hire Education"	Leonard R. Garner Jr.	Jill Cargerman	April 1, 2011	112	N/A
