= Muck (film) =

2015 film by Steve Wolsh

- Film poster
- Directed by: Steve Wolsh
- Written by: Steve Wolsh
- Produced by: Steve Wolsh
- Starring: Lachlan Buchanan; Puja Mohindra; Bryce Draper; Stephanie Danielson; Laura Jacobs; Grant Alan Ouzts; Lauren Francesca
- Cinematography: Michael Solidum
- Edited by: Jon Jorgensen
- Music by: Dan Marschak; Miles Senzaki
- Production company: WithAnO Productions
- Distributed by: Anchor Bay Entertainment
- Release date: March 13, 2015
- Running time: 90 Minutes
- Country: United States
- Language: English
- Budget: $250,000

Muck is a 2015 American comedy horror film written and directed by Steve Wolsh in his directorial debut. It stars Lachlan Buchanan, Puja Mohindra, Bryce Draper, Stephanie Danielson, Laura Jacobs, Grant Alan Ouzts, and Lauren Francesca, with cameo appearances from Jaclyn Swedberg and Kane Hodder. The film follows a group of friends who find themselves under attack by mysterious assailants. Funding for Muck was partially raised through a Kickstarter campaign that generated $266,325.

The film premiered on February 26, 2015, at The Playboy Mansion and received a limited theatrical release on March 13, followed by a video on demand release on March 17. After its release, another crowdfunding campaign was launched for a prequel, Muck: The Feast of St. Patrick. Filming was completed in 2017, but the prequel remains unreleased as of 2025.

== Plot ==
After narrowly escaping from an ancient burial ground, long forgotten and buried underneath the marshes of Cape Cod, a group of friends emerge from the thick, marshy darkness, tattered and bloody, lucky to be alive. They have already lost two of their friends in the marsh, presumably dead. They stumble upon an empty Cape Cod vacation house alongside the foggy marsh and break in to take shelter. Whatever was in the marsh is still after them and, soon after one of them goes for help, the rest of the group learns that the evil in the marsh is not the only thing that wants them dead. Something worse, something more savage, is lying in wait just outside the marsh, in the house. The unlucky travelers spend their St. Patrick's Day trapped between two evils, forcing them to fight, die, or go back the way they came.

== Cast ==
- Lachlan Buchanan as Troit
- Puja Mohindra as Chandi
- Bryce Draper as Noah
- Stephanie Danielson as Kylie
- Laura Jacobs as Desiree
- Grant Alan Ouzts as Billy J. Munch
- Lauren Francesca as Mia
- Jaclyn Swedberg as Terra
- Gia Skova as Victoria Cougar
- Kane Hodder as Grawesome Crutal

== Soundtrack ==
The Muck soundtrack features 20 original tracks and is a mixture of rock, blues, and country. The original score was composed by Dan Marschak and Miles Senzaki.

== Reception ==
Muck was widely panned by critics, who criticized the story, excessive sexual content, lack of scares, and tonal shifts between horror and comedy. One of the few positive reviews came from Ambush Bug at Ain't It Cool News, who wrote "About as subtle as a stripper in church, don't expect your brain to be stimulated, but other areas (specifically your guts and below) are bound to be rumbled when you wade through Muck."

On Rotten Tomatoes, the film has a 0% approval, based on 7 reviews.
