= Thralls (film) =

- Directed by: Ron Oliver
- Screenplay by: Lisa Morton; Brett Thompson
- Produced by: James Shavick; Kirk Shaw
- Starring: Lorenzo Lamas; Leah Cairns; Crystal Lowe; Lisa Marie Caruk
- Cinematography: David Pelletier
- Edited by: Charles Robichaud
- Music by: Peter Allen
- Release date: March 22, 2005
- Running time: 95 minutes
- Country: Canada
- Language: English

Thralls (also known as Blood Angels in Canada) is a 2005 direct-to-video comedy horror film directed by Ron Oliver and starring Lorenzo Lamas, Leah Cairns, Siri Baruc, Crystal Lowe, Lisa Marie Caruk, Sonya Salomaa, and Moneca Delain. It was written by Lisa Morton and Brett Thompson.

== Plot ==
The plot focuses on six women known as thralls, half-vampires who lack the ability to fly or turn their victims. The thralls are joined by Ashley (Baruc), the sister of one of the thralls, and together they attempt to escape from the control of Mr. Jones (Lamas), a centuries-old vampire with a henchman named Rennie. Leslie opens a dance club in Iowa, while waiting the arrival of her sister Ashley, who grew up in an abusive household. Her father dies of a heart attack, causing Ashley to live with her sister.

Leslie saves Ashley from a group of muggers, and drains one of them of his blood. At the club, a Transvestite threatens to expose the girls for what they really are. Ashley learns that Leslie and her friends are half-vampire. She thanks them for saving her life when she almost fell over a rail. They stole the Necronomicon to defeat Jones, who plans on taking over the world by unleashing Belial, a demon. It is said the Belial tried to make vampires in his own image, but it resulted in making them look human. It is also said that the ritual will begin on the winter solstice, which is the longest night of the year.

Ashley falls for Jim, a local who didn't believe her at first, while his cousin, Jeff, gets involved with Roxie, a D.J. Earlier, Jim saved Ashley from a thug that tried to have his way with her. Roxie drains Jeff of his blood, but doesn't kill him. Unknown to Leslie, Lean, her friend, is involved with Jones. Jones kills the cross dresser when he starts calling him Elvis, causing a panic in the club. After hearing of the plan, Ashley gets stabbed in the back by Rennie while trying to stop the both of them. Lean reveals to Leslie that Jones gave her money to open the dance club, so that the ritual will be complete.

Earlier, Jones tried to offer Ashley a chance at happiness, but she refused to become a full vampire. Roxie is killed by Lean, due to her interference with the ritual that will resurrect Belial. Lean also kills Buzz, her friend, by shooting her in the back with a silver bullet. With the ritual ruined, Lean begs for Jones to turn her into a full vampire, but tells her he lied, and that she is of no use to him.

Rennie, Jones' henchman, reveals his love to Lean, but both of them get staked through their hearts: Rennie has a stake pulled from his chest after Lean fell on him, causing her to die as a normal human. Ashley returns as a full vampire and with her sister's and Brigitte's help, they defeat him. They cut up Jones with a sword as a warning to any vampire that crosses their path. Jim decides to go with Ashley and the others to another city, while Jeff is offered a deal by Jones, now cut to pieces, to help him find the girls.

== Cast ==
Actor	Role
Lorenzo Lamas	Mr. Jones Moss
Leah Cairns	Leslie Harper
Siri Baruc	Ashley Harper
Fiona Scott	Roxie Ulmer
Moneca Delain	Briggitte Milligan
Sonya Salomaa	Lean McKinley
Crystal Lowe	Tanya Watner
Lisa Marie Caruk	Buzz Horton
Shawn Roberts	Jim Larter
Richard Ian Cox	Rennie Chrismenthen
Nigel Vonas	Cisco O'Bannon
Shaw Madson	Porter Gonzalez
Curtis Caravaggio	Cole
Kevan Ohtsji	"'Doughboy" Jeff Larter
Willy Taylor	Anesta Hornetz
Shaw Madson	Porter

== Production ==
During production, the film was originally titled Thralls but changed to Blood Angels. The screenplay was written by Lisa Morton and Brett Thompson and was revised by director Ron Oliver. According to Vince Yim in Fangoria, was Oliver changed much of their work with the basic concept remaining.

== Release ==
Blood Angeles was released direct-to-video on March 22, 2005.

== Reception ==
From contemporary reviews, an anonymous reviewer in Fangoria declared the film a "reasonably well-made production-wise and moves at a good clip, and I didn't have to watch it in three "shoot me now!" half-hour installments." The reviewer concluded that "after the end credits roll, if you were to ask yourself why anything in this [...] movie happened the way it did, you'd probably be stuck for answers."
