= Gia Skova =

Russian actress and model

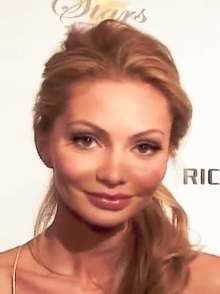
- Gia Skova in 2011
- Occupations: actress, model
- Years active: 2010
- Notable work: The Serpent

Gia Skova is a Bulgar Tatar Russian actress and model. She started acting in 2010 and produced and directed her first film, The Serpent in 2020.

== Biography ==
Skova started working as an actress at age 12 and starred in several television series.

At 15, Skova won the modeling contest Beauty of the Volga, which launched her professional modeling career. She was a model in Moscow by age 16, winning awards such as Ms. Saratov, Ms. FHM, Ms. Fashion Style and Ms. Great Volga. The Italian modeling agency Modus signed her and Skova worked in projects in Italy, France, Spain, and Asia. Still in her teens, Skova starred in several plays in Moscow, winning acting awards such as Best Theatrical Actress of Saratov, and 2009's Best Actress of Moscow Theater.

In 2011, Skova presented the photo galleries of All-Time Bar located in the center of the Russian capital with her photo shoot by photographer Ash Gupta in Spain. She has since been a cover girl or been featured in Vogue, InStyle, Vanity Fair, Esquire, GQ and Cosmopolitan, among others.

In 2012, Skova moved to the United States to continue her career as a model and actress.

In 2012 and 2013, Skova played in a sci-fi TV pilot called Starship Orion, scheduled for a 2014 release and she portrayed Victoria Cougar in the slasher film Muck.

In June 2021 she released the action film The Serpent, which she produced, directed and starred in.

== Comic Book Artist ==
Recently Skova created the comic book of Lucinda Kavski, an expansion of the universe of the Serpent in Comics.

== Filmography ==
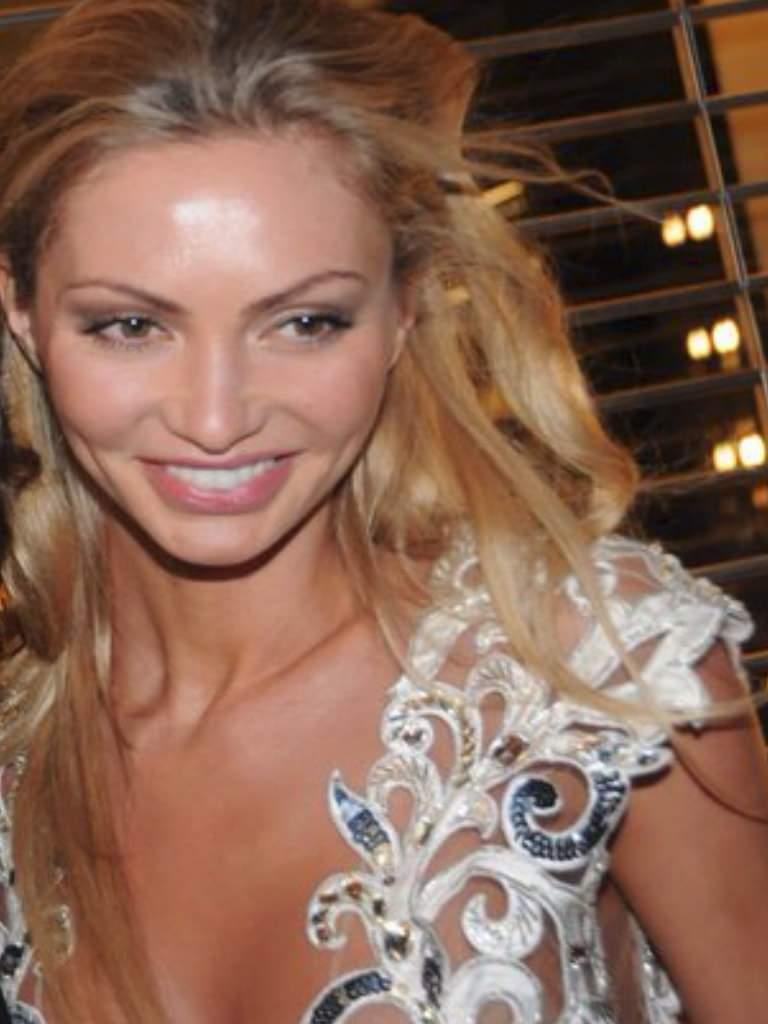
Skova in 2022

=== Film ===
Year	Film	Role
2010	Finding Beauty in the Best	Lady Roxy (short film)
2012	A Broken Code	Tia
2013	Assault on Wall Street	Charlotte
2015	Better that You Find This	The woman (short film)
2015	Muck	Victoria Cougar
2016	Breakout	Sasha
2016	Bleed for This	Duran Ring Girl
2017	Project Olimpus	General- Goddness
2017	Stranger in the Worldwide	Vanna (short film)
2017	Radical	-
2017	Joao o Maestro	Rita
2018	Bad Company	Gia
2018	Mara	Maria
2020	The Serpent	Lucinda Kavsky
2022	Summer Night, Winter Moon	Model
2022	Don't Ask	Charlotte
TBA	The Recipe (TV series)	Katiana
TBA	Skullenia (TV series)	Obsidia

=== TV series ===
Year	Name	Role	Production
2014	Starship Orion	Orion	Eola Entertainment
2007	Primadonna	-	Fenik-films
