= The Serpent (2020 film) =

2020 American action film

- Directed by: Gia Skova
- Written by: Gia Skova
- Produced by: Gia Skova
- Starring: Gia Skova; Travis Aaron Wide; Jason Burril; Akihiro Kitamura
- Cinematography: Lars Lindstrom
- Music by: Mikel Shae Prather
- Production company: Vallholl Production
- Distributed by: Vertical Limitis
- Release date: 2020
- Country: United States
- Language: English

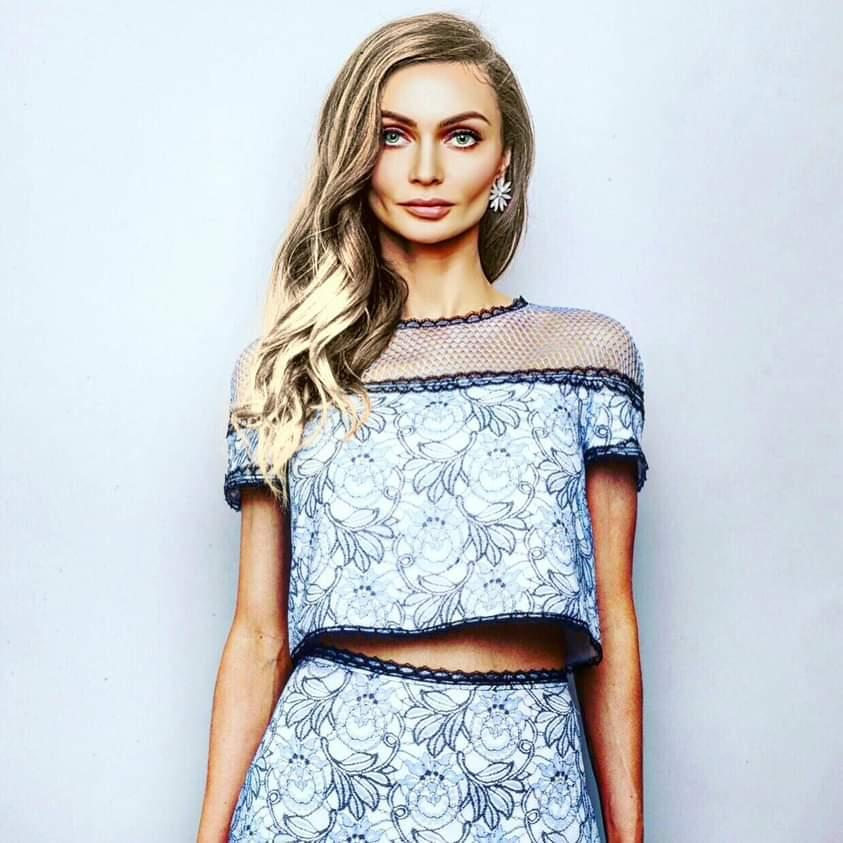
Gia Skova, director, producer, writer and lead actress

The Serpent is a 2020 American action film written, directed and produced by Gia Skova, who also stars in the film. It revolves around a CIA special agent who is set up by her own agency. The cast also includes Travis Aaron Wade, Craig Conway, Jason Scott Jenkins, Nigel Vonas and Jason Burril.

Critical response to the film was overwhelmingly negative.

== Plot ==
Lucinda Kavsky is a secret agent who is sent by the CIA to China as part of a biological experiment that could extend human life. However, on arrival she is trapped by the agency, who attempts to kill her. She escapes and uncovers an international plot. Seeking revenge and retribution she takes out each of her enemies.

== Cast ==
- Gia Skova as Lucinda Kavsky
- Travis Aaron Wade as Detective Franklin
- Nigel Vonas as Pierce
- Kristhoper Graves as Gerry
- Richard E. Wilson as CIA director Gozby
- Akihiro Kitamura as Dr. Lee
- Alexandra Tebano as Gozby's wife
- Violet Heath as Avy

== Production ==
The Serpent was partially filmed on location in Los Angeles. The film is Gia Skova's directorial debut.

== Release ==
The Serpent premiered in Dubai on January 4, 2020 at Novo Cinemas IMG but was only distributed in 2021 by Vertical Entertainment in Canada and the United States, where it premiered in June that year.

== Reception ==
A review at RogerEbert.com criticized the film's extreme lack of continuity and called it "a start-to-finish train wreck, a laughable piece of 'cinema' made by people who really have no business making movies." The review cited as an example a scene purportedly set in New York, but filmed in front of the Los Angeles Theater with the marquee bearing the building's name fully visible to the viewer and concluded, "If The Serpent proves anything, it's that Russian ladies can make lousy action movies too."

== Sequel and videogame announcement ==
Skova announced that there were plans for a sequel and that she had closed an agreement for the development of a videogame based on her film.

Recently Skova create the first number of Lucinda Kavski, a comic book series, and a new instalment of the Serpent Franchise
