= Nigel Vonas =

Canadian actor

Nigel Vonas is a film, television, and theatre actor, perhaps best known for his roles on Prison Break and Arrow. He completed his first year of computer engineering at the University of Toronto, before choosing arts over science.

== Career ==
He began his acting career in theatre, starring in several renowned American plays. The performances include his award-winning portrayal of Mike Downey, in the critically acclaimed play, Cherry Docs, by David Gow.

His film and television career began on Stargate SG-1, and he has since appeared on several other American TV series.

== Filmography ==
=== Film and television ===
Year	Title	Role	Notes
2003	Stargate SG-1	Ryk’l	Episode: "Birthright"
2004	Jake 2.0	Frank	Episode: "Get Foley"
2004	Smallville	Sniper	Episode: "Resurrection"
2004	Suite 48	Raoul	Video short
2004	The Chronicles of Riddick	Merc	
2005	Thralls	Cisco	
2006	Godiva’s	Bouncer	Episode: "The Bigger Man"
2006	The Gutter Diaries	Leather Jacket	
2008	Sanctuary	Cabal Team	Episode: "Fata Morgana"
2008	Ba'al	Shariff	
2008	Sweet Amerika	The Russian	
2008	The Harvest Project	Shawn	
2010	Pocho	Alex	Short film
2010	Rain Down	Murray	
2012	True Justice	Sadiq	Episode: "All In"
2014	Supernatural	Scarred Man	Episode: "Black"
2015	Under Construction	Dale Shepard	Unsold
2015	Olympus	Prisoner	Episode: "Pandora’s Tomb"
2015	Across the Water	Ryk’l	Short film
2015	Falling Skies	Morales	Episode: "Stalag 14th Virginia"
2015	Arrow	Walsh	3 episodes
2017	Sophie	Kyle	Short film
2017	Prison Break	Security Guard	Episode: "Kaniel Outis"
2020	The Serpent		
