= Kelly Carrington =

American model and fashion designer

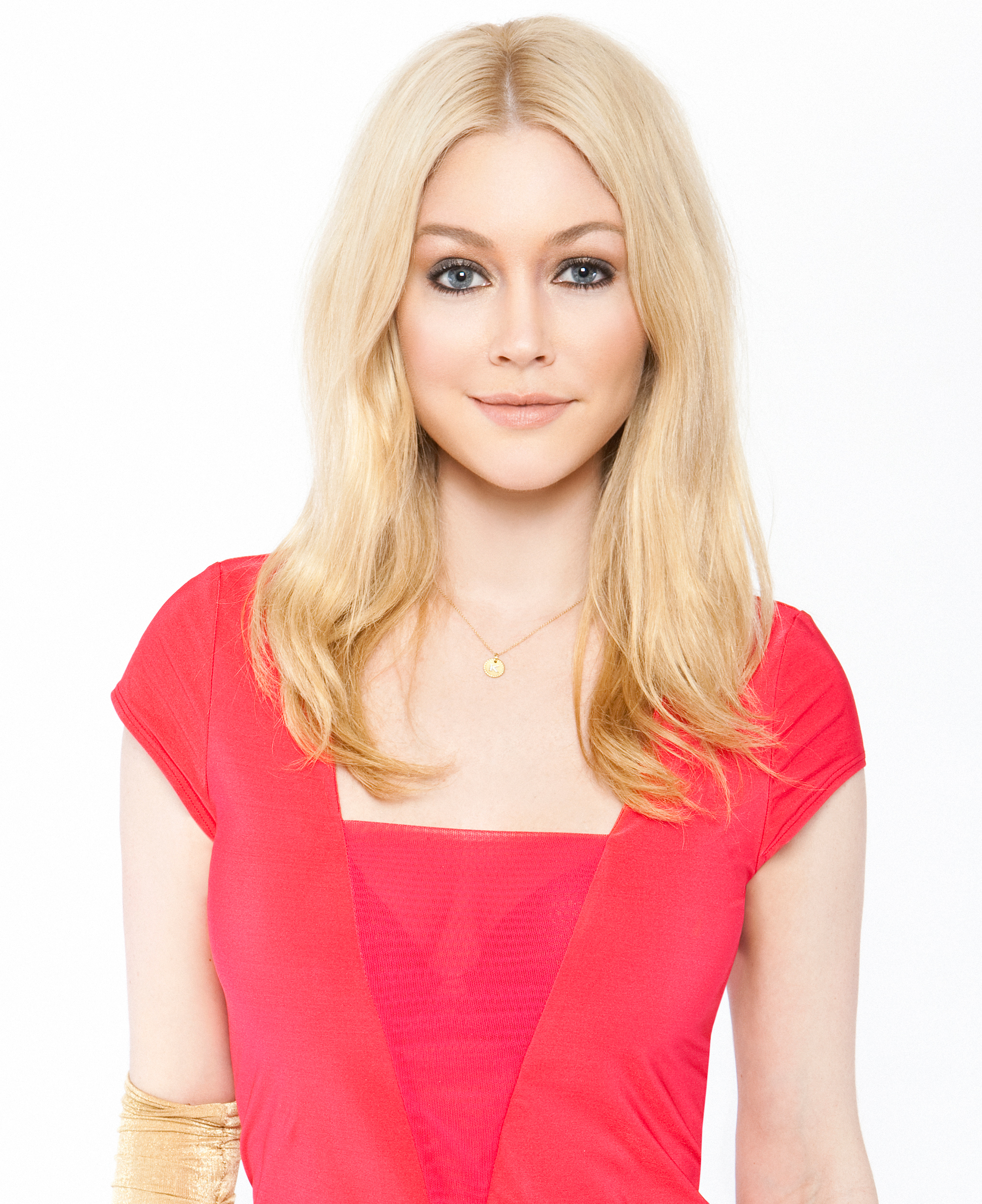
- Born: Kelly Hemberger; June 24, 1986 (age 40); White Plains, New York, U.S.
- Modeling information
- Height: 5 ft 5 in (1.65 m)

Playboy centerfold appearance
- October 2008
- Preceded by: Valerie Mason
- Succeeded by: Grace Kim

Personal details
- Height: 5 ft 5 in (1.65 m)

Kelly Carrington (née Hemberger; born June 24, 1986) is an American model and clothing designer. She is the founder and creative director of the luxury swimwear line, Éclairée. She was Playboy's October 2008 Playmate of the Month. She was also featured on the cover of the same issue. Her centerfold was photographed by Stephen Wayda.

At the time of her Playboy pictorial, she was attending the University of Florida. The magazine issue with her as a cover model had a headline advertising a pictorial of girls of the Big Ten Conference, which doesn't include the University of Florida. In a previous interview, she was misquoted as saying that she was on the cover because she was more attractive than any of the Big Ten women.

Sandra Nilsson	Michelle McLaughlin	Ida Ljungqvist	Regina Deutinger	A. J. Alexander	Juliette Fretté
Laura Croft	Kayla Collins	Valerie Mason	Kelly Carrington	Grace Kim	Jennifer and Natalie Jo Campbell
