= Heroes (Stargate SG-1) =

- Stargate SG-1 episodes
- Episode nos.: Season 7 Episodes 17 & 18
- Directed by: Andy Mikita
- Written by: Robert C. Cooper
- Cinematography by: Andrew Wilson
- Editing by: Eric Hill
- Production codes: P270 & P256
- Original air dates: February 13, 2004; February 20, 2004
- Running time: 44 minutes; 44 minutes

Guest appearances
- Saul Rubinek as Emmett Bregman; Teryl Rothery as Dr. Janet Fraiser; Robert Picardo as Richard Woolsey; Adam Baldwin as Col. Dave Dixon; Ronny Cox as Robert Kinsey; Dan Shea as Siler; Mitchell Kosterman as Col. Tom Rundell; Bill Dow as Dr. Lee; David Lewis as Cameron Balinsky; Julius Chapple as Airman Simon Wells; Christopher Redman as Airman Shep Wickenhouse; Tobias Slezak as Tech Sgt. Dale James; Gary Jones as Sgt. Walter Harriman

Episode chronology
← Previous "Death Knell"	Next → "Resurrection"
- Stargate SG-1 (season 7)

"Heroes" (Parts 1 and 2) are the seventeenth and eighteenth episodes from the seventh season of the science fiction television series Stargate SG-1. The episode was written by showrunner Robert C. Cooper and directed by frequent series director Andy Mikita. "Heroes" first aired on Sky One in the United Kingdom, with part 1 being shown on February 3, 2004, and part 2, being shown on February 10, 2004. In the United States, part 1 aired February 13 on and February 20 on Sci-fi Channel. Part 2 is the 150th episode of the show.

In this episode, the United States government has commissioned journalist Emmett Bregman (Saul Rubinek) to create a time-capsule video documentary, showing inner workings and goings-on within the top secret Stargate Command facility. Bregman's presence is met with resistance from many of the base personnel who are reluctant to appear in his film, with some exceptions, including Dr. Janet Fraiser (Teryl Rothery).

"Heroes" was originally imagined by Cooper as a single, inexpensive episode that would be shot entirely by the second-unit of photography, on the show's existing sets. After assembling a first cut that ran too long, Cooper and Mikita felt that instead of trimming the episode down, they should instead re-work it into a two-part arc. The story was reorganized, with new scenes written by Cooper and sporadically filmed by Mikita across a number of months in 2003.

The episodes are regarded by both fans and critics as being among the best of the show's ten-year run, with four Leo Awards nominations and one nomination for a Hugo Award.

== Plot ==
=== Part 1 ===
The President of the United States, nearing the end of his time in office, is concerned over how the public will react when the Stargate Program becomes public knowledge after he leaves office. Hoping that he will be able to put a positive spin on his association with the program, his office commissions Emmett Bregman (Saul Rubinek) to create a documentary on the personnel of Stargate Command and their activities. Whilst unenthusiastic about the idea, General Hammond (Don S. Davis) promises to follow the president's orders.

Bregman is given access to past mission reports and interviews members of Stargate Command. Bregman is dodged by Jack O'Neill (Richard Dean Anderson) who suggests the journalist try sending him a memo. Dr. Daniel Jackson (Michael Shanks) is unable to recall his time as an ascended being for the reporter and proceeds to toy with Bregman by running away, to see whether the film crew will follow him. Major Samantha Carter (Amanda Tapping) explains the science of the Stargate in great detail, only to be asked by Bregman if they can see the Gate spin. Teal'c (Christopher Judge) is almost entirely unwilling to give any responses to his questions.

Senator Kinsey (Ronny Cox), who is in the running to become the Vice President of the United States, uses the occasion in an attempt to coerce O'Neill into pledging his vote to Kinsey's party on-camera. As Bregman becomes frustrated by the resistance he is being met with, he interviews Dr. Janet Fraiser, becoming increasingly smitten as the two have lunch together.

SG-13 and SG-3 journey through the Stargate to explore a previously unvisited planet. After discovering an Ancient ruin, SG-13 encounters a Goa'uld probe that they disable. Believing there to be no further threat, the teams continue their exploration of the ruins and have the probe sent back to Stargate Command. Carter, Daniel and Teal'c determine that prior to its destruction, the probe communicated back to the Goa'uld.

On the alien planet, Senior Airman Simon Wells (Julius Chapple) is struck by weapons fire from ambushing Goa'uld ground forces. With Wells needing medical attention, another member of SG-13 retreats to the Gate to get help while the rest take up defensive positions. Back at Stargate Command, Bregman is held at bay as SG troops begin mobilizing for a mission to rescue SG-3 and SG-13.

=== Part 2 ===
As SG-3 and SG-13 are under attack, SG-1, SG-5 and SG-7 are sent in to back them up while Dr. Fraiser and her field team treat the wounded including Airman Wells. Colonel O'Neill takes a Goa'uld staff blast to the torso and falls to the ground. The embattled SG teams return to Earth and, while the camera crews are forced from the Gateroom, an unidentified individual stretched lifeless on a gurney is visible, concerning Bregman. Reports that there was a fatality during the mission filter through the SGC, piquing the interest of the reporter. With a member of Stargate Command dead, Agent Woolsey (Robert Picardo) is sent by the Intelligence Oversight Committee to investigate who is responsible, questioning the decisions of General Hammond, Dr. Jackson, and Major Carter. Bregman also tries to determine what happened.

An infuriated Bregman makes a strong stand about the importance of the media, especially with regard to a top secret program which is to be made public anyway. He highlights the importance of documenting the sacrifice and loss associated with war. After continued pressure, Dr. Jackson allows the reporter to view the tape he made of the mission. Bregman sees Dr. Fraiser tending to Wells and, almost immediately after stabilizing him for travel, taking a fatal staff blast to her torso.

As O'Neill recovers in the infirmary, Daniel visits Wells and his wife, where he is introduced to their newborn baby, who they have named Janet in Fraiser's honor. Stargate Command personnel gather for the memorial service, with Carter reading a eulogy of the names of those whom Fraiser saved. After Bregman shows Hammond his film, Hammond admits that he was wrong about the journalist's intentions, believing the documentary to be a fitting testimonial to those who have served and in some cases, given their lives for the Stargate Program and protection of Earth. Colonel O'Neill agrees to sit down and talk to Bregman.

== Production ==
=== Development ===
Robert C. Cooper's initial inspiration came from an episode of the television series M*A*S*H he had always enjoyed called "Yankee Doodle Doctor", which follows a documentary being made. Using the documentary premise, Cooper wanted to take a step back and examine "just how incredible" a feat the Stargate Program was, exploring the secrecy surrounding the project. Cooper wanted to examine the personnel involved, specifically tackling how the characters felt about their extraordinary jobs, where they were "essentially saving the world every week", something he believed they were doing without expectation of reward. Around the time Cooper was working on the story, the 2003 invasion of Iraq was also taking place. Although it was not Cooper's intent to make a commentary on the real world events, he felt that there was an almost inevitable bleed through to his story, especially how news reporters were embedded along with the military and how that affected both the actions of those involved and the subsequent coverage. Writer and producer Joseph Mallozzi described initial drafts of "Heroes" as "light-hearted documentary-style take on Stargate Command." As Cooper's script developed, Peter DeLuise suggested that one of the recurring characters should be killed off. Although he did not suggest who that should be, he recommended that it be a character the audience had feelings for. Cooper subsequently made the decision to kill off the recurring character of Dr. Janet Fraiser to further his examination of the characters and look at how they dealt with loss and sacrifice.

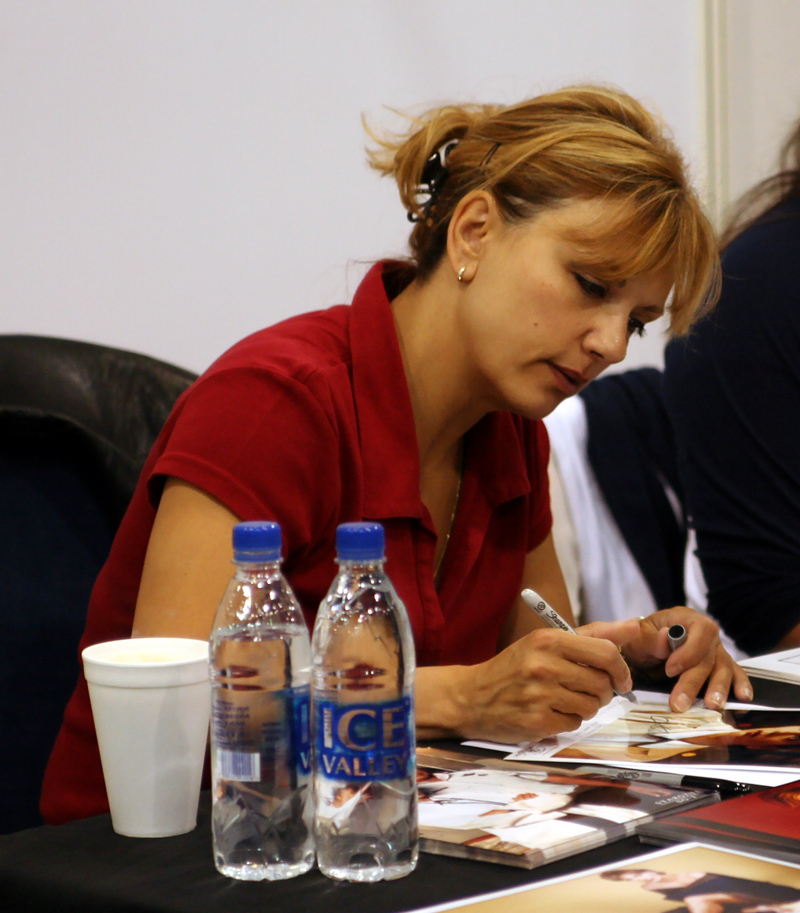
Teryl Rothery has portrayed Dr. Janet Fraiser since the season 1 episode "The Broca Divide."

There was heavy debate amongst the writing staff regarding Cooper's proposal to kill Dr. Fraiser off; not all the writers agreed with his decision. It was Cooper's belief that these characters, including Fraiser, were imagined as "living in a real world—they're living in a world we can identify with and this is the real military, this is the Air Force". He felt it was important that the show acknowledge the fact that both "in real life and on the show, people do die." Cooper also believed it would be "cheap" to introduce a new character for the episode only to kill them off, noting that Stargate SG-1 could not have "real jeopardy unless once in a while you prove that something is going to happen that has consequence". DeLuise also encouraged Cooper to not have the character "die and come back", as Daniel Jackson had, in order to give the show credibility. Cooper phoned Rothery in January 2003 to discuss production of the seventh season, breaking it to her that he planned to kill Fraiser off. Although Rothery was upset that her character was being killed off, she thought the story was "beautiful", believing it was a fitting way for her character to go.

As a gag, Cooper wrote a scene for Walter Harriman (Gary Jones) where the character would joke about Air Force Technicians playing Space Invaders on the computers in the Gateroom. This was a response to an earlier note Cooper had received from the United States Air Force, telling him that Air Force personnel would not play computer games whilst on active duty.

After the episode had been written, shot and edited, the abundance of additional material led to it being redeveloped into a two-part episode. This meant that Cooper had to write additional material. Cooper still had a clear beginning, middle and end to his story, which he wanted to preserve, and instead looked at expanding upon the existing story by introducing a new subplot, adding 35 pages to his script. The notion that Stargate Command's personnel were under investigation following the death of one of its personnel was already indicated in Cooper's original story, but he developed this into a fully-fledged subplot that would be interwoven throughout the finished episodes. This led to the introduction of the character of Richard Woolsey, who would be conducting the investigation. The Woolsey subplot was the turning point for Cooper in developing "Heroes" into two episodes, believing that the new subplot would complement the existing story, commenting that Bregman "is try[ing] to use freedoms and liberties that are supposedly afforded to the press, to get the true story about what's going on in the SGC and doing an investigation. Woolsey is doing another investigation that is in many ways attempting to crucify those same people." The production schedule and broadcast order had to be revised, as "Heroes" had originally been intended for broadcast amongst the first 10 episode of season seven.

After Saul Rubinek was cast, the actor in his discussions to Cooper felt as though the show was "missing an opportunity" to further the importance of the press. Rubinek encouraged Cooper to include a passionate speech for his character detailing how crucial freedom of the press, "true reporting and how important that is to a democratic society". Rubinek later recalled that Cooper was "very open" and seemingly appreciative of his contribution, whilst affirming it was still "all Robert Cooper" who was ultimately responsible.

=== Cast ===
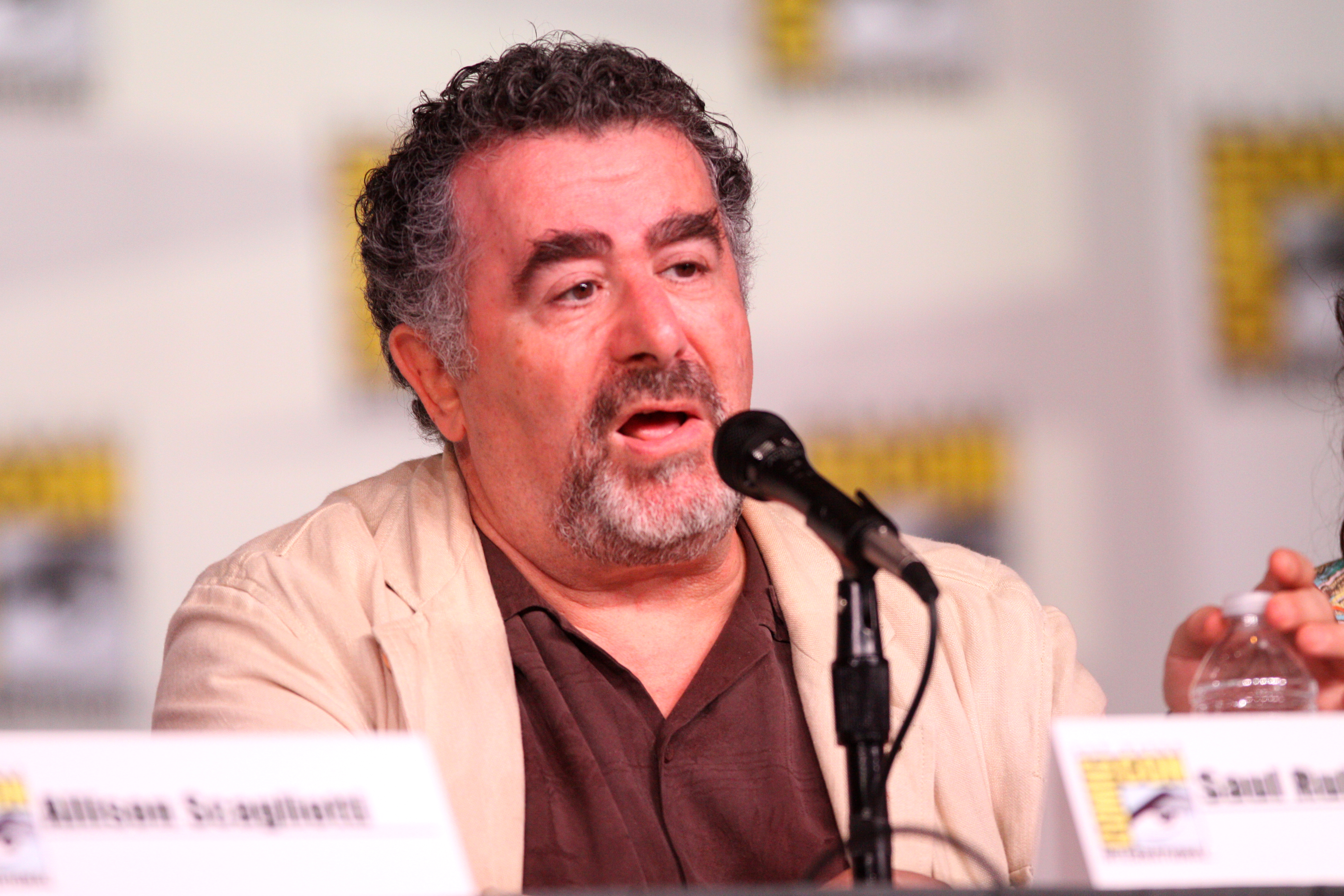
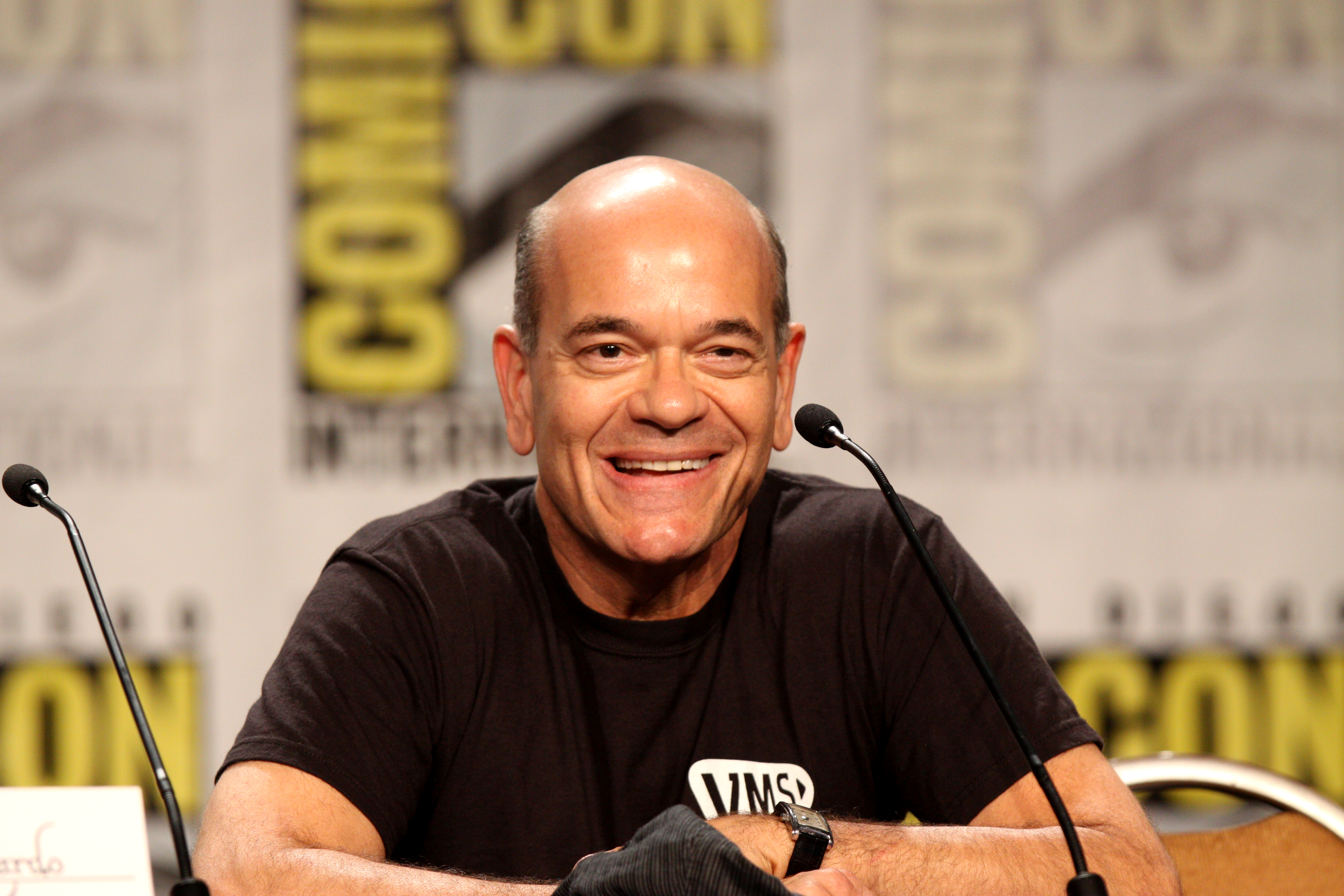
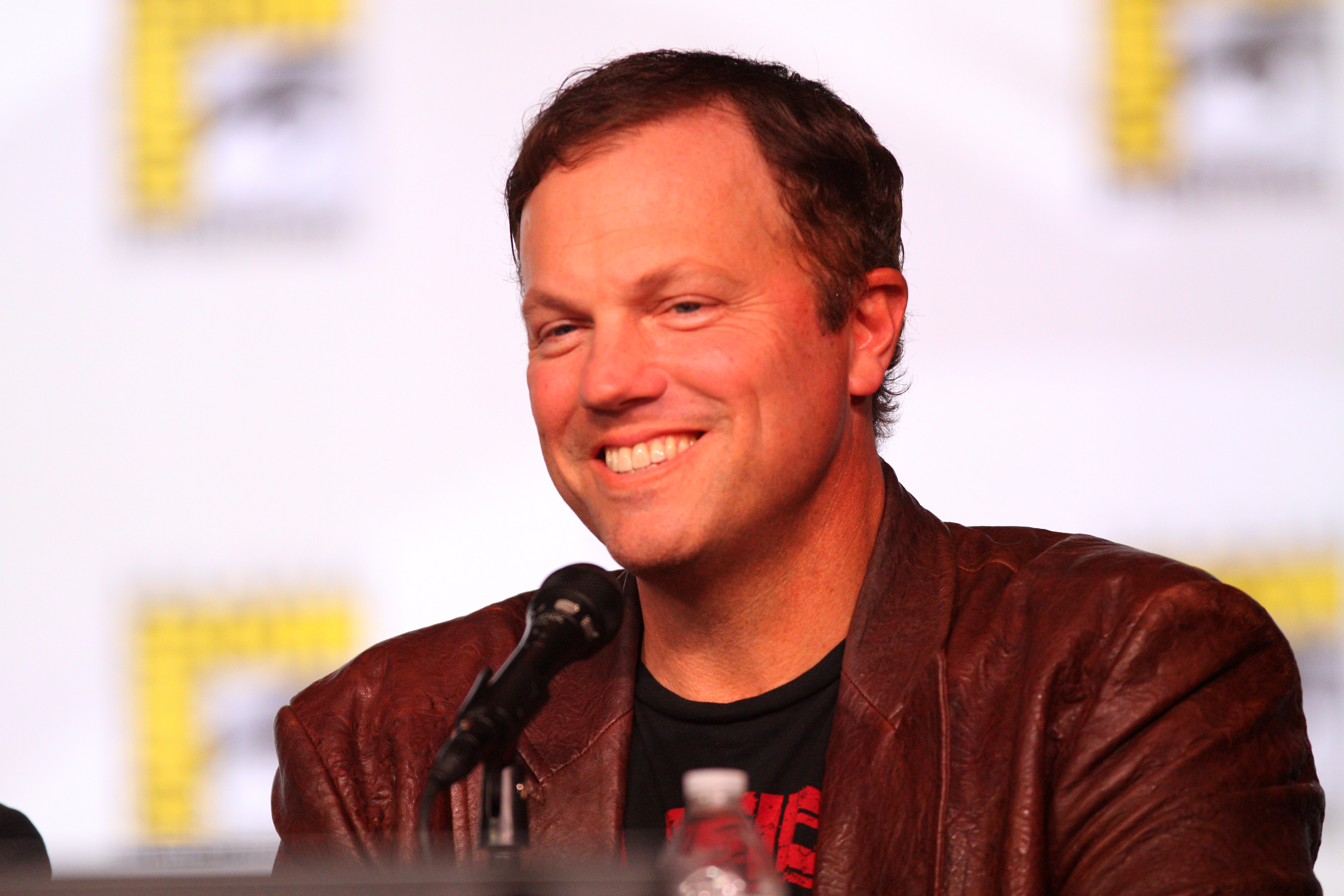
"Heroes" guests stars include Saul Rubinek, Robert Picardo and Adam Baldwin

The show's producers approached Saul Rubinek for the part of journalist and video documentarian, Emmett Bregman, who is tasked with creating a time capsule film showing what goes on in Stargate Command. Cooper described Bregman as being "caught in a situation where he feels responsible to tell the truth about the SGC, yet he's fighting the military agenda to keep it all secret", feeling he is not able to tell the full story. Rubinek was keen to make sure that he was right for the role and that the dialog would fit him, later recalling that he was pleased that the producers were open to his ideas and that the show allowed for improvisations. Developing Bregman, Rubinek wanted to portray him as unapologetic and unsympathetic throughout, with the final reveal being that his documentary does portray them as heroes, whilst Cooper tried to make sure Rubinek did not come across overly villainous. Rubinek became particularly invested in the story, later recalling that Cooper seemed open to his suggestions, with the pair working together to adjust Bregman's dialog to better suit Rubinek.

Tobias Slezak was cast as Tech Sergeant Dale James and Christopher Redman cast as Airman Shep Wickenhouse, who would make up Bregman's documentary crew. Slezak and Redman spent time with members of the show's sound, camera and editing departments in order to learn the crafts they would be portraying. As the documentary's camera operator, actual footage shot by Slezak was used in the finished cut, with the show's camera operators re-filming certain parts. Mitchell Kosterman portrays Colonel Tom Rundell, an Air Force liaison working with Bregman's documentary crew. Kosterman previously appeared in the episode "Seth" playing a different character. Kosterman described modelling his character's attitude on that of director Andy Mikita, wanting Rundell to come across as "calm, capable and likeable". It was later noted by the Air Force that their personnel are not allowed mustaches such as the one sported by Kosterman's character. The two members of SG-13, Senior Airman Simon Wells and Senior Airman Jake Bosworth, that Dr. Fraiser and SG-1 travel off-world to assist, were played by Julius Chapple and Christopher Pearce.

Upon developing "Heroes" into a two-part episode, the part of Agent Richard Woolsey was conceived by Cooper to fill the episode out. The producers were made aware that Robert Picardo was already in Vancouver working on an episode of The Dead Zone and he was offered the role. As Picardo was scheduled to fly to UK, all of his work was condensed into a single day of filming at The Bridge Studios. Picardo described that character's role as being sent to "investigate whether or not heads should roll", determining whether or not there was a lapse in judgement and whether anyone was to blame following a tragic event. Another character who was added after the episode was expanded was Colonel Dave Dixon of SG-13, who was portrayed by Adam Baldwin. Baldwin filmed his parts in late May 2003. Baldwin's performance impressed the producers so much that he was considered for a supporting role in spin-off Stargate Atlantis. David Lewis portrays Cameron Balinsky, another member of SG-13. Recurring actors include Ronny Cox, Bill Dow, Dan Shea and Gary Jones as Senator Kinsey, Dr. Lee, Sgt. Siler and Walter respectively.

=== Filming ===
The original script for "Heroes" was somewhat conceived as a way for production to make a single, inexpensive episode, which would take place almost entirely on the standing Stargate Command sets at The Bridge Studios. Frequent director of the series, Andy Mikita oversaw shooting, which was handled entirely by the show's smaller second unit of photography, filming over a far longer period than the usual seven days that was typically allocated to a single episode, again to keep costs low. Filming initially took place from late March until May; after it was decided that the episode would be expanded into two parts, the additional scenes were shot from May through August 2003. Mikita would later joke that "Heroes" was the episode where production just "wouldn't end" as it spanned such a long period.

A key consideration for director Andy Mikita and director of photography Andrew Wilson was the documentary that the show was centered around. Mikita wanted the documentary footage to hold up when presented alongside the show's regular 35 mm film, whilst having a clear disparity between the two. The show's producers liaised with Sony, who provided MPEG IMX video cameras, as well as a technician for free. Mikita decided to shoot as much documentary footage as he could, expanding upon his brief which had only called for certain parts and scenes to be covered. Careful consideration was taken by Mikita and Wilson to film and present the documentary footage in a way that was accurate of documentary filmmaking, using more obvious and imperfect camera focus pulls and reframing during scenes. Lighting the documentary interview scenes in an authentic way was also given particular care, using the sort of lighting arrangements typically found in documentary interviews, with the shots lit far more brightly than the often dark, high contrast cinematography the show usually relied upon. As both a further documentary filmmaking device and a running gag, when not being filmed by his documentary crew, Saul Rubinek's character of Emmett Bregman would often be scruffily presented, with Mikita trying to surround him in clutter in the corner of a room when conducting his interviews. In the finished edit of the documentary scenes, Bregman would then be smartly presented in a suit and tie, having obviously filmed his parts separate from the "real" interview.

Originally, all bar a single scene were dialog-heavy pieces taking place on the Stargate Command set. Mikita sought to keep the energy high and build drama by encouraging actors to talk over the top of each other where appropriate – something production would typically try to avoid for continuity editing. During filming the actors were given room to improvise lines, as was typical of the show. This included a scene between in the cafeteria where Teryl Rothery noticed Saul Rubinek had accidentally left his real wedding ring on leading her, as Fraiser, to ask about Bregman's marriage. In a scene in the infirmary, Mikita prompted Christopher Redman to "accidentally" knock Rubinek's character with the boom mic, which elicited a response from him. This continued into the subsequent scene, where Tobias Slezak's character then begins filming Bregman's attempts at flirting with Fraiser. Don S. Davis, who was vocal about how extraordinary he believed the script to be and found his scenes particularly difficult, became emotional during filming. Director Andy Mikita later commented that he believed that Davis's time serving in the United States Army had given him a far deeper, first-hand connection to the subjects being tackled in the show.

Prior to filming Bregman's passionate tirade against the Stargate Command personnel, a scene which would go on to be regarded by fans and the show's cast and crew as one of the episode's best moments, Saul Rubinek and Robert C. Cooper had a "heated" discussion in Rubinek's trailer. After keeping the crew waiting for some time, the two returned to set and Rubinek shot the scene, with Cooper later commenting that he felt like the rant was somewhat directed towards him.

Before being expanded, the episode's one scene filmed on location was in Broadview Park, Burnaby, involving Daniel and Fraiser aiding the injured member of SG-13. When the episode was expanded, the crew returned to this location for additional filming. Originally due to the time of year, the location was deciduous with leaves on the ground and bare trees, however due to the time that had passed, the location was now far more evergreen. As a result, the crew had to spend some time scorching the location, bringing in their own leaves to cover the ground to maintain continuity. During Dr. Fraiser's final moments, Michael Shanks as Daniel Jackson held onto Teryl Rothery's hand, although it could not be seen on screen. Rothery later commented that the fact they were filming out of sequence meant she was back on the Stargate set the following day after filming her death, which she felt made the experience of leaving the show somewhat easier.

After being developed into a two episode arc and requiring additional material, a number of new scenes were required. In order to accommodate the schedules of both the cast and production crew, as well as minimizing costs, a rural location outside Langley, British Columbia along the Canada–United States border was selected that could be used for both "Heroes" and another episode, "Birthright". The location was big enough that production could split into two crews operating simultaneously. The Stargate was erected on location, with Mikita shooting it from one angle and "Birthright" director Peter Woeste shooting the exact same gate, but from a different angle to give the impression that they were different worlds. The new scenes included SG-13, consisting of Simon Wells (Julius Chapple), Jake Bosworth (Christopher Pearce), Dave Dixon (Adam Baldwin) and Cameron Balinsky (David Lewis) coming through the Stargate and discovering the Ancient ruins, destroying a Goa'uld probe as well as Simon Wells being shot in the back. The most significant addition was the battle sequence involving SG-1 and other SG teams against the Goa'uld ground and spacecraft. The battle sequence included heavy use of gasoline mortar explosions to simulate attacking ships, so local residents were advised, as were US Customs, given the site's close proximity to the United States border. The main battle sequence was mostly shot in one large tracking shot, with four cameras rolling simultaneously.

Upon being added to the show, Robert Picardo had prior commitments coming up, meaning he would have to film all of his scenes as Richard Woolsey in a single day. The dialog heavy scenes were complicated by the fact that Cooper and Mikita wanted Woolsey to separately interrogate Samantha Carter, Daniel Jackson and Teal'c, but present it as one long take that would switch between the interrogatees as the camera panned round the room. To achieve the shot, Tapping, Shanks and Judge would position themselves out of shot and switch with each other as the camera moved around the room.

=== Post-production ===
Editor Eric Hill, along with Andy Mikita and Robert C. Cooper, produced their first cut of the episode which ran for 64 minutes, which was then edited down slightly to around 60 minutes. Cooper then decided that he did not want to cut additional material, commenting "we fell in love with so many scenes and we couldn't bear to cut them". The producers of the show and The Sci-fi Channel discussed presenting the episode as a special-length show, however Cooper was aware that if they did that, they would still need to make a 44-minute version for syndication. Cooper instead got approval to turn "Heroes" into a two-part episode, on the premise that they would write and film new material to reach the 88 minute requirement. As work was wrapping on the first ten episodes, with production set to take its mid-season break, the production team set about reorganizing the remainder of the season.

To further distinguish between the documentary and regular film footage, Hill and Mikita experimented with adding overlay graphics to the documentary shots, such as a recording symbol and grid lines, although ultimately decided that it was not necessary. When using documentary footage in a scene, care was taken to try to then cut back to a regular film shot showing the documentary crew to further emphasize the documentary premise of the show. The post-production team at Rainmaker Digital Effects spent additional time colour correcting all of the day two footage shot on the Sony MPEG IMX cameras, after all of the footage came out very blue due to the camera being incorrectly setup.

A number of scenes were significantly trimmed in length during editing, including the first meeting between General George Hammond and Emmett Bregman and a later scene where Bregman lobbies the United States President for release of the video footage shot off-world by Daniel Jackson. The latter was cut by Cooper, who felt it was too comedic and did not want to break the tension given the upcoming reveal that Janet Fraiser had died. The final scene shot for the episode, where SG-13's Colonel Dave Dixon communicates with Hammond, O'Neill and Carter back at the SGC was also shortened, partly due to Richard Dean Anderson (O'Neill) having significantly shorter hair than he did in his previous scene due to the time between shooting.

== Release and reception ==
=== Plot leak ===
An earlier draft of the plot was leaked online in February 2003, before filming had even begun. Whilst Bregman was instead named "Parker", most of the details were as they appear in the final episode, including the key spoilers that O'Neill would be shot and that Janet would die whilst saving Wells on an off-world mission. Prior to airing, a "Save Janet Fraiser" fan campaign was set up encouraging fans to voice their desire to save Fraiser by writing to producer Robert Cooper, Sky Television, The Sci-fi Channel and MGM.

=== Broadcast and ratings ===
"Heroes" continued the seventh season's trend of airing first on Sky One in the United Kingdom, with part 1 being shown on February 3, 2004, attracting 730,000 viewers and part 2, which was shown on February 10, 2004, attracting 780,000 viewers. In the United States, part 1 aired February 13 on Sci-fi Channel and earned a 1.8 household rating and a 1.9 rating for Part 2 on February 20, equating to approximately 2.3 million viewers. Part 1 was the milestone 150th episode of the series. In Canada, part 1 of "Heroes" was first shown on December 30, 2004, on SPACE.

=== Reception ===
IGN commented that "Where "Heroes, Part One" eased the viewer into the usual comfort zone for the series, "Heroes, Part Two" kicks you right out of that zone with a boot to the solar plexus", noting that it would be an episode which audiences did not soon forget. Writing for Tor.com, Keith R.A. DeCandido declared the episode the best of season 7. DeCandido observed that whilst the episode would be remembered as the end of Janet Fraiser, it also had "spectacular guest turns" by Robert Picardo and Saul Rubinek. Den of Geek praised the episodes subversion of audience expectations, highlighting the performance of guest star Saul Rubinek, with Chris Allcock writing "from the handheld cameras to the talking heads to the non-linear narrative and the tragedy it hides, Heroes delivers everything besides the audience's expectations, and is supremely powerful as a result". The episode was placed 3rd in their "25 Best Episodes of Stargate SG-1 list". Julia Houston for About.com summed up the two-parter, writing "you'll find the first hour a little slow, but worth it for the payoff in part two", praising guest performances from Rubinek and Adam Baldwin. Houston went on to write "The task of preserving the truth about our heroes here is an effective tribute not to the characters of the show, but to American soldiers in Iraq", drawing parallels to the media coverage of the Iraq War.

Screen Rant described the episode as "one of the best, if not the best, written and performed episode in the entire show", including it amongst their "The 5 Best Episodes Of Stargate SG-1 (& 5 Worst)". Comet writer Kieran Dickson placed the episode 4th on his list of the "10 Best Episodes of Stargate SG-1", commenting that it was "the only episode of a TV show to turn me into a weeping mess". Eamonn McCusker of The Digital Fix wrote that the episode was amongst the best of SG-1's run until that point, calling the second part "excellent and genuinely affecting" applauding the decision to portray a major character death in the faces of guest actors. DVD Talk also hailed the "compelling drama" as being amongst the best of SG-1's run-to-date. Amy Walker of Set the Tape wrote that the episode "comes out of nowhere to shock the audience and forever change the series", commending the episodes representation of those in the military and placing it second in what she believed to be the shows greatest episodes. WhatCulture placed Saul Rubinek as the best guest appearance of Stargate SG-1's entire 10-year run, calling it one of Rubinek's "finest performances of his entire career".

Of the featured reviews written by contributors on the Stargate fansite Gateworld.net, one by Lex was critical of what they called a "poor attempt at misdirection" by revealing that Janet Fraiser had died and not Jack O'Neill. The writer also commented that they couldn't understand the point of why Janet had been killed off, pondering if they were supposed to be relieved that it was Fraiser and not O'Neill. Whilst highlighting the great performances from the cast, they were further critical of the lack of scenes involving Teal'c or Jack O'Neill and questioned the absence of Janet's adopted daughter, Cassandra. In a separate review published by Gateworld.net, Alli Snow was far more positive about the "terrific", "timely and moving" episode, praising the way in which the departure of Fraiser was handled, which they believed to be a fitting tribute to both the character and those in the military whom the character represents. Many fans were critical of the fact that Cassandra Fraiser, portrayed by Colleen Rennison, wasn't featured in the episode. It was originally claimed by the producers in The Illustrated Companion that Rennison was unavailable, Rennison later commented that she was never approached to appear in "Heroes" and had been unaware that Fraiser had died.

=== Awards and nominations ===
"Heroes" was nominated for four Leo Awards. Director Andy Mikita was nominated for "Dramatic Series: Best Direction", with Michael Robison ultimately winning for his direction on The Collector episode, "The Roboticist". Writer Robert C. Cooper was nominated for "Dramatic Series: Best Screenwriting", with Brian McKeown, Linda Svendsen taking the award home for their work on Human Cargo, whilst Eric Hill's editing was nominated for "Best Picture Editing", but also lost out to part 5 of Human Cargo. Don S. Davis (General George Hammond) performance in the episode was nominated the category "Dramatic Series: Best Supporting Performance - Male", with Zak Santiago Alam taking the award for Human Cargo. Both parts of the episode were nominated for the "Best Dramatic Presentation, Short Form" category of the Hugo Awards, with the episode "33" of Battlestar Galactica taking the award home.

== Home media ==
"Heroes", still split into two parts as they were broadcast, along with subsequent episodes "Resurrection" and "Inauguration" were first released on Region 2 DVD on May 31, 2004, as part of the "Volume 36" standalone disc, before being released as part of the Season 7 boxset on October 19, 2004. A behind the scenes featurette of the episode "SG-1 Directors Series - Heroes", as well as commentary by director Andy Mikita, Andrew Wilson and Robert C. Cooper were included in the DVD releases.

Three deleted scenes were made available on the Sci-Fi Channel's website after the episode aired. These include a scene in which Bregman debates with Col. Rundell over his access to restricted parts of Stargate Command, another where a frustrated Bregman tries to call the president and finally a scene which would have appeared at the end of the episode, where Bregman's finished film is delivered to Jack O'Neill's house. Two of these were later added to SCI FI Pulse for a limited time, but have since remained otherwise unavailable and unreleased.

The episodes along with the rest of season 7 were first made available digitally in January 2008 through iTunes and Amazon Unbox. The episode, along with every other episode of the series, were made available to stream for the first time through Netflix in the USA on August 15, 2010.
