= Fullscreen (aspect ratio) =

Aspect ratio of 4:3

The aspect ratio of 4:3

Fullscreen (or full screen) refers to the 4:3 (1.33:1) aspect ratio of early standard television screens and computer monitors. Widescreen ratios started to become more popular in the late 2000s and early 2010s.

Film originally created in the 4:3 aspect ratio does not need to be altered for full-screen release. In contrast, other aspect ratios can be converted to full screen using techniques such as pan and scan, open matte or reframing. In pan and scan, the 4:3 image is extracted from within the original frame by cropping the sides of the film. In open matte, the 4:3 image is extracted from parts of the original negative which were shot but not intended to be used for the theatrical release. In reframing, elements within the image are repositioned. Reframing is used for entirely CG movies, where the elements can be easily moved.

== History ==
A full-screen television mounted in a dentist office

Full-screen aspect ratios in standard television have been in use since the invention of moving picture cameras. Early computer monitors employed the same aspect ratio. The aspect ratio 4:3 was used for 35 mm films in the silent era. It is also very close to the 1.375:1 Academy ratio, defined by the Academy of Motion Picture Arts and Sciences as a standard after the advent of optical sound-on-film. By having TV match this aspect ratio, movies originally photographed on 35 mm film could be satisfactorily viewed on TV in the early days of television (i.e. the 1940s and the 1950s). When cinema attendance dropped, Hollywood created widescreen aspect ratios (such as 1.85:1) in order to differentiate the film industry from TV. However, at the turn of the 21st century, broadcasters worldwide began phasing out the 4:3 standard entirely and manufacturers started to favor the 16:9 aspect ratio for modern high-definition television sets, broadcast cameras and computer monitors.

== List of video resolutions ==
Standard	Resolution	Pixels (Mpx)
VGA	640×480	0.3072 Mpx
PAL (4:3)	768×576	0.442368 Mpx
SVGA	800×600	0.48 Mpx
1000-Width (4:3) / Early XGA	1000×750	0.75 Mpx
XGA	1024×768	0.786432 Mpx
XGA+	1152×864	0.995328 Mpx
SXGA-	1280×960	1.2288 Mpx
SXGA+	1400×1050	1.47 Mpx
HDV 1080i	1440×1080	1.5552 Mpx
QPAL	1536×1152	1.769472 Mpx
UXGA	1600×1200	1.92 Mpx
Fullscreen 2K	1920×1440	2.7648 Mpx
2000-Width (4:3) / Early QXGA	2000×1500	3 Mpx
QXGA	2048×1536	3.145728 Mpx
QSXGA-	2560×1920	4.9152 Mpx
QSXGA+	2800×2100	5.88 Mpx
QUXGA	3200×2400	7.68 Mpx
