= Reframing =

Reframing may refer to:

- Cognitive reframing
- Reframing (filmmaking)
- Making a picture frame again

== See also ==
- Frame (disambiguation)
