= Resurrection (Stargate SG-1) =

- Stargate SG-1 episode
- Episode no.: Season 7 Episode 19
- Directed by: Amanda Tapping
- Written by: Michael Shanks
- Cinematography by: Jim Menard
- Editing by: Brad Rines
- Production code: P259
- Original air date: February 17, 2004
- Running time: 44 minutes

Guest appearances
- Kristen Dalton as Anna; Brad Greenquist as Keffler; Peter Flemming as Malcolm Barrett; Bill Dow as Dr. Lee

Episode chronology
← Previous "Heroes"	Next → "Inauguration"
- Stargate SG-1 (season 7)

"Resurrection" is the 19th episode from the seventh season of military science fiction adventure television show Stargate SG-1 and is the 151st overall. It was first broadcast on February 17, 2004, on Sky One in the United Kingdom. The episode was written by Michael Shanks and was directed by Amanda Tapping.

In the episode, Major Samantha Carter (Amanda Tapping), Dr. Daniel Jackson (Michael Shanks) and Teal'c (Christopher Judge) of SG-1 are sent to investigate a massacre at a rogue NID facility. They meet with Malcolm Barrett (Peter Flemming) who tells them that one woman, Anna (Kristen Dalton) was responsible for the slaughter of 32 people.

"Resurrection" is the only episode of Stargate SG-1 to be both written and directed by members of the main cast, with Michael Shanks who portrays Dr. Daniel Jackson writing and Amanda Tapping, who portrays Major Samantha Carter directing. It is also the first and only episode of the show to be directed by a woman.

== Plot ==
Major Samantha Carter (Amanda Tapping), Dr. Daniel Jackson (Michael Shanks) and Teal'c (Christopher Judge) of SG-1 have been summoned to a Los Angeles warehouse to meet with agent Agent Barrett (Peter Flemming) of the NID. Barrett tells the team that the facility was being used by a rogue element of his organisation, who were all massacred by one woman who is being detained. The team locate a room full of artifacts which Teal'c believes belonged to the Goa'uld Sekhmet. Barrett believes they were originally recovered by the Germans, and tells SG-1 they are holding another survivor, Dr. Keffler who is the son of a Nazi War Criminal. Carter and Barrett begin their interrogation of Dr. Keffler (Brad Greenquist), who is reluctant to tell them who Anna is or what the facility was being used for. Unsuccessful, they head back to Daniel and Teal'c who have been studying the artifacts, one of which is a locked Goa'uld ark, that they are unable to open.

Daniel visits Anna (Kristen Dalton) who is being held in a glass and steel cell which covered in strange and disturbing charcoal drawings. He questions her to try and determine why the rogue NID wanted her. Anna insists that she didn't kill anyone, even after Daniel show's her security camera footage of her killing people. She does however reveal that Dr. Keffler made her. SG-1 and agent Barrett try to understand how Keffler could have created Anna as her age and that of the operation fail to align. Daniel visits Anna again who tells him that the inspiration for her drawings come from flashes that she sees. She tells Daniel that although the drawings scare her, Keffler hurts her if she takes them down from the walls of her cell. Carter discovers that amongst the artifacts originally recovered was a canopic jar containing a Goa'uld symbiote. According to the research logs at the facility, Keffler created Anna by combining Goa'uld and human DNA to create a hybrid.

Through analysing Anna's drawings, Daniel discovers how to open the Goa'uld ark. However, on opening it, they discover it is a naqahdah bomb. Keffler tells Barrett and Carter that he created Anna as a conduit to access the genetic memories of the Goa'uld and that she has two personalities, Anna and the Goa'uld Sekhmet. Teal'c and Dr. Lee (Bill Dow) set about trying to defuse the bomb, whilst Daniel tries to get Anna to remember how to defuse it through meditation. This leads to Sekhmet emerging, who then sets fire to all the drawings in the cell. Anna manages to escape her cell, as does Keffler when he hears about her escape. They encounter each other in a corridor, and gunshots are heard, after which Daniel discovers them both lying dead.

== Production ==
=== Development and writing ===
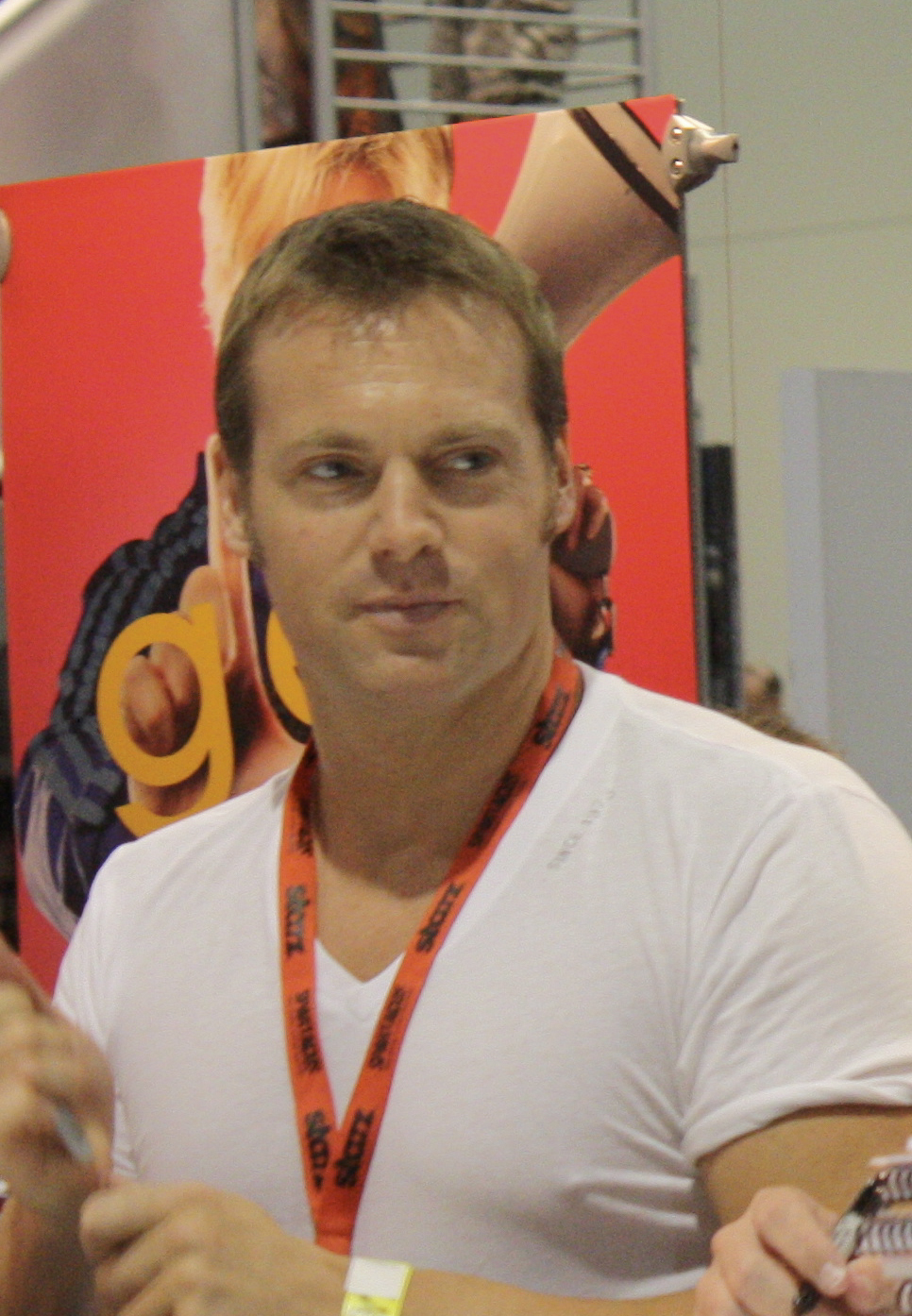
Michael Shanks who portrays Dr. Daniel Jackson wrote the episode.

The episode was written by Michael Shanks who portrays Dr. Daniel Jackson in Stargate SG-1. Writing an episode of SG-1 was negotiated as part of his contract for the show's seventh season. Shanks pitched the writers a number of different stories, one being a sequel to the season three episode "Crystal Skull", with elements of the pitch informing the episode "Evolution". Additionally, Shanks also considered writing a story that would have explored Daniel's time as an ascended being. According to Shanks his pitch for what became "Resurrection" "started as a vampire story" and became "a conspiracy story".

In trying to find a place to start writing, Shanks looked to what he considered the "original concept" of Stargate, which was tying real world mythologies and mysteries into an SG-1 story. He imagined that during Napoleon's visit to the Great Sphinx of Giza during the French campaign in Egypt and Syria, Napoleon had discovered a canopic jar containing the remains of a dead Goa'uld inside. The jar and the remains within it were then passed along to a museum, before being captured by the Nazis who conducted experiments on the Goa'uld remains. These experiments were later continued by the NID, a rogue government organisation from the Stargate universe.

Prior to meeting with the Stargate SG-1 writers, Shanks was asked to get as much of his story "on the page" as possible. Upon meeting with the writers and show-runner Robert C. Cooper in early June 2003, Shanks described his idea "ended up getting bandied around the room", and the "details had to be rehashed, redone or fussed with a little bit and adjusted", with certain elements being cut and new ones added. According to Shanks, after breaking the story the NID had become a much larger part of the episode.

After completing his script, Shanks believed the "heart of the story was still there" but felt as though he had not been "quite able to fully realize" the relationship between his character, Daniel Jackson, and Anna. Shanks felt that this meant there was not "enough of an emotional connection" made to the character of Anna and therefore felt the ending was not as "poignant as it could have been". Shanks described his finished story as "an Earth-based story" in which the NID "attempts to create a hybrid Goa'uld-human".

=== Cast, characters and design ===
Due to it being the final episode filmed of season seven, Richard Dean Anderson had already wrapped for the year, therefore his character Jack O'Neill was not included in the episode. Don S. Davis character George Hammond was also absent.

Kristen Dalton portrays the character of Anna. Shanks described the part as a "strong female lead". Brad Greenquist portrays Keffler. Shanks had nobody in particular when writing the character, describing the part as an "older German scientist". Director Amanda Tapping selected Greenquist, who was living and working in Los Angeles, after watching his audition tape. Greenquist saw Keffler as "very practical and logical", describing him as "trying to save millions or billions of people by doing this experiment". Peter Flemming reprises the role of NID Agent Malcolm Barrett. Stunt co-ordinator Dan Shea stood in for Flemming when Anna attacks Barrett. Bill Dow reprises the character Dr. Lee. As with previous episodes, Tapping as director would keep the camera rolling after the end of a scene in case Dow had any ad-libs. Andrew Wilson, the show's second unit director of photography and Bruce Woloshyn, the show's visual effects supervisor both cameo as dead scientists.

Art director James Robbins produced all of Anna's charcoal drawings. Tapping asked that he "go really over-the-top scary" with his illustrations which would line her prison cell walls. The script described the pictures as "alien drawings" that could be "anything from memories to nasty images". To tie the imagery into the story Art department assistant Teresa Uy researched materials relating to Sekhmet, which Robbins then referred to for many of his drawings, whilst he also produced illustrations of aliens, ships, the Stargate and "strange lands". Robbins ultimately produced around 75 pictures for the episode in three days. Robbins also designed the Naquadah ark, which turns out to be a bomb. The prop had a number of mechanical and electrical functions, including a countdown timer. During filming, production had some difficulty getting the countdown timer to operate at the desired speed. A glass cage that would imprison Anna was also designed and constructed for the episode. When first conceived, it was assumed that the cage would be built out of plexiglass, which was cheaper, lighter and created less reflections when filming compared to glass, however due to a scene involving a fire, a steel and glass version had to be created.

=== Filming ===
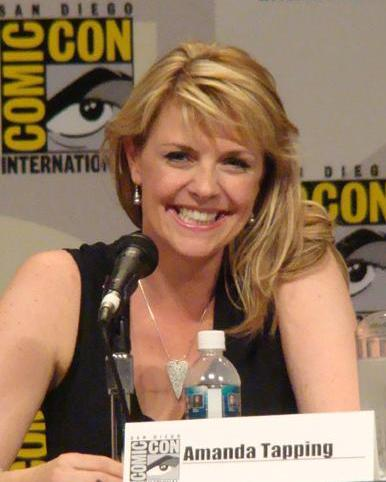
Amanda Tapping who portrays Major Samantha Carter made her directorial debut with the episode. Tapping was the first woman to direct an episode of Stargate SG-1.

The episode was directed by Amanda Tapping, who portrays Samantha Carter. The episode would be Tapping's television directorial debut, having only previously directed theatre. Tapping was the first woman to direct an episode of Stargate SG-1 and became the second member of the show's main cast to direct the show, with Michael Shanks having directed during the show's fourth season. Tapping had first asked to direct during the shows third season. According to Tapping, "Resurrection" had been expected to enter production earlier in the season, however Shank's script had not been completed, which coupled with Anna-Louise Plowman's availability for "Chimera" meant the episode "got pushed back and pushed back until it was the very last episode that we shot" of season seven.

As preparation for directing, Tapping shadowed Stargate SG-1 colleague Martin Wood directing the series Jeremiah. Additionally, Tapping spent her time between her scenes observing directors Peter DeLuise & Andy Mikita, as well as talking to the show's camera department. For prepping to shoot her episode Tapping was given 3 days, some of which was during the filming of "Lost City". Tapping worked with art director James Robbins to produce storyboards for select scenes and then put together a comprehensive shot list.

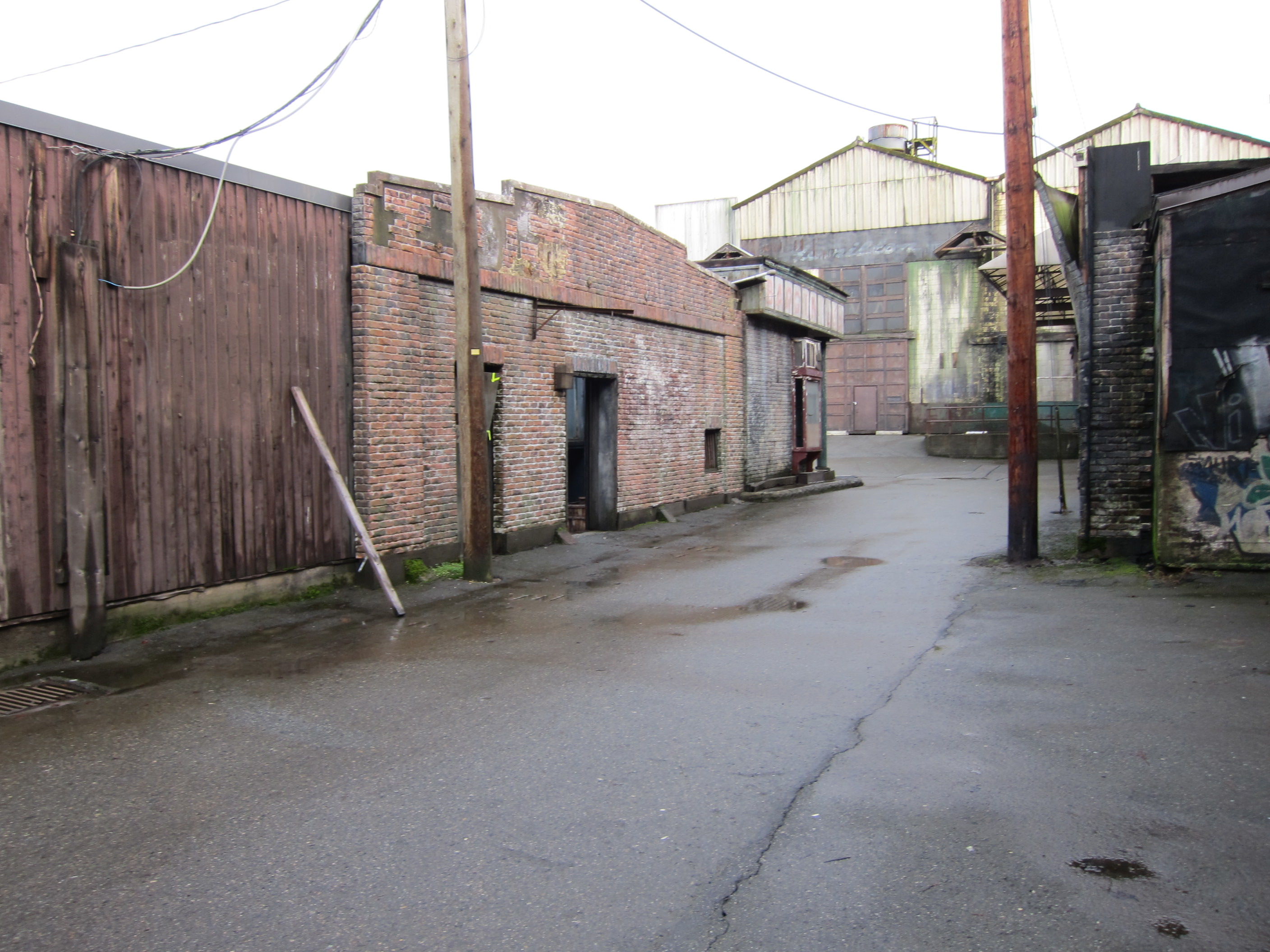
The episode was filmed entirely on location at Terminal City Iron Works in Vancouver, which stood in for Los Angeles.

Filming commenced on August 28, 2003, which was incidentally Tapping's birthday. The episode was shot entirely on location at Terminal City Iron Works in Vancouver, Canada. Production utilized both the exterior and interior of the complex, building a laboratory, artefact room and a large glass cage in the centre of a large warehouse.

Due to the volume of dialog in the episode, Tapping "felt the show needed movement because there was just so much happening, and so much talky-talky". In order to achieve this, Tapping heavily relied upon steadicam and crane shots. The director also wanted a lot of "texture" in her shots, and to give a "creepy" nature to them. Along with employing a lot of movement in her shots, Tapping was keen to use a lot of long takes, often without cutting away for additional camera coverage. This was used by Tapping as both a stylistic choice and in order to save time. Due to being the last episode of the season to be filmed, there would be no additional time after principal photography wrapped for the show's second unit to get any additional material. Tapping was therefore in regular contact with the episodes editor, Brad Rines, who began editing the episode whilst filming was underway allowing them to capture any additional, inserts or coverage that Rines felt was missing.

Tapping had hoped to direct again, however ultimately was not given the opportunity on SG-1 or either of the spin-off series. Ultimately "Resurrection" remained the only episode of Stargate SG-1 to be directed by a woman. In 2021 SG-1, Stargate Atlantis and Stargate Universe co-creator Brad Wright revealed that should a fourth spin-off go-ahead, Tapping would be asked to direct.

== Release ==
=== Broadcast and ratings ===
"Resurrection" was first broadcast on February 17, 2004, on Sky One in the United Kingdom and was the second most watched program on the channel that week, with approximately 773,000 viewers. The episode was first shown in the United States on February 27, 2004, on Sci Fi, earning a 1.7 household rating. This was down 0.2 from the previous week's episode "Heroes" part 2, though Stargate SG-1 remained the most watched program on Sci Fi. In Canada the episode was first shown on January 13, 2005, on SPACE. The episode was first syndicated in the United States in the last week of April 2005, earning a household rating of 1.6.

=== Reception ===
A promotional photograph of Amanda Tapping as Samantha Carter kissing Michael Shanks as Daniel Jackson taken during filming the episode was released to the press and online prior to the episode airing, leading to a lot of fan speculation about the context of the kiss. The kiss was not part of the final scene or episode leading to some confusion amongst fans.

Reaction to the episode was mixed. Jan Vincent-Rudzki of TV Zone wrote "Although there's nothing exactly wrong with it, there's nothing notable either", giving the episode 6 out of 10. He went on to describe the dialog surrounding the threat as "all a bit too glib to give much sense of danger" and believed that Anna did "little that gains our sympathy" and described Keffler as a "villain with no redeeming features". Jayne Dearsley for SFX felt that despite a strong start, the "talking nature of the script" dragged things down but did however pick back up at the end of the episode, awarding it 3 out of 5. Dearsley believed the story was a prime example of the show's "charm" and ability to build upon past stories and in order to make "them much more meaningful". She did however criticise Keffler, calling him "so over-the-top" and also felt that Anna being "fully-grown, functional, attractive" was "a little too much to swallow". Paul Spragg of Starburst called "Resurrection" "a very simple story very ponderously told", awarding it 2 out of 5. Spragg noted Tapping's directorial debut and felt that she hadn't been given "anything especially interesting to shoot, stuck as she is with a glass box and a few corridors" calling it a "workmanlike effort with few technical flourishes". Spragg believed it was "painfully obvious" that Sekhmet was controlling Anna, but did enjoy Brad Greenquist's performance as Keffler, favourably comparing him to Cigarette Smoking Man from The X-Files.

Reviewers were particularly critical of the what was shown onscreen verses the offscreen. Dearsley commented that the episode "starts off promisingly, throwing the audience right into the action in the aftermath of the massacre" before becoming "a little monotonous", whilst Vincent-Rudzki felt that the episodes back story was more "interesting than what we actually get", which Spragg also echoed, asserting that "everything interesting happens before the audience arrives". Of the reviews featured on fansite Gateworld, contributor Lex called the writing "an interesting change in pace from the majority of the season", feeling that there was more dialog than usual and praising the "weaving of previous plotlines into the story". Lex was however critical of using a bomb to create tension describing it as "something we've surely seen dozens of times before". Keith R.A. DeCandido for Tor.com included the episode as a runner-up for what he believed to be the best episode of season seven praising it for tying "into the show’s mythos very nicely" and calling it "a rare Earth-based episode that feels significant rather than budget-saving filler".

=== Home media ===
"Resurrection" along with the episodes "Heroes" and "Inauguration" were first released on Region 2 DVD on May 31, 2004, as part of the "Volume 36" standalone disc, before being released as part of the Season 7 boxset on October 19, 2004. A behind the scenes featurette of the episode "SG-1 Directors Series - Resurrection", as well as commentary by director Amanda Tapping and camera operator Will Warring were included in the DVD releases. "Grace" along with the rest of season 7 was first made available digitally in January 2008 through iTunes and Amazon Unbox. The episode, along with every other episode of the series, were made available to stream for the first time through Netflix in the USA on August 15, 2010. The episode, along with the rest of the series has been upscaled for releases on various streaming platforms and the 2020 Blu-ray release.
