= Bill Dow =

Canadian actor and director

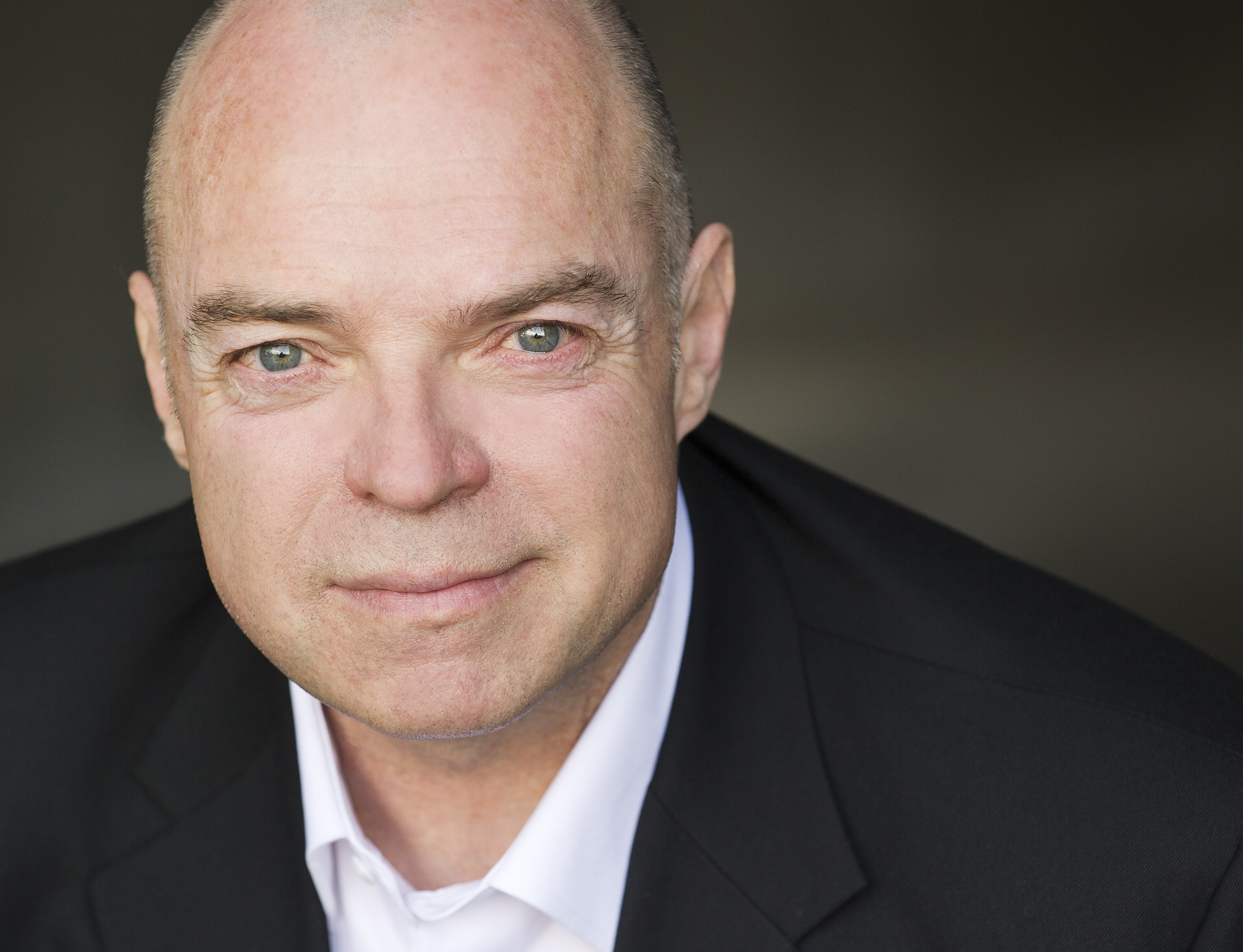
Dow in 2012

Bill Dow is an actor, director and writer in theatre, film, and television. He is best known for playing Bill Lee in the Stargate franchise.

== Career ==
He also had a recurring roles as Russ Hathaway in the Canadian drama series Da Vinci's Inquest, as Mr. Parkman in Pasadena, Dr. Charles Burks in The X Files, and Dr. Veet in the film, Absolute Zero. Bill Dow has played many other guest star and recurring roles in a variety of television series such as Kyle XY and feature films, and has directed several award-winning theater productions for the Vancouver Playhouse where he was Artistic Associate for many years.

As an actor Dow has performed many lead roles, including a 2004 Jessie Award-winning performance as Martin Dysart in Peter Shaffer's Equus. He served as associate artistic director at the Blyth Festival and the Belfry Theatre, and resident dramaturge at the Banff Playwrights Colony. Bill Dow also played a part in the 2015 Film Autumn Dreams as the driver of Ben.

== Personal life ==
Dow completed his interdisciplinary PhD in Theatre and Classical Mythology at Simon Fraser University in 2013. His studies included an examination of Greek tragedy and the writing of a 'new' tragedy – Cupid's Arrow, that tells the beginnings of the story of Jason and Medea – a prequel to Euripides' Medea. He maintains an active acting and directing career while teaching Theatre and Mythology at Simon Fraser University.

== Filmography ==
=== Film ===
Year	Title	Role	Notes
1988	Betrayed	Man At Gate	
1989	The Fly II	Man	
1993	This Boy's Life	Vice Principal	
1993	Cool Runnings	Registration Official	
1994	Andre	Ellwyn	
1994	Legends Of The Fall	Longley	
1995	Gun For Hire	Ed Quigley	
1996	Big Bully	David's Father	
1997	Mr. Magoo	Museum Curator	
1999	The Arrangement	Father Kirby	
2000	Suspicious River	Mr. Schmidt	
2000	My Five Wives	Sheriff	
2000	Chain Of Fools	Doctor	
2001	See Spot Run	Doctor	
2002	Lone Hero	Dillman	
2003	Moving Malcolm	Justice Of The Peace	
2007	The Power Lunch	The Canadian	Short Film
2008	Mothers&Daughters	Fit Older Man	
2008	Girlfriend Experience	Marcus	
2009	The Zero Sum	Harry	
2009	Replay	Anderchuk	Short Film
2010	The Tortured	Hospital Doctor	
2011	The Big Year	Dr. Paul Elkin	
2012	Humbug	Ernest Opal	Short Film
2015	12 Rounds 3: Lockdown	Keppler	
2017	Fifty Shades Darker	Willis	
2017	The Humanity Bureau	Chief Of Staff	
2018	Fifty Shades Freed	Willis	
2018	Parallel	Reid	
2024	Are We Done Now?	Acting Teacher	

=== Television ===
Year	Title	Role	Notes
1986	Disneyland	NASA Technician	Episode "Hero In The Family"
1986–1987	Danger Bay	Eddie/ Jeff Hewlett	6 Episodes
1987	The New Adventures Of Beans Baxter	Red	Episode "Beans Goes To Camp"
1987–1991	21 Jump Steet	Woody/Mr Drake	2 Episodes
1988–1991	MacGyver	Danko/White Suited Man	2 Episodes
1989	The Lady Forgets	Butler	TV Movie
1991	Deadly Intentions... Again?	Bill Garner	TV Movie
1991	And The Sea Will Tell	Bernie Leonard	TV Movie
1991	Our Shining Moment	Barney	TV Movie
1992	Dead Ahead: The Exxon Valdez Disaster	Larry Shier	TV Movie
1992–1995	The Commish	Art/Dave Welker/Peeper	4 Episodes
1993	Without A Kiss Goodbye	Judge Banner	TV Movie
1993	Highlander	Harry	Episode "Epitaph For Tommy"
1993–2018	The X-Files	Dad/Chuck Burks/Dr. Rick Newton/Pangborn	9 Episodes
1994	Seasons Of The Heart	Neighbor Father	TV Movie
1994	Robin's Hoods	Sian/Sean O'Flynn	3 Episodes
1995	The Omen	Reichman	TV Movie
1995	Strange Luck	Wilbur Mudd	Episode "Last Chance"
1995	The Marshal	Deputy US Marshal Bill	2 Episodes
1996	Two	Hotel Manager	Episode "Black Ops"
1996	Madison	Arthur Hood	Episode "No Sell-Out"
1997	Contagious	Dr. Andauer	TV Movie
1997	NightScream	Will Benson	Tv Movie
1997	Jitters	Lou Eldman	TV Movie
1997	Married To A Stranger	Doctor	TV Movie
1997	Cloned	Alan Prescott	TV Movie
1997	North Of 60	Oliver Swain	Episode "Oil And Water"
1997–1998	Super Dave's All Stars	Baldness Guy	
1997–1998	The Outer Limits	Doc Fink/ Dr. Keeler	2 Episodes
1998	The Sentinel	Phil Tanner	Episode "Neighbourhood Watch"
1998	The Colour Of Courage	Winchell	TV Movie
1998–1999	Millenium	CDC Examiner/Dr. Schroeder	2 Episodes
1999	The Net	Stan Bowman	Episode "Pay The Line"
1999	Viper	Morty Woods	Episode "My Fair Hoodlums"
1999	A Song From The Heart	Dr. Ambrosio	TV Movie
1999–2000	Nothing Too Good For A Cowboy	Bob Fraser	4 Episodes
2000	Seven Days	Dr. Barrison Hahn	Episode "X-35 Needs Changing"
2000	Scorn	Graham	TV Movie
2000	2gether: The Series	Ted	Episode "Dad"
2001	Cold Squad	Mr. Wilkins	Episode "Dead Soldiers"
2001	The Chris Isaak Show	Marty Weiss	Episode "The Real Me"
2001	Special Unit 2	Al Capone	Episode "The Eve"
2001–2002	Pasadena	Mr. Parkman	6 Episodes
2001–2007	Stargate SG-1	Dr. Bill Lee	20 Episodes
2002	Mysterious Ways	Eldon	Episode "Something Fishy"
2002	Damaged Care	Ralph Galston	TV Movie
2002	Beyond Belief: Fact Or Fiction	Reese Wyatt	Episode "The Wreath/Terror Night/Tants/The Candidate/The Ring"
2002	Door To Door	Chuck	TV Movie
2002	Carrie	Mr. Scharnhorst	TV Movie
2002	Just Cause		2 Episodes
2003	Tom Stone	Valmont	Episode "Pants On Fire"
2003	Betrayed	Lab Supervisor	TV Movie
2003	Peacemakers	James Gilmore	Episode "Legend Of The Gun"
2003	Air Crash Investigation	Mark Thomas	Episode "Unlocking Disaster"
2003–2005	Da Vinci's Inquest	Mayor Russ Hathaway	18 Episodes
2004	Behind the Camera: The Unauthorized Story of 'Charlie's Angels'	David Doyle	TV Movie
2004	NTSB: The Crash Of Flight 323	Wally	TV Movie
2004	The 4400	Terry Bennett	Episode "Becoming"
2004	The Days	Teacher	Episode "Day 1,385"
2004	Dead Like Me	Mickey	Episode "Ashes To Ashes"
2005	A Perfect Note	Rex	TV Movie
2005	Global Frequency	Oscar Cergeyev	TV Movie
2005–2008	Stargate: Atlantis	Dr. Bill Lee	7 Episodes
2006	Meltdown: Days Of Destruction	Olsen	TV Movie
2006	Absolute Zero	Dr. Veet	TV Movie
2006	A Job To Kill For	Terrence Leary	TV Movie
2006	Whistler	Lee Stolslian	Episode "Scratching The Surface"
2006	Masters Of Horror	Dr. Kiefer	Episode "Pro-Life"
2006–2007	Kyle XY	Professor Kern	5 Episodes
2007	Masters Of Science Fiction	McCoy	Episode "Jerry Was A Man"
2007	Exes & Ohs	Dr. Harrison	2 Episodes
2008	Robson Arms	Callahan	Episode "Prince Of Nigeria"
2009	Reaper	Funeral Director	Episode "The Home Stretch"
2009	Beyond Sherwood Forest	Friar Tuck	TV Movie
2009–2011	Stargate Universe	Dr. Bill Lee	2 Episodes
2011	The Killing	Editor-In-Chief	Episode "Beau Soleil"
2012	Once Upon A Time	Mayor Tomkins	Episode "Red-Handed"
2012–2019	Supernatural	Chip Harrington/Dr. Kadinsky	2 Episodes
2014	Arctic Air	Boomer Platt	Episode "Flying Solo"
2014	Continuum	Public Servant	Episode "Minute Man"
2014	Heavenly Match	Ed Newman	TV Movie
2014–2019	When Calls The Heart	Tom Trevoy	7 Episodes
2015	The Flash	Quentin Quale	Episode "The Nuclear Man"
2015	The Gourmet Detective	Peter	TV Movie
2015	Cedar Cove	Norman Elliot	Episode "Hello Again"
2015	Autumn Dreams	Hector	TV Movie
2016	Shut Eye	Dr. Pearlman	Episode "The Hanged Man"
2017	Framed For Murder: A Fixer Upper Mystery	Ned Davison	TV Movie
2018	The Man In The High Castle	Dr. Eric Zuckereyck	Episode "Kasumi (Through The Mists)"
2018	Marrying Father Christmas	Charles	TV Movie
2019	The Good Doctor	Committee Chair	Episode "Breakdown"
2019	iZombie	Sheldon Drake	Episode "Dot Zombieland"
2019	All Summer Long	Engineer Rob	TV Movie
2021	Trigger Me	Howard	4 Episodes

=== Video games ===
Year	Title	Role	Notes
2004	The X-Files: Resist or Serve	Chuck Burks	
