= Reframing (filmmaking) =

Change in camera angle without a cut

In film, reframing is a change in camera angle without a cut and can include changing the focus of the scene. The term has been more often used in film criticism than in actual cinema. Critics of the technique include André Bazin, among others.

In production or post-production, reframing allows filmmakers to change a sequence without having to reshoot. For example, zooming in on an actor to edit out nudity for a movie to also be broadcast over the air. Types of reframing include: pan, tilt, zoom, crane or boom shot, dolly or trucking shot, handheld shot, tracking shot, and steadicam shot.

== Notable films in which reframing is used ==
- A Bug's Life
- Citizen Kane
- The Player
- Pretty Baby
